= Duke of Manchester =

Title in the Peerage of Great Britain

Dukedom of Manchester
- Quarterly, 1st & 4th: Argent, 3 fusils conjoined in fess gules, a bordure sable (Montagu); 2nd & 3rd: Or an eagle displayed vert beaked and membered gules (Monthermer).
- Creation date: 13 April 1719
- Created by: King George I
- Peerage: Peerage of Great Britain
- First holder: Charles Montagu, 4th Earl of Manchester
- Present holder: Alexander Montagu, 13th Duke
- Heir presumptive: Lord Kimble William Drogo Montagu
- Subsidiary titles: Earl of Manchester; Viscount Mandeville; Baron Montagu of Kimbolton
- Former seats: Kimbolton Castle; Horton Hall; Tandragee Castle

Duke of Manchester is a title in the Peerage of Great Britain, and the current senior title of the House of Montagu. It was created in 1719 for the politician Charles Montagu, 4th Earl of Manchester. Manchester Parish in Jamaica was named after the 5th Duke, while its capital Mandeville was named after his son and heir. The current Duke is Alexander Montagu, 13th Duke of Manchester, a controversial British and Australian citizen who lives in the United States and has served several prison sentences. He succeeded to the peerage in 2002 following the death of his father Angus Montagu, 12th Duke of Manchester, the last of the dukes to hold a seat in the House of Lords.

== History ==
Their ancestor was Richard Ladde, grandfather of the Lord Chief Justice Sir Edward, who changed his name to Montagu around 1447. His descendants claimed a connection with the older house of Montagu or Montacute, Barons Montagu or Montacute and Earls of Salisbury, but there is no sound evidence that the two families were related. A case has been made out for the possibility that the Ladde alias came from a division among coheirs about 1420 of the remaining small inheritance of a line of Montagus at Spratton and Little Creton, also in Northamptonshire.

The judge Sir Edward Montagu's grandson, Edward Montagu, was raised to the peerage as 1st Baron Montagu of Boughton. He is the ancestor of the Dukes of Montagu. His brother, Sir Henry Montagu (c. 1563–1642), who served as Lord Chief Justice as well as Lord High Treasurer and Lord Privy Seal, was in 1620 raised to the Peerage of England as Viscount Mandeville, with the additional title Baron Montagu of Kimbolton, of Kimbolton in the County of Huntingdon. In 1626, he was made Earl of Manchester, of Manchester in the County of Lancaster. It is sometimes said, erroneously, that the title refers to Godmanchester in Huntingdonshire, and that the word "God" was deliberately excluded from the title on the basis that the grantee thought it would be blasphemous for him to be known as "Lord Godmanchester". However, the form of the creation makes it clear that the title refers to what is now the city of Manchester (at the time a town in Lancashire, formally known as the County of Lancaster).

His son, the 2nd Earl, was a prominent Parliamentary General during the Civil War, but later supported the restoration of Charles II. His son, the 3rd Earl, represented Huntingdonshire in the House of Commons. His son was the 4th Earl, who in 1719 was created Duke of Manchester.

Charles, 1st Duke of Manchester, was succeeded by his eldest son. The 2nd Duke notably served as Captain of the Yeomen of the Guard in the administration of Sir Robert Walpole. He was childless, and on his death, the titles passed to his younger brother, the 3rd Duke. He had earlier represented Huntingdonshire in Parliament. He was succeeded by his son, the 4th Duke. He was Ambassador to France and served as Lord Chamberlain of the Household. His son, the 5th Duke, was Governor of Jamaica between 1827 and 1830 also held office as Postmaster General. He was succeeded by his son, the 6th Duke. He represented Huntingdon in the House of Commons as a Tory.

His eldest son, the 7th Duke, was Conservative Member of Parliament for Bewdley and Huntingdonshire. His son, the 8th Duke, briefly represented Huntingdonshire in Parliament. He was succeeded by his eldest son, the 9th Duke. He sat on the Liberal benches in the House of Lords and served as Captain of the Yeomen of the Guard in the Liberal administration of Sir Henry Campbell-Bannerman. In the twentieth century, mismanagement and profligacy resulted in the wholesale depletion of the Dukedom's estates. Generational instability caused further damage to the family's honour: the 9th, 12th and 13th Dukes all had a criminal record.

Angus Montagu, 12th Duke of Manchester was the last of the dukes to serve in the House of Lords, until the adoption of the House of Lords Act 1999.

Alexander Montagu, the oldest son of the 12th Duke, succeeded his father as the 13th Duke in July 2002; a British and Australian citizen who lives in the United States, he had been known by the courtesy title of the heir apparent, Viscount Mandeville, since his father's succession to the peerage in 1985. He has not taken the required action to be included on the Roll of the Peerage, which was created two years after his succession in 2004; while this doesn't change his status as a duke itself, which is legally established by the letters patent, inclusion in the roll is since 2004 a requirement to have his title included in his passport. Under the provisions of the 2004 royal warrant he may register with the roll at any time.

== Estates and residences ==
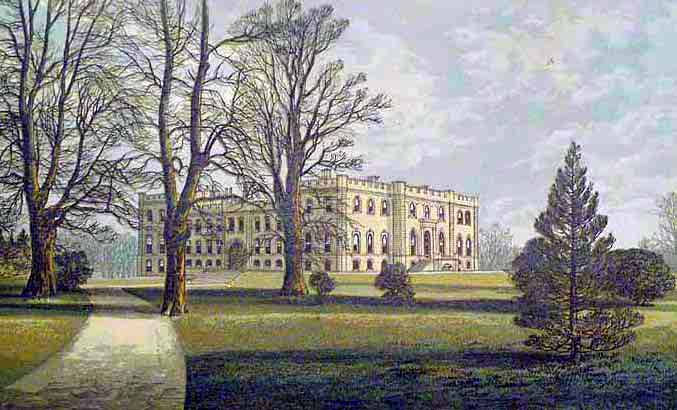
Kimbolton Castle in 1880, the former seat of the Dukes of Manchester

=== Family seat ===
The principal estate of the Dukes of Manchester was Kimbolton Castle. It was sold, together with 50 acres (20 ha) of parkland, by the 10th Duke in 1951, and is now a private school. A remaining 3,250 acres (1,320 ha) of the estate were sold by his eldest son and heir in 1975. The other family seat was Tandragee Castle, in County Armagh, Northern Ireland. It was sold in 1955, and the remaining estate in 1975, and is now the headquarters of Tayto (NI) Ltd.

=== Estates ===
In the 1883 edition of John Bateman's The Great Landowners of Great Britain and Ireland, William Montagu, 7th Duke of Manchester's estates were recorded as spanning 27,312 acres across England and Ireland, including 13,835 acres in Huntingdonshire, 1,124 acres in Cambridgeshire, 55 acres in Bedfordshire, and 12,298 acres in County Armagh, which produced a combined annual income of £40,360.

=== London residences ===
William Montagu, 2nd Duke of Manchester leased No. 26 Grosvenor Square from 1732 until his death in 1739. He was succeeded by his brother Robert Montagu, 3rd Duke of Manchester, who had maintained his London residence at No. 17 Cork Street, Mayfair, which he subsequently vacated upon his succession as Duke in 1739.

During the 1760s, the Duke of Manchester’s London house was located in Berkeley Square, although in 1767 George Montagu, 4th Duke of Manchester sold the house to Robert Child MP owing to his own shortage of funds. Manchester House in Manchester Square was built in 1776 for George Montagu, 4th Duke of Manchester, who maintained the property as his London residence until his death in 1788. By 1791, the house was being used as the Spanish Embassy, and was later acquired by Francis, 2nd Marquess of Hertford in 1797, after which the building was known as Hertford House. The house now serves as the location of the Wallace Collection museum.

William Montagu, 5th Duke of Manchester leased No. 96 Park Lane from 1828, which remained as his London residence until his death in 1843. He was succeeded by his son George Montagu, 6th Duke of Manchester, who in turn was succeeded by his own son William Montagu, 7th Duke of Manchester upon the former’s death in 1855.

In 1856, the 7th Duke purchased a new London house at No. 1 Great Stanhope Street, Mayfair, from the executors of George Cowper, 6th Earl Cowper, which remained as his London house until his death in 1890; he bequeathed his leasehold of the house to his widow Louisa, Dowager Duchess of Manchester. In 1892, the Dowager Duchess remarried Spencer Cavendish, 8th Duke of Devonshire, and by 1895 No. 1 Great Stanhope Street was being offered for sale by the executors of the 7th Duke of Manchester. Details of the sale advertisements noted that the property was held on an 850-year lease for a nominal ground rent, and therefore effectively on the same terms as a freehold.

The 7th Duke was briefly succeeded by his son George Montagu, 8th Duke of Manchester, who died in 1892. In 1876, the 8th Duke, then Viscount Mandeville, had married the wealthy American heiress Consuelo Yznaga; upon his death he was succeeded as Duke by their fifteen-year-old son William Montagu, 9th Duke of Manchester. Consuelo, Dowager Duchess of Manchester, maintained her family’s London residence at No. 45 Portman Square from c. 1895, until the house was partially damaged by a fire on 26 November 1904. In 1905, she purchased the lease of No. 5 Grosvenor Square, where she later died in 1909.

The 9th Duke inherited his mother’s leasehold interest in the house, which he maintained as his London residence until the outbreak of the First World War in 1914, after which the house was used as a military hospital. He later leased No. 38 Park Lane (later renumbered as No. 128) in 1917.

== Burial place ==
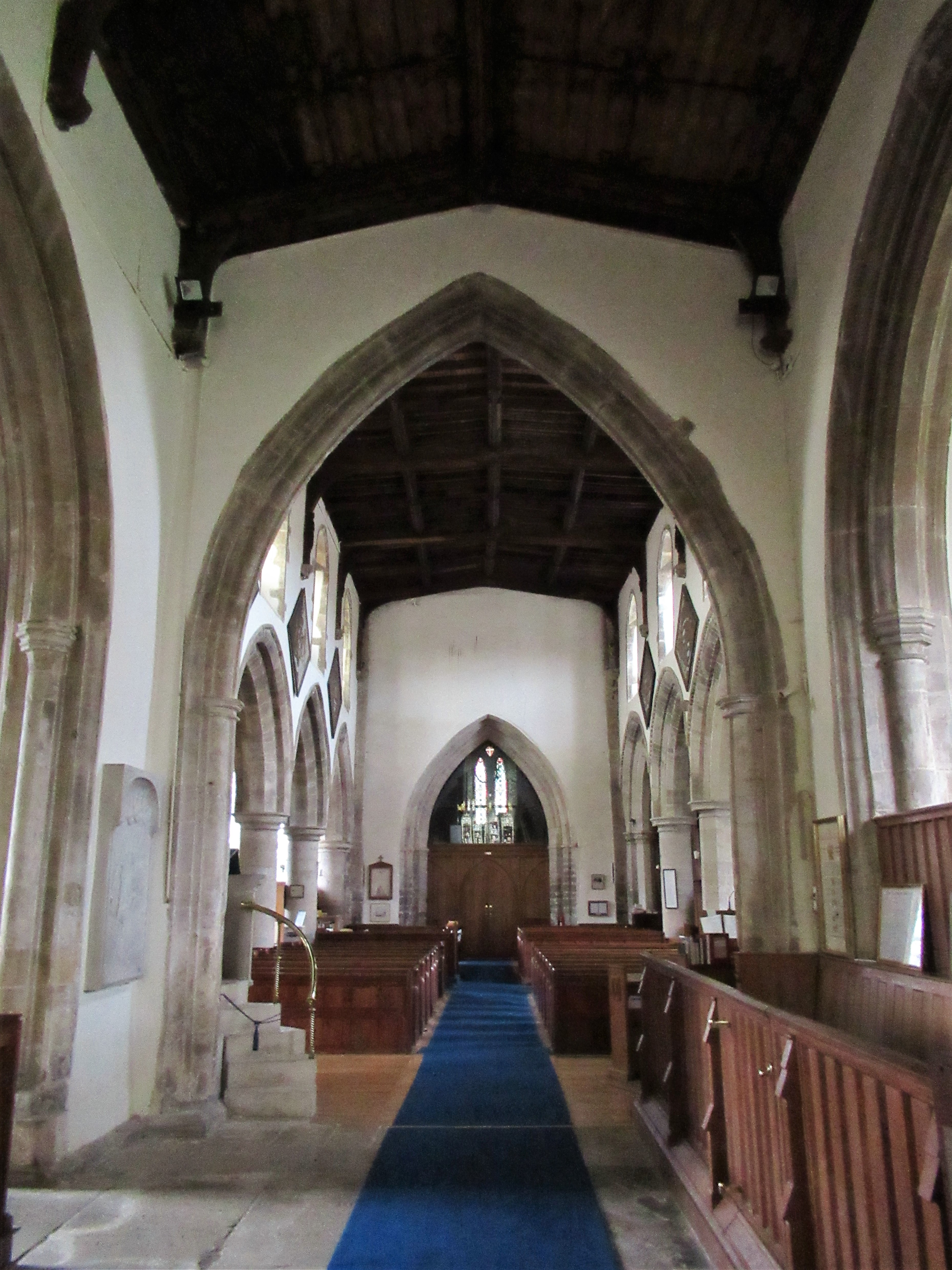
Interior (nave) of St Andrew's Church, Kimbolton, principal burial place of the Montagu family

Many members of the Montagu family (Earls and Dukes of Manchester and their family members) are buried at St Andrew's Church, Kimbolton, Cambridgeshire (historically in Huntingdonshire). Several Montagu monuments still exist in the South Chapel, while the Montagu Vault (extended in 1853) is located beneath the North Chapel. The Montagu Vault is accessed from the churchyard via a doorway surmounted by heraldic beasts, which was added to the building in 1893. The 12th Duke of Manchester, who died in 2002, was cremated at Bedford Crematorium after which his ashes were placed in the Montagu Vault.

== Arms ==
Coat of arms of the Duke of Manchester
| Coronet A Coronet of a Duke Crest A Griffin's Head couped wings expanded Or Helm The helm of a Peer Escutcheon Quarterly, 1st & 4th: Argent, 3 fusils conjoined in fess gules (Montagu); 2nd & 3rd: Or an eagle displayed vert beaked and membered gules (Monthermer) Supporters Dexter: an heraldic Antelope Or armed tufted and hoofed Argent; Sinister: a Griffin Or Motto Disponendo Me, Non Mutando Me (By disposing of me, not by changing me) Symbolism The fusils (diamonds) in the Montagu arms were originally intended to represent a range of mountains, as the name comes from the old French mont agu meaning "pointed hill". The arms represent a claim to be a cadet of the medieval Montagu (Montacute) family, Earls of Salisbury, for which there is no proof. |

The arms of the Duke of Manchester have the following blazon: Quarterly, 1st & 4th: Argent, 3 fusils conjoined in fess gules (Montagu); 2nd & 3rd: Or an eagle displayed vert beaked and membered gules (Monthermer). The fusils or diamond shapes in the Montagu arms were originally intended to represent a range of mountains, as the name comes from the old French mont agu meaning "pointed hill". The arms represent a claim to be a cadet of the medieval Montagu (Montacute) family, earls of Salisbury, for which there is no proof (see above origins).

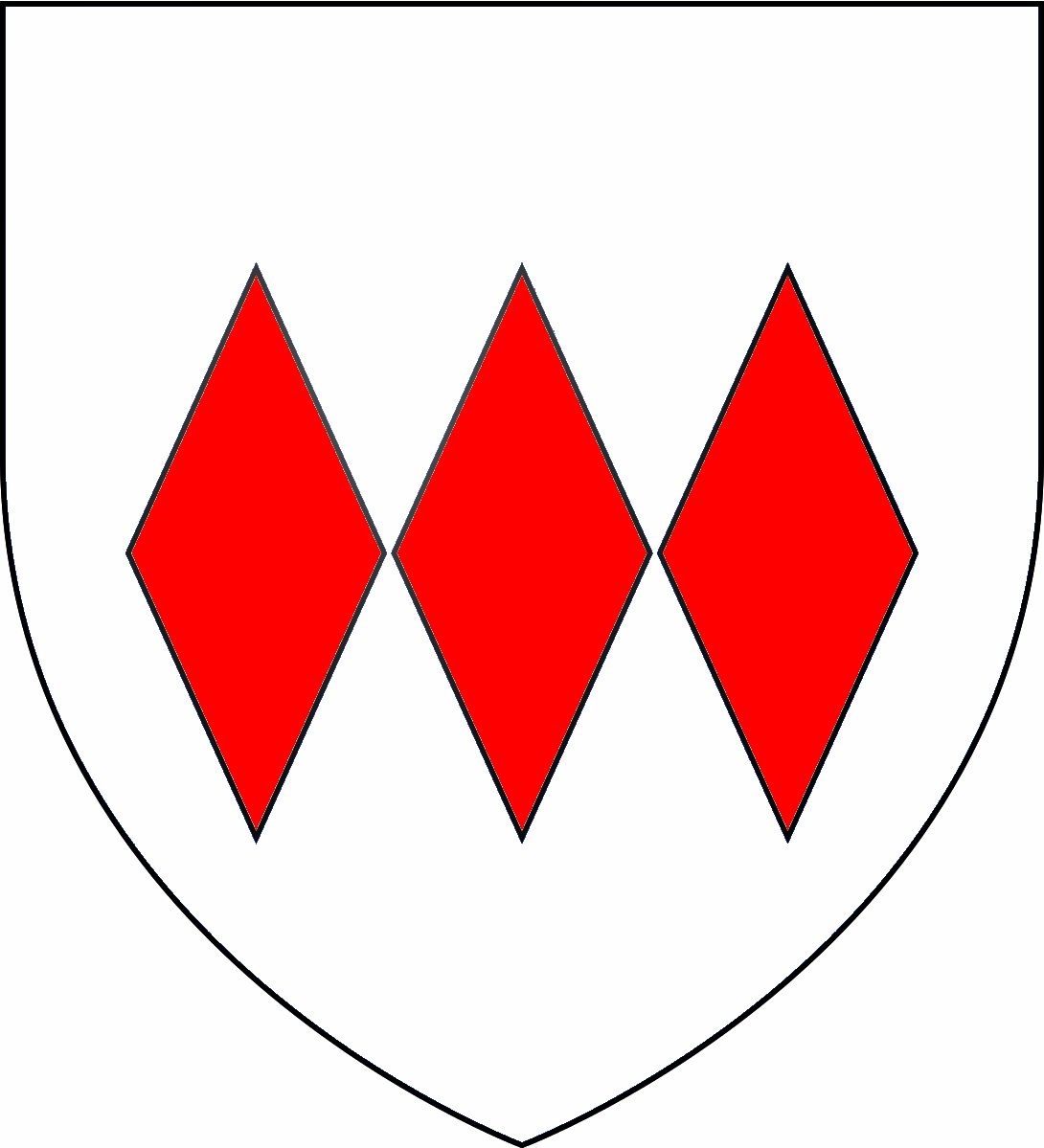
Montagu arms unquartered of Barons Montagu/Montacute

Monthermar arms, "Or, an eagle displayed vert beaked and membered gules."

Arms of Montague/Montacute, Earls of Salisbury

Arms of Montagu, dukes of Manchester, dukes of Montagu, and earls of Sandwich and Halifax, claiming to be cadets of the medieval Montagus.

Arms of the Montagu family

== Titles ==
The Duke of Manchester holds the subsidiary titles Earl of Manchester, Viscount Mandeville, and Baron Montagu of Kimbolton.

The heir apparent to the Dukedom takes the courtesy title Viscount Mandeville, and the heir apparent's eldest son is styled Lord Kimbolton.

== Viscount Mandeville (1620) ==
| # | Name | Life span | Period | Spouse | Other titles |
|---|---|---|---|---|---|
| 1 | Henry Montagu | 1563–1642 | 1620–1642 | (1) Catherine Spencer | Baron Montagu of Kimbolton |
| 1 | Henry Montagu | 1563–1642 | 1620–1642 | (2) Anne Halliday, née Wincot | Baron Montagu of Kimbolton |
| 1 | Henry Montagu | 1563–1642 | 1620–1642 | (3) Margaret Crouch | Baron Montagu of Kimbolton |

== Earls of Manchester (1626) ==
| # | Name | Life span | Period | Spouse | Notes | Other titles |
|---|---|---|---|---|---|---|
| 1 | Henry Montagu | 1563–1642 | 1626–1642 | (1) Catherine Spencer | --- | Viscount Mandeville; Baron Montagu of Kimbolton |
| 1 | Henry Montagu | 1563–1642 | 1626–1642 | (2) Anne Halliday, née Wincot | --- | Viscount Mandeville; Baron Montagu of Kimbolton |
| 1 | Henry Montagu | 1563–1642 | 1626–1642 | (3) Margaret Crouch | --- | Viscount Mandeville; Baron Montagu of Kimbolton |
| 2 | Edward Montagu | 1602–1671 | 1642–1671 | (1) Susannah Hill | Son of the preceding | Viscount Mandeville; Baron Montagu of Kimbolton |
| 2 | Edward Montagu | 1602–1671 | 1642–1671 | (2) Lady Anne Rich | Son of the preceding | Viscount Mandeville; Baron Montagu of Kimbolton |
| 2 | Edward Montagu | 1602–1671 | 1642–1671 | (3) Essex, Lady Bevill | Son of the preceding | Viscount Mandeville; Baron Montagu of Kimbolton |
| 2 | Edward Montagu | 1602–1671 | 1642–1671 | (4) Eleanor, Dowager Countess of Warwick | Son of the preceding | Viscount Mandeville; Baron Montagu of Kimbolton |
| 2 | Edward Montagu | 1602–1671 | 1642–1671 | (5) Margaret, Dowager Countess of Carlisle | Son of the preceding | Viscount Mandeville; Baron Montagu of Kimbolton |
| 3 | Robert Montagu | 1634–1683 | 1671–1683 | Anne Yelverton | Son of the preceding | Viscount Mandeville; Baron Montagu of Kimbolton |
| 4 | Charles Montagu | 1662–1722 | 1683–1722 | Dodington Greville | Son of the preceding | Viscount Mandeville; Baron Montagu of Kimbolton |

== Dukes of Manchester (1719) ==
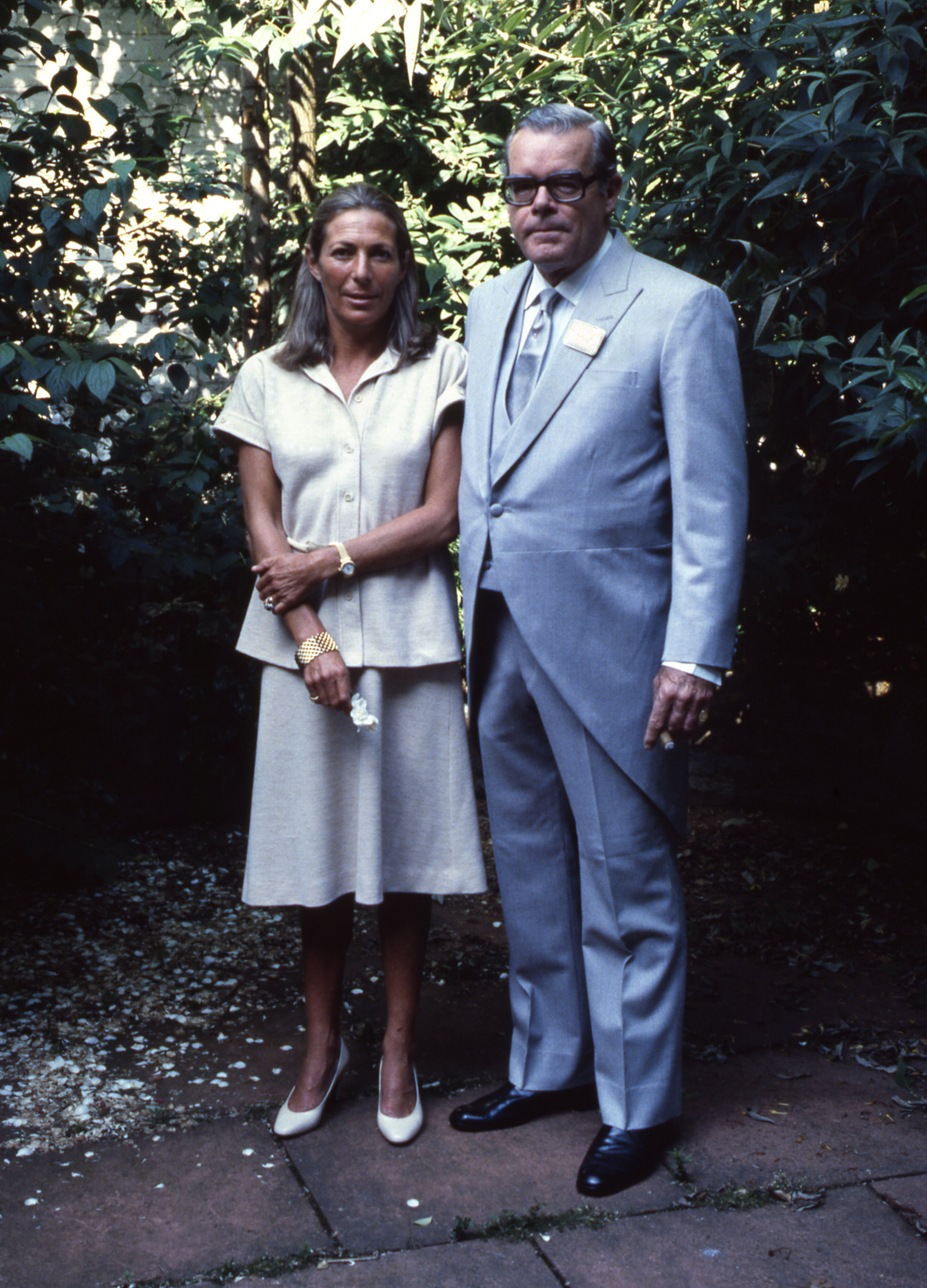
Sidney, 11th Duke of Manchester, and his wife, Andrea, Duchess of Manchester, by Allan Warren

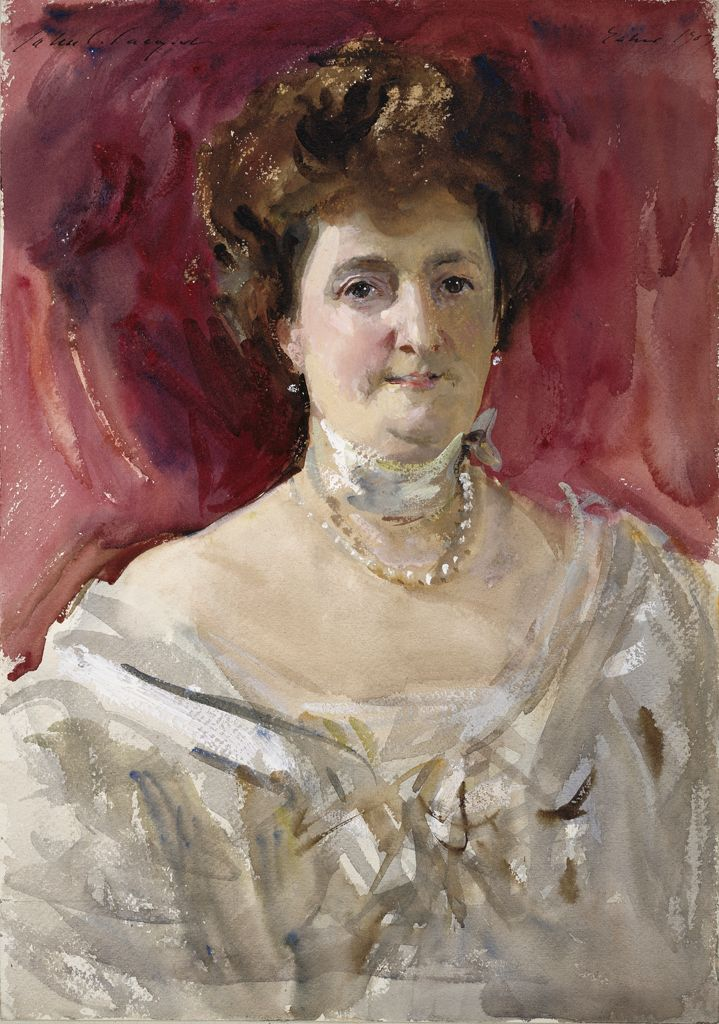
Consuelo Montagu, Duchess of Manchester, wife of the 8th Duke. By John Singer Sargent.

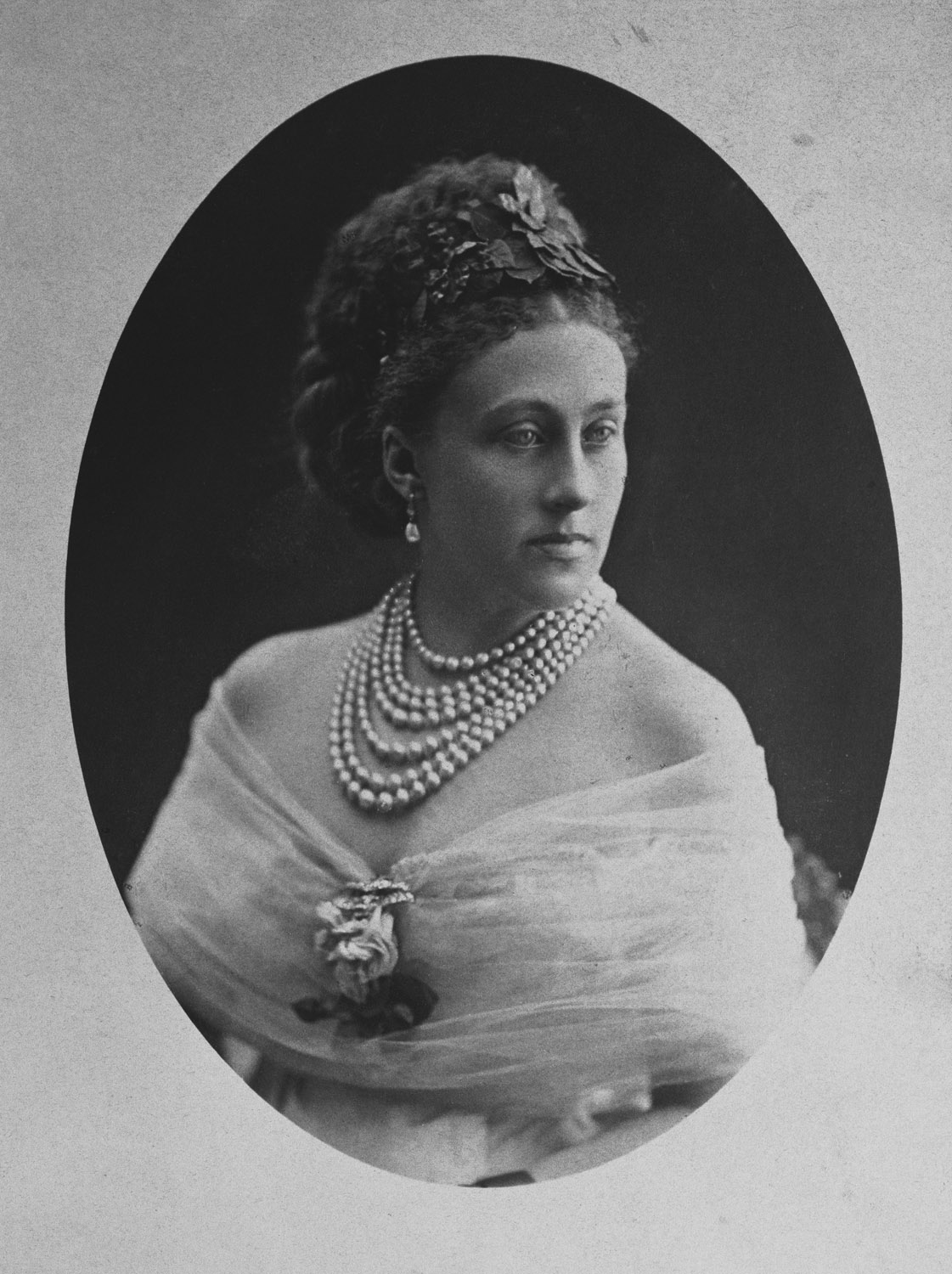
Louise Montagu, wife of the 7th Duke

Created by George I of Great Britain
| # | Name | Life span | Period | Spouse | Notes | Other titles |
|---|---|---|---|---|---|---|
| 1 | Charles Montagu | c. 1662 – 1722 | 1719–1722 | Dodington Greville | | Earl of Manchester, Viscount Mandeville, Baron Montagu of Kimbolton |
| 2 | William Montagu | 1700–1739 | 1722–1739 | Lady Isabella Montagu | Son of the preceding | Earl of Manchester, Viscount Mandeville, Baron Montagu of Kimbolton |
| 3 | Robert Montagu | 1710–1762 | 1739–1762 | Harriet Dunch | Brother of the preceding | Earl of Manchester, Viscount Mandeville, Baron Montagu of Kimbolton |
| 4 | George Montagu | 1737–1788 | 1762–1788 | Elizabeth Dashwood | Son of the preceding | Earl of Manchester, Viscount Mandeville, Baron Montagu of Kimbolton |
| 5 | William Montagu | 1771–1843 | 1788–1843 | Lady Susan Gordon | Son of the preceding | Earl of Manchester, Viscount Mandeville, Baron Montagu of Kimbolton |
| 6 | George Montagu | 1799–1855 | 1843–1855 | (1) Millicent Sparrow (2) Harriet Sydney Dobbs | Son of the preceding | Earl of Manchester, Viscount Mandeville, Baron Montagu of Kimbolton |
| 7 | William Montagu | 1823–1890 | 1855–1890 | Countess Louisa of Alten | Son of the preceding | Earl of Manchester, Viscount Mandeville, Baron Montagu of Kimbolton |
| 8 | George Montagu | 1853–1892 | 1890–1892 | Consuelo Yznaga | Son of the preceding | Earl of Manchester, Viscount Mandeville, Baron Montagu of Kimbolton |
| 9 | William Montagu | 1877–1947 | 1892–1947 | (1) Helena Zimmerman (2) Kathleen Dawes | Son of the preceding | Earl of Manchester, Viscount Mandeville, Baron Montagu of Kimbolton |
| 10 | Alexander Montagu | 1902–1977 | 1947–1977 | (1) Nell Vere Stead (2) Elizabeth Fullerton | Son of the preceding | Earl of Manchester, Viscount Mandeville, Baron Montagu of Kimbolton |
| 11 | Sidney Montagu | 1929–1985 | 1977–1985 | (1) Adrienne Valerie Christie (2) Andrea Joss | Son of the preceding | Earl of Manchester, Viscount Mandeville, Baron Montagu of Kimbolton |
| 12 | Angus Montagu | 1938–2002 | 1985–2002 | (1) Mary Eveleen McClure (2) Diane Pauline Plimsaul (3) Anne-Louise Taylor (4) Biba Jennians | Brother of the preceding | Earl of Manchester, Viscount Mandeville, Baron Montagu of Kimbolton |
| 13 | Alexander Montagu (Note: The 13th Duke of Manchester succeeded to the peerage in 2002, but as of July 2022 does not appear on the Roll of the Peerage. To be legally recognised as a Peer in official documents, he must prove his succession and be placed on the Roll.) | b. 1962 | 2002–present | (1) Marion Stoner (2) Wendy Dawn Buford (3) Laura Smith | Son of the preceding Incumbent | Earl of Manchester, Viscount Mandeville, Baron Montagu of Kimbolton |

The heir presumptive to the dukedom is the present Duke's younger brother, Lord Kimble William Drogo Montagu (born 1964), whose heir is his only son William Anthony Drogo Montagu (born 2000).

== Family tree and succession ==
Montagu family tree— Manchester: Earls and Dukes, Montagu: and Earls and Dukes, and Monthermer: Viscounts and Marquesses

Edward Montagu c. 1485–1557
Edward Montagu c. 1530–1602
Baron Montagu of Boughton, 1621 | Viscount Mandeville and Baron Montagu of Kimbolton, of Kimbolton in the County of Huntingdon, 1620; Earl of Manchester, 1626
Edward Montagu c. 1562–1644; 1st Baron Montagu of Boughton | Henry Montagu c. 1563–1642; 1st Earl of Manchester, etc. | Sidney Montagu c. 1572–1644
Earl of Sandwich, Viscount Hinchingbrooke, Baron Montagu of St Neots, of St Neots in the County of Huntingdon, 1660
Edward Montagu; 1616–1684; 2nd Baron Montagu of Boughton | Edward Montagu; 1602–1671; 2nd Earl of Manchester, etc. | George Montagu; 1622–1681 | Edward Montagu; 1625–1672; 1st Earl of Sandwich, etc.
Earl of Montagu and Viscount Monthermer, 1689; Duke of Montagu and Marquess of Monthermer (1st creation), 1705 | Baron Halifax, 1700; Earl of Halifax (2nd creation) and Viscount Sunbury (2nd creation), 1714
Edward Montagu c. 1636–1665 | Ralph Montagu; 1638–1709; 1st Duke of Montagu, etc., 3rd Baron Montagu of Boughton | Robert Montagu; 1634–1683; 3rd Earl of Manchester, etc. | Edward Montagu; 1649–1690 | Charles Montagu; 1661–1715; 1st Earl of Halifax etc., 1st Baron Halifax | Edward Montagu; 1647/48–1688; 2nd Earl of Sandwich, etc.
Earldom of Halifax (2nd creation) and Viscount Sunbury extinct, 1715
Duke of Manchester, 1719 | Earl of Halifax (3rd creation) and Viscount Sunbury (3rd creation), 1714
John Montagu; 1690–1749; 2nd Duke of Montagu, etc., 4th Baron Montagu of Boughton | Charles Edward Montagu c. 1662–1722; 1st Duke of Manchester, 4th Earl of Manchester, etc. | George Montagu; 1685–1739; 1st Earl of Halifax, etc., 2nd Baron Halifax | Edward Montagu; 1670–1729; 3rd Earl of Sandwich, etc.
Dukedom of Montagu (1st creation) and subsidiary titles extinct, 1749
Duke of Montagu (2nd creation) and Marquess of Monthermer (2nd creation), 1766; Baron Montagu of Boughton (3rd creation), 1776
George Brudenell; 1712–1790; Duke of Montagu, etc., Earl of Cardigan; 1st Baron Montagu of Boughton | Mary Montagu c. 1711–1775 | Isabella Montagu d. 1786 | William Montagu; 1700–1739; 2nd Duke of Manchester, 5th Earl of Manchester, etc. | Robert Montagu c. 1710–1762; 3rd Duke of Manchester, 6th Earl of Manchester, etc. | George Montagu-Dunk; 1716–1771; 2nd Earl of Halifax, etc., 3rd Baron Halifax | Edward Montagu; 1692–1722 styled Viscount Hinchingbrooke | John Montagu; 1718–1792; 4th Earl of Sandwich, etc.
Dukedom of Montagu (2nd creation) and subsidiary titles extinct, 1790 | Earldom of Halifax (3rd creation) and subsidiary titles extinct, 1771
Baron Montagu of Boughton (2nd creation), 1762
John Montagu; 1735–1770; Baron Montagu of Boughton, styled Marquess of Monthermer | Elizabeth Montagu; 1743–1827 | George Montagu; 1737–1788; 4th Duke of Manchester, 7th Earl of Manchester, etc. | Elizabeth Montague-Dunk d. 1768 | John Montagu; 1744–1814; 5th Earl of Sandwich, etc.
Baron Montagu of Boughton (2nd creation) extinct, 1770
Henry Montagu-Scott; 1776–1845; 2nd Baron Montagu of Boughton | George Montagu; 1763–1772 styled Viscount Mandeville | William Montagu; 1771–1843; 5th Duke of Manchester, 8th Earl of Manchester, etc. | John George Montagu; 1767–1790 styled Viscount Hinchinbroke | George John Montagu; 1773–1818; 6th Earl of Sandwich, etc.
Baron Montagu of Boughton (3rd creation) extinct, 1845
George Montagu; 1799–1855; 6th Duke of Manchester, 9th Earl of Manchester, etc.
William Drogo Montagu; 1823–1890; 7th Duke of Manchester, 10th Earl of Manchester, etc. | Robert Montagu; 1825–1902 | John William Montagu; 1811–1884; 7th Earl of Sandwich, etc.
George Victor Drogo Montagu; 1853–1892; 8th Duke of Manchester, 11th Earl of Manchester, etc. | Robert Acheson Cromie Montagu; 1854–1931 | Edward George Henry Montagu; 1839–1916; 8th Earl of Sandwich, etc. | Victor Alexander Montagu; 1841–1915
William Angus Drogo Montagu; 1877–1947; 9th Duke of Manchester, 12th Earl of Manchester, etc. | John Michael Cromie Montagu; 1881–1966 | George Charles Montagu; 1874–1962; 9th Earl of Sandwich, etc.
Alexander George Francis Drogo Montagu; 1902–1977; 10th Duke of Manchester, 13th Earl of Manchester, etc. | Robert Alexander Montagu; 1917–1996 | Alexander Victor Edward Paulet Montagu; 1906–1995; 10th Earl of Sandwich, etc.
Sidney Arthur Robin George Drogo Montagu; 1929–1985; 11th Duke of Manchester, 14th Earl of Manchester, etc. | Angus Charles Drogo Montagu; 1938–2002; 12th Duke of Manchester, 15th Earl of Manchester, etc. | John Edward Hollister Montagu; 1943–2025; 11th Earl of Sandwich, etc.
Alexander Charles David Drogo Montagu b. 1962; 13th Duke of Manchester, 16th Earl of Manchester, etc. | Kimble William Drogo Montagu b. 1964 | Emma Louise Eveleen Montagu Hodgkinson; 1965–2014 | Michael Anthony Montagu b. 1955 | Luke Timothy Charles Montagu b. 1969; 12th Earl of Sandwich, etc.
Heir presumptive to the dukedom of Manchester
William James Hayman Montagu b. 2004 styled Viscount Hinchingbrooke
Heir apparent to the earldom of Sandwich

Line of succession (simplified)
- George Montagu, 6th Duke of Manchester (1799–1855)
  - William Montagu, 7th Duke of Manchester (1823–1890)
    - George Montagu, 8th Duke of Manchester (1853–1892)
      - William Montagu, 9th Duke of Manchester (1877–1947)
        - Alexander Montagu, 10th Duke of Manchester (1902–1977)
          - Sidney Montagu, 11th Duke of Manchester (1929–1985)
          - Angus Montagu, 12th Duke of Manchester (1938–2002)
            - Alexander Montagu, 13th Duke of Manchester (born 1962)
            - (1). Lord Kimble William Drogo Montagu (born 1964)
              - (2). William Anthony Drogo Montagu (born 2000)
  - Lord Robert Montagu (1825–1902)
    - Robert Acheson Cromie Montagu (1854–1931)
      - John Michael Cromie Montagu (1881–1966)
        - Robert Alexander Montagu (1917–1992)
          - (3). Michael Anthony Montagu (born 1955)
      - Austin Cromie Montagu (1885–1958)
        - Cyril John Sanderson Montagu (1937–2020)
          - (4). Graeme Peter Montagu (born 1967)
          - (5). Christopher John Montagu (born 1968)
        - (6). Gerard Philip Sanderson Montagu (born 1940)
          - (7). Matthew Gerard Montagu (born 1976)
    - Henry Bernard Montagu (1872–1941)
      - John Drogo Montagu (1923–2010)
        - male issue and descendants in remainder

There are further male heirs in remainder to the Earldom of Manchester descended from the younger sons of the first Earl.
