= Baron Montagu of Boughton =

Barony in the Peerage of Great Britain

Baron Montagu of Boughton is a British title which has been created twice for members of the Noble House of Montagu. First created in 1621, in the Peerage of England, for Sir Edward Montagu, eldest son of Sir Edward Montagu of Boughton and grandson of another Sir Edward Montagu who had been Lord Chief Justice during the reign of Henry VIII. He was also the brother of Henry Montagu, later created Earl of Manchester, and of Sidney Montagu, ancestor of the Earls of Sandwich.

Their ancestor was one Richard Ladde, grandfather of the Lord Chief Justice Sir Edward, who changed his name to Montagu in about 1447. His descendants claimed a connection with the main house of Montagu or Montacute, Barons Montagu and Earls of Salisbury, but the exact descent is unclear. A case has been made out for the possibility that the Ladde alias came from a division among coheirs about 1420 of the remaining small inheritance of a line of Montagus at Spratton and Little Creton, also in Northamptonshire.

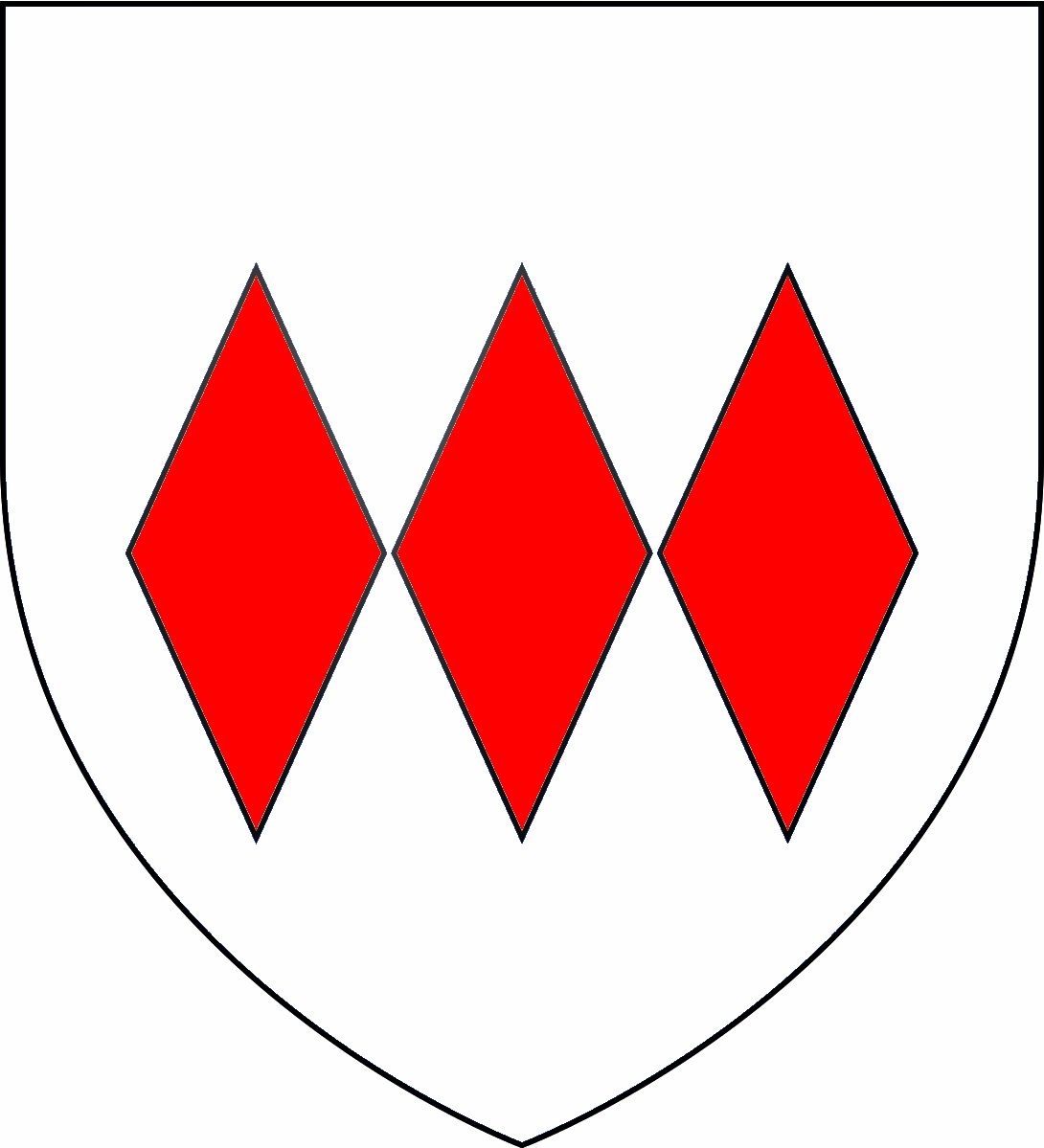
Montagu Arms Unquartered of Barons Montagu/Montacute

Monthermar arms, "Or, an eagle displayed vert beaked and membered gules."

Arms of Montague/Montacute, Earls of Salisbury

Arms of Montagu, dukes of Manchester, dukes of Montagu, and earls of Sandwich and Halifax, claiming to be cadets of the medieval Montagus.

Arms of Montagu Family

The third Baron Montagu of Boughton was created Earl of Montagu and Viscount Monthermer in 1689 and Duke of Montagu and Marquess of Monthermer in 1705. He had married in 1675 the Lady Elizabeth Wriothesley, daughter of the 4th Earl of Southampton and a descendant of the original houses of Montagu and Monthermer. The Dukedom, Earldom and Barony of Montagu all became extinct on the death of their son John, 2nd Duke of Montagu, in 1749. The next creation was in 1762, in the Peerage of Great Britain. John Montagu, styled Lord Brudenell, son of the 4th Earl of Cardigan and maternal grandson of the last Duke of Montagu, was created Baron Montagu of Boughton in 1762. This title became extinct on his death without issue in 1770.

The next creation was for the late Baron's father, who had been created Duke of Montagu in 1766. He was created Baron Montagu of Boughton, again in the Peerage of Great Britain, in 1786. On his death in 1790, when the Dukedom became extinct, the Barony passed under a special remainder to his female-line grandson Lord Henry Scott, second son of the 3rd Duke of Buccleuch. Lord Henry Scott also inherited the Lordship of Bowland from his mother, the Duchess, having the title entailed upon him by his nephew, the 5th Duke, in 1827. He died in 1845 whereupon the title of Montagu of Boughton became extinct.

His great-nephew Lord Henry Douglas-Scott-Montagu, second son of the 5th Duke of Buccleuch, was created Baron Montagu of Beaulieu in 1885.

== Barons Montagu of Boughton, first creation (1621) ==
- Edward Montagu, 1st Baron Montagu of Boughton (1560–1644)
- Edward Montagu, 2nd Baron Montagu of Boughton (1616–1684)
- Ralph Montagu, 3rd Baron Montagu of Boughton (1638–1709), created Earl and then Duke of Montagu
- John Montagu, 4th Baron Montagu of Boughton, 2nd Duke of Montagu (1690–1749)

Montagu family tree— Manchester: Earls and Dukes, Montagu: and Earls and Dukes, and Monthermer: Viscounts and Marquesses

Edward Montagu c. 1485–1557
Edward Montagu c. 1530–1602
Baron Montagu of Boughton, 1621	Viscount Mandeville and Baron Montagu of Kimbolton, of Kimbolton in the County of Huntingdon, 1620; Earl of Manchester, 1626
Edward Montagu c. 1562–1644; 1st Baron Montagu of Boughton	Henry Montagu c. 1563–1642; 1st Earl of Manchester, Viscount Mandeville, and Baron Montagu of Kimbolton	Sidney Montagu c. 1572–1644
Earl of Sandwich, Viscount Hinchingbrooke, Baron Montagu of St Neots, of St Neots in the County of Huntingdon, 1660
Edward Montagu; 1616–1684; 2nd Baron Montagu of Boughton	Edward Montagu; 1602–1671; 2nd Earl of Manchester, Viscount Mandeville, and Baron Montagu of Kimbolton	George Montagu; 1622–1681	Edward Montagu; 1625–1672; 1st Earl of Sandwich, Viscount Hinchingbrooke, and Baron Montagu of St Neots
Earl of Montagu and Viscount Monthermer, 1689; Duke of Montagu and Marquess of Monthermer (1st creation), 1705	Baron Halifax, 1700; Earl of Halifax (2nd creation) and Viscount Sunbury (2nd creation), 1714
Edward Montagu c. 1636–1665	Ralph Montagu; 1638–1709; 1st Duke of Montagu, Earl of Montagu, and Viscount Monthermer, 3rd Baron Montagu of Boughton	Robert Montagu; 1634–1683; 3rd Earl of Manchester, Viscount Mandeville, and Baron Montagu of Kimbolton	Edward Montagu; 1649–1690	Charles Montagu; 1661–1715; 1st Earl of Halifax and Viscount Sunbury, 1st Baron Halifax	Edward Montagu; 1647/48–1688; 2nd Earl of Sandwich, Viscount Hinchingbrooke, and Baron Montagu of St Neots
Earldom of Halifax (2nd creation) and subsidiary titles extinct, 1715
Duke of Manchester, 1719	Earl of Halifax (3rd creation) and subsidiary titles (3rd creation), 1714
John Montagu; 1690–1749; 2nd Duke of Montagu, Earl of Montagu, and Viscount Monthermer, 4th Baron Montagu of Boughton	Charles Edward Montagu c. 1662–1722; 1st Duke of Manchester, 4th Earl of Manchester, Viscount Mandeville, and Baron Montagu of Kimbolton	George Montagu; 1685–1739; 1st Earl of Halifax and Viscount Sunbury, 2nd Baron Halifax	Edward Montagu; 1670–1729; 3rd Earl of Sandwich, Viscount Hinchingbrooke, and Baron Montagu of St Neots
Dukedom of Montagu (1st creation) and subsidiary titles extinct, 1749
Duke of Montagu (2nd creation) and Marquess of Monthermer (2nd creation), 1766; Baron Montagu of Boughton (3rd creation), 1776
George Brudenell; 1712–1790; Earl of Cardigan; Duke of Montagu, Marquess of Monthermer, 1st Baron Montagu of Boughton	Mary Montagu c. 1711–1775	Lady Isabella Montagu d. 1786	William Montagu; 1700–1739; 2nd Duke of Manchester, 5th Earl of Manchester, Viscount Mandeville, and Baron Montagu of Kimbolton	Robert Montagu c. 1710–1762; 3rd Duke of Manchester, 6th Earl of Manchester, Viscount Mandeville, and Baron Montagu of Kimbolton	George Montagu-Dunk; 1716–1771; 2nd Earl of Halifax and Viscount Sunbury, 3rd Baron Halifax	Edward Montagu; 1692–1722 styled Viscount Hinchingbrooke	John Montagu; 1718–1792; 4th Earl of Sandwich, Viscount Hinchingbrooke, and Baron Montagu of St Neots 🥪
Dukedom of Montagu (2nd creation) and subsidiary titles extinct, 1790	Earldom of Halifax (3rd creation) and subsidiary titles extinct, 1771
Baron Montagu of Boughton (2nd creation), 1762
John Montagu; 1735–1770; Baron Montagu of Boughton, styled Marquess of Monthermer	Elizabeth Scott; 1743–1827	George Montagu; 1737–1788; 4th Duke of Manchester, 7th Earl of Manchester, Viscount Mandeville, and Baron Montagu of Kimbolton	Lady Elizabeth Montague-Dunk d. 1768	John Montagu; 1744–1814; 5th Earl of Sandwich, Viscount Hinchingbrooke, and Baron Montagu of St Neots
Baron Montagu of Boughton (2nd creation) extinct, 1770
Henry Montagu-Scott; 1776–1845; 2nd Baron Montagu of Boughton	George Montagu; 1763–1772 styled Viscount Mandeville	William Montagu; 1771–1843; 5th Duke of Manchester, 8th Earl of Manchester, Viscount Mandeville, and Baron Montagu of Kimbolton	John George Montagu; 1767–1790 styled Viscount Hinchinbroke	George John Montagu; 1773–1818; 6th Earl of Sandwich, Viscount Hinchingbrooke, and Baron Montagu of St Neots
Baron Montagu of Boughton (3rd creation) extinct, 1845
George Montagu; 1799–1855; 6th Duke of Manchester, 9th Earl of Manchester, Viscount Mandeville, and Baron Montagu of Kimbolton
William Drogo Montagu; 1823–1890; 7th Duke of Manchester, 10th Earl of Manchester, Viscount Mandeville, and Baron Montagu of Kimbolton	Lord Robert Montagu; 1825–1902	John William Montagu; 1811–1884; 7th Earl of Sandwich, Viscount Hinchingbrooke, and Baron Montagu of St Neots
George Victor Drogo Montagu; 1853–1892; 8th Duke of Manchester, 11th Earl of Manchester, Viscount Mandeville, and Baron Montagu of Kimbolton	Robert Acheson Cromie Montagu; 1854–1931	Edward George Henry Montagu; 1839–1916; 8th Earl of Sandwich, Viscount Hinchingbrooke, and Baron Montagu of St Neots	Victor Alexander Montagu; 1841–1915
William Angus Drogo Montagu; 1877–1947; 9th Duke of Manchester, 12th Earl of Manchester, Viscount Mandeville, and Baron Montagu of Kimbolton	John Michael Cromie Montagu; 1881–1966	George Charles Montagu; 1874–1962; 9th Earl of Sandwich, Viscount Hinchingbrooke, and Baron Montagu of St Neots
Alexander George Francis Drogo Montagu; 1902–1977; 10th Duke of Manchester, 13th Earl of Manchester, Viscount Mandeville, and Baron Montagu of Kimbolton	Robert Alexander Montagu; 1917–1996	Alexander Victor Edward Paulet Montagu; 1906–1995; 10th Earl of Sandwich, Viscount Hinchingbrooke, and Baron Montagu of St Neots
Sidney Arthur Robin George Drogo Montagu; 1929–1985; 11th Duke of Manchester, 14th Earl of Manchester, Viscount Mandeville, and Baron Montagu of Kimbolton	Angus Charles Drogo Montagu; 1938–2002; 12th Duke of Manchester, 15th Earl of Manchester, Viscount Mandeville, and Baron Montagu of Kimbolton	John Edward Hollister Montagu; 1943–2025; 11th Earl of Sandwich, Viscount Hinchingbrooke, and Baron Montagu of St Neots
Alexander Charles David Drogo Montagu b. 1962; 13th Duke of Manchester, 16th Earl of Manchester, Viscount Mandeville, and Baron Montagu of Kimbolton	Lord Kimble William Drogo Montagu b. 1964	Lady Emma Louise Eveleen Montagu Hodgkinson; 1965–2014	Michael Anthony Montagu b. 1955	Luke Timothy Charles Montagu b. 1969; 12th Earl of Sandwich, Viscount Hinchingbrooke, and Baron Montagu of St Neots
Heir presumptive to the dukedom of Manchester
William James Hayman Montagu b. 2004 styled Viscount Hinchingbrooke
Heir apparent to the earldom of Sandwich

== Barons Montagu of Boughton, second creation (1762) ==
- John Montagu, Marquess of Monthermer (1735–1770)

== Barons Montagu of Boughton, third creation (1786) ==
- George Montagu, 1st Duke of Montagu, 1st Baron Montagu of Boughton (1712–1790)
- Henry James Montagu-Scott, 2nd Baron Montagu of Boughton (1776–1845)

== See also ==
- Baron Montagu
- Baron Montagu of Beaulieu
