= Duke of Montagu =

Dukedom in the Peerage of Great Britain

Dukedom of Montagu
- Creation date: 5 November 1766
- Creation: Second
- Created by: King George III
- Peerage: Peerage of Great Britain
- First holder: George Montagu (né Brudenell), 4th Earl of Cardigan
- Subsidiary titles: Marquess of Monthermer, Earl of Cardigan, Baron Brudenell of Stonton, Baron Montagu of Boughton
- Status: Extinct
- Extinction date: 23 May 1790
- Motto: Aequitas Actionum Regula

The title of Duke of Montagu has been created twice, firstly for the Montagu family of Boughton, Northamptonshire, and secondly for the Brudenell family, Earls of Cardigan. It was first created in the Peerage of England in 1705 for Ralph Montagu, 3rd Baron Montagu of Boughton, with the subsidiary title Marquess of Monthermer, but became extinct in 1749. The 1st Duke had been created Earl of Montagu and Viscount Monthermer in 1689. The Dukedom was then recreated in the Peerage of Great Britain in 1766 (together with the subsidiary title Marquess of Monthermer) for the late Duke's son-in-law George Brudenell, 4th Earl of Cardigan, who adopted the surname of Montagu. On his death in 1790 the dukedom and marquessate became extinct a second time, but the earldom passed to his brother, James Brudenell, 5th Earl of Cardigan.

The dukedom is named after the Montagu family "of Boughton" in Northamptonshire, where the 1st Duke built the splendid and surviving Boughton House, which claimed descent from the ancient Anglo-Norman family of Montagu, Earls of Salisbury, which connection is however unproven. The earliest proven ancestor of the Montagu family of Boughton is Thomas Montagu (d.1516) of Hemington, Northamptonshire, the son of Richard Ladde (d.1484), "alias Montagu", of Hanging Houghton in Northamptonshire, whose family of Ladde is recorded in the deeds of that place from 1355. Richard Ladde "alias Montagu" was the father of Sir Edward Montagu, Lord Chief Justice (great-great grandfather of the 1st Duke), who purchased the estate of Boughton in 1528. It is suggested by the Complete Peerage that the Ladde family adopted the surname of Montagu due to "having to deal with some Montagu inheritance", i.e. dictated by the terms of a bequest from a member of that family, as was common practice, requiring the legatee to adopt the surname and arms of the legator, where a branch of a family had died out in the male line. Collins Peerage suggests that the Montagu family of Boughton was descended from James "Montagu", a natural son of Thomas Montagu, 4th Earl of Salisbury (1388-1428), the maternal grandfather of "Warwick the King-Maker", 16th Earl of Warwick, 6th Earl of Salisbury. The Montagu family of Boughton and its descendants use the coat of arms of Montagu, Earls of Salisbury, but differenced by a bordure sable, and quarters the arms of Monthermer, as did the Earls of Salisbury, but undifferenced.

Sir Edward Montagu of Boughton, Lord Chief Justice, was the ancestor of Montagu, Duke of Montagu, Montagu, Earls and Dukes of Manchester, Montagu, Earls of Sandwich and Montagu, Earls of Halifax.

== Earls of Montagu (1689) ==
Other titles: Baron Montagu of Boughton (1621)

- Ralph Montagu, 3rd Baron Montagu of Boughton, 1st Earl of Montagu (1638–c. 1709) (created Duke of Montagu in 1705)

== Dukes of Montagu, first Creation (1705) ==
Other titles: Earl of Montagu (1689) and Baron Montagu of Boughton (1621)

- Ralph Montagu, 1st Duke of Montagu (1638–c. 1709) was a courtier and diplomat
- John Montagu, 2nd Duke of Montagu (1690–1749), only son of the 1st Duke, died without male issue

== Dukes of Montagu, second Creation (1766) ==
Other titles: Marquess of Monthermer (1766), Earl of Cardigan (1661), Baron Brudenell of Stonton, in the county of Leicester (1628) and Baron Montagu of Boughton, in the county Northampton (1786)

- George Montagu, 1st Duke of Montagu (1712–1790), son-in-law of the 2nd Duke of the first creation.
  - John Montagu, Marquess of Monthermer (1735–1770), only son of the 1st Duke, predeceased his father unmarried.

== Family tree ==
Montagu family tree— Manchester: Earls and Dukes, Montagu: and Earls and Dukes, and Monthermer: Viscounts and Marquesses

Edward Montagu c. 1485–1557
Edward Montagu c. 1530–1602
Baron Montagu of Boughton, 1621 | Viscount Mandeville and Baron Montagu of Kimbolton, of Kimbolton in the County of Huntingdon, 1620; Earl of Manchester, 1626
Edward Montagu c. 1562–1644; 1st Baron Montagu of Boughton | Henry Montagu c. 1563–1642; 1st Earl of Manchester, etc. | Sidney Montagu c. 1572–1644
Earl of Sandwich, Viscount Hinchingbrooke, Baron Montagu of St Neots, of St Neots in the County of Huntingdon, 1660
Edward Montagu; 1616–1684; 2nd Baron Montagu of Boughton | Edward Montagu; 1602–1671; 2nd Earl of Manchester, etc. | George Montagu; 1622–1681 | Edward Montagu; 1625–1672; 1st Earl of Sandwich, etc.
Earl of Montagu and Viscount Monthermer, 1689; Duke of Montagu and Marquess of Monthermer (1st creation), 1705 | Baron Halifax, 1700; Earl of Halifax (2nd creation) and Viscount Sunbury (2nd creation), 1714
Edward Montagu c. 1636–1665 | Ralph Montagu; 1638–1709; 1st Duke of Montagu, etc., 3rd Baron Montagu of Boughton | Robert Montagu; 1634–1683; 3rd Earl of Manchester, etc. | Edward Montagu; 1649–1690 | Charles Montagu; 1661–1715; 1st Earl of Halifax etc., 1st Baron Halifax | Edward Montagu; 1647/48–1688; 2nd Earl of Sandwich, etc.
Earldom of Halifax (2nd creation) and Viscount Sunbury extinct, 1715
Duke of Manchester, 1719 | Earl of Halifax (3rd creation) and Viscount Sunbury (3rd creation), 1714
John Montagu; 1690–1749; 2nd Duke of Montagu, etc., 4th Baron Montagu of Boughton | Charles Edward Montagu c. 1662–1722; 1st Duke of Manchester, 4th Earl of Manchester, etc. | George Montagu; 1685–1739; 1st Earl of Halifax, etc., 2nd Baron Halifax | Edward Montagu; 1670–1729; 3rd Earl of Sandwich, etc.
Dukedom of Montagu (1st creation) and subsidiary titles extinct, 1749
Duke of Montagu (2nd creation) and Marquess of Monthermer (2nd creation), 1766; Baron Montagu of Boughton (3rd creation), 1776
George Brudenell; 1712–1790; Duke of Montagu, etc., Earl of Cardigan; 1st Baron Montagu of Boughton | Mary Montagu c. 1711–1775 | Isabella Montagu d. 1786 | William Montagu; 1700–1739; 2nd Duke of Manchester, 5th Earl of Manchester, etc. | Robert Montagu c. 1710–1762; 3rd Duke of Manchester, 6th Earl of Manchester, etc. | George Montagu-Dunk; 1716–1771; 2nd Earl of Halifax, etc., 3rd Baron Halifax | Edward Montagu; 1692–1722 styled Viscount Hinchingbrooke | John Montagu; 1718–1792; 4th Earl of Sandwich, etc.
Dukedom of Montagu (2nd creation) and subsidiary titles extinct, 1790 | Earldom of Halifax (3rd creation) and subsidiary titles extinct, 1771
Baron Montagu of Boughton (2nd creation), 1762
John Montagu; 1735–1770; Baron Montagu of Boughton, styled Marquess of Monthermer | Elizabeth Montagu; 1743–1827 | George Montagu; 1737–1788; 4th Duke of Manchester, 7th Earl of Manchester, etc. | Elizabeth Montague-Dunk d. 1768 | John Montagu; 1744–1814; 5th Earl of Sandwich, etc.
Baron Montagu of Boughton (2nd creation) extinct, 1770
Henry Montagu-Scott; 1776–1845; 2nd Baron Montagu of Boughton | George Montagu; 1763–1772 styled Viscount Mandeville | William Montagu; 1771–1843; 5th Duke of Manchester, 8th Earl of Manchester, etc. | John George Montagu; 1767–1790 styled Viscount Hinchinbroke | George John Montagu; 1773–1818; 6th Earl of Sandwich, etc.
Baron Montagu of Boughton (3rd creation) extinct, 1845
George Montagu; 1799–1855; 6th Duke of Manchester, 9th Earl of Manchester, etc.
William Drogo Montagu; 1823–1890; 7th Duke of Manchester, 10th Earl of Manchester, etc. | Robert Montagu; 1825–1902 | John William Montagu; 1811–1884; 7th Earl of Sandwich, etc.
George Victor Drogo Montagu; 1853–1892; 8th Duke of Manchester, 11th Earl of Manchester, etc. | Robert Acheson Cromie Montagu; 1854–1931 | Edward George Henry Montagu; 1839–1916; 8th Earl of Sandwich, etc. | Victor Alexander Montagu; 1841–1915
William Angus Drogo Montagu; 1877–1947; 9th Duke of Manchester, 12th Earl of Manchester, etc. | John Michael Cromie Montagu; 1881–1966 | George Charles Montagu; 1874–1962; 9th Earl of Sandwich, etc.
Alexander George Francis Drogo Montagu; 1902–1977; 10th Duke of Manchester, 13th Earl of Manchester, etc. | Robert Alexander Montagu; 1917–1996 | Alexander Victor Edward Paulet Montagu; 1906–1995; 10th Earl of Sandwich, etc.
Sidney Arthur Robin George Drogo Montagu; 1929–1985; 11th Duke of Manchester, 14th Earl of Manchester, etc. | Angus Charles Drogo Montagu; 1938–2002; 12th Duke of Manchester, 15th Earl of Manchester, etc. | John Edward Hollister Montagu; 1943–2025; 11th Earl of Sandwich, etc.
Alexander Charles David Drogo Montagu b. 1962; 13th Duke of Manchester, 16th Earl of Manchester, etc. | Kimble William Drogo Montagu b. 1964 | Emma Louise Eveleen Montagu Hodgkinson; 1965–2014 | Michael Anthony Montagu b. 1955 | Luke Timothy Charles Montagu b. 1969; 12th Earl of Sandwich, etc.
Heir presumptive to the dukedom of Manchester
William James Hayman Montagu b. 2004 styled Viscount Hinchingbrooke
Heir apparent to the earldom of Sandwich
