= House of Montagu =

British noble family

Montagu
- Arms of Montagu, Earls of Salisbury: Argent, three fusils conjoined in fess gules, usually shown quartering Monthermer
- Country: United Kingdom
- Founded: 1066; 960 years ago
- Founder: Drogo de Montaigu
- Current head: Alexander Montagu, 13th Duke of Manchester
- Titles: Duke of Montagu; Duke of Manchester; Earl of Montagu; Earl of Manchester; Earl of Salisbury; Earl of Sandwich; Viscount Montagu; Baron Montagu; Baron Montagu of Kimbolton; Baron Montagu of St Neots; Baron Montagu of Boughton; Baron Montagu of Beaulieu
- Motto: Latin: Equitas Actionum Regula ("Let equity be the rule of our actions")
- Estates: Current: Boughton House; Mapperton House; Beaulieu Palace House; Former: Montagu House, Bloomsbury; Montacute House; Kimbolton Castle; Horton Hall; Tandragee Castle; Hinchingbrooke House; Montagu House, Portman Square; Montagu House, Blackheath; Montagu House, Whitehall; Barnwell Manor
- Cadet branches: Montagues of Boveney (allegedly)

The House of Montagu (/ˈmɒntəɡjuː/, MON-tə-ghew), also known throughout history as Montagud, Montaigu, Montague, Montacute (Latin: de Monte Acuto, lit. 'from the sharp mountain'; French: Mont Aigu), is an English noble family founded in Somerset after the Norman Conquest of 1066 by the Norman warrior Drogo de Montagud (so named in the Domesday Book). They rose to their highest power and prominence in the 14th and 15th centuries as Earls of Salisbury, the last in the male line being Thomas Montagu, 4th Earl of Salisbury (1388–1428), the maternal grandfather of "Warwick the Kingmaker", 16th Earl of Warwick and 6th Earl of Salisbury.

Arms of Montagu of Boughton: Arms of Montagu, Earls of Salisbury, with a bordure sable for difference

The surviving noble family of Montagu "of Boughton" in Northamptonshire, where in 1683 the 1st Duke of Montagu built the splendid and surviving Boughton House, claimed descent from the ancient Anglo-Norman family of Montagu, Earls of Salisbury. However, the connection is unproven. The earliest proven ancestor of the Montagu family of Boughton is Thomas Montagu (d. 1516) of Hemington, Northamptonshire, the son of Richard Ladde (d. 1484), "alias Montagu", of Hanging Houghton in Northamptonshire, whose family of Ladde is recorded in the deeds of that place from 1355. Richard Ladde "alias Montagu" was the father of Sir Edward Montagu, Lord Chief Justice (great-great-grandfather of the 1st Duke), who purchased the estate of Boughton in 1528. It is suggested by the Complete Peerage that the Ladde family adopted the surname of Montagu due to "having to deal with some Montagu inheritance", i.e. dictated by the terms of a bequest from a member of that family, as was common practice, requiring the legatee to adopt the surname and arms of the legator, where a branch of a family had died out in the male line. Collins Peerage suggests that the Montagu family of Boughton was descended from James "Montagu", a natural son of Thomas Montagu, 4th Earl of Salisbury. The Montagu family of Boughton and its descendants use the coat of arms of Montagu, Earls of Salisbury, but differenced by a bordure sable, and quarters the arms of Monthermer, as did the Earls of Salisbury, but undifferenced.

Sir Edward Montagu was the ancestor of (Montagu) Duke of Montagu, (Montagu) Earls and Dukes of Manchester, (Montagu) Earls of Sandwich, (Montagu) Earls of Halifax, as well as the extant Montagu Baronies of Kimbolton, St Neots and Beaulieu. The head of the family is the Duke of Manchester.

A cadet branch of the family lived in Boveney near Burnham, Buckinghamshire. The earliest recorded ancestor of this branch is Robert Montague (c. 1528–1575), who bore the coat of arms of Simon de Montagu. It is not known when this branch separated from the main line. Since they possess the same coat of arms as Simon de Montagu, it would put the Boveney Montagues separation from the main line some time after 1300.

== Drogo de Montagud ==
The founder of the English family of Montagu was "Drogo de Montagud", as his name appeared in its Latinised form in the Domesday Book of 1086. From his pattern of landholdings he appears to have been a knight or follower of Robert, Count of Mortain, the half-brother of King William the Conqueror. Most of his sixteen English estates listed in the Domesday Book were held from Robert, Count of Mortain as his feudal overlord, with only one held directly from the king, namely Knowle. His principal landholdings were in the Hundred of Wincanton in Somerset, near Bruton Priory where some of the early family were buried. His Domesday Book holdings included:

=== Held in-chief ===
==== Knowle ====
Chenolle (Knowle) (in the Hundred of Wincanton), held in-chief from the crown. In the Domesday Book entry for Chenolle he is called "Drogo de Montagud". The ancient estate is situated between the villages of Shepton Montagu and Stoney Stoke, on the east side of a knoll or hill, now represented by Knowle Park Farm, 1.5 km east of Shepton Montagu Church, and by Knowle Rock Farm, 0.8 km further east. Grants of free warren were obtained for Knowle in 1314 and 1317 and a deer park was in existence in 1397, which in 1569 was a mile "in compass". It was retained by the Montagu family until the extinction of the senior male line on the death of Thomas Montagu, 4th Earl of Salisbury (1388–1428) when it passed through his daughter to the Neville family.

=== Held from Robert, Count of Mortain ===
==== Shepton Montague ====
Sceptone (now Shepton Montague) (in the Hundred of Wincanton), held from Robert, Count of Mortain. He is named simply as "Drogo" in the Domesday Book entry.

==== Stony Stoke ====
Stoche (now Stoney Stoke) (in the Hundred of Wincanton). It was an addition to the manor of Sceptone, thus also held from Robert, Count of Mortain. He is named simply as "Drogo" in the Domesday Book entry.

==== Bishopstone ====
1787 engraving by Thomas Bonner of Montacute House, viewed from east, with St Michael's Hill (the "sharpness" of which is greatly exaggerated) at left (the summit of which is 620 metres south-west of the Montacute House)

Biscopestone in the hundred of Tintinhull, Somerset. Now Bishopstone, the site of Montacute Priory within the village of Montacute, and to the immediate north of the Priory the Elizabethan mansion Montacute House. In this manor Robert, Count of Mortain "has his castle, which is called "Montagud" (Ipse Comes (Moriton) tenet in dominio Biscopestone et ibi est castellum eius quod vocatur Montagud The summit of St Michael's Hill is situated 620 metres south-west of the present Montacute House. It became known at some time before 1086 by the Latin name of Mons Acutus, meaning "Sharp Mountain", being referred to in the Domesday Book "Montagud". One of the Count's four tenants at Biscopestone is named in the Domesday Book as "Drogo", who held one hide, believed to be the "Drogo de Montagud", the tenant of Chenolle (Knowle). This has added some mystery to the origin of the surname "de Montagu". It is stated in some sources that the English de Montagu family, Earls of Salisbury, took its surname from its supposed manor of origin in Normandy, said to be Montaigu-les-Bois, in the arrondissement of Coutances, which remained in the possession of a French family called "de Montaigu" until the death of Sebastien de Montaigu in 1715, without children. According to the Duchess of Cleveland (Battle Abbey Roll, 1889): "(Drogo de Montaigu) had come to England in the train of the Earl of Mortain, and received from him large grants of lands, with the custody of the castle, built either by the Earl or his son William, in the manor of Bishopston, and styled, from its position on a sharp-topped hill, Monte Acuto" (sic, Mons Acutus). The French spelling "Mont-Aigu" means "sharp mountain", and the family's name was Latinised as de Monte Acuto (ablative form of Mons Acutus - "from the Sharp Mountain"). Authorities are not agreed as to whether the family was named after the hill in Bishopton, or whether the hill, village, parish and priory, were named after the family, thus ultimately after Montaigu-les-Bois in Normandy.

==== Tintinhull ====
Tintehalle (Tintinhull), in the Hundred of Tintinhull, situated 1.5 miles north of Bishopstone.

==== Thorne ====
Torne (Thorne), in the hundred of Stone, Somerset, situated 3.4 km east of Bishopstone. Held from Robert, Count of Mortain. At some time before 1160 Drogo donated land at Thorne and at Bishopstone to Montacute Priory and made grants to Bruton Priory, where he was buried.

Montagues of Boveney Controversy

The earliest proven ancestor of this cadet branch is Robert Montague (c. 1528 - 1575), who was a tenant farmer and held 30 acres of land from the Lord of Cippenham in Buckinghamshire. He married Margaret Cotton the daughter of Roger Cotton, who resided in Berkshire. Robert bore the coat of arms of Simon de Montagu, but this lineage cannot be established. The separation from the main family line would have been around 1300.

The origin of how Robert acquired Simon's coat of arms is unknown but research has stated that "Whatever may have been the origin of the pellets, the fact still remains, that the Boveney family bear the Arms of Sir Simon Montague of A.D. 1300, which arms were also born by his son lord William Montacute and by his grandson the first Earl of Salisbury. Heraldry, or more properly Armory, is the short hand of History, its purpose was to identify persons and property and to record descent and alliance. Hundreds of persons may be entitled to the same initials, may possess precisely the same names; but only the members of a particular family can lawfully bear certain armorial ensigns, and the various branches of even that family have their separate differences to distinguish one from the other. The Boveney family bear the same name as the descendants of Drogo". However, professional genealogist Myrtle Stevens Hyde mentioned this family line can only be traced to Robert Montague and the professional stance on this family is that they assumed the surname Montague in the early 1500s, and were originally a family called Elot in Berkshire.

The Boveney Branch of Montagues eventually became prosperous land owners as well as tenants between the 15th and 18th centuries. One descendant was Reverend Lawrence Montague served as the Vicar of Dorney and his son Richard was educated at King's College and eventually became the Dean of Hereford College. Another descendant of this family line was Peter Montague who became the first Montague to immigrate to Jamestown, Virginia in November 1621. He became a wealthy land owner along the Charles River in Virginia and served on the Virginia House of Burgesses between 1651 and 1658.

Peter's descendants include Robert Latane Montague, a Virginia politician and Robert's son Andrew Jackson Montague, who served as the 44th governor of Virginia. Another prominent descendant of Peter was Bessie Wallis Warfield, who married Edward VIII, Duke of Windsor.

=== Montague Y-DNA Project ===
The Montague Y-DNA Project is a surname DNA project including all the variations of the surname Montague such as Montagu, Montaigu, Montacue, etc. Y-chromosome analysis shows that there are multiple unrelated male lines in the Montague DNA Project and some, such as the Montagues of Boveney, claim descent from the original family line of Drogo as stated in the DNA Project "By 1603 the heraldry used by the Montague family of Sutton Montis came into use by the Montague family of Boveney and Winkfield, the most prominent of them was Richard Montague Bishop of Chichester and Norwich.

The transfer cannot be explained nor can the sudden rise in wealth, especially for the Winkfield branch who achieved the status of Gentleman prior to 1633. William Mountague of Boveney had his arms and pedigree entered into the 1634 Heralds Visitation of Buckinghamshire and showed the connection to Richard Montague Bishop of Chichester and Norwich and also that of Peter and Richard Mountague who both emigrated to America early in the 17th century". To date there is no bearer of the Montague surname that traces back to Drogo, so it is not known which Y-DNA group belongs to Drogo's descendants.

== Notable members ==
- Sir Edward Montagu (c. 1488–1557)
  - Sir Edward Montagu (c. 1530–1602)
    - Edward Montagu, 1st Baron Montagu of Boughton (c. 1562–1644)
      - Edward Montagu, 2nd Baron Montagu of Boughton (1616–1684)
        - Edward Montagu (c. 1636–1665)
        - Ralph Montagu, 1st Duke of Montagu (1638–1709)
          - John Montagu, 2nd Duke of Montagu
            - Lady Isabella Montagu (c. 1706–1786)
            - Lady Mary Montagu (c. 1711–1775)
      - Sir William Montagu (c. 1618–1706)
    - Henry Montagu, 1st Earl of Manchester (c. 1563–1642)
      - Edward Montagu, 2nd Earl of Manchester (1602–1671)
        - Robert Montagu, 3rd Earl of Manchester (1634–1683)
          - Charles Montagu, 1st Duke of Manchester (c. 1662–1722)
            - William Montagu, 2nd Duke of Manchester (1700–1739)
            - Lady Charlotte Montagu (1705–1759)
            - Robert Montagu, 3rd Duke of Manchester (c. 1710–1762)
              - George Montagu, 4th Duke of Manchester (1737–1788)
                - Lady Caroline Maria Montagu (1770–1847)
                - William Montagu, 5th Duke of Manchester (1771–1843)
                  - George Montagu, 6th Duke of Manchester (1799–1855)
                    - William Montagu, 7th Duke of Manchester (1823–1892)
                      - George Montagu, 8th Duke of Manchester (1853–1892)
                        - William Montagu, 9th Duke of Manchester (1877–1947)
                          - Alexander Montagu, 10th Duke of Manchester (1902–1977)
                            - Sidney Montagu, 11th Duke of Manchester (1929–1985)
                            - Angus Montagu, 12th Duke of Manchester (1938–2002)
                              - Alexander Montagu, 13th Duke of Manchester (born 1962)
                      - Lady Mary Louise Montagu (1854–1934)
                      - Lady Louisa Montagu (1856–1944)
                      - Lady Alice Montagu (1862–1957)
                    - Lord Robert Montagu (1825–1902)
                    - Lady Olivia Susan Montagu (1830–1922)
                - Lord Frederick Montagu (1774–1827)
              - Lord Charles Montagu (1741–1783)
          - Robert Montagu (died 1693)
          - Heneage Montagu (1675–1698)
      - Walter Montagu (c. 1603–1677)
      - James Montagu (died 1666)
        - James Montagu (1639–1676)
          - Edward Montagu (1672–1710)
          - James Montagu (1673–1747)
            - James Montagu (1713–1790)
              - George Montagu (1753–1815)
            - John Montagu (1719–1795)
              - Sir George Montagu (1750–1829)
              - James Montagu (1752–1794)
              - Edward Montagu (1755–1799)
                - John Montagu (1797–1853)
      - George Montagu (1622–1681)
        - Edward Montagu (1649–1690)
          - George Montagu, 1st Earl of Halifax (c. 1684–1739)
            - George Montagu-Dunk, 2nd Earl of Halifax (1716–1771)
          - Edward Montagu (died 1738)
            - George Montagu (1713–1780)
            - Sir Charles Montagu (died 1777)
        - Charles Montagu, 1st Earl of Halifax (1661–1715)
        - Sir James Montagu (1666–1723)
          - Charles Montagu (died 1759)
            - Frederick Montagu (1733–1800)
    - Sir Charles Montagu (c. 1564–1625)
    - James Montague (c. 1568–1618)
    - Sir Sidney Montagu (died 1644)
      - Edward Montagu, 1st Earl of Sandwich (1625–1672)
        - Edward Montagu, 2nd Earl of Sandwich (1648–1688)
          - Edward Montagu, 3rd Earl of Sandwich (1670–1729)
            - Edward Montagu, Viscount Hinchingbrooke (1692–1722))
              - John Montagu, 4th Earl of Sandwich (1718–1792)
                - John Montagu, 5th Earl of Sandwich (1744–1814)
                  - George Montagu, 6th Earl of Sandwich (1773–1818)
                    - Lady Harriet Mary Montagu (1805–1857)
                    - John Montagu, 7th Earl of Sandwich (1811–1884)
                      - Edward Montagu, 8th Earl of Sandwich (1839–1916)
                      - Victor Montagu (1841–1915)
                        - George Montagu, 9th Earl of Sandwich (1874–1962)
                          - Victor Montagu (1906–1995)
                            - John Montagu, 11th Earl of Sandwich (1943–2025)
                              - Luke Montagu, 12th Earl of Sandwich (born 1969)
                          - Lady Mary Faith Montagu (1911–1983)
                          - Lady Elizabeth Montagu (1917–2006)
                  - William Augustus Montagu (1785–1852)
                - Robert Montagu (1763–1830)
                - Basil Montagu (1770–1851)
              - William Montagu (c. 1720–1757)
        - Sidney Wortley Montagu (1650–1727)
          - Edward Wortley Montagu (1678–1761)
            - Mary Wortley Montagu (1718–1794)
            - Edward Wortley Montagu (1713–1776)
        - Oliver Montagu (c. 1655–1689)
        - John Montagu (c. 1655–1729)
        - Charles Montagu (died 1721)
          - Edward Montagu (1692–1776)
          - John Montagu (died 1734)

== Titles of the Montagu family ==
=== Montagu ===
- Baron Montagu; first creation (1299; extinct 1539)
- Earl of Salisbury; second creation (1337; extinct or abeyant 1471)
- Baron Montagu; second creation (1342; extinct 1375)
- Baron Montagu; third creation (1357; extinct 1539)

=== Ladde-Montagu ===
For titles conferred on the Ladde "alias Montagu" family, descended from Sir Edward Montagu (1485–1557) of Boughton, Lord Chief Justice, see :

==== Duke of Manchester ====
- Baron Montagu of Kimbolton (1620; extant) a subsidiary title of the Duke of Manchester
- Viscount Mandeville (1620; extant) a subsidiary title of the Duke of Manchester
- Earl of Manchester (1626; extant) a subsidiary title of the Duke of Manchester
- Duke of Manchester (1719; extant)

==== Duke of Montagu (First Creation) ====
- Baron Montagu of Boughton (1621; extinct 1749) a subsidiary title of the Earl, then Duke of Montagu
- Earl of Montagu (1689; extinct 1749) a subsidiary title of the Duke of Montagu
- Duke of Montagu; First Creation (1705; extinct 1749)

==== Earl of Sandwich ====
- Baron Montagu of St Neots (1660; extant) a subsidiary title of the Earl of Sandwich
- Viscount Hinchingbrooke (1660; extant) a subsidiary title of the Earl of Sandwich
- Earl of Sandwich

=== Brudenell-Montagu ===
For titles conferred on the family of Brudenell, Earl of Cardigan, descendants via a female line, who adopted the name and arms of Montagu, see:

- Baron Montagu of Boughton; first creation (1762; extinct 1770)
- Duke of Montagu; second creation (1766; extinct 1790)
- Baron Montagu of Boughton; second creation (1786; extinct 1845). This title passed on the family of Scott.

==== Douglas-Scott-Montagu ====
Title conferred on the family of Douglas-Scott-Montagu, descendants via a female line of the Brudenell-Montagu line:

- Baron Montagu of Beaulieu (1885; extant)

=== Browne-Montagu ===
Title conferred on the line of Browne, maternal descendants who retook the name and arms of Montagu, see:

- Viscount Montagu (1554; dormant 1797)
