= Mary Montagu, Duchess of Montagu =

Mary Montagu, Duchess of Montagu may refer to:

- Mary Montagu, Duchess of Montagu (1689–1751)
- Mary Montagu, Duchess of Montagu (1711–1775)
