= 69th Regiment of Foot (disambiguation) =

Two regiments of the British Army have been numbered the 69th Regiment of Foot:

- 69th Regiment of Foot (1745), or Montagu's Ordnance Regiment, raised in 1745 and disbanded in 1746
- 69th (South Lincolnshire) Regiment of Foot, raised in 1756 and renumbered 1758.
