= John Montagu, Marquess of Monthermer =

British peer

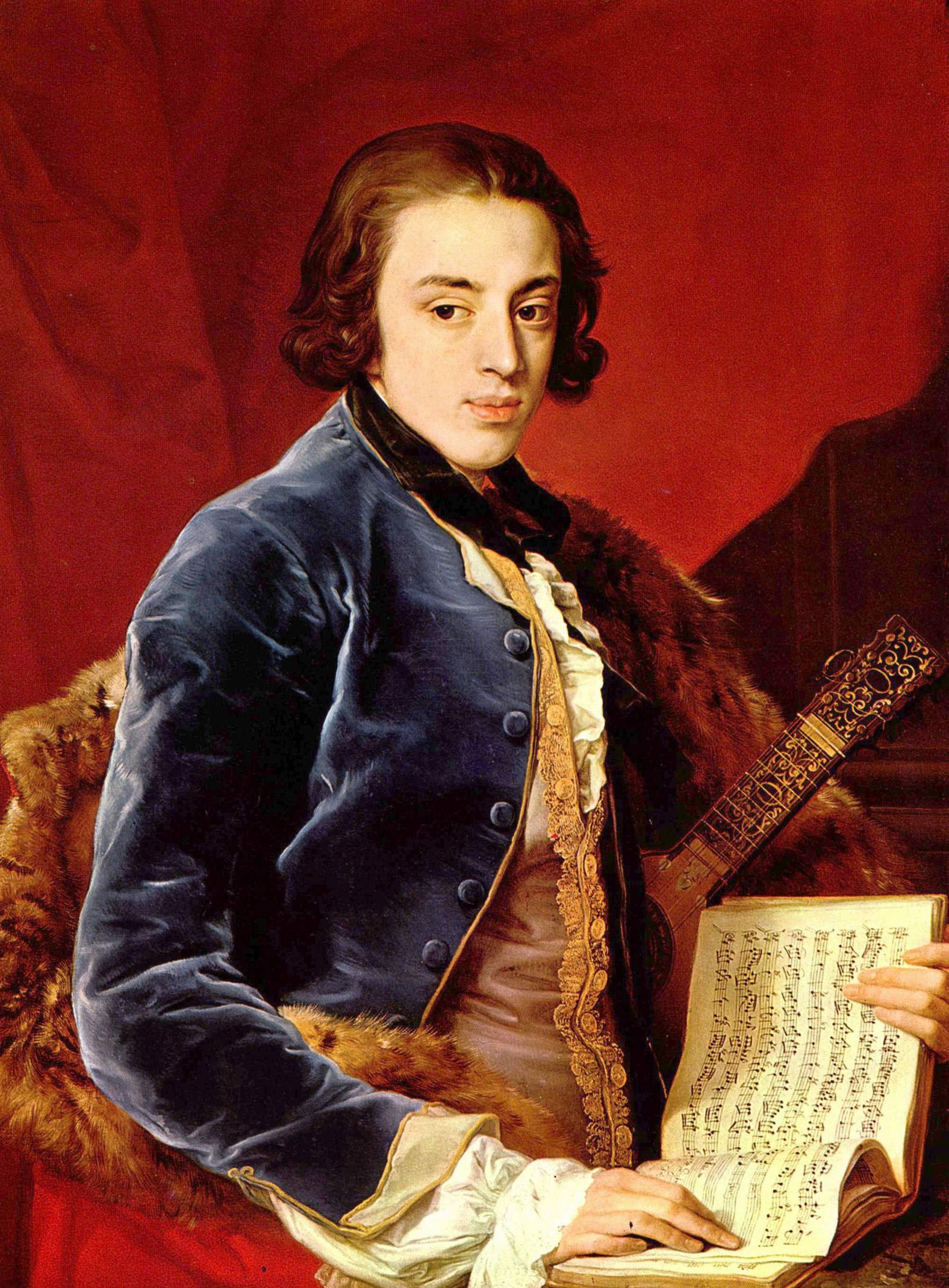
- John Montagu, Marquess of Monthermer. Pompeo Batoni, 1764

Member of Parliament for Marlborough
- In office ?

Personal details
- Born: 18 March 1735
- Died: 11 April 1770 (aged 35)
- Party: Tory
- Parents: George Brudenell (father); Mary Montagu (mother)
- Relatives: Elizabeth Scott (sister); John Montagu (grandfather); Mary Churchill (grandmother); George Brudenell (grandfather); Elizabeth Bruce (grandmother)

John Montagu, Marquess of Monthermer, 1st Baron Montagu of Boughton (18 March 1735 – 11 April 1770) was a British peer.

== Life ==
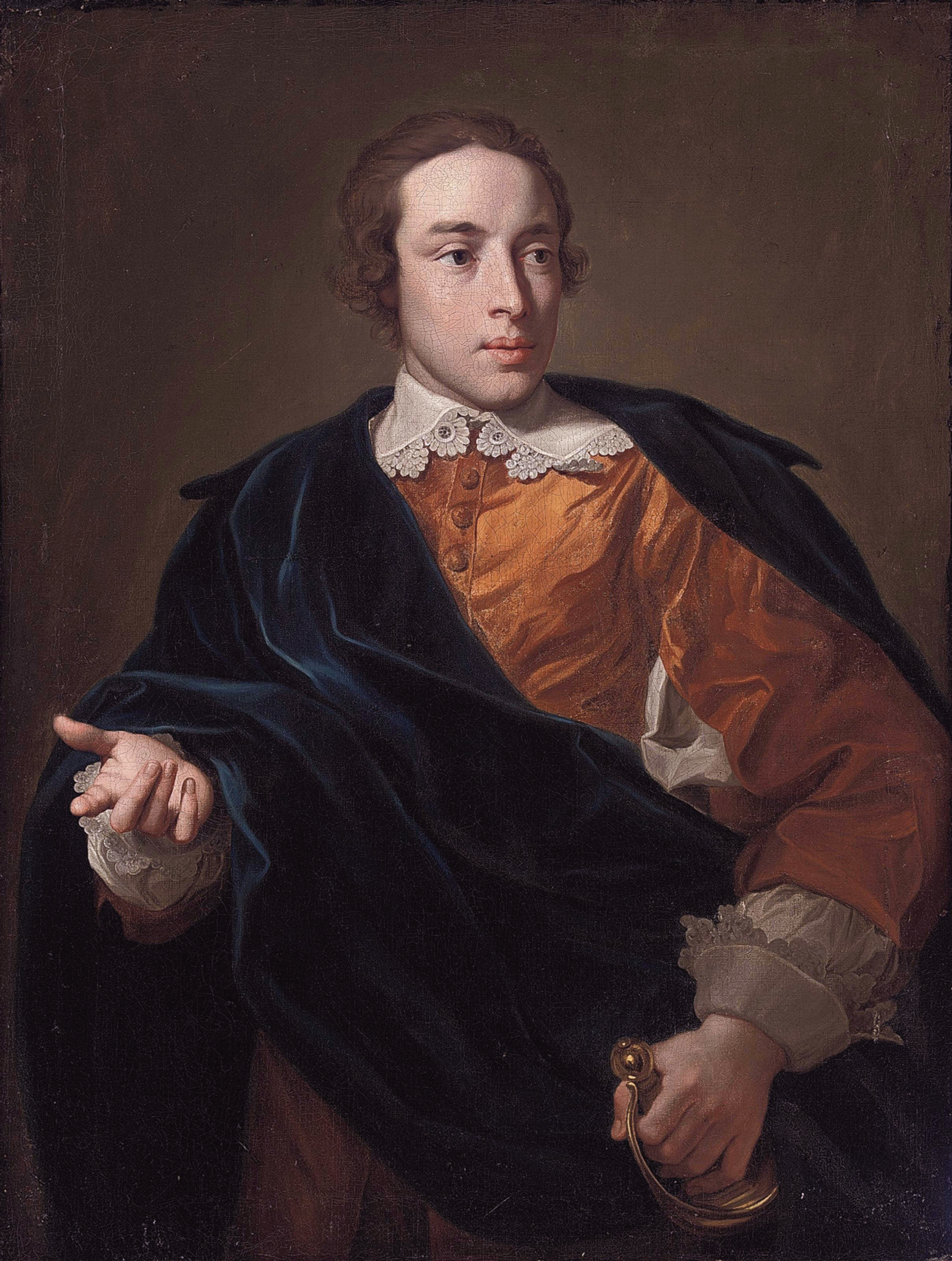
John Brudenell-Montagu, later Marquess of Monthermer (1735-1770) (Thomas Jenkins (attr.))

He was born John Brudenell, the eldest son of George Brudenell, 4th Earl of Cardigan, by his wife Mary, daughter of John Montagu, 2nd Duke of Montagu. As heir-apparent to the Earldom of Cardigan, he was styled Lord Brudenell from birth. He was educated at Eton College, which he entered in 1748.

In 1749 the Duke of Montagu died, and his son-in-law Lord Cardigan inherited his estates. He and his children duly adopted the surname Montagu in lieu of that of Brudenell. One of the Montagu family titles was revived in the person of Lord Brudenell when he was created Baron Montagu of Boughton, of Boughton in the county of Northampton, on 8 May 1762. The Earl of Cardigan was created first Duke of Montagu of the second creation on 5 November 1766, and his son assumed the courtesy title Marquess of Monthermer.

Prior to his elevation to the peerage, Lord Brudenell was briefly a Tory Member of Parliament for Marlborough, sitting for the borough along with his uncle Colonel Robert Brudenell. In 1764 his portrait was painted by Pompeo Batoni.

Lord Monthermer died on 11 April 1770 at the age of thirty-five, unmarried. As he left no children, his barony of Montagu became extinct, but was recreated for his father on 21 August 1786, with remainder to the younger sons of his sister Elizabeth, Duchess of Buccleuch.

Peerage of Great Britain
New creation	Baron Montagu of Boughton; 1762–1770	Extinct
