= George Montagu, 1st Duke of Montagu =

British noble

His Grace The Duke of Montagu KG PC FRS
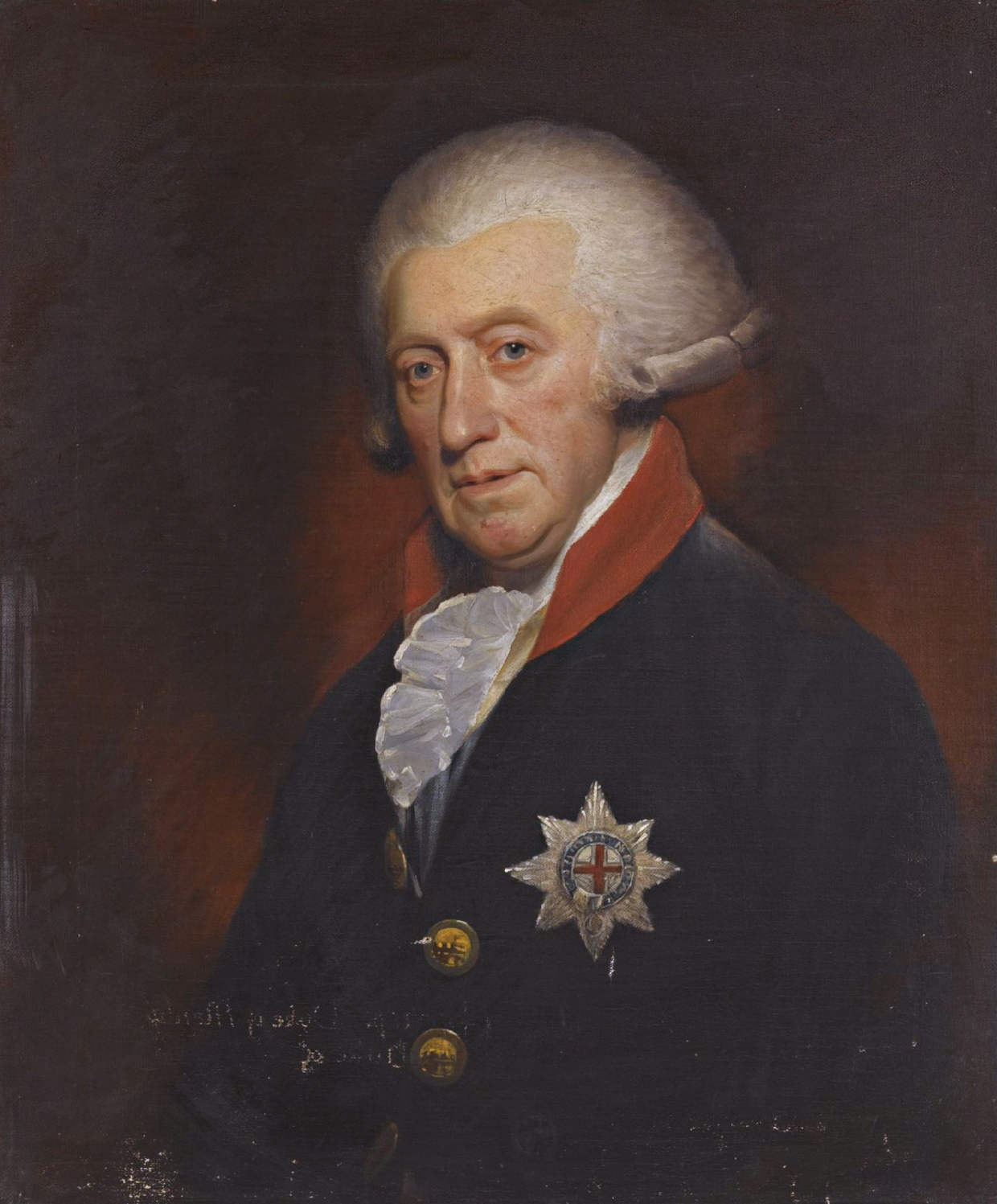
- The Duke of Montagu.

Master of the Horse
- In office 1780–1790
- Monarch: George III
- Preceded by: The Duke of Northumberland
- Succeeded by: Marquess of Graham

Personal details
- Born: 26 July 1712 Cardigan House, Lincoln's Inn Fields, London, England
- Died: 23 May 1790 (aged 77) Privy Gardens, Whitehall, London
- Spouse: Lady Mary Montagu (m. 1730)
- Children: John Montagu, Marquess of Monthermer; Elizabeth Scott, Duchess of Buccleuch
- Parents: George Brudenell, 3rd Earl of Cardigan; Lady Elizabeth Bruce
- Education: Queen's College, Oxford

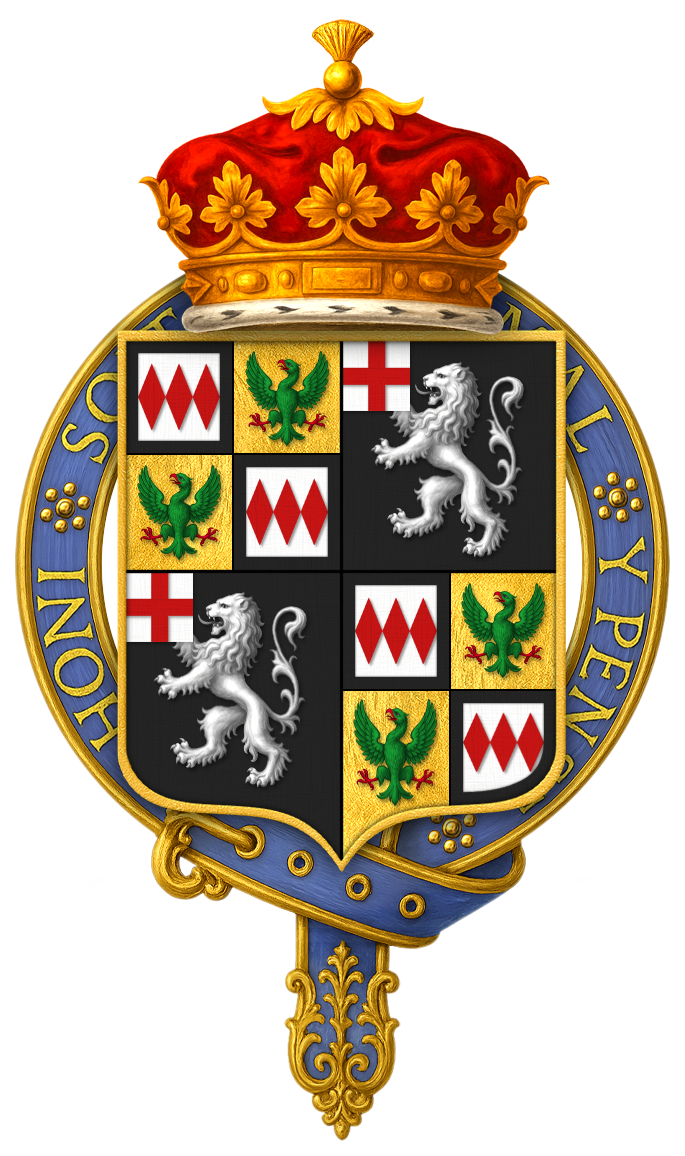
Quartered arms of George Montagu, 1st Duke of Montagu, KG

George Montagu, Duke of Montagu KG, PC, FRS (26 July 1712 – 23 May 1790) styled Lord Brudenell until 1732 and known as the Earl of Cardigan between 1732 and 1766, was a British peer.

== Background and education ==
He was born George Brudenell at Cardigan House, Lincoln's Inn Fields, in London, the eldest son of George Brudenell, 3rd Earl of Cardigan, and his wife Lady Elizabeth Bruce, daughter of Thomas Bruce, 3rd Earl of Elgin. He was baptised on 1 August 1712 at St Giles-in-the-Fields. He was the elder brother of James Brudenell, 5th Earl of Cardigan, the Honourable Robert Brudenell and Thomas Brudenell-Bruce, 1st Earl of Ailesbury. He matriculated at Queen's College, Oxford, on 1 July 1726 and graduated from there on 31 January 1729 with a Master of Arts degree.

== Public life ==
Brudenell succeeded his father in the earldom in 1732. In 1742 he was appointed Justice in Eyre north of the Trent, a post he held until 1752. He inherited the estates of his father-in-law, the 2nd and last Duke of Montagu (see below), in 1749, and assumed the surname "Montagu" for himself and his children on 15 July 1749. In 1752 he was made a Knight of the Garter and made Constable and Governor of Windsor Castle, which he remained until his death. In the 1750s he was a president of St Luke's Hospital for Lunatics. In 1766 he was created Marquess of Monthermer and Duke of Montagu, revivals of the titles which had become extinct on his father-in-law's death.

His only son, John Montagu, Marquess of Monthermer, had been created a peer in his own right in 1762 as Baron Montagu of Boughton, but died unmarried in 1770, and, with no male heirs, Montagu was created Baron Montagu of Boughton, of Boughton in the County of Northampton, in 1776, with a special remainder to the younger sons of his daughter Elizabeth, who had married Henry Scott, 3rd Duke of Buccleuch. He was sworn of the Privy Council the same year. He later served as Master of the Horse from 1780 to 1790 and as Lord Lieutenant of Huntingdonshire from 1789 to 1790.

== Family ==
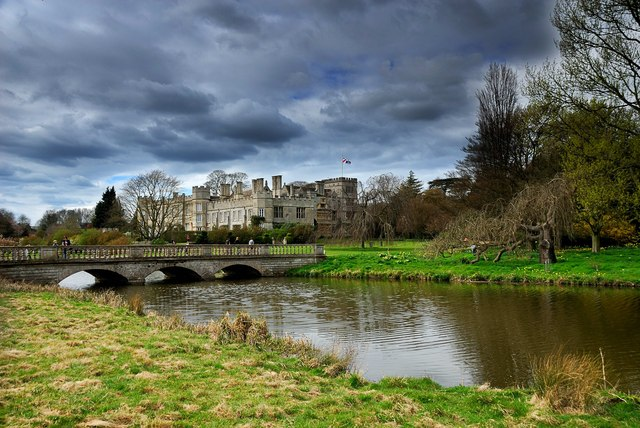
Deene Park, Northamptonshire - seat of the Brudenell family

Montagu married Lady Mary Montagu, daughter of John Montagu, 2nd Duke of Montagu (of the first creation), on 7 July 1730 at St Giles-in-the-Fields. They had two children who survived infancy:

- John Montagu, Marquess of Monthermer and 1st Baron Montagu of Boughton (18 March 1735–11 April 1770)
- Lady Elizabeth Montagu (29 May 1743– 21 November 1827), who married Henry Scott, 3rd Duke of Buccleuch and had issue.

The Duchess of Montagu died in May 1775. The Duke of Montagu died at Privy Gardens, Whitehall, London, in May 1790, aged 77, without surviving male issue. The marquessate and dukedom became extinct, the earldom of Cardigan and its associated titles passed to his brother, Lord Brudenell, and the barony of Montagu passed to his grandson, Lord Henry Scott (who assumed the surname "Montagu-Scott", and on whose death the barony became extinct).

Legal offices
Preceded by The Duke of Ancaster and Kesteven	Justice in Eyre north of the Trent; 1742–1752	Succeeded by The Duke of Somerset
Political offices
Preceded by The Duke of Northumberland	Master of the Horse; 1780–1790	Succeeded by Marquess of Graham
Honorary titles
Preceded by The Duke of St Albans	Constable and Governor of Windsor Castle; 1752–1790	Succeeded by The Earl of Cardigan
Preceded by The Duke of Manchester	Lord Lieutenant of Huntingdonshire; 1789–1790	Succeeded by Marquess of Graham
Peerage of England
Preceded by George Brudenell	Earl of Cardigan; 1732–1790	Succeeded by James Brudenell
Peerage of Great Britain
New title	Duke of Montagu; 1766–1790	Extinct
New title	Baron Montagu of Boughton; 1786–1790	Succeeded by Henry Scott
