= 69th Regiment of Foot (1745) =

69th Regiment of Foot Montagu's Ordnance Regiment
- The coat of arms of the Duke of Montagu
- Active: 1745–1746
- Country: Kingdom of Great Britain
- Branch: British Army
- Type: Infantry
- Engagements: Jacobite rising of 1745

Commanders
- Colonel of the Regiment: John Montagu, 2nd Duke of Montagu

The 69th Regiment of Foot, or Duke of Montagu's Ordnance Regiment, was a regiment in the British Army from 1745 to 1746.

== History ==
In response to the Jacobite rising of 1745, the regiment was raised at Stamford by John Montagu, 2nd Duke of Montagu. Furthermore, the Duke was also colonel of the 3rd Regiment of Horse (2nd Dragoon Guards from 1746) and raised another Regiment of Horse (Montagu's Carabineers or 9th Regiment of Horse). Montagu's Regiment of Foot, also called Ordnance Regiment because the Duke was Master-General of the Ordnance, received the rank 69th.

The 69th Foot was declared "half-complete" on 22 October and considered "ready to march" on November 7.

In December, the regiment was part of Cumberland's Army that successfully besieged Carlisle. In January, the regiment was ordered to garrison Carlisle. It also detached some men to handle Jacobite prisoners. The Regiment was relieved by Richbell's Regiment of Foot (61st) in late June and left Carlisle on July 19. Heading to Kettering, it was disbanded there in the first half of August.

== Uniform ==
The actual uniform of the Regiment is unknown, but most of the regiment raised by noblemen in 1745 had blue coats and red facings. Nine gilt gorgets bearing the Duke's arms and supporters survive in Boughton House and probably belonged to officers of the Ordnance Regiment.
