= Henry Scott, 3rd Duke of Buccleuch =

British military officer (1746–1812)

His Grace The Duke of Buccleuch KG FRSE
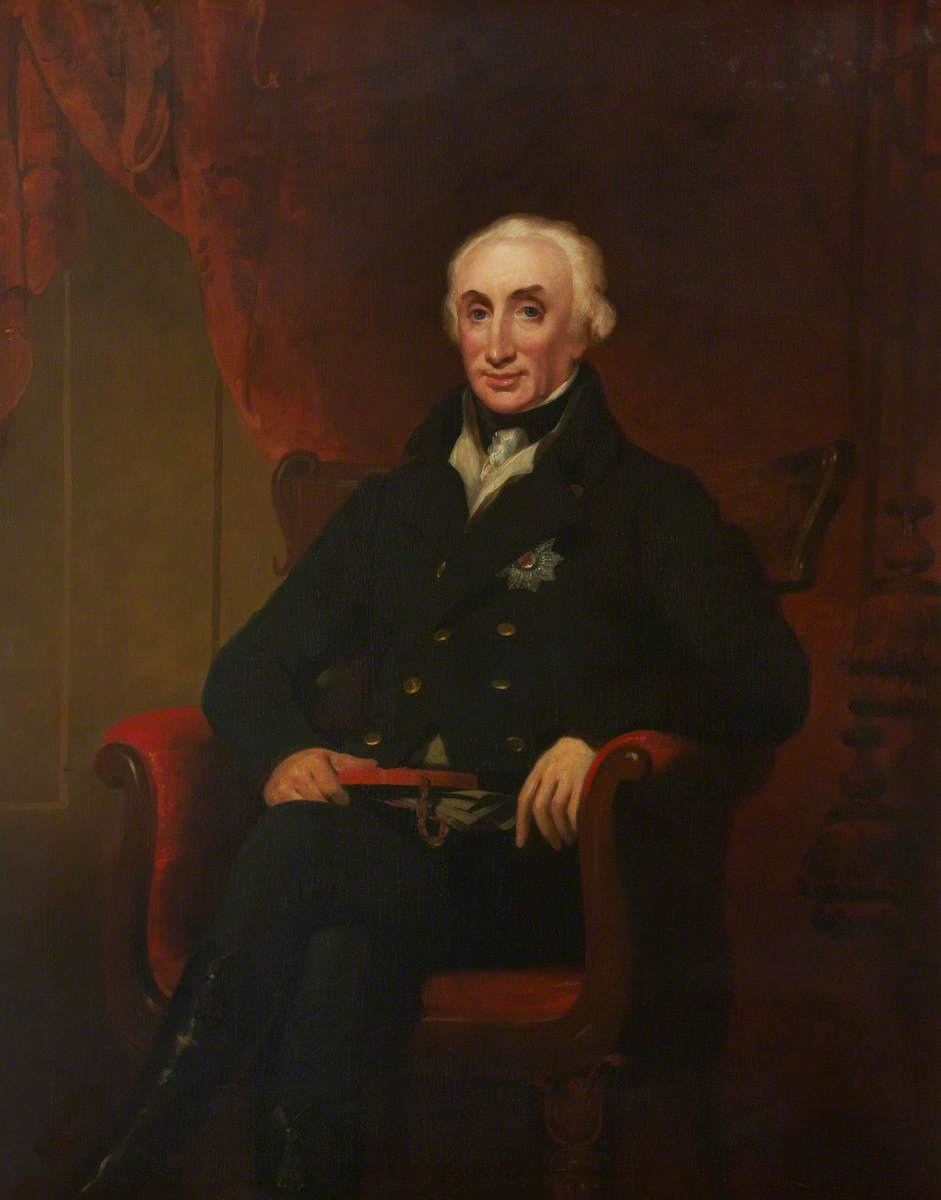
- The Duke of Buccleuch
- Born: 2 September 1746
- Died: 11 January 1812 (aged 65); Dalkeith Palace, Midlothian, Scotland
- Spouse: Lady Elizabeth Montagu (m. 1767)
- Children: Elizabeth Home, Countess of Home; George Scott, Earl of Dalkeith; Mary Stopford, Countess of Courtown; Charles Montagu-Scott, 4th Duke of Buccleuch; Caroline Douglas, Marchioness of Queensberry; Henry Montagu Scott, 2nd Baron Montagu of Boughton; Harriet Kerr, Marchioness of Lothian
- Parent(s): Francis Scott, Earl of Dalkeith; Lady Caroline Townshend

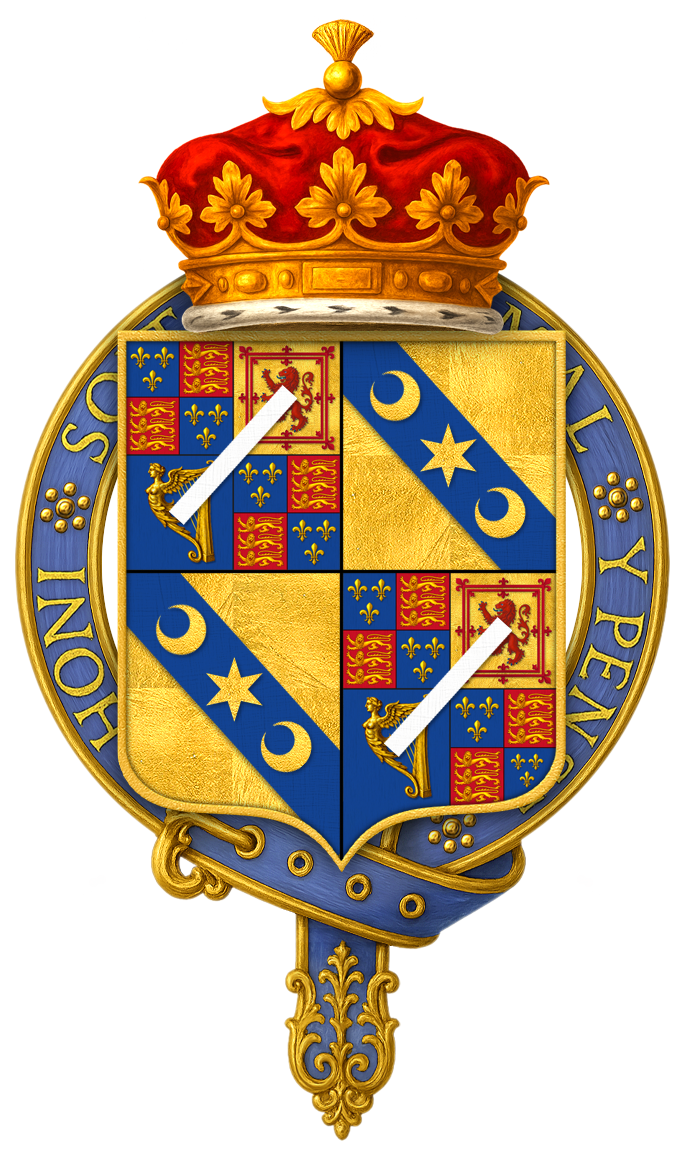
Quartered arms of Henry Scott, 3rd Duke of Buccleuch, KG, KT, FRSE

Colonel Henry Scott, 3rd Duke of Buccleuch and 5th Duke of Queensberry (2 September 1746 – 11 January 1812) was a British military officer and Duke. He was a long-time friend of Sir Walter Scott. Much of the family's lands and wealth were accumulated during Henry's tenure as duke. He integrated the surnames "Montagu" and "Douglas" with the Scott family name to form the unhyphenated compound surname "Montagu Douglas Scott".

== Early life ==
Henry Scott was the fourth of five children born to Francis Scott, Earl of Dalkeith (son of Francis Scott, 2nd Duke of Buccleuch), and his wife, Caroline Campbell, and the third-born and only surviving male heir. Through his father he was a direct male-line descendant of Charles II of England's illegitimate son, James Scott, 1st Duke of Monmouth. Henry was baptised on 29 September 1746 at St. George's Church, St George Street, Hanover Square, London, England. His father, Francis Scott, died of smallpox at the age of 29, just one year before the death of Henry's grandfather, the 2nd Duke of Buccleuch. Henry succeeded his grandfather as Duke of Buccleuch on 22 April 1751, at the age of four.

Educated at Eton College, through his stepfather Charles Townshend, Henry was given the opportunity to travel abroad with Adam Smith as his tutor from 1764 to 1766, and they remained friends.

In 1759, the young Duke was involved in a land dispute with the Burgh of Langholm in which the town won the rights of common over Kilngreen and Common Moss.

== Marriage and family ==
On 2 May 1767, he married Lady Elizabeth Montagu, the eldest daughter of Lady Mary Montagu and George (Brudenell) Montagu, 1st Duke of Montagu. The couple were married in Montagu House, Whitehall, London. Elizabeth's maternal and paternal grandparents were, respectively, Sir John Montagu, 2nd Duke of Montagu and Lady Mary Churchill, and George Brudenell, 3rd Earl of Cardigan and Lady Elizabeth Bruce. Two of her maternal great-grandparents were John Churchill, 1st Duke of Marlborough and Lady Sarah Jenyns (later Churchill).

Henry and Elizabeth had seven children together:

- George Scott, Earl of Dalkeith (25 March 1768 – 29 May 1768)
- Lady Mary Scott (21 May 1769 – 21 April 1823), married James Stopford, 3rd Earl of Courtown, and had issue.
- Lady Elizabeth Scott (10 October 1770 - 29 June 1837), married Alexander Home, 10th Earl of Home and had issue, including Cospatrick Douglas-Home, 11th Earl of Home.
- Sir Charles William Henry Montagu Scott, 4th Duke of Buccleuch & 6th Duke of Queensberry (24 May 1772 – 20 April 1819)
- Lady Caroline Scott (6 July 1774 – 29 April 1854), married Charles Douglas, 6th Marquess of Queensberry and had issue. They were the maternal grandparents of Arthur Johnstone-Douglas.
- Henry James Montagu Scott, 2nd Baron Montagu of Boughton (16 December 1776 – 30 October 1845)
- Lady Harriet Scott (1 December 1780 – 18 April 1833), married William Kerr, 6th Marquess of Lothian and had issue. They were the parents of Lord Mark Kerr; grandparents of Charles Hepburn-Stuart-Forbes-Trefusis, 20th Baron Clinton and Mark Rolle; great-grandparents of Mark Carpenter-Garnier, George Windsor-Clive, and Charles Hepburn-Stuart-Forbes-Trefusis, 21st Baron Clinton; and great-great grandparents of Thomas Coke, 5th Earl of Leicester and David Coke.

== The origin of the Montagu Douglas Scott surname ==
=== The Montagu line ===
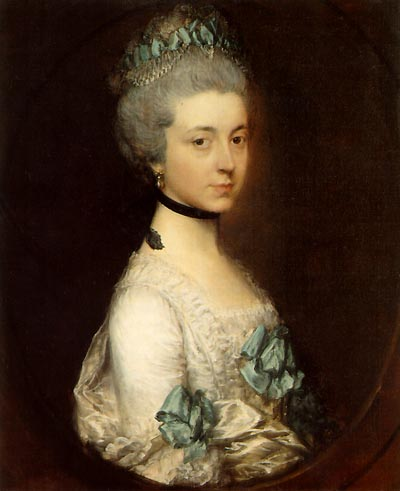
The Duchess of Buccleuch by Thomas Gainsborough, c. 1767.

When John Montagu, 2nd Duke of Montagu, died on 5 July 1749, his estate had been entailed to his daughter Mary, who was married to George Brudenell, 4th Earl of Cardigan. The Montagu peerages, like most English peerages, were limited to male heirs, and became extinct with Montagu's death. However, within ten days, Cardigan adopted the Montagu name and coat of arms for both himself and his two children, in order that the Montagu name should continue. Seventeen years later, in 1766, King George III created him Duke of Montagu and Marquess of Monthermer.

The first duke of the 1766 creation died on 23 May 1790—also survived only by a daughter, Elizabeth, by then Duchess of Buccleuch—and the Montagu peerages once again became extinct when Elizabeth inherited only the unentailed Montagu assets, which included Boughton House in Weekley, Northamptonshire. Like his father-in-law, Buccleuch wished to perpetuate the Montagu name, and adopted the unhyphenated surname Montagu Scott.

=== The Douglas line ===
William Douglas, 4th Duke of Queensberry never married; when he died on 23 December 1810, his peerages and entailments passed to his 2nd cousin once removed, Sir Henry Montagu Scott, 3rd Duke of Buccleuch, through Sir Henry's grandmother, Lady Jane Douglas, Queensberry's first cousin once removed. Buccleuch then added the surname to his own, forming the unhyphenated surname Montagu Douglas Scott which the family bears to this day.

== Career ==
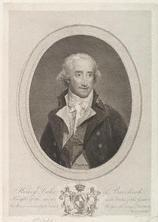
The Duke of Buccleuch by Philip Audinet, 1798.

Buccleuch was Governor of the Royal Bank of Scotland from 1777 to 1812. He was joint founder of the Royal Society of Edinburgh and its first President, serving from 1783 until his death in 1812. He was Lord Lieutenant of Midlothian and of Haddington from 1794 to 1812. He was also appointed a deputy lieutenant of Northamptonshire on 9 May 1803.

In 1778, when Britain was threatened with invasion by France and Spain during the American War of Independence, he raised a regiment of Fencibles at Dalkeith, the South Fencible Regiment or 'Southern regiment of Fencible Men' on 10 April and commanded it as Colonel until its disbandment on 1 April 1783. In the French Revolutionary Wars he raised and commanded a Volunteer unit, the 2nd Royal Edinburgh Volunteers, from 1797 until the Scottish Militia was authorised by Parliament in 1798. He was then instructed to raise the 10th North British Militia to which (as lord-lieutenant) he appointed himself colonel. He commanded the regiment and its successor the Edinburgh (County and City) Militia, and occasionally the Scottish Militia Brigade, until his resignation in 1811.

== Death ==
Buccleuch died at Dalkeith Palace, Midlothian, Scotland, on 11 January 1812, aged 65. He was buried in the family crypt of the Buccleuch Memorial Chapel in St. Mary's Episcopal Church, Dalkeith, Midlothian. The church is located on High Street in Dalkeith, at the entrance to Dalkeith Country Park.

Honorary titles
New title	Lord Lieutenant of Midlothian; 1794–1812	Succeeded by The Duke of Buccleuch
Preceded by The Duke of Roxburghe	Lord Lieutenant of Roxburghshire; 1804–1812	Succeeded by Earl of Ancram
Peerage of Scotland
Preceded by Francis Scott	Duke of Buccleuch; 2nd creation 1751–1812	Succeeded by Charles Montagu Scott
Preceded by William Douglas	Duke of Queensberry; 1810–1812	Succeeded by Charles Montagu Scott
Preceded by Francis Scott	Baron Scott of Tyndale (descended by acceleration); 1751–1807	Succeeded by Charles Montagu Scott
