= Alexander Montagu, 13th Duke of Manchester =

British hereditary peer and criminal (born 1962)

His Grace The Duke of Manchester

Personal details
- Born: Alexander Charles David Drogo Montagu; 11 December 1962 (age 63) Camperdown, New South Wales, Australia
- Spouses: Marion Stoner (m. 1984; div. 1996) Wendy Dawn Buford (m. 1993; div. 2006) Laura Ann Smith (m. 2007)
- Children: Alexander Montagu; Ashley Montagu
- Parent(s): The 12th Duke of Manchester; Mary Eveleen McClure

Alexander Charles David Drogo Montagu, 13th Duke of Manchester (born 11 December 1962), is an Australian-born British hereditary peer, inheriting the dukedom of Manchester from his father in 2002. He is a British and Australian citizen and has lived in the United States since 1986. He has been convicted of fraud, burglary, and other offences and has served several prison sentences in Australia and the United States. Between June 1985 and July 2002, he was styled as Viscount Mandeville.

== Biography ==
The 13th Duke is the son of the 12th Duke of Manchester and his first wife, newspaper columnist Mary Eveleen, daughter of Walter Gillespie McClure, of Geelong, Victoria, Australia.

In Australia in 1984, the then Alex Montagu married firstly Marion Stoner, an Australian model who was 11 years older than him. The relationship lasted two months; Stoner left after accusing Montagu of firing a speargun at her. In 1985, Montagu was sentenced to three years in prison after being convicted of 22 charges of fraud. In 1991, he was arrested again in Brisbane after he sold a car he had rented.

After emigrating to the United States in 1986, Viscount Mandeville, as he was now, married secondly in California in May 1993, to Wendy Dawn Buford, daughter of a construction salesman. They had a son, Alexander Michael Charles David Francis George Edward William Kimble Drogo Montagu (born 1993).

Then-Lord Mandeville did not obtain a divorce from his first wife until 1996, three years after his second marriage. Buford bore the then Lord Mandeville a second child, Ashley Faith Maxine Nell Montagu, in 1999. The Duke of Manchester, as he was styled from July 2002, and Buford separated after 15 years and were divorced in 2006.

Manchester then married a third time on 21 September 2007. His third wife was an American real estate agent named Laura Ann Smith, and the marriage was without issue. In 2009, the duke reportedly then revealed that his marriage to Buford in 1993 had been invalid, as he had still been married to his first wife in Australia. On these grounds, he stopped making child support payments and the family trust cut off funds to his children. Buford successfully sued on behalf of their two children. In 2011, High Court Justice Christopher Floyd ruled that the two children, even though they were born when their parents were not lawfully married, were entitled to trust funds, as "(Buford) reasonably believed the marriage was valid". Under the Legitimacy Act 1959, the children of void marriages can benefit from family trusts if, "at the time of the act of intercourse resulting in the birth" or at time of the wedding, either party "reasonably believed" that the marriage was indeed valid.

In 2013, the duke was charged again with fraud in Las Vegas for reportedly knowingly passing a $3,575 cheque in 2011 without "funds, property or credit" to back up the cheque. He pleaded no contest to the charge and received a 90-day suspended sentence and six months to repay the debt. After he failed to repay the debt and failed to appear in court, a bench warrant was issued for his arrest in June 2014. In 2016, Manchester was accused of burglary and making a false police report. He was sentenced to five years in prison in 2017, which he served in High Desert State Prison.

Peerage of Great Britain
Preceded by Angus Montagu	Duke of Manchester; 2002–present	Incumbent
