= Elizabeth Scott, Duchess of Buccleuch (1743–1827) =

Scottish noblewoman

Her Grace The Duchess of Buccleuch and Queensberry
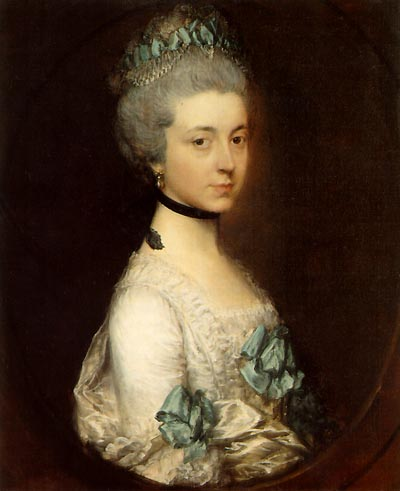
- Portrait by Thomas Gainsborough, c. 1767
- Born: Lady Elizabeth Montagu; 29 May 1743; Montagu House, Whitehall, London, England
- Died: 21 November 1827 (aged 84); Richmond, Surrey, England
- Spouse: Henry Scott, 3rd Duke of Buccleuch (m. 1767)
- Issue: Elizabeth Home, Countess of Home; George Scott, Earl of Dalkeith; Mary Stopford, Countess of Courtown; Charles Montagu-Scott, 4th Duke of Buccleuch; Henry James Montagu Scott, 2nd Baron Montagu of Boughton; Harriet Kerr, Marchioness of Lothian
- Parents: George Montagu, 1st Duke of Montagu; Lady Mary Montagu

Elizabeth Scott, Duchess of Buccleuch (29 May 1743 – 21 November 1827), formerly Lady Elizabeth Montagu, was the wife of Henry Scott, 3rd Duke of Buccleuch.

== Biography ==
Lady Elizabeth was the eldest daughter of George Montagu, 1st Duke of Montagu, and his wife, Mary. She was baptised at St George's, Hanover Square. Her maternal great-grandparents were John Churchill, 1st Duke of Marlborough and his wife Sarah. The death of her brother, John Montagu, Marquess of Monthermer, unmarried and without heirs, in 1770, resulted in the barony of Montagu passing to her children.

The couple were married on 2 May 1767, at Montagu House, Whitehall. They had seven children:

- Lady Elizabeth Scott (died 1837), who married Alexander Home, 10th Earl of Home, and had children
- George Scott, Earl of Dalkeith (1768–1768), who died in infancy
- Lady Mary Scott (1769–1823), who married James Stopford, 3rd Earl of Courtown and had children
- Sir Charles William Henry Montagu Scott, 4th Duke of Buccleuch & 6th Duke of Queensberry (1772–1819)
- Lady Caroline Scott (1774–1854), who married Charles Douglas, 6th Marquess of Queensberry, and had children
- Henry James Montagu Scott, 2nd Baron Montagu of Boughton (16 December 1776 – 30 October 1845)
- Lady Harriet Scott (1780–1833), who married William Kerr, 6th Marquess of Lothian and had children

Her Grace the Duchess of Buccleugh was a subscriber of the 1789 autobiography The Interesting Narrative of the Life of Olaudah Equiano

Her husband died in 1812 and her son became the Duke. He had the Duchess Bridge at Langholme rebuilt in iron the following year. The bridge was named for the Duchess of Buccleagh. In 2021 it was considered to be Scotland's oldest iron bridge.

The duchess died, aged 84, in Richmond, Surrey, and was buried at Warkton, Northamptonshire.

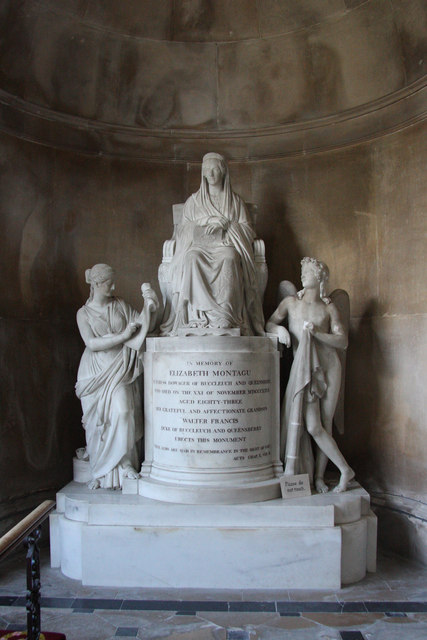
Memorial to the Duchess in St Edmund's church Warkton
