= John Montagu, 2nd Duke of Montagu =

British Army officer and courtier

Major-General His Grace The Duke of Montagu KG KB PC FRS
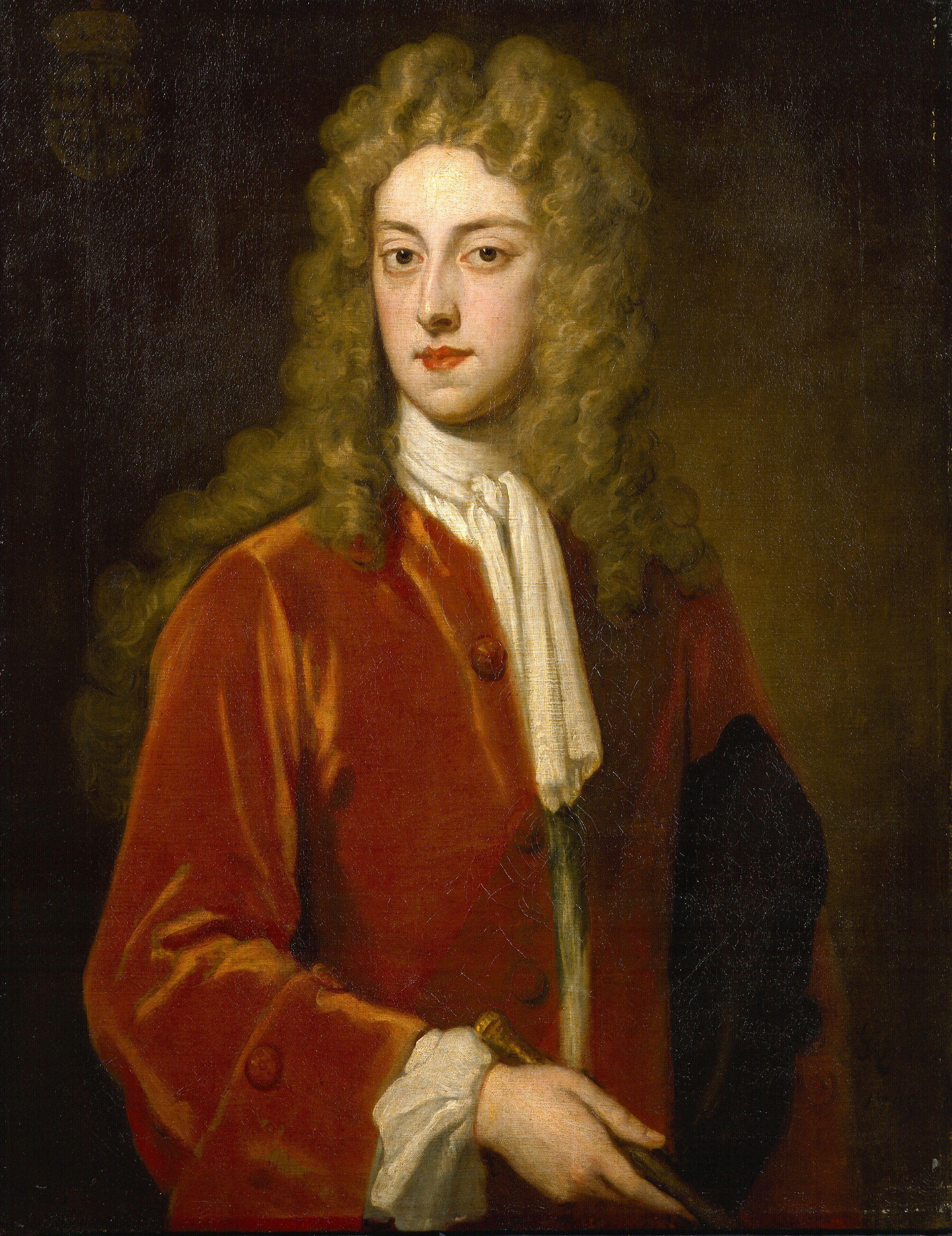
- Portrait by Sir Godfrey Kneller, 1709

Duke of Montagu
- Reign: 1709 – 5 July 1749
- Predecessor: Ralph Montagu, 1st Duke of Montagu
- Successor: Extinct
- Born: 1690
- Died: 5 July 1749
- Spouse: Lady Mary Churchill
- Issue among others...: Isabella Montagu, Duchess of Manchester; Mary Montagu, Countess of Cardigan
- Father: Ralph Montagu, 1st Duke of Montagu
- Mother: Elizabeth Wriothesley

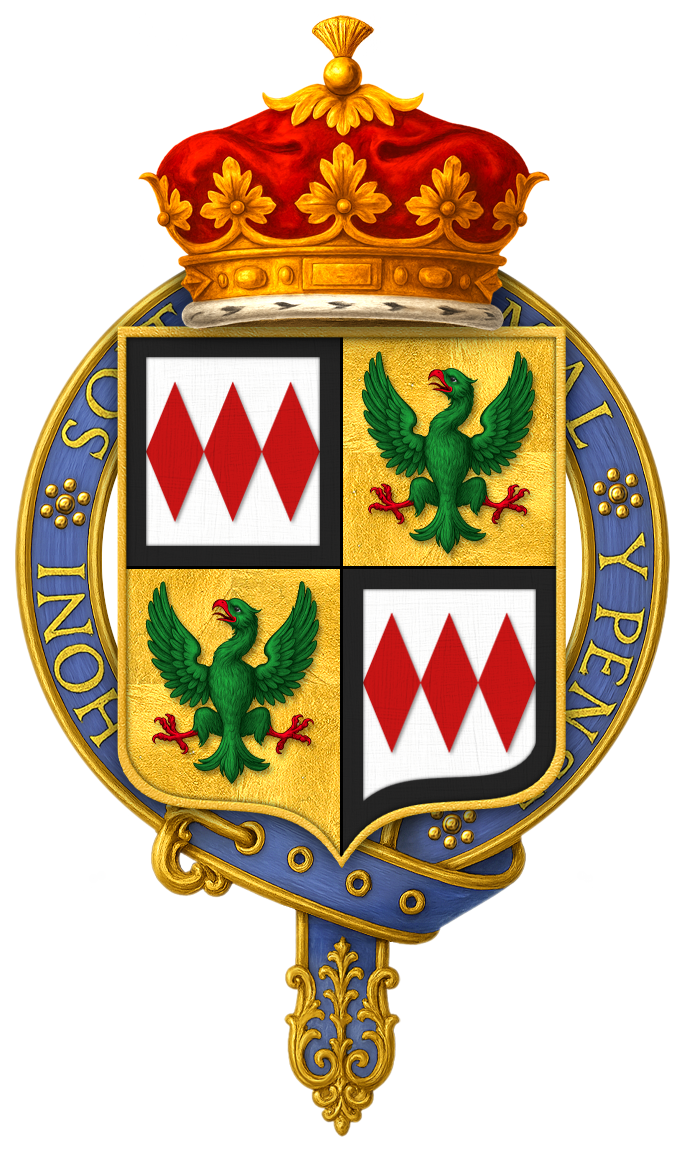
Montagu's coat of arms

Major-General John Montagu, 2nd Duke of Montagu, KG, GMB, PC, FRS (1690 – 5 July 1749), styled Viscount Monthermer until 1705 and Marquess of Monthermer between 1705 and 1709, was a British Army officer, courtier and the fifth Grand Master of the Premier Grand Lodge of Freemasonry.

== Life ==
Montagu was born in 1690. He received private tuition as a child and also went on a grand tour of Italy and France with Pierre Sylvestre in his formative years. When he was 15, on 17 March 1705, John was married to Lady Mary Churchill, daughter of John Churchill, 1st Duke of Marlborough, and Sarah Churchill, Duchess of Marlborough. His in-laws were among the wealthiest and most powerful families in Europe at the time. In 1709 he succeeded his father to the Dukedom of Montagu.

On 23 October 1717, Montagu was admitted a Fellow of the Royal College of Physicians. He was made a Knight of the Garter in 1719, and was made Order of the Bath, a Fellow of the Royal Society in 1725, and a Grand Master of the Premier Grand Lodge of England which was the first Masonic Grand Lodge to be created.

On 22 June 1722, George I appointed Montagu governor of the islands of Saint Lucia and Saint Vincent in the West Indies. He in turn appointed Nathaniel Uring, a merchant sea captain and adventurer, as deputy-governor. Uring went to the islands with a group of seven ships, and established settlement at Petit Carenage. Unable to get enough support from British warships, he and the new colonists were quickly run off by the French. In 1735, he was appointed a Major general in the British Army.

In 1739, the country's first home for abandoned children, the Foundling Hospital was created in London. Montagu was a supporter of this effort and was one of the charity's founding governors. He also financed the education of two notable Black British figures of the age, Ignatius Sancho (a butler at his Blackheath home, Montagu House) and Francis Williams, allegedly sending the latter to Cambridge University (the university has no record of his having studied there).

In 1740, Montagu was promoted to Master-General of the Ordnance and served in that position until 1742. In 1745, Montagu raised two regiments: a cavalry regiment known as Montagu's Carabineers and a Regiment of Foot known as Montagu's Ordnance Regiment. Both were, however, disbanded after the Battle of Culloden.

Montagu was a notorious practical joker, his mother-in-law writing of him that "All his talents lie in things only natural in boys of fifteen years old, and he is about two and fifty; to get people into his garden and wet them with squirts, and to invite people to his country houses and put things in beds to make them itch, and twenty such pretty fancies as these."

Montagu is said to have once dunked the political philosopher Montesquieu in a tub of cold water as a joke. Montagu also commissioned William Hogarth to portray Chief Justice John Willes unflatteringly in a number of cartoons series Before and After (Hogarth) in which lusty amoral rakes seduce women. The Bottle Conjuror was a famous hoax which was attributed to Montagu.

Montagu's country place, Boughton House, Northamptonshire, was laid out by him as a miniature Versailles, and now belonging to the Buccleuch family. He owned a library in the house, which included a copy of the 16th century Wriothesley Garter book.

After his death, his town residence, Montagu House, Bloomsbury, on the present site of the British Museum, received and for many years held the national collections, which under the name of the British Museum were first opened to the public in 1759.

Montagu was an owner of a coal mine.

== Children ==
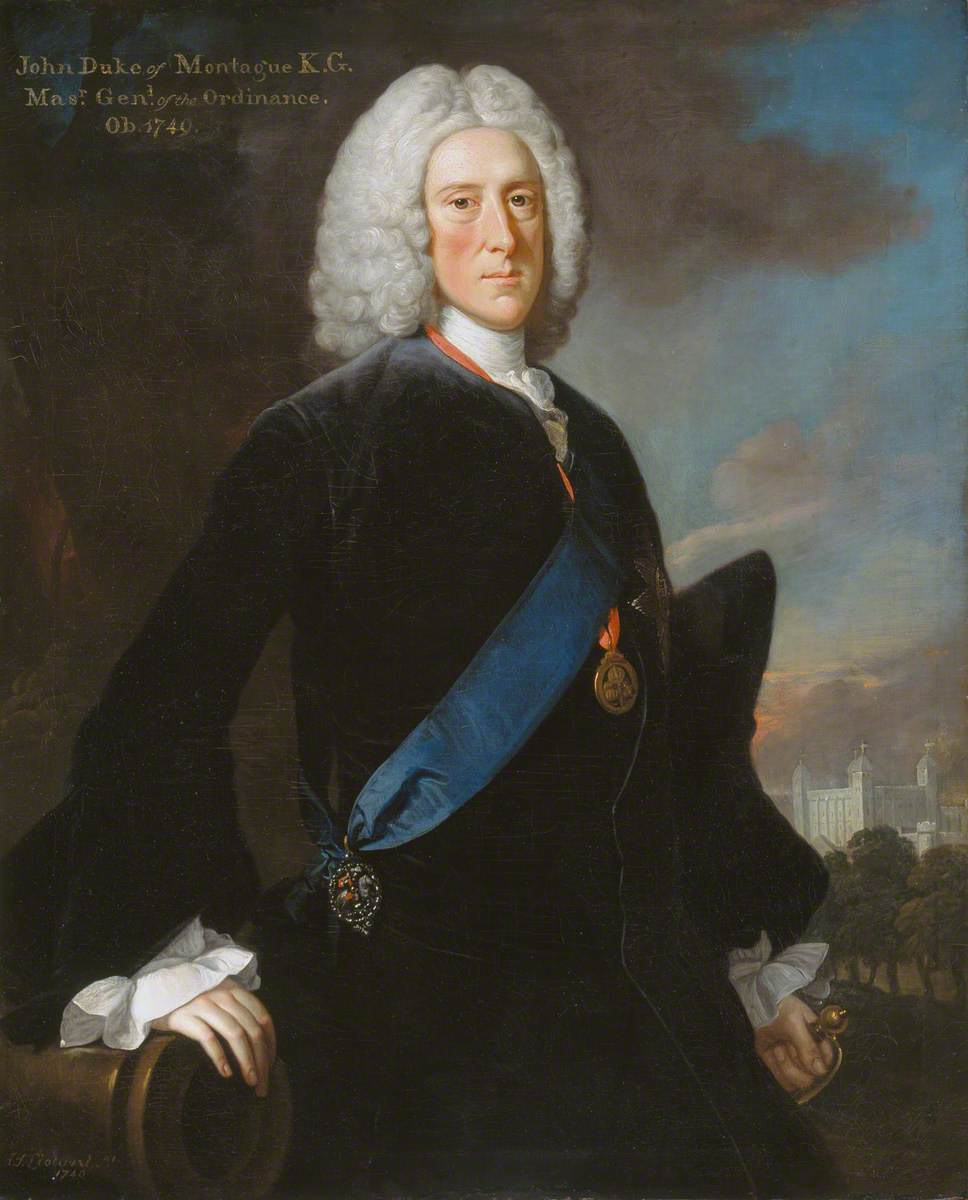
1740 portrat of Montagu by George Knapton

Montagu and his wife, Lady Mary Churchill, were parents to five children:

- Lady Isabella Montagu (c. 1706 – 20 December 1786). Married first William Montagu, 2nd Duke of Manchester in 1723 (no issue), and second Edward Hussey-Montagu, 1st Earl of Beaulieu (had issue).
- John (1706–1711)
- George (died in infancy)
- Lady Mary Montagu (c. 1711/1712 – 1 May 1775). Married George Brudenell, 4th Earl of Cardigan, later Duke of Montagu (had issue).
- Edward (27 December 1725 – May 1727)

== Succession ==
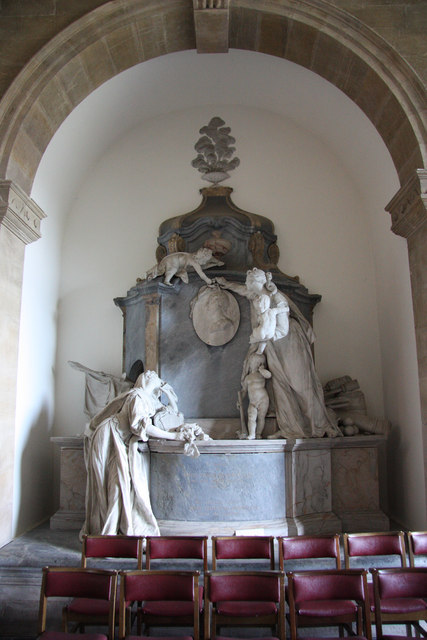
Monument to Montagu in St Edmund's church, Warkton

As none of Montagu's sons survived him, his titles became extinct upon his death in 1749. His estates were inherited by his daughter Mary, whose husband, George Brudenell, 4th Earl of Cardigan assumed the name and arms of Montagu, and in 1766 was created 1st Duke of Montagu (second creation). In 1790 this second creation dukedom of Montagu also became extinct; his only son (who had been created Baron Montagu of Boughton) having predeceased him. His daughter Elizabeth married Henry Scott, 3rd Duke of Buccleuch, 5th Duke of Queensberry who thus acquired all the unentailed property of the Dukes of Montagu.

== Notes ==
=== Attribution ===
- This article incorporates text from a publication now in the public domain: Chichester, Henry Manners (1894). "Montagu, John (1688?-1749)". In Lee, Sidney (ed.). Dictionary of National Biography. Vol. 38. London: Smith, Elder & Co.

== Bibliography ==
- Murdoch, Tessa (ed.), Noble Households: Eighteenth-Century Inventories of Great English Houses (Cambridge, John Adamson, 2006) ISBN 978-0-9524322-5-8 OCLC 78044620. For an inventory of the duke's goods and chattels at Montagu House, Bloomsbury, prior to his move to Whitehall in 1733, see pp. 27–48; for an inventory of his goods and chattels at Montagu House, Whitehall, in 1746, see pp. 87–116, for inventories of his goods and chattels at Boughton House, see pp. 62–70 (1718) and pp. 70–7 (1730).

Political offices
Preceded by The Earl of Burlington	Captain of the Gentlemen Pensioners; 1734–1740	Succeeded by The Duke of Bolton
Court offices
Preceded by The Duke of Montagu	Master of the Great Wardrobe; 1709–1749	Succeeded by Sir Thomas Robinson
Military offices
Preceded by The Lord Ashburnham	Captain and Colonel of His Majesty's Own Troop of Horse Guards; 1715–1721	Succeeded by Lord Herbert
Preceded by The Earl of Westmorland	Captain and Colonel of His Majesty's Own Troop of Horse Guards; 1737	Succeeded by The Lord De La Warr
Preceded by The 2nd Duke of Argyll	Master-General of the Ordnance; 1740–1742	Succeeded by The 2nd Duke of Argyll
Preceded by William Evans	Colonel of The Queen's Regiment of Dragoon Guards; 1740–1749	Succeeded by Sir John Ligonier
Preceded by The 2nd Duke of Argyll	Master-General of the Ordnance; 1742–1749	Vacant Title next held by The Duke of Marlborough
Masonic offices
Preceded by George Payne	Grand Master of the Premier; Grand Lodge of England; 1721–1723	Succeeded by The Duke of Wharton
Honorary titles
Preceded by The Earl of Peterborough	Lord Lieutenant of Northamptonshire; 1715–1749	Succeeded by The Earl of Halifax
Preceded by The Earl of Northampton	Lord Lieutenant of Warwickshire; 1715–1749	Succeeded by The Earl Brooke
New title	Great Master of the Order of the Bath; 1725–1749	Vacant Title next held by Prince Frederick, Duke of York and Albany
Preceded by The Earl of Macclesfield	Custos Rotulorum of Warwickshire; 1728–1749	Succeeded by The Earl Brooke
Preceded by The Earl of Westmorland	Custos Rotulorum of Northamptonshire; 1735–1749	Succeeded by The Earl of Halifax
Preceded by The Duke of Bolton	Governor of the Isle of Wight; 1733–1734	Succeeded by John Wallop, 1st Earl of Portsmouth
Peerage of England
Preceded by Ralph Montagu	Duke of Montagu; 1st creation 1709–1749	Extinct
