= Mary Montagu, Duchess of Montagu (1711–1775) =

Wife of George Brudenell Montagu, Duke of Montagu

Her Grace The Duchess of Montagu
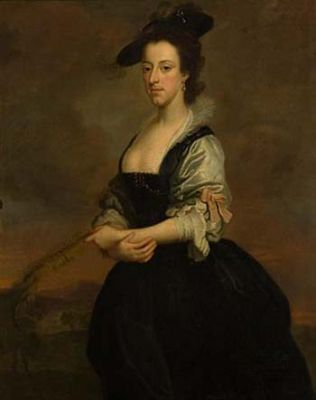
- Mary Montagu, Duchess of Montagu painted by Francis Cotes in 1769
- Born: Lady Mary Montagu c. 1711/1712; London, England
- Died: 2 May 1775 (aged 63–64); Warkton, Northamptonshire, England
- Spouse: George Brudenell Montagu, 1st Duke of Montagu and 4th Earl of Cardigan (m. 1730)
- Issue: John Montagu, Marquess of Monthermer; Elizabeth Montagu, Duchess of Buccleuch
- Parents: John Montagu, 2nd Duke of Montagu; Lady Mary Churchill

Mary Montagu, Duchess of Montagu (c.1711/1712 – 2 May 1775), known as Countess of Cardigan between 1730 and 1749, was the wife of George Brudenell, 4th Earl of Cardigan. She was the daughter of John Montagu, 2nd Duke of Montagu, on whose death in 1749 her husband inherited the family estates and took the surname "Montagu". Her mother was Lady Mary Churchill, daughter of John Churchill, 1st Duke of Marlborough. In 1766, her husband the earl was made a duke, reviving the titles that had become extinct as a result of his father-in-law's death without a male heir.

Lady Mary married the earl on 7 July 1730 at St Giles-in-the-Fields. They had two children:

- John Montagu, Marquess of Monthermer and 1st Baron Montagu of Boughton (18 March 1735–11 April 1770)
- Lady Elizabeth Montagu (29 May 1743 – 21 November 1827), who married Henry Scott, 3rd Duke of Buccleuch, and had children.

Other children died in infancy.

The duchess died at the age of about 63, and was buried at St Edmund's Church, Warkton, Northamptonshire. Her memorial was sculpted by Peter Mathias van Gelder to a design by Robert Adam, and was completed in 1781.
