= Lady Mary Faith Montagu =

British aristocrat (1911–1983)

Lady Mary Faith Culme-Seymour
- Born: 1 November 1911
- Died: 16 February 1983 (aged 71)
- Spouses: Philip Booth Nesbitt (m. 1938, divorced) Sir Michael Culme-Seymour, 5th Baronet (m. 1948)
- Children: 3
- Parents: George Montagu, 9th Earl of Sandwich (father); Alberta Sturges (mother)
- Relatives: Victor Montagu (brother); Lady Elizabeth Montagu (sister); Josephine MacLeod (grandaunt)

Lady Mary Faith Culme-Seymour, Lady Culme-Seymour (née Montagu, previously Nesbitt; 1 November 1911 – 16 February 1983) was a British aristocrat and letter writer. The daughter of the 9th Earl of Sandwich and American heiress Alberta Sturges, she grew up at the family's ancestral seat, Hinchingbrooke House in Huntingdon. When her brother, Victor Montagu, 10th Earl of Sandwich, sold the family home in 1955, Lady Faith took her close friend, the novelist E. M. Forster, to see it one last time. Her last tour of the home with Forster was an emotional one, and she documented the experience in her diary and in letters. She and Forster, who initially offered her advice on short story writing, remained friends until his death.

Through her second marriage, to Sir Michael Culme-Seymour, 5th Baronet, Lady Faith was the châtelaine of Rockingham Castle in Northamptonshire, where she oversaw the renovation and redecoration of the house.

== Early life and family ==
Mary Faith Montagu was born on 1 November 1911 to George Montagu, a Conservative politician and former Member of Parliament, and his American wife, the heiress Alberta Sturges. The third of four children, she was a younger sister of Victor Montagu and William Drogo Sturges Montagu and an older sister of Elizabeth Montagu. Her paternal grandfather, Rear Admiral The Honourable Victor Montagu, was an officer in the Royal Navy, a godson of Queen Victoria, and the younger son of John Montagu, 7th Earl of Sandwich. On her mother's side, Lady Faith was a grandniece of the American spiritualist Josephine MacLeod and a descendant of U.S. Congressman and judge Jonathan Sturges. Her mother, who was American, was of Scottish and English descent. At the time of her birth, her uncle Edward was the Earl of Sandwich. In 1916, her father succeeded his brother as the 9th Earl of Sandwich and moved the family into Hinchingbrooke House, the Montagu family's ancestral seat. At the time of her father's elevation to the peerage, she became entitled to the courtesy title The Lady Mary Faith Montagu as the daughter of an earl.

In 1925, when she was fourteen years old, she crossed the Atlantic on the liner Minnekahda with her grandmother Betty Leggett and two cousins. When they arrived in New York, she was delayed by US immigration inspectors who wanted to send her to Ellis Island to be deported.

== Adult life ==
At the beginning of World War II, Lady Faith fell in love with an American airman. In 1938, Lady Faith married an American, Philip Booth Nesbitt, and had a daughter, Caroline Gemma Nesbitt. The family lived in California. She and Nesbitt later divorced.

She returned to England and married, a second time, to Sir Michael Culme-Seymour, 5th Baronet of High Mount and Friery Park, on 18 March 1948. They had two children together: Micael Culme-Seymour and Francis Michael Culme-Seymour. Both of their sons died in infancy. Sir Michael adopted Lady Faith's daughter from her first marriage. Lady Faith was Rhesus Negative, a condition which made it difficult for her to have children.

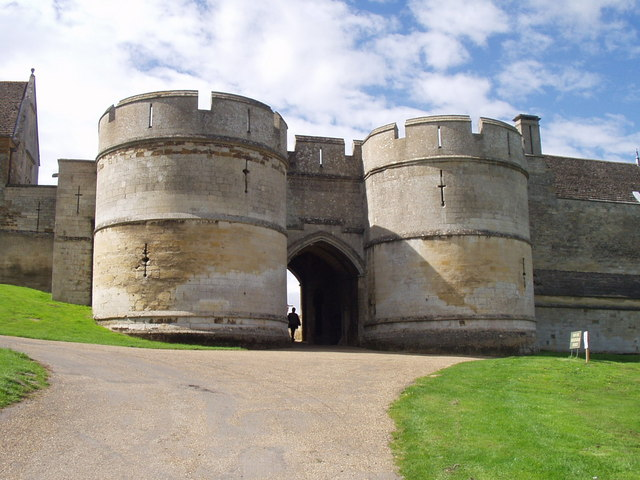
The entrance to Rockingham Castle

Upon her marriage, she moved into Rockingham Castle, a 5,000-acre estate that her husband inherited in 1925 from his grandmother, Mary Georgiana Watson. As châtelaine of Rockingham Castle, Lady Faith oversaw renovations and redecorating the rooms, closing the old kitchen, and creating a private flat for the family within the castle. In 1967, her husband passed the estate on to his nephew and heir, Commander Michael Saunders, and the family moved to a cottage in Dorset.

Like her mother and grandmother, Betty Leggett, Lady Faith and her second husband were attracted to the religious traditions and philosophies of India.

Lady Faith was a close friend of the novelist E. M. Forster, whom she was introduced to by her father. Throughout her life they communicated often, sending over seventy letters to each other. Their friendship began when she wrote to him for a critique on a short story she was working on. He often came to stay with the family at Rockingham during Christmas. Her brother, who became the 10th Earl of Sandwich, inherited Hinchingbrooke House, which had been used as a hospital during World War II. She wrote in a letter about her brother's decision to sell the family home in 1955, and after it was boarded up, took Forster there to see it, as had spent some of his youth there with her father. In her letter and diary, she writes about the heartbreak of the family losing their ancestral home.

She died on 16 February 1983.
