= Lady Elizabeth Montagu =

British writer (1917–2006)

- Born: 4 July 1917 London, England
- Died: 10 January 2006 (aged 88) London, England
- Occupation: Novelist; magazine writer; nurse; art collector
- Education: North Foreland Lodge
- Period: 1953–1966
- Genre: Narrative fiction
- Parents: George Montagu, 9th Earl of Sandwich (father); Alberta Sturges (mother)
- Relatives: Victor Montagu (brother); Lady Mary Faith Montagu (sister); Josephine MacLeod (grandaunt)

Lady Elizabeth Montagu (4 July 1917 – 10 January 2006), known as Betty Montagu, was a British novelist, nurse, and art collector. The daughter of the 9th Earl of Sandwich and American heiress Alberta Sturges, she grew up at Hinchingbrooke House in Huntingdon and was educated at North Foreland Lodge. When war broke out in Europe, she began work as a nurse, eventually heading the casualties department at St Thomas' Hospital in London. After the war ended, she served on the teaching staff at the Royal College of Nursing until 1950.

In the 1950s and 1960s, Lady Elizabeth was a celebrated novelist. She published three novels through Heinemann, Waiting for Camilla in 1953, The Small Corner in 1955, and This Side of the Truth in 1947. In 1958 she published an English translation of Carl Zuckmayer's 1955 drama Das kalte Licht. Lady Elizabeth also wrote contributing pieces for various British magazines, including Encounter. After her collection of short stories Change, and Other Stories, was published in 1966, she stopped writing professionally. Her work was praised by Sir John Betjeman, John Davenport and Graham Greene, and she received glowing reviews in The Times Literary Supplement and the New Statesman.

Lady Elizabeth was an art collector, along with maintaining a art collection she inherited from her father, she collected works by Graham Sutherland, Sir Sidney Nolan, Frank Auerbach and Michael Andrews. She also painted country scenes and made (often humorous) sketches of her friends.

== Early life and family ==
Lady Elizabeth Montagu was born on 4 July 1917 in London, the youngest child of George Montagu, 9th Earl of Sandwich and Alberta Montagu, Countess of Sandwich. She was a younger sister of Victor Montagu, 10th Earl of Sandwich, The Honourable William Drogo Sturges Montagu, and Lady Mary Faith Montagu. Her paternal grandfather, Rear Admiral The Honourable Victor Montagu, was an officer in the Royal Navy and a godson of Queen Victoria. Her paternal great-grandfather was Charles Yorke, 4th Earl of Hardwicke. On her mother's side, Lady Elizabeth was the granddaughter of Betty Leggett and a descendent of the American judge Jonathan Sturges. She was a grandniece of Josephine MacLeod, who, like her mother and grandmother, was a devotee of the Hindu monk and philosopher Swami Vivekananda.

Lady Elizabeth grew up at Hinchingbrooke House, the family's ancestral seat in Huntingdon. She was educated at North Foreland Lodge, a boarding school for girls in North Foreland, and went on to study German language in Munich. She was presented as a debutante in the 1930s and was briefly a model for Pond's cold cream advertisements.

== Career ==
=== Nursing ===
During World War II, Lady Elizabeth trained as a registered nurse at St Thomas' Hospital 1941-1944, where she was head of casualties. Lady Elizabeth worked at St. Thomas' Hospital until 1946, and was on the teaching staff of the Royal College of Nursing from 1947 to 1950.

=== Writing ===
She was an acclaimed novelist; her novels included Waiting for Camilla in 1953, The Small Corner in 1955, and This Side of the Truth in 1957. In 1966 she published her volume of ten short stories Change, and Other Stories. Her novels were all published by Heinemann. The English poet Sir John Betjeman called her novel The Small Corner a "clever and subtle novel". English critic and book reviewer John Davenport called the novel "strangely compelling... a study of a woman who is self-righteous to the point of mania." The writer Graham Greene said Lady Elizabeth "does a very difficult thing, triumphantly" in her writing of This Side of the Truth and that she "writes with cool detachment, pinning down futility with the point of an acid pen" in Waiting for Camilla. As well as a novelist, Lady Elizabeth was a contributor to various magazines including Encounter. In 1958 she translated Carl Zuckmayer's 1955 drama Das kalte Licht (The Cold Night) from German to English. Her works were praised by The Times Literary Supplement and the New Statesman. She would write while staying in a cottage in Dorset next to an apple orchard.

== Personal life ==
Lady Elizabeth was an art collector, collecting works by Graham Sutherland, Sir Sidney Nolan, Frank Auerbach, and Michael Andrews. She inherited a collection of paintings and other art objects from her father's collection. As an amateur artist, she painted country scenery and made humorous sketches of her friends.

"She described herself as a socialist and as an agnostic, but remained politically neutral if not conservative in practice." She never married, and built a house in the South of France with her friend Anne Balfour-Fraser. An alcoholic, she went to live with the shipping heiress Charlie Delmas in Mougins while she recovered.

Lady Elizabeth owned a flat in Battersea, where she spent the last years of her life. She died in London on 10 January 2006.
