= Alberta Montagu, Countess of Sandwich =

American heiress and British aristocrat (1877–1951)

The Right Honourable The Countess of Sandwich
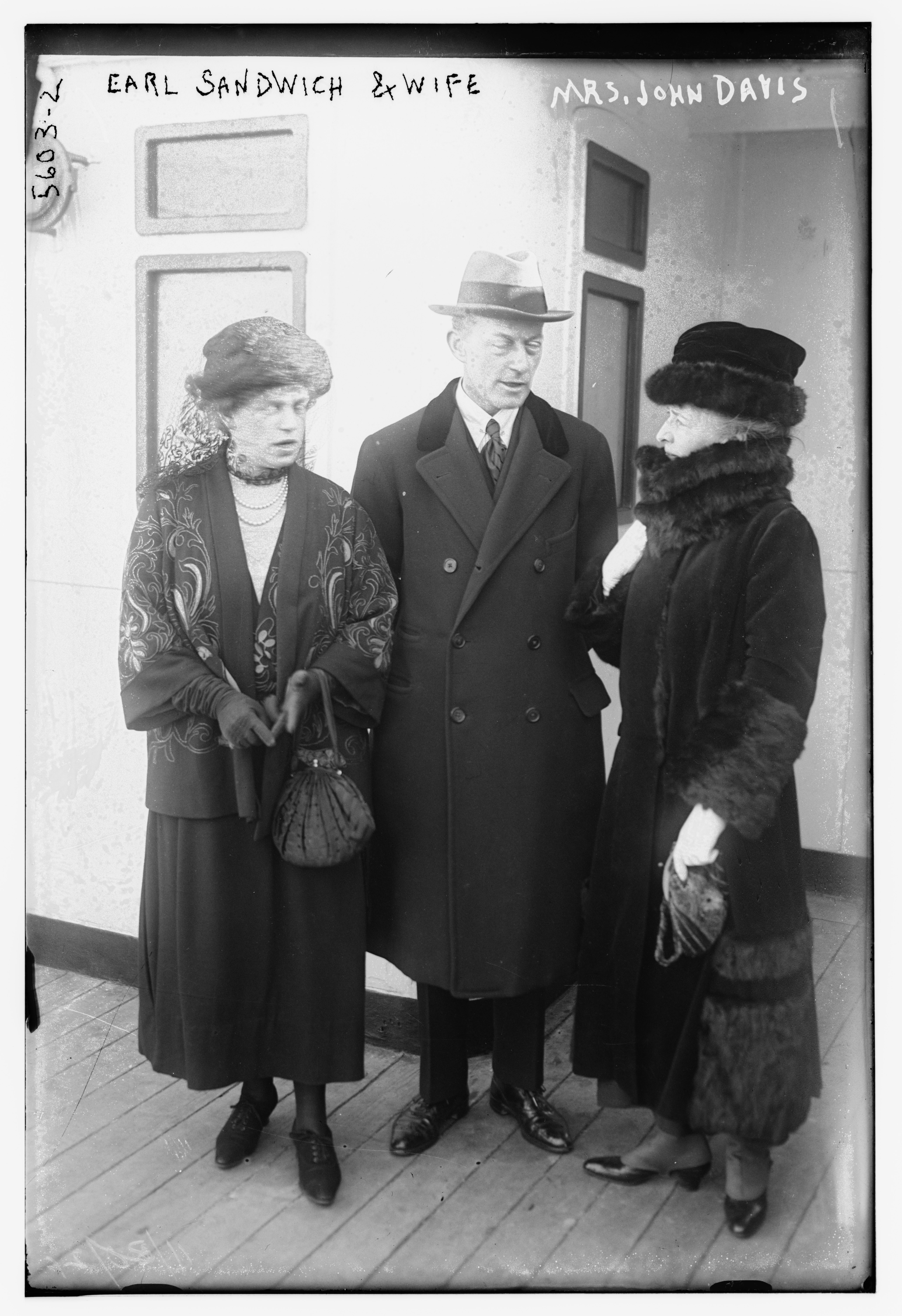
- Lady Sandwich (left) with her husband and Mrs John Davis in 1921

Personal details
- Born: Alberta Sturges; September 17, 1877 Chicago, Illinois, United States
- Died: October 23, 1951 (aged 74) Huntingdon, Huntingdonshire, England
- Spouse: George Montagu, 9th Earl of Sandwich (m. 1905)
- Children: Victor Montagu, 10th Earl of Sandwich; William Drogo Sturges Montagu; Lady Mary Faith Culme-Seymour; Lady Elizabeth Montagu
- Parents: William Sturges; Betty MacLeod

Alberta Montagu, Countess of Sandwich (née Sturges; September 17, 1877 – October 23, 1951) was an American heiress, diarist, and letter writer who was the wife of George Montagu, 9th Earl of Sandwich. Like many Gilded Age debutantes from the United States, she married into the British aristocracy and took on the running of her husband's family's ancestral seat, Hinchingbrooke House. Lady Sandwich was a close friend of Mildred Barnes Bliss and was an accomplished musician, writer, and linguist. She was a friend and devotee of the Hindu monk and philosopher Swami Vivekananda, whom she had met in her childhood when he stayed at her family's New York estate. Lady Sandwich hosted Vivekananda in Chicago, New York, and Paris, accompanied him on a trip to Rome, and corresponded with him throughout her life.

== Early life and family ==
Alberta Sturges was born in Chicago on September 7, 1877, to Betty MacLeod, of New York City, and William Sturges, of Chicago. Her maternal grandfather was a Scottish immigrant who lived in the American southeast, where he owned slaves; slavery being a common practice amongst the elite of this Antebellum South. Her paternal grandfather, of English descent, made a fortune through trade in Ohio. Through her father, she was a descendant of the Connecticut judge Jonathan Sturges and related to businessman Jonathan Sturges, art collector Kate Sturges Buckingham, and U.S. Congressman Lewis B. Sturges.

She was christened in New York, where the family lived at 21 West 34th Street. In 1880 she went with her family to Paris. In 1886, her father survived the sinking of the SS Oregon as it was sailing from Liverpool to New York, but died a few years later. After her father died, her mother remarried to New York wholesale grocer Francis H. Leggett in a small ceremony in Paris.

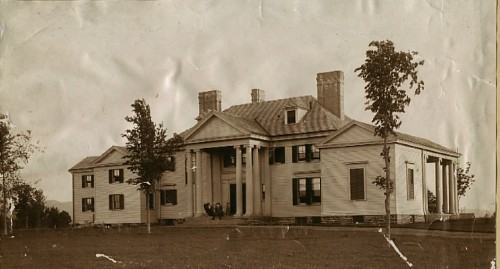
Ridgely Manor, where Lady Sandwich lived after her mother's second marriage.

In 1890, her stepfather built a large mansion and estate, called Ridgely Manor, in Stone Ridge, New York. Her aunt, Josephine MacLeod, and stepfather were friends of the Hindu monk and philosopher Swami Vivekananda, and her stepfather later served as the first president of the Vedanta Society of New York. Alberta Sturges and her mother soon became friends and disciples of Vivekananda, and built a five-bedroom cottage for Hindu monks, called Swamiji's Cottage, on the grounds of their estate. She and her mother often visited the monks at Swamiji's Cottage and hosted Vivekananda three times, the last time for ten weeks.

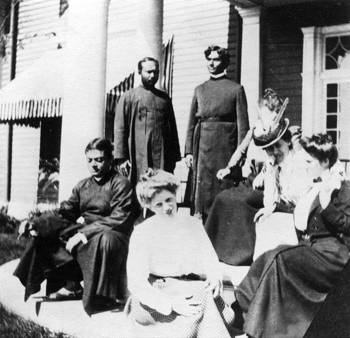
Alberta (center) with Swami Vivekananda, her mother, and her aunt at Ridgely

In 1895 she and her brother, Hollister, attended boarding school in Germany. While studying in Germany, Sturges and Vivekananda wrote letters to each other. She later accompanied him on a trip to Rome and to the Vatican City, and visited him in India. On her twenty-third birthday, Vivekananda penned a poem to her. She and members of her family also hosted Vivekananda in Chicago and in Paris.

Sturges was close friends with Mildred Barnes Bliss of Dumbarton Oaks, and the two were accomplished musicians and fluent in several languages. She was also fond of bookbinding and was an accomplished writer, penning letters to relatives and keeping diaries throughout her life.

Leggett later relocated the family to London, where he was pursuing social and business endeavors. As a member of a wealthy family during the Gilded Age, Sturges was presented as a debutante during the London Season of 1901. Despite a "splashy" debut, she was uninterested in society.

== Married life ==
On July 25, 1905, she married George Montagu, a Conservative Member of Parliament and son of Rear Admiral The Honourable Victor Montagu and Lady Agneta Harriet Yorke, in an Anglican ceremony at St Paul's Church, Knightsbridge. At the wedding, she wore the Montagu family tiara. She wore the tiara again for the Coronation of George V and Mary in 1911.

Lady Sandwich and her husband honeymooned in Venice for a month before sailing to the United States to stay at Ridgely Manor in September 1905.

The Montagus had four children:

- Alexander Victor Edward Paulet Montagu (22 May 1906 – 25 February 1995); succeeded as the 10th Earl of Sandwich before disclaiming the title two years later in order to sit in the House of Commons. He was succeeded in the title by his son, John.
- The Hon. William Drogo Sturges Montagu (29 May 1908 – 26 January 1940); married the Hon. Janet Gladys Aitken (1908–1988), former wife of Captain Ian Campbell (later 11th Duke of Argyll). He died during World War II.
- Lady Mary Faith Montagu (1 November 1911 – 16 February 1983)
- Lady Elizabeth Montagu (4 July 1917 – 10 January 2006)

Her husband succeeded his uncle, Edward Montagu, 8th Earl of Sandwich, as the 9th Earl of Sandwich in 1916, at which time they moved into Hinchingbrooke House. Upon her husband's elevation to the peerage, she assumed the style and title The Right Honourable The Countess of Sandwich. Her official portrait as countess was painted by Ambrose McEvoy. Not used to the scandals of British society, Lady Sandwich, who was described as being "a little on the pure-minded side", took to bed as an invalid for fourteen years, leaving the raising of children to her husband and a nurse. After she recovered, she sailed back and forth between the United States and England aboard RMS Queen Mary with her children.

In 1920, she and her mother visited Flanders. She wrote extensively about the damage the region suffered from during World War I.

Lady Sandwich died on October 23, 1951, in Huntingdon, Huntingdonshire.

== Arms ==
Coat of arms of The Countess of Sandwich
Notes Coat of Arms of Alberta, Countess of Sandwich Years in use June 1916 - October 1951 Coronet Coronet of a British Countess Escutcheon Quartered Arms of the Earls of Sandwich and the Sturges Family Symbolism The three Lozenges represent the Montagu Family. The crosses represent christianity. Previous versions Arms before her Husband became Earl of Sandwich. Made by S. Dyke in 1907.

== Legacy ==
An extensive collection of Lady Sandwich's letters and diaries are housed at Mapperton House.
