= Betty Leggett =

American devotee of Swami Vivekananda (1857–1931)

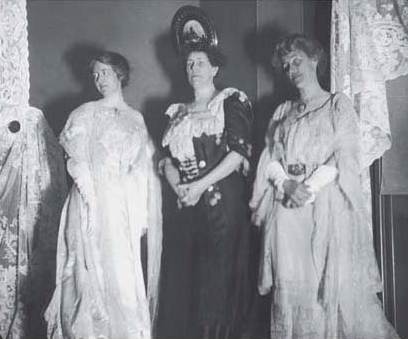
- Leggett (center) with Olea Bull (left) and Josephine MacLeod at a dinner for the King and Queen of Norway in 1906
- Born: Elizabeth MacLeod; January 24, 1857; Cincinnati, Ohio, U.S.
- Died: October 1, 1931 (aged 74); Stratford-upon-Avon, Warwickshire, U.K.
- Resting place: Sleepy Hollow Cemetery
- Occupation: Religious activist
- Spouses: William Sturges (m. 1876; died 1894) Francis Howard Leggett (m. 1895; died 1909)
- Children: 3 (including Alberta Montagu, Countess of Sandwich)
- Relatives: Josephine MacLeod (sister); Victor Montagu, 10th Earl of Sandwich (grandson); Lady Mary Faith Montagu (granddaughter); Lady Elizabeth Montagu (granddaughter)

Elizabeth MacLeod Sturges Leggett (January 24, 1857 – October 1, 1931), also known as Bessie Leggett or Betty Leggett, was an American socialite, letter writer, and disciple of the Hindu monk and philosopher Swami Vivekananda.

== Early life and family ==
Elizabeth MacLeod was born in Cincinnati on January 24, 1857, to John David MacLeod and Mary Ann Lennon. She was descended from Scottish settlers who were planters and enslavers in the American Southeast. Her father made a fortune through trade in Ohio. She was a sister of the spiritual writer Josephine MacLeod.

== Married life ==
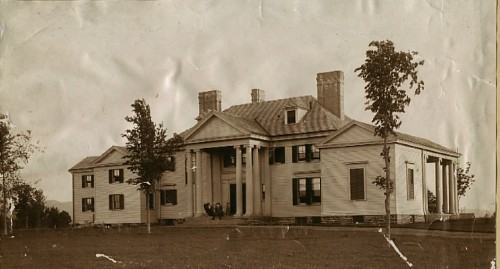
Ridgely Manor, the Leggett family estate in New York

On October 8, 1876, she married William Sturges, a widowed businessman from Chicago who was descended from the colonial politician Jonathan Sturges. They had a son, Hollister, and a daughter, Alberta. The family lived at 21 West 34th Street in Manhattan and travelled to Europe, where they kept apartments in Paris and London. Her husband died in 1894, a few years after surviving the sinking of the SS Oregon.

In 1895, she began attending classes in New York City that were being taught by the Hindu monk and philosopher Swami Vivekananda. During this time, she began dating Francis Howard Leggett, a wealthy New York wholesale grocer from a family with colonial New York roots, and he began attending the classes with her. They, along with her sister Josephine, became life-long devotees of Vivekananda and students of Neo-Vedanta. She maintained a close friendship with Vivekananda, writing to him and travelling with him abroad.

On September 9, 1895, she and Leggett married in a small ceremony in Paris that was attended by Vivekananda. She and her second husband had one daughter, Frances Howard Leggett. The family split their time between their Manhattan residence at 21 West 34th Street and Ridgely Manor, Leggett's large estate in Stone Ridge, New York. She spent part of each year in Europe, where she maintained a house on Bruton Street in London and an apartment in Paris, throwing lavish parties. She spent much of her time in London, and had her daughters debuted there.

Leggett and her husband built a five-bedroom cottage for Hindu monks, called Swamiji's Cottage, on the grounds of their New York estate. She and her children often visited the monks at Swamiji's Cottage and hosted Vivekananda three times, the last time for ten weeks. She and members of her family also hosted Vivekananda in Chicago and in Paris.

On July 23, 1906, Leggett and her sister attended a dinner at the Holdts Hotel in Bergen for King Haakon VII and Queen Maud of Norway.

In 1920, she and Alberta visited Flanders, and wrote of the damage from the aftermath of World War I.

Through her daughter, Alberta, Leggett was the grandmother of Victor Montagu, 10th Earl of Sandwich, Lady Mary Faith Montagu, and Lady Elizabeth Montagu. Through her daughter, Frances, she was the grandmother of Francis Vere Hampden Margesson, 2nd Viscount Margesson.

As a member of a prominent family, both by birth and by marriage, she was included in the Social Register.

Leggett died in Stratford-upon-Avon on October 1, 1931. She is buried in Sleepy Hollow Cemetery in New York.
