= Victor Montagu (Royal Navy officer) =

Royal Navy rear-admiral (1841–1915)

Rear-Admiral The Honourable Victor Montagu CB
- Montagu pictured in 1898
- Born: Victor Alexander Montagu; 20 April 1841; Westminster, London, England
- Died: 30 January 1915 (aged 73); Brompton, London, England
- Spouse: Lady Agneta Harriet Montagu
- Children: George Montagu, 9th Earl of Sandwich
- Military career
- Allegiance: United Kingdom
- Branch: Royal Navy
- Service years: 1853–1884
- Rank: Rear-Admiral
- Commands: HMS Garnet
- Conflicts: Crimean War; Second Opium War; Indian Rebellion of 1857
- Awards: Companion of the Order of the Bath; Order of the Medjidie (Ottoman Empire)
- Cricket career

Cricket information

Domestic team information
- Years: Team
- 1868–1869: Marylebone Cricket Club

Career statistics
Competition	First-class
Matches	2
Runs scored	4
Batting average	1.33
100s/50s	0/0
Top score	3
Catches/stumpings	0/–
- Source: CricInfo, 4 August 2025

Rear-Admiral Victor Alexander Montagu CB (20 April 1841 – 30 January 1915) was an English first-class cricketer and Royal Navy officer. Born to John Montagu, 7th Earl of Sandwich, he was a godson of Queen Victoria. Montagu entered the Royal Navy as a cadet at the age of 11. He served in the Crimean War (1832–56), seeing action in the Baltic campaign and in the Black Sea. Montagu survived the shipwreck of HMS Raleigh in 1857 and afterwards served with the Naval Brigade of HMS Pearl in the Indian Mutiny, being commended by parliament for his actions. As a captain, Montagu commanded the corvette HMS Garnet from 1882. He was involved in an incident in Grenada where he threatened the editor of the Grenada People and, after being criticised in the House of Commons, retired in 1885. He was promoted to rear admiral following retirement.

Montagu was a member of the Royal Yacht Squadron and built several boats. He designed the Montagu whaler in 1890, which was the standard seaboat of the Royal Navy for 60 years. As a cricketer Montagu played in two matches for the Marylebone Cricket Club, enjoying little success as a batsman. He wrote two autobiographical works.

== Early life and Crimean War ==
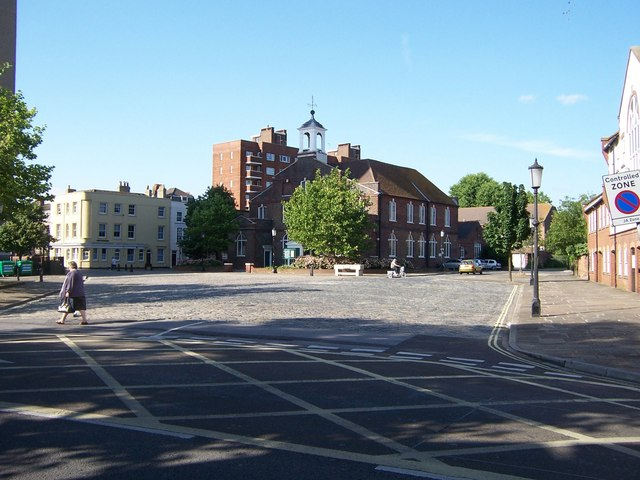
Montagu attended a naval school in St. Georges Square (pictured) in Portsmouth.

The son of John Montagu, 7th Earl of Sandwich and Lady Mary Paget, he was born at Westminster in April 1841. He was educated by a private tutor. He joined the Royal Navy as a cadet six months short of his twelfth birthday in 1853, with encouragement from his father and misgivings from his mother. He had prior to this attended a naval school in Portsmouth prior to taking his naval entry exams, which Montagu described as a "rough school".

In December 1853 with the Crimean War waging, he was posted HMS Princess Royal, commanded by his uncle, Lord Clarence Paget. Soon after boarding the ship his uncle made him his aide-de-camp. In February the Baltic Fleet was anchored at Spithead when Queen Victoria, Montagu's godmother, came to inspect the fleet. Upon hearing her godson was present aboard Princess Royal, she requested his presence. That evening the fleet set sail to take part in the Baltic campaign. The ship engaged Russian forts at Hangö, before sailing to anchor at Køge Bay. In August 1854, Montagu saw action in the Anglo-French victory at the Battle of Bomarsund. Shortly thereafter the fleet sailed for Reval, where it lay anchor. In October 1854, owing to ill health, Lord Paget transferred Montagu to his friend Harry Eyere's ship, HMS St George. The ship returned Montagu to England, where he was collected by his father and taken to Ryde to recuperate.

Montagu remained in England until January 1855, having fully recuperated. He received orders to return to Princess Royal off the Russian port of Sevastopol, returning aboard a hired transport sailing from Plymouth, via Gibraltar, Malta and Constantinople. At Constantinople he waited to board HMS Caradoc for passage into the Black Sea, meeting Florence Nightingale during his wait. In May, the Princess Royal sailed with the combined fleets to Kerch, having taken aboard troops from the 90th Regiment of Foot to be taken ashore. He escaped injury on one occasion when Princess Royal engaged the Russian Constantine Battery, with the fort returning fire resulting in the loss of two men and injury to five others. Cholera struck the ship soon after, lasting for two weeks and claiming eleven lives, though Montagu was unaffected. At some point he injured his foot, which laid him up for three weeks in a cot in Lord Paget's cabin.

Montagu as a midshipman

When Lord Paget was invalided, he was replaced as captain by Sir Lewis Jones, who retained Montagu in his role as aide-de-camp. He was present for the heaviest bombardment of Sevastopol which took place in September 1855, while in October he sailed with a detachment of the 63rd Foot for their assault on a fortified spit near the entrance of the Sea of Azov. Following the end of the war, Montagu returned to England via Constantinople, where he was a guest of Lord Stratford de Redcliffe, and the Greek Islands, where he had his first experience of yacht racing. For his service in the Crimean War, he was decorated by the Ottoman Empire with the Order of the Medjidie, Fifth Class in April 1858, at which point he held the rank of midshipman.

== Second Opium War and Indian Mutiny ==
Montagu briefly served in the Mediterranean Fleet as a midshipman aboard the dispatch boat HMS Foxhound under the command of A. C. Hobart. He was personally selected to serve aboard the frigate HMS Raleigh by Henry Keppel, with the ship departing from Portsmouth for China Station in October 1856; Raleigh's 28-day voyage to the Cape of Good Hope was considered to be a record for a sailing ship. After brief stops at Penang and Singapore, Raleigh proceeded with haste to Hong Kong with war imminent with China. After several months at sea, Raleigh came to within thirty miles of Hong Kong, when on 14 April 1857 the ship struck uncharted rocks. Despite the efforts of the ships crew to pump the water out of the ship for long enough to reach Hong Kong, the Raleigh ended up beaching on mud banks, with the ships crew evacuating to a nearby island. With assistance from the French Navy, the crew returned to Hong Kong, with Montagu returning aboard HMS Nanking.

Montagu was assigned to HMS Hong Kong, again under the command of Keppel. Hong Kong sailed for the Canton River in May and was present for the victory at Fatshan Creek in June. Following the action at Fatshun, war operations for the Hong Kong were more or less over, with the ship conducting anti-pirate patrols in the waters around Hong Kong. In July 1857, he was transferred to HMS Pearl under the captaincy of Edward Sotheby. After shore leave in Hong Kong, Montagu was ordered to return to the Pearl where it was to sail for Calcutta to help in the effort to suppress the Indian Mutiny. Upon arrival in Calcutta, the Pearl's Naval Brigade, consisting initially of 100 Royal Marines and sailors was formed. Montagu was not initially part of the first detachment and spent six weeks in Calcutta, where he socialised with Lord and Lady Canning. Montagu was added to the Naval Brigade in October, which took its numbers up to 175.

The additions to the brigade were ordered to reinforce Sotheby and sailed aboard a steamer up the Ganges past Benares, before disembarking at Patna in November. There Montagu purchased a pony. The brigade was stationed on the borders of the Gorakhpur district and in November 1857 they faced mostly disorganised rebels. The brigade initially fortified their position on the basis of superior rebel numbers, with Montagu noting general mistreatment of natives by British forces. By late December he had been appointed aide-de-camp to General Rowcroft, the commander of forces for which the Naval Brigade formed. On 26 December Montagu saw action against some 4,000 to 5,000 Sepoy mutineers, with the smaller British force of 1,400 men and four guns routing the native forces. From later December to February 1858, Montagu was charged with sending out detachments to burn rebel villages and the houses of Rajas. Later Montagu assisted the brigade in constructing a bridge over the Gogra to allow Jung Bahadur Rana army of Gurkhas to cross into Oude to assist Lord Clyde. Shortly after he saw action at the Battle of Phoolpore, which resulted in a British victory, which secured passage to Lucknow.

The brigade were not part of the force which marched for Lucknow, instead being sent back to defend the Gorakhpur district. There they engaged rebel forces in a number of skirmishes, before being sent to a cantonment at Bustee following the Capture of Lucknow in March 1858. There they remained for seven months until November, playing cricket to keep himself amused. The brigade final action came in December 1858, at Toolsepore on the edge of the Terai jungle, where the rebels were rumoured to be making a grand last stand. The rebels were engaged and fled, with Montagu pursuing them for three days toward Intwa, joining up with the forces of Sir Hope Grant. On 3 January 1859, the Naval Brigade was ordered to return to the Pearl via Allahabad, returning to Calcutta on 2 February. On the return voyage home, Montagu learnt of the death his mother. Montagu's contribution to helping suppress the mutiny was praised by both Houses of Parliament and being decorated with the Indian Mutiny Medal.

== Later career and life ==
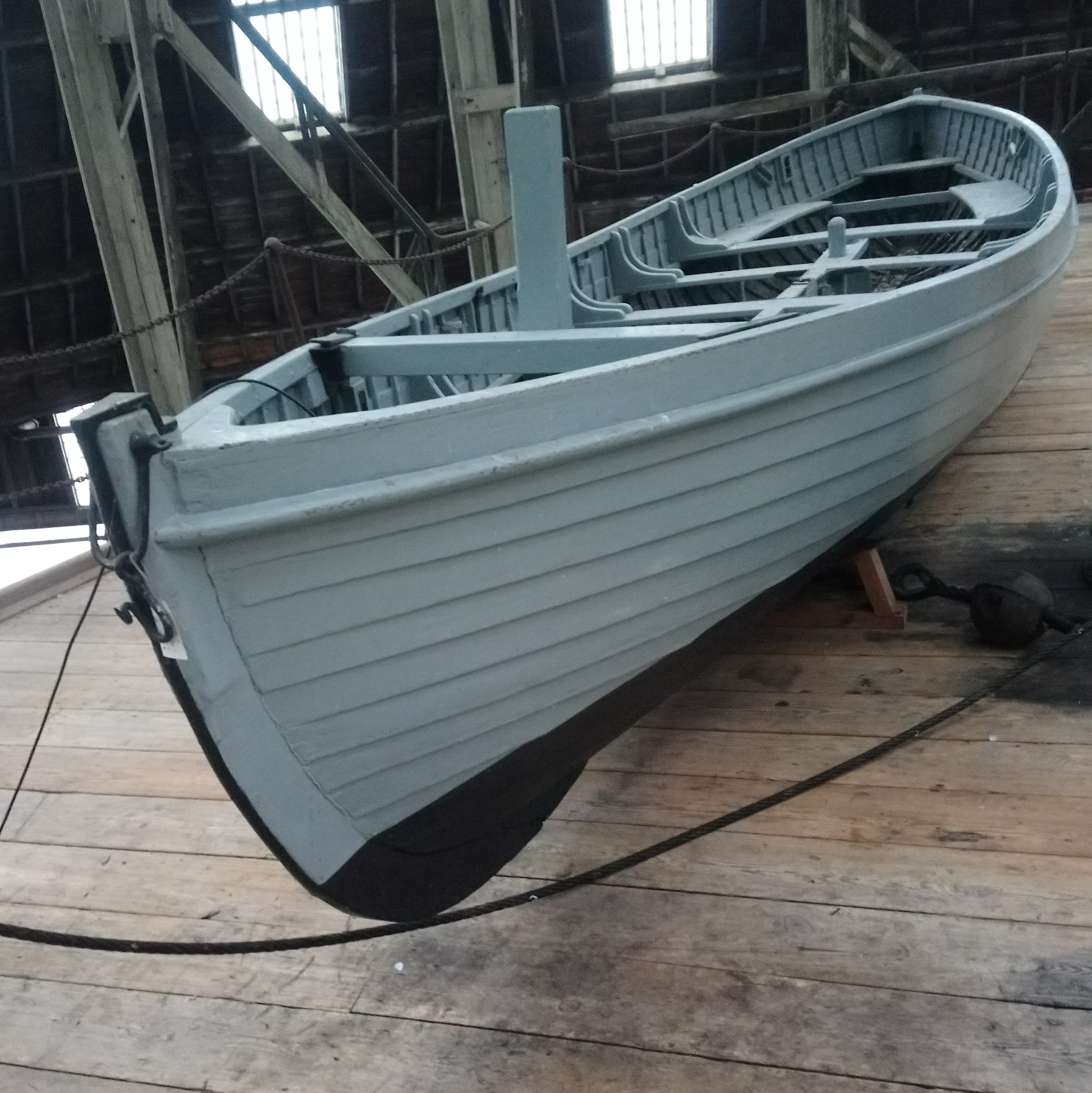
Montagu invented the Montagu whaler (pictured) in 1890.

Having returned to England in June 1859, Montagu was afforded two months leave, after which he was appointed to HMS Algiers of the Channel Fleet. He attained six years as a midshipman in the spring of 1860 and was promoted to lieutenant in July 1860. Montagu described his service with the Channel Fleet as "dull... after years of excitement and constant change". He was later promoted to commander in September 1867. Montagu played first-class cricket for the Marylebone Cricket Club on two occasions, against Surrey at Lord's in 1868 and Hampshire at Southampton in 1869. He had little success in his brief foray into first-class cricket, scoring 4 runs from his two matches.

Montagu was promoted to captain in February 1877 and was given command of the corvette HMS Garnet in September 1882. Montagu commanded Garnet when it was involved in an incident in Grenada. Having sought the unofficial permission of Sir William Robinson in Barbados to destroy the offices of The Grenada People newspaper, Garnet sailed for Grenada where a detachment went ashore and threatened to destroy the offices and press of the newspaper; however, the crew did not carry out their threats, but Montagu wrote a letter to the editor of the newspaper, threatening to horsewhip him for criticising Robinson's governorship of Barbados. This prompted a debate in the House of Commons. Montagu retired from active service in January 1885, having decided to do so as his deafness, which he had contracted from malaria during the mutiny, had become profoundly worse, coupled with other personal affairs. He was placed on the retired list following his retirement. In 1892, whilst still on the retired list, Montagu was promoted to rear admiral.

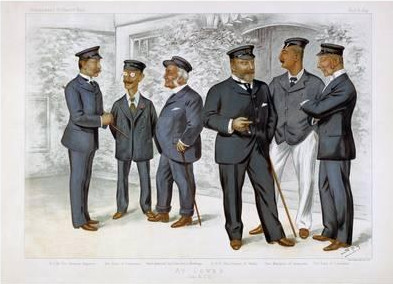
Montagu (third from left) depicted with members of the Royal Yacht Squadron including the Prince of Wales, the future Edward VII, (fourth from left) at Cowes in 1894.

A member of the Royal Yacht Squadron from 1892, Montagu took up yachting around 1880, beginning with his first boat Netty. He later constructed several boats, including Carina, which was the first English boat to win at Kiel Week. He designed the Montagu whaler in 1890, which was the standard seaboat of the Royal Navy from 1910 to 1970. The design replaced a variety of smaller craft with one single, versatile craft. He was later made a Companion to the Order of the Bath in 1907 Birthday Honours, with his honour being described as marking the 50th anniversary of military operations in India in 1857. Montagu died at his Rutland Gate residence in Brompton shortly before midnight on 30 January 1915. At the time of his death he was the heir presumptive to his brother, Edward, 8th Earl of Sandwich.

== Legacy ==
Montagu wrote two autobiographical books; A Middy's Recollections, 1853–1860 (1898) about his career as a midshipman and Reminiscences of Admiral Montagu (1910) about his life in general. Montagu was a member of the Turf Club and the Marlborough Club. He maintained residences at Wherwell Priory near Andover, Hampshire and at Belgrave Square in London.

In one of his last letters he wrote to a friend in Cincinnati, Ohio, United States about the First World War. He correctly foretold that Italy would join the war in 1915. Montagu warned of future conflicts that America faced after the war, potentially in South America or with Spain. He urged a doubling of the size of the US Navy to face this threat. He also warned of the "curse" of aliens, urging the United States to not allow them into its navy. He stated that if he were in charge of the British government he would forbid the naturalisation of foreign nationals. Montagu's personal correspondence and papers are held privately but accessible by enquiry to The National Archives, some correspondence is held by the National Maritime Museum.

== Marriage and issue ==
Montagu married Lady Agneta Harriet Yorke, the daughter of Charles Yorke, 4th Earl of Hardwicke in November 1867. The couple had four children. Their son, George, succeeded Montagu's brother as the 9th Earl of Sandwich in 1916, and their three daughters were granted title and precedence of earl's daughters by royal warrant in 1917.

- Lady Mary Sophie Montagu (4 July 1870 – 31 January 1946), died unmarried
- Lady Olga Blanche Montagu (29 August 1873 – 4 August 1951), died unmarried
- George Charles Montagu (1874–1962), married American heiress Alberta Sturges and succeeded as 9th Earl of Sandwich
- Lady Helena Léopoldine Montagu (16 April 1880 – 14 December 1958) married Sir Thomas Alexander Vans Best

== Bibliography ==
- Montagu, Victor Alexander (1898). A Middy's Recollections, 1853–1860. A. and C. Black.
