= George Montagu, 9th Earl of Sandwich =

British politician (1874–1962)

The Right Honourable The Earl of Sandwich
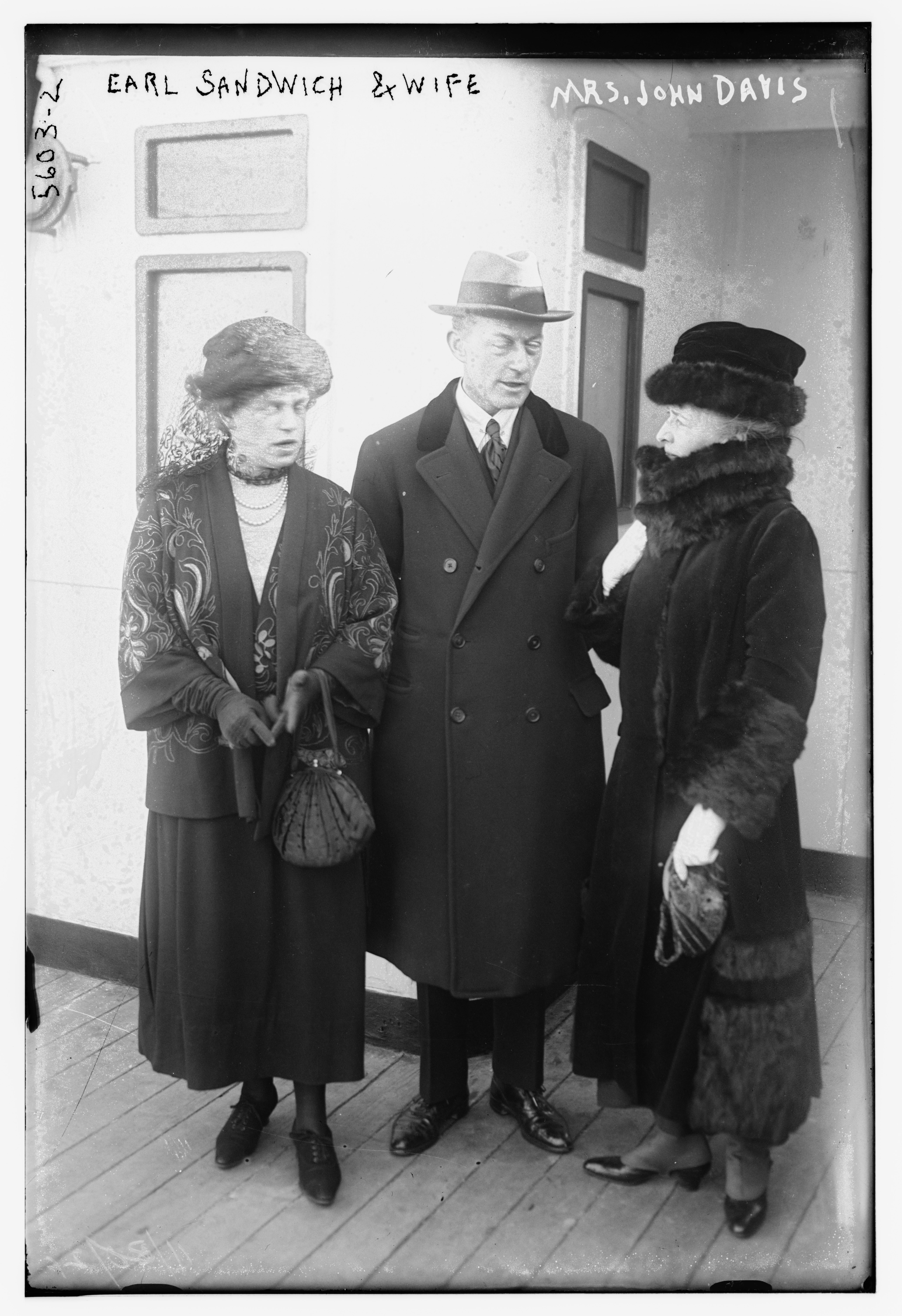
- Lord Sandwich (centre) with his wife (left) and Mrs John Davis (right) in 1921.

Personal details
- Born: George Charles Montagu; 29 December 1874
- Died: 15 June 1962 (aged 87)
- Spouse(s): Alberta Sturges (m. 1905; died 1951) Amiya Corbin (m. 1952)
- Children: Victor Montagu, 10th Earl of Sandwich; William Drogo Sturges Montagu; Lady Mary Faith Culme-Seymour; Lady Elizabeth Montagu
- Parents: Victor Montagu (father); Lady Agneta Harriet Yorke (mother)

George Charles Montagu, 9th Earl of Sandwich (29 December 1874 – 15 June 1962), known as George Montagu until 1916, was a British Conservative politician.

Sandwich was the son of Rear-Admiral the Hon. Victor Alexander Montagu, second son of John Montagu, 7th Earl of Sandwich. His mother was Lady Agneta Harriet, daughter of Charles Yorke, 4th Earl of Hardwicke. He was Assistant Private Secretary to the Board of Trade from 1898 to 1900. The latter year he was returned to Parliament for Huntingdon, a seat he held until 1906. In 1916 Sandwich succeeded his uncle in the earldom and entered the House of Lords. He served as chairman of the Central Prisoners of War Committee from November 1917 until 1919. He later served as Lord-Lieutenant of Huntingdonshire between 1922 and 1946.

== Marriage and family ==
Lord Sandwich married twice. His first marriage was to Alberta Sturges, daughter of William Sturges of New York City, at St Paul's Church, Knightsbridge, in 1905. The couple had four children:

- Alexander Victor Edward Paulet Montagu (22 May 1906 – 25 February 1995); succeeded as the 10th Earl of Sandwich before disclaiming the title two years later. He was succeeded in the title by his son John.
- Hon. William Drogo Sturges Montagu (29 May 1908 – 26 January 1940); married the Hon. Janet Gladys Aitken (1908–1988), former wife of Ian Campbell (later 11th Duke of Argyll). He died during World War II.
- Lady Mary Faith Montagu (1 November 1911 – 16 February 1983)
- Lady Elizabeth Montagu (4 July 1917 – 10 January 2006)

In 1944, Lord Sandwich passed his estate and mansion to his first son, Victor, and moved to a cottage.

Following his first wife's death in October 1951, George Montagu remarried on 13 December 1952 to a religious aide from Hollywood's Vedanta temple, Amiya Corbin (née Ella Lillian Sully, 28 January 1902 - February 1986), an English-born American citizen. Following the wedding, Lady Sandwich moved to the Hinshingbrook estate at Huntingdon with her husband.

He died in June 1962, aged 87, and was succeeded in the earldom by his eldest son, Victor, who was also a Conservative politician.

== Notes ==
Parliament of the United Kingdom
Preceded by Arthur Smith-Barry	Member of Parliament for Huntingdon; 1900–1906	Succeeded by Samuel Whitbread
Honorary titles
Preceded by Howard Coote	Lord-Lieutenant of Huntingdonshire; 1922–1946	Succeeded by Granville Proby
Peerage of England
Preceded by Edward Montagu	Earl of Sandwich; 1916–1962	Succeeded by Victor Montagu
