= Patrick Agnew (civil servant, born 1868) =

Sir Patrick Agnew KBE KStJ

Vice-Chairman and Managing Director, Central Prisoners of War Committee
- In office 1916–1919

Officiating Judge, Chief Court of the Punjab
- In office 1913–1914

Personal details
- Born: Patrick Dalreagle Agnew; 26 April 1868 Colony of Victoria
- Died: 5 September 1925 (aged 57) Oxford, England
- Education: Balliol College, Oxford

Sir Patrick Dalreagle Agnew KBE KStJ (26 April 1868 – 5 September 1925) was an Australian-born British officer and judge in the Indian Civil Service.

Agnew was born in the Colony of Victoria, the son of William Henry and Janet Moubray Agnew. He was educated at Bedford Grammar School and Balliol College, Oxford, and joined the Indian Civil Service in 1889. He served as assistant commissioner in the Punjab until 1898, when he was promoted to deputy commissioner. He was appointed a divisional judge in 1910 and officiating judge of the Chief Court of the Punjab in 1913, retiring the following year and returning to the United Kingdom, where he lived at 8 Northmoor Road, Oxford.

In 1916, he was appointed vice-chairman and managing director of the Central Prisoners of War Committee, run jointly by the British Red Cross Society and the Order of St John, remaining in the post until 1919. For this service, he was appointed Commander of the Order of the British Empire (CBE) on 4 December 1917 and Knight Commander of the Order of the British Empire (KBE) in the civilian war honours of 30 March 1920.

Agnew married Elizabeth Frances Seaton, daughter of an Indian Army officer from County Tipperary, Ireland, in 1897. They had one daughter. He died at Oxford on 5 September 1925 at the age of 57.
