= Rosemary Peto =

British artist (1916–1998)

- Born: Maud Rosemary Peto; 1916; London, England
- Died: 1998 (aged 81–82); Salisbury, England
- Education: Westminster School of Art; Royal College of Art
- Known for: Painting
- Spouse: Victor Montagu (m. 1934; div. 1958)
- Children: 7 (including John Montagu, 11th Earl of Sandwich

Maud Rosemary Peto (1916–1998) was a British painter and artist. As the wife of the Conservative politician Victor Montagu, she was titled Viscountess Hinchingbroke by courtesy from 1934 to 1958.

== Biography ==
Peto was born in London to Major Sir Ralph Harding Peto and Frances Ruby Vera Lindsay, a family of artists, and studied drawing at the Westminster School of Art during 1931 and 1932 and then, after a career break, at the Royal College of Art from 1953 to 1956. A medical course led Peto to an interest in biology and plants and both plant and flowers featured heavily in her first solo exhibition at the Sally Hunt & Patrick Seale Fine Art gallery in 1985. After her marriage to Victor Montagu, Peto was known as Viscountess Hinchingbroke. After her death, at Salisbury in Wiltshire, a retrospective exhibition of her paintings was held at the Mall Galleries in London during 1999.
