= Montagu whaler =

Type of boat

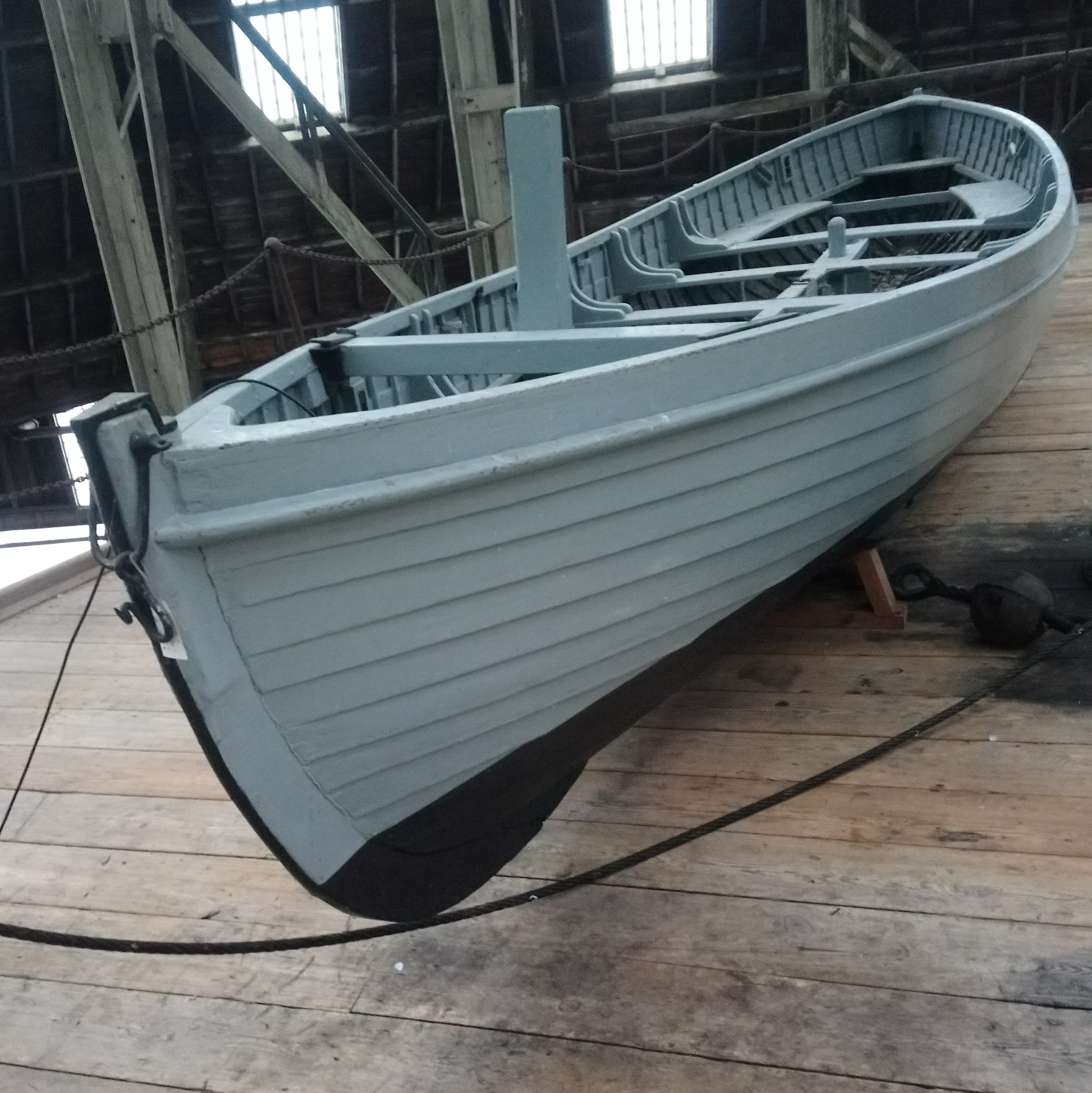
- Montagu Whaler within Chatham Dockyard

Class overview
- Name: Montagu whaler
- Builders: Numerous
- Operators: Royal Navy; Royal Australian Navy; Royal New Zealand Navy; Royal Canadian Navy
- In commission: 1900s–1970s

General characteristics
- Type: Ship's boat
- Length: 27 feet (8.2 m); some built at 25 feet (7.6 m)
- Beam: 6 feet (1.8 m)
- Draught: 1 foot 5 inches (0.43 m)
- Sail plan: standing lug yawl
- Complement: 6

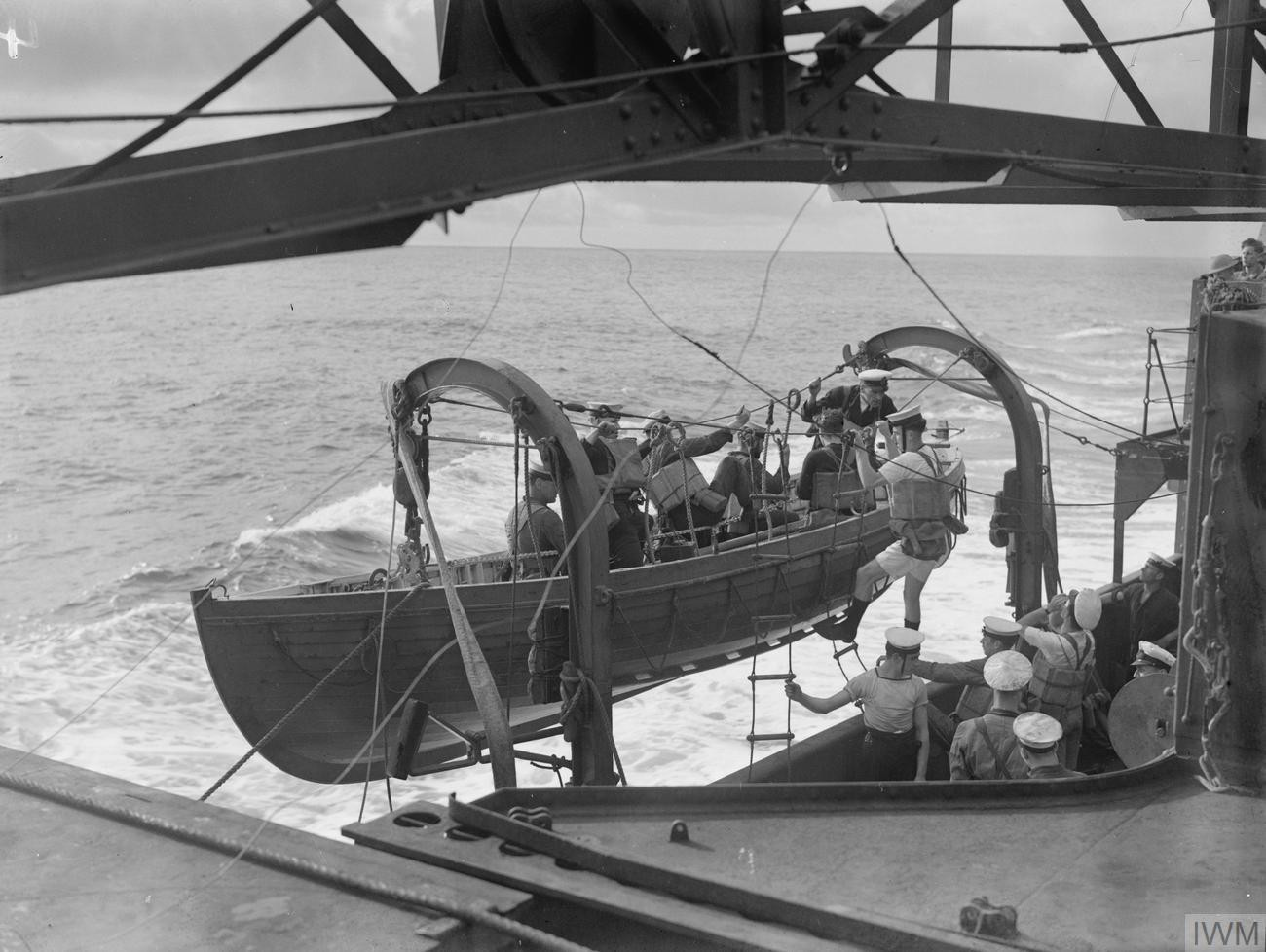
A Montagu whaler being manned with an armed boarding party going to check a neutral vessel stopped at sea. October 1941

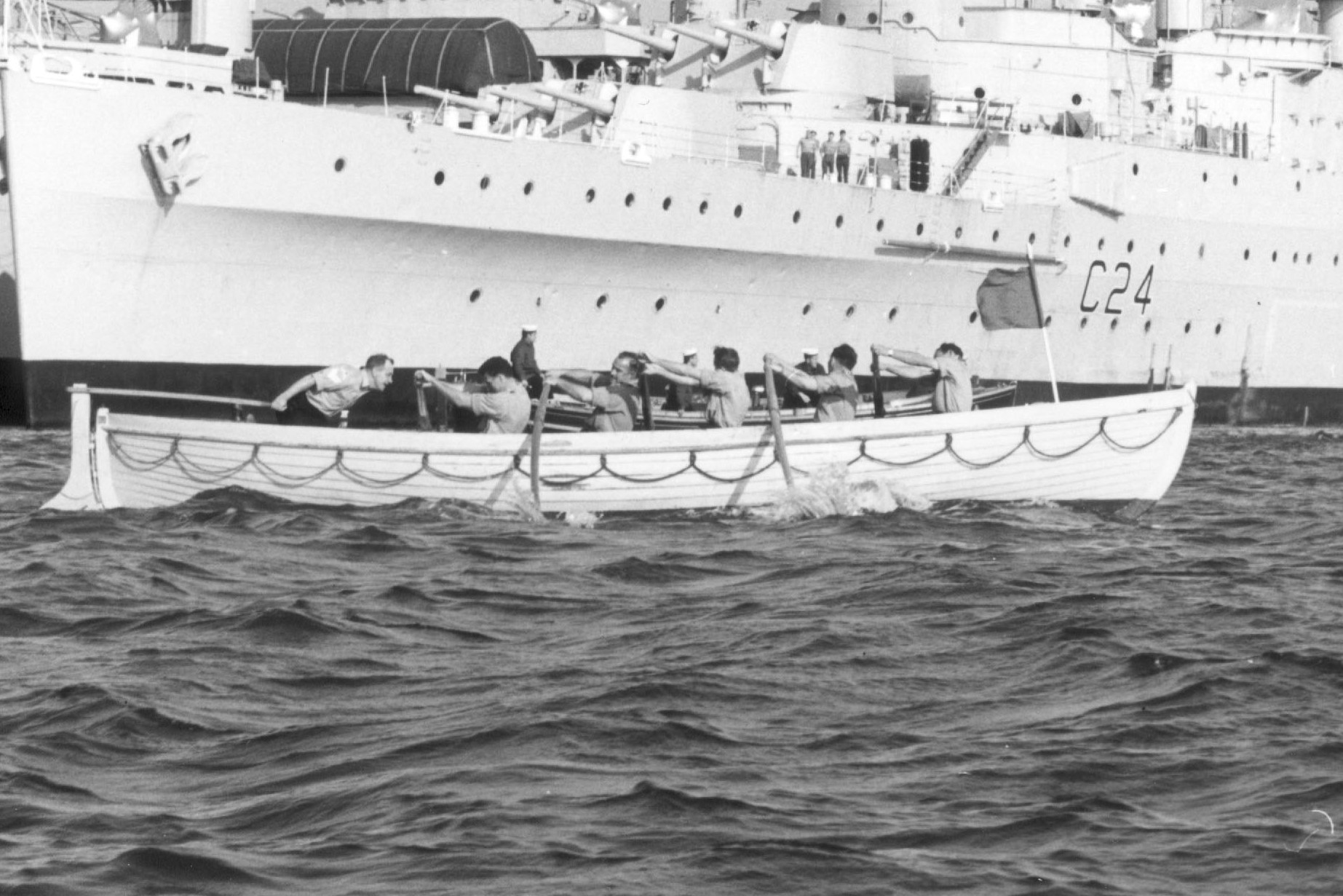
A Montagu whaler being raced under oars. The distinctive asymmetric arrangement of the oars is clearly seen: 2 on one side and 3 on the other

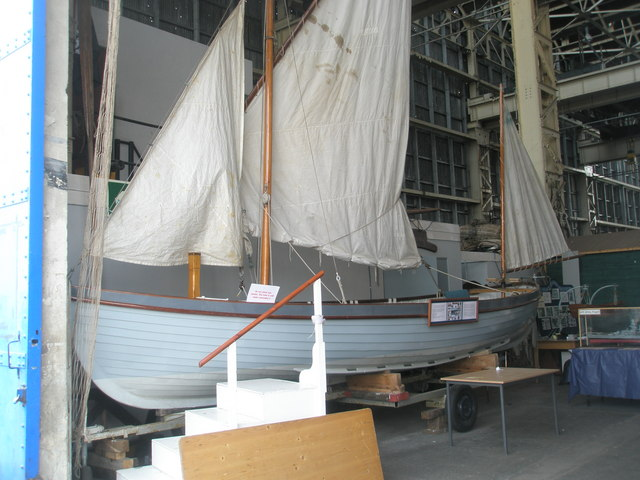
A restored Montagu whaler in Portsmouth dockyard. The mainsail is displayed in a reefed condition: the yard would normally be higher up the mast and the sail coming down lower.

The Montagu whaler was the standard seaboat of the Royal Navy between 1910 and 1970, it was a clinker built 27 by 6 feet (8.2 m × 1.8 m) open boat, which could be pulled by oars or powered by sail – a shorter version of 25 feet (7.6 m) was also built. It was double-ended; having a pointed stem and stern. Retired Rear Admiral The Honourable Victor Montagu proposed the design.

The Royal Navy - and associated Commonwealth navies such as the Royal Australian Navy, Royal New Zealand Navy - used the whalers until the 1960s. They were used for service, training and recreation. Whaler races were organised between ships and ports; minor royalty often handed out the trophies. After service, some were passed on to other groups, including the Sea Cadets.

The whaler was later fitted with outboard motors; a less successful derivative had an on-board petrol motor. When rowed, it had had five oarsmen and a coxwain; in all it could carry 27 men.

== History ==
The Naval whaler was derived from commercial whaleboats, which were successful sea boats that whalers launched from whaleships to pursue whales. The whaleboats were clinker-built craft that were propelled by oars or two sails, a foresail, and a mainsail.

The first reference to ‘whaleboats’, was in 1756. They were introduced into Royal Naval service around 1810, when they were called ‘whale-gigs’. They were used to take boarding parties to enemy ships. They were fitted with buoyancy tanks to make then unsinkable, and so had a secondary role as lifeboats.

During the mid-19th century, they were used in vessels suppressing the slave trade off Africa, in the surf conditions that prevailed in this work. By 1862 they were officially called 'whalers'.

At the turn of the 20th century, retired The Hon. Rear Admiral Victor Alexander Montagu (1841–1915) proposed a few changes to the standard whaler. It was to come in two lengths, 27 ft and 25 ft, and the beam was widened making it more stable. A drop keel was added, which altered the balance so the rig was changed, to mainsail and mizzen. This became known as the Montagu whaler. In this configuration, it continued in service until the 1970s in New Zealand

After 1956 the Montagu was gradually replaced with the 27-foot Motor Whaler, a three-in-one whaler with an inboard petrol engine: this could also be pulled or sailed. They were heavy and handled poorly, and were superseded by the Motor Whaler Mod 1. which abandoned the sailing rig. They continued until the 1990s.

== Description ==
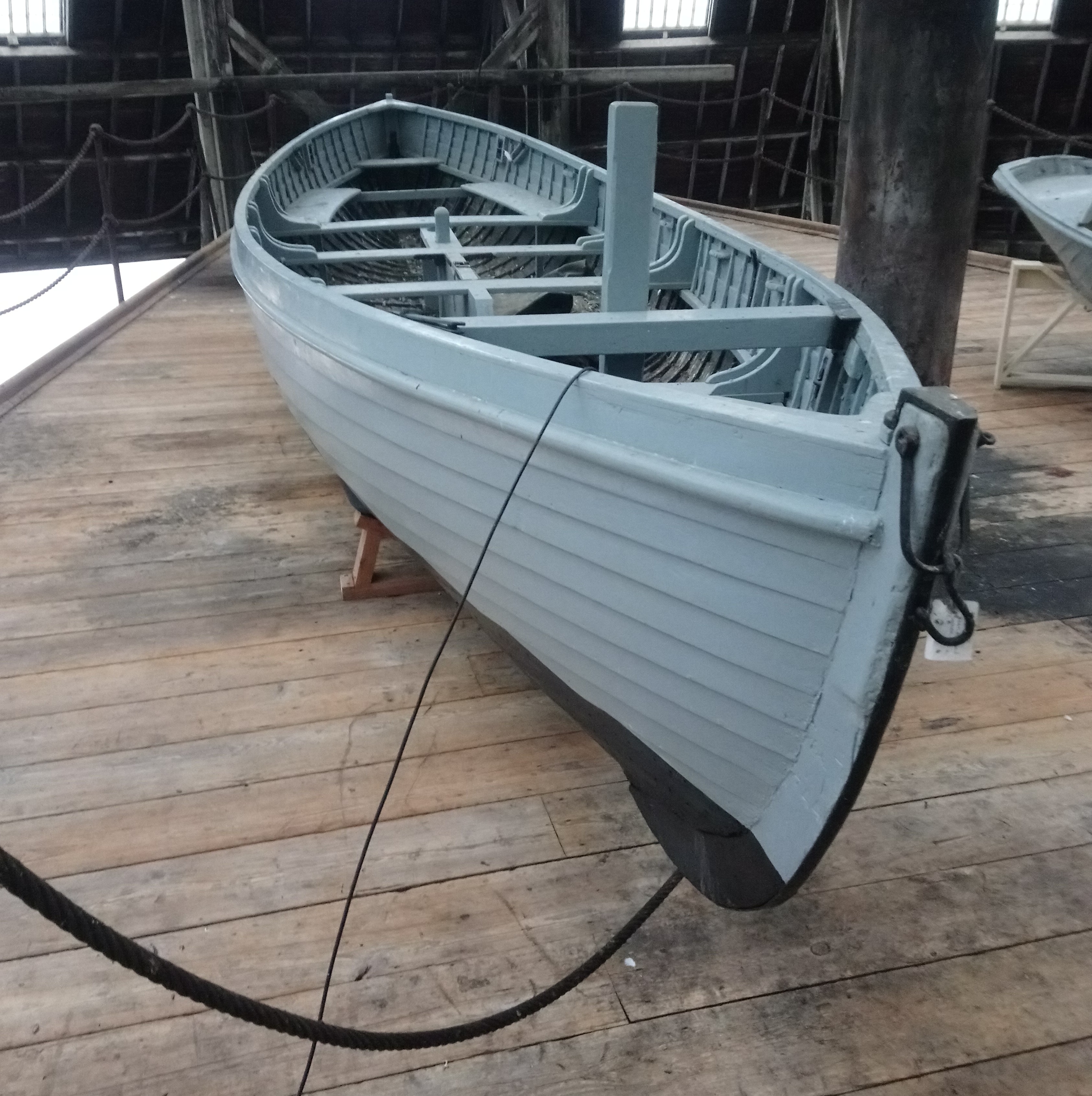
Montagu whaler, Chatham

The Montagu whaler is a 27 feet (8.2 m) clinker built boat with a generous 6 feet (1.8 m) beam, fitted with a drop keel. In England they were built from wych elm or sand elm. In Malta they used mahogany.

Length: 27 feet (8.2 m)

Beam: 6 feet (1.8 m)

Draught: 1 foot 5 inches (0.43 m)

Weight: (Normal load) 20.5cwt (1020 kg)

Life Saving Capacity: 27

=== K type rig ===
This is a yawl rig with a (standing lug) mainsail. The main mast is stepped on the keelson and it is secured by an iron clamp to the second thwart. It is held by a forestay and two shrouds. The mizzen is stepped abaft the stern benches in a shoe on the hog.

Main masts: 16 feet 6 inches (5.0 m)

Mizzen mast: 13 feet (4.0 m)

Yard: 15 feet 3 inches (4.65 m) (standing lug)

Boom: 6 feet 10 inches (2.08 m)

=== K type canvas ===
Mainsail: 142 square feet (13.2 m^{2}) This is loose footed and laced to the yard which is raised on a traveller on the mainmast. The sheets are rove to the rear thwart. Throat brails are fitted, and used when gybing.

Jib 32 square feet (3.0 m^{2})

Trisail 68 square feet (6.3 m^{2})

Mizzen 30 square feet (2.8 m^{2})

Oars: 4 x 17 feet (5.2 m)

1 x 16 feet (4.9 m)

== Victor Alexander Montagu ==
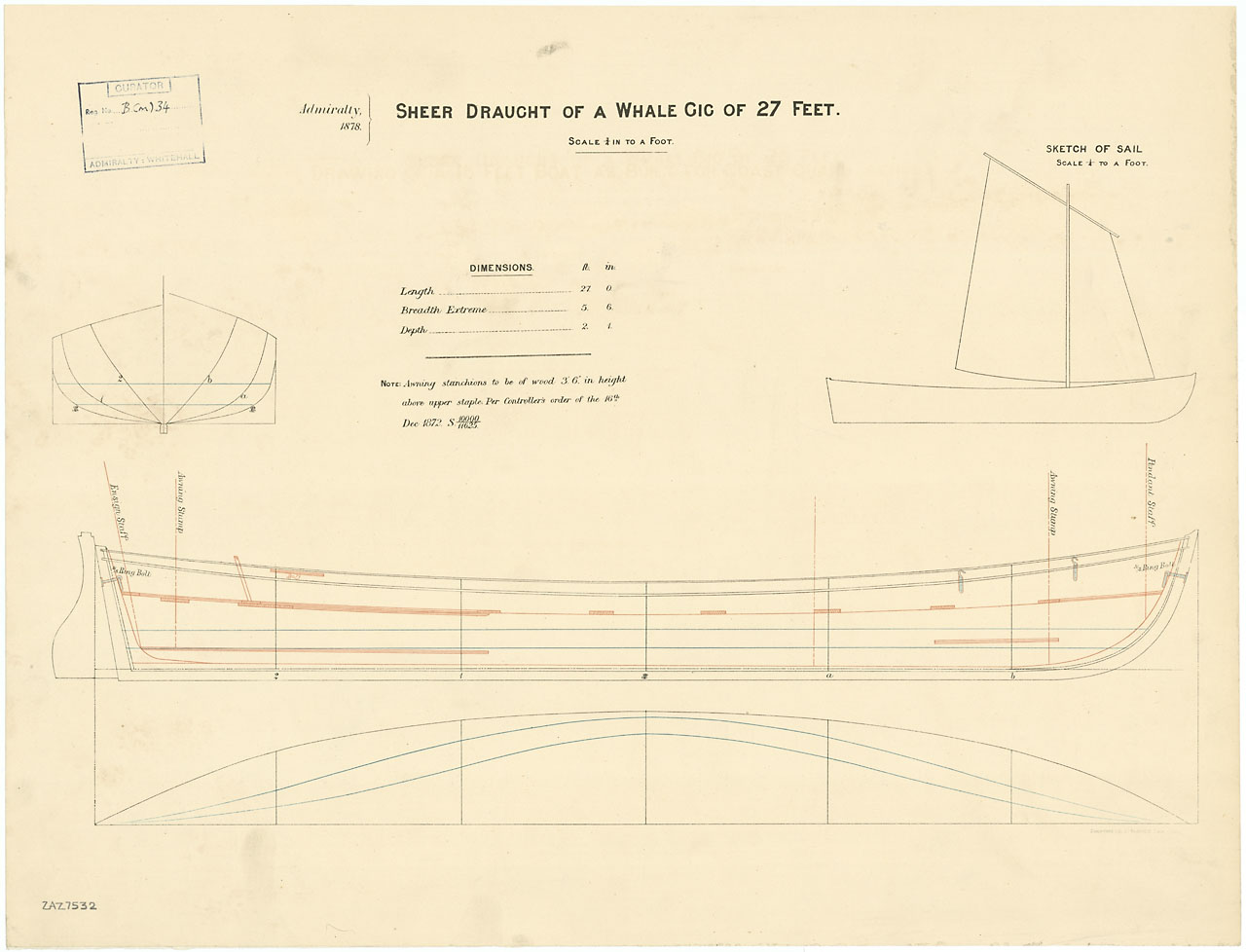
A Royal Navy "whale gig" of 1878. This is the type of boat from which the Montagu Whaler was developed.

Victor Alexander Montagu was the second son of the seventh Earl of Sandwich. His mother, a daughter of the Marquis of Anglesea, who commanded cavalry at Waterloo. His ancestor, the fourth Earl of Sandwich, John Montagu, served as First Lord of the Admiralty and sponsored the voyages of Captain James Cook.

Victor Alexander entered naval college in September 1853 at the age of twelve. In December 1853 he joined HMS Princess Royal, a 91-gun screw-propelled second-rate, as a midshipman junior officer, where he became A.D.C. to his uncle. He was given his first command, his uncle's 12-oared cutter.

He saw active service during the Crimean War, 1854–1856, the 2nd China War where he survived the shipwreck of frigate HMS Raleigh (1845), and the Indian Mutiny in 1857, Winning five service medals he retired as a captain in 1886. and was promoted to rear admiral on the retired list on 14 February 1892

== Service Use ==
The whaler was often the largest boat on many of the smaller warships. Therefore, it usually had the job of seaboat. This is a boat kept ready for immediate lowering whilst at sea. It is equipped with water, food and other stores in case the boat should be separated from the ship for any length of time. There is one seaboat on each side of a ship, so that the leeward boat may be lowered. The falls from the davits attach to a patent disengaging gear so that they may be detached from the boat simultaneously, with the boat just above the water. This allows the seaboat to be lowered whilst the ship still has way on. Each watch had an assigned seaboat crew and a team of lowerers to get the boat away. This meant there was no delay in assembling a crew if a boat was needed immediately.

The role of the seaboat was varied, including transfer of personnel between ships whilst at sea and recovering a man overboard. During wartime, this list extended with the rescue of survivors from sunken ships and crash-landed aircraft, gathering the (sometimes gory) evidence of the destruction of a U-boat and, in several instances, boarding of German vessels to capture code books and other associated material. The coding material captured by the boarding party dispatched from HMS Griffin in a Montagu whaler enabled the first breaking of the German naval enigma code. Whilst the break was retrospective, it taught the Bletchley Park cryptographers a great deal and facilitated future breaks – in which other boarding parties in whalers had an essential role as use of the Enigma code system was improved.

In port, an important function was to maintain communication with the shore when a vessel was anchored off. The desire to hook up to the shore electricity has caused warships go alongside a jetty, wharf, or quay. The whaler was used to help set or weigh anchor, and fetch water. In addition it was used for training and numerous competitive activities.

This would have a six-man crew:

- Coxswain – Pilots boat and issues command from afore the Mizzen mast.
- Stroke (rearmost)
- Bowman- the lookout (referred to as ‘Bow’)
- No. 2 – stationed near mast
- No. 3 – stationed midships
- No. 4 – stationed before stroke

Preparing the whaler to sail was a co-operative process involving all members of the crew, at the command UP MAST, RIG THE BOAT, the mast had to be set and secured, the centreboard lowered. The sails have to be raised and trimmed.

=== Pulling races ===
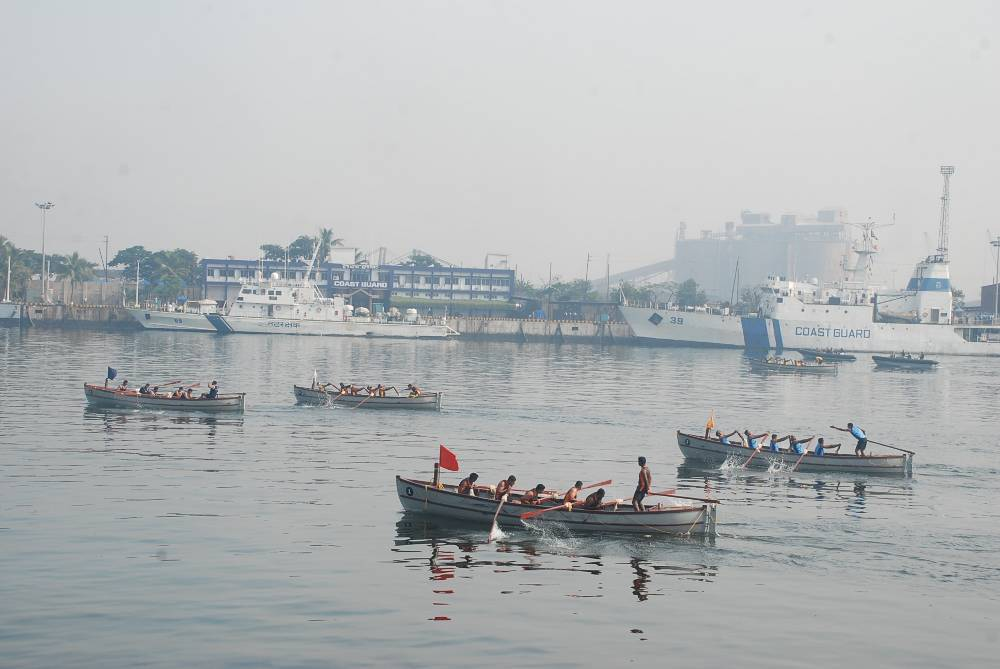
A whaler pulling race in India in 2016

== BRNC Whalers ==
BRNC whaler

Similar 27' motor whalers are still used by Britannia Royal Naval College to train officer cadets in basic seamanship. These boats are constructed from glass-fibre reinforced plastic and powered by three-cylinder inboard diesel engines. The boats were constructed between 1970 and 1989.

== Leisure Use ==
When whalers were replaced by rigid inflatables, some were passed down to auxiliary reserves and sea cadet units as training vessels. Others were abandoned and some rescued by enthusiasts, two were seen for many years decaying at Sunderland Point, Lancaster. The Swan took part in the 2019 Great River Race in London, completing the course in 3 hr 15 min 10 sec.

The Swan was a typical Montagu, she was badly burnt then was acquired by Bernie Bruing in the 1960s and towed to Cornwall Beach where she was restored and used for family boat trips. It was sold to Brown of Falmouth and consequently donated to a ferry company but left to rot. Falmouth boat builders recovered her and repaired her so she could be used again, but had no further use for her. Bernie Bruing wrote the folk song ‘The Lament to the Passing of the Montagu Whaler’

Steve Evans, of the Bristol Charity All Aboard Watersports, came across her while doing internet research, and obtained her for a few pounds and brought her to Bristol to be fully restored at Underfall Yard then to join the All Aboard Watersports fleet.

A Moontague whaler was used in 2024 by 6 man team 'Victory or Duff' in the 750 natutical mile motorless Race to Alaska from Washington State to Alaska.
