= North Star affair =

1861 piracy incident off Hong Kong

- Part of Piracy in Asia
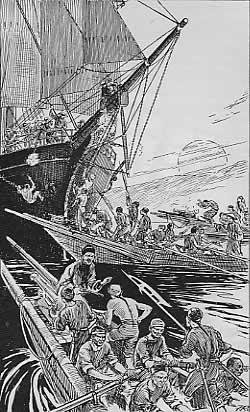
- Chinese pirates attacking a merchant ship.
| Date | 13–14 May 1861 |
| Location | off Ling Ting, Hong Kong, China, South China Sea |
| Result | Merchant ship robbed then release |

Belligerents
| United Kingdom | Chinese Pirates |

Commanders and leaders
| (United Kingdom) Voight | Unknown |

Strength
| 1 brig | 1 junk |

Casualties and losses
| 8 killed 1 wounded | None |

The North Star affair occurred in May 1861 when Chinese pirates attacked the British merchant ship North Star. Several men were killed in the incident, including a Royal Navy officer. The pirates escaped capture with 4,000 dollars' worth of gold.

== Affair ==
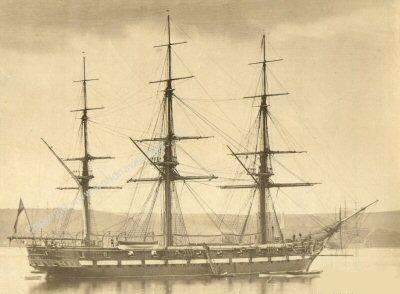
HMS Pearl, circa 1856

The affair began on 13 May 1861, when the British brig North Star left Hong Kong for Nagasaki, Japan. The ship was unarmed except for a few muskets and pistols belonging to Captain Voight of the Royal Navy corvette HMS Pearl, and the other Europeans on board. Most of the people aboard the brig were Chinese civilians though some were pirates, according to Henry Marks, who was a fourth mate on North Star. Marks claimed that the compradore at Hong Kong, named Ty-kee, was in league with the pirates as he placed a young Chinese boy and a steward on the ship who acted suspiciously during the event. At 3:00 pm, North Star was about thirty miles from the port of Hong Kong, near Ling Ting, when a two-masted junk was spotted. It then quickly maneuvered alongside of North Star and her crew began throwing "stinkpots" as Henry Marks described. The pots contained a smelly, flammable liquid and were used commonly by the Chinese pirates for taking over merchantmen. North Star's helmsman was the first casualty; he was apparently burned to death by the pots.

Twenty to thirty pirates then boarded the vessel with spears and swords and went after the remaining crewmen and any of the passengers who resisted. Captain Voight was overpowered and wounded by six of the pirates in his cabin before he could load his guns. One seaman fought the Chinese with a handspike before being wounded; he later died on 16 May along with the captain. The chief officer also died on 14 May of his stab wounds and a passenger was stabbed and thrown overboard where he apparently drowned. In all eight men were killed and one other was wounded. Marks late wrote that the Chinese boy helped the pirates find the 4,000 dollars on board and after they removed the two treasure chests they reboarded their junk and sailed away with the boy and the steward. Of the crew there were only three survivors; two young British men survived the encounter by hiding in the ship and when the pirates were gone they steered her back for Hong Kong. Henry Marks survived as well, having swum for several hours, with the help of some floating spears, from the scene of the crime until being thrown onto a group of large rocks 400 yards (370 m) off the coast. Marks was able to see the activities of the pirates after the attack; they anchored in a small bay nearby and didn't leave right away.

On the next morning, the mate sighted a sampan and paid the crew 300 dollars to take him to Hong Kong. Captain Voight made a similar arrangement and safely made it to shore in another small boat. Marks reported that the Chinese treated him like a prisoner while on board the sampan and tried to avoid Green Island where HMS Pearl was anchored. When Marks was convinced that the Chinese he was next to were pirates, he "jumped up and struck one of them", then grabbed the man and forced the crew to sail to Pearl. At least four of the crewmen and one passenger were killed; the other two survivors, who sailed North Star back to Hong Kong, were first discovered by the Siamese barque named Four Stars and then by the boat crews of Pearl.

== See also ==
- Sumatran expeditions
