= Central Prisoners of War Committee =

The Central Prisoners of War Committee was a British organisation established in 1916 jointly by the British Red Cross Society and the Order of St John at the request of the government. Its function was to co-ordinate aid, especially food and comfort parcels, for British prisoners of war in Axis POW camps and also internment camps in Switzerland during the First World War. It was dissolved in 1919.

It opened extensive offices at 4 Thurloe Place, South Kensington, London SW7 (opposite Brompton Oratory), on 3 October 1916 and took over the duties of several previous organisations, including the Prisoners of War Help Committee, the Bread Fund for Prisoners of War and the British Prisoners of War in Germany Fund. Many other organisations continued to exist, but their efforts were now co-ordinated by the Central Committee. As well as supporting, co-ordinating and inspecting these organisations, it raised money itself and established its own branch to pack aid parcels. This supplied about a quarter of the total aid packages, with the remainder being provided by regimental and other aid committees, although about seventy of these relied on the Central Committee to provide packing services. The Central Committee's co-ordination meant that all prisoners received aid packages. Similar organisations in the British Dominions were affiliated to the Central Committee.

Sir Leander Starr Jameson was the chairman until his death in November 1917, when he was replaced by George Montagu, 9th Earl of Sandwich. Patrick Agnew, a retired Indian Civil Service officer, was vice-chairman and managing director from 1916 until 1919.

There was some disquiet with the regulations imposed by the Central Committee, which included forbidding private aid parcels and rigidly limiting the clothing that was allowed to be included, and claims of mismanagement. A parliamentary committee was appointed to enquire into it and its report was issued as a white paper on 26 June 1917. The main suggestion was that in future the committee should include representatives of regimental care committees and local associations. Sir Ivor Philipps MP continued to call for the members of the committee to resign, claiming they were causing "suffering and misery to British soldiers". From 1 October 1917, the Central Committee, which had previously only sent parcels to civilians and other ranks, also sent parcels to officers, although officers were still also permitted to receive private parcels. There had previously been complaints that the Admiralty had decided that Mercantile Marine officers were to be treated as officers, which was seen by some as insulting to "true" officers.

Food parcels, packed in cardboard boxes, weighed about 10 pounds each and about 14,000 were despatched by the Central Committee three times a fortnight. The Central Committee established a depot in Copenhagen to supply bread to prisoners in Germany, but due to major problems this soon closed, fuelling the accusations of mismanagement. It reopened in October 1917. By May 1918, about 500 people worked in the packing department at Thurloe Place.
