= Lady Agneta Montagu =

British aristocrat

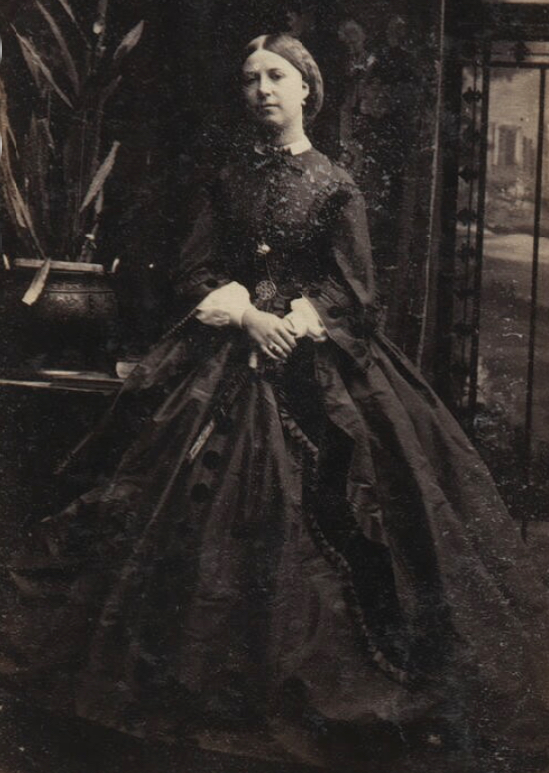
- Portrait of Lady Agneta in 1861 taken by Camille Silvy
- Born: Lady Agneta Harriet Yorke; 13 December 1838; Wimpole Hall, Cambridgeshire
- Died: 12 March 1919 (aged 80); Bournemouth, Dorset
- Resting place: St. Mary Magdalene Church; Brampton, Cambridgeshire
- Occupation: Courtier
- Spouse: Victor Montagu
- Children: George Montagu, 9th Earl of Sandwich
- Parent(s): Charles Yorke, 4th Earl of Hardwicke; Susan Liddell
- Relatives: Thomas Liddell, 1st Baron Ravensworth (grandfather)

Lady Agneta Harriet Montagu (née Yorke; 13 December 1838 – 12 March 1919), sometimes known as Lady Agnete Yorke and Lady Augusta Yorke, was a British aristocrat and courtier. She served as a bridesmaid at the wedding of Alexandra of Denmark and Edward VII in 1863 and as Lady of the Bedchamber in the household of Princess Helena of the United Kingdom, who was the daughter of Queen Victoria. She was the mother of George Montagu, 9th Earl of Sandwich.

== Biography ==
Lady Agneta was born on 13 December 1838 to Admiral Charles Yorke, 4th Earl of Hardwicke and The Honourable Susan Liddell, daughter of Thomas Liddell, 1st Baron Ravensworth. She was the sister of Charles Yorke, 5th Earl of Hardwicke, Eliot Constantine Yorke, and Elizabeth Philippa Biddulph, Lady Biddulph. She grew up on the Wimpole estate in Cambridgeshire. Queen Victoria attended a ball at Wimpole in October 1843 and wrote in her diary that "the 4 eldest [Yorke] Children appeared, very nicely dressed, and little Agneta looked so pretty."

She was photographed by Camille Silvy on 25 April 1861.

In 1863, Lady Agneta was one of eight bridesmaids who attended Princess Alexandra of Denmark at her marriage to the Prince of Wales. She wore a "magnificently rich" ornament around her neck and a wreath of pearls for the occasion, both gifts from her father. The other bridesmaids were the Viscountess Bertie of Thame, the Marchioness of Dufferin and Ava, Lady Ampthill, Lady Victoria Margaret Louisa Howard, Lady Diana de Vere Beauclerk, the Marchioness of Lothian, and Lady Thurlow. She and the other bridesmaids were painted by Robert Charles Dudley.

On 28 November 1867, Lady Agneta married The Honourable Victor Montagu, son of John Montagu, 7th Earl of Sandwich. They had four children: Helena Leopoldine Montagu, Olga Blanche Montagu, Mary Sophie Montagu, and George Charles Montagu.

She later served as the Lady of the Bedchamber in the household of Queen Victoria's daughter, Princess Helena of the United Kingdom.

Lady Agneta died on 12 March 1919. Her funeral was held at St. Mary Magdalene Church in Brampton and she was buried in the Montagu family's private burial plot there. Queen Alexandra sent a floral arrangement of orchids, snowdrops, and violets in the shape of a cross, to the funeral, along with a message reading: "In fond remembrance of dearest Agnete Montagu, one of my oldest friends and bridesmaids. Rest in peace now, united to your beloved husband. From Alexandra."

A painting of her is kept in a private collection and shown at the Birmingham Victorian Exhibition.
