= Pearl's Naval Brigade =

The Pearl's Naval Brigade was formed on 11 September 1857 when 175 officers and men of Royal Navy ship HMS Pearl formed a naval brigade which operated ashore during the Indian Mutiny with the Gurkhas and Sikhs providing artillery support. The Pearl and the frigate HMS Shannon were despatched from Hong Kong to Calcutta in July 1857 after receiving news of the rebellion. En route, they rescued the crew of the transport HMS Transit, which wrecked off Bangka Island, Sumatra.

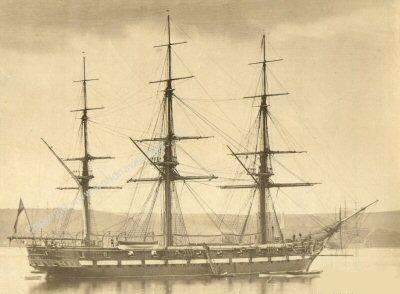
HMS Pearl c.1856

The brigade engaged in numerous actions against the rebel forces and most notably in the campaign that led to the Relief of Lucknow. They fought alongside a similar brigade formed by the crew of the Shannon, which was captained by William Peel VC CB, son of Prime Minister Sir Robert Peel and Victoria Cross recipient. The Shannon's brigade landed a considerable force of mobile guns and rifle companies, while the Pearl's Naval Brigade deployed mostly rifle companies. Capt. Peel took his men rapidly inland to Allahabad and Cawnpore, but he was severely injured at the Siege of Lucknow.

For 10 months, the brigade was commanded by the Pearl's captain, Edward Southwell Sotheby, who was later raised to the rank of admiral and knighted. For their role in suppressing the Indian uprising, Sotheby and his brigade were mentioned in dispatches on 13 occasions relating to the operations in Oudh, and received thanks of the governor-general of India and of both Houses of Parliament. For his service, Sotheby was made a Companion of the Order of the Bath (CB) and appointed an extra aide-de-camp to Queen Victoria. Peel was awarded a knighthood in January 1858, only to die of smallpox at Cawnpore in April.

== Bibliography ==
- 'Cruise of the Pearl with an Account of the Operations of the Naval Brigade in India' by Royal Navy Chaplain Rev. E A Williams Publisher: Naval & Military Press (2006) ISBN 978-1-84734-440-3
