= Victor Montagu =

British politician (1906–1995)

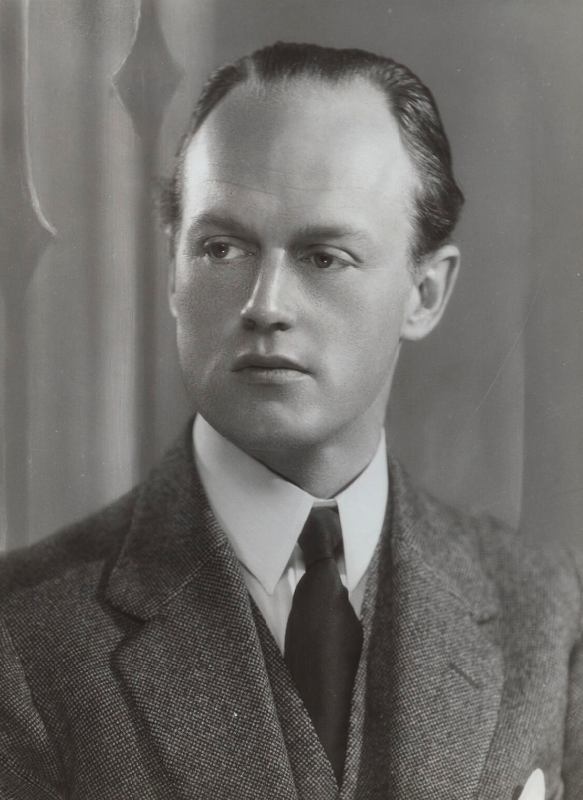
- Victor, Viscount Hinchingbrooke, in 1943

Member of Parliament for South Dorset
- In office 22 February 1941 – 15 June 1962
- Preceded by: Viscount Cranborne
- Succeeded by: Guy Barnett

Personal details
- Born: Alexander Victor Edward Paulet Montagu; 22 May 1906
- Died: 25 February 1995 (aged 88)
- Party: Conservative
- Spouses: Rosemary Peto (m. 1934; div. 1958) Lady Anne Holland-Martin (m. 1962; div. 1965)
- Children: 7
- Parent(s): George Montagu, 9th Earl of Sandwich (father); Alberta Sturges (mother)
- Education: Eton College
- Alma mater: Trinity College, Cambridge

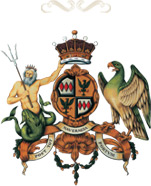
Coat of arms of the Earls of Sandwich

Alexander Victor Edward Paulet Montagu (22 May 1906 – 25 February 1995), known as Viscount Hinchingbrooke from 1916 to 1962, as the Earl of Sandwich from 1962 to 1964 (when he disclaimed his peerages), and as Victor Montagu from 1964 to 1995, was a British Conservative Member of Parliament (MP). He was usually known to family and friends as 'Hinch Hinchingbrooke' or 'Hinch Sandwich' or, later, as 'Hinch Montagu'. In 2015, it was revealed that he was cautioned for indecently assaulting a child for a period between 31 December 1970 and January 1972.

== Early life ==
Montagu was the eldest son of The 9th Earl of Sandwich and his wife, Alberta Sturges. He was an older brother of Lady Mary Faith Montagu and the novelist Lady Elizabeth Montagu. He was educated at Eton and Trinity College, Cambridge. In 1926, he joined the 5th (Huntingdonshire) Battalion, Northamptonshire Regiment, as a Lieutenant.

== Political career ==
A member of the Conservative Party, Lord Hinchingbrooke, as he then was, was Private Secretary to the Lord President of the Council, Stanley Baldwin, from 1932 to 1934 and Treasurer of the Junior Imperial League from 1934 to 1935.

He briefly served in France in 1940, during the Second World War. A year later, he was elected MP for South Dorset, replacing Viscount Cranborne, who was called up to the House of Lords. A radical backbencher, Lord Hinchingbrooke set up the Tory Reform Committee in 1943, and was its founding chairman until a year later. It was at this time he wrote Essays in Tory Reform, a response to the party's moves toward liberalism.

Hinchingbrooke was elected in the following five general elections, and continued as MP for South Dorset until 1962 when his father died. Viscount Hinchingbrooke succeeded to his father's titles and automatically joined the House of Lords, meaning he could no longer sit in the House of Commons, and as such resigned his seat.

Lord Sandwich, as he had become, disclaimed his peerages in 1964, however, under the Peerage Act 1963. As Victor Montagu, he unsuccessfully stood as the Conservative candidate at Accrington at the 1964 general election. Although he did not sit in the House of Commons again, Montagu was President of the Anti-Common Market League from 1962 to 1984; he also joined the Conservative Monday Club in 1964 and wrote The Conservative Dilemma in 1970.

== Personal life ==
Victor, Viscount Hinchingbrooke, married the artist Rosemary Peto (1916–1998), only daughter of Major Ralph Peto and a goddaughter of Queen Maud of Norway, on 27 July 1934; they were divorced in 1958, after they had seven children.

His youngest son, therapist Robert Montagu, has since alleged that his father sexually abused him on an almost daily basis from the ages of seven to eleven. In addition to his son's allegations of child sexual abuse, in 2015, Freedom of Information requests revealed that Victor Montagu "was let off with a caution by police and the director of public prosecutions in 1972 for indecently assaulting a boy for a duration of nearly two years".

Lord Hinchingbrooke was married a second time to Lady Anne Holland-Martin (née Cavendish), the youngest daughter of The 9th Duke of Devonshire, on 7 June 1962, but they were to divorce in 1965 (she became in the same year the mother-in-law of his daughter Lady Katherine, wife of her son Nicholas Hunloke). He succeeded as the 10th Earl of Sandwich upon his father's death on 15 June 1962, about a week after his second marriage. Lady Anne was the widow of Christopher Holland-Martin, MP, and the wife of Henry Hunloke, MP.

Montagu died in 1995, aged 88.

== Sources ==
- Burke's Peerage & Gentry

Parliament of the United Kingdom
Preceded by Viscount Cranborne	Member of Parliament for South Dorset; 1941–1962	Succeeded by Guy Barnett
Peerage of England
Preceded by George Montagu	Earl of Sandwich; 1962–1964	Disclaimed Title next held by John Montagu
