= HMS Pearl (1855) =

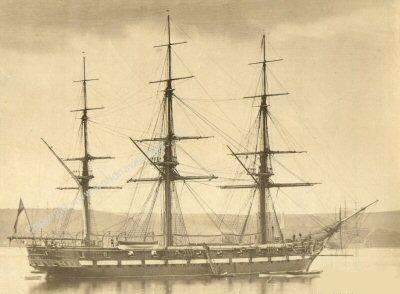
- HMS Pearl, about 1856

History

United Kingdom
- Name: HMS Pearl
- Builder: Woolwich Dockyard
- Launched: 13 September 1855
- Fate: Sold for break up to Castle, August 1884

General characteristics
- Class & type: Pearl-class corvette
- Displacement: 2,115 long tons (2,149 t)
- Tons burthen: 1469 bm
- Length: 225 ft 3 in (68.66 m) oa; 200 ft (61 m) (gundeck)
- Beam: 40 ft 4 in (12.29 m)
- Draught: 16 ft 2 in (4.93 m) (forward); 19 ft 9 in (6.02 m) (aft)
- Depth of hold: 23 ft 11 in (7.29 m)
- Installed power: 400 nominal horsepower; 1,324 ihp (987 kW)
- Propulsion: 2-cylinder trunk engine; Single screw
- Sail plan: Full-rigged ship
- Speed: 11.3 knots (20.9 km/h) (under steam)
- Armament: 20 × 8-inch (42 cwt) muzzle-loading smoothbore cannons on broadside trucks; 1 × 10-inch/68-pdr (95 cwt) muzzle-loading smoothbore cannons pivot-mounted at bow

HMS Pearl was a Pearl-class 21-gun screw corvette of the Royal Navy launched in 1855, displacing 2,187 tons.

In September 1857, during the Indian Rebellion, 175 of the ship's crew were formed into Pearl's Naval Brigade. The small force, armed largely with rifles, took part in several actions. It was accompanied in many of these by a similar force formed from the crew of Shannon.

The ship was captained by Edward Southwell Sotheby from its commission in 1855. John Borlase replaced Sotheby, on the ships return from India in 1859, from 23 August 1859 to 18 June 1864 when the ship was paid off in Portsmouth. Pearl sailed around the East Indies and China and played a part in the Taiping Rebellion and the bombardment of Kagoshima during the Anglo-Satsuma War.

== North Star affair ==
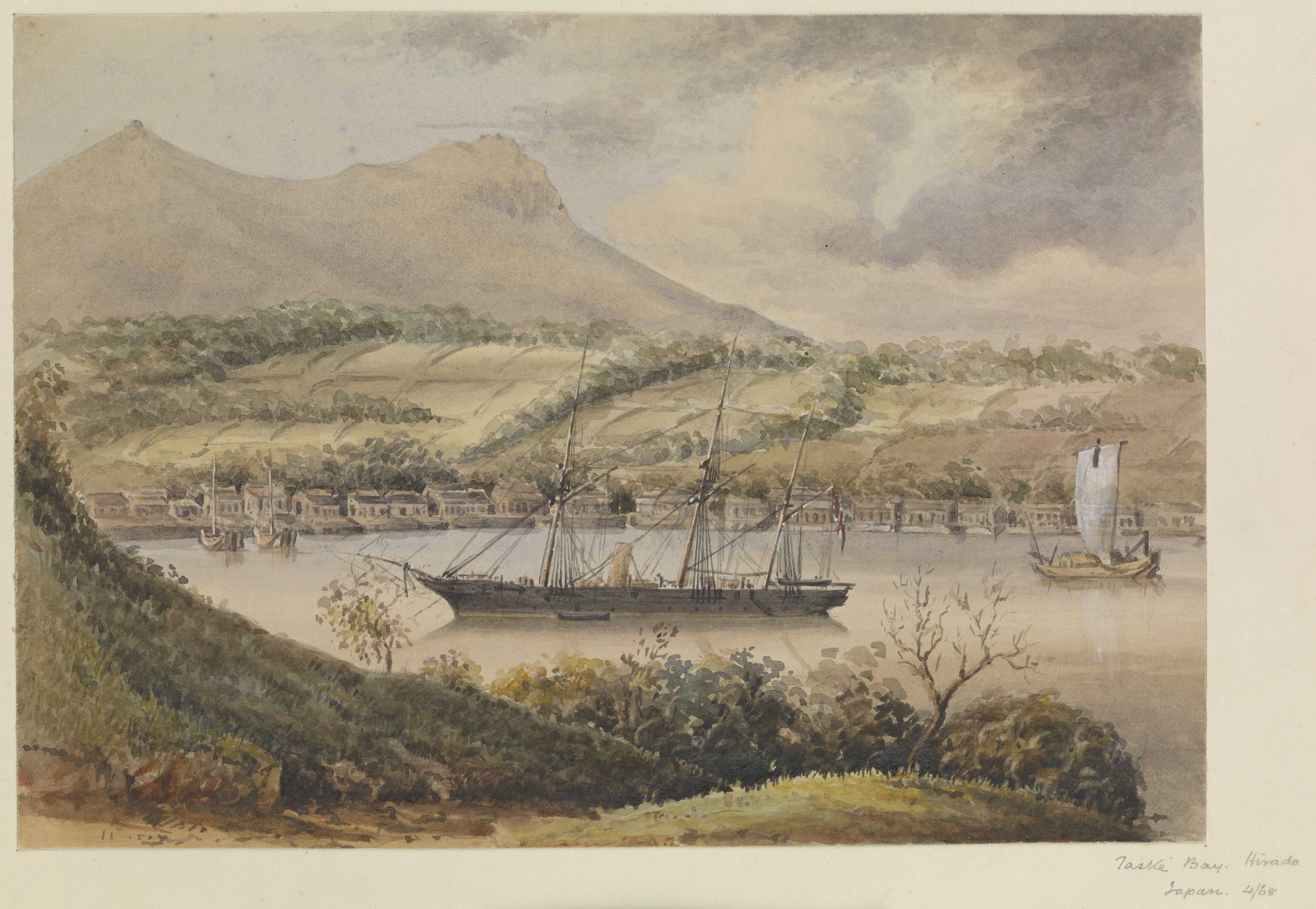
Pearl at Tasuke Bay, Hirado, Japan in 1868

In May 1861 the Pearl was involved in an incident involving a British merchant ship named North Star and Chinese pirates. On 13 May, pirates in a junk attacked North Star off the coast of Hong Kong Island. They killed or mortally wounded at least five members of the crew and stole over 4,000 dollars' worth of gold before abandoning the ship. Only two survivors remained on the ship. They hid from the pirates until they left North Star, and then set sail for the port of Hong Kong. Pearl was anchored off Green Island at the time and she eventually recovered both North Star and the survivors.
