= Josephine MacLeod =

American devotee of Swami Vivekananda

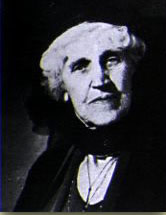
- MacLeod in 1939
- Born: 26 December 1858; Chicago, United States
- Died: 15 October 1949 (aged 90); Hollywood, California, United States
- Occupation: Religious activist
- Years active: 1895–1949
- Relatives: Betty Leggett (sister); Alberta Montagu, Countess of Sandwich (niece)

Josephine MacLeod (26 December 1858 – 15 October 1949) was an American friend and devotee of Swami Vivekananda. She had a strong attachment to India and was an active participant in the Ramakrishna Vivekananda movement. She was given the nicknames "Tantine" and "Jo Jo" by Vivekananda. She considered Swami Vivekananda to be her friend and helped him with his finances. MacLeod was not a sanyasin, unlike many others such as Sister Nivedita or Sister Christine. She was instrumental in spreading Vivekananda's message on Vedanta in the West. She made many contributions to the initial and later phases of the development of the order of Ramakrishna and Vivekananda. She was a contributor to many causes espoused by Sister Nivedita, the most famous disciple of Vivekananda, including that of contributing financially towards the development of the Indian National Movement especially in Bengal and elsewhere in India.

== Life ==
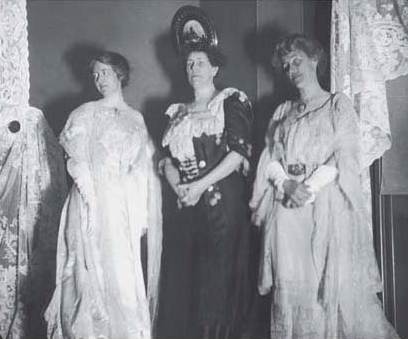
Olea Bull, Betty Leggett and Josephine MacLeod at the Holdts Hotel, Bergon, Norway after dinner with King Haarkon VII and Queen Maud on July 23, 1906

=== Early life ===
Josephine was born on 26 December 1858, on Boxing Day, in Chicago to John David MacLeod and Mary Ann Lennon. Her father was of Scottish descent. The couple had three sons and three daughters. Two of their daughters, Betty (1852–1931) and Josephine (1858–1949), became disciples of Swami Vivekananda. Betty married Mr. William Sturges of Chicago in 1876 and had a son named Hollister and a daughter named Alberta, who were also intimately connected with the Vedanta Societies and Ramakrishna order. Being unmarried herself, Josephine stayed with Betty and her family. After the death of William Sturges in 1894, Betty married Francis Legett, a businessman of New York, in 1895. Swami Vivekananda attended this marriage in Paris. Ridgely Manor, which later became famous as one of the places to accommodate Swami Vivekananda during his travel to Americas and Europe in 1899, belonged to the Legett family. She was known by several other nicknames, including Joe, Jo-Jo, Yum and Tantine (meaning "Aunty").

=== Relationship with Swami Vivekananda ===
Josephine and her sister Betty first heard Swami Vivekananda's lecture on Vedanta philosophy in New York City on 29 January 1895. Their friend R. Dora Roetheslesberger had told them about Vivekananda. They had assembled in the sitting room of Vivekananda's apartment, along with many other women and a few men. His lecture impressed her, and she observed at the end of the lecture that the way he presented truth was something unique. She heard his lectures several times over the next seven years. The meeting with Swami Vivekananda and her association with him for the remaining periods of his life in America and India was the most important event in her life according to her. She was deeply impressed and thereby began to cultivate a relationship which would be long lasting and significant for her.

MacLeod became a member of the Vedanta Society established by Vivekananda and pursued the study and practice of Vedanta. This interaction gave her a different perspective of living in "eternity". Vivekananda noted "I simply adore Joe (Josephine MacLeod) in her tact and quiet way. She is a feminine statesman or woman. She can wield a kingdom. I have seldom seen such strong yet good common sense in a human being." MacLeod considered the propagation of Swamiji's message of Indian spirituality in the West as a responsibility.

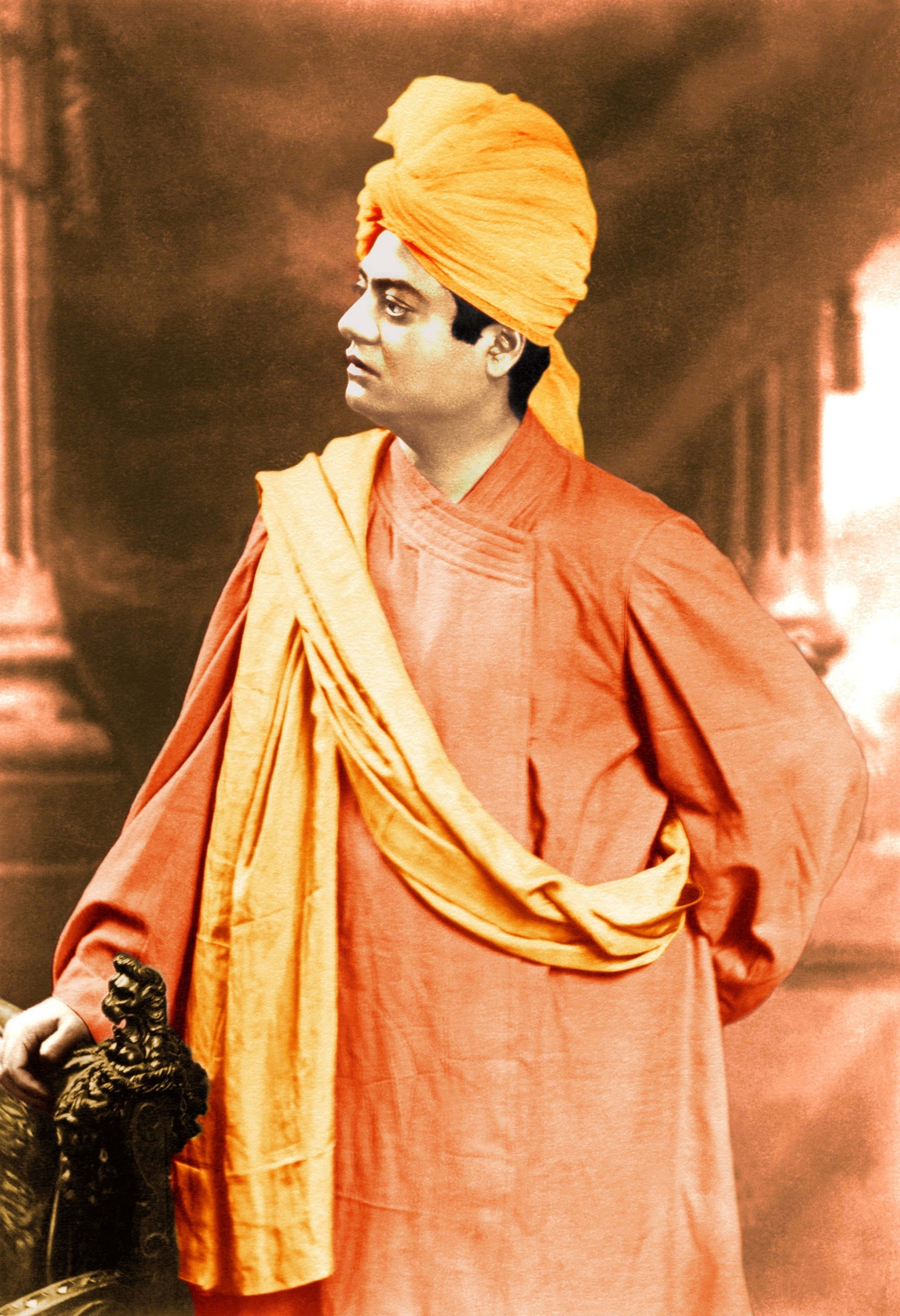
Swami Vivekananda in London in 1896.

MacLeod was 35 years old when she met Swamiji. She considered the day she met Vivekananda for the first time, 29 January 1895, to be her "spiritual birthday". She said, "It is the Truth that I saw in Swamiji that has set me free; it was to set me free that Swamiji came." As a result of her constant interaction with Vivekananda during his lectures on Vedanta, her devotion to his teachings became so profound that she believed that he was the "New Buddha" and even called him "Our Prophet."

MacLeod did not like anyone addressing her as Vivekananda's disciple and would immediately retort that she was his friend. Her niece, later Lady Sandwich, remarked that she was not Swami's friend but "Him". Vivekananda held her in great esteem and would write to her on his inner feelings, which he did not share with anyone else, including the brother monks or his "Madras Boys". He noted in one letter that "I can't even in imagination pay the immense debt of gratitude I owe you." On issues of conflict between the British in India and the Belur Math in Calcutta, she intervened with officials in the British Government in England to resolve the issues.

When she was in London when Vivekananda was also lecturing there in 1896, the best fruit of every season was delivered to him from an anonymous person. The firm of William Whitley, a popular fruit dealer in London, had been paid for such delivery by an anonymous benefactor. Pineapple, a rare fruit in London which was valued at a quarter per fruit, was delivered to him every day. The benefactor was thought to be MacLeod, as she was in London when the fruit delivery started.

She defended Vivekananda's religious ethos when, during her visit to India with him, she stated that "our Swamiji's great exposition of Vedanta Philosophy always favoured than denied the mission of Christ, and left Christians better Christians..." Because MacLeod's efforts in the US and the West were so strong, Swamiji named her a "lady missionary" of the Ramakrishna Order promoted by Vivekananda.

MacLeod had asked Swmi Vivekananda if she would accompany him to India. His response was, "Yes, come, if you want filth and degradation and poverty and many loin cloths talking religion. Don't come if you want anything else. We cannot bear one more criticism." She went to India and, on being asked what she could do for him (Swami Vivekananda), the latter replied gravely, "Love India".

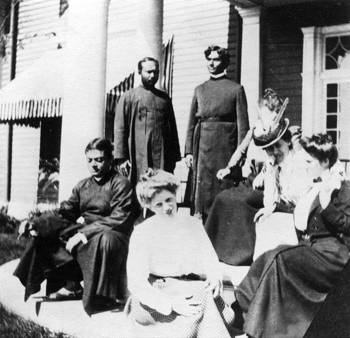
Sitting (left to right): Swami Vivekananda, Alberta Sturges, Besse Leggett (hidden), Josephine MacLeod

Recalling the Swami's lecture on the Bhagavad Gita, the foremost of the Hindu scriptures, sometime in 1895, she was quoted as saying, later: I saw with these very eyes (she pointed to her own eyes) Krishna himself standing there and preaching the Gita. That was my first wonderful vision. I stared and stared. . . .I saw only the figure and all else vanished. In 1898, she visited India and traveled with Swami Vivekananda to North India including Almora, Kashmir and parts of Punjab. When in India she used to stay in Belur Math, in the old house along with Sara Bull. She took every possible care of the Swami when he arrived in New York for the second time in 1899 while he stayed in Ridgely Manor or elsewhere in America. Capt. Sevier, who, along with his wife Charlotte Sevier, became disciple of Swami Vivekananda after attending the latter's lectures in London and who established the Advaita Ashrama in Mayawati, had consulted first Miss Macleod on her impression about Vivekananda In 1900, Macleod traveled with Swami Vivekananda he visited Paris to participate in the Congress of History of Religions, accompanied by Emma Calve, Père Hyacynthe and Jules Bois. The team traveled through south West Europe to Constantinople, Athens and, finally, to Cairo from where Swami returned to India.

=== Depression and new beginnings ===
Following Vivekananda's death in 1902, MacLeod went into depression for two years, after which she devoted the next four decades to the cause of promoting the Vedantic ethos of the Swamiji. In his last letter to her, Vivekenanda wrote, "You have been a good angel to me". In a previous letter, he had written, "and to you, dear Joe, Pranams." Even after the death of Vivekananda, Macleod remained in touch with the Ramakrishna Order and often visited the Belur Math headquarters of the Order and stayed for many days.

Macleod was also very close to Sister Nivedita, the disciple of Swami Vivekananda, who dedicated her life towards education of Indian women and towards the cause of revival of Indian Nationalism. She travelled to Japan and introduced Kakuzo Okakura, the art historian, and Prince Oda, a Buddhist Abbot, to Vivekananda.

She provided the initial funding of $800 for the establishment of the Udbodhan press, which was used to publish the Udbodhan Patrika, a monthly Bengali magazine of the Ramakrishna Order.

Macleod also helped the Ramakrishna Mission in tiding over political crises. In December 1916, Lord Carmichael, the then Lt-Governor of Bengal, made a statement casting aspersions on Ramakrishna Mission. Ramakrishna Math and Mission was always under close surveillance by the government because of the alleged involvement of some of its monks in nationalist activities like involvement with the Anushilan Samity during the Partition of Bengal before they renounced the world, and also because Swami Vivekananda's fiery speeches and ideals inspired many freedom fighters like Aurobindo Ghosh. Swami Saradananda, the secretary of Ramakrishna Mission, under the advice of the Holy Mother Sri Sarada Devi, met the governor who subsequently retracted his statement. However, Ramakrishna Mission was helped by the high level contacts that Macleod had, to form a favorable opinion in government circles.

She also persuaded Swami Nityatmananda, a close associate of Mahendranath Gupta or M, the author of The Gospel of Sri Ramakrishna, to publish the viewpoints of M on Swami Vivekananda, which later appeared in the fifth volume of the Ramakrishna Kathamrita, the original Bengali version of the Gospel, as an appendix.

She was in touch with many contemporary intellectuals, including George Bernard Shaw and Romain Rolland. She helped extensively in spreading the message of Vedanta and Swami Vivekananda's teachings in particular in various European languages including German. Macleod also worked extensively for the cause of advancement of education of women in India, through her regular financial contribution to the school found and run by Sister Nivedita.

The French scholar and Nobel Laureate Romain Rolland wrote of Macleod, "(She) never tires of pointing out his (Vivekananda's) beauty, his charm, the power of attraction which was radiating from him."

She helped in conducting the first centenary celebration of the birth of Sri Ramakrishna in Calcutta in 1937.

Even though closely affiliated with an organization which took a leading role in Hindu renaissance, she remained a Christian in faith. In her own words, she had become a better Christian through the influence of Vivekananda.

== Death ==
MacLeod died in California on 15 October 1949. At the time of her death, she was living at the Vedanta Society of Southern California's center in Hollywood.

== Books ==
- Tantine: The Life and Times of Josephine MacLeod, by Pravrajika Prabhuddhaprana
- Josephine Macleod And Vivekananda's Mission, by Linda Prugh, publisher Sri Ramakrishna Math, Chennai, ISBN 8171208517
- Swami Vivekananda in the West: New Discoveries – By Marie Louise Burke (Advaita Ashrama, Kolkata)
- Letters of Sister Nivedita – Edited by Prof. Sankari Prasad Basu (Nababharat Publishers, Calcutta, April 1982)
