= Hinchingbrooke House =

Building in Huntingdon, Cambridgeshire

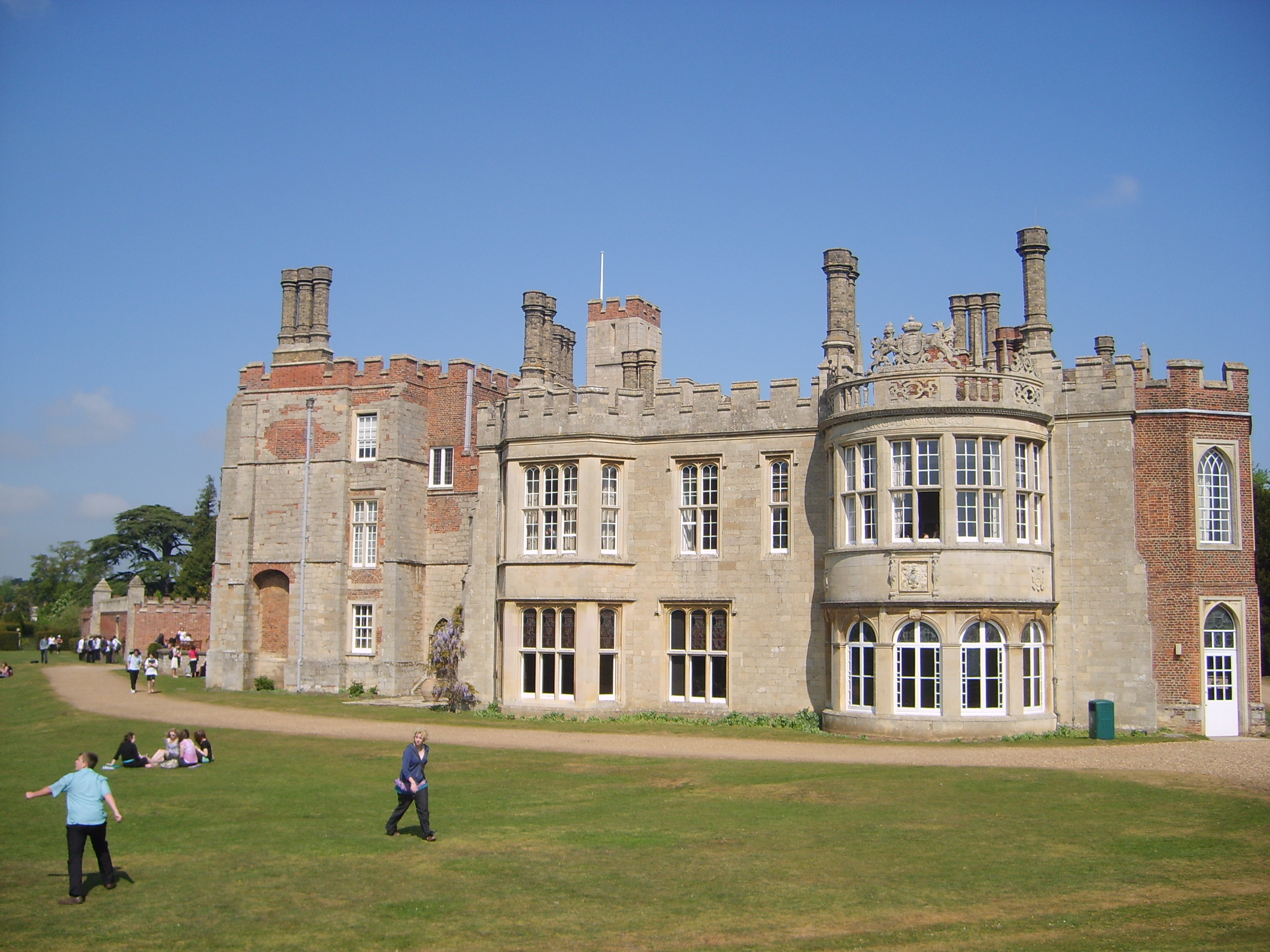
- Hinchingbrooke House (2007).

- Location within Cambridgeshire

General information
- Type: House
- Location: England
- Coordinates: 52.3286°N 0.2014°W
- Construction started: 11th century
- Owner: Hinchingbrooke School

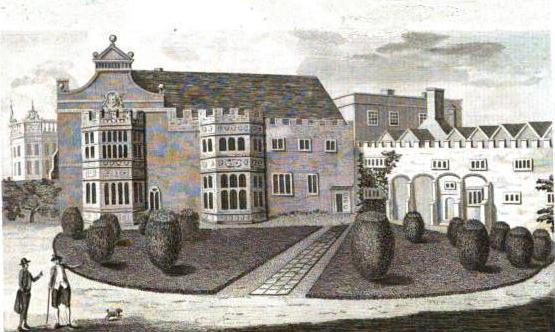
North front of Hinchingbrooke House (1787).

Hinchingbrooke House is an English stately home in Huntingdon, Cambridgeshire, now part of Hinchingbrooke School.

The house was built around an 11th-century Benedictine nunnery. After the Reformation it passed into the hands of the Cromwell family, and subsequently became the home of the Earls of Sandwich, including John Montagu, 4th Earl of Sandwich, reputedly the "inventor" of the modern sandwich. In 1962 it was sold by the 10th Earl of Sandwich, per a son, the 11th Earl of Sandwich, who was born and raised at Hinchingbrooke House.

On 8 March 1538, Richard Williams (alias Cromwell), a nephew of Thomas Cromwell, had the grant of the nunnery of Hinchingbrooke, in Huntingdonshire, for the undervalued price of £19.9s.2d. while he was an official Visitor overseeing the dissolution of the monasteries. A fireplace discovered in the building has his initials. His son, Henry Williams (alias Cromwell), grandfather of Oliver Cromwell, carried out more extensive works on the house.

According to Mark Noble, an eighteenth-century writer and frequent visitor at Hinchingbrooke, "The nuns' apartments, or cells, at Hinchinbrook, are now entire, and are used as lodging-rooms for the menial servants; their common room was what is now the kitchen; the church is destroyed, except some trifling remains, now part of one of the walls of the house, and seem to have been the corner of the tower; near this place in lowering the flooring, a few years ago, one or more coffins of stone were found", and "On the bow windows he put the arms of his family, with those of several others to whom he was allied".

Queen Elizabeth stayed at Hinchingbrooke in August 1564 after entertainments at Cambridge University. King James came to Hinchingbrooke on 27 April 1603 and Sir Oliver Cromwell gave him hawks, horses, hounds, and a gold cup. The king was back on 7 December 1610, and Prince Henry stayed on 8 August 1612.

There was a serious fire in 1830 and the house was restored/rebuilt by Edward Blore. It was further restored in 1894 and again in the 1960s. During the most recent restoration the entrance to the chapter house was discovered, but otherwise little of the medieval fabric is visible.

The house was featured and illustrated in the 2 November 1907 issue of Country Life.

In 1970, it became part of Hinchingbrooke School, housing the 6th form. Hinchingbrooke School was formerly Huntingdon Grammar School which, on the site of what is now the Cromwell Museum in Huntingdon, was attended by Oliver Cromwell and Samuel Pepys. The school now has around 1,900 pupils.

More recently, while still being used as a school, Hinchingbrooke House is turned into a critically acclaimed scare attraction in the Halloween season called "The Horror at Hinchingbrooke House". It is also used as a conference centre, for dinner dances, and as a wedding venue. It is a Grade I listed building and is open for tours on Sunday afternoons in the summer season.
