= Countess of Sandwich =

Countess of Sandwich is a British noble title that has been held by the following spouses of the Earls of Sandwich:

- Elizabeth Montagu, Countess of Sandwich (1674-1757), spouse of Edward Montagu, 3rd Earl of Sandwich.
- Dorothy Montagu, Countess of Sandwich (1716/17-1797), spouse of John Montagu, 4th Earl of Sandwich.
- Louisa Montagu, Countess of Sandwich (1781-1862), spouse of George Montagu, 6th Earl of Sandwich.
- Alberta Montagu, Countess of Sandwich (1877-1951), spouse of George Montagu, 9th Earl of Sandwich.
- Caroline Montagu, Countess of Sandwich (1951-), spouse of John Montagu, 11th Earl of Sandwich.
- Julie Montagu, Countess of Sandwich (1972-), spouse of Luke Montagu, 12th Earl of Sandwich.
