= Lionel Walden (c. 1653 – 1701) =

Lionel Walden (c. 1653 – 15 April 1701), of Huntingdon, was an English soldier and Member of Parliament.

Walden was born around 1653, the only son of Sir Lionel Walden and Elizabeth Balaam. He was admitted to Trinity College, Cambridge as a fellow commoner on 3 July 1671, and later transferred to Corpus Christi. Travelling abroad in 1673, he returned to spend a year as a captain in the Earl of Northampton's foot regiment, before being admitted to the Inner Temple on 27 November 1675.

In October 1679, Walden was elected to represent Huntingdon in the House of Commons and retained his seat in the elections of 1681 and 1685. He was a supporter of James II and raised an independent troop of horse during the Monmouth Rebellion. He remained a Jacobite after the Glorious Revolution, and was arrested in 1690 but released after the intercession of Lord Nottingham. He died on 15 April 1701, and was buried at All Saints' Church, Huntingdon.

Walden was married, at some date after 1684, to Elizabeth daughter of Sir John Cotton. They had three sons and two daughters, though two of the sons died before their father. The surviving son fought for James Francis Edward Stuart in the Jacobite rising of 1715 and died unmarried in 1719.

Parliament of England
Preceded by Sidney Wortley-Montagu; Nicholas Pedley	Member of Parliament for Huntingdon; 1679–1689; With: Sidney Wortley-Montagu 1679–1685; Oliver Montagu 1685–1689	Succeeded by John Bigg; Sidney Wortley-Montagu
