= Edward Montagu, 2nd Earl of Sandwich =

English aristocrat and politician

The Right Honourable The Earl of Sandwich

Member of Parliament for Dover
- In office 1670–1672 Serving with George Montagu
- Preceded by: George Montagu; Sir Francis Vincent, Bt
- Succeeded by: George Montagu; Sir Edward Spragge

Personal details
- Born: Edward Montagu; 3 January 1647 Huntingdonshire, England
- Died: 29 November 1688 (aged 40)
- Spouse: Lady Anne Boyle (m. 1667; died 1671)
- Children: 3
- Parent(s): Edward Montagu, 1st Earl of Sandwich; Hon. Jemima Crew
- Relatives: Sidney Montagu (brother); John Montagu (brother); Walter Montagu (cousin); Sidney Montagu (grandfather); John Crew, 1st Baron Crew (grandfather)

Edward Montagu, 2nd Earl of Sandwich (3 January 1647/48 – 29 November 1688) was an English aristocrat and politician.

== Early life ==
Montagu was born in Hinchinbrooke, Huntingdonshire, England on 3 January 1647/48. He was a son of the former Hon. Jemima Crew and Edward Montagu, 1st Earl of Sandwich, the Ambassador of the Kingdom of England to Portugal. Among his many siblings were Hon. Sidney Montagu, Hon. John Montagu (the Dean of Durham), Lady Jemima Montagu (who married Sir Philip Carteret), Lady Anne Montagu (who married Sir Richard Edgecumbe), and Lady Catherine Montagu (who married Nicholas Bacon).

His father was the only surviving son and heir of Sir Sidney Montagu of Hinchingbrooke Master of Requests and, his first wife, Pauline Pepys (third daughter of John Pepys of Cottenham). Montagu's grandfather was a younger brother of Henry Montagu, 1st Earl of Manchester. His maternal grandparents were John Crew, 1st Baron Crew and the former Jemima Waldegrave (a daughter and co-heiress of Joan and Edward Waldegrave of Lawford Hall). Among his maternal relatives included uncles Thomas Crew, 2nd Baron Crew and Nathaniel Crew, 3rd Baron Crew (the Bishop of Durham) and aunt Anne Crew, who married Sir Henry Wright, 1st Baronet of Dagenham.

He was educated mainly in Paris, where he lived with his cousin Walter Montagu, although he is said "not to have been much of a scholar". After Montagu's father was raised to the peerage as the Earl of Sandwich in 1660, Edward was styled Viscount Hinchingbrooke until his accession as the 2nd Earl in 1672. From 1661 to 1664, he travelled in France and from 1664 to 1665, he travelled in Italy.

== Career ==
From 1670, until his succession to the earldom in 1672, he was a Member of Parliament for Dover, serving alongside George Montagu. After he left the House of Commons, his seat was taken over by Sir Edward Spragge.

In 1681, Edward was to be appointed Lord Lieutenant of Huntingdonshire upon his return from abroad, but he never took up the office, which was exercised successively by Robert Bruce, 1st Earl of Ailesbury and Thomas Bruce, 2nd Earl of Ailesbury. The 1st Earl also exercised for him, in the same fashion, the office of Lord Lieutenant of Cambridgeshire in 1685, but the appointment was rescinded after Ailesbury's death the same year.

His father's biographer described him as "a steady, not very robust young man, who would never set the Thames alight". Edward's brief marriage to Anne Boyle seems to have been happy enough: his mother had a warm regard for her daughter-in-law.

== Personal life ==
Viscount Hinchingbrooke was betrothed to Elizabeth Malet (the daughter of John Mallet of Enmore Manor and heiress to his great fortune). The engagement was broken off at her request: she later married John Wilmot, 2nd Earl of Rochester. It was said that she found Edward "unexciting"; historians have remarked that she is likely to have found far more excitement than she could have wished for with Rochester, who was probably the most debauched rakehell of his era.

=== Marriage and issue ===
In January 1667, Montagu was married to Lady Anne Boyle, daughter of Richard Boyle, 2nd Earl of Cork and Lady Elizabeth Clifford, suo jure Baroness Clifford, as the only surviving child of Henry Clifford, 5th Earl of Cumberland. Among Lady Anne's siblings were Charles Boyle, 3rd Viscount Dungarvan, Richard Boyle (who died before they married at the Battle of Lowestoft), Lady Frances Boyle (wife of Wentworth Dillon, 4th Earl of Roscommon), Lady Elizabeth Boyle (wife of Nicholas Tufton, 3rd Earl of Thanet), and Lady Henrietta Boyle (wife of Lawrence Hyde, 1st Earl of Rochester). Together, they had three children:

- Edward Montagu, 3rd Earl of Sandwich (1670–1729), who married Lady Elizabeth Wilmot, daughter of the Earl of Rochester, in 1689.
- Hon. Richard Montagu (1671–1697), who became a Member of Parliament for Huntingdon.
- Hon. Elizabeth Montagu, who died unmarried.

His wife, Lady Anne died in 1671. Lord Sandwich died on 29 November 1688. Their eldest Edward, who inherited the Earldom, is generally considered to have been insane. There is no evidence that the condition was hereditary, although the first Earl seems to have suffered from depression in his later years.

Parliament of England
Preceded by George Montagu; Sir Francis Vincent, Bt	Member of Parliament for Dover; 1670–1672; With: George Montagu	Succeeded by George Montagu; Sir Edward Spragge
Peerage of England
Preceded by Edward Montagu	Earl of Sandwich; 1672–1688	Succeeded by Edward Montagu
