= An American Aristocrat's Guide to Great Estates =

Factual television-based documentary

An American Aristocrat's Guide to Great Estates is a factual documentary television series commissioned by the Smithsonian Channel. It is presented by Julie Montagu, Countess of Sandwich, at the time of production, Viscountess Hinchingbrooke, the American wife of Viscount Hinchingbrooke (currently the Luke Montagu, 12th Earl of Sandwich), and explores the histories, management styles and upkeep costs of Britain's family mansions and castles.

Although initially recommissioned for a second series, it was subsequently cancelled due to a change at the top of the Smithsonian Channel. This resulted in Julie Montagu setting up a production company and through the Patreon crowdfunding platform, developing a new show called American Viscountess (later American Countess) for YouTube.

== Episodes ==
Series one, comprising ten episodes was aired between May and December 2020.

1. 17 May 2020: Inveraray Castle

2. 24 May 2020: Floors Castle

3. 31 May 2020: Holdenby House

4. 7 June 2020: Boughton House

5. 14 June 2020: Doddington Hall

6. 21 June 2020: Sudeley Castle

7. 28 June 2020: Newby Hall

8. 5 July 2020: Eastnor Castle

9. 1 December 2020: Mapperton

10. 8 December 2020: Christmas at Mapperton
