= Sir Robert Bernard, 1st Baronet =

English lawyer and politician

Sir Robert Bernard, 1st Baronet (1601–1666) was an English lawyer and politician who sat in the House of Commons in 1640.

Bernard was born at Kingsthorpe, Northamptonshire, the son of Francis Bernard, whose family had held the manor of Abington, Northamptonshire, for 200 years, and his wife Mary Woodhouse. He was admitted at the Middle Temple on 13 November 1615. He was Recorder of Huntingdon.

In April 1640, Bernard was elected Member of Parliament for Huntingdon in the Short Parliament.

Samuel Pepys consulted him in 1661 about the bitter inheritance dispute over the nearby estate of Brampton, Cambridgeshire (Bernard as Lord of the Manor of Brampton was also Steward of the Manorial Court), which Samuel's uncle Robert had bequeathed to him, but which several other heirs also laid claim to. The following year he persuaded Samuel and his father to reach a compromise settlement with Samuel's uncle Thomas, who had claimed the Brampton property as his brother Robert's heir-at-law.

Samuel liked both Bernard and his second wife Elizabeth Digby, and he later became friendly with Bernard's younger son William. Samuel's cousin and patron Edward Montagu, 1st Earl of Sandwich disliked Bernard: his attitude was no doubt influenced by the bitter political feud between the Montagu and Bernard families for political control of Huntingdonshire. It was Sandwich who had Bernard dismissed from his Recordership in 1663. Samuel was concerned that despite their previous friendly relations this would cause Bernard to hold a grudge against him, due to his closeness to Sandwich.

Bernard was Counsel for Cambridge University in 1646 and steward and judge of the Court of the Isle of Ely in 1649. He was a serjeant-at-law and was created a baronet, of Huntingdon on 1 July 1662.

Bernard died in his 66th year and was buried in the north aisle of Abington Church, Northamptonshire where there is a monument to him.

Bernard married firstly Elizabeth Tallakerne, daughter of Sir John Tallakerne of Ashen Hall, Essex. Their children included John, William, a grocer in London, and Lucy who married Sir Nicholas Pedley, MP for Huntingdon. Bernard married secondly Lady Elizabeth Digby, daughter of Sir James Altham, Baron of the Exchequer and Mary Stapers, and widow of Robert Digby, 1st Baron Digby. She died in 1662 and was buried at St Paul's Covent Garden.

Parliament of England
| Parliament suspended since 1629 | Member of Parliament for Huntingdon; 1640; With: William Montagu | Succeeded by George Montagu; Abraham Burrell |
Baronetage of England
| New creation | Baronet (of Huntingdon); 1662–1666 | Succeeded by John Bernard |
