= Lionel Walden (disambiguation) =

Lionel Walden (1861–1933), American painter.

Lionel Walden may also refer to:

- Lionel Walden (1620–1698), MP for Huntingdon 1661 and Huntingdonshire 1685
- Lionel Walden (c. 1653 – 1701), his son, MP for Huntingdon 1679–1689
