= Bernard baronets of Huntingdon (1662) =

The Bernard baronetcy, of Huntingdon in the County of Huntingdon, was created in the Baronetage of England on 1 July 1662 for Robert Bernard, who represented Huntingdon in the House of Commons. His son, the 2nd Baronet, and grandson, the 3rd Baronet, also represented this constituency in parliament. The latter's grandson, the 5th Baronet, sat as Member of Parliament for Huntingdon and Westminster. On his death in 1789 the baronetcy became extinct.

== Bernard baronets, of Huntingdon (1662) ==
- Sir Robert Bernard, 1st Baronet (1601–1666)
- Sir John Bernard, 2nd Baronet (1630–1679)
- Sir Robert Bernard, 3rd Baronet (died c. 1703)
- Sir John Bernard, 4th Baronet (c. 1695–1766)
- Sir Robert Bernard, 5th Baronet (c. 1740–1789)
