= Sir Francis Vincent, 3rd Baronet =

English politician

Sir Francis Vincent, 3rd Baronet (c. 1621 – 1670) was an English politician who sat in the House of Commons from 1661 to 1670.

Vincent was born in Devon, the son of Sir Anthony Vincent, 2nd Baronet of Stoke d'Abernon. He matriculated at Exeter College, Oxford, on 12 May 1637, aged 16. He succeeded to the Baronetcy on the death of his father in 1642. In 1661, he was elected Member of Parliament for Dover in the Cavalier Parliament.

Vincent died at the age of about 48.

Vincent married firstly, in or before 1645, Catharine Pitt, daughter of George Pitt, Serjeant at Law of Harrow-on-the-Hill, Middlesex. She died on 16 February 1654 and was buried at Stoke d'Abernon. He married secondly, Elizabeth Vane, daughter of Sir Henry Vane of Hadlow, Kent and his wife Frances Darcy, daughter of Thomas Darcy, of Essex.

Parliament of England
Preceded by George Montagu; Arnold Braemes	Member of Parliament for Dover; 1661; With: George Montagu	Succeeded by George Montagu; Lord Hinchingbrooke
Baronetage of England
Preceded by Anthony Vincent	Baronet (of Stoke d'Abernon); 1642–1670	Succeeded by Anthony Vincent
