= Henry Cromwell-Williams =

English politician

Henry Cromwell-Williams (22 June 1625 – 3 August 1673) of Bodsey House, Huntingdonshire was an English politician who sat in the House of Commons variously between 1654 and 1673.

Cromwell-Williams was born as Cromwell, the son of Henry Cromwell (1586–1657) of Ramsey, Huntingdonshire. He matriculated from Magdalene College, Cambridge. He succeeded to his father's Ramsey estate in 1657 but sold it in 1664.

In 1654, Cromwell was elected Member of Parliament for Huntingdonshire in the First Protectorate Parliament. He was re-elected in 1656 for the Second Protectorate Parliament and in 1659 for the Third Protectorate Parliament.

In 1660, he took the name Williams to become Cromwell-Williams. He was elected MP for Huntingdonshire in the Convention Parliament and was re-elected in 1661 for the Cavalier Parliament. He sat until his death in 1673 at the age of 48.

He was a Gentleman of the Privy Chamber from 1671 until his death.

Cromwell-Williams married his cousin Anne Cromwell, the daughter of Richard Cromwell of Upwood, but had no children.

Parliament of England
Preceded by Edward Montagu; Stephen Pheasant	Member of Parliament for Huntingdonshire; 1654–1659; With: Edward Montagu 1654–1656; Stephen Pheasant 1654; Nicholas Pedley 1656–1659	Succeeded by Restored Rump parliament
