= Sir John Bernard, 2nd Baronet =

English politician (1630–1679)

Sir John Bernard, 2nd Baronet (November 1630 – 25 June 1679) was an English politician who sat in the House of Commons between 1654 and 1660.

Bernard was born at Northampton, the son of Sir Robert Bernard, 1st Baronet and his first wife Elizabeth Tallakerne, daughter of Sir John Tallakerne. His father had been MP for Huntingdon in 1640. Bernard was educated at Huntingdon and was admitted at Middle Temple on 21 January 1645 and at Christ's College, Cambridge on 12 April 1646.

In 1654 Bernard was elected Member of Parliament for Huntingdon in the First Protectorate Parliament. He was re-elected in 1656 for the Second Protectorate Parliament and in 1659 for the Third Protectorate Parliament. In 1660, he was re-elected MP for Huntingdon in the Convention Parliament. Bernard succeeded to the baronetcy on the death of his father in 1666. As lord of the manor, he made himself highly unpopular, using his legal knowledge to eject small freeholders from their property.

Bernard died at the age of 48 and was buried at Brampton church, Northamptonshire, where he is commemorated on a marble monument, against the south wall.

Bernard married firstly Elizabeth St John, daughter of Oliver St John, Lord Chief Justice of the Common Pleas, by whom he had one son, Robert, his successor, and eight daughters, of whom Joanna, the fifth, married the Rev. Dr. Richard Bentley, archdeacon and prebendary of Ely, and master of Trinity College, Cambridge. Her portrait, by William Wissing, is in the College's collection.

Bernard married secondly Grace Shuckburgh, daughter of Sir Richard Shuckburgh, of Shuckburgh, Warwickshire and his wife Grace Holte, daughter of Sir Thomas Holte, 1st Baronet. They had no children. After his death, she married secondly Thomas Mariet. She died in 1721.

Parliament of England
Preceded by Not represented in Barebones Parliament	Member of Parliament for Huntingdon; 1654–1660; With: John Thurloe 1659; Nicholas Pedley 1660	Succeeded by Sir John Cotton, 3rd Bt; Lionel Walden
Baronetage of England
Preceded by Robert Bernard	Baronet (of Huntingdon); 1666–1679	Succeeded by Robert Bernard
