= George Montagu (17th century politician) =

English politician

George Montagu (28 July 1622 – July 1681) was an English politician who sat in the House of Commons at various times between 1640 and 1679.

== Biography ==
Montagu was born at Westminster, the son of Henry Montagu, 1st Earl of Manchester. He was at school in Amersham, Buckinghamshire, under Dr Croke and was admitted at Christ's College, Cambridge, on 21 March 1639. He was awarded MA in 1640 and admitted at the Middle Temple in the same year.

In November 1640, Montagu was elected Member of Parliament for Huntingdon in the Long Parliament and sat until 1648.

In August 1660, Montagu was elected MP for Dover in the Convention Parliament. In 1661 he was re-elected MP for Dover in the Cavalier Parliament and sat until 1679. He was Master of the Hospital of St Katharine-by-the-Tower, London, from 1661 to 1681.

Montagu married Elizabeth Irby, daughter of Sir Anthony Irby. His sons included Edward Montagu (MP), James Montagu (judge), Irby Montagu, MP and Charles Montagu, 1st Earl of Halifax.

Montagu died in 1681 and was buried at St Katharine-by-the-Tower in July.

Parliament of England
Preceded by Robert Bernard; William Montagu	Member of Parliament for Huntingdon; 1640–1648; With: Edward Montagu 1640–1644; Abraham Burrell 1645–1648	Succeeded by Abraham Burrell
Preceded by Edward Montagu; Sir Arnold Braemes	Member of Parliament for Dover; 1660–1679; With: Sir Arnold Braemes 1660–1661; Sir Francis Vincent, Bt 1661–1670; Edward Montagu 1670–1673; Adm. Sir Edward Spragge 1673–1674; Thomas Papillon 1674–1679	Succeeded by William Stokes; Thomas Papillon
