= Julie Montagu, Countess of Sandwich =

American-British entrepreneur (born 1972)

The Right Honourable The Countess of Sandwich
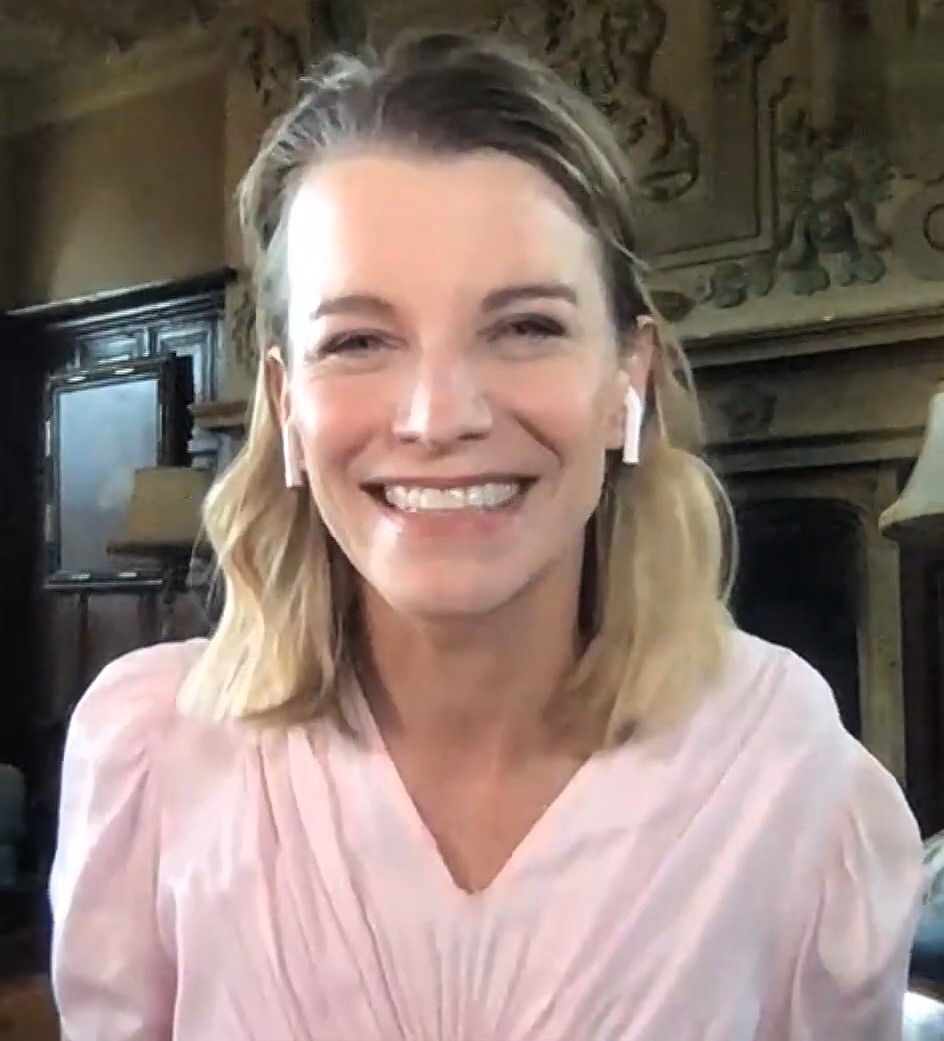
- Montagu in 2022
- Born: Julie Jean Fisher; February 17, 1972 (age 54); Sugar Grove, Illinois, U.S.
- Education: Indiana University; University of Buckingham
- Occupations: Entrepreneur, yoga instructor, television host
- Television: Ladies of London; An American Aristocrat's Guide to Great Estates; American Countess
- Spouse: Luke Montagu, 12th Earl of Sandwich (m. 2004)
- Children: 4
- Father: Thomas L. Fisher
- Relatives: John Montagu, 11th Earl of Sandwich (father-in-law); Caroline Montagu, Countess of Sandwich (mother-in-law)
- Family: House of Montagu (by marriage)

Julie Montagu, Countess of Sandwich (née Julie Jean Fisher; born February 17, 1972), styled as Viscountess Hinchingbrooke from 2004 to 2025, is an American entrepreneur, yoga instructor, writer, and television personality. She is married to Luke Montagu, 12th Earl of Sandwich. Montagu began her television career as a cast member on the British reality series Ladies of London before hosting her own series on the Smithsonian Channel called An American Aristocrat's Guide to Great Estates. Since 2021 she has run her own series, American Countess, on YouTube.

== Early life ==
Julie Fisher was born on February 17, 1972, to Thomas Fisher, and was brought up in Sugar Grove, Illinois, as one of five siblings. She went on to study computer science at Indiana University where she became a member of Delta Delta Delta. Fisher moved to London to work for an internet-based company, and was working at a digital agency when she met Luke Montagu in 2003. At the time, she was a single mother with two children, and had assumed he was not interested in her.

Three months after they began dating, the couple spent a weekend on the Isle of Wight and she noticed that his credit cards read ‘Viscount Hinchingbrooke’. Only then did he explain that he was a member of the aristocracy and his parents were John Montagu, 11th Earl of Sandwich and Caroline Montagu, Countess of Sandwich. A year after they first met, they were married at Mapperton House in Dorset, the country estate of the Earl of Sandwich.

When Luke suffered years of side effects from being removed from prescription medication by an addiction clinic (and was later awarded £1.35 million in compensation), Montagu began running yoga classes in nearby church halls in order to bring some money into the household. By that time, Luke was unable to continue in his position as director of the Met Film School, so Montagu became the sole supporter.

According to a June 2020 magazine article, Montagu is a “qualified yoga teacher, nutritionist and mindfulness guru”.

== Career ==
Montagu started a blog, called the “Flexi Foodie” and wrote a successful cookbook, Superfoods: The Flexible Approach to Eating More Superfoods & Superfoods Superfast. She founded the charity Council for Evidence-Based Psychiatry after Luke's recovery, based on their experiences.

She was then offered a position on the reality television series Ladies of London as her husband was recovering. She later said of the series, “We thought long and hard before accepting as it offered financial support for a while. But it was not fun to do. I was expected to behave in a way I wasn't, like an It girl or socialite, when I'm not. They edit you... You have to go along with things or you get fired. But you know it was a job. I was acting”. She celebrated when it was cancelled after three seasons. In 2016, the couple took over the running of the Mapperton Estate. By that time, Far from the Madding Crowd had recorded some scenes at the estate.

The series brought financial stability which allowed the couple to invest further in the Mapperton Estate, turning an old stable block into a wedding venue. Montagu also opened her own yoga school on the grounds, but continues to practice yoga elsewhere, headlining an act at the Wanderlust yoga festival in Victoria Park, London. During the lead-up to the wedding of Prince Harry and Meghan Markle, Montagu was interviewed on several occasions as she is a United States citizen who married into British aristocracy; she was also an on-site commentator on the wedding for the BBC. She was also interviewed following such events as Markle’s father responding to a letter his daughter had sent him, and the Sussexes’ break from the monarchy in 2020.

In a 2017 interview, the couple were working to increase the business: “by attracting more visitors and more weddings. At the moment we host 12 a year but we are hoping to build that up to 40”. The cost of operating the Mapperton estate was £200,000 per annum at that time. Because of the restrictions due to the COVID-19 pandemic, Luke estimated that they lost £200,000 that year.

After appearing on their Million Dollar American Princess documentary series, she was asked by the Smithsonian Channel to host a new series to air in 2020, An American Aristocrat's Guide to Great Estates, which was also streaming on Amazon Prime Video in North America by March 2021.

On October 17, 2021, Montagu appeared on the CNN documentary series, Diana.

Since 2020, Montagu has run the YouTube channel American Countess, previously named American Viscountess prior to assuming the title of Countess of Sandwich, being travelogue tours of British country houses, accenting interviews, history, customs and culture.

== Personal life ==
She is married to Luke Montagu, 12th Earl of Sandwich, and has four children, two of whom are from her first marriage and two with Luke. She supported her husband through his recovery from a dependency on prescription drugs, and now campaigns for greater awareness of the issue.

In 2021, she enrolled at the University of Buckingham to work towards a Master’s of Arts in Country House studies. She received a Master’s of Arts in Country House studies, passing with distinction, and her dissertation was titled "Redefining the American Heiress".

In February 2025, following the death of her father-in-law and the succession of her husband to the Earldom of Sandwich, Montagu assumed the title of Countess of Sandwich.

Honorary titles
Preceded by Caroline Montagu	Countess of Sandwich; 2025–present	Incumbent
Orders of precedence in the United Kingdom
Preceded by The Countess of Winchilsea	Ladies; The Countess of Sandwich	Followed by The Coutness of Shaftesbury
