= Oliver Montagu =

English lawyer and Member of Parliament

Oliver Montagu (c.1655 – 25 December 1689) was an English lawyer and Member of Parliament.

Oliver Montagu was born around 1655, the third son of Edward Montagu, 1st Earl of Sandwich and Jemima Crew. Together with his twin brother, John, he was initially educated at Huntingdon Grammar School, from where they were summoned to meet Samuel Pepys (a family friend):

The two twins were sent for from schoole, at Mr. Taylor's, to come to see me, and I took them into the garden, and there, in one of the summer-houses, did examine them, and do find them so well advanced in their learning, that I was amazed at it: they repeating a whole ode without book out of Horace, and did give me a very good account of any thing almost, and did make me very readily very good Latin, and did give me good account of their Greek grammar, beyond all possible expectation; and so grave and manly as I never saw, I confess, nor could have believed; so that they will be fit to go to Cambridge in two years at most. They are both little, but very like one another, and well-looked children.

The boys transferred to Westminster School and thence to Trinity College, Cambridge, where Montagu was admitted as a Fellow commoner on 12 April 1672, and awarded an MA in 1673.

Montagu was admitted to the Middle Temple in 1674, called to the bar in 1681, became a bencher in 1684 and a King's Counsel the following year. In 1685, he was elected Member of Parliament for Huntingdon. He was also appointed solicitor general to Queen Mary of Modena later that year. Following the Glorious Revolution, he accepted the new regime and was reappointed as a KC, but died on 25 December 1689.

Parliament of England
Preceded by Sidney Wortley-Montagu; Nicholas Pedley	Member of Parliament for Huntingdon; 1685–1689; With: Lionel Walden	Succeeded by John Bigg; Sidney Wortley-Montagu
