= Bernard baronets =

Set index for Bernard baronets

There have been three baronetcies created for persons with the surname Bernard, one in the Baronetage of England, one in the Baronetage of Great Britain and one in the Baronetage of the United Kingdom. One of the creations is extant as of 2026.

- Bernard baronets of Huntingdon (1662)
- Bernard baronets of Nettleham (1769)
- Bernard baronets of Snakemoor (1954)
