= Sir John Cotton, 3rd Baronet, of Connington =

English landowner and politician

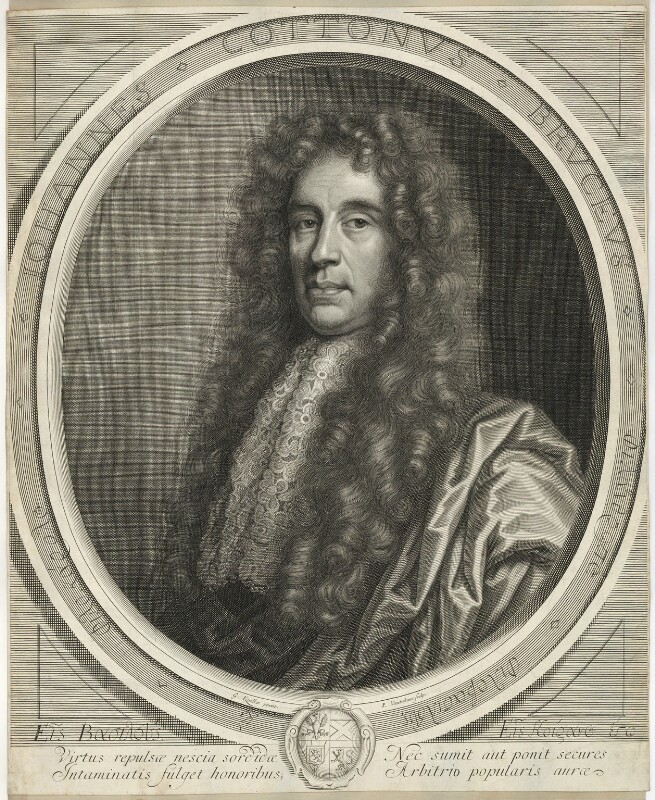
An engraving of Cotton

Sir John Cotton, 3rd Baronet (1621 – 12 September 1702) was an English landowner and politician who sat in the House of Commons of England at various times between 1661 and 1687.

== Early years ==
Cotton was the son of Sir Thomas Cotton, 2nd Baronet of Conington, Huntingdonshire, and his first wife Margaret Howard, daughter of Lord William Howard, of Naworth Castle, Cumberland. He became a gentleman of the Privy Chamber in 1661. He studied at Magdalen College, Oxford, matriculating in 1637.

== Career ==
In 1661, Cotton was elected Member of Parliament for Huntingdon in the Cavalier Parliament. He succeeded to the baronetcy on the death of his father on 13 May 1662. In 1685 he was elected MP for Huntingdonshire.

Cotton died at the age of 80 at Stratton, Bedfordshire, and was buried at Conington where he has a monument.

== Family ==
Cotton married firstly on 8 June 1644 Dorothy Anderson, daughter of Edmund Anderson, of Stratton and Eyworth and his wife Alice Constable, daughter of Sir John Constable, who was later Cotton's stepmother. He married secondly on 20 October 1658, at Mark's Hall, Essex, Elizabeth Honywood, daughter of Sir Thomas Honywood, of Mark's Hall, and his wife Hester Lamotte, daughter of John Lamotte, of London. Elizabeth's portrait was painted by Jacob Huysmans.

His eldest son John predeceased him, and the title passed to his grandson Sir John Cotton, 4th Baronet, of Connington. On the younger Sir John's death without issue, the title passed to his uncle Robert, his grandfather's son by Elizabeth Honywood.

Parliament of England
Preceded by John Bernard; Nicholas Pedley	Member of Parliament for Huntingdon; 1661–1679; With: Lionel Walden (1620-1698)	Succeeded by Hon. Sidney Wortley-Montagu; Sir Nicholas Pedley
Preceded by Sir Thomas Proby, Bt; Silius Titus	Member of Parliament for Huntingdonshire; 1685–1687; With: Sir Lionel Walden	Succeeded by Robert Montagu; Sir Robert Bernard, 3rd Baronet
Baronetage of England
Preceded by Thomas Cotton	Baronet (of Connington); 1662–1702	Succeeded by John Cotton
