= John Montagu, 11th Earl of Sandwich =

British businessman and politician (1943–2025)

The Right Honourable The Earl of Sandwich
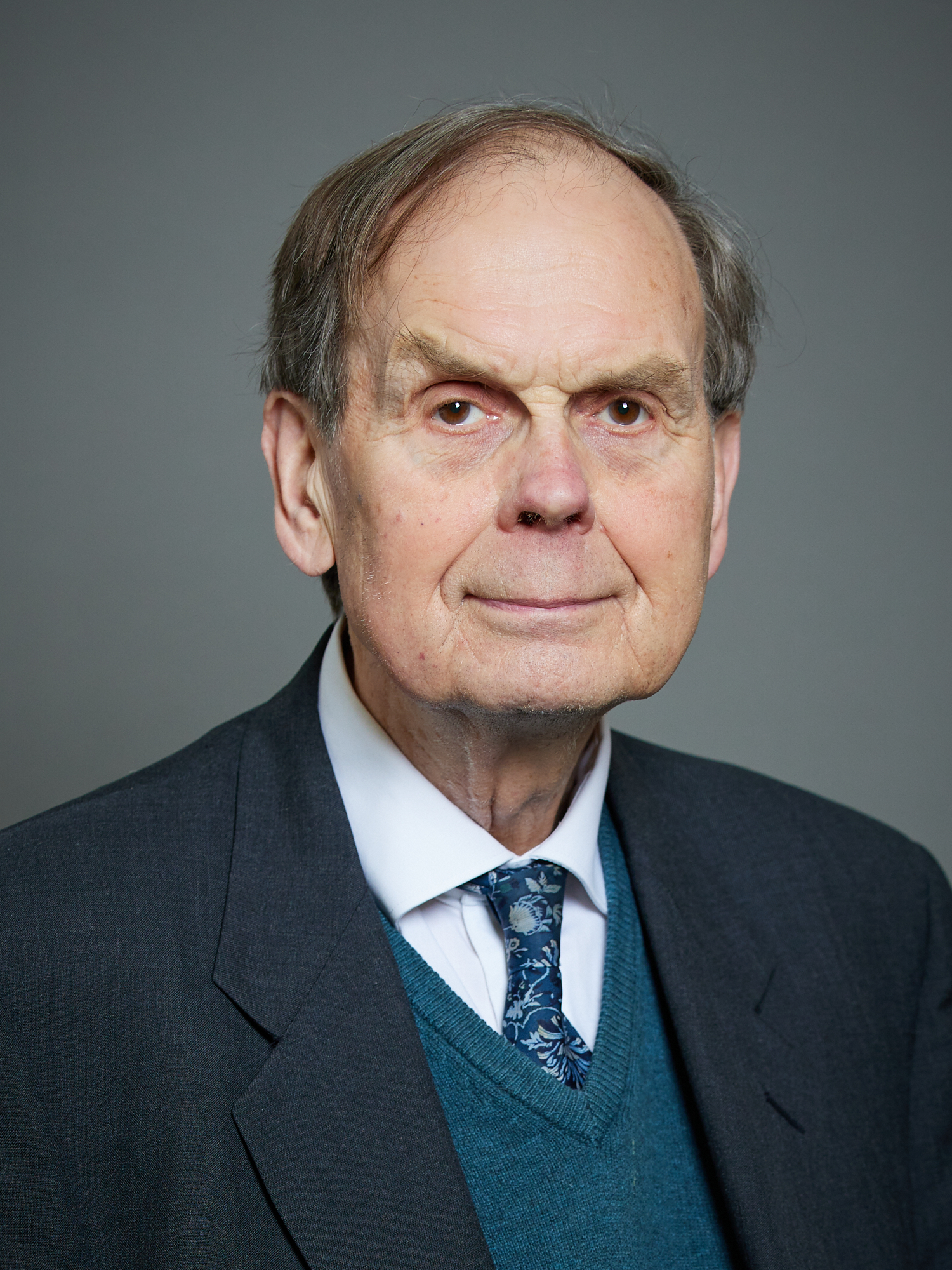
- Official portrait, 2022

Member of the House of Lords
- Lord Temporal
- Hereditary peerage 26 April 1995 – 11 November 1999
- Preceded by: The 10th Earl of Sandwich (disclaimed, 1964)
- Succeeded by: Seat abolished
- Elected Hereditary Peer; 11 November 1999 – 20 May 2024
- Election: 1999
- Preceded by: Seat established
- Succeeded by: Seat abolished

Personal details
- Born: John Edward Hollister Montagu; 11 April 1943
- Died: 1 February 2025 (aged 81) Dorset, England
- Party: Crossbench
- Spouse: Caroline Hayman (m. 1968)
- Children: 3, including Luke Montagu, 12th Earl of Sandwich
- Parents: Victor Montagu (father); Rosemary Peto (mother)
- Education: Eton College
- Alma mater: Trinity College, Cambridge

John Edward Hollister Montagu, 11th Earl of Sandwich (11 April 1943 – 1 February 2025) was a British businessman and politician. He was a crossbench member of the House of Lords from 1995 to 2024.

== Early life and career ==
Lord Sandwich was the eldest son of Victor Montagu, who disclaimed the earldom of Sandwich in 1964, and his first wife Rosemary Maud (née Peto). He succeeded his father to the earldom in 1995 and was one of the ninety elected hereditary peers that remained in the House of Lords after the passing of the House of Lords Act 1999. He sat as a crossbencher and spoke mainly on international development and asylum issues. He retired from the House on 20 May 2024.

Lord Sandwich was educated at Eton College and Trinity College, Cambridge. His seat is Mapperton House in Dorset.

Reflecting the fame of one of their ancestors, the 4th Earl of Sandwich (after whom the sandwich was named in the 18th century), Lord Sandwich and his son, the Hon. Orlando Montagu, established a chain of sandwich shops, Earl of Sandwich. These are located in various parts of the United States, Canada and Asia including Disney Springs, Downtown Disney Disneyland Paris, in partnership with Robert Earl, the entrepreneur behind Hard Rock Cafe and Planet Hollywood chains.

== Personal life ==
Lord Sandwich married Susan Caroline Hayman, daughter of the Anglican clergyman Perceval Ecroyd Cobham Hayman, on 1 July 1968. She is a former business journalist and policy expert at the European Commission, specialising in the Middle East. She is the committee member of a number of organisations promoting links with the region, including the Saudi British Society, and is a senior adviser for Women in Business International. She is also active in a number of organisations in Dorset, including the Heritage Lottery Fund's South West Committee and the Beaminster Festival, and serves as President of the Dorset Natural History & Archaeological Society.

They had three children:

- Luke Timothy Charles Montagu, 12th Earl of Sandwich (born 5 December 1969). He married Julie Fisher (born 17 February 1972) from Sugar Grove, Illinois, United States, on 11 June 2004. In addition to a daughter and son (Emma Fisher, born approx 1999, and Jack Fisher, born approx 2001) from Fisher's previous marriage, they have two sons:
  - William James Hayman Montagu, Viscount Hinchingbrooke (born 2 November 2004)
  - The Hon. Nestor John Sturges Montagu (born 2006)
- The Hon. Orlando William Montagu (born 16 January 1971). He married firstly Laura Roundell in 1996; they divorced in 2002 without issue. On 3 July 2004, Montagu married Lady Honor Wellesley, eldest daughter of the 9th Duke of Wellington, with whom he has two children:
  - Walter Frederick Montagu (born 3 December 2005)
  - Nancy Jemima Montagu (born 18 January 2007)
- Lady Jemima Mary Montagu (born 14 October 1973). In 2013, she married Fisnik Abrashi. They have two children:
  - Lettice Hana Montagu Abrashi (born 3 May 2010)
  - Leo Art Montagu Abrashi (born 28 April 2012)

Lord Sandwich died at Mapperton on 1 February 2025, at the age of 81.

== Notes ==
Peerage of England
Disclaimed Title last held by Victor Montagu	Earl of Sandwich; 1995–2025; Member of the House of Lords (1995–1999)	Succeeded by Luke Montagu
Parliament of the United Kingdom
New office created by the House of Lords Act 1999	Elected hereditary peer to the House of Lords under the House of Lords Act 1999; 1999–2024	Vacant
