= Lionel Walden (1620–1698) =

English Member of Parliament (1620–1698)

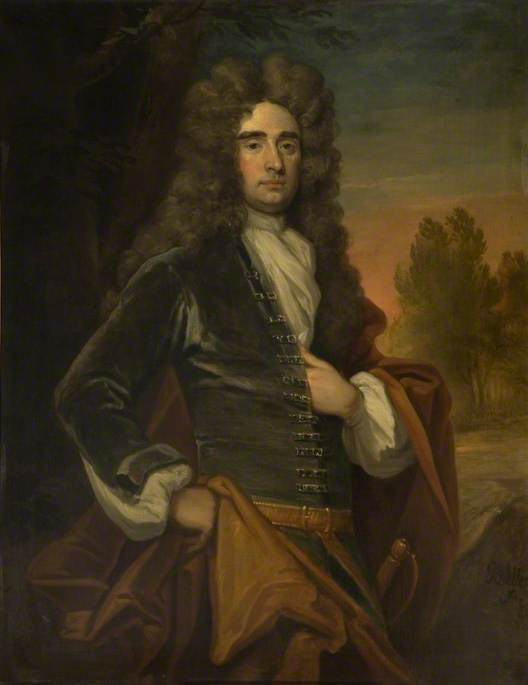
Portrait of Sir Lionel Walden (1620-1698), Mayor of Huntingdon; by Godfrey Kneller.

Sir Lionel Walden (1620 - 23 March 1698) of Huntingdon was an English Member of Parliament in 1661-1679 and 1685-1687 and Mayor of Huntingdon for 1686–87.

== Early life ==
He was born in 1620 and baptised on 19 December 1620. He was the only son of another Lionel Walden and Elizabeth Bawde, daughter of Morrice Bawde of Somersby, Lincolnshire.

== Career ==
He was Member of Parliament for Huntingdon in the Cavalier Parliament from 1661-1679 and for Huntingdonshire in 1685. He was knighted on 29 January 1673 and elected Mayor of Huntingdon for the year 1686–87.

== Family ==
Lionel married Elizabeth Balaam, daughter and coheir of Charles Balaam of Elm, Cambridgeshire. They had a son and two daughters. His son Lionel Walden (c.1653-1701) also became Member of Parliament for Huntingdon.

Parliament of England
Preceded by John Bernard; Nicholas Pedley	Member of Parliament for Huntingdon; 1661–1679; With: Sir John Cotton	Succeeded by Sidney Wortley-Montagu; Nicholas Pedley
Preceded by Sir Thomas Proby; Silius Titus	Member of Parliament for Huntingdonshire; 1685–1687; With: Sir John Cotton	Succeeded by Robert Montagu; Sir Robert Bernard, 3rd Baronet
