= Caroline Montagu, Countess of Sandwich =

British aristocrat

The Right Honourable The Dowager Countess of Sandwich
- Born: Susan Caroline Hayman; 14 October 1942 (age 84)
- Education: Trinity College, Cambridge
- Spouse: John Montagu, 11th Earl of Sandwich (m. 1968; died 2025)
- Children: 3 (including Luke)
- Family: House of Montagu (by marriage)

Caroline Montagu, Dowager Countess of Sandwich (née Susan Caroline Hayman; born 14 October 1942) is a British aristocrat. She was married to John Montagu, 11th Earl of Sandwich from 1968 until his death in 2025. During their marriage, she managed the family estate, Mapperton, but later passed the responsibilities onto her son and daughter-in-law.

== Biography ==
Lady Sandwich was born Susan Caroline Hayman on 14 October 1942 to Rev. Perceval Ecroyd Cobham Hayman and Sylvia Gamble.

She married John Montagu, 11th Earl of Sandwich in 1968. They met while students at Trinity College, Cambridge, where she became a Middle East specialist.

Lady Sandwich has three children:

- Luke Montagu, 12th Earl of Sandwich
- The Hon. Orlando Montagu
- Lady Jemima Montagu Abrashi

She and her husband also raised their nephew, Timothy. She managed the family estate, Mapperton, restoring the properties, woodlands, gardens, and farmland. The home is open to the public and Lady Sandwich gave tours of the grounds. In 2016, she passed on the responsibilities of running the estate to her eldest son, Luke, and his wife, Julie.
