= Earl of Sandwich =

Noble title in the Peerage of England

Earldom of Sandwich
- Quarterly, first and fourth, Argent, three lozenges conjoined in fess Gules, within a border Sable; for Montagu. Second and third, Or, an eagle displayed Vert, beaked and membered Gules; for Monthermer.
- Creation date: 12 July 1660
- Created by: Charles II
- Peerage: Peerage of England
- First holder: Sir Edward Montagu
- Present holder: Luke Montagu, 12th Earl of Sandwich
- Heir apparent: William Montagu, Viscount Hinchingbrooke
- Subsidiary titles: Viscount Hinchingbrooke; Baron Montagu of St Neots
- Seats: Mapperton House, Dorset
- Former seats: Hinchingbrooke House, Cambridgeshire; Hock Court
- Motto: Post tot naufragia portum ("After so many shipwrecks a haven")

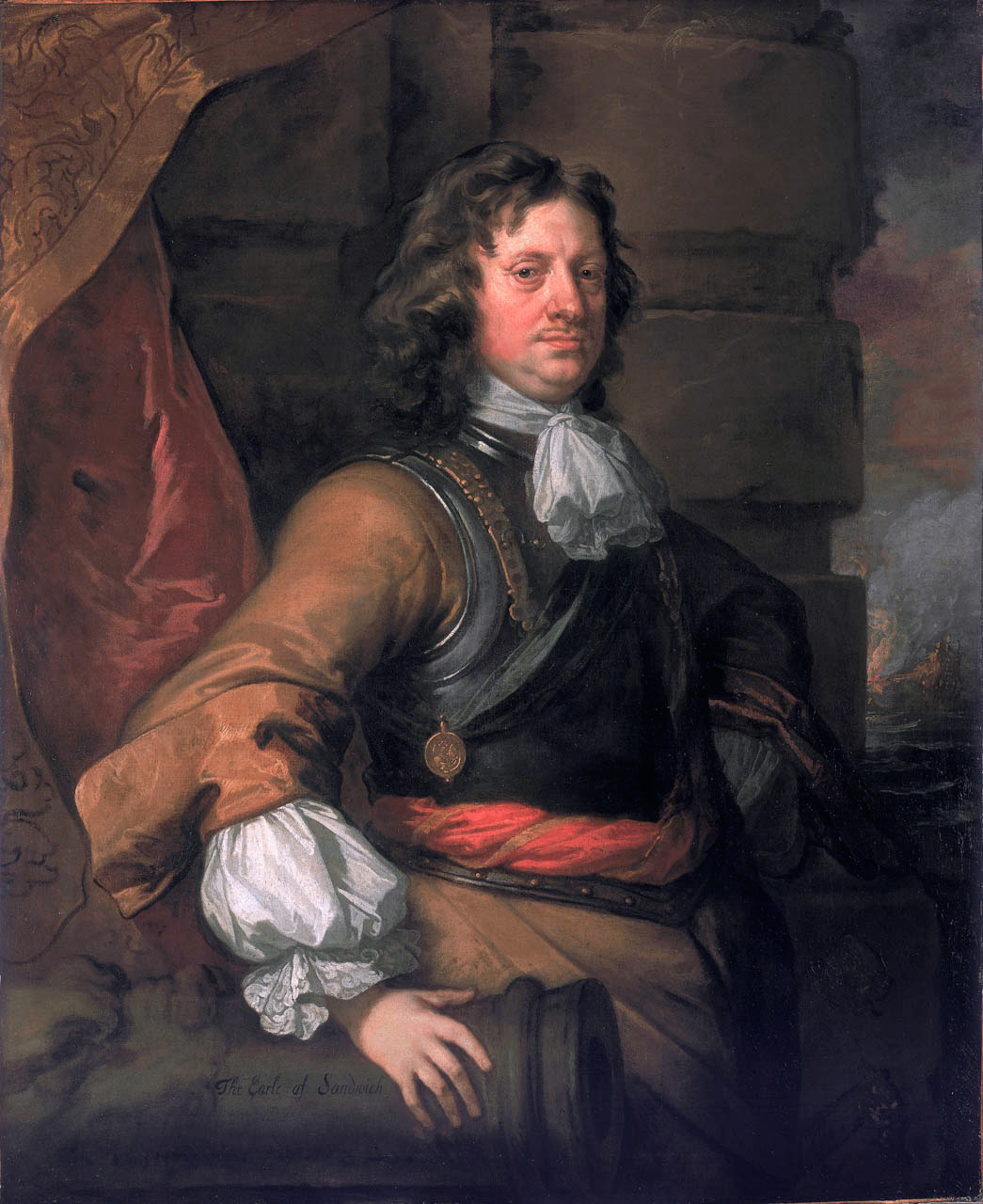
Edward Montagu, 1st Earl

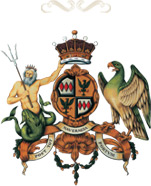
Heraldic achievement of the Earls of Sandwich

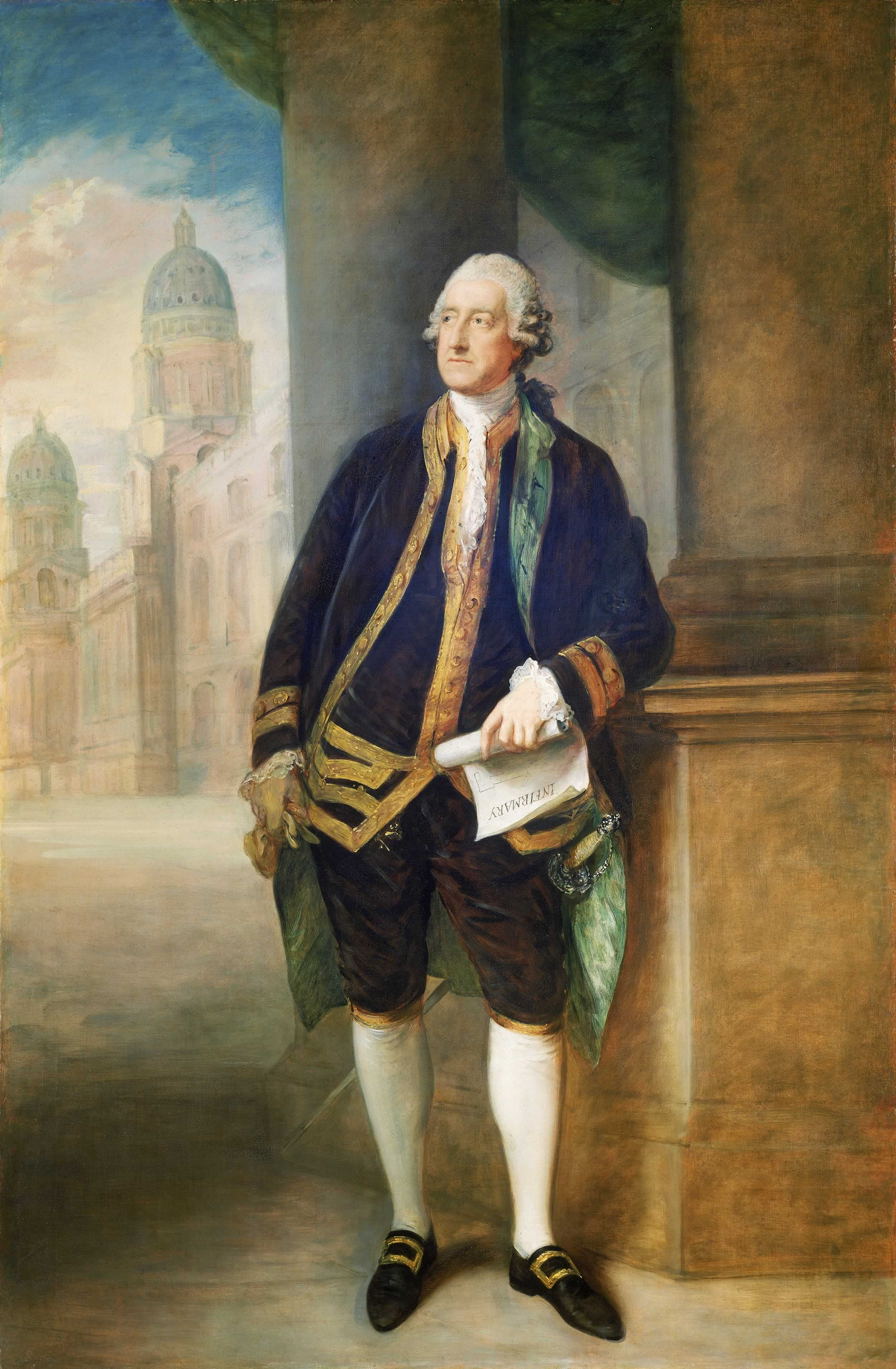
Portrait of the Earl of Sandwich by Thomas Gainsborough, 1783.

Earl of Sandwich is a noble title in the Peerage of England, held since its creation by the House of Montagu. It is nominally associated with Sandwich, Kent. It was created in 1660 for the prominent naval commander Admiral Sir Edward Montagu. He was made Baron Montagu of St Neots, of St Neots in the County of Huntingdon, and Viscount Hinchingbrooke, at the same time, also in the Peerage of England. The viscountcy is used as the courtesy title by the heir apparent to the earldom. A member of the prominent Montagu family, Lord Sandwich was the son of Sir Sidney Montagu, youngest brother of Henry Montagu, 1st Earl of Manchester (from whom the Dukes of Manchester descend), and Edward Montagu, 1st Baron Montagu of Boughton (from whom the Dukes of Montagu descended).

He was succeeded by his son, the 2nd Earl. He briefly represented Dover in the House of Commons and served as Ambassador to Portugal and as Lord Lieutenant of Huntingdonshire and Cambridgeshire.

The second Earl's great-grandson was The 4th Earl of Sandwich, who was a prominent statesman and served as First Lord of the Admiralty and as Secretary of State for the Northern Department. Lord Sandwich is also remembered for sponsoring the voyages of discovery made by Captain James Cook, R.N., who named the Sandwich Islands in his honour, and as the namesake of the sandwich.

He was succeeded by his son, the 5th Earl. He sat as Member of Parliament for Brackley and Huntingdonshire and served as Vice-Chamberlain of the Household and as Master of the Buckhounds. His son, the 6th Earl, also represented Huntingdonshire in Parliament.

He was succeeded by his son, the 7th Earl. He held office in the first two Conservative administrations of the Earl of Derby as Captain of the Honourable Corps of Gentlemen-at-Arms and Master of the Buckhounds and was also Lord Lieutenant of Huntingdonshire. His eldest son, the eighth Earl, represented Huntingdon in the House of Commons as a Conservative and served as Lord Lieutenant of Huntingdonshire.

He was succeeded by his nephew, the ninth Earl. He was the son of Rear-Admiral the Hon. Victor Alexander Montagu, second son of the seventh Earl. Lord Sandwich was Member of Parliament for Huntingdon and Lord Lieutenant of Huntingdonshire.

His son, the tenth Earl, represented South Dorset in Parliament as a Conservative from 1941 to 1962, when he succeeded his father in the earldom and had to resign his seat in the House of Commons and enter the House of Lords. He disclaimed his peerages in 1964 but never returned to the House of Commons.

He was succeeded by his eldest son, John Montagu, the 11th Earl of Sandwich, who succeeded him in 1995. John Montagu was one of the ninety elected hereditary peers that remain in the House of Lords after the passing of the House of Lords Act 1999, and sat as a cross-bencher.

The twelfth and current Earl succeeded his father in 2025. Lord Sandwich is known for his philanthropy, and was once Director at the MetFilm School.

Today the family seat is at Mapperton in Dorset. From the 17th century until the 1960s, the family also owned Hinchingbrooke House in Huntingdonshire, now a school, from which the title Viscount Hinchingbrooke was derived.

Some historical papers of the family and its Hinchingbrooke estate are held by Cambridgeshire Archives and Local Studies at the County Record Office in Huntingdon.

== Earls of Sandwich (1660) ==
- Edward Montagu, 1st Earl of Sandwich (1625–1672)
- Edward Montagu, 2nd Earl of Sandwich (1644–1689)
- Edward Montagu, 3rd Earl of Sandwich (1670–1729)
  - Edward Richard Montagu, Viscount Hinchingbrooke (1692–1722)
- John Montagu, 4th Earl of Sandwich (1718–1792) (inventor of the sandwich)
- John Montagu, 5th Earl of Sandwich (1744–1814)
- George John Montagu, 6th Earl of Sandwich (1773–1818)
- John William Montagu, 7th Earl of Sandwich (1811–1884)
- Edward George Henry Montagu, 8th Earl of Sandwich (1839–1916)
  - The Honourable Victor Alexander Montagu (1841–1915)
- George Charles Montagu, 9th Earl of Sandwich (1874–1962)
- (Alexander) Victor Edward Paulet Montagu, 10th Earl of Sandwich (1906–1995) (disclaimed 1964)
- John Edward Hollister Montagu, 11th Earl of Sandwich (1943–2025)
- Luke Timothy Charles Montagu, 12th Earl of Sandwich (born 1969)

The heir apparent is the current Earl's eldest son, William James Hayman Montagu, Viscount Hinchingbrooke (b. 2004).

== Family tree ==
Montagu family tree— Manchester: Earls and Dukes, Montagu: and Earls and Dukes, and Monthermer: Viscounts and Marquesses

Edward Montagu c. 1485–1557
Edward Montagu c. 1530–1602
Baron Montagu of Boughton, 1621	Viscount Mandeville and Baron Montagu of Kimbolton, of Kimbolton in the County of Huntingdon, 1620; Earl of Manchester, 1626
Edward Montagu c. 1562–1644; 1st Baron Montagu of Boughton	Henry Montagu c. 1563–1642; 1st Earl of Manchester, etc.	Sidney Montagu c. 1572–1644
Earl of Sandwich, Viscount Hinchingbrooke, Baron Montagu of St Neots, of St Neots in the County of Huntingdon, 1660
Edward Montagu; 1616–1684; 2nd Baron Montagu of Boughton	Edward Montagu; 1602–1671; 2nd Earl of Manchester, etc.	George Montagu; 1622–1681	Edward Montagu; 1625–1672; 1st Earl of Sandwich, etc.
Earl of Montagu and Viscount Monthermer, 1689; Duke of Montagu and Marquess of Monthermer (1st creation), 1705	Baron Halifax, 1700; Earl of Halifax (2nd creation) and Viscount Sunbury (2nd creation), 1714
Edward Montagu c. 1636–1665	Ralph Montagu; 1638–1709; 1st Duke of Montagu, etc., 3rd Baron Montagu of Boughton	Robert Montagu; 1634–1683; 3rd Earl of Manchester, etc.	Edward Montagu; 1649–1690	Charles Montagu; 1661–1715; 1st Earl of Halifax etc., 1st Baron Halifax	Edward Montagu; 1647/48–1688; 2nd Earl of Sandwich, etc.
Earldom of Halifax (2nd creation) and Viscount Sunbury extinct, 1715
Duke of Manchester, 1719	Earl of Halifax (3rd creation) and Viscount Sunbury (3rd creation), 1714
John Montagu; 1690–1749; 2nd Duke of Montagu, etc., 4th Baron Montagu of Boughton	Charles Edward Montagu c. 1662–1722; 1st Duke of Manchester, 4th Earl of Manchester, etc.	George Montagu; 1685–1739; 1st Earl of Halifax, etc., 2nd Baron Halifax	Edward Montagu; 1670–1729; 3rd Earl of Sandwich, etc.
Dukedom of Montagu (1st creation) and subsidiary titles extinct, 1749
Duke of Montagu (2nd creation) and Marquess of Monthermer (2nd creation), 1766; Baron Montagu of Boughton (3rd creation), 1776
George Brudenell; 1712–1790; Duke of Montagu, etc., Earl of Cardigan; 1st Baron Montagu of Boughton	Mary Montagu c. 1711–1775	Isabella Montagu d. 1786	William Montagu; 1700–1739; 2nd Duke of Manchester, 5th Earl of Manchester, etc.	Robert Montagu c. 1710–1762; 3rd Duke of Manchester, 6th Earl of Manchester, etc.	George Montagu-Dunk; 1716–1771; 2nd Earl of Halifax, etc., 3rd Baron Halifax	Edward Montagu; 1692–1722 styled Viscount Hinchingbrooke	John Montagu; 1718–1792; 4th Earl of Sandwich, etc.
Dukedom of Montagu (2nd creation) and subsidiary titles extinct, 1790	Earldom of Halifax (3rd creation) and subsidiary titles extinct, 1771
Baron Montagu of Boughton (2nd creation), 1762
John Montagu; 1735–1770; Baron Montagu of Boughton, styled Marquess of Monthermer	Elizabeth Montagu; 1743–1827	George Montagu; 1737–1788; 4th Duke of Manchester, 7th Earl of Manchester, etc.	Elizabeth Montague-Dunk d. 1768	John Montagu; 1744–1814; 5th Earl of Sandwich, etc.
Baron Montagu of Boughton (2nd creation) extinct, 1770
Henry Montagu-Scott; 1776–1845; 2nd Baron Montagu of Boughton	George Montagu; 1763–1772 styled Viscount Mandeville	William Montagu; 1771–1843; 5th Duke of Manchester, 8th Earl of Manchester, etc.	John George Montagu; 1767–1790 styled Viscount Hinchinbroke	George John Montagu; 1773–1818; 6th Earl of Sandwich, etc.
Baron Montagu of Boughton (3rd creation) extinct, 1845
George Montagu; 1799–1855; 6th Duke of Manchester, 9th Earl of Manchester, etc.
William Drogo Montagu; 1823–1890; 7th Duke of Manchester, 10th Earl of Manchester, etc.	Robert Montagu; 1825–1902	John William Montagu; 1811–1884; 7th Earl of Sandwich, etc.
George Victor Drogo Montagu; 1853–1892; 8th Duke of Manchester, 11th Earl of Manchester, etc.	Robert Acheson Cromie Montagu; 1854–1931	Edward George Henry Montagu; 1839–1916; 8th Earl of Sandwich, etc.	Victor Alexander Montagu; 1841–1915
William Angus Drogo Montagu; 1877–1947; 9th Duke of Manchester, 12th Earl of Manchester, etc.	John Michael Cromie Montagu; 1881–1966	George Charles Montagu; 1874–1962; 9th Earl of Sandwich, etc.
Alexander George Francis Drogo Montagu; 1902–1977; 10th Duke of Manchester, 13th Earl of Manchester, etc.	Robert Alexander Montagu; 1917–1996	Alexander Victor Edward Paulet Montagu; 1906–1995; 10th Earl of Sandwich, etc.
Sidney Arthur Robin George Drogo Montagu; 1929–1985; 11th Duke of Manchester, 14th Earl of Manchester, etc.	Angus Charles Drogo Montagu; 1938–2002; 12th Duke of Manchester, 15th Earl of Manchester, etc.	John Edward Hollister Montagu; 1943–2025; 11th Earl of Sandwich, etc.
Alexander Charles David Drogo Montagu b. 1962; 13th Duke of Manchester, 16th Earl of Manchester, etc.	Kimble William Drogo Montagu b. 1964	Emma Louise Eveleen Montagu Hodgkinson; 1965–2014	Michael Anthony Montagu b. 1955	Luke Timothy Charles Montagu b. 1969; 12th Earl of Sandwich, etc.
Heir presumptive to the dukedom of Manchester
William James Hayman Montagu b. 2004 styled Viscount Hinchingbrooke
Heir apparent to the earldom of Sandwich

== Line of succession (simplified) ==
Line of succession (simplified)
- George Montagu, 9th Earl of Sandwich (1874–1962)
  - Alexander Victor Edward Paulet Montagu, 10th Earl of Sandwich (1906–1995) (disclaimed 1964)
    - John Montagu, 11th Earl of Sandwich (1943–2025)
      - Luke Montagu, 12th Earl of Sandwich (born 1969)
        - (1) William James Hayman Montagu, Viscount Hinchingbrooke (born 2004)
        - (2) Hon. Nestor John Sturges Montagu (born 2006)
      - (3) Hon. Orlando William Montagu (born 1971)
        - (4) Walter Frederick Montagu (born 2005)
    - (5) Hon. George Charles Robert Montagu (born 1949)
      - (6) Oliver Drogo Montagu (born 1974)
      - (7) Cosimo Ralph Montagu (born 1988)
  - Hon. William Drogo Sturges Montago (1908–1940)
    - John Dru Montagu (1932–2025)
      - male issue and descendants in remainder
