= John Bigg (MP) =

English Member of Parliament

John Bigg (5 July 1652 – c. 1710), of Graham, Huntingdonshire, was an English Member of Parliament.

He was the son of Walter Bigg, Member of Parliament for Wallingford.

He was a Member (MP) of the Parliament of England for Huntingdon in 1689.

Parliament of England
Preceded by Oliver Montagu; Lionel Walden	Member of Parliament for Huntingdon; 1689; With: Sidney Wortley-Montagu	Succeeded by RIchard Montagu; Sidney Wortley-Montagu
