= Bernard baronets of Snakemoor (1954) =

Escutcheon of the Bernard baronets of Snakemoor

The Bernard baronetcy, of Snakemoor, Botley in the County of Southampton, was created in the Baronetage of the United Kingdom on 27 January 1954 for Dallas Bernard, Deputy Governor of the Bank of England from 1949 to 1954. As of 2026 the title is held by his son, the 2nd Baronet, who succeeded in 1975.

== Bernard baronets, of Snakemoor (1954) ==
- Sir Dallas Gerald Mercer Bernard, 1st Baronet (1888–1975)
- Sir Dallas Edmund Bernard, 2nd Baronet (born 1926), without male heir
