= John Montagu (Trinity) =

English churchman and academic

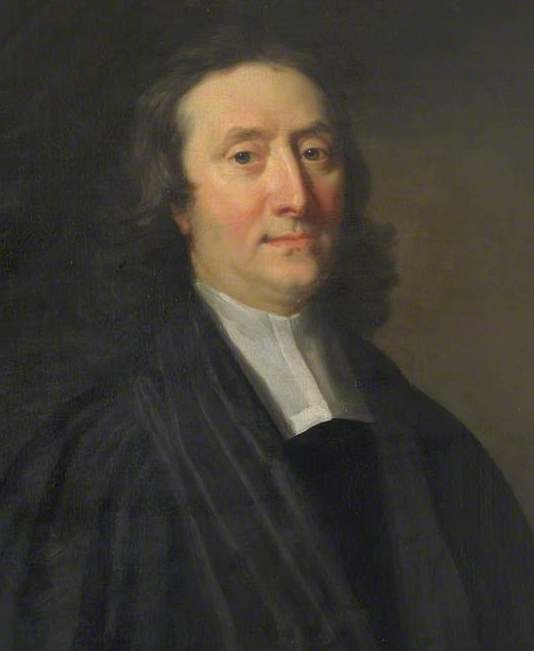

Dean of Durham
- In office 1700–1728
- Preceded by: Thomas Comber
- Succeeded by: Henry Bland

Vice-Chancellor of the University of Cambridge
- In office 1687–1688
- Preceded by: John Balderston
- Succeeded by: John Covel

Master of Trinity College, Cambridge
- In office 1683–1699
- Preceded by: John North
- Succeeded by: Richard Bentley

Personal details
- Born: c.1655
- Died: 23 February 1728/29
- Parent(s): Edward Montagu, 1st Earl of Sandwich; Jemimah Crew

John Montagu or Mountague (c.1655 – 23 February 1728/29) was an English churchman and academic.

== Life ==
He was the fourth son of Admiral Edward Montagu, 1st Earl of Sandwich, who was killed at the Battle of Solebay in 1672, and his wife Jemima Crew, daughter of John, Lord Crew. Together with his twin brother, Oliver, he was initially educated at Huntingdon Grammar School, from where they were summoned to meet Samuel Pepys (a family friend):

The two twins were sent for from schoole, at Mr. Taylor's, to come to see me, and I took them into the garden, and there, in one of the summer-houses, did examine them, and do find them so well advanced in their learning, that I was amazed at it: they repeating a whole ode without book out of Horace, and did give me a very good account of any thing almost, and did make me very readily very good Latin, and did give me good account of their Greek grammar, beyond all possible expectation; and so grave and manly as I never saw, I confess, nor could have believed; so that they will be fit to go to Cambridge in two years at most. They are both little, but very like one another, and well-looked children.

The boys transferred to Westminster School and thence to Trinity College, Cambridge, where John entered as a fellow-commoner on 12 April 1672, proceeded MA. jure natalium, 1673 and was elected a fellow in 1674.

In 1680, Montagu was made master of Sherburn Hospital by his uncle Bishop Crew, and in 1683 a prebend of Durham. On 12 May 1683, King James also made him Master of Trinity College, Cambridge. He may have been provided with the mastership as a reward for his father's service. On 27 September 1686, he was awarded a Doctorate by Royal mandate. He was promoted to Vice-chancellor in 1687. From 1695 to 1702, he was Clerk of the Closet for William III. In either 1699 or 1700, he resigned the mastership of Trinity and became Dean of Durham, which he kept until his death in 1728. Montagu was admitted a member of the Spalding Gentlemen's Society on 22 August 1723. He died unmarried, at his house in Bedford Row, Holborn, London, on 23 February 1728, aged 73, and was interred at Barnwell, Northamptonshire, the burying-place of his family.

Trinity College is said to have declined in numbers or reputation during Montagu's mastership, on account of the relaxation of discipline which his easy temper encouraged. He was a liberal benefactor to the college, subscribing £228 towards the cost of the new library, and allowing £170, due to him as master when he resigned, to be expended in purchasing furniture for the master's lodge. This sum had been claimed by his successor, Dr. Richard Bentley, and the above compromise was not effected until 1702, when the thanks of the society were given to Montagu, and his name inscribed in the register of benefactors by the master. In 1720, when Bentley was projecting an edition of the New Testament, Montagu lent him some manuscripts from the Chapter Library at Durham.

Academic offices
Preceded by John North	Master of Trinity College, Cambridge; 1683–1699	Succeeded by Richard Bentley
