= Sidney Wortley Montagu =

British coal-owner and Whig politician

Sidney Wortley Montagu (28 July 1650 – 9 November 1727), of Wortley, Yorkshire and Walcot, Northamptonshire, was a British coal-owner and Whig politician who sat in the English and British House of Commons between 1679 and 1727. He was one of the leading coal owners in the North-East and a member of powerful coal cartels. Although he served in Parliament over a long period, his contributions there were limited.

== Early life ==
Montagu was the second son of Edward Montagu, 1st Earl of Sandwich, MP, and his wife Jemima Crew, daughter of John Crew, 1st Baron Crew of Stene. As his father's favourite child, he received a more liberal education than his younger brothers. He was educated at Twickenham under Dr Fuller by 1660 and attended the académie du Plessis, Paris from 1662 to 1664. He accompanied his father at the Battle of Vågen in 1665.

Between 1666 and 1671, he travelled abroad in Flanders, Germany, Italy and France.and Spain where his father was envoy in 1667. In 1675 he became an ensign in the Royal Foot Guards, later Grenadier Guards.

About 1676, he married Anne Newcomen, his father's ward, who was brought up at Hinchingbrooke. She was the illegitimate daughter and heir of Sir Francis Wortley, 2nd Baronet of Wortley, Yorkshire who had died in 1666. Montagu assumed the additional name of Wortley. He developed extensive mining interests in Durham and Northumberland, allegedly based upon favourable leases of episcopal lands obtained from his kinsman Nathaniel Crew, Bishop of Durham.

== Political career ==
Wortley Montagu's political interest was based on his family's influence in the Midlands. He was returned as Member of Parliament for Huntingdon after a contested election in February 1679. He was nominated to the committee of elections and privileges in the first Exclusion Parliament, but made no speeches and was absent from the division on the exclusion bill. He was commissioner for assessment for Huntingdonshire and Huntingdon from 1679 to 1680. At the general election of August 1679, he was returned for Huntingdon again but was inactive in the second Exclusion Parliament.

He was appointed Deputy Lieutenant for West Riding for a year in 1680. He was returned again in February 1681 and was again appointed to the elections committee in the third exclusion parliament. After a brief canvass in Huntingdon in 1685, he abandoned the contest at the March 1685 general election.

Wortley Montagu initially disapproved of the landing of William of Orange, but on reports of desertion from James's army, he took a prominent part in the Revolution. He occupied Sheffield with the West Riding militia, and was the second to sign the Yorkshire petition for a free Parliament. He was again returned for Huntingdon at the general election of January 1689 to the Convention, and was again appointed only to the elections committee. He supported the disabling clause in the bill to restore corporations. His wife turned Roman Catholic and went abroad. He was allowed to bring in a bill for a competent maintenance for their children, in case his wife survived him, which received royal assent as the Wortley Estate (Children's Maintenance) Act 1688 (1 Will. & Mar. Sess. 2. c. 4 Pr) before the dissolution.

He was appointed Deputy Lieutenant for West Riding again in October 1688, and held the position for the rest of his life. He was also appointed a justice of the peace for Northamptonshire and was appointed Commissioner for assessment for Huntingdonshire, Northamptonshire and West Riding of Yorkshire from 1689 to 1690.

Wortley Montagu was trustee for the estates of his nephew, Edward Montagu, 3rd Earl of Sandwich a weak-willed man, which gave him his influence at Huntingdon elections. A protracted struggle for control raged between Wortley Montagu and Sandwich's wife, Elizabeth Wilmot but Montagu was able to return at least one Member for Huntingdon at all but one of the elections between 1690 and 1715. Montagu was returned for Huntingdon at the 1690 English general election but made no further significant contribution to the 1690 parliament. He was Justice of the Peace for West Yorkshire by 1690, serving for the rest of his life. At the 1695 English general election, he stood down from his Huntingdon seat to make way for the nominee of his kinsman the 4th Earl of Manchester. He was appointed Commissioner for taking subscriptions to the land bank in 1696. He returned to Parliament, at a by-election for Camelford on 1 April 1696. He abstained from the vote of 25 November 1696 on the attainder of Sir John Fenwick. At the 1698 English general election, he was returned instead as MP for Peterborough on the Whig interest of Lord Fitzwilliam.

Wortley Montagu was a follower of the Whig Junto in early 1700 and was returned on the Whig interest for Peterborough in both the elections in 1701 elections. He was justice of the peace for Huntingdonshire by 1701. He was returned unopposed for Peterborough at the 1702 English general election, but the struggle to control the interest at Huntingdon with the Tory-supporting Lady Sandwich intensified and led to dispute within parliament. He was again otherwise relatively inactive in Parliament. He was returned again for Peterborough at the 1705 English general election and on 25 October he voted for the Court candidate for Speaker.

At the 1708 British general election, he was returned again for Peterborough. He supported the bill to naturalize the Palatines which was guided through the Commons by his son Edward. In 1710, he supported the impeachment of Henry Sacheverel. He was defeated at Peterborough at the 1710 British general election, and his petition against the return was unsuccessful.

As a member of a north-east coal cartel with his brother, Charles Montagu, and Sir Henry Liddell, 3rd Baronet, he petitioned the Commons on 13 April 1710, against a bill to dissolve and prevent further combinations in the coal trade, and through extensive lobbying, was able to negate the bill's effect upon their activities. He was appointed joint High Steward of Northallerton, Yorkshire by 1713.

Recognising the value of a seat in parliament, he replaced his son as Member for Huntingdon at the 1713 British general election, his interest in the borough remaining strong despite the intrusion in this election of his great-nephew Edward Montagu, Viscount Hinchingbrooke. He remained an inactive Member, but on 18 March 1714 voted against the expulsion of Richard Steele.

Wortley Montagu was returned for Huntingdon on his family's interest at the 1715 British general election, and remained loyal to the Whig Administration and voted for the septennial bill in 1716, but was absent from other recorded divisions. He was returned again on his own interest for Peterborough at the 1722 British general election. At the 1727 British general election he was defeated in the poll at Peterborough, but his petition was posthumously resolved in his favour on 13 May 1728.

== Coal cartels ==
Wortley Montagu was on the directorate of a powerful coal cartel formed in 1709, and by 1714, was one of the greatest coal owners of the day, actively co-operating with other representatives of the industry in Parliament on matters affecting their joint interests. In 1716 his defection led to the break up of the cartel, earning him considerable unpopularity among his former associate. In 1726 he joined with two other major coal proprietors, George Bowes and the Liddells, to form a new cartel, the Grand Allies, ‘which dominated the coal trade for the rest of the century’.

== Death and legacy ==
Wortley Montagu died on 9 November 1727, having survived his wife and his male children, except his second son, Edward, who succeeded to all his coal mining interests as well as to the settled Wortley estates. He also had grandchildren by his deceased son John, and two surviving daughters.

Parliament of England
Preceded by Sir John Cotton, 3rd Bt; Lionel Walden	Member of Parliament for Huntingdon; 1679–1685; With: Sir Nicholas Pedley 1679; Lionel Walden 1679-1685	Succeeded by Hon. Oliver Montagu; Lionel Walden
Preceded by Hon. Oliver Montagu; Lionel Walden	Member of Parliament for Huntingdon; 1689–1695; With: John Bigg 1689-1690; Hon. Richard Montagu 1690-1695	Succeeded by Hon. Richard Montagu; John Pocklington
Preceded by Ambrose Manaton; Robert Molesworth	Member of Parliament for Camelford; 1696–1698; With: Robert Molesworth	Succeeded by Henry Manaton; Dennys Glynn
Preceded by Sir William Brownlow, 4th Baronet; Sir Gilbert Dolben, 1st Baronet	Member of Parliament for Peterborough; 1698–1707; With: Francis St John; Sir Gilbert Dolben, 1st Baronet	Succeeded by Parliament of Great Britain
Parliament of Great Britain
Preceded by Parliament of England	Member of Parliament for Peterborough; 1707–1710; With: Sir Gilbert Dolben, 1st Baronet	Succeeded by John FitzWilliam, Viscount Milton; Charles Parker
Preceded by Edward Wortley Montagu; Francis Page	Member of Parliament for Huntingdon; 1713–1722; With: Viscount Hinchingbrooke	Succeeded by Edward Wortley Montagu; Roger Handasyde
Preceded by John FitzWilliam, Viscount Milton; Charles Parker	Member of Parliament for Peterborough; 1722–1727; With: John FitzWilliam, Viscount Milton	Succeeded by John FitzWilliam, Viscount Milton; Sir Edward O'Bryan, 2nd Baronet
Preceded by John FitzWilliam, Viscount Milton; Sir Edward O'Bryan, 2nd Baronet	Member of Parliament for Peterborough; 1727–1728; With: John FitzWilliam, Viscount Milton	Succeeded by John FitzWilliam, Viscount Milton; Joseph Banks
