= Abraham Burrell =

English politician

Abraham Burrell (1589–1657) was an English politician who sat in the House of Commons from 1645 to 1653. He supported the Parliamentary cause in the English Civil War.

Burrell was born in London, the son of Richard Burrell, and was baptised at St Benet Gracechurch on 18 January 1589. His father owned tenements in London and Burrell and his brothers also managed these properties. In 1622 he acquired the manor of Shapwick, Somerset. He showed early antipathy towards the King when in 1639 he refused to contribute towards the cost of the Bishops War against the Scots. In 1640 he sold Shapwick Manor to Sir Samuel Rolle, Hugh Fortescue, and Henry Rolle, and in 1641 acquired the manor, grange, watermill, etc. of Medloe Highfield, Huntingdonshire.

In September 1645, Burrell was elected Member of Parliament for Huntingdon in the Long Parliament after the previous member inherited a peerage. Burrell was unusual in writing an agreement with his electorate in which he undertook to demand no payment from the burgesses. He was a member of the committee for Huntingdonshire, and a commissioner of the High Court of Justice in 1649, but refused to take part in the trial of the King.

Burrell died in 1657, and a memorial was erected to him in the church of St James, Little Paxton.

Burrell married Elizabeth Butts, daughter of Richard Butts of Ham Court, Chertsey in 1617. They had four daughters, one of whom, Elizabeth, married Sir Drayner Massingberd, a parliamentary colonel.

Parliament of England
Preceded by George Montagu; Edward Montagu	Member of Parliament for Huntingdon; 1645–1653; With: George Montagu 1645–1648	Succeeded by Not represented in Barebones Parliament
