= Luke Montagu, 12th Earl of Sandwich =

British aristocrat and philanthropist (born 1969)

The Right Honourable The Earl of Sandwich
- Born: Luke Timothy Charles Montagu; 5 December 1969 (age 56)
- Education: Westminster School
- Alma mater: Columbia University
- Spouse: Julie Fisher (m. 2004)
- Children: 2
- Parents: John Montagu, 11th Earl of Sandwich (father); Caroline Hayman (mother)

Luke Timothy Charles Montagu, 12th Earl of Sandwich (born 5 December 1969), styled Viscount Hinchingbrooke between 1995 and 2025, is a British aristocrat and philanthropist. He became Viscount Hinchingbrooke on the death of his grandfather in 1995, and became the 12th Earl of Sandwich on 1 February 2025, on the death of his father.

== Early life and education ==
Luke Timothy Charles Montagu was born on 5 December 1969, and is the eldest son of John Montagu, 11th Earl of Sandwich, and Caroline Hayman. He was educated at Westminster School and later studied film at Columbia University. He met his wife, Julie Fisher, in 2003 while she was living in London as a single mother with two children. A year after they first met they were married at Mapperton House, Dorset, the country estate of the Earls of Sandwich.

Montagu suffered years of side effects from being removed from prescription medication by an addiction clinic, and was later awarded £1.35 million in compensation. His wife began running yoga classes in nearby church halls to bring some money into the household. By then Luke was unable to continue in his position as director of the Met Film School, so Julie became the sole supporter.

== Personal life ==
On 11 June 2004, Montagu married Julie Fisher, originally from Sugar Grove, Illinois. She has two children from a previous marriage, and together they have two children:

- William James Hayman Montagu, Viscount Hinchingbrooke (born 2 November 2004)
- Hon. Nestor John Sturges Montagu (born 17 October 2006)

The family lives at Mapperton House in Dorset.

Peerage of England
Preceded by John Montagu	Earl of Sandwich; 2025–present	Incumbent; Heir apparent: William Montagu, Viscount Hinchingbrooke
