= MetFilm School =

Private Film School at Ealing Studios, London

Coordinates: 51.5135°N 0.1257°W

- Motto: Creative. Practical. Connected.
- Type: Private university, film school
- Established: 2003
- Affiliations: CILECT
- Location: London, United Kingdom
- Campus: Ealing Studios, London; Leeds, Berlin
- Website: MetFilm School

MetFilm School (MFS) is a private film school headquartered at Ealing Studios in London, United Kingdom. It offers undergraduate and postgraduate degrees, as well as short courses in filmmaking, screenwriting, and related disciplines.

The school operates six campuses: five in the United Kingdom — London, Birmingham, Brighton, Leeds, and Manchester — and one in Berlin, Germany.

== History ==
MetFilm School was founded in 2003, by Luke Montagu and Thomas Hoegh, and in 2005 moved from its original Clapham Junction location to Ealing Studios, London.

In 2006, MetFilm launched its production company, MetFilm Production. In 2007, 25 students enrolled in the school's first BA course validated by the University of West London. The school launched its BA Practical Filmmaking with 119 students in 2009. MetFilm productions Little Ashes and French Film were released in the UK and other territories.

In 2012, the school opened up a satellite school in BUFA studios, Berlin and in 2015, the school in Berlin collaborated with YouTube to launch a large studio with production and training facilities for YouTube creators and MetFilm students.

In 2024, MetFilm School was acquired by BIMM University, which saw BIMM's pre-established Screen and Film Schools rebranded to extensions of Met Film School. This saw the likes of Baldwin Li, film producer and producing tutor, transitioning over to the newly established MET Film School Manchester after the rebrand. MET Film School now boast seven campuses, six of which are based in Britain and one situated in Berlin, Germany.

== Faculty ==
As of 2026, Jonny Persey serves as the Director of MetFilm School, while David Howell, former Registrar and Commercial Director at ICMP (Institute of Contemporary Music Performance), is the Chief Executive Officer.

The school has an advisory board which includes Sir Alan Parker, Stephen Frears, Heather Rabbatts, Barnaby Thompson, Jill Tandy, Cameron McCracken, Tony Orsten, David Kosse, Michael Gubb.

The school has informal ties with the National Film and Television School in Beaconsfield, with many of its graduates teaching at MFS.

The school has an array of established industry workers acting as campus patrons, with the likes of Fabian Wagner, Michele D’Acosta, and Adil Ray OBE supporting the school and its students through a variety of channels.

== Alumni ==
- Tunde Aladese, Nigerian actor and screenwriter
