= Arnold Braemes =

Sir Arnold Braemes (3 October 1602 – 13 November 1681) was an English merchant and politician who sat in the House of Commons in 1660.

Braemes (Brames, Braems) was the son of Charles Braemes, a wealthy Dover merchant, and his wife Josina Spike of London. His family was of Flemish descent, his Huguenot great-grandfather, Jasper Braemes, having arrived from Dunkirk in the reign of Queen Mary. He became a merchant at Dover. He was a Royalist and compounded locally for $800. He was a contemporary of Samuel Pepys and accompanied Pepys in the Restoration (1660) of Charles II. In 1660, he was elected Member of Parliament for Dover in the Convention Parliament. He was knighted on 27 May 1660 by Charles II two days before his reign officially started. He was the first manager of the Dover Harbour Board.

Braemes lived at Bridge Place at Bridge, Kent. He died at the age of 79.
