= Mapperton =

Hamlet in Dorset, England

Coordinates: 50.796°N 2.706°W

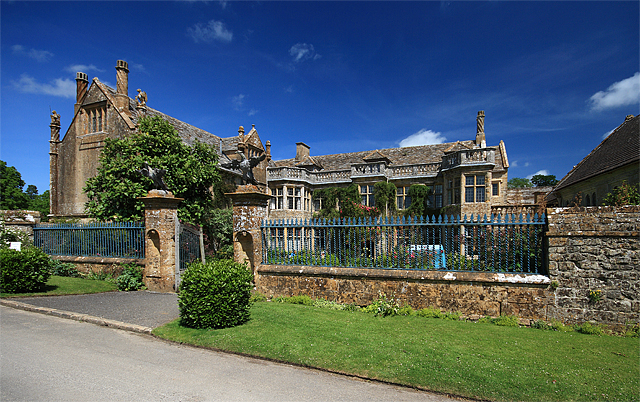
- Mapperton House

- Location within Dorset
- Area: 1.26 sq mi (3.3 km^{2})
- Population: 22 (2021 census)
  - Density: 17/sq mi (6.6/km^{2})
- OS grid reference: SY503999
- Civil parish: Mapperton
- Unitary authority: Dorset
- Ceremonial county: Dorset
- Region: South West
- Country: England
- Sovereign state: United Kingdom
- Post town: Beaminster
- Postcode district: DT8
- Dialling code: 01308
- Police: Dorset
- Fire: Dorset and Wiltshire
- Ambulance: South Western
- UK Parliament: West Dorset

Mapperton is a hamlet and civil parish in Dorset, England, 3 miles (4.8 km) south-east of Beaminster. The parish had a population of 22 people in 10 households at the 2021 census.

The parish of Mapperton is comparatively small at 804 acres (1.26 sq mi; 325 ha). The population has always been low, rising to a peak of 123 in 1821, before falling to 76 in 1901 and 50 in 1931. After the Second World War it dropped further; only 21 residents remained in 1961.

Listed as Malperetone in the Domesday Book, the name means "farmstead where maple trees grow".

== Mapperton House and Estate ==
Mapperton is principally known for Mapperton House, a Grade I listed manor house set within Grade II* registered parkland and gardens.

Mapperton is noted for its manor house, with both house, gardens and Wildlands open to the public from March - October. The house is as is the attached All Saints' Church which dates from the 12th century.

The manor had been owned since the 11th century by only four families (Brett, Morgan, Brodrepp, Compton), all linked by the female line, before it was sold to Ethel Labouchere in 1919. When she died in 1955 the estate was acquired by Victor Montagu, Viscount Hinchingbrooke. It has remained in the Montagu family since then, and as of 2025 is owned by Luke Montagu, 12th Earl of Sandwich.

In 2006 the house was voted the "Nation's Finest Manor House" by Country Life magazine. In 2026, Mapperton featured on Saving Country Houses with Penelope Keith.

The house is run by the current Earl and Countess of Sandwich.

== Gardens and Landscape ==
The gardens at Mapperton are recognised as among the finest in England. The grounds and formal gardens are Grade II* listed.

An Italianate garden was laid out in the 1920s and a wild garden in the 1950s. In 2020, the gardens were named Historic Houses Garden of the Year.

The estate also includes rewilding initiatives known as Mapperton Wildlands, focused on ecological restoration and biodiversity.

== Public Access and Events ==
Mapperton House, gardens and estate grounds are open to the public seasonally, typically from March to October. The estate hosts seasonal events, guided tours and educational programmes.

Mapperton is also used as a venue for private events, including weddings and exclusive-use functions, taking place within the house, gardens and estate buildings.

== Gallery ==
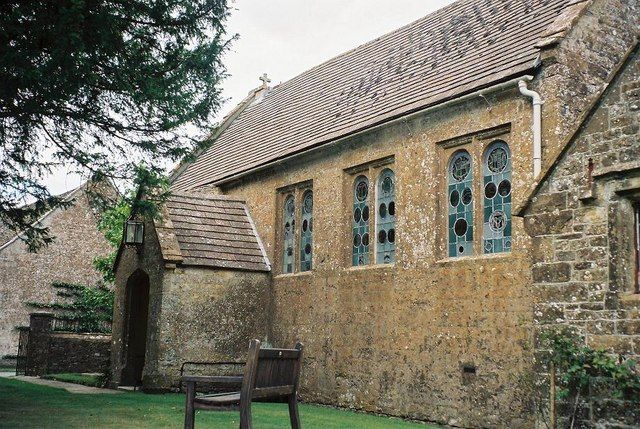
All Saints' church, Mapperton

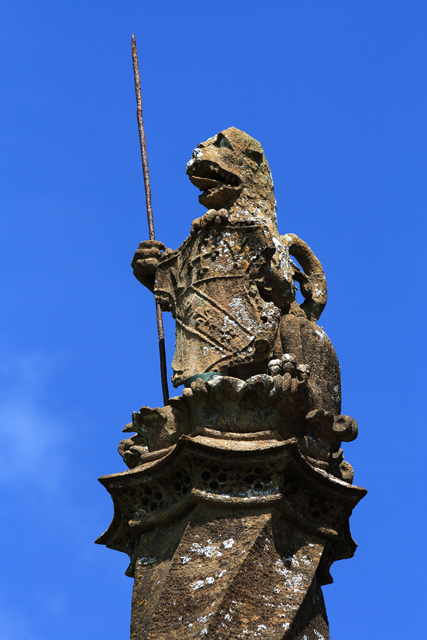
A lion representing the Morgan family is one of two heraldic beasts at Mapperton, sitting atop barley-twist columns on the gable end of the Tudor wing

== Filming location ==
The manor house was used in the filming of the 1996 film Emma, in which it became Randalls, the home of Mrs Weston; the 1997 BBC version of The History of Tom Jones; and the 2015 version of Thomas Hardy's Far from the Madding Crowd. The manor was used again in Rebecca as Manderley's garden, which is open to the public from Spring to Autumn.
