= Edward Montagu, 1st Earl of Sandwich =

English military officer, politician and diplomat (1625–1672)

The Right Honourable The Earl of Sandwich KG PC FRS JP
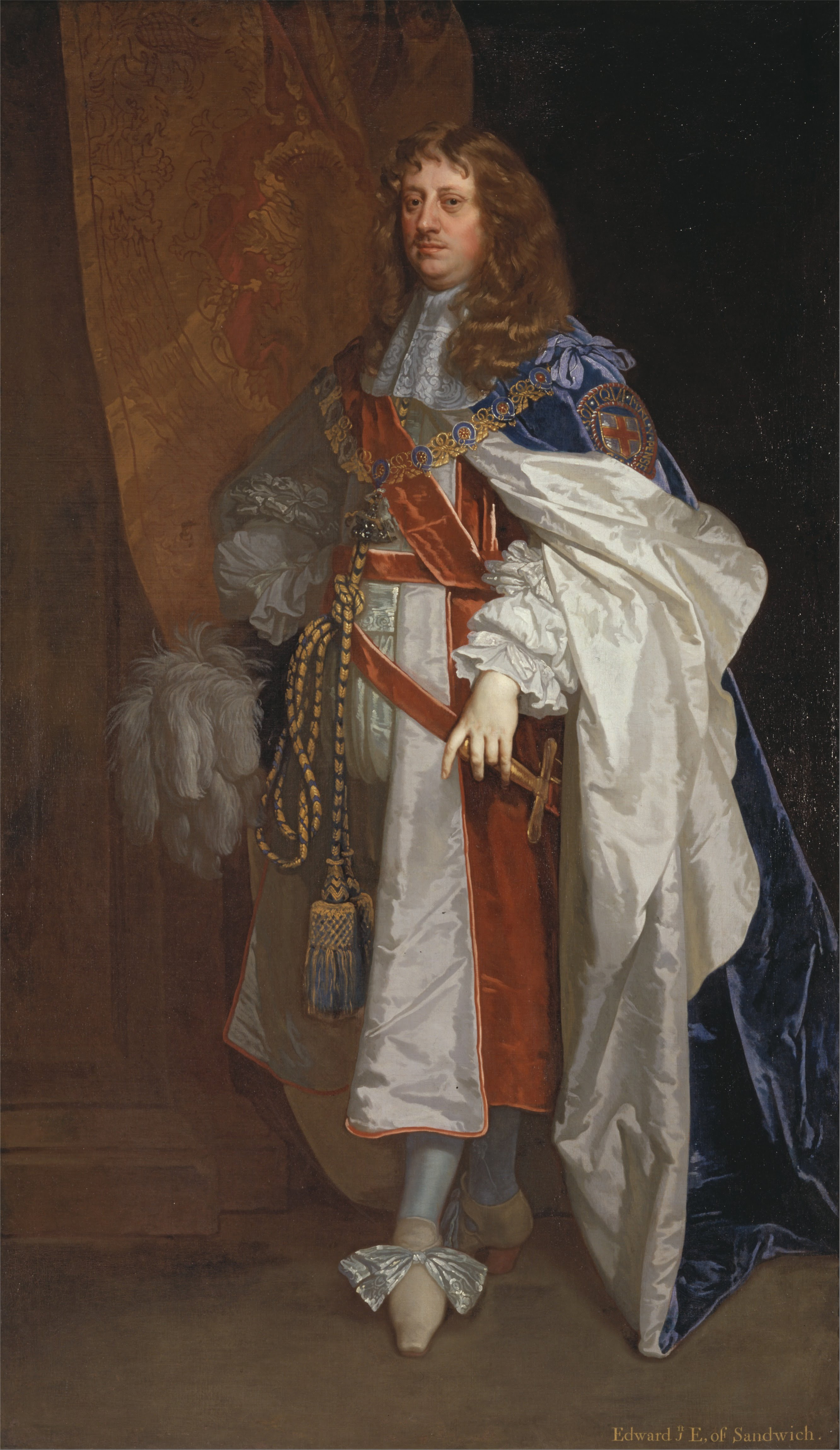
- Portrait by Sir Peter Lely, 1660–1665

Ambassador to Spain
- In office 1666–1668

Ambassador to Portugal
- In office 1661–1662

Joint Lord Lieutenant of Huntingdonshire
- In office September 1660 – May 1672

Member of Parliament for Dover
- In office May 1660 – August 1660

General at sea
- In office 1656–1660

English Council of State
- In office 1653–1659

Member of Parliament for Huntingdonshire
- In office October 1645 – December 1657

Personal details
- Born: 27 July 1625 Barnwell, Northamptonshire, England
- Died: 28 May 1672 (aged 46) Sole Bay, Suffolk, England
- Resting place: Westminster Abbey
- Spouse: Jemimah Crew (m. 1642)
- Children: 10, including Edward, Sidney, and John
- Parent(s): Sir Sidney Montagu; Paulina Pepys
- Occupation: Army and naval officer, diplomat

Military service
- Battles/wars: Wars of the Three Kingdoms; Marston Moor; Siege of York; Second Newbury; Battle of Naseby; Bristol; Anglo-Spanish War (1654–1660); Dunkirk; Second Anglo-Dutch War; Lowestoft; Vågen; Third Anglo-Dutch War; Battle of Solebay †

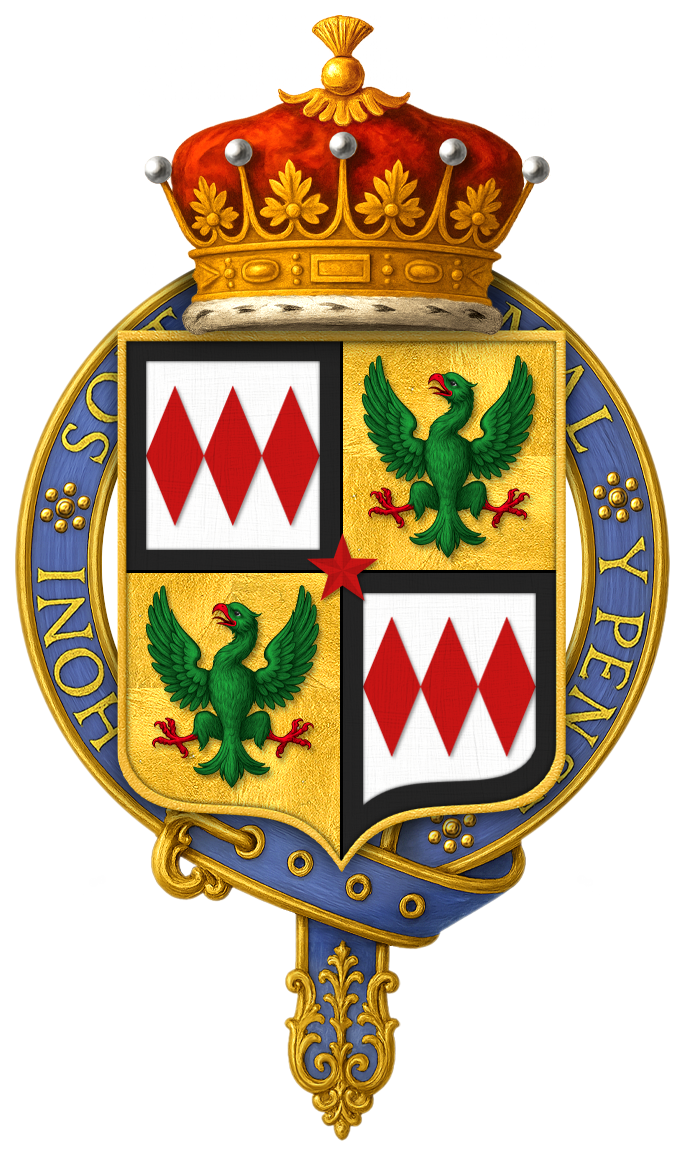
Quartered arms of Sir Edward Montagu, 1st Earl of Sandwich, KG

Edward Montagu, 1st Earl of Sandwich (27 July 1625 – 28 May 1672), was an English military officer, politician and diplomat from Barnwell, Northamptonshire. During the First English Civil War he served with the Parliamentarian army, and was a member of the Parliament of England at various times between 1645 and 1660. Under the Protectorate, he was also a member of the English Council of State and General at sea.

In the political infighting that followed the death of Oliver Cromwell in 1658, he played an important role in bringing about the Stuart Restoration in May 1660. Created Earl of Sandwich by Charles II, he served as Ambassador to Portugal from 1661 to 1662. He was appointed Ambassador to Spain in 1666 and helped to negotiate the 1667 Treaty of Madrid.

When the Second Anglo-Dutch War began in 1665, he commanded a naval squadron but was later suspended in a dispute over prize money. He was restored to command when the Third Anglo-Dutch War began in May 1672, but was killed at the Battle of Solebay in June. Montagu is one of the best-known characters of the 1660s, being a central figure in the diaries of his distant cousin the naval official Samuel Pepys.

== Personal details ==
Edward Montagu was born on 25 July 1625 as the only surviving son of Sir Sidney Montagu (c. 1572–1644) and his first wife, Paulina Pepys (died 1638), great-aunt of Samuel Pepys. On 7 November 1642 Edward married Jemimah Crew, daughter of John Crew, 1st Baron Crew, and Jemima Waldegrave, whom Pepys in his diary refers to with great affection as "My Lady". The couple had ten children:

- Jemima (1646–1671)
- Edward (1648–1688)
- Paulina (1649–1669)
- Sidney (1650–1727)
- Oliver (c. 1655–1689)
- John (c. 1655–1729)
- Charles (1658–1721)
- Anne (1660–1729)
- Catherine (1661–1757)
- James (b. 1664)

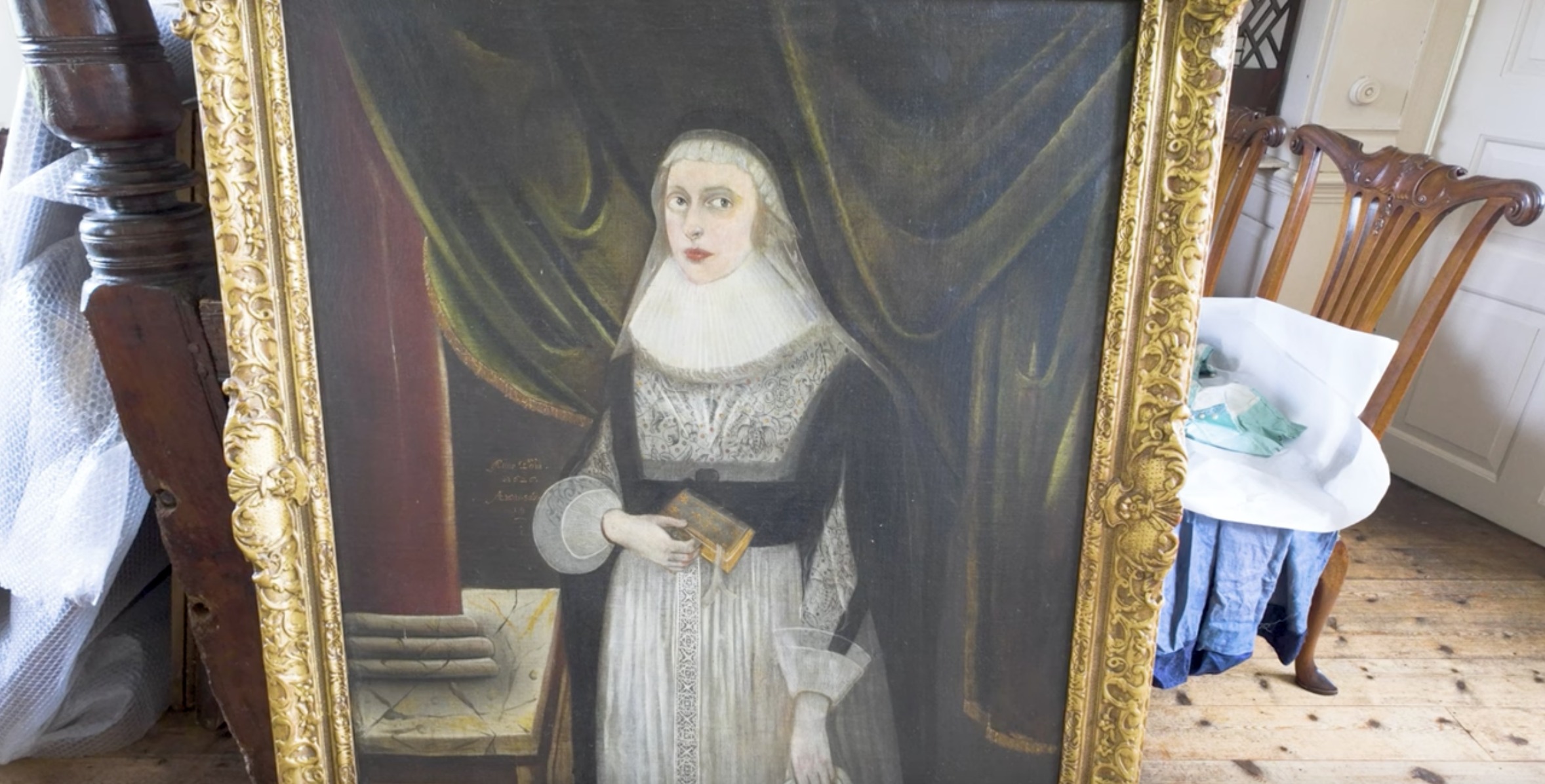
Paulina Pepys, Mother of the First Earl of Sandwich

Paulina's death in February 1669, aged only twenty, was a great source of grief to her father. Pepys, who called her "a peevish lady", called to pay his condolences, but found him "shut away for sorrow".

== First English Civil War and Interregnum ==
Although his father was a Royalist, when the First English Civil War began in August 1642, Montagu served in the Eastern Association army led by his Parliamentarian cousin, the Earl of Manchester. He raised a regiment of infantry which during the 1644 campaign fought at Marston Moor, the Siege of York and Second Newbury. Despite his family relationship, Montagu supported those in Parliament who expressed dissatisfaction with the conduct of the war by Manchester and Essex.

This resulted in the creation of the New Model Army in February 1645 and the passing of the Self-denying Ordinance, requiring those holding military commissions to resign from Parliament. As members of the House of Lords, Manchester and Essex were automatically removed, since unlike MPs they could not resign their titles. Montagu's regiment was incorporated into the New Model, taking part in the June 1645 Battle of Naseby, followed by the capture of Bristol. In October he resigned from the army as required by the Ordinance when was appointed MP for Huntingdonshire, a seat formerly held by his father who died in September 1644.

Montagu played no part in the Second English Civil War and retired from Parliament after Pride's Purge in December 1648 to live quietly at home. He returned to politics in 1653 when his neighbour Oliver Cromwell nominated him to the Barebones Parliament as MP for Huntingdonshire, a seat formerly held by his father who died in September 1644. He was also appointed to the English Council of State, an office he held until it was dissolved in 1659, and was re-elected to the First Protectorate Parliament in 1654, then the Second Protectorate Parliament in 1656.

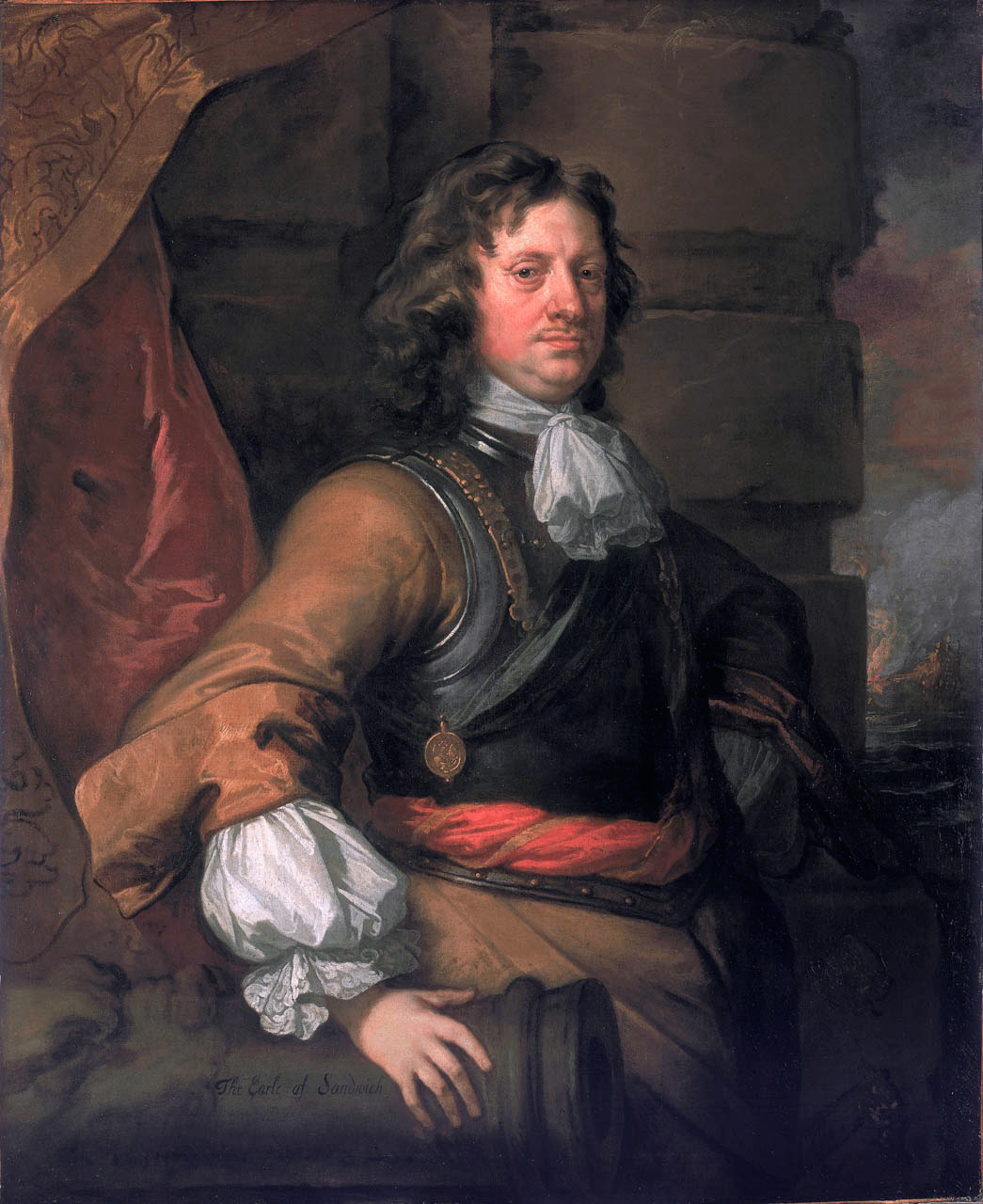
Portrait of Sandwich by Sir Peter Lely, painted 1666, part of the Flagmen of Lowestoft series.

During the Anglo-Spanish War (1654–1660), he was appointed joint General at Sea with Robert Blake, taking part in an expedition into the Mediterranean. This experience made him a leading advocate of establishing a British naval base in the region, an ambition realised with the acquisition of English Tangier in 1661. In February 1657, he was one of the so-called "New Cromwellians" who supported the Humble Petition and Advice, inviting Cromwell to declare himself king and advocating the re-establishment of a national church. The measure was opposed by army radicals including Charles Fleetwood and John Lambert and ultimately rejected.

In June 1658 he commanded the naval squadron that blockaded Dunkirk and when Cromwell died in September, Montagu remained loyal to his son and appointed successor Richard Cromwell. During his brief and disastrous rule as Lord Protector, Montagu remained at sea and in early 1659 was sent to mediate between Sweden and Denmark; however, he was suspected of secret communication with the exiled Charles II and the republicans Algernon Sidney and Sir Robert Honywood were sent to monitor his activity. He was recalled and investigated by the newly installed Rump Parliament; although no evidence was found, he was dismissed from command.

== Restoration ==
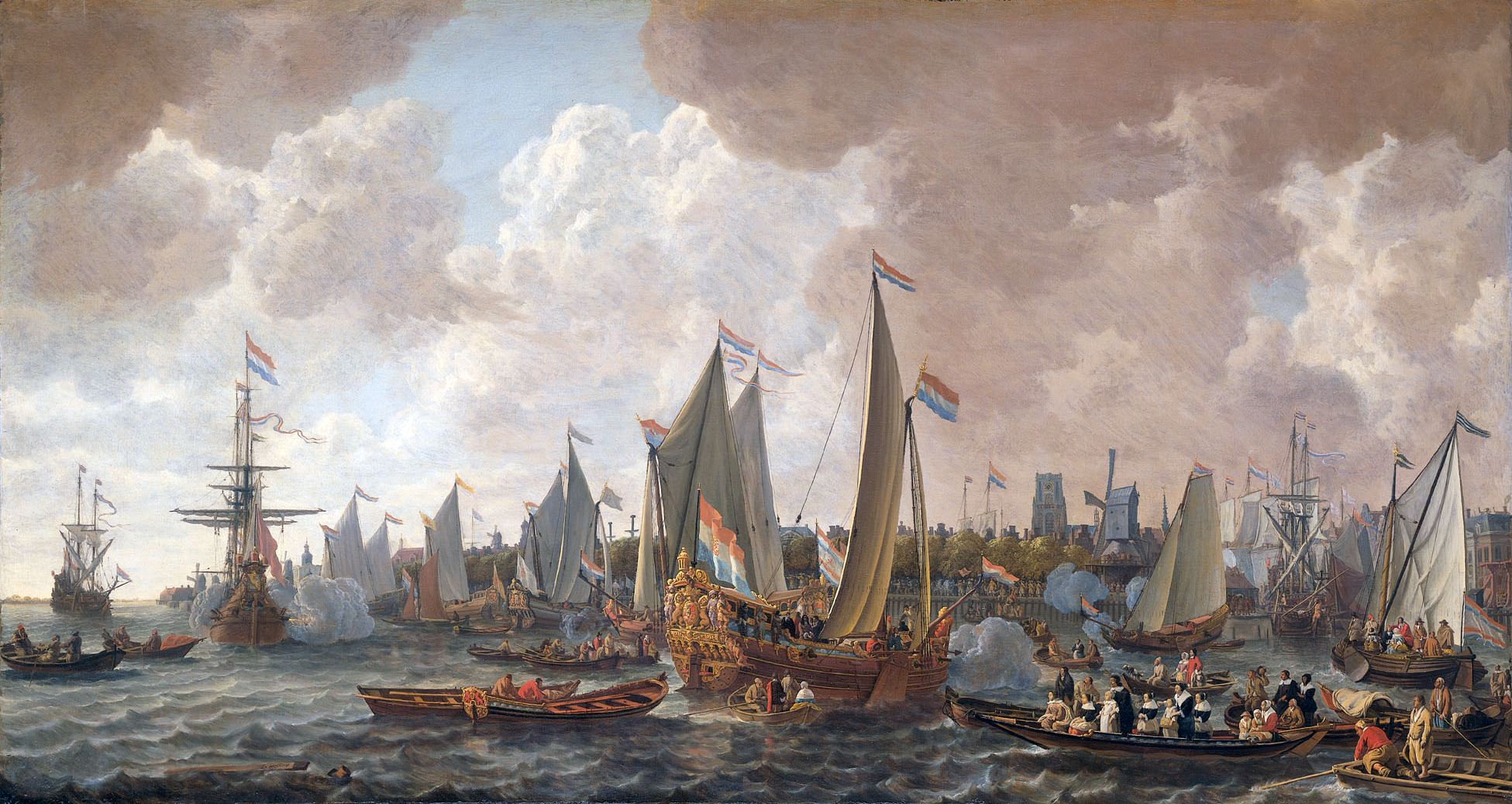
Charles leaves the Dutch Republic for England, 24 May 1660

By the end of 1659 England appeared to be drifting into anarchy, with widespread demands for new elections and an end to military rule. In February 1660, George Monck, military commander in Scotland, marched into London and declared his support for the Rump against the Republican faction led by John Lambert. Montagu resumed command of the navy and was returned as MP for the important port of Dover when elections were held for a Convention Parliament in April.

This placed him in a powerful position during negotiations for the Restoration; when Parliament resolved to proclaim Charles king and invited him to return to England, Montagu commanded the fleet that brought him from the Dutch Republic on 24 May. Two months later, on 12 July 1660, he was created Baron Montagu of St Neots, Viscount Hinchingbrooke, and Earl of Sandwich. King Charles also made him a Knight of the Garter and appointed him Master of the Great Wardrobe, Admiral of the narrow seas (the English Channel and southern North Sea), and Lieutenant Admiral to The Duke of York, Lord High Admiral of England. He carried St. Edward's staff at Charles' subsequent coronation. Edward Hyde, 1st Earl of Clarendon, who liked and admired Sandwich, wrote that the conferring of these honours caused much resentment among those Royalists who had gone into exile with their King, and regarded Sandwich as a "diehard" Cromwellian; yet adds that his charm of manner made it almost impossible to dislike him.

He was appointed Ambassador to Portugal in 1661, and strongly favoured the Portuguese marriage, through which England obtained Mumbai and Tangier. Sandwich, like others, saw a great future for Tangier as an international trade centre, and he commanded the fleet which took possession of the city in January 1662, purchasing a house there. Returning to England, in his capacity as Ambassador, he escorted the new Queen, Catherine of Braganza, from Lisbon.

Montagu was a signatory to The Several Declarations of The Company of Royal Adventurers of England Trading into Africa, a document published in 1667 which led to the expansion of the Royal Africa Company.

== The Prize Goods Scandal ==
In the Second Anglo-Dutch War of 1665 to 1667 he fought at the Battle of Lowestoft, an English victory, but defeat at the Battle of Vågen led to him being removed from active service. His reputation suffered another serious blow when he failed to prevent his sailors from plundering a number of Dutch VOC prize ships, loaded with precious spices from the East Indies, which he had brought in. By long-standing custom the sailors could take any goods they found between the decks, but they were strictly forbidden to "break the bulk" i.e. ransack the ship's hold; yet this is just what Sandwich, an easy-going man with a notoriously poor understanding of money matters, permitted. When this became widely known, the rumour spread that Sandwich had unlawfully helped himself to a fortune (in fact he seems to have taken less than he was entitled to), and the public, who were still enduring the horrors of the Great Plague of London, reacted with such unexpected fury that a minor mishap became a national affair: "the Prize Goods Scandal". Although Clarendon wrote that Sandwich was too likeable to have any personal enemies, he did have political opponents, including his own superior at the Admiralty, James, Duke of York, and James' influential secretary Sir William Coventry, who were happy to exploit the scandal. He felt obliged to obtain a royal pardon: the King, mindful of his good services at the Restoration, willingly granted it.

== Ambassador to Spain ==
During his absence from battle, Sandwich served as England's ambassador to Spain, replacing Sir Richard Fanshawe. This is further evidence that despite his unpopularity, he retained the King's confidence, although his political fortunes, like those of his friend and patron Clarendon, were in decline. Sandwich himself had told Pepys the previous year not to put too much reliance on the friendship of any "great man". After the Great Fire of London Sandwich downplayed the damage to the Spanish King, claiming that London's slums were the only thing in ashes. This slant on the events was also practised by England's ambassadors throughout Europe.

As Ambassador his most notable achievement was the Anglo-Spanish Commercial Treaty of 1667, which laid the foundations for a prosperous trading relationship between the two countries which lasted for over a century. He also acted as mediator in the peace negotiations between Spain and Portugal which resulted in the Treaty of Lisbon. Like all Ambassadors of the era, he found the cost of running an embassy ruinous (he had never had a good head for business) and on his return to England in the autumn of 1668 one of his first actions was to borrow money from his cousin Samuel Pepys. On his way back from Spain, he again visited Tangier to report on the condition of the garrison there.

In 1670 he escorted the King's sister Henrietta of England, Duchess of Orleans, from France to England to negotiate the Secret Treaty of Dover between her brother and Louis XIV. Of the existence of the Treaty's secret clauses, notably that by which Charles II pledged to convert to the Roman Catholic faith, Sandwich, like the general public, was quite unaware. In the same year he was appointed President of the Privy Council Committee on Foreign Plantations; he had always had a keen interest in international trade, despite his notorious inability to keep his own finances in order.

== Last campaign and death ==
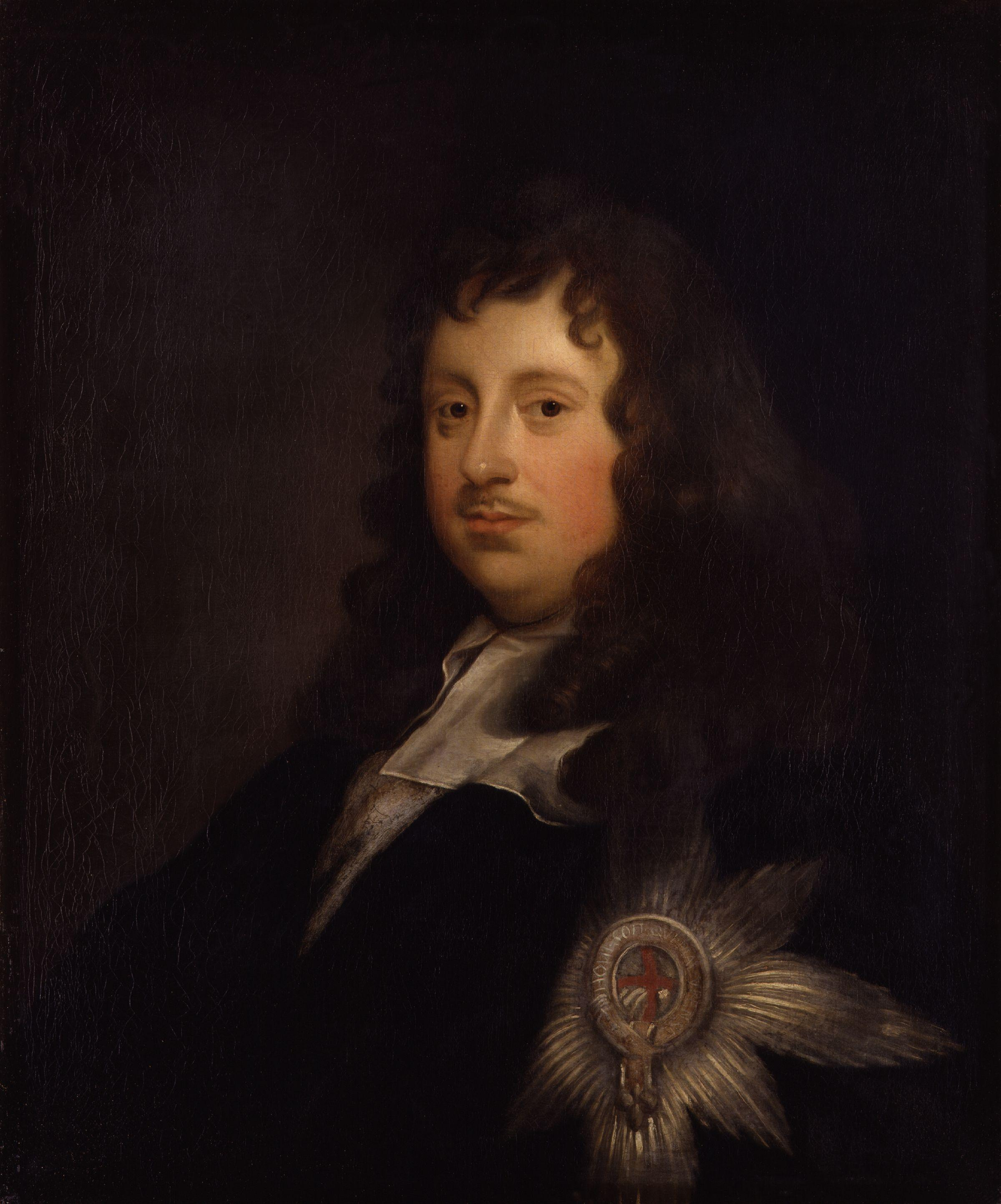
Montagu in the 1660s

He was subsequently reappointed to a naval command, and by 1672 at the start of the Third Anglo-Dutch War, he was Vice-Admiral of the Blue with the Royal James as his flagship. At the Battle of Solebay on 28 May, his ship was attacked by a group of fire ships and was destroyed with the loss of many lives, including Sandwich himself. His body was washed ashore a week later, recognisable only from his clothing; it was unmarked and he appeared to have drowned. Sandwich opposed the war and is said to have predicted his own death. Certainly, he told his friend John Evelyn, just before he sailed, that "he would see him no more".

On Wednesday 3 July 1672 he was buried in Westminster Abbey after a state funeral that started with a procession along the River Thames of five decorated barges from Deptford. His body was landed at Westminster at about 5 pm and carried to the Abbey in a grand procession.

== Sandwich and Samuel Pepys ==
Sandwich on his mother's side was the first cousin of John Pepys, the father of Samuel Pepys. Pepys started his career as a minor member of the Sandwich household and owed his appointments first to the Wardrobe and then as Clerk of the Acts to the Navy Board to Sandwich's influence. Pepys' diary provides a detailed primary source of Sandwich's career in the 1660s.

They had a serious quarrel in 1663, when Pepys reprimanded Sandwich for living openly with his mistress, Elizabeth Becke, at her "mean house" in Chelsea. Pepys was concerned at the damage to their family's reputation, Sandwich's neglect of his official duties (thus risking the loss of any remaining influence he had at Court) and also at the insult to Sandwich's wife, to whom Pepys was deeply attached. Following a brief estrangement, friendly relations were resumed, although the two men were probably never as close again as they had been (Pepys, for example, is not mentioned in Sandwich's last will). For Pepys to raise the issue at all took considerable courage, considering how much he owed to his patron, and his Diary shows that he was strongly tempted to let the matter lie. Even when he did raise it he chose to write rather than confront Sandwich face to face.

In 1668 Pepys was somewhat perturbed when his wife Elizabeth, during one of the violent quarrels which followed the discovery of his affair with her companion Deb Willet, told him that Sandwich had asked her to be his mistress. Since Pepys was in no doubt that she had refused, he decided to treat the matter as being closed, and friendly relations continued: Sandwich dined at their house for the first time a few months later. Pepys, on reflection, may have thought it possible that Elizabeth in her anger had invented the story to upset him, (as she undoubtedly invented the story that she was attending Roman Catholic services). Whatever their differences, Pepys in later life always remembered Sandwich, whom he called "that noble and unparalleled Lord", and his wife (who died in 1674) with affection and gratitude.

== Sources ==
- Catterall, Ralph C H (1903). "The Failure of the Humble Petition and Advice". American Historical Review. 9 (1): 36–65. doi:10.2307/1834218. JSTOR 1834218.
- Corbett, Sir Julian S (1904). England in the Mediterranean: A Study of the Rise and Influence of British Power within the Straits 1603-1713 Volume II. Longmans, Green..
- Cotton, ANB (1975). "Cromwell and the Self-Denying Ordinance". History. 62 (205): 211–231. doi:10.1111/j.1468-229X.1977.tb02337.x. JSTOR 24411238.
- Davies, JJ (2004). "Montagu [Mountagu], Edward, first earl of Sandwich". Oxford Dictionary of National Biography (online ed.). Oxford University Press. doi:10.1093/ref:odnb/19010. (Subscription, Wikipedia Library access or UK public library membership required.)
- Harris, Frank Reginald (1912). The Life of Edward Mountagu, K.G.: First Earl of Sandwich (1625-1672). J. Murray.
- Healy, Simon (2010). MONTAGU, Sidney (c.1572-1644), of Hemington, Northants. and the Middle Temple, London; later of Hinchingbrooke House, Hunts. in The History of Parliament: the House of Commons 1604-1629. CUP.
- Henning, Basil (1983). MONTAGU, Edward I (1625-72), of Hinchingbrooke, Hunts. in The History of Parliament: the House of Commons 1660-1690. Brewer & Boydell. Archived from the original on 17 May 2021.
- Hutton, Ronald (1989). Charles II: King of England, Scotland, and Ireland. Clarendon Press. ISBN 0-19-822911-9.
- Latham, Robert (2000). The Diary of Samuel Pepys: Volume X – Companion. Harper Collins. ISBN 978-0004990309.
- Ollard, Richard Lawrence (1994). Cromwell's Earl : a life of Edward Montagu, 1st Earl of Sandwich. HarperCollins. ISBN 0-00-255003-2.
- Pepys, Samuel (2000). The Diary of Samuel Pepys. Harper Collins. ISBN 978-0004990309.
- Wedgwood, CV (1958). The King's War, 1641-1647 (2001 ed.). Penguin Classics. ISBN 978-0141390727.
- "Montagu Genealogy".
- London Gazette' #691 Monday 1 July, to Thursday 4 July 1672
- The Journal of Edward Montagu, 1st Earl of Sandwich, admiral and general at sea, 1659-1665, edited by R.C. Anderson. Publications of the Navy Records Society, v. 64 (London, 1929).

Court offices
English Interregnum	Master of the Great Wardrobe; 1660–1671	Succeeded by Sir Ralph Montagu
Honorary titles
English Interregnum	Lord Lieutenant of Huntingdonshire jointly with The 2nd Earl of Manchester 1660–1671; The 3rd Earl of Manchester 1671–1672	Succeeded by The 3rd Earl of Manchester
English Interregnum	Custos Rotulorum of Huntingdonshire; 1660–1672	Succeeded by The 3rd Earl of Manchester
Diplomatic posts
Preceded by Sir Richard Fanshawe, 1st Baronet	English Ambassador to Spain; 1666–1666	Succeeded by Robert Spencer, 2nd Earl of Sunderland
Peerage of England
New title	Earl of Sandwich; 1660–1672	Succeeded by Edward Montagu
