= Nicholas Pedley =

English politician (1615–1685)

Sir Nicholas Pedley (17 September 1615 – 6 July 1685) was an English politician who sat in the House of Commons variously between 1656 and 1679.

Pedley was the son of the Reverend Nicholas Pedley of Huntingdonshire and his wife Susan Brathwayte. His grandfather had only a small estate, but his uncle James acquired considerable wealth, which Nicholas inherited. He made an advantageous marriage into the Bernard family, and became accepted as one of the landed gentry of Huntingdonshire. He matriculated from Queens' College, Cambridge at Easter 1633 and was awarded BA in 1637. He was admitted at Lincoln's Inn on 23 April 1638 and was called to the Bar in 1646. He became Recorder of Huntingdon.

In 1656, Pedley was elected Member of Parliament for Huntingdonshire in the Second Protectorate Parliament and was re-elected MP for Huntingdonshire in 1659 for the Third Protectorate Parliament. He was regarded by his colleagues as a legal expert, and was active on those committees which dealt with legal and financial issues, although he rarely spoke in the House.

In 1660, Pedley was elected MP for Huntingdon in the Convention Parliament. He was awarded MA in 1671 and was knighted on 29 February 1672 at a dinner at Sir Francis Goodricke's at Lincoln's Inn. He was elected MP for Huntingdonshire in 1673 and sat until 1679. In 1675 he became Serjeant-at-law.

As a lawyer, he was noted for integrity and impartiality. Although he was no friend to Thomas Osborne, 1st Earl of Danby, Chief Minister from 1673 to 1679, during Danby's impeachment in 1678 he urged Parliament to act strictly according to the letter of the law. He expressed doubts as to whether any of the charges against Danby amounted to treason, and recommended moderation and clemency: "where it concerns a person's blood we ought to be tender".

Pedley lived at Abbotsley, Huntingdonshire. He died at the age of 69. He had married firstly Lucy Bernard, daughter of Sir Robert Bernard, 1st Baronet and his first wife Elizabeth Tallakerne, by whom he had eight children, and secondly Anne Dorrington, daughter of Richard Dorrington and widow of Lawrence Torkington, but had no issue by his second marriage.

Parliament of England
Preceded by Edward Montagu; Stephen Pheasant; Henry Cromwell	Member of Parliament for Huntingdonshire; 1656–1659; With: Edward Montagu 1656; Henry Cromwell 1656–1659	Succeeded by Restored Rump parliament
