= Salway Ash =

Village in Dorset, England

Coordinates: 50.768°N 02.773°W

- Location within Dorset
- OS grid reference: SY4596
- Civil parish: Netherbury
- Unitary authority: Dorset
- Ceremonial county: Dorset
- Region: South West
- Country: England
- Sovereign state: United Kingdom
- Police: Dorset
- Fire: Dorset and Wiltshire
- Ambulance: South Western

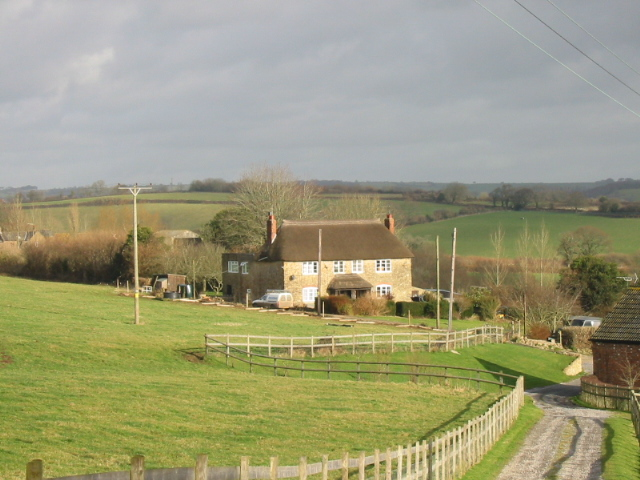
Brinsham Farm, Salway Ash

Salway Ash (also spelt Salwayash) is a village in Dorset, England. It is located on the B1362 between South Bowood and Dottery, 2.4 miles north of Bridport.

Holy Trinity Church was built there in 1887–89.

== Transport ==
The B3162 road passes through the village, connecting it to Bridport and Chard. This road is often used as it connects with the A358, providing the fastest route between Bridport and Junction 25 of the M5 at Taunton.

The village is not served by any railway, and bus services are limited to the public school bus route First Hampshire & Dorset 6A linking the village to Beaminster School.

== Education ==
Around half a mile north of the village lies the Salway Ash C Of E Primary School, the only school in the village. Children then go onto secondary schools such as The Sir John Colfox Academy locally, however they can also attend other secondary schools within the region: The Woodroffe School in Lyme Regis, Colyton Grammar School in Devon, and the Thomas Hardye School in Dorchester. This is usually done by the transport connections at Bridport Bus Station.
