= 2012 Great Britain and Ireland floods =

Series of natural disasters in 2012

2012 Flooding
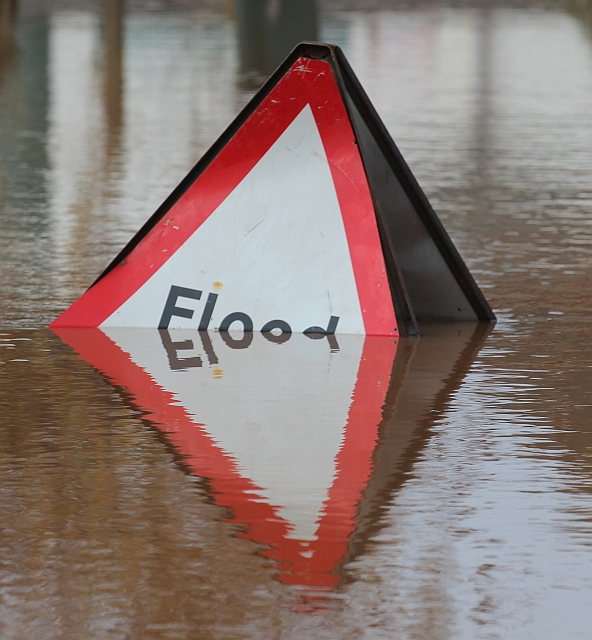
- The road to Hanley Castle, Worcestershire is under water and still rising, November 2012.
- Date: April 2012 – Early 2013
- Location: United Kingdom and Ireland
- Deaths: at least 9
- Property damage: £1 billion (November estimate) €1.2 billion

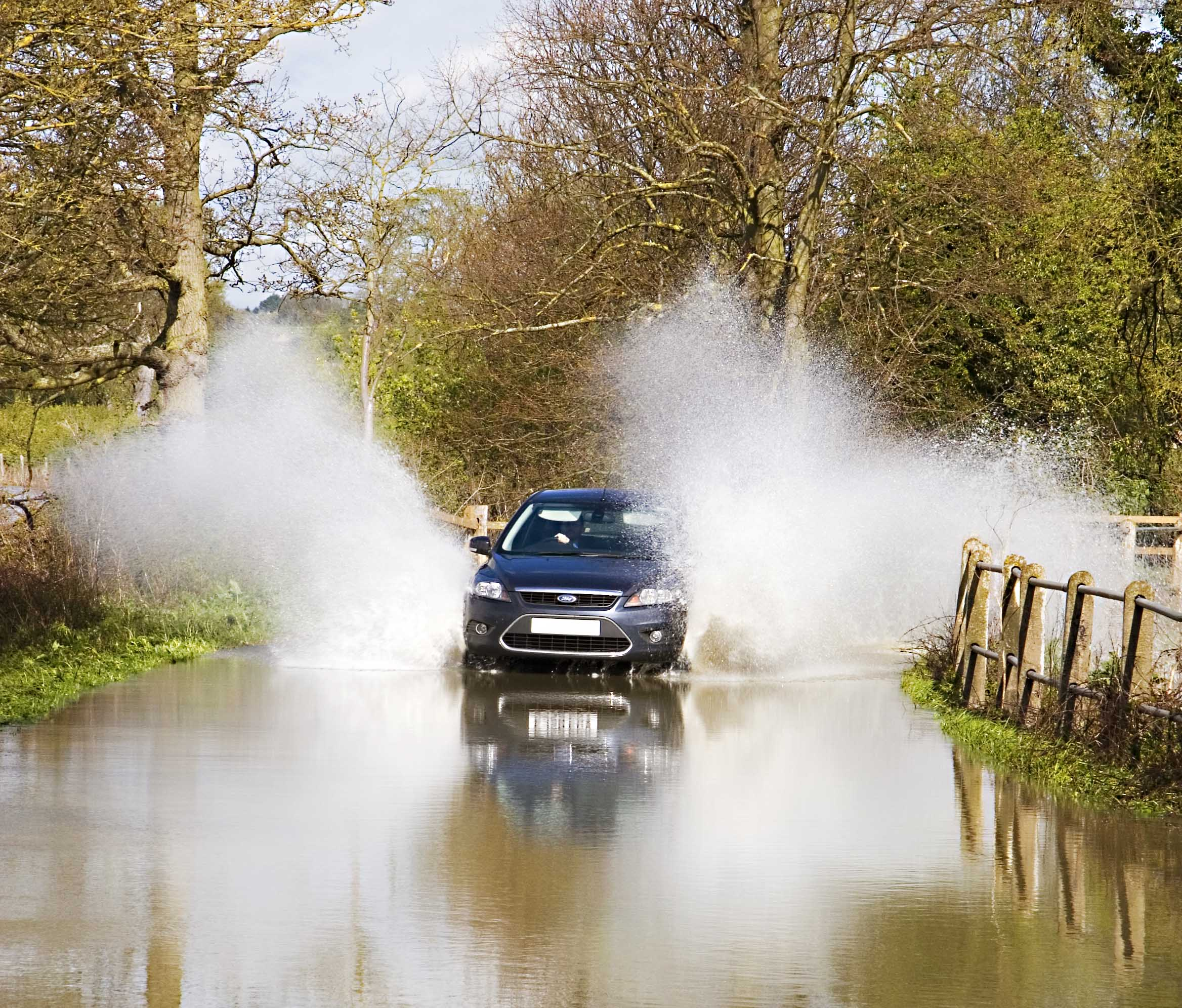
Flooding on the road to Nether Heyford from Upper Heyford Northamptonshire in April.

The 2012 Great Britain and Ireland floods were a series of weather events that affected parts of Great Britain and Ireland periodically during the course of 2012 and on through the winter into 2013. The beginning of 2012 saw much of the United Kingdom experiencing droughts and a heat wave in March. A series of low pressure systems steered by the jet stream brought the wettest April in 100 years, and flooding across Britain and Ireland. Continuing through May and leading to the wettest beginning to June in 150 years, with flooding and extreme events occurring periodically throughout Britain and parts of Atlantic Europe.

On 27 and 28 June and again on 7 July heavy rain events occurred from powerful thunderstorms that gathered strength as they travelled across mainland Britain. Severe weather warnings and a number of flood alerts were issued by the UK's Environment Agency, and many areas were hit by flash floods that overwhelmed properties and caused power cuts. A motorist was killed after his vehicle was caught by floodwater and landslides halted rail services between England and Scotland. The thunderstorms were the product of two fronts that collided over the British Isles – warm air travelling from the Azores and cold water-ladened air from the west. The second batch of flooding struck the South-West of England during the afternoon of 6 July, forcing the Met Office to issue its highest alert, Red (Take Action), due to the significant amounts of rainfall caused by a system travelling from Southern Europe, along with the warm, humid air the United Kingdom had seen in the run-up to the floods, which, like the June floods, caused thunderstorms.

During the Autumn the most intense September low since 1981 brought widespread flooding and wind damage to the UK. Widespread flooding occurred again in November, December and January 2013, as more heavy rains overwhelmed the saturated ground.

== Spring in the UK ==
A series of extratropical cyclones brought the wettest April to many parts of the United Kingdom. Beginning with the storm Gritt (2–11 April 995 hPa) a low system tracking south over the UK and Ireland bringing storm force winds and heavy snowfall just a week after many areas of the UK experienced temperatures above 20 °C (68 °F). 50,000 people were left without power in Northern England, nine Belgian tourists were rescued from blizzards on Ben Macdui, Scotland. A cargo ship ran aground near to Conwy in Wales. The trans-Pennine Woodhead pass route was closed to traffic and the M62 motorway was disrupted. This was followed by the storm Petra (22–29 April 970 hPa) and Queenie (27 April–11 May 988 hPa). Heavy rains led to flooding after a wet April in the UK. 5,000 homes in Wales were without electricity, as winds brought down trees in SW areas of the British Isles. Flood Warnings were in force across much of the UK. A man died after a car became trapped in a Berkshire ford. The wet weather resulted in the cancellation of the Badminton Horse Trials. Towards the end of May there was a brief warm dry period.

== Summer Storms ==
=== June ===
3 June saw the Thames Diamond Jubilee Pageant beleaguered by heavy rain, 46 people from the boats were treated for the effects of the cold weather, and six were taken to hospital with symptoms of hypothermia. On 9 June severe flooding began around Aberystwyth, West Wales with people evacuated from 2 holiday parks, with 150 people saved from lifeboats in 4–5 ft of water.

10–11 June saw a small but active area of low pressure track slowly east through the English Channel, eventually becoming slow moving for almost 24 hours near the Sussex coast. Flooding followed in the villages of Almodington, Somerley and Birdham, with Bracklesham Bay Caravan Park and Sussex Beach Holiday Village in Earnley on the Manhood Peninsula also inundated. Elsewhere in Sussex, flooding occurred at Worthing Hospital and saw basement flats on Littlehampton seafront also under water.

22 June saw over a month's worth of rain fall on areas of the North, with Lancashire, Cumbria and Pennine areas badly hit. Todmorden, Mytholmroyd and Hebden Bridge saw flash floods which halted trains on the Calder Valley line between Leeds and Manchester Victoria, following a landslip and flooding.

The conditions that led to the extreme weather conditions were caused by a warm front blowing northward from the Azores and an eastward travelling cold front that came together over the British Isles. The first of the severe weather brought heavy rainfall to Northern Ireland on the night of 27 June, with Belfast one of the worst affected areas. Two inches of overnight rain from back building thunderstorms caused flash flooding, damaging properties and leaving 1,000 homes without power for several hours. The following day the Northern Ireland Fire and Rescue Service said that it had dealt with 700 flood-related calls, while Finance Minister Sammy Wilson announced that those affected by the floods would be eligible to apply for up to £1,000 in emergency funding. Northern Ireland Water reported that its staff had helped to clear sewage from 158 properties, and said it was on "high alert" to deal with further incidents.

==== 28 June supercell storms ====
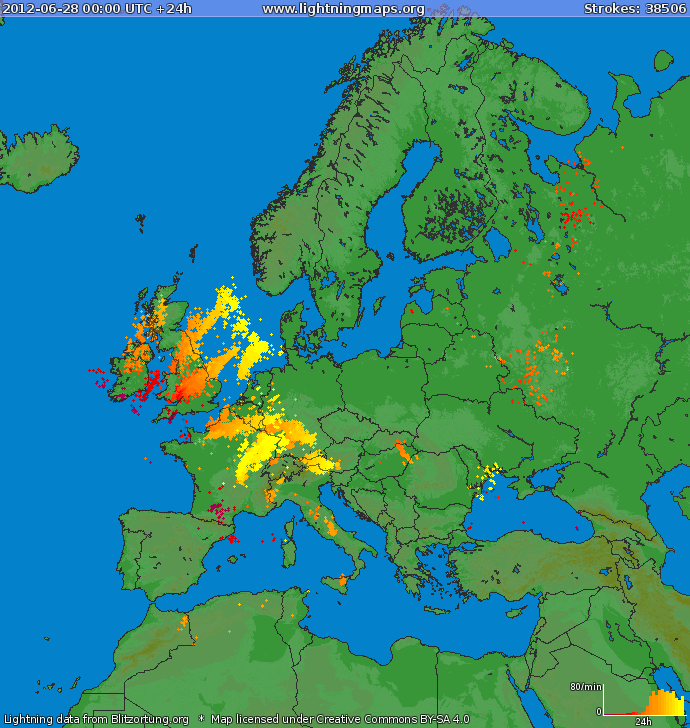
Lightning over Europe 28 June 2012

On the morning of 28 June, supercell thunderstorms developed over Wales shortly after 8.00 a.m., then moved separately across England to the Midlands and the north, leaving a trail of disruption in their wake. At one point the Environment Agency had 10 flood warnings and 47 alerts in place for England, mainly in the Midlands and North, while the Scottish Environment Protection Agency had one flood warning and 12 flood alerts covering many areas.

One storm affected the Midlands, producing hailstones reported to be larger than golfballs, with conglomerate stones up to 10 cm across. Burbage in Leicestershire saw some of the most severe hail. Another supercell produced a tornado near Sleaford, in Lincolnshire. Homes and businesses were damaged as an inch of rain fell in two hours in some areas of the West Midlands. Hailstones as large as golf balls fell in parts of the East Midlands, while the 2012 Olympic torch relay was briefly halted by lightning. A motorist was swept to his death after his vehicle was overwhelmed by flood waters in Shropshire.

Another supercell storm struck Tyneside without warning at the height of the evening rush hour causing widespread damage and travel chaos, locally known as the Toon Monsoon. Flooded shopping malls were evacuated, Newcastle station was closed, as was the Tyne & Wear Metro, and main road routes were flooded leading to massive tailbacks. Drivers were forced to abandon their cars, with many commuters stranded due to public transport closures. Northern Powergrid reported that 23,000 properties were left without electricity in North-East England after flash flooding and lightning storms hit the area. The Tyne and Wear Fire and Rescue Service reported more than 1,500 calls relating to flooding on the night of 28 June. 999 land line services were knocked out in some areas and the damage ran to huge amounts only visible the next day after water cleared. Many parts of County Durham and Northumberland were also affected with thousands of homes across the North East left without power due to lightning strikes. Lightning was filmed striking the Tyne Bridge as motorists were sat gridlocked on it.

Landslides blocked both main East Coast and West Coast rail lines linking England and Scotland. Both lines reopened the following day, but problems with overhead power lines forced a second closure of the West Coast line while maintenance was carried out.

Record rainfall totals in June 2012 beat those of 2007 in the UK, which had itself broken a record which had held for nearly 40 years.

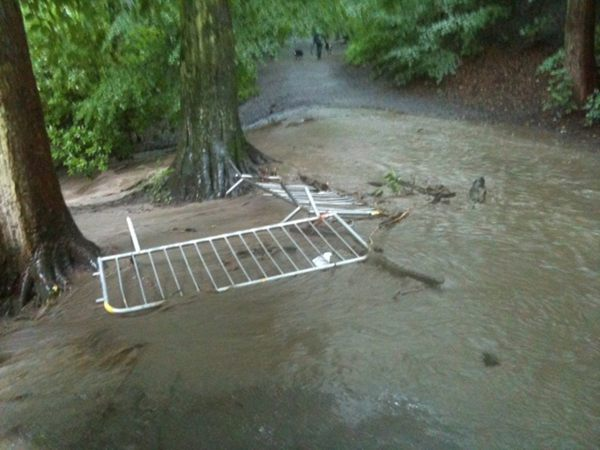
A swollen brook flooding a footpath in Graves Park, Sheffield.

=== July ===
On 6 July, a deep low-pressure system started to spread towards the British Isles. The system struck around 1 p.m. during the day, with the Environment Agency issuing flood alerts & warnings throughout the United Kingdom. South Yorkshire experienced heavy rainfall, and 52 people were evacuated from a care home in Thurnscoe due to a flood warning being issued in the area. An emergency command centre was set up by South Yorkshire Police in Sheffield over fears of flooding in the city, and authorities advised people to avoid the Meadowhall area because of high water levels on the River Don. Severe flooding occurred in the city's Graves Park which led to the collapse of a pedestrian footbridge along the Lower Valley Walk.

The South West of England also suffered from river & surface flooding, and the Met Office placed the region on a red warning for severe weather. Filey lifeboat station rescued six people from an inland caravan park in North Yorkshire which was under 3 feet of floodwater. Officials at Silverstone Circuit on the Northamptonshire/Buckinghamshire border had to turn away thousands of fans attending the Formula 1 Grand Prix qualifying sessions on Saturday 7 July due to heavy rainfall the previous day.

In Dorset a couple were killed when heavy rains caused a landslip and partial collapse of the Beaminster Tunnel. 700 tonnes of mud slid onto the roadway completely covering the vehicle on 7 July. Dorset Police at the time were dealing with 150 flood warnings in the county and the evacuation of 180 houses with 400 incidents reported to police control room. A cursory inspection of the landslip did not reveal the presence of the vehicle and it was not until after the couple were reported as missing that the police re-investigated the debris and found the crushed car on 15 July. The Dorset Police force was criticised for failing to find the bodies sooner and the case was voluntarily referred to the Independent Police Complaints Commission to be reviewed. 8 July brought renewed flash-flooding, to the Upper Calder Valley. This was the third time the area had suffered a deluge, within the space of a fortnight. Todmorden, Hebden Bridge and Mytholmroyd were hit particularly badly. The Weymouth and Portland National Sailing Academy, venue for Sailing at the 2012 Summer Olympics, flooded after a nearby lake burst its banks overnight.

=== August ===
4–5 August saw localised flooding across the UK in Devon, Tyne and Wear, West Yorkshire and Southern Scotland from torrential rains, in places exceeding 30 mm over a short time. This storm crossed the North Sea and was designated as extreme weather event "Frida" by the Norwegian Meteorological Institute. Rainfall totals up to 100 mm in 24 hours across southern Norway and parts of Denmark resulted in flooding and landslips. Towards the end of the month more flash floods were reported in Cumbria, leading to landslides and a derailed train. High waters on the River Ehen tore down the side of a house in Egremont, Cumbria.

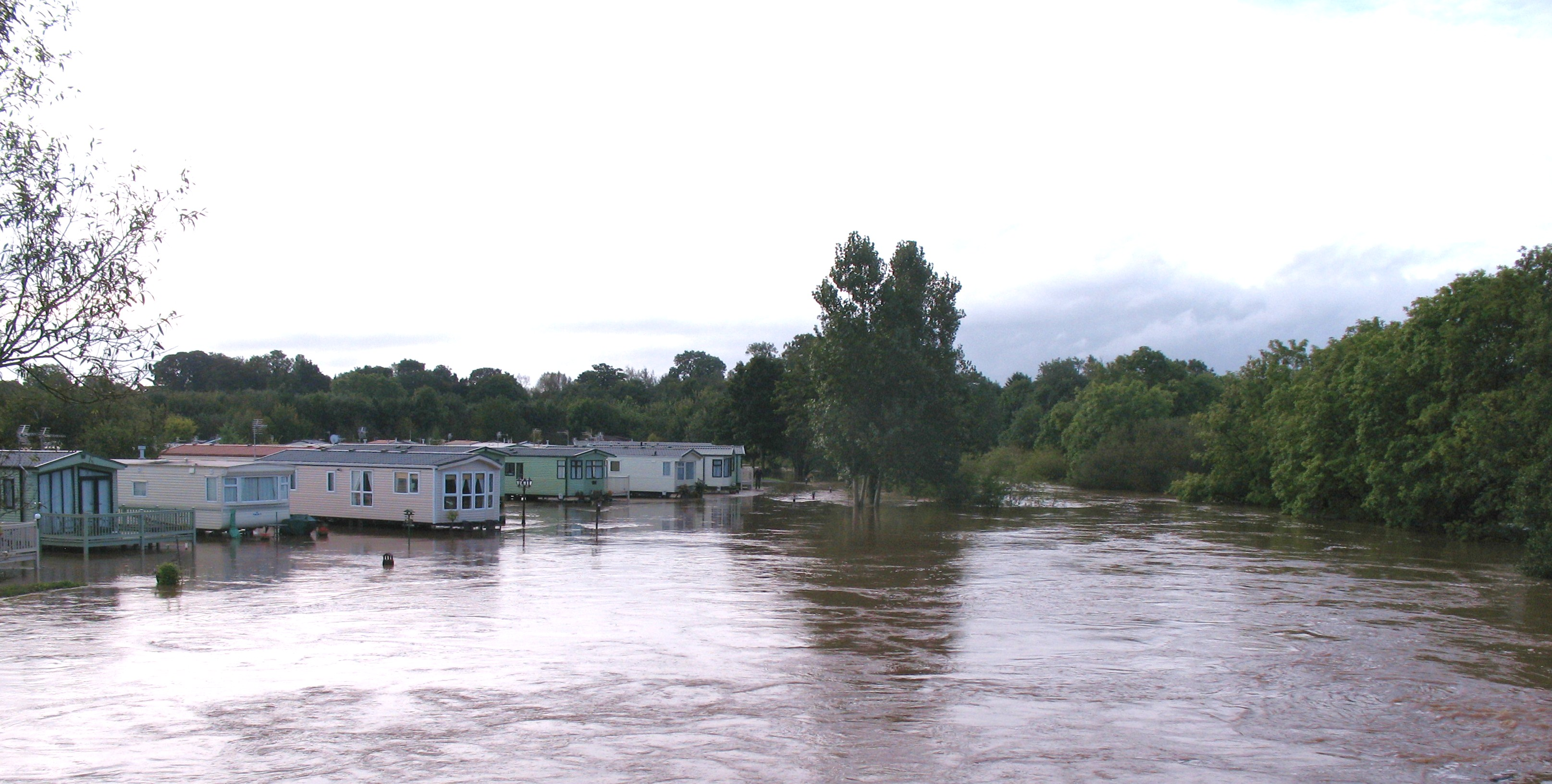
The Swale in flood at Topcliffe, North Yorkshire September 2012

== Autumn ==
=== September ===
570 homes and businesses were flooded in September according to the Environment Agency. The worst hit areas were Wales, Yorkshire and North East England. In Newburn, Newcastle upon Tyne a block of flats was completely undermined by floodwaters leaving the block looking precarious with the pile foundations exposed. Engineering surveys resulted in the likelihood that the homes were unsalvageable, leaving angry residents looking for the landowners and developers to take responsibility. The River Ouse in York reached a peak height of 5.02 m over normal. In North Yorkshire the British Army were called on to deploy sandbags in the village of Cawood to help save homes and businesses. A young couple who were walking their dogs along the River Clywedog near to Wrexham were caught in the flooded waters and drowned. Local authorities were left reeling from the floods asked the government to set up an emergency capital highways maintenance fund to help with the expected cost of bridge, road and infrastructure repairs from the flooding, as they had done during the widespread 2007 United Kingdom floods.

=== October ===
The bad weather and flooded rivers around Machynlleth hindered the search for the missing schoolgirl April Jones. 11 October brought flooding to the Devon village of Clovelly following 5 cm (2 in) of rainfall, a torrent of water cascaded down the steep cobbled main street to the harbour.

=== November ===
On 18 November southern and western Scotland saw intense rainfall which caused localised flooding, the Trossachs, South Argyll and parts of Dumfries and Galloway were particularly badly affected, with widespread reports of local flooding from the towns of Comrie, Dunblane, Aberfoyle and Callander. In Comrie, around 100 properties were affected. The Glasgow area saw more than 50 mm of rain fall and some flooding. The Rest and Be Thankful section of the A83 road in Argyll saw a landslip of an estimated 150 tonnes of material close the road for the fifth time in six years.

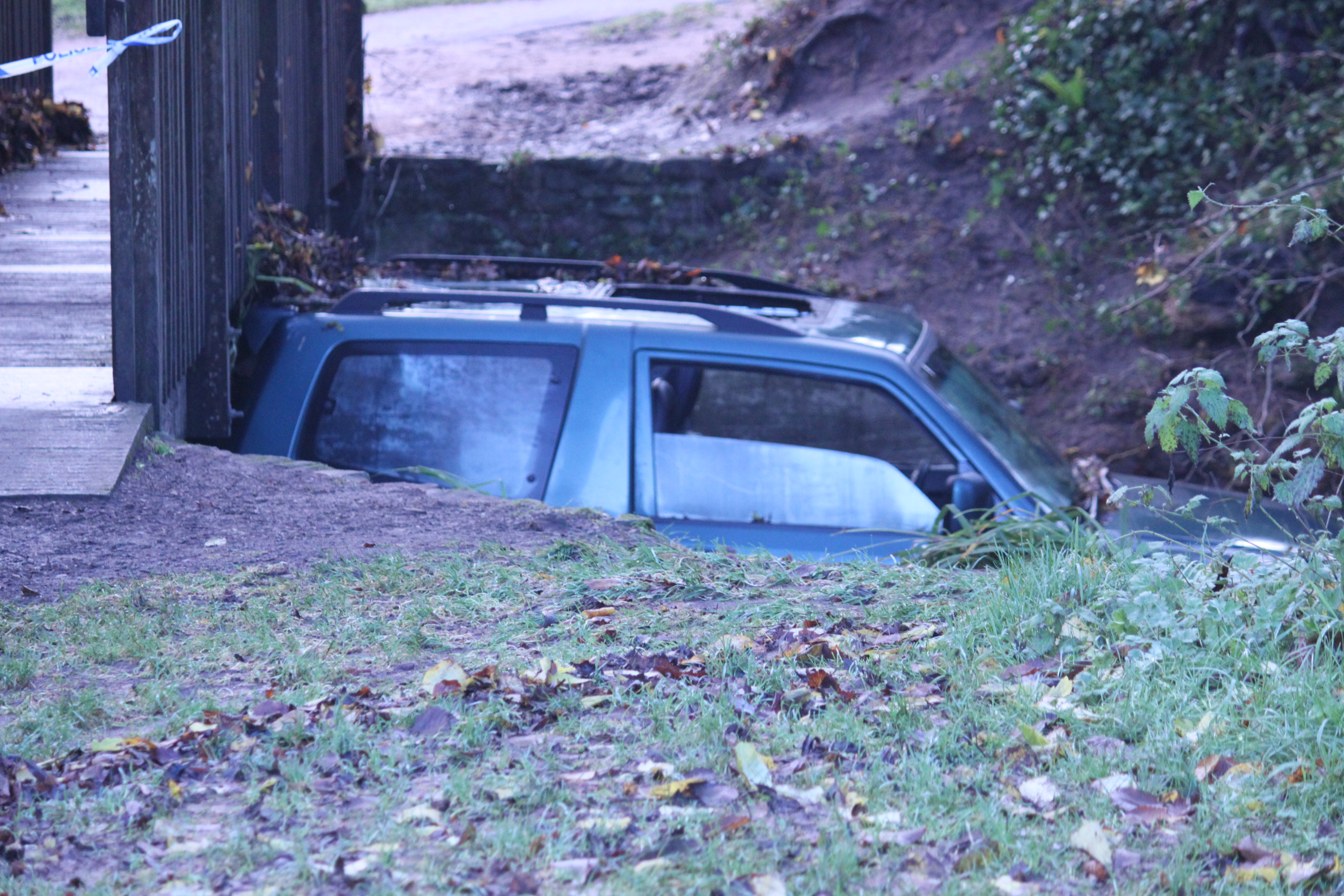
The car in Chew Stoke in which a man died on 22 November

During November a series of floods affected many parts of Britain. On 22 November a man died after his car was washed down a flooded brook in Chew Stoke, Somerset and trapped against a small bridge. A 26-year-old man was also killed as his car overturned in torrential rain in Devon. In Sonning, Berkshire a 91-year-old was apparently witnessed to have gone swimming in the flooded Thames and was missing, feared dead. A Downing Street spokesman said that 300 properties were flooded in 24 hours in England and Wales on 22 November. Heavy rains led to overtopping of the Grand Western Canal near to Halberton, Devon forcing homes to be evacuated as the canal wall breached, spilling the canal contents on lower land. The Environment Agency and Police via the media stressed that motorists should take great care when driving through flood waters after a series of fatalities involving motorists during the flooding of 2012. In Welney, Norfolk a man who posted a video of driving a 4x4 vehicle through deep floodwaters along the closed A1101 road online, was branded as irresponsible and dangerous by Norfolk Police. While Cambridgeshire Police said that drivers who drove through floods and got stuck could face prosecution, after several vehicles were stranded in floodwaters.

England and Wales saw the (provisionally) second wettest week in the last 50 years between 20–26 November, behind only a period October–November 2000. 26 November saw a landslip on Aelfelda Terrace, Whitby, after saturated ground led to failure of the retaining wall. Five terraced houses were later demolished following fears of their collapse, after being condemned. Around 500 houses were flooded, RNLI lifeboats evacuated residents and an elderly woman was found dead in her own property after the River Elwy swelled to 6 ft above its normal level in the town of St Asaph in North Wales on 27 November. The month saw some of the worst floods of the year in many areas of the country.

=== December ===
Early December brought a period of cold settled weather to the UK, which offered some respite from the flooding. On 14 December, low pressure area Nicki brought coastal flooding along the south coast of England and eastern Scotland. Weymouth harbourside was flooded, and 30 homes in Looe were also flooded. Some residents in the Scottish towns of Stonehaven and Peterhead were evacuated. In Kingsbridge, Devon the town centre was flooded after the quay was overtopped and the railway line to Dawlish was disrupted after flooding. £500,000 of damage was caused at North Berwick, Lothian by the waves, with a 15 m section of harbour wall brought down in Lossiemouth.

On 19 December a front from the low Petra brought rainfall, and the following day the Environment Agency ordered the evacuation of the village of Wallington, Hampshire, after fears that cracks in the flood wall could indicate potential failure. A series of weather fronts associated with low pressure areas brought flooding to Helston in Cornwall and Braunton in Devon on the night of 21 December. Multiple landslips occurred in Swanage Dorset, which were caught on camera by the local coastguard, who produced a map of slips and beach closures in the area.

Temporary water-filled dams were deployed in the United Kingdom for the first time to protect the mainline railway at Cowley Bridge Junction, next to the River Exe, some trackbed beyond the dams was washed away on 22 December, putting the line out of action until it was reopened on 28 December. The village of Stoke Canon just upstream saw several homes evacuated. Network Rail advised passengers not to travel west of Taunton, later Tiverton, with both First Great Western and Arriva Trains Wales urging passengers not to travel.

More heavy rainfall in South West England on 22 December brought flooding to Lostwithiel Cornwall, where RNLI flood rescue teams helped evacuate flooded homes. The Tarr Steps, a grade I listed building and scheduled monument in Exmoor National Park, west Somerset was washed away. River levels up to 10 feet (3.0 m) higher than normal and debris snapped the steel cables designed to protect the walkway. Each slab of the bridge is numbered so that the crossing can be reconstructed, which was last done in 2008.

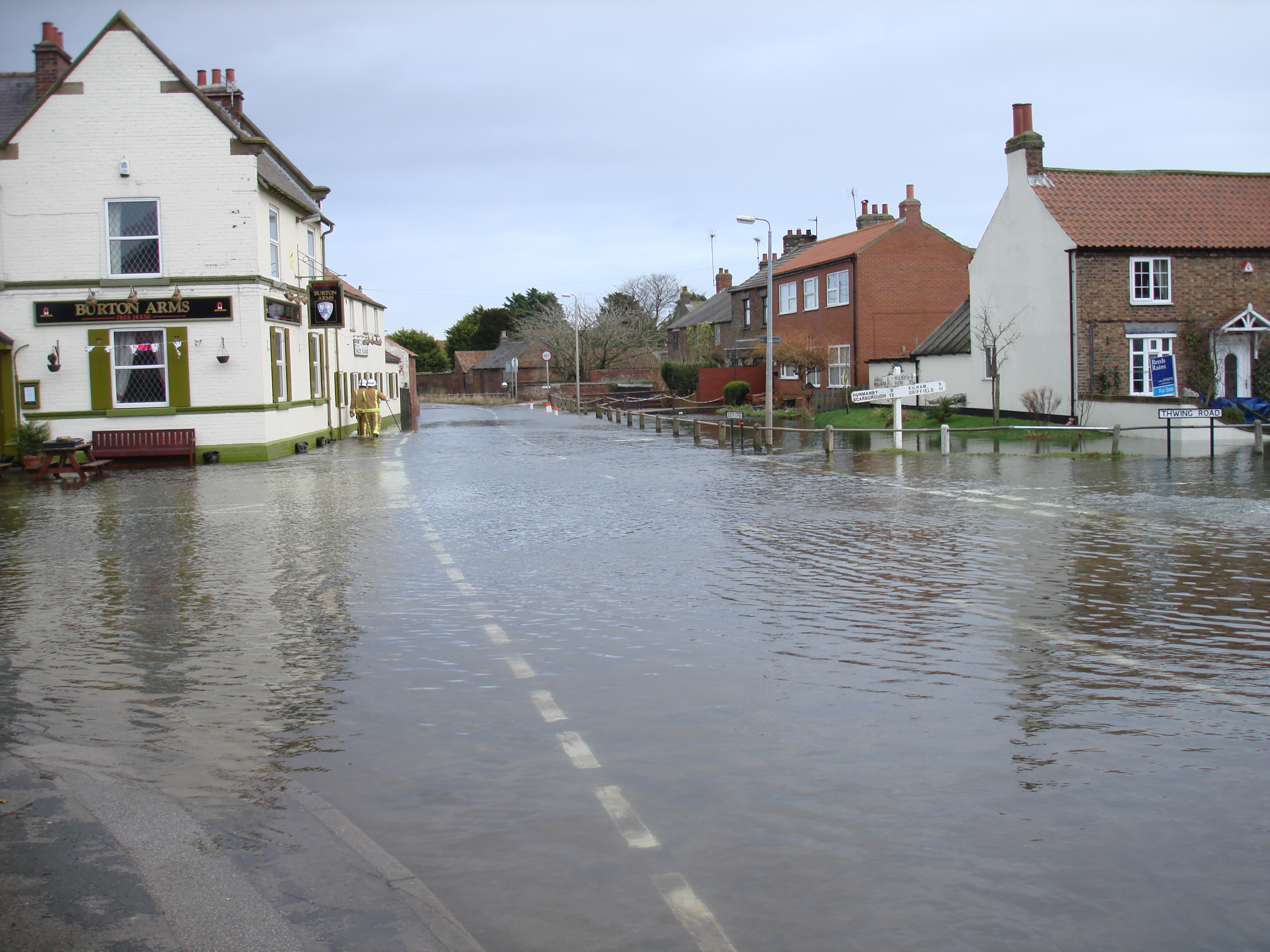
The Gypsey Race floods the village of Burton Fleming due to the saturated ground and rainfall of December 2012.

== Meteorological background ==
The La Niña event which had been ongoing since 2009 in the Pacific finally weakened during March 2012, although many parts of the global oceans and tropical weather patterns still retained characteristics associated with La Niña.

In the Northern Hemisphere the jet stream was very disturbed, resulting in a Rossby wave pattern of high and low pressure regions. During March the UK was positioned under a strong high-pressure region resulting in very dry and warm conditions which brought a heatwave. In April, the wave pattern underwent a significant shift to bring the UK under the influence of strong low pressure, with prevailing south-westerly flow and heavy rainfall.

One of the potential causes of this shift in the Northern Hemisphere circulation may have been associated with a shift in tropical weather patterns. In particular, this may have been caused by a strong Madden–Julian oscillation which occurred in the tropics in March. This is a large-scale tropical phenomenon which leads to disturbed weather patterns over a timescales of typically 30–60 days. These changes originate over the Indian Ocean and may have influenced the northern hemisphere weather regimes, as the Madden–Julian oscillation can be an important predictor of the state of the North Atlantic Oscillation.

The poor summer weather saw the continuation of a southerly tracking jet stream, which showed a similar pattern to that of June and July 2007.

28 June 2012 supercells in the United Kingdom and Belgium brought intense heavy rain which caused flash flooding and further saturated the ground water levels. Meteorologists attributed these storms to convective rain from a Spanish plume weather pattern. Factors involved in the extreme storms of summer 2012 were the relatively high sea-surface temperature in the Atlantic Ocean west of the UK, which increased moisture content of the air as it passed over it and secondly, the persistence of an upper trough (a low pressure in the higher atmosphere) helping the development of strong convection. When these frontal storms along the Rossby waves turned north-eastward, they hit southwest England, Wales, north England and Scotland and across to Scandinavia. The repeated updraft elements merged with the rotating updraft elements within these supercell storms and led to the occurrence of tornadoes and large hail.

== Analysis ==
The rapid change in fortunes from drought to flooding across the country was unique in the weather record, exceeding the change seen after the 1975–1976 drought. With Terry Marsh of the Centre for Ecology & Hydrology (CEH) stating "Sustained recoveries of this magnitude during the late spring and summer have not been seen before," with ground water levels recharging to average, and above average levels during a season when they'd be expected to be declining. An enhanced recharge season was also noted before the Autumn floods of 2000. November to April is generally the wetter half of the year in the British Isles, which means heavy or prolonged winter rainfall presents a heightened risk of flooding as soils and aquifers are already saturated. PricewaterhouseCoopers announced in November that the flooding over the summer of 2012 was likely to cost insurers £500 million, with the overall cost of flooding to insurers for the year estimated at £1 billion ($1.59 billion). In December Aon Benfield gave an updated estimate of the total insurance losses through flooding for the year, which could reach £1.33 billion, with claims of £280 million from the flooding of 10–11 June, £498 million from 23–24 June floods and £50 million on 24–25 September.

The floods came at a time when the Government and the UK insurance industry are re-negotiating a deal to provide affordable insurance to flood prone homes, known as the Statement of Principles, with the current subsidy due to expire in June 2013. The favoured solution for the insurance industry is a levy on low risk homes with the government and taxpayer acting as an insurer of last resort. The Association of British Insurers stated that "The Government has indicated it will not provide any temporary overdraft facility for the insurance industry's not-for-profit scheme, which makes it very difficult for it to go ahead. As a result, negotiations have hit an impasse." Should the issue not be resolved this would leave an estimated 200,000 homes unable to get insurance from June 2013. An alternative being discussed in the insurance industry is the possibility that flood pools may offer a hybrid solution acceptable to both parties. Because of the flooding in 2012, insurance renewal premiums were expected to rise between 10 and 50 percent, depending on the scale of damages suffered. Even those not directly hit by the flooding were likely to see their premiums rise by 5 percent next year. Currently insurers provide flood coverage on the understanding that government invests a certain amount of funds on flood defences, however the spending on flood defences has slipped below the levels seen in 2008.

The floods came in the wake of government cuts to flood protection, which had seen 294 flood defence schemes cut, which had indicative funding in place in 2010, with major schemes in Leeds, Thirsk, Ipswich, Fleetwood and Croston and Lancashire not built. The UK government announced on 30 November that £120 million of new funding would be released to speed up building of 50 flood defences by Defra, which would prioritize schemes in Leeds city centre, Sheffield, Exeter, Derby and Ipswich. Anne McIntosh MP for Thirsk and Malton and vice-president of the Association of Drainage Authorities questioned whether the government had prioritized the right schemes in their announced package of new funding. Noting that the Pitt Review of the UK floods of 2007 demanded that Government prove rivers are being dredged regularly, she raised the issue of whether this could be maintained as the maintenance spend of the Environment Agency was being cut.

== Aftermath ==
=== Outdoor events cancellations ===
- May
  - Badminton Horse Trial
- June
  - Suffolk Show 2012, cancelled on second day due to high winds and rain.
- July
  - Great Yorkshire Show 2012, cancelled after one day due to torrential rain.
  - MFest Harewood House Leeds, Music Festival.
  - Wellingborough Carnival
  - Cliffhangar Festival, Graves Park, Sheffield.
  - CLA Game Fair, Belvoir Castle Lincolnshire.
- August
  - Creamfields dance music festival, Daresbury, Cheshire cancelled after arena and campsite flooded.
  - England Scotland one day international cricket cancelled in Edinburgh, after The Grange Club flooded in July.
- November
  - Southwell Racecourse Nottinghamshire, racecourse closed until February.
- January
  - Cheltenham Racecourse cancelled New Year's Day meeting due to waterlogged course.
  - Huntingdon Racecourse

It was estimated that in July the cost of cancelled events could cost the rural economy £240 million.

=== Landslides ===
The heavy rainfall and resulting saturated ground provided conditions which led to a greater risk of landslides. On 27 December the British Geological Survey and Met Office gave a rare landslide warning for the southwest of England. December saw an amber warning situation resulting from saturated ground conditions, with forecasts of more heavy rainfall and multiple reports of slope instability resulting in likely disruption to infrastructure and people. The British Geological Survey monitor incidents of landslip and produced data indicating that the April and June rainfall resulted in a fourfold increase in landslides and slope failures in July against what would be usually expected, with a similarly large increase in landslides towards the end of the year. The BGS team mapped a large concentration of landslips in the southwest of England, a region frequently experiencing flooding during the year, showing a correlation of landslides and rainfall anomaly during 2012. Landslides occurred as a result of water loading of slopes, reducing soil strength and/or removal of soil particles or other material changes in the slopes.

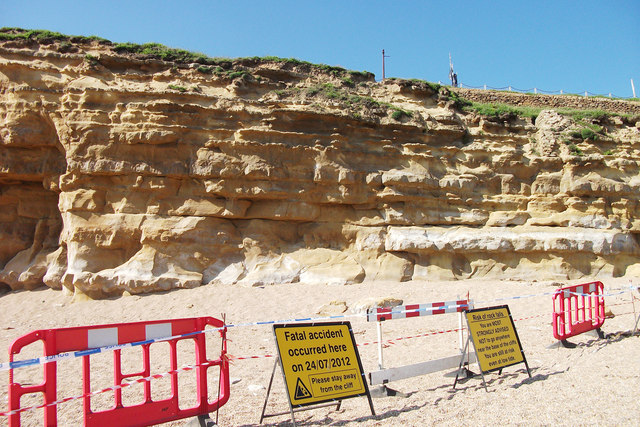
Burton Beach, Burton Bradstock, Dorset, the scene of a fatal landslide on 24 July 2012.

- 28 June landslides blocked both the East Coast Main Line and West Coast Main Line railways.
- 7 July Partial Collapse of Beaminster Tunnel during heavy rains, two fatalities as a car caught under the debris.
- 25 July Burton Bradstock, Dorset a cliff collapse fatally injures a tourist on Burton Beach.
- 30 August Northern Rail train derails after hitting a landslip near to St Bees Head, Cumbria.
- November, Whitby, landslides at Aelfaeda Terrace and later around the headland at Henrietta Street.
- 29 November a failed railway embankment near Bristol interrupts service towards Birmingham and Swindon.
- 29 November Teignmouth Devon.
- 21 December Perth.
- December 2012 Totland, Isle of Wight landslide and seawall damage.
- 3 January 2013 Corton, Suffolk.
- 12 February 2013 slope failure at Hatfield Colliery South Yorkshire leads to closure of railway line from Doncaster to Hull and South Humberside.
- 22 March 2013, Fatal landslide in Looe, Cornwall following heavy rains and flooding in the south west. landslide in Norton, the Mumbles, near Swansea, presenting no danger.
- 29 April 2013, A large landslide on the south Dorset coast at St Oswald's Bay between Lulworth Cove and Durdle Door estimated to be the largest landslide in Dorset since a slide at Mupe Bay in April 2000, closed and diverted sections of the South West Coast Path.

The School of Civil Engineering and Geosciences at Newcastle University is conducting a study to gather as much information about the flash-flooding that hit Newcastle and the North East during summer 2012, launching the ToonFlood Project for the submission of photos and comments to help calibrate computer modelling of the event.
