= Holy Trinity Church, Salway Ash =

Church in Salway Ash, Dorset, England

Holy Trinity Church
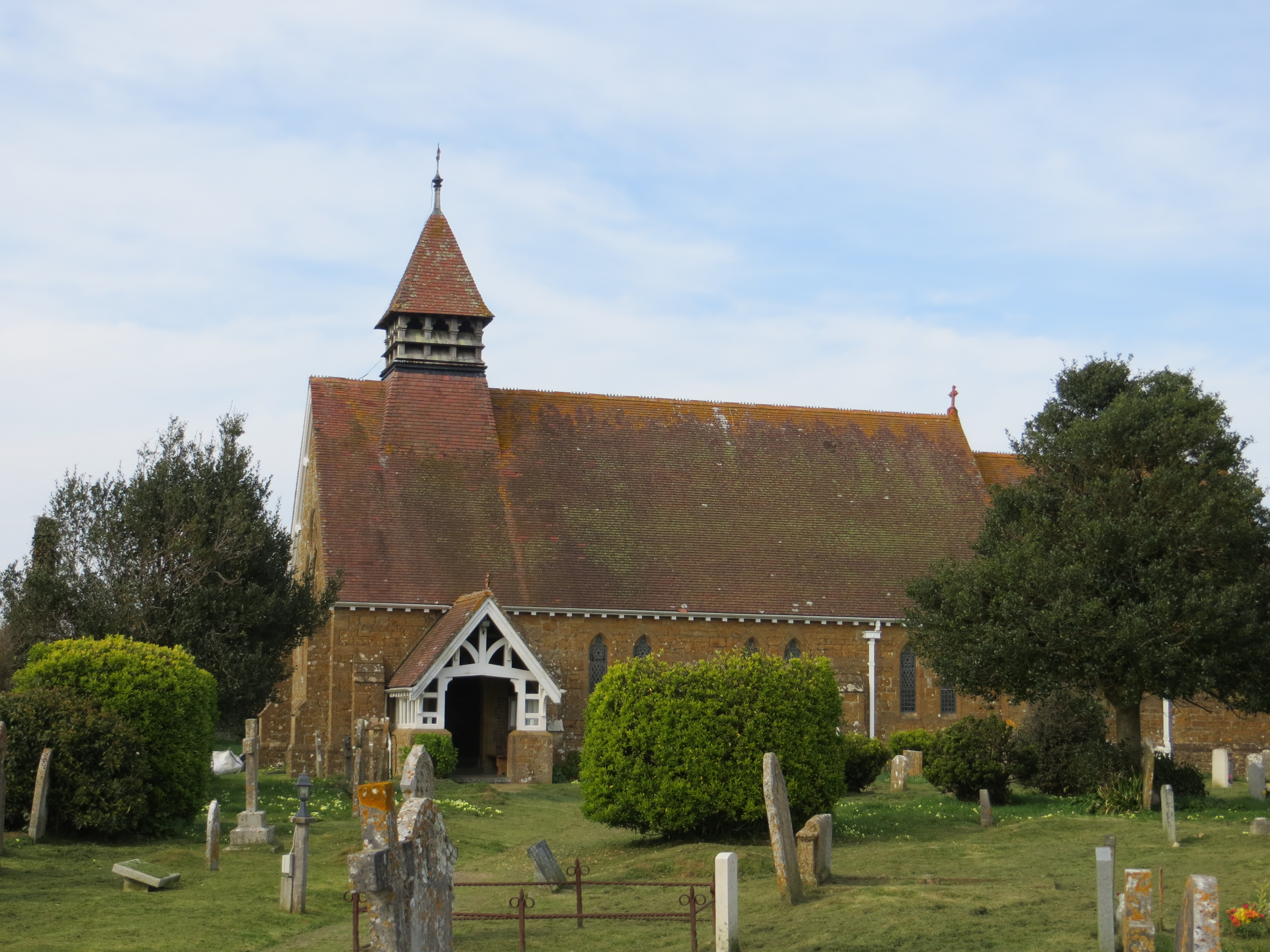

Religion
- Affiliation: Church of England
- Ecclesiastical or organizational status: Active
- Year consecrated: 1890

Location
- Location: Salway Ash, Dorset, England
- Interactive map of Holy Trinity Church
- Coordinates: 50.7747°N 2.7727°W

Architecture
- Architect: George Crickmay
- Type: Church
- Style: Early English

Holy Trinity Church is a Church of England church in Salway Ash, Dorset, England. The church was designed by George Crickmay and built in 1887–89. It now forms part of the Beaminster Area Team Ministry.

== History ==
Holy Trinity was built as a chapel of ease to the parish church of St Mary in Netherbury to serve the 500 inhabitants of both Salway Ash and Bowood. It replaced an earlier chapel of ease which was established through the efforts of the vicar of Netherbury and Beaminster, Rev. William Bookland, and opened on 24 October 1833. In 1879, it was converted into a schoolroom, which led the then-rector of Netherbury, Rev. W. Gildea, to begin efforts towards erecting a new church in the village. The 1833 church continues to form part of Salway Ash Primary School today.

Plans for the new church were drawn up by George Crickmay of the Weymouth and Westminster architects Messrs. Crickmay and Sons, with accommodation for 220 people. A plot of land opposite the 1833 church was purchased from the Barnicott family for £100. Much of the estimated £2,000 cost to build the church was raised by subscription. Substantial contributions were received by Lady Oglander of Parnham Park and Lord Eldon, who both donated £100, while the Bishop of Salisbury, Mr. R. Williams and Rev. Gildea donated £50 each. The Salisbury Diocesan Church Building Association granted £80 in April 1887.

The foundation stone was laid by Mrs. Reeves on 4 August 1887, with Rev. Gildea officiating the ceremony. By this time, £1,200 had been raised towards the building fund. For the church's construction, Rev. Gildea acted as clerk of the works. No general contractor was hired; instead the Committee engaged local workmen directly where required. Major Groves provided £25 worth of hauling as part of the work and a number of farmers of the parish provided approximately £5 worth each. Rev. Gildea made a number of the church's fittings himself.

The completed church was consecrated by the Bishop of Salisbury, the Right Rev. John Wordsworth, on 16 January 1890. £50 of debt was left to clear at the time of the consecration.

In 1895, stained glass was installed in the three-light east window in memory of Rev. William James Catton, the assistant priest of the parish, who died suddenly in 1892. The glass was gifted by Charlotte Catton (Rev. Catton's mother) and Angie Gildea. The dedication service was conducted by Rev. Gildea with assistance from the Archdeacon of Dorset, Rev. Francis Sowter, and the curate, Rev. R. Pearce, in July 1895. A new organ was installed at the church in 1904 and dedicated by Rev. Gildea on 12 May 1904. It was built by the Sweetland Organ Company of Bath and cost approximately £130. The church underwent repair and redecoration work in c. 1971.

== Architecture ==
Holy Trinity is built of Waddon Hill stone with Hamstone dressings and roofs covered with Broseley tiles. The internal walls are lined with a mixture of white Poole, red Fareham and brown Broadmayne brickwork. The church is made up of a nave, chancel, south porch and north vestry with organ chamber. There is a bell turret containing a single bell on the west end of the roof. The north and south sides of the nave have coupled lancet windows. There is a four-light lancet window at the church's west end and a three-light lancet window at the east end. Inside the church, the passages are laid with sanded pennant paving, and the chancel and sacrarium with encaustic tiles. Under the seating, the floor is laid with solid blocks of wood. The sacrarium is raised above the nave by five steps made from blue pennant stone. The roofwork is made from pitch pine. The iron work of the doors was made by Messrs. Newman of Beaminster.

Rev. Gildea made a number of fittings himself, including the oak pulpit, altar table, altar rails, reredos, lectern and oak choir stalls. Mrs. Gundry of Slape Manor carved the central panel on the pulpit, and the carving work of the prayer desk and reredos was carried out by Miss Grimston of Hatchlands. The reredos' panels were painted by Miss Hester Gildea. The benches in the nave are of pitch pine. A number of gifts were received for the church during its construction, including a brass pulpit and desk by Mr. H. Symes. A brass chandelier was gifted by the Bishop and Canon Codd in addition to their subscriptions towards the building fund. Rev. E. Butcher gifted the foot rest of polished Bothenhampton stone, Mr. and Mrs. Gundry gifted the encaustic tiling for the sacrarium and chancel, and Mr. and Miss Edwards gifted the font ewer. The stained glass of the central east window features a representation of Jesus on the Cross with Mary Magdalene below. The right window depicts the Three Marys and the left window depicts Saint John.
