= Balson =

Balson is a surname. Notable people with the surname include:

- Allison Balson (born 1969), American actress, singer, and songwriter
- Mike Balson (1947–2019), English footballer
- Ralph Balson (1890–1964), English-born Australian artist
