= Michael Lane (engineer) =

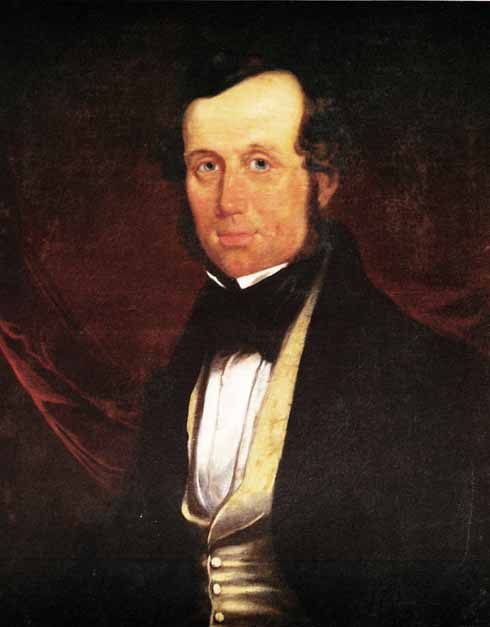
Michael Lane, picture by unknown artist, mid-19th century

Michael Lane (26 October 1802 – 27 February 1868) was a British civil engineer who served as the Chief Engineer of the Great Western Railway (GWR). A protégé of Isambard Kingdom Brunel, he worked with both Brunel and Brunel's father Marc on various projects before joining the younger Brunel on the GWR. He eventually succeeded that Brunel as the railway's Chief Engineer, serving in the position for nearly eight years before his death.

== Biography ==
Born in Shadwell, London, Lane began his career in 1825 working on the construction of the Thames Tunnel in nearby Wapping, under Sir Marc Brunel and his son Isambard. The project nearly cost him his life when the tunnel was breached and suddenly flooded in May 1827. According to an account published by Isambard's son, Lane rose from the post of foreman bricklayer to become one of Isambard's most trusted assistants, due to the qualities of leadership and craftsmanship which he displayed in his work.

Lane's experience in tunnel construction led to him being commissioned to build the Beaminster Tunnel in Dorset between 1830 and 1832. Isambard Kingdom Brunel brought Lane with him to the Bristol Docks to serve as Resident Engineer from 1832 to 1834. He subsequently accompanied Brunel to the Monkwearmouth Docks in Sunderland and worked there until December 1840. He appears to have undertaken his first marriage, to Maria McSweeney, some time in the mid-1830s; although they had one daughter in 1836, Maria died within only a few years. Pressure of work on the Great Western Railway forced Brunel to quit the Monkwearmouth Docks in September 1838 and he called Lane south to work with him on the GWR at Bath "in the full expectation of his prosecuting it with vigour and devoting himself entirely to it." Lane met and married his second wife Jane Harris, a native of Bath, while working there. They had ten children.

Lane did not stay in Bath for long. In April 1839 the Monkwearmouth directors asked for him to be returned to his post in the north. Brunel reluctantly agreed, but urged the directors to take good care of Lane: "I hope that any expectations of future advancement he may have formed will be as fully realised as I feel sure yours will be by his usefulness." Lane returned to the GWR in January 1841 to work as an assistant to the Resident Engineer of the railway's western division. He moved to the Hull Docks in 1842 where he worked as Resident Engineer before rejoining the GWR in August 1845, holding various posts with the company over the subsequent fourteen years.

Following the retirement of Brunel's successor T.H. Bertram, Lane became the Chief Engineer of the GWR late in 1860 and retained the post until his death in 1868. His final years were troubled by Bright's disease, a 19th-century term for what is now understood as acute or chronic nephritis, a kidney disease. He was buried in Kensal Green Cemetery in London.

Professional and academic associations
Preceded by T.H. Bertram	Chief Engineer of the Great Western Railway; 1860–1868	Succeeded by William George Owen
