= Mike Balson =

English footballer (1947–2019)

Personal information
- Full name: Michael John Charles Balson
- Date of birth: 9 September 1947
- Place of birth: Bridport, England
- Date of death: 30 May 2019 (aged 71)
- Place of death: United States
- Position: Defender

Youth career
- Colfox School

Senior career*
Years	Team	Apps	(Gls)
1966–1974	Exeter City	276	(9)
1974–1979	Highlands Park		
1979	Atlanta Chiefs	15	(0)
1979–1980	Atlanta Chiefs (indoor)	12	(3)
1982	Georgia Generals		(5)
1986–1987	Tampa Bay Rowdies (indoor)		
- * Club domestic league appearances and goals

Michael John Charles Balson (9 September 1947 – 30 May 2019) was an English professional association football defender who played professionally in England, South Africa and the United States. His career brought him to the United States where he served several decades as a referee as well as a team and league executive. He was a member of both the National Intercollegiate Soccer Officials Association Hall of Fame and the United Soccer Leagues Hall of Fame.

== Player ==
A member of England's oldest family of commercial butchers, As a youth he served as the captain of Colfox School squad. He also had a stint at Bridport FC Balson grew up in England where he began playing for Exeter City in 1966. In 1974, he transferred to South African club, Highlands Park. In 1979, he moved to the United States where he signed with the Atlanta Chiefs of the North American Soccer League. In 1982, he played for the Georgia Generals of the American Soccer League. He played for the Tampa Bay Rowdies during the 1986–87 American Indoor Soccer Association season.

== Referee ==
In 1981, Balson became a member of the National Intercollegiate Soccer Officials Association (NISOA). Over the years, he worked his way into the highest levels of intercollegiate refereeing. In 1984, he became a national referee, working both national junior college and NAIA women's finals. In 1985, he officiated during the NCAA Division I women's tournament. In 1996, he officiated the women's quarterfinals and in 1999, he officiated the NCAA Women's Soccer Championship Final. On the men's side, he oversaw the NCAA quarterfinals from 2000 to 2003 while officiating the ACC men's finals. In 2002, 2004 and 2005, he officiated the NCAA Men's Division I Soccer Championship. He was inducted into the NISOA Hall of Fame in 2006.

== Administrator ==
In 1990, he was part of the establishment of the Atlanta Express of the Sunbelt Independent Soccer League which later became the USISL and eventually the USL. He became a USISL administrator in 1991, the same year he joined the management of the Atlanta Magic. In 1998, he became the general manager of the Atlanta Silverbacks. In 2002, Balson was inducted into the USL Hall of Fame as a Builder.

== Personal life and death ==
Mike was the oldest child of Donald and Joan Balson. He and his wife, Julia, had two children, Melanie and Oliver, and five grandchildren. He and his wife spent over 30 years ministering to prisoners in Atlanta, and also spent 20 years ministering to youth at Georgia Regional Hospital. After a 10-year battle, Balson died on 30 May 2019 from complications associated with Lewy Body Dementia.
