= Holy Trinity Church, Beaminster =

Church in Dorset, England

Holy Trinity Church
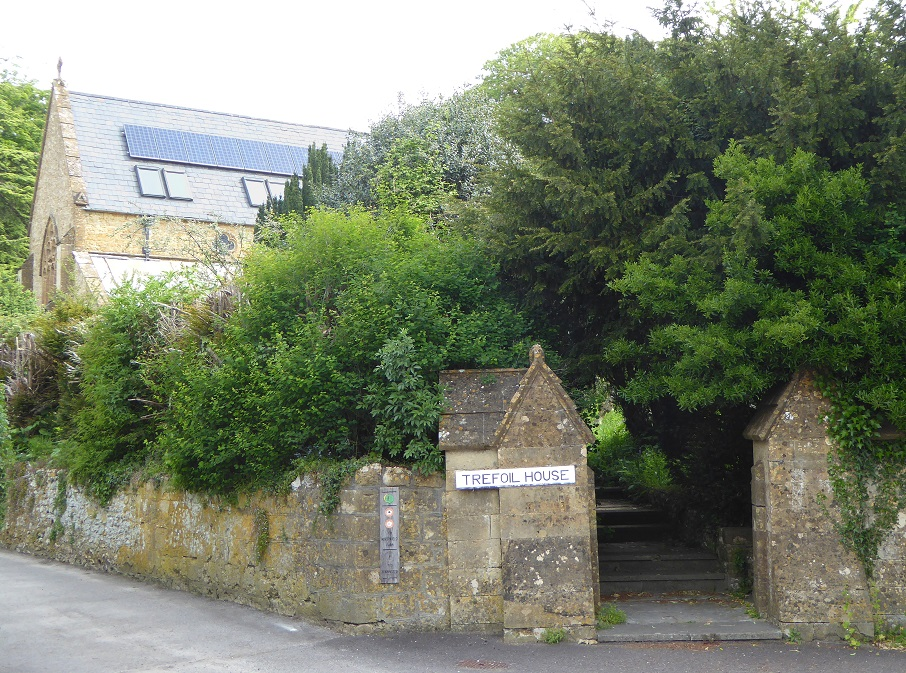

Religion
- Affiliation: Church of England
- Ecclesiastical or organisational status: Redundant
- Year consecrated: 1851

Location
- Location: Beaminster, Dorset, England
- Interactive map of Holy Trinity Church
- Coordinates: 50.8127°N 2.7373°W

Architecture
- Architects: Carver and Giles of Taunton
- Type: Church

Holy Trinity Church is a former Church of England church in Beaminster, Dorset, England. The church was built in 1849–51 and made redundant in 1978. It is now a private residence known as Trefoil House.

== History ==
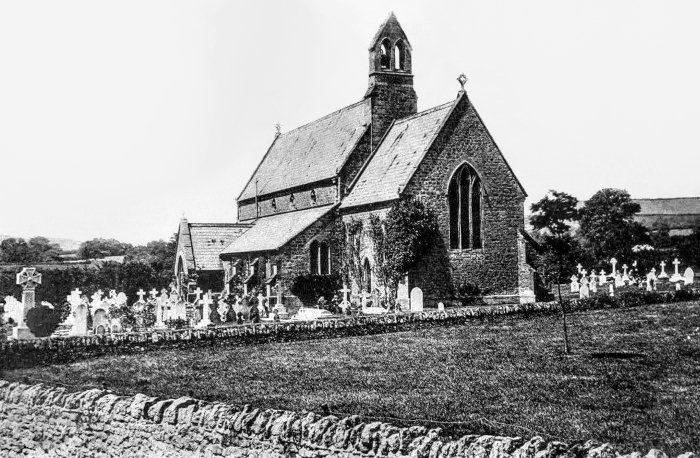
Holy Trinity Church in c. 1898.

Holy Trinity was built as a chapel of ease to the parish church of St Mary's. Although the parish church had the capacity to accommodate 900 persons, the erection of galleries only 4–5 feet above the pews resulted in many "seats for use of the poor" being in a position where occupants were unable to see or hear the minister. An extension of St Mary's by building a new aisle was originally considered, however surveyors believed the church was already overcrowded with its galleries and that an additional aisle would make the building too wide, resulting in its proportions being "materially injured".

In 1848, it was decided to construct a chapel of ease on a site north-east of the town centre, allowing it to serve both the town and its newly established suburbs and hamlets to the north and north-east. The new church was designed by Carver and Giles of Taunton and its construction funded by public subscription, alongside grants from the Diocesan Church Building and Church Building Societies. The foundation stone was laid on 4 October 1849 by Samuel Cox, who had donated the half-acre site for the church and made a subscription of £150 towards its construction. The church was constructed by John Chick of Beaminster, with assistance from William and Robert Chambers, also of Beaminster. Holy Trinity was consecrated by the Bishop of Salisbury, Rev. Edward Denison, on 17 June 1851.

The church was temporarily licensed to solemnise marriages in 1861–62 while St Mary's underwent restoration. Holy Trinity underwent alteration in 1894 when another entrance was added on the north side, the west part of the nave re-seated and the font moved to a new location. The burial ground was also enlarged and the site consecrated by the Bishop of Salisbury, Rev. John Wordsworth, on 27 August 1894. The Royal Navy officer Robert O'Brien FitzRoy was buried at the church in 1896 and a large cross of Cornish granite erected there in his memory.

=== Redundancy and conversion into Trefoil House ===
Holy Trinity was declared redundant by the Church of England on 1 May 1978. The Redundant Churches Uses Committee of the Diocese of Salisbury then commissioned Messrs Drew & Salisbury of Beaminster to draw up plans for the church's conversion into five dwellings, for which planning permission was obtained in 1979. In 1980, Peter Williams Associates of London submitted a new scheme to convert the church into a single dwelling and this was approved in 1981. The work was subsequently carried out and the church received the new name Trefoil House. In 1988, the same architects submitted a scheme to convert the building into three dwellings, but this was refused on the grounds of overdevelopment. In 2019, plans were submitted to convert the house into two dwellings and this received planning permission in 2021.

== Architecture ==
Holy Trinity was built using local stone and flint, with Ham stone dressings, quoins and buttresses, in an Early English style. Able to accommodate 400 persons, it was made up of a nave, a chancel with small vestry, two side aisles, and a north and south porch. The circular pulpit was built of English oak on a base of Ham stone, while the octagonal font and its base was also carved from Ham stone. The reredos were carved in Caen stone, with marble pillars and a Ham stone ledge, and the pews of pitch pine. Since becoming redundant, the church's bellcote has been removed but originally contained a single bell.
