= Beaminster Tunnel =

Road tunnel in Dorset, UK

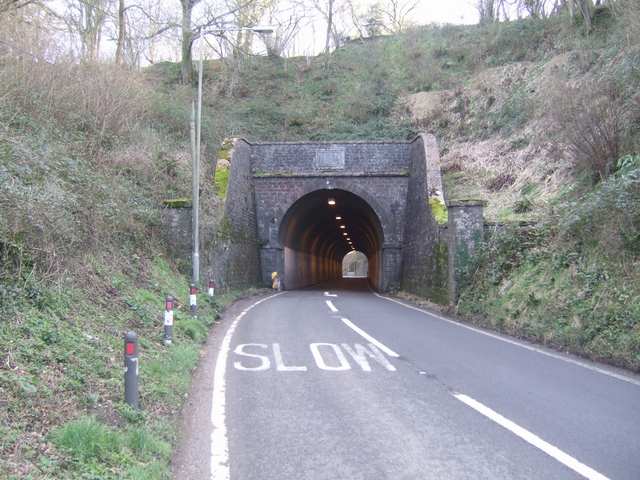
- The north portal of Beaminster Tunnel, before the collapse of 7 July 2012
- Interactive map of Beaminster Tunnel

Overview
- Location: Dorset, England
- Coordinates: 50.826°N 2.757°W
- Route: A3066, Beaminster to Mosterton road

Operation
- Work began: 1830
- Constructed: Brick, lined with gunite
- Opened: 29 June 1832

Technical
- Length: 345-foot (105 m)

Beaminster Tunnel or Horn Hill Tunnel is a 345-foot-long (105 m) road tunnel on the A3066 road between Beaminster and Mosterton in Dorset, England. The tunnel was constructed between 1830 and 1832; it was one of the first road tunnels built in Britain, and is the only pre-railway road tunnel in the country still in use. It was built to take a toll road underneath a steep hill to the north of Beaminster and make it easier for horse-drawn traffic to travel from the coast to the hinterland of Dorset. It underwent significant repairs in 1968 and again in 2009, but in 2012 a torrential rainstorm caused a landslide that resulted in the partial collapse of the tunnel's north entrance and the deaths of two people.

== Construction ==
The tunnel is constructed from brick with walls 3 ft 6 in (1.07 m) thick, faced with Hamstone. It runs for 345 feet (105 m) under Horn Hill, a 650-foot-high (200 m) promontory to the north of Beaminster. The hill presented a major barrier to travellers passing from the newly enlarged harbour at West Bay on the Dorset coast to the hinterland; according to a contemporary writer, the hill was "a great impediment to the communication between the lower portion of Dorsetshire and a considerable district of Somerset, particularly with regard to Bridport harbour." The main road passed over the hill, climbing almost 500 feet in a mile-and-a-half (150 metres in two kilometres). The steep gradient of 1-in-6 (17%) made passage difficult for horse-drawn transport. In the late 1820s, a Beaminster solicitor named Giles Russell proposed that the owners of the toll road over the hill, the Bridport 2nd District Turnpike Trust, should seek to build a tunnel under it to shorten and flatten the road. Russell played a key role in getting the project underway and managed to raise the £13,000 required through loans and contributions from many of Beaminster's artisans and traders.

In March 1830 Parliament passed the Bridport Turnpike Trust (Second District) Act, 1830 authorising construction of the tunnel, which began the following month. The engineer Michael Lane, a colleague of Marc Brunel who had worked on the pioneering Thames Tunnel in London, was in charge of the project, which took just over two years to complete. Only one fatality was sustained, a worker named William Aplin who died only three days before the tunnel opened when he was struck by a landslide outside one of the tunnel entrances. He was memorialised with a stone marked with a white cross which can still be seen in situ. The tunnel reduced the road's gradient from 1-in-6 (17%) to 1-in-10 (10%) and shortened it by a mile (1.6 km), as well as lowering its maximum elevation by 50 feet (15 m). At the time of its opening, only a handful of road tunnels had been built in Britain; it pre-dates the construction of the first railway tunnels, and it is now the only pre-railway road tunnel in the country still in use.

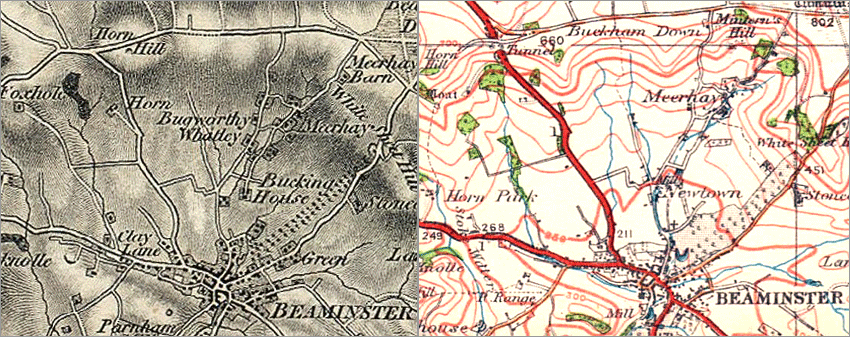
The area around Beaminster Tunnel before and after its construction (left: 1811, right: 1932). Note the changes in the alignment of the road running from the centre of the maps to the top left.

=== Opening ===
The tunnel was formally opened on 29 June 1832 with enthusiastic celebrations including a 21-gun salute fired from the top of the hill, a firework display and the launching of a hot air balloon. A procession of dignitaries, local people and the tunnel workers paraded through the tunnel accompanied by three flag-bearers, two bands, the project's patron in a four-horse open carriage and the Commissioners of the Trust and various officials in a mail wagon. A celebratory dinner was held afterwards in the White Hart inn in Beaminster, where Giles Russell was the guest of honour. A song was especially written for the occasion, including the lyrics:

The yielding soil, through able hands,
A tunnel wide displays;
And Lane’s efficient aid demands
Our warm, admiring praise
In swelling streams may cheering wealth
To Beaminster descend:
And ever joy-inspiring health
Her social sons attend.

Commemorations of the opening of the tunnel became an annual tradition in Beaminster with "Tunnel Fairs" being held every Good Friday on Horn Hill until about the 1880s. In 1881, the tunnel became free to use when the tollgates were removed and the toll house at the north end was converted into a dwelling for the tunnel's lamplighter. The house was later demolished to allow the road to be widened. The two entrance portals are Grade II listed as being of Special Architectural or Historic Interest.

== Renovation and repairs ==
By the 1960s, 130 years of exposure to the elements had resulted in the tunnel's brick walls crumbling from the effects of frost. To prevent falls of frost-damaged bricks, a cement mix known as gunite was sprayed onto the walls to stabilise them. However, this in turn became detached from the brickwork, and in October–November 2009 the tunnel was closed to carry out repairs. The gunite layer was re-fixed to the brickwork using bolts and painted, and the drainage systems and portal arches were also renovated. The tunnel's lighting system was replaced at the same time, and the carriageway was also resurfaced.

== July 2012 partial collapse ==
At around 22:10 on 7 July 2012, Rosemary Snell and Michael Rolfe, from Somerset, were driving through the tunnel and were caught in a partial collapse of the north entrance, caused by torrential rain. Several hundred tons of mud, earth, stones and vegetation fell onto the road and crushed their car, killing them. The flattened vehicle was entirely buried and was not found until 10 days later after the two were reported missing, prompting police to carry out a search of the debris. Their deaths were later ruled by a coroner to have been accidental.

The local Dorset Police force was criticised for failing to find the bodies sooner and the case was voluntarily referred to the Independent Police Complaints Commission (IPCC) to be reviewed, but the IPCC subsequently declined to open an investigation.

Although there were claims that tree-felling by Dorset County Council workers could have destabilised the slope above the tunnel portal, expert opinion suggested that the landslide had been triggered by a poorly maintained drainage ditch above the tunnel breaching during the rainstorm, causing a sudden flood of water into an already saturated area.

In the aftermath of the collapse, five options were put forward to remedy the tunnel, including stabilising the slope, permanently extending the tunnel, removing some of the soil from the hillside above the tunnel, removing the tunnel and building a cutting or bypassing the tunnel. A public consultation held in October 2012 found public support for the option of building a concrete hood at the entrance to the tunnel. It was estimated that this would cost about £1.75 million and would take about six months to complete. The Department of Transport refused at the time to provide extra funding to meet the cost.

The tunnel reopened on 29 July 2013 following £2 million of work. By February 2014, it was reported that Dorset County Council had spent around £2.5 million on remedial works around the tunnel.
