= Beaminster School =

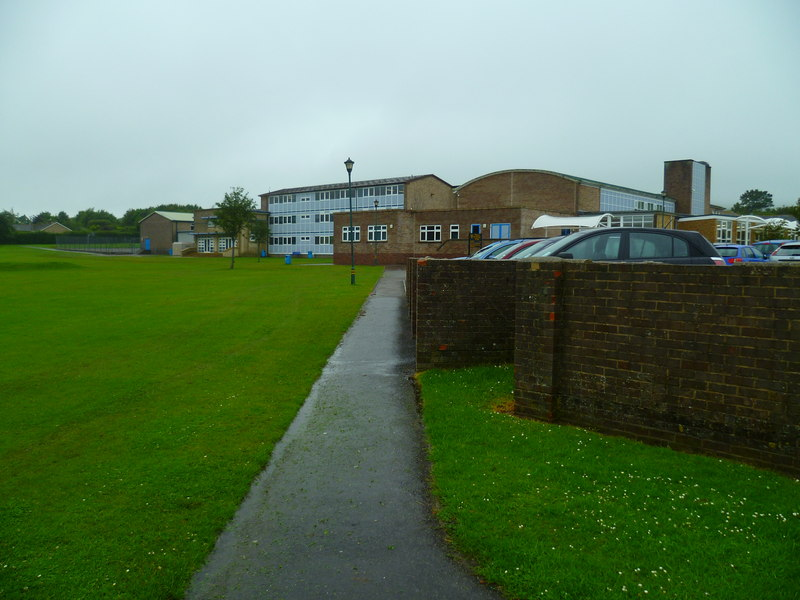
- Beaminster School

Location
- Newtown; Beaminster, Dorset, DT8 3EP; England
- 50.81457°N 2.740905°W

Information
- Type: Voluntary controlled school
- Motto: Latin: Duce et auspice deo
- Religious affiliation: Christian
- Local authority: Dorset
- Department for Education URN: 113884 Tables
- Ofsted: Reports
- Headteacher: Keith Hales
- Gender: Coeducational
- Age: 11 to 18
- Houses: Eggardon, Lewesdon, Mapperton, Pilsdon and Waddon
- Website: http://www.beaminster.dorset.sch.uk/

Beaminster School is a co-educational secondary school and sixth form located in Beaminster in the English county of Dorset.

It is a voluntary controlled Christian school administered by the Church of England Diocese of Salisbury and Dorset County Council. The school also has a specialism in technology, and was called Beaminster Technology College for a while.

Beaminster School offers GCSEs, BTECs and NVQs courses as programmes of study for pupils, with some courses offered in conjunction with Kingston Maurward College. Beaminster Schools sixth form provision is offered in conjunction with the Sir John Colfox Academy in Bridport, and students in the sixth form have the option to study from a range of A Levels and further BTECs. Beaminster School received a 'Good' grade in its latest Ofsted report of November 2013.

Vaughan Gething, former First Minister of Wales, attended the school, as did musician PJ Harvey.
