= Beaminster =

Town in Dorset, England

Coordinates: 50.809°N 2.7391°W

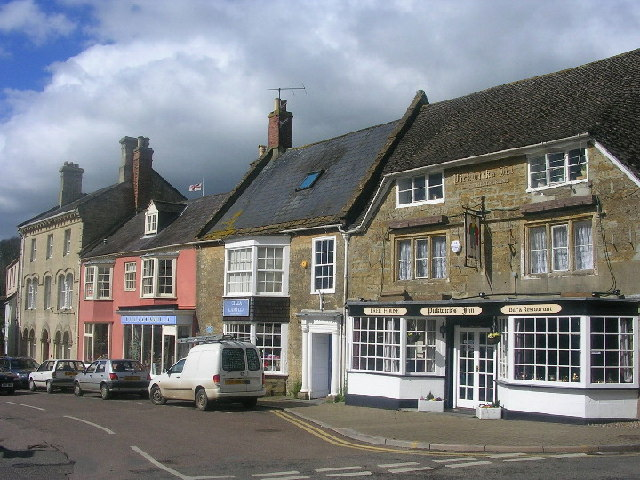
- Beaminster town centre

- Location within Dorset
- Population: 3,177 2021 census
- OS grid reference: ST4701
  - London: 145 miles (233 km)
- Civil parish: Beaminster
- Unitary authority: Dorset
- Ceremonial county: Dorset
- Region: South West
- Country: England
- Sovereign state: United Kingdom
- Post town: Beaminster
- Postcode district: DT8
- Dialling code: 01308
- Police: Dorset
- Fire: Dorset and Wiltshire
- Ambulance: South Western
- UK Parliament: West Dorset
- Website: Beaminster Town Council

Beaminster (/ˈbɛmɪnstər/ BEM-in-stər) is a town and civil parish in Dorset, England, approximately 15 miles (24 km) northwest of the county town Dorchester. It is sited in a bowl-shaped valley near the source of the small River Brit. The population of Beaminster parish was recorded as 3,177 in the 2021 census.

Beaminster is the product of the Anglo-Saxon age, dating back to around the 7th century, when it was known as Bebingmynster, meaning the church of Bebbe although the date of origin of the town is unknown. The place name and historic evidence indicates that it was probably the site of a primary Saxon minster church and was at the centre of a large episcopal estate. These are likely to have acted as a focus for a settlement, but evidence of its formation is lacking.

In its history Beaminster has been a centre of manufacture of linen and woollens, the raw materials for which were produced in the surrounding countryside. The town experienced three serious fires in the 17th and 18th centuries; the first of these, during the English Civil War, almost destroyed the fabric of the town.

Beaminster's parish church – the Church of St Mary – is notable for its architecture, particularly its tower, and is grade I listed.

== History ==
In the Domesday Book of 1086 the manor of Beaminster was recorded as being owned by the See of Salisbury. Bishop Osmund gave it as a supplement to two of the Cathedral prebends in 1091. The parish formed part of Beaminster Forum and Redhone hundred.

In the English Civil War the town declared for Parliament and was sacked by Royalist forces in 1644. Prince Maurice stayed in the town on Palm Sunday, though his stay was brief because a fire, caused by a musket being discharged into a thatched roof, almost totally destroyed the town. The town suffered further accidental fires in 1684 and 1781.

By 1841 the population was 2,938.

Previously Beaminster was a centre for the production of linen and woollens. Flax was grown and sheep kept on the surrounding hills and the town was locally more important than it is today: factories were constructed in the 18th and early 19th centuries, and as many as seventeen inns existed in the town in the early 20th century.

No railway line came through Beaminster and as a result the town declined relative to other local towns such as Bridport and Dorchester.

Horn Park, about 1 1/2 miles (2.5 kilometres) northwest of Beaminster, is a neo-Georgian country house of five bays and two storeys, designed by architect T. Lawrence Dale and completed in 1911. Inside the house the central corridor is barrel vaulted and leads to a drawing room whose groin vault is reminiscent of the work of Sir John Soane (1753–1837). The drawing room includes Jacobean features re-used from the largely mid-16th-century nearby Parnham House, which was being altered and restored at about the time that Horn Park was being built. Horn Park is grade II listed. Its gardens are occasionally open to the public as part of the National Gardens Scheme.

== Geography ==
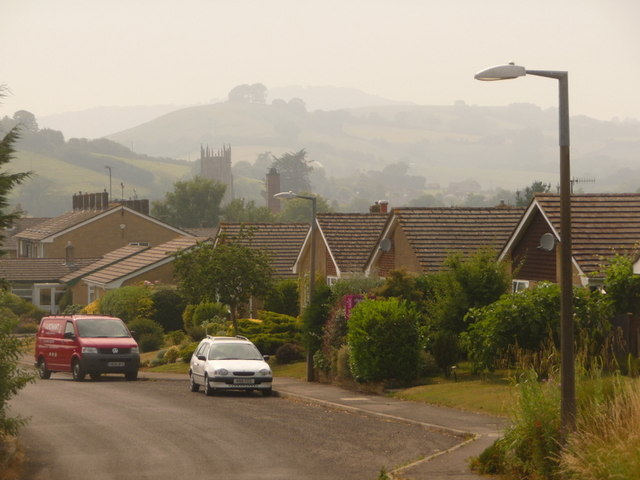
View showing hills to the west of the town

Beaminster is sited 50 to 80 metres (160–260 ft) above sea level in a bowl-shaped valley, surrounded by hills which rise to 244 metres (801 ft) at Beaminster Down to the northeast. The River Brit and many small streams emerge from springs on the slopes above the town. The confluences of several of these streams are within the town's boundaries. Beaminster's growth has historically been along the course of these streams, resulting in a settlement pattern that is roughly star-shaped.

Beaminster is situated approximately 45 miles (72 km) south of Bristol, 38 miles (61 km) west of Bournemouth, 35 miles (56 km) east of Exeter and 15 miles (24 km) northwest of the county town Dorchester.

=== Geology ===
Beaminster is sited mostly on Middle Jurassic fuller's earth clay, with some Inferior Oolite in the south of the town and Bridport Sand Formation north of the town centre. The hills north and east of the town are Cretaceous chalk with a scarp face of Upper Greensand Formation, while those to the south and west are of Bridport Sand Formation. There are several faults running west-northwest to east-southeast through the town and its southern environs. Horn Park Quarry SSSI produced building stone from the Inferior Oolite and some quality fossil specimens before becoming a light industrial estate on the road to Broadwindsor. Apart from the ammonites, the site displays a remarkable flat erosion surface and the most complete succession in the Upper Aalenian ironshot oolite limestone of the area.

== Demography ==
=== Beaminster parish ===
Dorset County Council's 2013 mid-year estimate of the population of Beaminster parish is 3,100.

The historic population of Beaminster parish from the censuses between 1921 and 2001 is shown in the table below.

Census population of Beaminster Parish 1921-2001
Census	1921	1931	1951	1961	1971	1981	1991	2001
Population	1,651	1,612	1,785	2,000	2,350	2,370	2,770	2,920

Source: Dorset County Council

=== 2011 census ===
Published results from the 2011 national census combine information on Beaminster parish with the small neighbouring parish of Mapperton to the southeast. Within this area there were 1,680 dwellings, 1,529 households and a population of 3,136.

== Economy and society ==
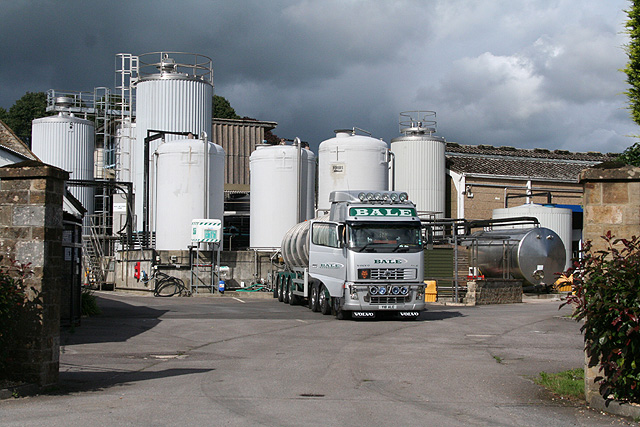
The Nisaplin factory in the town

International Flavors & Fragrances (previously DuPont) produce Nisaplin (E234), a commercial formulation of the natural bacteriocin nisin, at a factory in the town. It was first isolated by Aplin and Barret and produced in the 1950s in the factory laboratory then at 11–15 North Street.

The Clipper Teas company is based in Beaminster. It is currently owned by the Dutch company Royal Wessanen.

Beaminster hosts the Beaminster Festival, an annual music and art festival. Whitcombe Disc golf course at Beaminster has hosted the British Open Disc Golf Championship several times and the European Disc Golf Championship in 2003. The town is twinned with the town of Saint-James on the Brittany/Normandy border in France.

Buckham Fair, a fundraising vintage fair held annually on land near the town, took place for ten years until the last event in 2018. As of 2020, the fair has been indefinitely postponed.

== Transport ==
The nearest railway station is Crewkerne, 5 miles (8 km) north of the town. Exeter International Airport is 30 miles (48 km) to the west. The main road through the town is the A3066, which leads to Bridport to the south and Mosterton and Crewkerne to the north. The road north passes through Horn Hill tunnel, which opened in June 1832 and is the sole pre-railway age road tunnel that is still in daily public use.

== Media ==
Local news and television programmes are provided by BBC South West and ITV West Country. Television signals are received from the Stockland Hill TV transmitter and local relay transmitter.

Beaminster's local radio stations are BBC Radio Solent on 103.8 FM, Heart West on 97.1 FM, Greatest Hits Radio Dorset on 97.2 FM and Abbey104, a community based station that broadcast on 107.4 FM.

The town's is served by the local newspaper, Dorset Echo.

== Governance ==
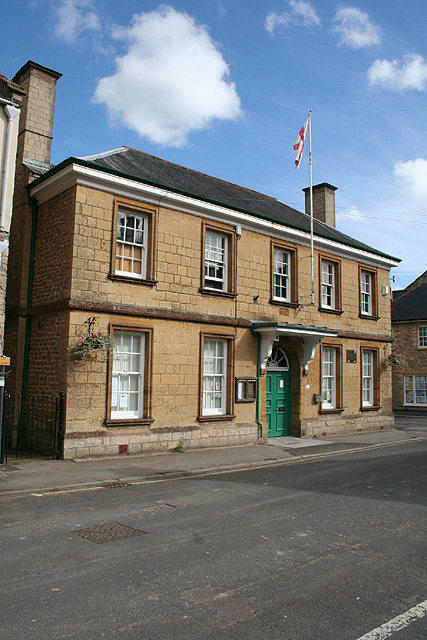
Public Hall, 8 Fleet Street

There are two tiers of local government covering Beaminster, at parish (town) and unitary authority level: Beaminster Town Council and Dorset Council. The town council is based at the Public Hall at 8 Fleet Street.

Beaminster is part of the Beaminster ward for elections to Dorset Council.

Beaminster is part of the West Dorset constituency for elections to the Parliament of the United Kingdom.

Historically, Beaminster was a chapelry within the ancient parish of Netherbury. Beaminster was treated as a separate civil parish from an early date, but remained part of the ecclesiastical parish of Netherbury until 1849. When elected parish and district councils were created in 1894, Beaminster was given a parish council and included in the Beaminster Rural District. The rural district was abolished in 1974 to become part of the larger West Dorset district, which was in turn abolished in 2019 when the unitary Dorset Council was established.

== Education ==
Primary schools in the town include St Mary's Church of England Primary School.

Beaminster School is the town's secondary school. It has a combined sixth form with The Sir John Colfox Academy, in the nearby town of Bridport.

Beaminster is also home to Mountjoy School co-sharing the site of Beaminster School.

Hooke Park is the woodland campus of the Architectural Association School of Architecture.

== Religion ==
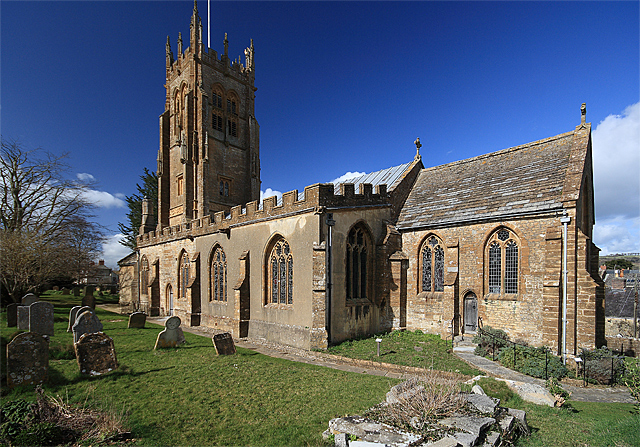
St. Mary's parish church

Beaminster has an Anglican church, dedicated to St Mary of the Annunciation; and a Catholic church, St John's. St Mary's is notable for its architecture, which is considered among the best in the county. The tower in particular has been described as "a handsome example of its period" and "the glory of Beaminster".

St Mary's construction mostly dates from the 15th and 16th centuries, but was restored twice in the 19th. The eastern part of the north aisle incorporates part of an earlier 13th-century building, and the font bowl is late 12th century. The pulpit is Jacobean. A chapel of ease, Holy Trinity Church, was built in 1849-51. After becoming redundant in 1978, it was converted into a private residence, Trefoil House.

== In literature ==
Beaminster is referenced as "Emminster" in the fictional Wessex of Thomas Hardy's Tess of the d'Urbervilles.

Dorset's 19th-century dialect poet William Barnes wrote of Beaminster:

Sweet Be'mi'ster, that bist a-bound
By green and woody hills all round,
Wi' hedges, reachèn up between
A thousand vields o' zummer green.

It is a location for part of the story for the post-apocalyptic novel The Day of the Triffids by John Wyndham.

== Notable people ==
- Beaminster was the boyhood home of the Arctic explorer, naturalist and author Samuel Hearne. Hearne is considered by some to have been the inspiration for the tragic figure in Samuel Taylor Coleridge's The Rime of the Ancient Mariner.
- Beaminster is the adopted home town of actor Martin Clunes.
- Mat Follas had his first restaurant The Wild Garlic in the town square, though in 2013 it was moved to larger premises elsewhere.
- Beaminster was also home of Lynne Reid Banks, author of The L-Shaped Room and The Indian in the Cupboard; both books were filmed.
- Furniture maker John Makepeace lives in the town after selling nearby Parnham House
- Soldier and politician John Holden (1810-1860) was born in the town.
- Henry was born in the town in 1981 before moving to Chard, Somerset in 1990.

Parnham was the home of William Barnard Rhodes-Moorhouse, the first airman to receive the Victoria Cross.

== Twin towns ==
Beaminster is twinned with:

- Saint-James, Normandy, France

== Bibliography ==
- Newman, John; Pevsner, Nikolaus (1972). Dorset. The Buildings of England. Harmondsworth: Penguin Books. pp. 84–89. ISBN 0-14-071044-2.
