= The Sir John Colfox Academy =

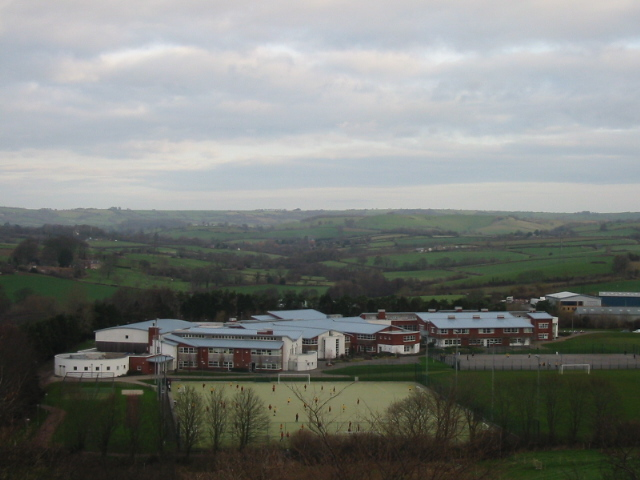
- The school in 2005

Location
- Ridgeway; Bridport, Dorset, DT6 3DT; England
- Coordinates: 50.74676°N 2.74808°W

Information
- Type: Academy
- Local authority: Dorset
- Department for Education URN: 141735 Tables
- Ofsted: Reports
- Headteacher: A Shelley
- Gender: Coeducational
- Age: 11 to 18
- Houses: Adler, Fleur de lys, Hinomaru, Toro
- Website: www.colfox.org

The Sir John Colfox Academy (formerly the Sir John Colfox School, and until 1999 Colfox School) is a coeducational secondary school and sixth form located in Bridport in the English county of Dorset.

Previously a community school administered by Dorset County Council, the Sir John Colfox School converted to academy status in May 2015 and was renamed the Sir John Colfox Academy. However, the school continues to coordinate with Dorset County Council for admissions. Admissions to the school includes pupils that usually attend Bridport Primary School, St Mary's CE Primary School, Burton Bradstock CE VC School, Loders CE VC Primary School, Powerstock CE VA Primary School, St Catherine's Catholic Primary School, Symondsbury CE Primary School and Thorner's CE School.

The Sir John Colfox School offers GCSEs and BTECs as programmes of study for pupils. The Sir John Colfox School sixth form provision is offered in conjunction with Beaminster School in Beaminster, and students in the sixth form have the option to study from a range of A Levels and further BTECs.
