= Thomas Daniel =

Thomas Daniel may refer to:

- Thomas Daniel (MP), Member of Parliament (MP) for Huntingdon, 1386–1390
- Thomas Daniel (merchant) (1762–1854), Bristol merchant
- Tommy Daniel (1923-2016), English footballer, see List of Bury F.C. players
- Thomas Franklin Daniel (born 1954), American botanist and teacher
- Thomas Daniel (pentathlete) (born 1985), Austrian modern pentathlete
- Thomas Daniel (biologist), American biologist
- Thomas Daniel (actor), actor in The Blue Seal
- Tom Daniel (designer), creator of scale model kits for Monogram Models

== See also ==
- Thomas Daniell (1749–1840), painter
