= Tom Hall (disambiguation) =

Tom Hall (born 1964) is an American game designer.

Tom Hall may also refer to:

== Sports ==
- Tom Hall (American football) (1940–2017), Detroit Lions, Minnesota Vikings and New Orleans Saints footballer
- Tom Hall (archer) (born 1990), British archer
- Tom Hall (Australian footballer) (1921–2008), Australian rules footballer
- Tom Hall (baseball) (born 1947), Minnesota Twins, Cincinnati Reds, New York Mets, and Kansas City Royals baseball pitcher
- Tom Hall (cricketer, born 1930) (1930–1984), Derbyshire, Somerset and MCC cricketer

== Others ==
- Tom Hall (electronic musician) (born 1980), Australian musician and multimedia artist
- Tom T. Hall (1936–2021), American country singer-songwriter

== See also ==
- Tommy Hall (disambiguation)
- Thomas Hall (disambiguation)
