= Thomas Slade (disambiguation) =

Thomas Slade (1703/4–1771) was a naval architect.

Thomas or Tom Slade may also refer to:

- Thomas Moore Slade, English art dealer and collector
- Thomas Slade (MP) for Huntingdon (UK Parliament constituency) in 1572
- Tom Slade (1952–2006), American football player
- Tom Slade Jr. (1936–2014), American politician
