= Thomas Coote =

Thomas Coote may refer to:

- Thomas Coote (English politician), member of the Parliament of the United Kingdom for Huntingdon
- Thomas Coote (Irish politician), member of the Irish House of Commons
