= Samuel Whitbread (Liberal politician) =

British Member of Parliament

Member of Parliament for Luton
- In office 29 September 1892 – 13 July 1895
- Preceded by: Cyril Flower
- Succeeded by: Thomas Ashton

Member of Parliament for Huntingdon
- In office 12 January 1906 – 15 January 1910
- Preceded by: George Montagu
- Succeeded by: John Cator

Personal details
- Born: Samuel Howard Whitbread; 8 January 1858
- Died: 29 July 1944 (aged 86)
- Party: Liberal
- Parent: Samuel Whitbread (father)

Samuel Howard Whitbread CB MP (8 January 1858 – 29 July 1944) was a British Member of Parliament and a member of the Whitbread brewing family.

== Career ==
He was the son of Samuel Whitbread, and was educated at Eton College and Trinity College, Cambridge. He served as the Member of Parliament for the constituencies of Huntingdon and Luton (until 1895).

He was appointed a deputy lieutenant of Bedfordshire on 31 March 1906. In 1912, he became Lord Lieutenant of Bedfordshire (until 1936).

Whitbread was appointed a Companion of the Order of the Bath in the 1917 Birthday Honours.

== Family ==
On 16 January 1904, he married Madeline Bourke, the granddaughter of the 5th Earl of Mayo. They had three children together.

- Major Simon Whitbread (born 12 October 1904, died 24 August 1985)
- Anne Joscelyne Whitbread (born 9 November 1906, died 1936)
- Humphrey Whitbread (born 7 February 1912, died 4 July 2000)

Honorary titles
Preceded by The Lord St John of Bletso	Lord Lieutenant of Bedfordshire; 1912–1936	Succeeded by The Lord Luke
Parliament of the United Kingdom
Preceded by Cyril Flower	Member of Parliament for Luton; 1892–1895	Succeeded by Thomas Ashton
Preceded by George Montagu	Member of Parliament for Huntingdon; 1906–1910	Succeeded by John Cator
