= Ralph Rokeby =

Ralph Rokeby may refer to one of two men:

- Ralph Rokeby (died 1595), English lawyer and historian, father-in-law of Sir John Hotham, 1st Baronet
- Ralph Rokeby (died 1596), English barrister and judge

One of these two men was MP for Huntingdon in 1571, but it is not known which one.

== See also ==
- Rokeby (disambiguation)
