= William Wightman (English MP for Huntingdon) =

Member of the Parliament of England

William Wightman MP

Member of Parliament for Huntingdon
- In office February 1388 – 1393
- Preceded by: William Luton
- Succeeded by: William Albon
- In office 1361–1386
- Succeeded by: William Luton

Personal details
- Born: 1335
- Died: 1405 (aged 69–70)

William Wightman (c. 1335 – 1404, 1405 or 1406) was a yeoman and English MP for the constituency of Huntingdon between 1361 and 1391. He is most notable for having a long uninterrupted service in the House, despite the volatility of the period.

== Personal life ==
He married Agnes in February 1383.
