= 1873 Huntingdon by-election =

UK Parliamentary by-election

The 1873 Huntingdon by-election was fought on 17 December 1873. The by-election was fought due to the death of the incumbent MP of the Conservative Party, Thomas Baring. It was won by the Conservative candidate, John Burgess Karslake.
