= Thomas Hall =

Thomas Hall may refer to:

== Business and industry ==
- Thomas Young Hall (1802–1870), English mining engineer and coal mine owner
- Thomas Hall (railway engineer) (1823–1889), British railway engineer of the Namaqualand Railway
- Thomas Skarratt Hall (1836–1903), Australian bank manager and mine director in Queensland
- Thomas Ramsay Hall (1879–1950), Australian architect in Brisbane

== Law and politics ==
=== United Kingdom ===
- Thomas Hall (MP for Ipswich) (fl. 1510), English MP for Ipswich
- Thomas Hall (by 1488 – 1550), English MP for Huntingdon
- Thomas Hall (MP for Lincolnshire) (1619–1667), English MP for Lincolnshire
- Thomas William Hall (1861–1937), British solicitor and philatelist

=== United States ===
- Thomas H. Hall (1773–1853), American U.S. congressman for North Carolina
- Thomas Hall (North Dakota politician) (1869–1958), American U.S. congressman for North Dakota
- Thomas Hall (Ohio politician), Ohio state Representative

=== Elsewhere ===
- Thomas Murray Hall (1859–1927), Australian accountant and member of the Queensland Legislative Council

== Religion ==
- Thomas Hall (minister, born 1610) (1610–1665), English Presbyterian clergyman and author
- Thomas Hall (minister at Leghorn) (1750–1825), Chaplain to the British Factory at Leghorn
- Thomas Cuming Hall (1858–1936), American theologian

== Others ==
- Thomasine Hall (fl. 1620s), also Thomas Hall, sexually ambiguous person in colonial Virginia
- Thomas Simpson Hall (1808–1870), Anglo-Australian pastoralist
- Thomas Hall (murderer) (1848–?), New Zealand commission agent, forger and murderer
- Thomas Sergeant Hall (1858–1915), Australian geologist
- T. Proctor Hall (1858–1931), Canadian physician and polymath
- Thomas Aubrey Chappé Hall (1873–1958), New Zealand wood carver and farmer
- Thomas Victor Hall (1879–1965), American illustrator, painter and sculptor
- Thomas L. Hall (1893–1918), American World War I Army soldier
- Thomas F. Hall (born 1939), United States Naval Officer
- Thomas Hall (cricketer, born 1969), English cricketer
- Thomas Hall (canoeist) (born 1982), Canadian canoeist

== Buildings ==
- Thomas Hall (Gainesville, Florida), 1905 building on the University of Florida campus
- Thomas Hall, Exeter, one of the University of Exeter Halls of Residence, England

== See also ==
- Tom Hall (disambiguation)
- Tommy Hall (disambiguation)
