= Tommy Hall =

Tommy Hall may refer to:

- Tommy Hall (cyclist) (1887–1949), British cyclist
- Tommy Hall (footballer, born 1876) (1876–1955), English footballer
- Tommy Hall (footballer, born 1891), English football inside forward with Sunderland, Newcastle and Gillingham
- Tommy Hall (footballer, born 1908) (1908–1973), English football wing half with Darlington
- Tommy Hall (musician) (born 1943), American musician with the band 13th Floor Elevators

== See also ==
- Thomas Hall (disambiguation)
- Tom Hall (disambiguation)
