= William Albon =

MP for Huntingdon

William Albon MP

Member of Parliament for Huntingdon
- In office 1393–1394
- Preceded by: William Wightman
- Succeeded by: Henry Proude

Personal details
- Died: c. 1394

William Albon (died c. 1394) was the MP for Huntingdon in 1393.

== Sources ==
J. S. Roskell; L. Clark; C. Rawcliffe, eds. (1993). The History of Parliament: the House of Commons 1386-1421.
