= John Abbotsley =

Member of the Parliament of England

John Abbotsley MP

Member of Parliament for Huntingdon
- In office 1420–1421
- Preceded by: Richard Spicer
- Succeeded by: Robert Peck II

John Abbotsley (or Albotysle) (1395–1460 or 1465) was a member of parliament for the constituency of Huntingdon borough in the fifteenth century.

== Career ==
Abbotsley performed other duties for the crown including that of justice of the peace (in May 1434), coroner (in 1450), and elector of Huntingdon borough in 1447, 1449, and 1450 the latter while also coroner. He was MP three times, in 1420, 1427–8, and 1442.

It has been suggested that he was a 'lawyer with a modest practice' in the region, on account of these official positions and that he was one of the local gentry who in 1434 was commissioned to take a general oath from the community to the keep the king's peace. Prior to this, he had been responsible for assisting with the conveyance of property amongst the local gentry.

== Death ==
It is unclear whether he died in 1460 or 1465, but either way, he or his heirs and feoffees were being sued by the latter date, by one William Moyne over a Huntingdon messuage called The Crown. Moyne (or 'Moigne') asserted in Chancery that he had paid Abbotsley £50 for a quarter of the purchase price- 'and to have given ample sureties for the rest'- but Abbotsley continued to deny him access to the property. It is possible that the case was not resolved until the latter's son inherited.
