= Huntingdon (constituency) =

UK Parliament constituency (1801–1918, 1983 onwards)

Coordinates: 52.34°N 0.19°W

- County constituency for the House of Commons
- Interactive map of boundaries from 2024
- Location within the East of England
- County: Cambridgeshire
- Electorate: 75,590 (March 2020)
- Major settlements: Huntingdon, St Ives, Godmanchester

Current constituency
- Created: 1983
- Member of Parliament: Benjamin Obese-Jecty (Conservative)
- Seats: One
- Created from: Huntingdonshire and Peterborough

1885–1918
- Seats: One
- Type of constituency: County constituency
- Created from: Huntingdonshire
- Replaced by: Huntingdonshire

c1290–1885
- Seats: c1290–1868: Two; 1868–1885: One
- Type of constituency: Borough constituency

Huntingdon is a constituency (Note: A county constituency (for the purposes of election expenses and type of returning officer)) west of Cambridge in Cambridgeshire and including its namesake town of Huntingdon. It has been represented in the House of Commons of the UK Parliament since 2024 by Benjamin Obese-Jecty of the Conservative Party. (Note: As with all constituencies, the constituency elects one Member of Parliament (MP) by the first past the post system of election at least every five years, though this was not the case in its first creation)

Before 2024, Huntingdon was considered a safe Conservative seat and was the seat of John Major, the Prime Minister from 1990 to 1997.

First established around the time of the Model Parliament in 1295, Huntingdon was the seat of Oliver Cromwell in 1628–1629 and 1640–1642.

== Constituency profile ==
Huntingdon is a rural constituency located in Cambridgeshire, although it was previously within the now-defunct county of Huntingdonshire. Its largest town is Huntingdon, which has a population of around 26,000. Other settlements in the constituency include the towns of Godmanchester and St Ives and the villages of Brampton, Buckden, Sawtry, Warboys and Somersham. The constituency includes a number of current and former Royal Air Force bases; RAF Molesworth, RAF Alconbury and RAF Wyton are still operational. Huntingdon, Godmanchester and St Ives are historic, agricultural market towns. The area is generally wealthy with low levels of deprivation. House prices in the constituency are in line with the national average.

In general, residents have average levels of education and high rates of household income. A high proportion of residents work in the manufacturing and defence industries. White people made up 91% of the population at the 2021 census. At the local council level, the towns are mostly represented by Liberal Democrats and independents whilst the rural areas in the constituency's north and west elected Conservative councillors. An estimated 53% of voters in the constituency supported leaving the European Union in the 2016 referendum, similar to the nationwide figure of 52%.

== History ==
The constituency of Huntingdon has existed in three separate forms: as a parliamentary borough from 1295, represented in the House of Commons of England until 1707, then in the House of Commons of Great Britain from 1707 to 1800, and then in the House of Commons of the Parliament of the United Kingdom from 1801 to 1885; as a division of a parliamentary county from 1885 to 1918; and as a county constituency from 1983 until the present day.

Representatives for the seat, the standard two burgesses per parliamentary borough, were summoned to form the first fully assembled parliament, the Model Parliament in 1295 and at all parliaments assembled from then until 1868, in which year the constituency was reduced to a single-member borough in accordance with the Reform Act 1867. In the mid-17th century, this was Oliver Cromwell's constituency.

Under the Redistribution of Seats Act 1885, the parliamentary borough was abolished altogether and the two-member parliamentary county of Huntingdonshire was replaced by the two-single member seats formally known as the Northern or Ramsey Division and the Southern or Huntingdon Division. It was abolished under the Representation of the People Act 1918 when it was re-combined with Ramsey and Huntingdonshire was re-established as a single member constituency.

As a result of the Local Government Act 1972, the two counties of Cambridgeshire and Isle of Ely, and Huntingdon and Peterborough were merged to form the non-metropolitan county of Cambridgeshire, with effect from 1 April 1974. However, the next redistribution did not come into effect until the 1983 general election, when the Huntingdonshire constituency was abolished once again, with the majority comprising the re-established county constituency of Huntingdon which also included rural areas to the west of Peterborough.

There were significant boundary changes at the 1997 general election, when the neighbouring seat of North West Cambridgeshire was created from areas previously in the seats of Huntingdon and Peterborough.

The former Conservative Prime Minister (1990–1997) John Major represented the seat from its re-creation in 1983 until his retirement in 2001. His majority in 1992 (36,230) was the largest majority for any member of parliament post-1832 until 2017, in which George Howarth won a 42,214 vote majority in Knowsley.

== Boundaries and boundary changes ==
=== Historic ===
==== 1832–1885 ====
- The townships of Huntingdon and Godmanchester.

==== 1885–1918 ====
- The Sessional Divisions of Leightonstone and Toseland.

The new county division incorporated the towns of Huntingdon, Godmanchester, and St Neots.

==== 1983–1997 ====
- The District of Huntingdon wards of Brampton, Bury, Earith, Ellington, Elton, Farcet, Fenstanton, Godmanchester, Hemingford Abbots and Hilton, Hemingford Grey, Houghton and Wyton, Huntingdon North, Huntingdon West, Kimbolton, Needingworth, Ramsey, Sawtry, Somersham, Stilton, St Ives North, St Ives South, The Stukeleys, Upwood and The Raveleys, Warboys, and Yaxley; and
- The City of Peterborough wards of Barnack, Glinton, Northborough, Werrington, and Wittering.

The re-established seat comprised the majority of the abolished Huntingdonshire constituency, including Huntingdon, Godmanchester, Ramsey and St Ives, together with rural areas to the west of Peterborough, including Barnack and Werrington.

==== 1997–2010 ====
- The District of Huntingdonshire wards of Brampton, Buckden, Eaton Ford, Eaton Socon, Ellington, Eynesbury, Fenstanton, Godmanchester, Gransden, Hemingford Abbots and Hilton, Hemingford Grey, Houghton and Wyton, Huntingdon North, Huntingdon West, Kimbolton, Needingworth, Paxton, Priory Park, St Ives North, St Ives South, Staughton, The Offords, and The Stukeleys.

Gained the parts of the District of Huntingdon, including St Neots, which had previously been part of the abolished South West Cambridgeshire constituency. The City of Peterborough ward of Werrington was transferred to the Peterborough constituency. Remaining Peterborough wards and northern parts of the District of Huntingdon, including Ramsey, were included in the new constituency of North West Cambridgeshire.

==== 2010–2024 ====
Map of boundaries 2010–2024

- The District of Huntingdonshire wards of Alconbury and The Stukeleys, Brampton, Buckden, Fenstanton, Godmanchester, Gransden and The Offords, Huntingdon East, Huntingdon North, Huntingdon West, Kimbolton and Staughton, Little Paxton, St Ives East, St Ives South, St Ives West, St Neots Eaton Ford, St Neots Eaton Socon, St Neots Eynesbury, St Neots Priory Park, and The Hemingfords.

Local authority wards revised. Further minor loss to North West Cambridgeshire.

=== Current ===
Following the 2023 review of Westminster constituencies, which came into effect for the 2024 general election, the constituency is composed of the following electoral wards:

- The District of Huntingdonshire wards of Alconbury, Brampton, Buckden, Godmanchester & Hemingford Abbots, Great Staughton, Hemingford Grey & Houghton, Holywell-cum-Needingworth, Huntingdon East, Huntingdon North, Kimbolton, St Ives East, St Ives South, St Ives West, Sawtry, Somersham, The Stukeleys, and Warboys.

The seat was subject to major changes with the town of St Neots being moved to the new constituency of St Neots and Mid Cambridgeshire, partly offset by the transfer of mainly rural areas to the north from North West Cambridgeshire. The constituency consists of the towns of Huntingdon, St Ives, Godmanchester and a number of smaller settlements in Western Cambridgeshire.

== Members of Parliament ==
=== MPs c1290–1660 ===
Parliament	First member	Second member
1361	William Wightman	
1365	William Wightman	
1366	William Wightman	
1369	William Wightman	
1371	William Wightman	
1372	William Wightman	
1373	William Wightman	
1376	William Wightman	
1377 (Jan)	William Wightman	
1377 (Oct)	William Wightman	
1378	William Wightman	
1380 (Jan)	William Wightman	
1381	William Wightman	
1382 (May)	William Wightman	
1382 (Oct)	William Wightman	
1383 (Oct)	William Wightman	
1384 (Apr)	William Wightman	
1384 (Nov)	William Wightman	
1386	William Luton	Thomas Daniel
1388 (Feb)	William Wightman	Thomas Daniel
1388 (Sep)	William Wightman	Thomas Daniel
1390 (Jan)	William Wightman	Thomas Daniel
1390 (Nov)		
1391	William Wightman	William Luton
1393	William Albon	John Pabenham
1394	Henry Proude	John Dunhead I
1395	John Cutler	John Dunhead II
1397 (Jan)	Walter Willardby	John Dunhead I
1397 (Sep)	John Hawkin	John Dunhead II
1399	John Hawkin	Richard Prentice
1401	John Sabrisforth	John Rous
1402	Walter Devenham	Ambrose Newton
1404 (Jan)		
1404 (Oct)		
1406	John Hawkin	Richard Prentice
1407	Richard Prentice	John Navet
1410		
1411	Robert Peck	Thomas Freeman
1413 (Feb)		
1413 (May)	Robert Peck	John Denton
1414 (Apr)	Robert Peck	John Denton
1414 (Nov)	Roger Chamberlain	John Foxton
1415	Robert Peck	John Bickley
1416 (Mar)	Robert Peck	John Denton
1416 (Oct)		
1417	John Fette	Richard Freeman
1419	Richard Spicer	Hugh Parson
1420	John Abbotsley	John Foxton
1421 (May)	Robert Peck II	John Colles
1421 (Dec)	Robert Peck II	George Gidding
1510–1523	No names known	
1529	Thomas Hall	William Webbe
1536	?	
1539	?	
1542	?	
1545	?	
1547	John Arscott	John Millicent
1553 (Mar)	William Tyrwhitt	Thomas Maria Wingfield
1553 (Oct)	Thomas Maria Wingfield	John Purvey
1554 (Apr)	Thomas Maria Wingfield	Simon Throckmorton
1554 (Nov)	Philip Clampe	William Horwood
1555	Robert Brockbank	Thomas Worlich
1558	Robert Brockbank	John Brigandine
1559 (Jan)	Richard Patrick	William Symcots
1562–3	Richard Gooderick	George Blyth
1571	Tristram Tyrwhitt	Ralph Rokeby
1572 (Apr)	Thomas Slade	John Turpin
1584 (Nov)	Francis Flower	William Cervington
1586	Francis Flower	William Cervington
1588 (Oct)	Francis Flower	William Cervington
1593	Robert Lee	Robert Cromwell
1597 (Oct)	Richard Cromwell	Robert Cooke
1601	William Beecher	Thomas Chichley
1604	Henry Cromwell	Thomas Harley
1614	Sir Christopher Hatton	Sir Miles Fleetwood
1621–1622	Sir Henry St John	Sir Miles Sandys, 1st Baronet
1624	Sir Arthur Mainwaring	Sir Henry St John
1625	Sir Arthur Mainwaring	Sir Henry St John
1626	Sir Arthur Mainwaring	John Goldsborough
1628	Oliver Cromwell	James Montagu
1629–1640	No Parliaments summoned	
Apr 1640	Robert Bernard	William Montagu
Nov 1640	George Montagu	Edward Montagu, ennobled in 1644 and replaced by Abraham Burrell
1653	Not represented in Barebones Parliament	
1654	John Bernard	
1656	John Bernard	
1659	John Thurloe	Sir John Bernard
1659	Abraham Burrell	

=== MPs 1660–1868 ===
Year	First member	First party	Second member	Second party
1660	John Bernard		Nicholas Pedley	
1661	Sir John Cotton, 3rd Bt		Lionel Walden	
Apr 1679	Hon. Sidney Wortley-Montagu		Sir Nicholas Pedley	
Aug 1679	Hon. Sidney Wortley-Montagu		Lionel Walden	
1685	Hon. Oliver Montagu		Lionel Walden	
1689	John Bigg		Hon. Sidney Wortley-Montagu	
1690	Hon. Richard Montagu		Hon. Sidney Wortley-Montagu	
1695	Hon. Richard Montagu		John Pocklington	
1697	Francis Wortley-Montagu		John Pocklington	
1698	Francis Wortley-Montagu		Edward Carteret	
1701	Francis Wortley-Montagu		The Earl of Orrery	
1702	Anthony Hammond		The Earl of Orrery	
1705	Edward Wortley Montagu		Sir John Cotton, 4th Bt	
1706	Edward Wortley Montagu		John Pedley	
1708	Edward Wortley Montagu		Francis Page	
1713	Sidney Wortley-Montagu		Viscount Hinchingbrooke	
1722	Edward Wortley Montagu		Roger Handasyde	
1734	Edward Montagu		Roger Handasyde	
May 1741	Edward Montagu		Hon. Wills Hill	
Dec 1741	Edward Montagu		Albert Nesbitt	
1747	Edward Montagu		Kelland Courtenay	
1748	Edward Montagu		John Montagu	
1754	Edward Montagu		Robert Jones	
1768	Henry Seymour		Robert Jones	
Feb 1774	Henry Seymour		Hon. William Augustus Montagu	
Oct 1774	George Wombwell		Hon. William Augustus Montagu	
1776	George Wombwell		The Lord Mulgrave	Tory
1780	Hugh Palliser	Tory	The Lord Mulgrave	Tory
1784	Sir Walter Rawlinson	Tory	Lancelot Brown	Tory
1787	Sir Walter Rawlinson	Tory	John Willett Payne	Tory
Jun 1790	Hon. John George Montagu	Tory	John Willett Payne	Tory
Dec 1790	Henry Speed	Tory	John Willett Payne	Tory
1796	William Henry Fellowes	Tory	John Calvert	Tory
1807	William Meeke Farmer	Tory	John Calvert	Tory
1809	Samuel Farmer	Tory	John Calvert	Tory
1818	William Augustus Montagu	Tory	John Calvert	Tory
1820	Earl of Ancram	Tory	John Calvert	Tory
1824	James Stuart	Tory	John Calvert	Tory
1831	Jonathan Peel	Tory	Sir Frederick Pollock	Tory
1834	Jonathan Peel	Conservative	Sir Frederick Pollock	Conservative
1844	Jonathan Peel	Conservative	Thomas Baring	Conservative
1868	representation reduced to one member			

=== MPs 1868–1918 ===
Election	Member	Party
1868	Thomas Baring	Conservative
1873 by-election	Sir John Burgess Karslake	Conservative
1876 by-election	Edward Montagu	Conservative
1884 by-election	Sir Robert Peel	Conservative
1885	Thomas Coote	Liberal
1886	Arthur Smith-Barry	Conservative
1900	George Montagu	Conservative
1906	Samuel Whitbread	Liberal
1910 (Jan)	John Cator	Conservative
1918	constituency abolished, Huntingdonshire from 1918	

=== MPs since 1983 ===
Election	Member	Party
1983	Rt Hon John Major	Conservative
2001	Jonathan Djanogly	Conservative
2024	Ben Obese-Jecty	Conservative

== Elections ==
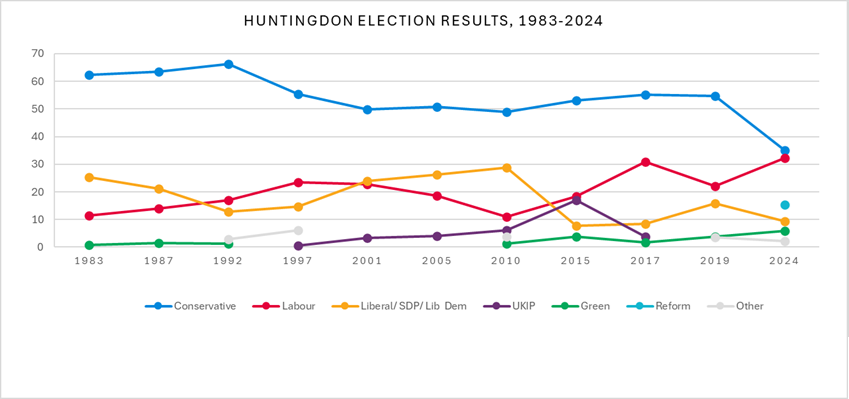
Huntingdon election results 1983–2024

=== Elections in the 2020s ===
General election 2024: Huntingdon
Party	Candidate	Votes	%	±%
Conservative	Ben Obese-Jecty	18,257	35.1	−24.1
Labour	Alex Bulat	16,758	32.2	+11.4
Reform	Sarah Smith	8,039	15.4	N/A
Liberal Democrats	Mark Argent	4,821	9.3	−4.7
Green	Georgie Hunt	3,042	5.8	+2.3
Independent	Chan Raj Abraham	1,123	2.2	N/A
Majority		1,499	2.9	−35.5
Turnout		52,040	65.8	−8.7
Registered electors		79,074		
Conservative hold		Swing	−17.8	

=== Elections in the 2010s ===
2019 notional result
Party	Vote	%
Conservative	33,352	59.2
Labour	11,707	20.8
Liberal Democrats	7,899	14.0
Green	1,952	3.5
Others	1,407	2.5
Turnout	56,317	74.5
Electorate	75,590	

General election 2019: Huntingdon
Party	Candidate	Votes	%	±%
Conservative	Jonathan Djanogly	32,386	54.8	−0.3
Labour	Samuel Sweek	13,003	22.0	−8.9
Liberal Democrats	Mark Argent	9,432	15.9	+7.4
Green	Daniel Laycock	2,233	3.8	+2.0
Independent	Paul Bullen	1,789	3.0	N/A
Independent	Tom Varghese	304	0.5	N/A
Majority		19,383	32.8	+8.6
Turnout		59,147	69.9	−0.9
Conservative hold		Swing	+4.3	

General election 2017: Huntingdon
Party	Candidate	Votes	%	±%
Conservative	Jonathan Djanogly	32,915	55.1	+2.1
Labour	Nik Johnson	18,440	30.9	+12.6
Liberal Democrats	Rod Cantrill	5,090	8.5	+0.7
UKIP	Paul Bullen	2,180	3.7	−13.2
Green	Thomas MacLennan	1,095	1.8	−2.1
Majority		14,475	24.2	−10.5
Turnout		59,720	70.8	+2.9
Conservative hold		Swing	−5.2	

General election 2015: Huntingdon
Party	Candidate	Votes	%	±%
Conservative	Jonathan Djanogly	29,652	53.0	+4.1
Labour	Nik Johnson	10,248	18.3	+7.3
UKIP	Paul Bullen	9,473	16.9	+10.9
Liberal Democrats	Rod Cantrill	4,375	7.8	−21.1
Green	Thomas MacLennan	2,178	3.9	+2.7
Majority		19,404	34.7	+15.8
Turnout		55,926	67.9	+3.0
Conservative hold		Swing	−1.6	

General election 2010: Huntingdon
Party	Candidate	Votes	%	±%
Conservative	Jonathan Djanogly	26,516	48.9	−1.9
Liberal Democrats	Martin Land	15,697	28.9	+2.3
Labour	Anthea Cox	5,982	11.0	−7.4
UKIP	Ian Curtis	3,258	6.0	+1.8
Independent	Jonathan Salt	1,432	2.6	N/A
Green	John Clare	652	1.2	N/A
Monster Raving Loony	Lord Toby Jug	548	1.0	N/A
Animal Protection	Carrie Holliman	181	0.3	N/A
Majority		10,819	19.9	−4.2
Turnout		54,266	64.9	+2.3
Conservative hold		Swing	−2.1	

=== Elections in the 2000s ===
General election 2005: Huntingdon
Party	Candidate	Votes	%	±%
Conservative	Jonathan Djanogly	26,646	50.8	+0.9
Liberal Democrats	Julian Huppert	13,799	26.3	+2.4
Labour	Stephen Sartain	9,821	18.7	−4.1
UKIP	Derek Norman	2,152	4.1	+0.7
Majority		12,847	24.5	−1.5
Turnout		52,418	62.5	+1.4
Conservative hold		Swing	−0.8	

General election 2001: Huntingdon
Party	Candidate	Votes	%	±%
Conservative	Jonathan Djanogly	24,507	49.9	−5.4
Liberal Democrats	Michael Pope	11,715	23.9	+9.2
Labour	Takki Sulaiman	11,211	22.8	−0.7
UKIP	Derek Norman	1,656	3.4	+2.8
Majority		12,792	26.0	−5.8
Turnout		49,089	61.1	−13.8
Conservative hold		Swing	−7.3	

=== Elections in the 1990s ===
The constituency underwent boundary changes prior to the 1997 election and the changes are not based on the 1992 result.

General election 1997: Huntingdon
Party	Candidate	Votes	%	±%
Conservative	John Major	31,501	55.3	−9.9
Labour	Jason Reece	13,361	23.5	+6.6
Liberal Democrats	Matthew Owen	8,390	14.7	−6.4
Referendum	David Bellamy	3,114	5.5	N/A
UKIP	Charles Coyne	331	0.6	N/A
Christian Democrat	Veronica Hufford	177	0.3	N/A
Independent	Duncan Robertson	89	0.2	N/A
Majority		18,140	31.8	−6.8
Turnout		56,963	74.9	−4.3
Conservative hold		Swing	−8.3	

General election 1992: Huntingdon
Party	Candidate	Votes	%	±%
Conservative	John Major	48,662	66.2	+2.6
Labour	Hugh Seckleman	12,432	16.9	+3.0
Liberal Democrats	Andrew Duff	9,386	12.8	−8.3
Liberal	Paul Wiggin	1,045	1.4	N/A
Green	Deborah Birkhead	846	1.2	−0.2
Monster Raving Loony	Screaming Lord Sutch	728	1.0	N/A
Conservative Thatcherite	Michael Flanagan	231	0.3	N/A
Gremloids	Lord Buckethead	107	0.1	N/A
Forward to Mars Party	Charles S. Cockell	91	0.1	N/A
Natural Law	David Shepherd	26	0.0	N/A
Majority		36,230	49.3	+6.8
Turnout		73,554	79.2	+5.2
Conservative hold		Swing	−0.2	

=== Elections in the 1980s ===
General election 1987: Huntingdon
Party	Candidate	Votes	%	±%
Conservative	John Major	40,530	63.6	+1.2
SDP	Anthony Nicholson	13,486	21.1	−4.2
Labour	David Brown	8,883	13.9	+2.4
Green	William Lavin	874	1.4	+0.6
Majority		27,044	42.5	+5.4
Turnout		63,773	74.0	+2.4
Conservative hold		Swing		

General election 1983: Huntingdon
Party	Candidate	Votes	%	±%
Conservative	John Major	34,254	62.4	
Liberal	Sheila Gatiss	13,906	25.3	
Labour	Mark Slater	6,317	11.5	
Ecology	Timothy Eiloart	444	0.8	
Majority		20,348	37.1	
Turnout		54,921	71.6	
Conservative win (new seat)				

=== Elections in the 1910s ===
General election December 1910: Huntingdon
Party	Candidate	Votes	%	±%
Conservative	John Cator	2,287	51.7	−2.3
Liberal	Oliver Brett	2,139	48.3	+2.3
Majority		148	3.4	−4.6
Turnout		4,426	85.5	−2.7
Conservative hold		Swing	−2.3	

General election January 1910: Huntingdon
Party	Candidate	Votes	%	±%
Conservative	John Cator	2,466	54.0	+9.4
Liberal	Oliver Brett	2,099	46.0	−9.4
Majority		367	8.0	N/A
Turnout		4,565	88.2	+5.1
Conservative gain from Liberal		Swing	+9.4	

=== Elections in the 1900s ===
General election 1906: Huntingdon
Party	Candidate	Votes	%	±%
Liberal	Samuel Whitbread	2,426	55.4	+8.9
Conservative	John Cator	1,957	44.6	−8.9
Majority		469	10.8	N/A
Turnout		4,383	83.1	+7.3
Registered electors		5,272		
Liberal gain from Conservative		Swing	+8.9	

General election 1900: Huntingdon
Party	Candidate	Votes	%	±%
Conservative	George Montagu	2,118	53.5	−0.4
Liberal	Charles Adeane	1,838	46.5	+0.4
Majority		280	7.0	−0.8
Turnout		3,956	75.8	−6.8
Registered electors		5,222		
Conservative hold		Swing	−0.4	

=== Elections in the 1890s ===
General election 1895: Huntingdon
Party	Candidate	Votes	%	±%
Conservative	Arthur Smith-Barry	2,419	53.9	+3.7
Liberal	John Jackson Wilks	2,068	46.1	−3.7
Majority		351	7.8	+7.4
Turnout		4,487	82.6	+0.8
Registered electors		5,435		
Conservative hold		Swing	+3.7	

General election 1892: Huntingdon
Party	Candidate	Votes	%	±%
Conservative	Arthur Smith-Barry	2,251	50.2	−1.6
Liberal	Samuel Whitbread	2,229	49.8	+1.6
Majority		22	0.4	−3.2
Turnout		4,480	81.8	+3.2
Registered electors		5,479		
Conservative hold		Swing	−1.6	

=== Elections in the 1880s ===
General election 1886: Huntingdon
Party	Candidate	Votes	%	±%
Conservative	Arthur Smith-Barry	2,302	51.8	+3.4
Liberal	Thomas Coote	2,141	48.2	−3.4
Majority		161	3.6	N/A
Turnout		4,443	78.6	−2.1
Registered electors		5,655		
Conservative gain from Liberal		Swing	+3.4	

General election 1885: Huntingdon
Party	Candidate	Votes	%	±%
Liberal	Thomas Coote	2,354	51.6	N/A
Conservative	Oliver George Powlett Montagu	2,208	48.4	N/A
Majority		146	3.2	N/A
Turnout		4,562	80.7	N/A
Registered electors		5,655		
Liberal gain from Conservative		Swing	N/A	

By-election, 22 Mar 1884: Huntingdon
Party	Candidate	Votes	%	±%
Conservative	Robert Peel	455	50.5	N/A
Liberal	Charles Veasey	446	49.5	N/A
Majority		9	1.0	N/A
Turnout		901	24.6	N/A
Registered electors		3,658		
Conservative hold		Swing	N/A	

- Caused by Montagu's succession to the peerage, becoming Earl of Sandwich.

General election 1880: Huntingdon
Party	Candidate	Votes	%	±%
Conservative	Edward Montagu	Unopposed		
Registered electors		1,052		
Conservative hold				

=== Elections in the 1870s ===
By-election, 16 Feb 1876: Huntingdon
Party	Candidate	Votes	%	±%
Conservative	Edward Montagu	Unopposed		
Conservative hold				

- Caused by Karslake's resignation.

By-election, 16 Mar 1874: Huntingdon
Party	Candidate	Votes	%	±%
Conservative	John Burgess Karslake	Unopposed		
Conservative hold				

- Caused by Karslake's appointment as Attorney General for England and Wales.

General election 1874: Huntingdon
Party	Candidate	Votes	%	±%
Conservative	John Burgess Karslake	Unopposed		
Registered electors		1,049		
Conservative hold				

By-election, 20 Dec 1873: Huntingdon
Party	Candidate	Votes	%	±%
Conservative	John Burgess Karslake	499	59.4	N/A
Liberal	Arthur Arnold	341	40.6	N/A
Majority		158	18.8	N/A
Turnout		840	83.3	N/A
Registered electors		1,008		
Conservative hold				

- Caused by Baring's death.

=== Elections in the 1860s ===
General election 1868: Huntingdon
Party	Candidate	Votes	%	±%
Conservative	Thomas Baring	Unopposed		
Registered electors		976		
Conservative hold				

Seat reduced to one member

By-election, 11 July 1866: Huntingdon
Party	Candidate	Votes	%	±%
Conservative	Jonathan Peel	Unopposed		
Conservative hold				

- Caused by Peel's appointment as Secretary of State for War

General election 1865: Huntingdon
Party	Candidate	Votes	%	±%
Conservative	Thomas Baring	Unopposed		
Conservative	Jonathan Peel	Unopposed		
Registered electors		383		
Conservative hold				
Conservative hold				

=== Elections in the 1850s ===
General election 1859: Huntingdon
Party	Candidate	Votes	%	±%
Conservative	Thomas Baring	Unopposed		
Conservative	Jonathan Peel	Unopposed		
Registered electors		378		
Conservative hold				
Conservative hold				

By-election, 4 March 1858: Huntingdon
Party	Candidate	Votes	%	±%
Conservative	Jonathan Peel	Unopposed		
Conservative hold				

- Caused by Peel's appointment as Secretary of State for War.

General election 1857: Huntingdon
Party	Candidate	Votes	%	±%
Conservative	Thomas Baring	Unopposed		
Conservative	Jonathan Peel	Unopposed		
Registered electors		382		
Conservative hold				
Conservative hold				

General election 1852: Huntingdon
Party	Candidate	Votes	%	±%
Conservative	Thomas Baring	Unopposed		
Conservative	Jonathan Peel	Unopposed		
Registered electors		390		
Conservative hold				
Conservative hold				

=== Elections in the 1840s ===
General election 1847: Huntingdon
Party	Candidate	Votes	%	±%
Conservative	Thomas Baring	Unopposed		
Conservative	Jonathan Peel	Unopposed		
Registered electors		373		
Conservative hold				
Conservative hold				

By-election, 22 April 1844: Huntingdon
Party	Candidate	Votes	%	±%
Conservative	Thomas Baring	Unopposed		
Conservative hold				

- Caused by Pollock's resignation upon his appointment as Chief Justice of the Court of the Exchequer

By-election, 14 September 1841: Huntingdon
Party	Candidate	Votes	%	±%
Conservative	Frederick Pollock	Unopposed		
Conservative	Jonathan Peel	Unopposed		
Conservative hold				
Conservative hold				

- Caused by Peel's appointment as Surveyor-General of the Ordnance and Pollock's appointment as Attorney General for England and Wales

General election 1841: Huntingdon
Party	Candidate	Votes	%	±%
Conservative	Frederick Pollock	Unopposed		
Conservative	Jonathan Peel	Unopposed		
Registered electors		416		
Conservative hold				
Conservative hold				

=== Elections in the 1830s ===
General election 1837: Huntingdon
Party	Candidate	Votes	%	±%
Conservative	Frederick Pollock	Unopposed		
Conservative	Jonathan Peel	Unopposed		
Registered electors		356		
Conservative hold				
Conservative hold				

General election 1835: Huntingdon
Party	Candidate	Votes	%	±%
Conservative	Frederick Pollock	Unopposed		
Conservative	Jonathan Peel	Unopposed		
Registered electors		380		
Conservative hold				
Conservative hold				

General election 1832: Huntingdon
Party	Candidate	Votes	%	±%
Tory	Jonathan Peel	177	31.1	−15.2
Tory	Frederick Pollock	171	30.0	−16.3
Whig	James Duberley	128	22.5	+19.1
Whig	Edward Harvey Maltby	94	16.5	+12.4
Majority		43	7.5	−34.7
Turnout		287	87.8	c. +46.7
Registered electors		327		
Tory hold		Swing	−15.5	
Tory hold		Swing	−16.0	

General election 1831: Huntingdon
Party	Candidate	Votes	%
Tory	Jonathan Peel	68	46.3
Tory	Frederick Pollock	68	46.3
Whig	Samuel Wells	6	4.1
Whig	James Duberley	5	3.4
Majority		62	42.2
Turnout		74	c. 41.1
Registered electors		c. 180	
Tory hold			
Tory hold			

General election 1830: Huntingdon
Party	Candidate	Votes	%
Tory	John Calvert (died 1844)	Unopposed	
Tory	James Stuart	Unopposed	
Whig	Samuel Wells		
Whig	Henry Sweeting		
Registered electors		c. 180	
Tory hold			
Tory hold			

Wells and Sweeting were put forward as candidates, and received "a show of hands of ten to one" against Calvert and Stuart, who had received seven and five respectively. However, the mayor declared Stuart and Calvert as having the majority of legal votes and the seat was not put to a poll.

== See also ==
- Parliamentary constituencies in Cambridgeshire
- Parliamentary constituencies in the East of England

== Notes ==
Parliament of the United Kingdom
Preceded by Blaby	Constituency represented by the chancellor of the Exchequer; 1989–1990	Succeeded by Kingston-upon-Thames
Preceded by Finchley	Constituency represented by the prime minister 1990–1997	Succeeded by Sedgefield
Preceded by Sedgefield	Constituency represented by the leader of the opposition 1997–1997	Succeeded by Richmond (Yorks)
