= Rokeby =

Rokeby is the name of:

== People ==
- Baron Rokeby, an Irish title
- Rokeby baronets, a British title
- Christopher Rokeby (died 1584), English soldier and secret agent
- David Rokeby (born 1960), Canadian artist
- Ralph Rokeby (died 1596), English barrister and judge
- Thomas de Rokeby, 15th-century English soldier
- Thomas de Rokeby (died 1356), British soldier and Crown official
- William Rokeby (died 1521), British statesman and cleric

== Places ==
=== Australia ===
- Rokeby, Tasmania, a suburb of Hobart
- Rokeby, Victoria, a town in West Gippsland

=== Canada ===
- Rokeby, Lambton County, Ontario, a community in Brooke-Alvinston
- Rokeby, Ontario, name of the townsite that became Bobcaygeon
- Rokeby, Saskatchewan, a town

=== England ===
- Rokeby, County Durham, the location of Rokeby Park
- Rokeby is a historic name for Rugby, Warwickshire, and a name for a suburb of the town

=== New Zealand ===
- Rokeby, New Zealand, a locality in the Ashburton District

=== United States ===
- Rokeby, Nebraska, an unincorporated community
- Rokeby (Barrytown, New York), listed on the National Register of Historic Places in Dutchess County, New York
- Rokeby Lock, Ohio, unincorporated community in Morgan County
- Rokeby (Ferrisburg, Vermont), a house in the underground railway and a national historic landmark, listed on the NRHP in Addison County, Vermont
- Rokeby (King George, Virginia), listed on the National Register of Historic Places in King George County, Virginia
- Rokeby (Leesburg, Virginia), listed on the National Register of Historic Places in Loudoun County, Virginia

== Schools ==
- Rokeby High School, public high school, Hobart, Tasmania
- Rokeby Preparatory School, all-male preparatory day school, Kingston upon Thames, London, England
- Rokeby School, all-male community secondary school, Newham, England

== Other uses ==
- Rokeby (poem), an 1813 poem by Sir Walter Scott
- Rokeby Airport (RKY), an airport in Queensland, Australia
- Rokeby Collection, a collection of photographs of UK railway stations
- Rokeby Park, a country house in County Durham, England
- The Rokeby Venus, the English name for Diego Velázquez painting
