= John Bickley (Huntingdon MP) =

British Member of Parliament

John Bickley was a Member of the Parliament of England for Huntingdon in 1415 and 1426.
