= 1874 Huntingdon by-election =

UK Parliamentary by-election

The 1874 Huntingdon by-election was fought on 16 March 1874. The by-election was fought due to the incumbent Conservative MP, John Burgess Karslake, becoming Attorney General for England and Wales. It was retained by the incumbent, who was unopposed.
