= John Hawkin =

English politician

John Hawkin MP

Member of Parliament for Huntingdon
- In office 1406–1407
- Succeeded by: Richard Prentice
- In office September 1397 – 1401
- Preceded by: Walter Willardby
- Succeeded by: John Sabrisforth

Personal details
- Died: c. 1394

John Hawkin (fl. 1397–1406), of Huntingdon and Great Gidding, Huntingdonshire, was an English politician.

He was a Member (MP) of the Parliament of England for Huntingdon in 1397, 1399 and 1406.
