= Richard Spicer (MP for Huntingdon) =

English politician

Richard Spicer MP

Member of Parliament for Huntingdon
- In office 1419–1420
- Preceded by: John Fette
- Succeeded by: John Abbotsley

Richard Spicer (fl. 1414) was an English politician.

He was a member (MP) of the parliament of England for Huntingdon in April and November 1414. Beyond this, nothing is recorded of his life.
