= Marsha Courneya =

Canadian screenwriter

- Occupation: Writer
- Years active: 2006–present

Marsha Courneya is a Canadian screenwriter, best known for her work on the feature film The Blue Seal.
