= 1876 Huntingdon by-election =

UK parliamentary by-election

The 1876 Huntingdon by-election was fought on 16 February 1876. The by-election was fought due to the resignation of the incumbent Conservative MP, John Burgess Karslake. It was won by the unopposed Conservative candidate Viscount Hinchingbrooke.
