= William Webbe (by 1508 – c. 1547) =

English politician

William Webbe (by 1508 – c. 1547), was an English politician. He was a member (MP) of the parliament of England for Huntingdon in 1529.
