= Aaron Tsang =

Canadian composer (born 1985)

- Born: April 18, 1985 (age 41)
- Occupation: Composer
- Years active: 2005–present
- Website: http://www.aarontsang.com

Aaron Tsang (born April 18, 1985) is a Canadian composer, best known for his work on the feature film The Blue Seal and his work scoring with Groove Games.

== Career ==
Since the age of fourteen, Tsang has been an active composer and film producer on the independent film scene in Toronto, Ontario, Canada. His work has been recognized at various film festivals, including the YoungCuts Film Festival and the Action On Film International Film Festival. Tsang obtained a Bachelor of Music and a Master of Music degree in Composition from the University of Toronto. Tsang used to teach theory and harmony part-time at the Euro-music Centre in Markham from 2012 to 2020.
