= Jonathan Peel =

British Army general (1799–1879)

Lieutenant-General The Right Honourable Jonathan Peel
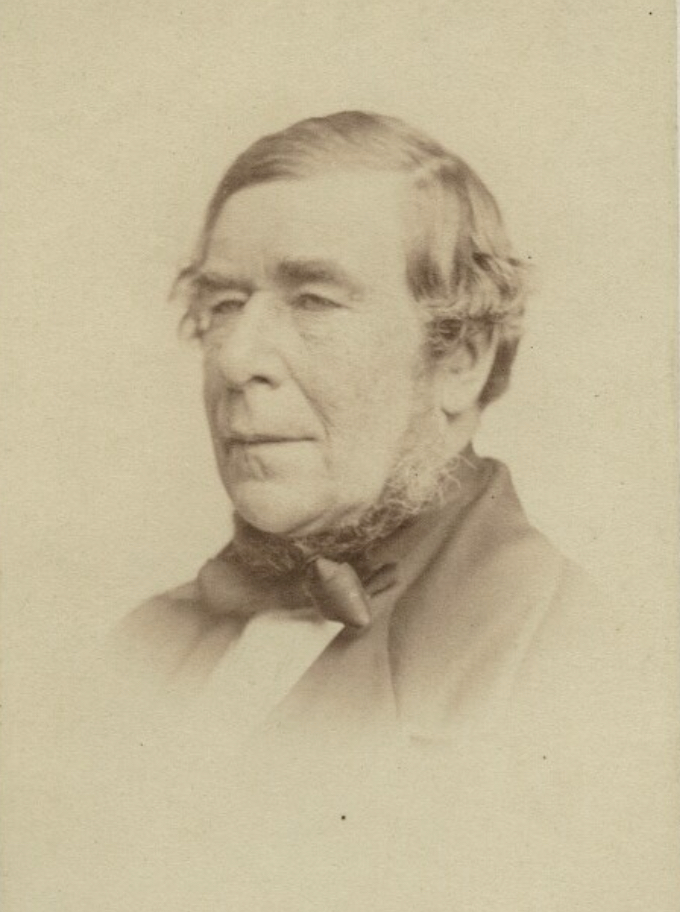
- Jonathan Peel, c. 1860s

Secretary of State for War
- In office 26 February 1858 – 11 June 1859
- Monarch: Victoria
- Prime Minister: The Earl of Derby
- Preceded by: The Lord Panmure
- Succeeded by: The Lord Herbert of Lea
- In office 6 July 1866 – 8 March 1867
- Monarch: Victoria
- Prime Minister: The Earl of Derby
- Preceded by: The Marquess of Hartington
- Succeeded by: Sir John Pakington, Bt

Personal details
- Born: 12 October 1799
- Died: 13 February 1879 (aged 79) Marble Hill, Twickenham, Middlesex, England, UK
- Party: Conservative
- Spouse: Lady Alice Kennedy (d. 1887)

Jonathan Peel, PC (12 October 1799 – 13 February 1879) was a British Army officer, Conservative politician and racehorse owner.

== Background and education ==
Peel was the fifth son of Sir Robert Peel, 1st Baronet, and his first wife Ellen (née Yates), and the younger brother of Prime Minister Sir Robert Peel, 2nd Baronet. He was educated at Rugby.

== Military career ==
Peel was commissioned into the Rifle Brigade as a 2nd Lieutenant in June 1815. His later steady rise through the ranks was obtained by purchase. Peel served as a lieutenant in the 71st Highlanders from 1819 to 1821 and in the Grenadier Guards from 1822 to 1825, as a Major in the 69th Foot from 1826 to 1827, as a Lieutenant-Colonel in the 53rd Foot in 1827, when he was placed on half-pay. He was promoted to brevet Colonel in 1841, to Major-General in 1854 and to Lieutenant-General in 1859.

== Political career ==
Peel's political career started when he was elected Member of Parliament for Norwich in 1826. He lost this seat in 1830 but returned to Parliament the following year as one of two representatives for Huntingdon, a seat he held until 1868.

He served under his brother as Surveyor-General of the Ordnance from 1841 to 1846 and was Secretary of State for War (with a seat in the cabinet) under the Earl of Derby between 1858 and 1859 and 1866 and 1867. In the latter office he was considered competent and successful and became very popular. However, he resigned in March 1867 in protest against the proposed electoral reforms. He had been admitted to the Privy Council in 1858.

== Racing ==
Apart from his military and political career Peel was also an owner of racehorses, and in 1844 his horse Orlando won the Derby, after another horse, Running Rein, had been disqualified.

== Personal life ==
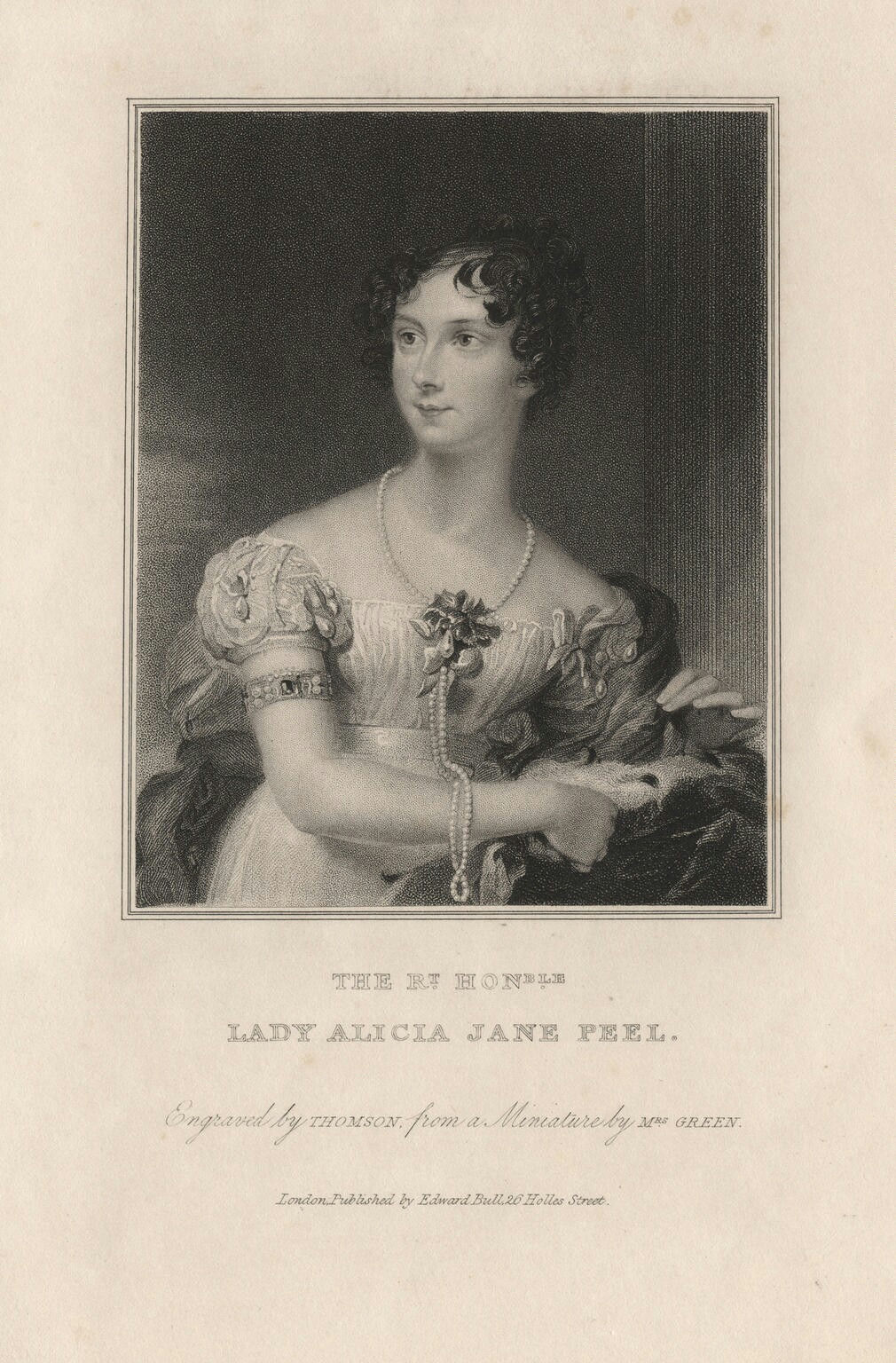
Lady Alice Jane Peel by James Thomson (Thompson), after Mary Green (née Byrne), 1833

Peel married, on 19 March 1824, Lady Alice Jane, youngest daughter of Archibald Kennedy, first Marquis of Ailsa, by whom he had eight children, five sons and three daughters. Their second son, Edmund Yates Peel, became a Lieutenant-Colonel in the Army. Their fourth son, John Peel, achieved the rank of Lieutenant-General in the Army. Their second daughter Alice married the diplomat Sir Robert Morier. Their youngest daughter, Adelaide Georgiana, married Michael Biddulph, 1st Baron Biddulph.

== Death ==
He died on 13 February 1879, aged 79, at his home, Marble Hill House, Twickenham, Middlesex, and was buried in Twickenham new cemetery on 19 February. His widow died in 1887.

== See also ==
- Earl Peel

== Sources ==
- Parker, Charles Stuart (1911). "Peel, Sir Robert" . In Chisholm, Hugh (ed.). Encyclopædia Britannica. Vol. 21 (11th ed.). Cambridge University Press. pp. 40–44.
- Boase, George Clement (1895). "Peel, Jonathan" . In Lee, Sidney (ed.). Dictionary of National Biography. Vol. 44. London: Smith, Elder & Co.
- Eadie, Emma. "Peel, Jonathan (1799–1879)". Oxford Dictionary of National Biography (online ed.). Oxford University Press. doi:10.1093/ref:odnb/21760. (Subscription, Wikipedia Library access or UK public library membership required.)

Parliament of the United Kingdom
Preceded by William Smith; Richard Hanbury Gurney	Member of Parliament for Norwich; 1826–1830; With: William Smith	Succeeded by Richard Hanbury Gurney; Robert Grant
Preceded by John Calvert; James Stuart	Member of Parliament for Huntingdon; 1831 – 1868; With: Sir Frederick Pollock, Bt 1831–1844; Thomas Baring 1844–1868	Succeeded by Thomas Baring
Political offices
Preceded by Charles Richard Fox	Surveyor-General of the Ordnance; 1841–1846	Succeeded by Charles Richard Fox
Preceded by The Lord Panmure	Secretary of State for War; 1858–1859	Succeeded by Sidney Herbert
Preceded by Marquess of Hartington	Secretary of State for War; 1866–1867	Succeeded by Sir John Pakington, Bt.
