= Edward James Pollock =

Sir Edward James Pollock (1 February 1841 – 14 April 1930) was a British barrister who served as Official Referee of Supreme Court of Judicature from 1897 to 1927.

The eighth or ninth son of Sir Frederick Pollock, Lord Chief Baron of the Exchequer, from his father's second marriage, Edward Pollock initially qualified as a doctor, becoming MRCS in 1863, a LSA in 1866, and a FRCS in 1868. After returning from a long visit to the United States, he decided to enter the legal profession, and was called to the Bar by the Inner Temple in 1872. He acquired a good common law practice, but his speaking voice was ruined by an operation, reducing it to a whisper. The Attorney-General, Sir Robert Reid (later Lord Loreburn) tried to secure an official appointment for Pollock, but the Liberal government fell before this could take place.

In 1897, on the elevation of Edward Ridley to the High Court bench, the Conservative Lord Halsbury appointed Pollock as an Official Referee of the Supreme Court of Judicature in succession. He was knighted in 1922 and retired in 1927, aged 86 and after thirty years' service.

Pollock married in 1871 Alice Georgina de la Rue (died 1929), eldest daughter of Warren De la Rue.
