= Sir Frederick Pollock, 1st Baronet =

British lawyer and Tory politician (1783–1870)

The Right Honourable Sir Frederick Pollock Bt
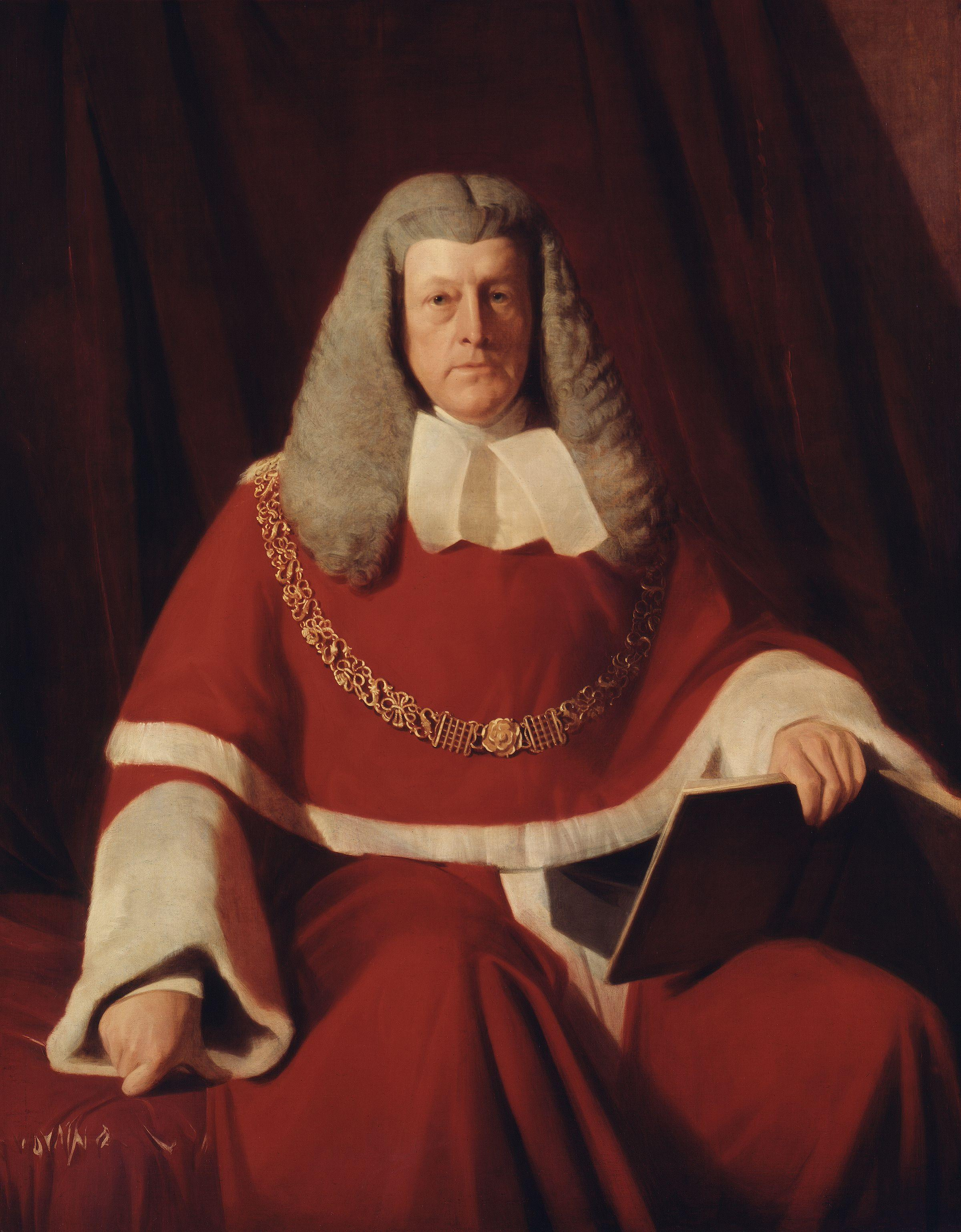
- Portrait, 1847

Attorney General
- In office 17 December 1834 – 8 April 1835
- Monarch: William IV
- Prime Minister: Sir Robert Peel
- In office 6 September 1841 – 15 April 1844
- Monarch: Victoria
- Prime Minister: Sir Robert Peel

Personal details
- Born: 23 September 1783 Charing Cross, London
- Died: 28 August 1870 (aged 86)
- Party: Tory
- Education: Trinity College, Cambridge

Sir Jonathan Frederick Pollock, 1st Baronet, PC (23 September 1783 – 28 August 1870) was a British lawyer and Tory politician.

== Background and education ==
Pollock was the son of saddler to HM King George III David Pollock, of Charing Cross, London, and the elder brother of Field Marshal Sir George Pollock, 1st Baronet. An elder brother, Sir David Pollock, was a judge in India.

The Pollock family were a branch of that family of Balgray, Dumfriesshire; David Pollock's father was a burgess of Berwick-upon-Tweed, and his grandfather a yeoman of Durham. His business as a saddler was given the official custom of the royal family. Sir John Pollock, 4th Baronet, great-great-grandson of David Pollock, stated in Time's Chariot (1950) that David was, "perhaps without knowing it", Pollock of Balgray, the senior line of the family (Pollock of Pollock or Pollock of that ilk) having died out.

Pollock was educated at St Paul's School and Trinity College, Cambridge. He was Senior Wrangler at Cambridge University. He is also thought to be one of the founding members of the Cambridge Union Society, along with Henry Bickersteth and Sir Edward Hall Alderson, both of Gonville and Caius College.

== Political, legal and mathematical careers ==
Pollock was Member of Parliament (MP) for Huntingdon from 1831 to 1844. He served as Attorney General between 1834 and 1835 and 1841 and 1844 in the Tory administrations of Sir Robert Peel. In 1841 he was admitted to the Privy Council and in 1844 he was appointed Lord Chief Baron of the Exchequer, a post he held until 1868.

In 1854, Pollock was appointed to the Royal Commission for Consolidating the Statute Law, a royal commission to consolidate existing statutes and enactments of English law. In 1859 he presided at the Thomas Smethurst murder trial.

Having been knighted on 29 December 1834, Pollock was created a Baronet, of Hatton in the County of Middlesex, on 2 August 1866. Apart from his political and legal career Pollock was elected a Fellow of the Royal Society in 1816. He contributed a number of papers in mathematics to the Royal Society, including one on what is now known as the Pollock's conjecture.

== Family ==
Pollock died in August 1870, aged 86, and was succeeded in the baronetcy by his eldest son, William, sometime Queen's Remembrancer. His fourth son, Charles Edward Pollock, apprenticed to his father, had no university education. He became a law reporter then co-serving Baron of the Court of Exchequer, becoming the last in that appeal court. Another son, George Frederick Pollock, was Master of the Supreme Court succeeded his eldest brother as Queen's Remembrancer. Another son, Edward James Pollock, became an Official Referee.

Two of Pollock's grandsons became prominent lawyers: Sir Frederick Pollock, 3rd Baronet, was Professor of Jurisprudence at the University of Oxford; Ernest Pollock, 1st Viscount Hanworth, served as Master of the Rolls.

== Collections ==
The Library and Archives Canada holds the archives of Pollock and his family. They were donated to the Canadian Bar Association by Ernest Murray Pollock (Frederick's grandson) and transferred to Canada's national archives in 1997. The collection contains correspondence and legal documents. University College London Special Collections holds letters from Pollock to William Sharpey, written in 1868.

Parliament of the United Kingdom
Preceded by The Earl of Ancram; James Stuart	Member of Parliament for Huntingdon; 1831–1844; With: Jonathan Peel	Succeeded by Thomas Baring; Jonathan Peel
Legal offices
Preceded by Sir John Campbell	Attorney General; 1834–1835	Succeeded by Sir John Campbell
Preceded by Sir Thomas Wilde	Attorney General; 1841–1844	Succeeded by Sir William Webb Follett
Preceded by The Lord Abinger	Lord Chief Baron of the Exchequer; 1844–1866	Succeeded by Sir Fitzroy Kelly
Baronetage of the United Kingdom
New creation	Baronet (of Hatton); 1866–1870	Succeeded by William Frederick Pollock
