= James Stuart (1774–1833) =

British politician

James Stuart (12 July 1774 – 6 April 1833) was a British politician.

Stuart was one of four illegitimate children of William Stuart, 9th Baron Blantyre and Harriet Teasdale. He joined the British East India Company in 1791 as a writer (junior clerk) in Bengal, and rose to become a director of the East India Company from 1826 until his death.

He was a Member of Parliament (MP) for Huntingdon from 1822 to 1831.

Parliament of the United Kingdom
Preceded by Earl of Ancram; John Calvert	Member of Parliament for Huntingdon; 1822 – 1831; With: John Calvert	Succeeded by Jonathan Peel; Sir Frederick Pollock
