= John Foxton (MP) =

English politician

John Foxton was an English politician. He sat as MP for Huntingdon in November 1414 and 1420, during the reign of Henry V of England, at one point serving alongside Roger Chamberleyn. From 1423 until 1425, he served as bailiff of Huntingdon.

He married Agnes.
