= Thomas Hall (by 1488 – 1550) =

English politician

Thomas Hall (by 1488 – 31 December 1550), of Huntingdon and Coleby, Lincolnshire, was an English politician.

He was a member (MP) of the parliament of England for Huntingdon in 1529.
