= John Cator (Huntingdon MP) =

John Cator, JP, DL (24 September 1862 – 27 April 1944) was Conservative MP for Huntingdon.

The head of an old family with Quaker antecedents whose members included John Cator, MP between 1772 and 1793, Cator was educated was educated at Eton College and Christ Church, Oxford.

He stood unsuccessfully in 1906, won the seat from the Liberals in January 1910, and held it in December 1910. His seat was abolished in 1918. He was High Sheriff of Norfolk in 1920–21.

His daughter Elizabeth Margaret married Captain The Hon. Michael Claude Hamilton Bowes-Lyon, brother of Queen Elizabeth The Queen Mother.

== Sources ==
- Whitaker's Almanack, 1907 to 1918 editions
- Historical list of MPs^{[usurped]}
