= Tommy Hall (footballer, born 1876) =

English footballer

Personal information
- Full name: Thomas Hall
- Date of birth: 15 December 1876
- Place of birth: Macclesfield, England
- Date of death: 1955 (aged 78–79)
- Position: Wing half

Senior career*
Years	Team	Apps	(Gls)
1895–1896	Macclesfield		
1896–1901	Stockport County		
1900–1902	Glossop	53	(2)
1902–1907	Stockport County	76	(6)
Total		129	(8)
- * Club domestic league appearances and goals

Thomas Hall (15 December 1876 – 1955) was an English footballer who played in the Football League for Glossop and Stockport County.
