= The Blue Seal =

- 2010 AOF theatrical film poster
- Directed by: Mike Donis
- Screenplay by: Marsha Courneya
- Produced by: George Zywiel; Mike Donis; Marsha Courneya; Aaron Tsang
- Starring: John Kraft; Thomas Daniel; Warren Bain; Alan A. Leyland
- Cinematography: Paul Carter
- Music by: Aaron Tsang
- Production company: Surface Cargo Productions
- Release date: July 28, 2010 (AOF Fest)
- Running time: 123 minutes
- Country: Canada
- Language: English

The Blue Seal is a 2010 Canadian action drama film directed by Mike Donis and starring John Kraft, Thomas Daniel, Warren Bain, and Alan A. Leyland. Set in the fictional rural town of Hontas, Ontario, Canada, it focuses on a socially awkward farmer, John Kraft, who is unwittingly a part of a criminal delivery organization. As he tries to break his ties with the delivery company, he degrades into a violent, evil person who must eventually find a way to return to his compassionate and good-natured self.

== Development ==
The Blue Seal was inspired by a short film which was shot as a part of a 48-Hour Toronto Film Challenge in June 2006. Inspired by the response to their short, Mike Donis, Aaron Tsang and Marsha Courneya decided to start writing a feature-length version, using the storyline of the short film as the introduction to the feature.

== Awards ==
The Blue Seal won runner up for two 2010 Action On Film International Film Festival awards. Breakout Male Action Star (John Kraft) and Best Action Sequence, and was nominated for Best Score (Aaron Tsang).
