= Thomas Baring (1799–1873) =

British banker and politician (1799–1873)

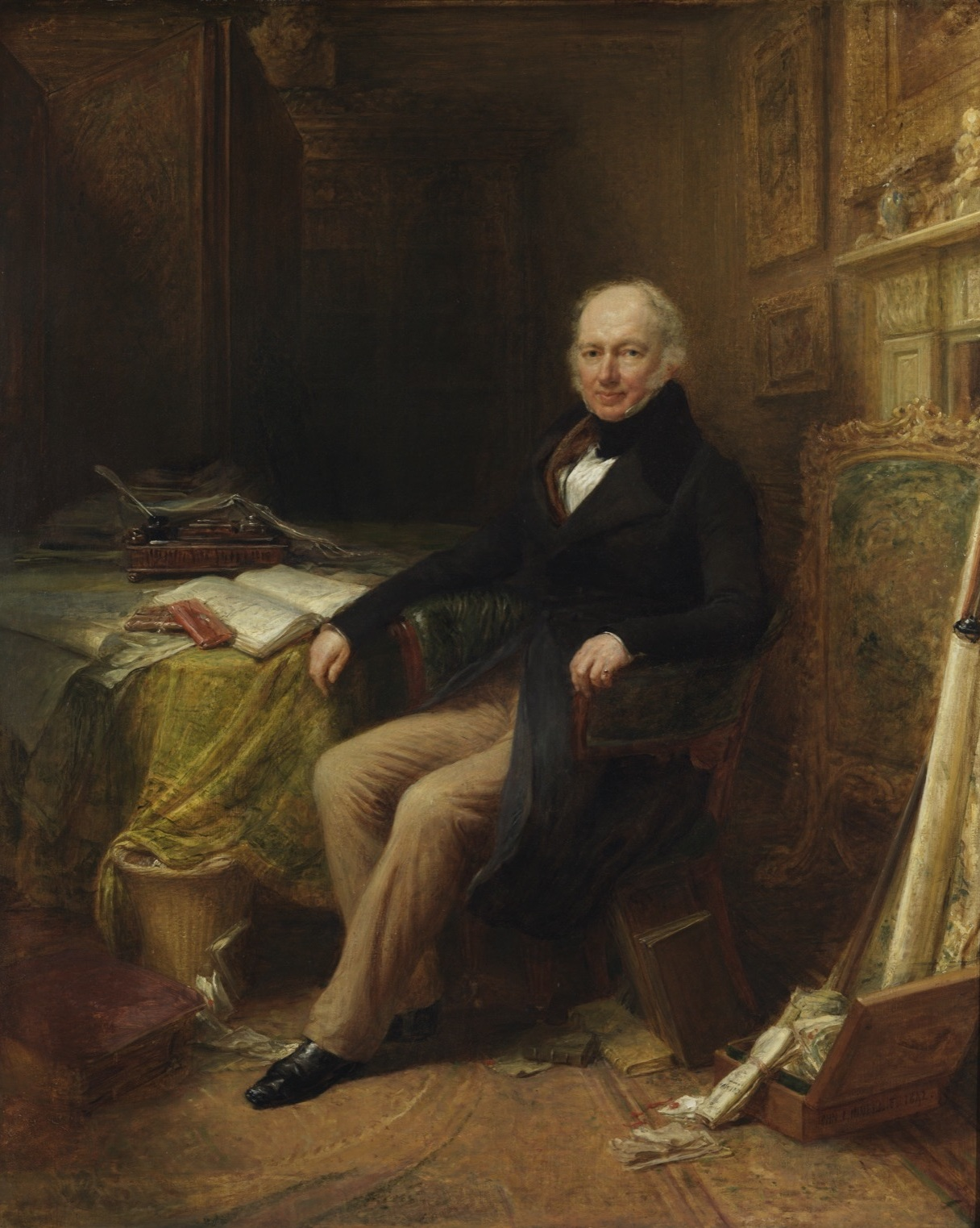
- Portrait by John Linnell, 1842

Member of Parliament for Great Yarmouth
- In office 1835–1837 Serving with Winthrop Mackworth Praed
- Preceded by: Charles Rumbold; George Anson
- Succeeded by: Charles Rumbold; William Wilshere

Member of Parliament for Huntingdon
- In office 1844–1873 Serving with Jonathan Peel (1844–1868)
- Preceded by: Jonathan Peel; Sir Frederick Pollock
- Succeeded by: Sir Jonathan Burgess Karslake

Personal details
- Born: 7 September 1799
- Died: 18 November 1873 (aged 74)
- Resting place: St. Mary the Virgin Churchyard, Micheldever, Hampshire, England
- Party: Conservative
- Parent: Sir Thomas Baring, 2nd Baronet (father)
- Relatives: Francis Baring, 1st Baron Northbrook (brother); Charles Baring (brother)

Thomas Baring (7 September 1799 – 18 November 1873) was a British banker and Conservative Party politician.

== Background and education ==
Baring was the second son of Sir Thomas Baring, 2nd Baronet, and Mary Ursula, daughter of Charles Sealy. Francis Baring, 1st Baron Northbrook, was his elder brother, and the Right Reverend Charles Baring one of his younger brothers. He was educated at Winchester.

== Business career ==
As a second son, Thomas was destined for a career in the "counting house". Beginning at Hope & Co., he did well in Amsterdam, becoming a partner in 1824. Despite the lobbying of Sir Thomas, the opposition of his uncle Alexander kept Thomas from a partnership in Baring Brothers & Co. until 1828. Once installed in London, Thomas sought, during the 1830s and 40s, to use knowledge and connections gained at Hopes to increase the firm's visibility in Europe. Except in Russia, Barings was mostly frustrated in these efforts by more established continental houses like Rothschilds and Hottinguer's.

During these same years Thomas, along with younger brother John, spent much time promoting Barings in North America, especially the United States. He made his first trip to the US in 1829 and many more thereafter. Following the death of all three senior Barings in 1848, Thomas and American Joshua Bates became the leading partners in the 1850s. The European troubles of 1848 also contributed to the shift of Barings' attention to the Americas. During this period, Barings was the financial agent for the governments of the US and (along with Glyn, Mills & Co.) Canada.

Entering the 1860s, with the ageing Bates becoming progressively less active, and with new young partner Edward 'Ned' Baring not ready for leadership, Thomas and Russell Sturgis (a second American) assumed command. Feeling the need for new blood at Barings, Thomas in 1867 completed a merger with London rival Finlay Hodgson and Co. Senior partner Kirkham Hodgson, a past Governor of the Bank of England, became a Barings partner. In the same year, Thomas' nephew Thomas Charles Baring also joined the partnership.

While always resistant to heavy involvement in public life, Thomas found time for other finance-related positions, including Chairman of Lloyd's and a director of the Bank of England. Like his father, he was President of the London Institution and a Fellow of the Royal Society

== Political career ==
Baring entered Parliament for Great Yarmouth in 1835, a seat he held until 1837, and later represented Huntingdon between 1844 and 1873. He was a close associate of Benjamin Disraeli but declined every ministerial post offered to him.

== Personal life ==
Baring died in November 1873, aged 74.

Parliament of the United Kingdom
Preceded by Charles Rumbold; Hon. George Anson	Member of Parliament for Great Yarmouth; 1835–1837; With: Winthrop Mackworth Praed	Succeeded by Charles Rumbold; William Wilshere
Preceded by Jonathan Peel; Sir Frederick Pollock	Member of Parliament for Huntingdon; 1844–1873; With: Jonathan Peel 1844–1868 (representation reduced to one member 1868)	Succeeded by Sir Jonathan Burgess Karslake
