= Tom Hall (Australian footballer) =

Australian rules footballer

Personal information
- Full name: Thomas Taylor Hall
- Born: 21 May 1921; Port Melbourne, Victoria
- Died: 28 January 2008 (aged 86)
- Height: 180 cm (5 ft 11 in)
- Weight: 71 kg (157 lb)

Playing career^{1}
| Years | Club | Games (Goals) |
| 1941 | South Melbourne | 2 (5) |
- ^{1} Playing statistics correct to the end of 1941.

Thomas Taylor Hall (21 May 1921 – 28 January 2008) was an Australian rules footballer who played with South Melbourne in the Victorian Football League (VFL).
