= William Luton =

William Luton (fl. 1352–1391), was an English Member of Parliament (MP).

He was a Member of the Parliament of England for Huntingdon in 1352, 1362, 1363, 1365, 1372, January 1377, October 1382, 1385, 1386 and 1391.
