= Thomas Daniel (MP) =

Thomas Daniel (fl. 1386–1390) of Huntingdon, was an English Member of Parliament (MP).

He was a Member of the Parliament of England for Huntingdon in 1386, February 1388, September 1388 and January 1390.
