= Tom Hall (electronic musician) =

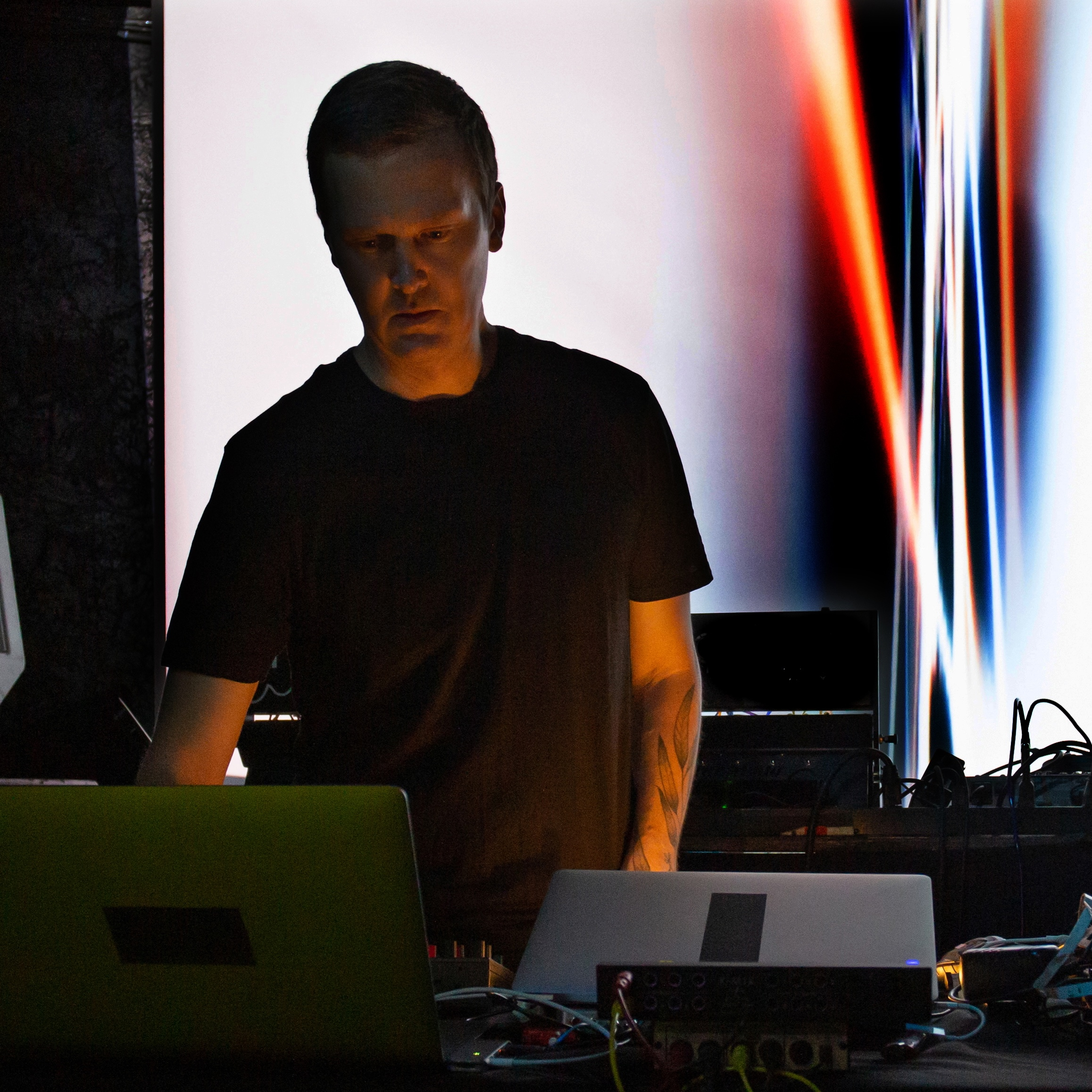
- Catch One, Los Angeles, 2019

Background information
- Born: 1980 or 1981 (age 44–45)
- Origin: Devonport, Tasmania, Australia
- Genres: Electronic music, glitch, ambient, electroacoustic, experimental, noise, drone, field recordings
- Occupations: Musician, artist, producer
- Instruments: Computer, Synthesizer, field recordings
- Years active: 2000–present
- Labels: Superpang, Errorgrid, Elli Records, Presto!?, hellosQuare, Overlap
- Website: www.tomhallsonics.com

Tom Hall is an Australian electronic audio-visual artist, who resides in Los Angeles, California.

Hall's work is characterized by field recordings, synthesizers, computer software processing, and improvisation, which generates a large range of possible sounds including; melodic rhythms, ambient textures, and drone.

Hall's eclectic works flourish by utilizing a variety of mediums, each that reflects his varied background and interests. With a strong focus on elements of the everyday Hall's practice involves explorations into place, space, and time. Drawing inspiration from countless 'peripheral' spaces, Hall focuses on using multiple approaches to engage and recontextualize them to the public.

Hall focuses on and uses sound as a means to translate feelings, create hybrid environments and notions of journey. Stylistically these outcomes vary from noise-orientated improvisation to structured drone, melody, and rhythm.

== Biography ==
Hall is a graduate of the Australian National University with Honours, where he majored in Photomedia, studying under the guidance of Dr. Martyn Jolly. During Hall's time at university, he spent one year abroad (2004) on a scholarship studying sound and moving image at Kyoto Seika University

He spent 5+ years in Brisbane where he collaborated with Lawrence English.

== Discography ==
- (2007) Fluere – Nightrider Records
- (2006) Floats – Sonoptik
- (2008) Cross – hellosQuare
- (2010) Past Present, Below – Overlap.org
- (2011) Distressed – Sonoptik
- (2011) Muted Angels – Complicated Dance Steps
- (2013) Many Days End – Sonoptik
- (2017) True Image – (Ltd Ed. cassette 50 LA Art Bookfair release)
- (2017) Fervor – Elli Records
- (2018) Spectra – Elli Records
- (2020) The Day After You Die – Sonoptik
- (2020) Bestowed Order On Chaos – Errorgrid
- (2021) Failed Attempts at Silence – Superpang
- (2025) Trip Computer – Sonoptik

=== Collaborations ===
- (2008) Euphonia w/ Lawrence English – Presto!?
