= Thomas Coote (English politician) =

Thomas Coote (1850 – 24 October 1939 at Hythe, Kent) was an English coal merchant and Liberal politician.

Coote was born at Fenstanton, Huntingdonshire, the son of Thomas Coote of St Ives, Huntingdonshire. He was educated privately and became a coal merchant in the firm of Coote & Son, Coal Merchants, of St Ives.

In the 1885 general election, Coote was elected Member of Parliament for Huntingdon but lost the seat in the 1886 general election. He had stood as the Liberal candidate in the Cambridgeshire by-election, 21 March 1884. He was a member of the Reform Club and an original member of the National Liberal Club.

Coote married in 1878, Elizabeth Pauline Day. They lived at Ambury House, Huntingdon.

Parliament of the United Kingdom
Preceded by Sir Robert Peel	Member of Parliament for Huntingdon; 1885 – 1886	Succeeded by Arthur Smith-Barry
