= Rokeby Collection =

Collection of photographs of UK railway stations

The Rokeby Collection is a collection by Reverend Hubert Denys Eddowes Rokeby of Thetford of photographs of railway stations in the UK before the 1960s. It is held in the Historic England Archive, in Swindon. The collection is extensive but not currently cataloged. It is arranged by parish.
