= Thomas Slade (MP) =

English politician (died 1580)

Thomas Slade (died 1580) of Huntingdon was an English lawyer and politician. He was of counsel to the borough of Huntingdon and sat as its member of the Parliament of England in 1572, but died before the Parliament's third session.

== Career ==
Slade was admitted to the Middle Temple in 1558 and was called to the bar by 1567. Like his father, from whom he inherited land in five Huntingdonshire parishes, he practised the law; his chamber at the Temple looked out on Temple Lane. In 1576 he contributed to the reader's feast, but in the following year was fined for not attending "the cupboard" to assist the reader, a duty required of senior barristers, and was soon afterwards fined £5, possibly for declining to read himself.

He was of counsel to Huntingdon by 1572 and a justice of the peace for Huntingdonshire from about 1573. Since he already advised the borough on legal matters, he was a natural choice for Huntingdon to return to Parliament, and he attended the election himself. Nothing is recorded of his part in the first two sessions of the Parliament of 1572, and he died before the third met; administration of his estate was granted in 1580.

== Family ==
Slade was the eldest son of Richard Slade of Huntingdon by Elizabeth, daughter of John Spencer of Bedfordshire, and succeeded his father in 1557. He married Clayes Bellikin Clampe, who may have been a daughter of Philip Clampe (died 1559) of Huntingdon and Brampton, Huntingdonshire; they had two daughters.
