= List of long poems in English =

This is a list of English poems over 1000 lines. This list includes poems that are generally identified as part of the long poem genre, being considerable in length, and with that length enhancing the poems' meaning or thematic weight. This alphabetical list is incomplete, as the label of long poem is selectively and inconsistently applied in literary academia.

Poet	Poem	Year published	Length	Verse form
Algerton, Frank C.	Columbia: an Epic Poem on the Late Civil War between the Northern and Southern States of North America	1893		heroic couplet
Ammons, A. R.	Sphere: The Form of a Motion	1973		
Ammons, A. R.	Tape for the Turn of the Year	1965		
Ashbery, John	Flow Chart	1991	4,794 lines	
Atherstone, Edwin	The Fall of Nineveh	1828–1868		blank verse
Atherstone, Edwin	Israel in Egypt	1861	c. 20,000	blank verse
Auden, W.H.	The Age of Anxiety	1944–46	c. 2,500	
Aurobindo, Sri	Savitri: A Legend and a Symbol	1951	c. 24,000 lines	blank verse
Anonymous	Beowulf	8th–11th century	3,182 lines	alliterative verse
Benét, Stephen Vincent	John Brown's Body	1930	c. 15,000 lines	various
Blackmore, Richard	Eliza	1705	c. 8,000 lines	heroic couplet
Blackmore, Richard	Redemption	1722		
Bowles, William Lisle	The Spirit of Discovery; or, the Conquest of Ocean	1804		blank verse
Branch, Anna Hempstead	Nimrod	1910		blank verse
Browning, Elizabeth Barrett	Aurora Leigh	1856	10,938 lines	blank verse
Browning, Robert	Sordello	1840		heroic couplet
Browning, Robert	The Ring and the Book	1868–69	c. 21,000 lines	blank verse
Browning, Robert	Fifine at the Fair	1872	2,530 lines	alexandrine couplets
Bryant, John Delavau	Redemption, a Poem	1857		blank verse
Bulmer, Agnes	Messiah's Kingdom	1833	c. 14,000 lines	heroic couplet
Byron, Lord	Don Juan	1824	15,920 lines	ottava rima
Byron, Lord	Childe Harold's Pilgrimage	1812–18	4,455 lines	Spenserian stanza
Chaucer, Geoffrey	Troilus and Criseyde	c. 1380	8,239 lines	rhyme royal
Clough, Arthur Hugh	The Bothie of Tober-na-Vuolich	1848	c. 1,870	hexameter
Cowper, William	The Task	1785		blank verse
Crane, Hart	The Bridge	1930		
Anonymous	Cursor Mundi	c. 1300	c. 30,000 lines, depending on manuscript	primarily eight-syllable couplets
H.D.	Helen in Egypt	1961		
H.D.	Trilogy	1944–46		
Davenant, William	Gondibert	1651	6,940 lines	decasyllabic quatrains
Dickey, James	The Zodiac	1976		
Dorn, Edward	Gunslinger	1989		
Drayton, Michael	The Barons' Wars	1603	3,624 lines	ottava rima
Drayton, Michael	Poly-Olbion	1612; 1622	15,000 lines	alexandrine
Drummond, William Hamilton	The Battle of Trafalgar	1806		heroic couplet
Dryden, John	The Hind and the Panther	1687	2,569 lines	heroic couplet
Duncan, Robert	The Structure of Rime	1960		
Duncan, Robert	Passages	1968		
Emerson, Claudia	Pinion	2002		
Fitchett, John	King Alfred	1841	c. 131,000 lines	blank verse
Gawain Poet	Cleanness	late 14th century	1,813 lines	alliterative verse
Gawain Poet	Pearl	late 14th century	1212 lines	alliterative verse
Gawain Poet	Sir Gawain and the Green Knight	late 14th century	2,530 lines	alliterative verse
Anonymous	Generides	late 14th century	6696 lines	rhyme royal
Glover, Richard	Leonidas	1737		blank verse
Gower, John	Confessio Amantis	c. 1390	33,000 lines	rhymed couplets
Greening, John	Fotheringhay	1995		
Greening, John	Gascoigne's Egg	2000		
Greening, John	Omm Sety	2001		
Greening, John	The Silence	2019		
Thomas Hoccleve	Regiment of Princes	1410–1413	5,464 lines	Seven-line decasyllabic rhymed stanzas
Howe, Susan	The Liberties	1980		
Hughes, Langston	Montage of a Dream Deferred	1951		
Jones, David	The Anathemata	1952		
Jones, David	In Parenthesis	1937		
Kaye, John Brayshaw	Trial of Christ in Seven Stages	1909		blank verse
Kaye, John Brayshaw	Vashti	1894		blank verse
Keats, John	Endymion	1818	c. 4,100	heroic couplet
Anonymous	King Alisaunder	c. 1300	4,000 lines	octosyllabic couplets
Anonymous	King Horn	c. 1225	1,650 lines	rhyming couplets with occasional alliterative metre
Langland, William	Piers Plowman	c. 1370–90	c. 7,300 lines	alliterative metre
Anonymous	Laud Troy Book	c. 1400	18,664 lines	tetrameter couplets
Lawrance, William Vicars	The Story of Judeth	1889		heroic couplet
Layamon	Brut	c. 1190–1215	c. 16,095 lines	alliterative verse with rhyme
Lydgate, John	The Fall of the Princes	1431–1439	36,365 lines	rhyme royal
Lydgate, John	Siege of Thebes	1420–1422	4,716 lines	rhyme royal
Lydgate, John	Troy Book	1412–20	30,117 lines	ten-syllable couplets
Longfellow, Henry Wadsworth	Evangeline	1847	1396 lines	hexameter
Longfellow, Henry Wadsworth	The Song of Hiawatha	1855	5,414 lines	octosyllable
Robert Mannyng	Handlyng Synne	c. 1303	c. 12,000 lines	four-stress rhyme royal
Masefield, John	Dauber	1912		rhyme royal
Meek, Alexander Beaufort	The Red Eagle. A Poem of the South	1855		
Melville, Herman	Clarel	1876	18,000 lines	irregularly rhymed iambic tetrameter
Merrill, James	The Changing Light at Sandover	1976–82	17,000 lines	various
Miles, Sibella Elizabeth	The Wanderer of Scandinavia, or Sweden Delivered	1826		Spenserian stanza
Milton, John	Paradise Lost	1667	10,565 lines	blank verse
Milton, John	Paradise Regained	1671	2,070 lines	blank verse
Milton, John	Samson Agonistes	1671	1,758 lines	blank verse
Moon, George Washington	Elijah the Prophet	1866		blank verse
Morris, William	The Earthly Paradise	1868–1870		various
Morris, William	The Story of Sigurd the Volsung and the Fall of the Niblungs	1876	10,000+ lines	alliterative verse
Ogilvie, John	Britannia	1801		blank verse
Olson, Charles	Maximus Poems	1953–1975		
Orrm	Ormulum	1150–1180	18,956 lines	unrhymed strict heptameter
Peterson, Joseph G.	Inside the Whale	2011		
Petrucci, Mario	i tulips	2010/2013/2014 (excerpts)	Anglo-American modernist sequence of 1111 poems (coda = exactly 1111 lines); many tens of thousands of lines (est.)	mainly concrete tercets, rich imagery, closely-woven sonic patterns
Pound, Ezra	Cantos	1915–62		free verse
Anonymous	Prick of Conscience	c. 1325–1350	c. 9,600 lines	octosyllabic couplets
Robinson, Edwin Arlington	Merlin	1917	c. 2,560 lines	blank verse
Seymer, John Gunning	The Fall of Saul	1839		blank verse
Shakespeare, William	The Rape of Lucrece	1594	1,855 lines	rhyme royal
Shelley, Percy Bysshe	Queen Mab	1813	2,289 lines	
Shelley, Percy Bysshe	The Revolt of Islam	1817	4,818 lines	Spenserian stanza
Southey, Robert	Joan of Arc	1796		
Southey, Robert	Thalaba the Destroyer	1801		
Southey, Robert	Madoc	1805		
Southey, Robert	Roderick the Last of the Goths	1814		
Spenser, Edmund	The Faerie Queene	1590, 1596	34,928 lines	Spenserian stanza
Stanford, Frank	The Battlefield Where the Moon Says I Love You	1977	15,283 lines	
Stein, Gertrude	Stanzas in Meditation	1956		
Swinburne, Algernon Charles	Tristram of Lyonesse	1882	4,488 lines	heroic couplet
Thomson, James	The Castle of Indolence	1748	1,422 lines	Spenserian stanza
Thomson, James	The Seasons	1730	5,405 lines	blank verse
Tighe, Mary	Psyche, or the Legend of Love	1805	3,348 lines	Spenserian stanza
Tolkien, J. R. R.	The Lay of Leithian	1985	4,223 lines	rhyming couplets
Tolkien, J. R. R.	The Lay of the Children of Húrin	1985	2,276 lines	alliterative verse
Tolson, Melvin B.	Harlem Gallery	1965		
Townsend, George	Armageddon	1815		blank verse
Walcott, Derek	Omeros	1990	c. 8,000	terza rima, free verse
Warren, Robert Penn	Brother to Dragons: A Tale in Verse and Voices	1953		blank verse, closet drama
Whitman, Walt	Song of Myself	1881	1346 lines	free verse
Williams, Saul	, said the shotgun to the head	2006		
Williams, William Carlos	Paterson	1946–58		
Wordsworth, William	The Prelude	1850		blank verse
Zukofsky, Louis	"A"	1928–78		free verse
