= Copperwheat =

Copperwheat is a surname of English origin. Notable people with the surname include:

- Ben Copperwheat British print designer/artist living and working in New York City
- Dennis Copperwheat (1914–92), British Navy sailor who won the George Cross for heroism displayed during the defence of Malta in 1942
- Hallie Copperwheat (active from 2015), English artistic gymnast; see 2015 in artistic gymnastics
- Mark Copperwheat, English curler who took part in the 1998 World Junior Curling Championships and the 1999 European Curling Championships
- Winifred Copperwheat (1905–76), English viola player and teacher

== See also ==
- Copperwheat, a seasonal beer produced (in June) by Harveys Brewery, East Sussex, England
- Copperwheat Blundell, fashion designer
