= Kimbolton School =

Private school in Cambridgeshire, England

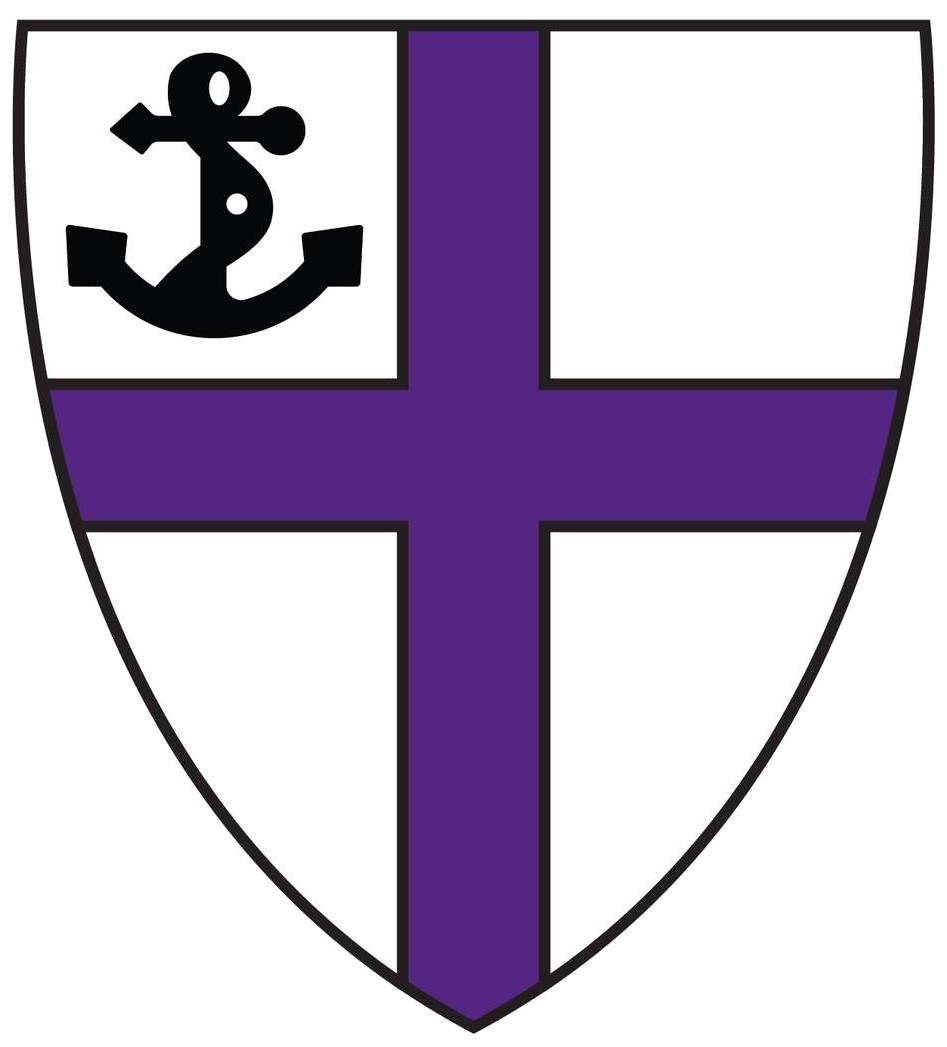

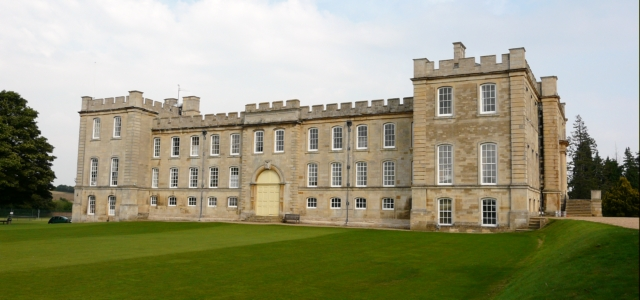

Location
- Kimbolton, Cambridgeshire, PE28 0EA; England; 52.295685°N 0.387359°W

Information
- Other name: Kimbolton
- Type: Private school
- Motto: Spes Durat Avorum (Latin: "May the hopes of our forefathers endure")
- Religious affiliation: Inter-denominational
- Established: 1600; 426 years ago (Earliest references from 1531)
- Founders: Henry Balye and William Dawson
- Department for Education URN: 110925 Tables
- Headmaster: Will Chuter
- Gender: Coeducational
- Age: 4 to 18
- Enrollment: 1082 (2024)
- Capacity: 1100
- Houses: Four in the Preparatory School, five in the Senior School
- Colours: Purple, black and white
- Song: (historically) All My Hope on God is Founded (unofficially) Jerusalem
- Publication: The Kimboltonian
- Former pupils: Old Kimboltonians
- Website: kimbolton.cambs.sch.uk

Kimbolton School is a British HMC co-educational private day and boarding school in the village of Kimbolton, Cambridgeshire, England.

There are 1,000 students, aged 4 to 18. Boarding and flexi-boarding is available to a limited number of students from the age of 11. There are approximately 700 students in the Senior School, and 300 in the Preparatory School.

Since 1950, the school has occupied Kimbolton Castle (the former seat of the Dukes of Manchester) and its grounds.

== History ==
The school is the successor to the village grammar school and although there are references to a school at Kimbolton as early as 1531, the generally accepted date for its foundation is 1600. It originally occupied buildings within the churchyard, but moved to new premises in Tilbrook Road in the late 19th century. In 1949 its named was changed from Kimbolton Grammar School to Kimbolton School, and the following year it bought Kimbolton Castle from the Duke of Manchester.

The Senior School is based in the grounds of the Castle, while the Preparatory School is based at the other end of the village and connected to the senior school by 'The Duchess Walk', a tree-lined avenue. The school grounds total over 120 acres (49 ha).

The school's Latin motto is: "Spes Durat Avorum" (Let the hope of our forefathers endure).

== Campus ==
Kimbolton School's campus is currently situated upon Kimbolton Castle grounds. This land is in conjunction with some other areas of land owned by the school prior to the purchase of the castle in 1950. The school's total campus area comes to ~105 acres. In addition to the castle, the school campus also includes the Queen Katherine Building, opened in 2011, to a total development cost of £10.6m

=== The Castle ===
The Castle was bought by Henry Montagu, 1st Earl of Manchester, in 1615. His descendants owned the castle until it was sold in 1950.

Charles Edward Montagu, the 4th Earl, who was created 1st Duke of Manchester in 1719, had reconstruction works carried out between 1690 and 1720. Sir John Vanbrugh and his assistant Nicholas Hawksmoor redesigned the facades of the Castle in a classical style, but with battlements to evoke its history as a castle, the portico was later added by Alessandro Galilei. The Venetian painter Giovanni Antonio Pellegrini redecorated some of the reconstructed rooms in 1708. These rooms included the main staircase, now called the Pellegrini Staircase, and the chapel. Gilded furnishings in a Louis XIV-inspired style by French upholsterers working in London were also commissioned.

For a later Duke, Robert Adam produced plans for the Castle Gatehouse and other garden buildings, including an orangery. Only one of these buildings, the gatehouse, was constructed, in around 1764. Mews buildings were added to provide stables, and an avenue of giant sequoias was planted in the 19th century.

The Castle was used by the Royal Army Medical Corps during World War II, and the 10th Duke of Manchester sold the Castle to the school in 1950. The furnishings were scattered in sales and some have come to national collections. There is limited public opening during the school holidays and at weekends.

The Castle is mostly used for 6th form and Spanish teaching and also houses staff areas as well as the 6th form common-room.

Most teaching and other activities take place in other buildings, on the school grounds.

=== Boarding ===
The boarding houses are situated on Kimbolton High Street. The boys' boarding house, called Kimbolton House, is by the top of the High Street, while the girls' house, White House, is at the bottom, opposite the Church of England parish church.

== Notable former pupils ==
- Louise Brealey, actress, writer and journalist
- Charles C. W. Cooke, journalist and broadcaster
- Lieutenant Dennis Arthur Copperwheat George Cross recipient
- Christopher Curry, founder of Acorn Computers
- George Furbank, Northampton Saints and England rugby player
- William Giles, Colonial Manager of the South Australian Company (1840–1861)
- Prof. Jonathan Kydd, agricultural economist
- Lord Lancaster of Kimbolton, Conservative peer and former Member of Parliament
- Raymond Lewin, George Cross recipient
- Clive Mantle, actor
- Ben Saxton, sailor and Team GB Olympian at 2016 Summer Games
- Simon Thurley, historian, archaeologist, Chief Executive of English Heritage (2002–2015)
- Martin Yates, conductor
- John Whitworth (1921–2013), countertenor, organist, and professor at the Guildhall School of Music

== Notable staff ==
- Peter Jones, BBC Sport radio commentator and master at the school
- John Greening (poet) (teacher of English, 1983–2014), poet and critic
- Ronald Lancaster MBE (staff 1963–88), an Anglican clergyman, was Chemistry master and School Chaplain, and founded Kimbolton Fireworks in 1964
- Howard Payne, Olympic and Commonwealth Games athlete Commonwealth Gold Medallist (hammer) 1962, 1966, 1970
- Henry Peacham, a writer, was an assistant master at the school in the early 17th century
- Waldo Williams, leading Welsh language poet and master at the school.
- Edward Maria Wingfield, English colonist of America, later Governor of the school

== Sources ==
- ISBI page for Kimbolton School
- ISI report for Kimbolton School (2005 inspection)
- DFES page
- Stratford, John (2000), From Churchyard to Castle, Kimbolton School, ISBN 0-9537753-0-5
