= Träd fram du nattens gud =

Song with 18th century Swedish bard Carl Michael Bellman

"Träd fram du Nattens Gud"
- Art song
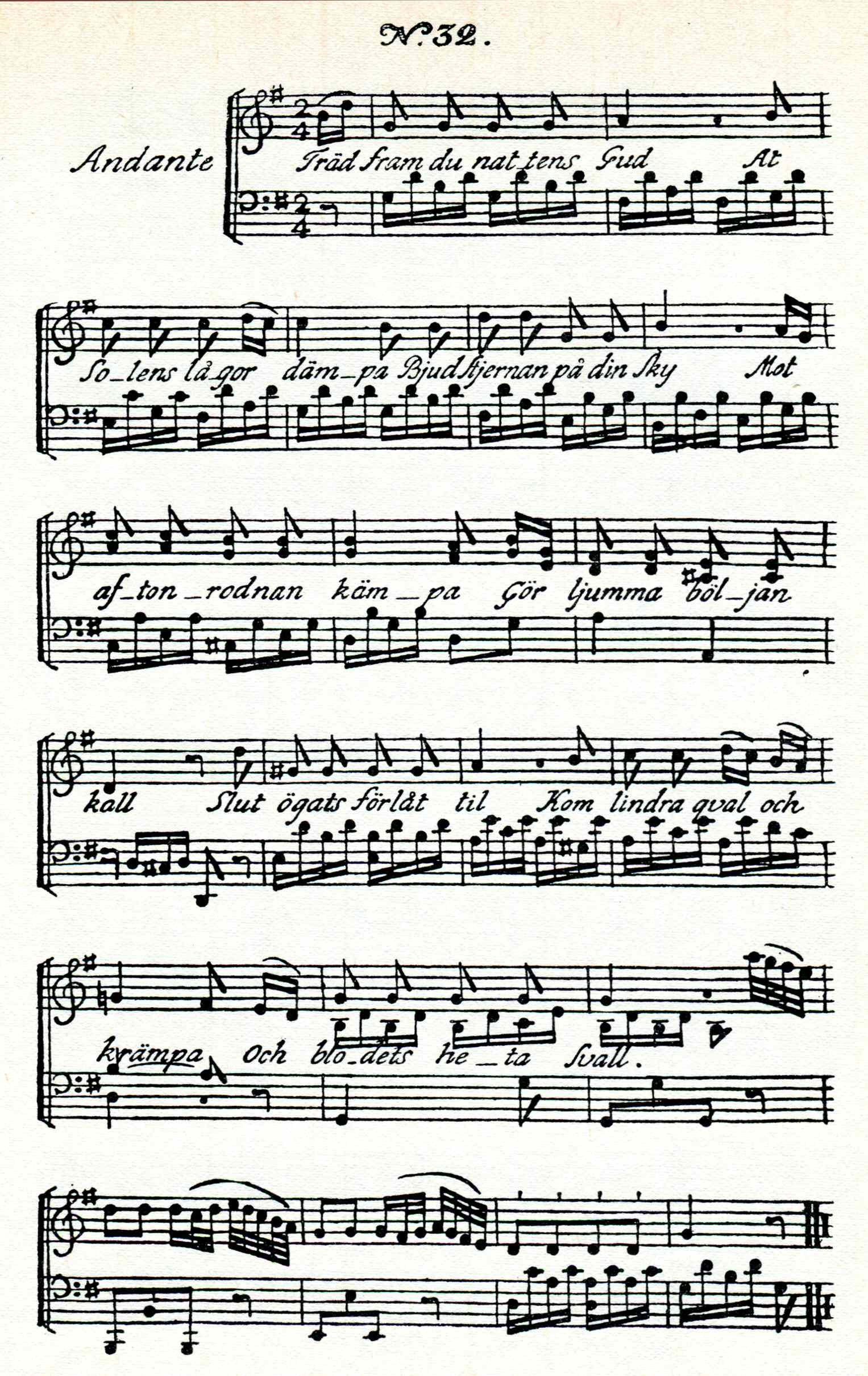
- First page of sheet music
- English: Step forth, thou god of night
- Written: 1780, reworked 1784
- Text: poem by Carl Michael Bellman
- Language: Swedish
- Melody: Unknown source, possibly Bellman's own
- Dedication: Fru assessorskan Weltzin
- Published: 1791 in Fredman's Songs
- Scoring: voice and cittern

"Träd fram du nattens gud" (Step forth, thou god of night), "Aftonkväde" (Song at Nightfall), or Fredmans sånger no. 32 is a nature-lyrical Swedish song by Carl Michael Bellman, a nocturne in the style of Edward Young's Night-Thoughts.

The song depicts gods and other mythological beings, and a summer night after a long drought. In the night landscape are peace and rest, but also threatening creatures, both natural, like snakes and martens, and supernatural. Nature is strongly mythologised; night falls because a god commands it, bringing sleep to the mythical beings. The song ends with an announcement that the narrator is falling asleep.

== Context ==
Carl Michael Bellman is a central figure in the Swedish ballad tradition and a powerful influence in Swedish music, known for his 1790 Fredman's Epistles and his 1791 Fredman's Songs. A solo entertainer, he played the cittern, accompanying himself as he performed his songs at the royal court.

Jean Fredman (1712 or 1713–1767) was a real watchmaker of Bellman's Stockholm. The fictional Fredman, alive after 1767, but without employment, is the supposed narrator in Bellman's epistles and songs. The epistles, written and performed in different styles, from drinking songs and laments to pastorales, paint a complex picture of the life of the city during the 18th century. A frequent theme is the demimonde, with Fredman's cheerfully drunk Order of Bacchus, a loose company of ragged men who favour strong drink and prostitutes. At the same time as depicting this realist side of life, Bellman creates a rococo picture, full of classical allusion, following the French post-Baroque poets. The women, including the beautiful Ulla Winblad, are "nymphs", while Neptune's festive troop of followers and sea-creatures sport in Stockholm's waters. The juxtaposition of elegant and low life is humorous, sometimes burlesque, but always graceful and sympathetic. The songs are "most ingeniously" set to their music, which is nearly always borrowed and skilfully adapted.

== Song ==
=== Music and verse form ===
Melody of Fredman's Song 32

The song is in 2/4 time and is marked Andante. No source has been found for the elegant and neat melody, implying it may be Bellman's own composition; the metre is certainly Bellman's. Each stanza is of five lines, consisting of two alexandrines, a hemistich (half-length line), an alexandrine, and a final hemistich; the rhyming scheme follows the same pattern, AABAB.

=== Lyrics ===
"Aftonkväde" is included among Bellman's 1791 Fredman's songs as number 32; its first version was written in 1780, but it was reworked in 1784 prior to printing. From being a classicist depiction of an animated archaic landscape peopled by ancient gods, it contains more realistic details in the spirit of James Thomson. The verse size is similar to that used by Johan Gabriel Oxenstierna in his poem Natten (Night). The poem first appeared in Bellman's 1780 En stuf rim, a collection of his earliest poems with some new compositions, like this one, imitating Oxenstierna, who in turn was following Edward Young's popular Night-Thoughts, published 1742–1745. The poem has been translated by Paul Britten Austin.

Versions
Aftonkväde, 1791
Carl Michael Bellman

Ditt täcke gömmer allt... Betraktom Floras gårdar!
Här skönsta höjder fly, där mörka griftevårdar
på svarta kullar stå;
och under uvars gråt mullvadar, ormar, mårdar
ur sina kamrar gå.

Evening Song
Prose translation

Your quilt covers everything... Look at Flora's gardens!
Here the most beautiful heights flee, there dark barrow-wights
stand on black hills;
and under owls' crying moles, snakes, and martens
leave their chambers.

Song at Nightfall, 1967
Paul Britten Austin

All hid beneath thy cape, see Flora's gardens slumber;
Lo, fairest summits flee and ancient barrows sombre
On sable hillocks low!
Where weeps the hungry owl, moles, serpents without number
From out their chambers go.

Works imitated
Night-Thoughts 1742–1745
Edward Young

Night, sable goddess! from her ebon throne,
In rayless majesty, now stretches forth
Her leaden sceptre o'er a slumbering world.
Silence, how dead! and darkness, how profound!
Nor eye, nor listening ear, an object finds;
Creation sleeps.

Natten, 1770
Johan Gabriel Oxenstierna

Den vind, som smyger hit, bland täta löf försvinner:
Här Sömnens trötta Gud en älskad hvila finner,
Bland Vallmog och Cypress, som kring hans hjessa gro.
Här retas ingen våg; här löfven aldrig bäfva;
Fast drömmar spridas här och kring hans läger sväfva,
De störa ej hans ro.

Night
Prose translation

The wind that creeps here, among dense leaves disappears:
Here the weary God of Sleep finds a beloved rest,
Among Poppies and Cypress, which sprout around his head.
No wave is teased here; here the leaves never tremble;
Though dreams spread here and around his camp hover,
They do not disturb his peace.

=== Analysis ===
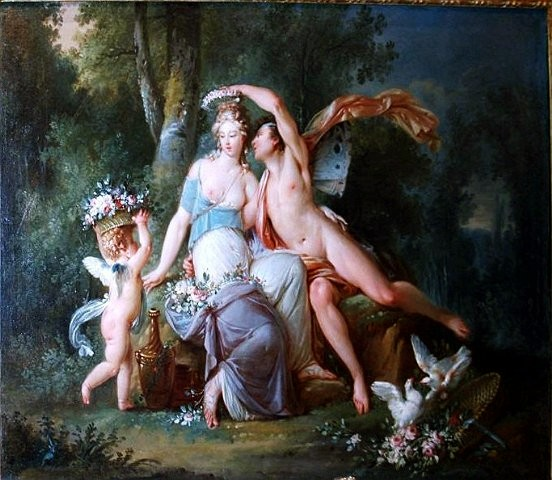
Classical mythology in a natural setting: "Zephyr Crowning Flora". Painting by Jean-Frédéric Schall (1752–1825)

In terms of content, the poem combines a poetic integration of gods and other mythological beings, with a realistic, though idealized, depiction of a summer night after a long period of drought. Technically, it resembles several of Fredman's epistles, since the poet commands "the god of the night" to transform day to night and bring coolness to the world and the minds of the people, which are thus linked together. The nightly landscape, however, offers not only peace and rest, but threatening creatures - initially "moles, snakes, and martens", then cyclopes, fauns and supernatural guests, who, however, are asked by the shepherd Alexis to lie down to rest. After he has similarly quieted the powers of the wind and the water, the poem's last stanza shows a typical ambiguity for Bellman, when Arachne (a Greek nymph, her name meaning "Spider") is asked to trap Alexis's needle: is it a question of the myth or a poetic rewriting for the spider, related to the serpents and the martens? Regardless, the poem ends with another typical scene, with the announcement that the narrator is about to fall asleep, which certainly was meant to be depicted at the performance.

The suggestion that the poem depicts the farm Sågtorp at Erstavik, based on its dedication to the assessor Weltzin, who had this farm as a summer residence, is doubtful.

Carina Burman writes in her biography of Bellman that the song's fifteen stanzas describe how night falls. In a strongly mythologised Nature, night does not fall because of the laws of physics but because a god commands it, as acknowledged in the line "Your quilt covers everything". This applies on the large scale and the small: the lake cools, as does people's blood. Both humans and Nature's mythical beings – "cyclopes, fauns" – are made to be quiet: "Apollo himself is playing". The god's performance brings sleep to the mythical beings, and the poet himself ends the song by going to sleep: "But now – now I shall sleep". Burman comments that the poet's sleep brings the whole world to rest, as no-one is left to portray it in song.

== Sources ==
- Bellman, Carl Michael (1790). Fredmans epistlar. Stockholm: By Royal Privilege.
- Britten Austin, Paul (1967). The Life and Songs of Carl Michael Bellman: Genius of the Swedish Rococo. New York: Allhem, Malmö American-Scandinavian Foundation. ISBN 978-3-932759-00-0.
- Burman, Carina (2019). Bellman. Biografin [Bellman: The Biography] (in Swedish). Stockholm: Albert Bonniers Förlag. ISBN 978-9100141790.
- Hassler, Göran; Dahl, Peter (illus.) (1989). Bellman – en antologi [Bellman – an anthology]. En bok för alla. ISBN 91-7448-742-6.
- Kleveland, Åse; Ehrén, Svenolov (illus.) (1984). Fredmans epistlar & sånger [The songs and epistles of Fredman]. Stockholm: Informationsförlaget. ISBN 91-7736-059-1. (with facsimiles of sheet music from first editions in 1790, 1791)
- Lönnroth, Lars (2005). Ljuva karneval!: om Carl Michael Bellmans diktning. Stockholm: Bonnier. ISBN 91-0-057245-4.
