= Night-Thoughts =

1742–1745 long poem by Edward Young

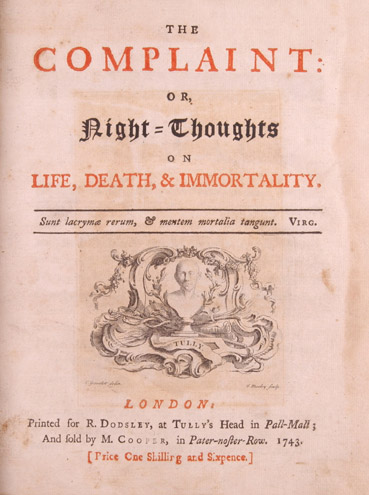

A page from Night-Thoughts, illustrated by William Blake

The Complaint: or, Night-Thoughts on Life, Death, & Immortality, better known simply as Night-Thoughts, is a long poem by the English poet Edward Young, published in nine parts (or "nights") between 1742 and 1745. It was illustrated with notable engravings by William Blake.

The poem records Young's musings on death as he ponders the loss of his wife and friends, and as he laments human frailties. A famous line points out how quickly life and opportunities can slip away. The individual poems in the series are dedicated to several contemporaries of Young, including Arthur Onslow, Spencer Compton, 1st Earl of Wilmington, Margaret Bentinck, Duchess of Portland, Philip Yorke, 1st Earl of Hardwicke, George Lee, 2nd Earl of Lichfield, Henry Pelham, and Thomas Pelham-Holles, 1st Duke of Newcastle.

== Style and content ==
The poem is written in blank verse. It describes the poet's musings on death over a series of nine "nights" in which he ponders the loss of his wife and friends, and laments human frailties. The best-known line in the poem (at the end of "Night I") is the adage "procrastination is the thief of time", which is part of a passage in which the poet discusses how quickly life and opportunities can slip away. Night-Thoughts had a very high reputation for many years after its publication, but is now best known for a major series of illustrations by William Blake in 1797. A lesser-known set of illustrations was created by Thomas Stothard in 1799.

The nine nights are each a poem of their own. They are: "Life, Death, and Immortality" (dedicated to Arthur Onslow); "Time, Death, Friendship" (dedicated to Spencer Compton); "Narcissa" (dedicated to Margaret Bentinck); "The Christian Triumph" (dedicated to Philip Yorke); "The Relapse" (dedicated to George Lee); "The Infidel Reclaim'd" (in two parts, "Glories and Riches" and "The Nature, Proof, and Importance of Immortality"; dedicated to Henry Pelham); "Virtue's Apology; or, The Man of the World Answered" (with no dedication); and "The Consolation" (dedicated to Thomas Pelham-Holles).

In his 1791 book, Life of Samuel Johnson, James Boswell called Night-Thoughts "the grandest and richest poetry that human genius has ever produced".

== Blake's illustrations of 1795–1797 ==
William Blake was commissioned in 1795 to illustrate Night-Thoughts for a major new edition of the poem to be published by Richard Edwards. Blake began by making a series of 537 watercolour illustrations from which he planned to engrave about 200 for publication. The first volume – with forty-three engravings by Blake – was published in 1797, but it was a commercial failure and the expensive publishing venture was abandoned.

Because the principal evidence of Blake's work on these illustrations was the comparatively short series of engravings, art history has been slow to recognise the significance of the project within Blake's œuvre. In 1980, the Oxford University Press began publication of a projected five-volume scholarly edition of Blake's version of Night-Thoughts, edited by J. E. Grant et al.; two volumes have so far appeared and the fifth has apparently been abandoned. In 2005, the Folio Society published in two volumes a fine edition facsimile accompanied by a commentary by Robyn Hamlyn. The Folio Society facsimile was the first (and thus far only) time that all 537 of Blake's illustrations have been published together in full colour.

== Adaptations and translations ==
Solomon Pappenheim adapted Night Thoughts into Hebrew with intonations for the Four cups of wine drunk on the Passover Seder (and generally on the themes of Salvation) with the title Agadat Arbaʻ kosot (first printed in Berlin, 1790)

== See also ==
- Träd fram du Nattens Gud, a poem by Carl Michael Bellman, inspired by Night-Thoughts
