= Lönnroth =

Lönnroth is a surname. Notable people with the surname include:

- Erik Lönnroth (1910–2002), Swedish historian
- Erik Johannes Lönnroth (1883–1971), Finnish forester
- Hjalmar Lönnroth (1856–1935), Swedish sailor
- Johan Lönnroth (born 1937), Swedish politician and economist
- Lars Lönnroth (born 1935), Swedish literary scholar
