= John Greening (poet) =

English poet, critic, playwright, and teacher (born 1955)

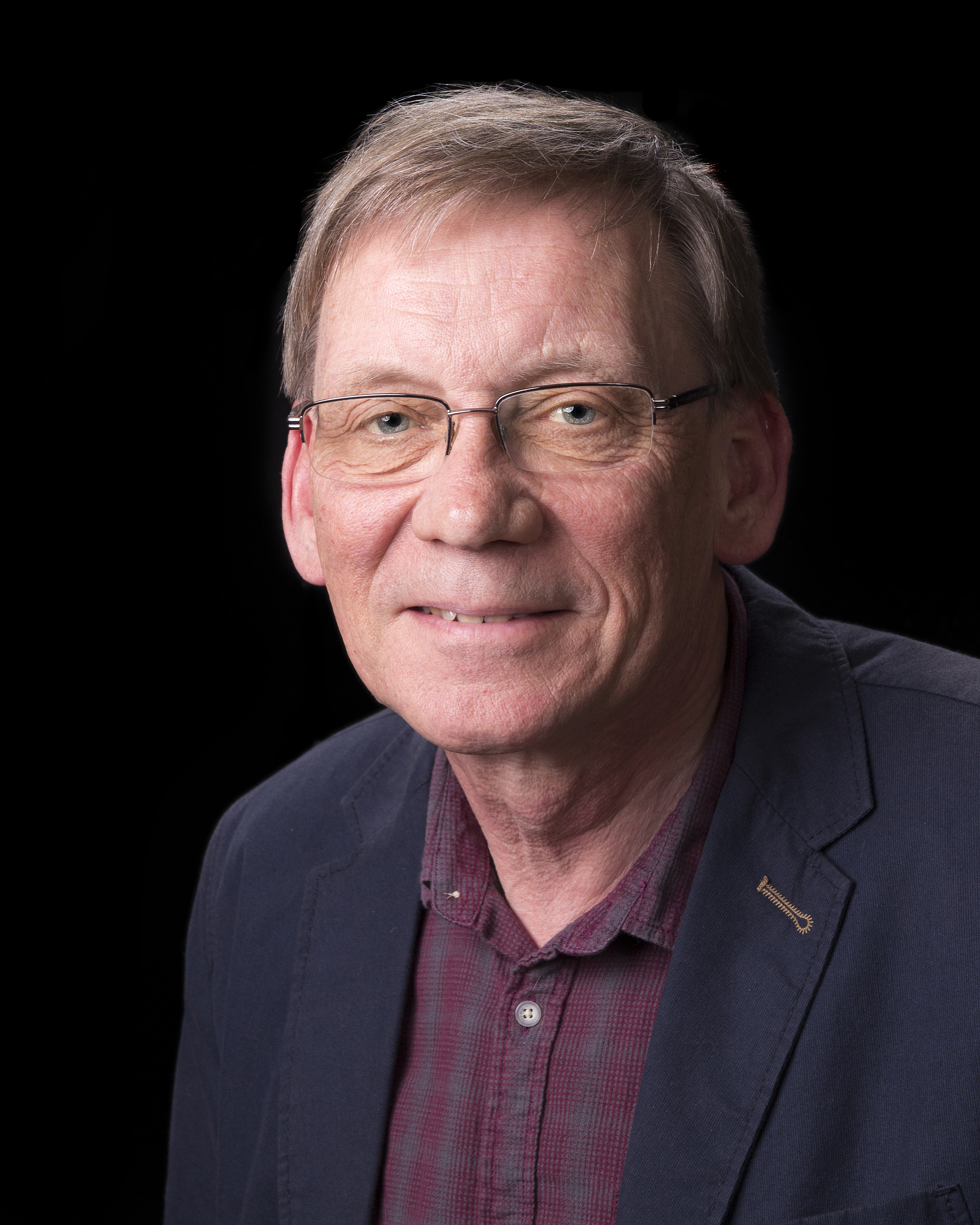
- John Greening
- Born: 20 March 1954 (age 72); Chiswick, England
- Education: Swansea University
- Occupations: Poet, editor, critic
- Writing career
- Period: 1976 – present

John Greening (born 20 March 1954 in Chiswick, London) is an English poet, critic, playwright and teacher. He has published more than twenty poetry collections large and small, including To the War Poets (2013) and The Silence (2019), both from Carcanet Press, and The Interpretation of Owls: Selected Poems, 1977–2022 (2023), from Baylor University Press. He has edited a major illustrated edition of Edmund Blunden's war memoir, Undertones of War, for Oxford University Press and produced editions of poetry by Geoffrey Grigson and Iain Crichton Smith. His anthologies include Accompanied Voices: Poets on Composers from Thomas Tallis to Arvo Pärt (Boydell and Brewer, 2015), Hollow Palaces: An Anthology of Modern Country House Poems (Liverpool University Press, 2021), and Contraflow: Lines of Englishness, 1922–2022 (Renard Press, 2023), the latter two co-edited with Kevin Gardner. He has reviewed poetry for the Times Literary Supplement since the 1990s. His collected reviews and essays, Vapour Trails (Shoestring Press), appeared late in 2020. He is a recipient of the Alexandria International Poetry Prize (1981), the Bridport Prize (1998), the TLS Centenary Prize (2001) and a Cholmondeley Award (2008).

== Background ==
John Greening was born in Chiswick and brought up in Kew and Hounslow. He attended Wellington Primary School and Isleworth Grammar School. Greening studied English Literature at Swansea University. He won a studentship to the University of Mannheim in Germany and then spent a year at the University of Exeter, where he wrote a dissertation on verse drama for his M.A. degree. He married Jane Woodland in 1978.

He has written a series of plays, one of which, about Robert Louis Stevenson, was awarded Best New Play at the Edinburgh Festival. Another, about the Lindbergh kidnapping, was premiered in Asheville, North Carolina in 2002. Others he has staged with young people while teaching at Kimbolton School, and he took a one-man play about Gordon of Khartoum to the Edinburgh Fringe in 1984. He corresponded about his early verse plays with Ronald Duncan and with Ted Hughes. His first play was staged in Exeter – about Robert Schumann.

Greening has taught for much of his life, including two years with Voluntary Service Overseas (VSO) in Aswan, Upper Egypt. Shortly before leaving in 1981, he was awarded the Alexandria International Poetry Prize and received the medal and papyrus certificate from Jehan Sadat on the site of the ancient Pharos. In 1983, after some time teaching Vietnamese boat people in northeastern Scotland, he and Jane moved to Kimbolton, Cambridgeshire (originally Huntingdonshire) where they have lived ever since – apart from a year on a Fulbright exchange in New Jersey 1990–91 – and where their two daughters were born. Greening taught for many years at Kimbolton School and established a poetry reading series at Kimbolton Castle. He has tutored all ages for the Indian King Arts Centre in Camelford, Cornwall, for the Arvon Foundation and currently for the Poetry School in Cambridge, where he was until recently RLF Writing Fellow at Newnham College.

== Poetry publications ==
Greening’s first poems were published in Emma Tennant’s Bananas, and his earliest Egyptian-themed poems appeared in Poetry Review. In the early 1980s, he received a Scottish Arts Council Award while living in Arbroath. His first collection was published in 1982. Over the past forty-plus years, he has published more than twenty volumes of poetry, including two full Carcanet Press collections, To the War Poets (2013) and The Silence (2019), the latter featuring his long poem about Jean Sibelius. Earlier books include his 1991 Bloodaxe collection, The Tutankhamun Variations, the more pastoral sequences of Fotheringhay and Other Poems, The Coastal Path and The Bocase Stone, then in 1998 a first "Selected" – Nightflights – and two long poems: Gascoigne’s Egg and Omm Sety, both of which showed a growing interest in the occult. The substantial collection The Home Key appeared in 2003, followed in 2008 by Iceland Spar (the result of a pilgrimage to Akureyri, sponsored by the Society of Authors). These were followed by a more substantial "Selected" – Hunts: Poems 1979–2009 – and the chapbook Knot (2013). In 2016, there was a Heathrow collaboration with Penelope Shuttle, Heath. A further collaboration, consisting of thirty-five years' holiday sonnets exchanged with Stuart Henson, a Postcard to, appeared in 2020. Other recent volumes include Achill Island Tagebuch (2018), Europa’s Flight (2019), Moments Musicaux (2020), The Giddings (2021), Omniscience (2022), The Interpretation of Owls: Selected Poems (2023, edited by Kevin Gardner), and From the East: Sixty Huntingdonshire Codices (2024). A further full collection, Crowning, was published in fall 2026 by Baylor University Press. The long poem Cleopatra-Antony will be published as a pamphlet by Dare-Gale Press in 2027, and a new collection Twenty-seven, containing twenty-seven poems from twenty-seven of his preceding collections, appears in 2027 from Renard Press.

His translations from the German include poems of Goethe, Nightwalker’s Song (Arc Publications, 2022) and the complete two volumes of Rainer Maria Rilke’s Neue Gedichte/New Poems (published by Baylor University Press in 2025 to mark the 150th anniversary of Rilke’s birth).

== Other writings ==
His memoir of life in Egypt, written in prose and verse, Threading a Dream: A Poet on the Nile, was published by Gatehouse Press in 2017.

He has been a reviewer for journals such as Poetry Review, London Magazine, Hudson Review and the Times Literary Supplement. His collected reviews and essays, Vapour Trails (Shoestring Press), was released in 2020. In May 2025, Renard Press will bring out Greening’s large format illustrated guide to poetry – a series of linked essays and poems, A High Calling, or Where Do You Get Your Ideas From?

Other books include guides to poetry (Poetry Masterclass) and to poets (Elizabethan Love Poets, W. B. Yeats, Thomas Hardy, Edward Thomas, the First World War Poets, and Ted Hughes).

His editorial projects include an expanded, illustrated edition of Edmund Blunden's WW1 memoir Undertones of War, as well as editions of the selected poetry of William Scammell (Heft, Renard Press, 2026), Matthew Arnold (True to One Another, Renard Press, 2025), U. A. Fanthorpe (Not My Best Side, with an introduction by A. E. Stallings, Baylor University Press, 2024), Iain Crichton Smith (Deer on the High Hills, Carcanet, 2021), and Geoffrey Grigson (Selected Poems, Greenwich Exchange, 2017). His edition of Molly Holden’s poetry appears from Renard Press in 2027.

His anthologies include Accompanied Voices: Poets on Composers from Thomas Tallis to Arvo Pärt (Boydell & Brewer, 2015), Hollow Palaces: An Anthology of Modern Country House Poems, with Kevin Gardner (Liverpool University Press, 2021), and Contraflow: Lines of Englishness 1922–2022, also with Kevin Gardner (Renard Press, 2023). He has collaborated with composers Roderick Williams, Cecilia McDowall, Ben Parry, David Gibbs, and Philip Lancaster.

== Criticism and reviews ==
Of Hunts: Poems 1979–2009, Glyn Pursglove writes in the poetry magazine Acumen, "Since the end of the 1970s, John Greening has steadily established himself a significant presence in contemporary English poetry.... Beyond the admirable craftsmanship that characterises almost all of his work, one of Greening’s great strengths is his historical imagination... Greening’s major sequences are splendid examples of the poetry of place, extended reflections upon the individual’s place in his community, upon place as the creator (and creation) of individuals, full of specifics, but never merely parochial... There is much here to enjoy and admire in the work of a serious (but never excessively solemn) poet, who cares about both 'facts' and ideas and makes his poetry out of the interpenetration of the two."

On To the War Poets, Denis Joe writes in Manchester Salon: "Too many poets, since [the world wars], seem intent on trying to capture an idea of 'what it was like'.... So it is refreshing to come across this volume of poems from John Greening. None of the poems in this volume make any pretence in attempting to capture some sort of feeling of the war, as one critic put it: 'These are not poems as history lessons.' There is no faux rage about the slaughter of so many men, instead Greening takes us on a journey through the century still recovering from the upheaval of that war.... Greening realises that there is no need for dramatics to put across the feel of war; in this sense he displays a great deal of respect for his audience: allowing them to respond to his poetry in their own way and at their own time. In doing so he captures the humanity of the war poets, who, in their own way, also rejected hysteria in regards to their own work, and in many ways gave a feeling of ordinariness to their experience of the war.... [To the War Poets] is a volume of contemporary poetry in the truest sense that I hope will be read in many years to come, alongside the works of the War Poets."

On The Silence, David Malcolm writes in Poetry Salzburg Review: "John Greening’s The Silence is a fine collection of verse – coherent and yet varied, constantly fresh and insightful, often deeply moving, deploying a language that is as vibrant as its vision of the world. It is a collection to return to frequently, in order to immerse oneself in its richness, its darkness, and its felicity of voice." Frank Beck writes in Manhattan Review, "It's a loving and inventive meditation on the sources of creative inspiration; the vagaries of artistic confidence; and the ability of the mind to keep observing, associating and struggling to build connections, even when those connections unravel, again and again." Kevin Gardner writes in PN Review of the long poem about Sibelius: "The Silence is a compelling exploration of the pressure of fame and the burden of creativity. It is, moreover, an affecting and exquisite poem. The structure sets order at odds with chaos: formal quatrains work in counterpoint against lines of variable syllabic count, while a steady slant-rhyme scheme is disrupted by an adroit use of enjambment."

Of Achill Island Tagebuch, Martyn Crucefix writes: "Greening's long-established deftness with poetic form is on full display here but it is the (seeming) ease of encompassing that is so impressive. The hedgerows of 'trickling fuchsia' and the 'decayed tooth' of Slievemore are conjoined with be-helmeted cycling jaunts, ill-informed tourists and European research students, while the writer frets about whether the Muses are going to turn up or the disturbing nature of his own dreams – all this alongside more newsworthy items like forest fires on the Greek mainland, Brexit (of course), the discovery of water on Mars and the release of the new Mission Impossible film."

On Hollow Palaces: An Anthology of Modern Country House Poems, Rishi Dastidar writes in Wild Court: "Even if you are someone for whom the city is thrill, escape and potential, when in Britain – and especially England – you cannot escape the lure, the lurking presence of the country house. How could you? So much history, so much of who we are runs under their eaves, through their landscaped gardens. The ruins and relics they are today both tourist attractions and repositories of social memory. A posit: going round country houses is almost the perfect form of recreation for the English, combining as it does walking, queuing, snooping, and property. Very expensive property. And this is history very much alive, right now.... [T]hese piles of bricks clearly still retain a symbolic power, beyond that of being sumptuous settings for Sunday night TV dramas. Unsurprisingly, these houses are fertile territory for poets to roam across, as documented in Hollow Palaces ... a fabulous assemblage of work that does make you think about these buildings in new ways. What appeal does this anthology have to those of us in boxes of concrete and glass, starter Barratt homes or suburban mock Tudor villas? As it turns out, a lot. Mostly this is driven by the way the book is organised, grouped into what at first glance are surprising themes: Insiders, Ghosts & Echoes, Rites & Conversions, Fixtures & Fittings, Loyalties & Divisions, Arrivals & Departures, Dreams & Secrets, and Outsiders. What this allows for is pleasing commonalities to pop up (Wendy Cope in conversation with Yeats in Lissadell is a particular treat), as we go below stairs, explore the gothic, peel back layers of artifice and patterning, on the walls and in the gardens."

Of The Interpretation of Owls, John Forth writes in London Grip: "Edited in consultation with the poet, this first American collection presents a poetic journey of more than forty years, and it is exceedingly well-travelled. Arranged in sections to illustrate abiding interests and influences, the book comprises nearly 300 poems from twenty-two collections by eighteen publishers, and also previously uncollected and unpublished work. ... It is both joy and jolt to be confronted by eleven 'mini-selecteds' of thirty-odd pages organised by theme. Surprises and new relationships between poems abound. ... This collection lays down a challenge for all young poets approaching their seventies: how to be more profound, allusive and observant whilst also prolific and user-friendly. I struggle to grasp how he’s doing it, but I can see it’s being done. ... It's a treasure, hopefully to boost bucks and fame across the pond for one of our best, brightest and busiest poets of the last forty-odd years."

Of From the East, John Whale writes in Stand: "In his hands the tercet is capable of a fine range which includes bold humour, subtle wit and delicate emotion. Throughout the sequence ingenuity is apparent, but never pushes for attention in its own right."

== Honours and awards ==
Greening received the Alexandria International Poetry Prize in 1981 and the Scottish Arts Council Award. Greening was one of the top six of the Observer Poetry Prize in 1987. He has won the Bridport Prize and the TLS Centenary Prize, and he received a Cholmondeley Award from the Society of Authors. He is the recipient of two Hawthornden Castle fellowships and a Fulbright teaching fellowship. Greening has been one of the judges for the Eric Gregory Award. His poem "Sibelius" was chosen by Carol Rumens as her "Poem of the week" in The Guardian, 4 January 2021. Contraflow: Lines of Englishness, 1922-2022 was named a 2023 best poetry book of the year by Rishi Dastidar in The Guardian and by Graeme Richardson in the Sunday Times.

== Bibliography ==
=== Poetry collections ===
- 1982: Westerners (Hippopotamus Press)
- 1984: Winter Journeys (Rivelin Press)
- 1991: The Tutankhamun Variations (Bloodaxe Books)
- 1995: Fotheringhay and Other Poems (Rockingham Press)
- 1996: The Coastal Path (Headland Books)
- 1996: The Bocase Stone (Dedalus Press, Ireland)
- 1998: Nightflights, New & Selected Poems (Rockingham Press)
- 2000: Gascoigne’s Egg (Cargo Press), 2000
- 2001: Omm Sety (Shoestring Press)
- 2003: The Home Key (Shoestring Press)
- 2008: Iceland Spar (Shoestring Press)
- 2009: Hunts: Poems 1979–2009 (Greenwich Exchange)
- 2013: Knot (Worple Press)
- 2013: To the War Poets (Carcanet Press/Oxford Poets)
- 2016: Nebamun’s Tomb (Rack Press)
- 2016: Heath (with Penelope Shuttle, Nine Arches Press)
- 2019: Achill Island Tagebuch (Redfoxpress)
- 2019: The Silence (Carcanet Press)
- 2019: Europa’s Flight (New Walk Editions)
- 2020: Moments Musicaux (Poetry Salzburg)
- 2020: a Postcard to (with Stuart Henson, Red Squirrel Press)
- 2021: The Giddings (Mica Press)
- 2022: Omniscience (Broken Sleep Books)
- 2023: The Interpretation of Owls: Selected Poems (Baylor University Press)
- 2024: From the East: Sixty Huntingdonshire Codices (Renard Press)
- 2026: Crowning (Baylor University Press)
- 2027: Twenty-seven (Renard Press)
- 2027: Cleopatra-Antony (Dare-Gale Press)

=== Prose ===
- 2004: Poets of the First World War (Greenwich Exchange)
- 2005: W.B.Yeats (Greenwich Exchange)
- 2007: Thomas Hardy: The Emma Poems (Greenwich Exchange)
- 2007: The Poetry of Ted Hughes (Greenwich Exchange)
- 2008: Edward Thomas (Greenwich Exchange)
- 2010: Elizabethan Love Poets (Greenwich Exchange)
- 2011: Poetry Masterclass (Greenwich Exchange)
- 2017: Threading a Dream: A Poet on the Nile (Gatehouse Press)
- 2020: Vapour Trails: Reviews and Essays (Shoestring Press)
- 2025: A High Calling, or Where Do You Get Your Ideas From? (Renard Press)

=== As translator ===
- 2022: Nightwalker's Song (Arc Publications) - translations of Johann Wolfgang von Goethe
- 2025: New Poems (Baylor University Press) - translations of Rainer Maria Rilke

=== As editor ===
- 2015: Accompanied Voices: Poets on Composers (Boydell & Brewer)
- 2015: Edmund Blunden’s Undertones of War (Oxford University Press)
- 2017: Geoffrey Grigson: Selected Poems (Greenwich Exchange)
- 2018: Ten Poems about Sheds (Candlestick Press)
- 2021: Iain Crichton Smith: Deer on the High Hills (Carcanet Press)
- 2021: Hollow Palaces (with Kevin Gardner, Liverpool University Press)
- 2023: Ten Poems about Rubbish (Candlestick Press)
- 2023: Contraflow: Lines of Englishness 1922-2022 (with Kevin Gardner, Renard Press)
- 2024: U.A. Fanthorpe: Not My Best Side: Selected Poems (Baylor University Press)
- 2025: Matthew Arnold: True to One Another: Selected Poems (Renard Press)
- 2026: William Scammell: Heft: Selected Poems (Renard Press)

=== Plays ===
- 1976: Schumann (premiered at University of Exeter in 1977)
- 1979: Domna (stage play about Septimius Severus, performed at Kimbolton School, 1985)
- 1980: High Dam (stage play about Nubians)
- 1981: The Isis Myth (stage play about ex-colonials given rehearsed reading at Riverside Studios, Hammersmith)
- 1982: The Stevenson Play (stage play awarded Best New Play (Ind Coop Award) at the Edinburgh Festival)
- 1984: Gordon (one-man stage play later adapted for radio as Between the Two Niles, performed by Stephen Hanvey at the 1984 Edinburgh Fringe)
- 1986: The Maskes of Oliver Cromwell (stage play, first performed at Kimbolton School)
- 1991: A Ladder in Hopewell (stage play premiered in 2002 in Asheville, North Carolina by Jericho Productions directed by Franklin Harris)
- 1992: Philemon and Baucis in the Fens (radio verse play)
- 1993: Voyage of the Argo (stage play first performed at Kimbolton School)
- 2000: Minotaur (radio verse play)
- 2002: Ether (stage play about Sir Oliver Lodge and spiritualism)

=== Interviews ===
- 2012: I Don't Call Myself a Poet: Interviews with Contemporary Poets Living & Working in Britain: "John Greening", by Sophie Wilshaw, 8 August 2012
- 2016: Cambridge 105 Radio: "Bookmark: Ruth Dugdall", 12 January 2016
- 2018: Wombwell Rainbow Interviews: "John Greening", 20 October 2018
- 2021: Fire River Poets: "John Greening", by Graeme Ryan, 1 November 2021
- 2021: Cambridge 105 Radio: "Bookmark: John Greening", by Leigh Chambers, 22 November 2021.
- 2023: Church Times: "John Greening, poet, teacher", by Terence Handley MacMath, 8 December 2023.
- 2024: BBC 1 Songs of Praise: "Faith in Poetry", by Aled Jones, 29 September 2024
- 2024: Poetry Worth Hearing: Episode 27, by Kathleen McPhilemy, 24 October 2024
