= Agnes Bulmer =

English poet (1775–1836)

- Born: 31 August 1775; London, England
- Died: 20 August 1836 (aged 60); Isle of Wight
- Resting place: City Road Chapel
- Occupation: Poet
- Spouse: Joseph Bulmer
- Writing career
- Notable work: Messiah's Kingdom

Agnes Bulmer (31 August 1775 – 20 August 1836) was an English poet. Her work Messiah's Kingdom is thought to be the longest epic poem ever written by a woman, and took over nine years to complete.

== Biography ==
=== Early life ===
Agnes Collinson was born on 31 August 1775 in London, England. She was the third and youngest daughter of Edward and Elizabeth Collinson. The family lived on Lombard Street in London.

Bulmer's parents were Methodists and were friends with John Wesley. Bulmer was baptized by Wesley and was admitted to his school in December 1789. She attended the City Road Chapel, and remained a member of the society until her death. She was also a devout patron of the Church of England.

The family was middle class, and Bulmer's education provided her access to literature, which she reportedly enjoyed. By the age of twelve she had read Edward Young's Night-Thoughts. It was a major influence on her own style. By age fourteen she had published her first work, On the Death of Charles Wesley. Wesley sent her a personal note, thanking her for the piece. He also advised her to "Beware of pride; beware of flattery; suffer none to commend you to your face; remember, one good temper is of more value, in the sight of God, than a thousand good verses. All you want is to have the mind that was in Christ, and to walk as Christ walked."

In school, she befriended Elizabeth Richie Mortimer and Sarah Wesley, the latter being the wife of Charles Wesley. She studied under Hester Ann Rogers in school, and would eventually write an elegy upon Rogers' death.

=== Mid-life ===
In 1793, she married Joseph Bulmer, a London-based warehouse worker and merchant who was also involved in the Methodist church. Additionally, he was successful financially and popular within the church and non-church-related local communities.

The couple socialized frequently and were acquainted with many prominent Methodists, including Adam Clarke, Joseph Benson, Jabez Bunting, and Richard Watson. Clarke regarded Bulmer fondly and stated that she "astonished" him with her intellect and skill. She was described as being a "match for men" in Wesleyan Methodist Magazine in regards to her intelligence and interests. However, many writers also described as being equal yet "feminine" in her qualities by numerous writers, showing that men believed her to be equal while still being, as William Bunting wrote, "domestic" and "delicate."

=== Later life ===
Bulmer taught at City Road Chapel until 1822 and continued writing. She also participated in social activities, including taking part in the activities of the Ladies Working Society, visiting hospitals, and visiting with people in poverty. What is more, she worked on Bible stories for children, which were published as Scripture Histories. Joseph Bulmer died on 23 July 1822 from an illness. Bulmer's mother also died. Consequently, Agnes Bulmer entered into a deep period of mourning, during which she wrote numerous poems concerning death.

Bulmer became sick during a trip to the Isle of Wight and died on 20 August 1836. William Bunting presided over the funeral and Bulmer is buried in City Road Chapel.

== Work ==
Bulmer's earliest published work, On the Death of Charles Wesley, was published in 1788. Bulmer wrote an elegy for Hester Ann Rogers, after Rogers died in 1793. The piece was published in 1794. She wrote Messiah's Kingdom, an epic poem. The latter was published in a series of twelve books, in 1833. Messiah's Kingdom is considered the longest poem ever written by a woman. The piece took nine years to complete, with over 14,000 lines. Her children's biblical stories, Scripture Histories, were regularly published in Methodist publications. She wrote her first biography in 1835, about her friend Elizabeth Mortimer, The Memoirs of Elizabeth Mortimer.

== Sources ==
- "Bulmer, Agnes" . Dictionary of National Biography. London: Smith, Elder & Co. 1885–1900.
