= Fifine at the Fair =

Poem by Robert Browning, published in 1872

- by Robert Browning
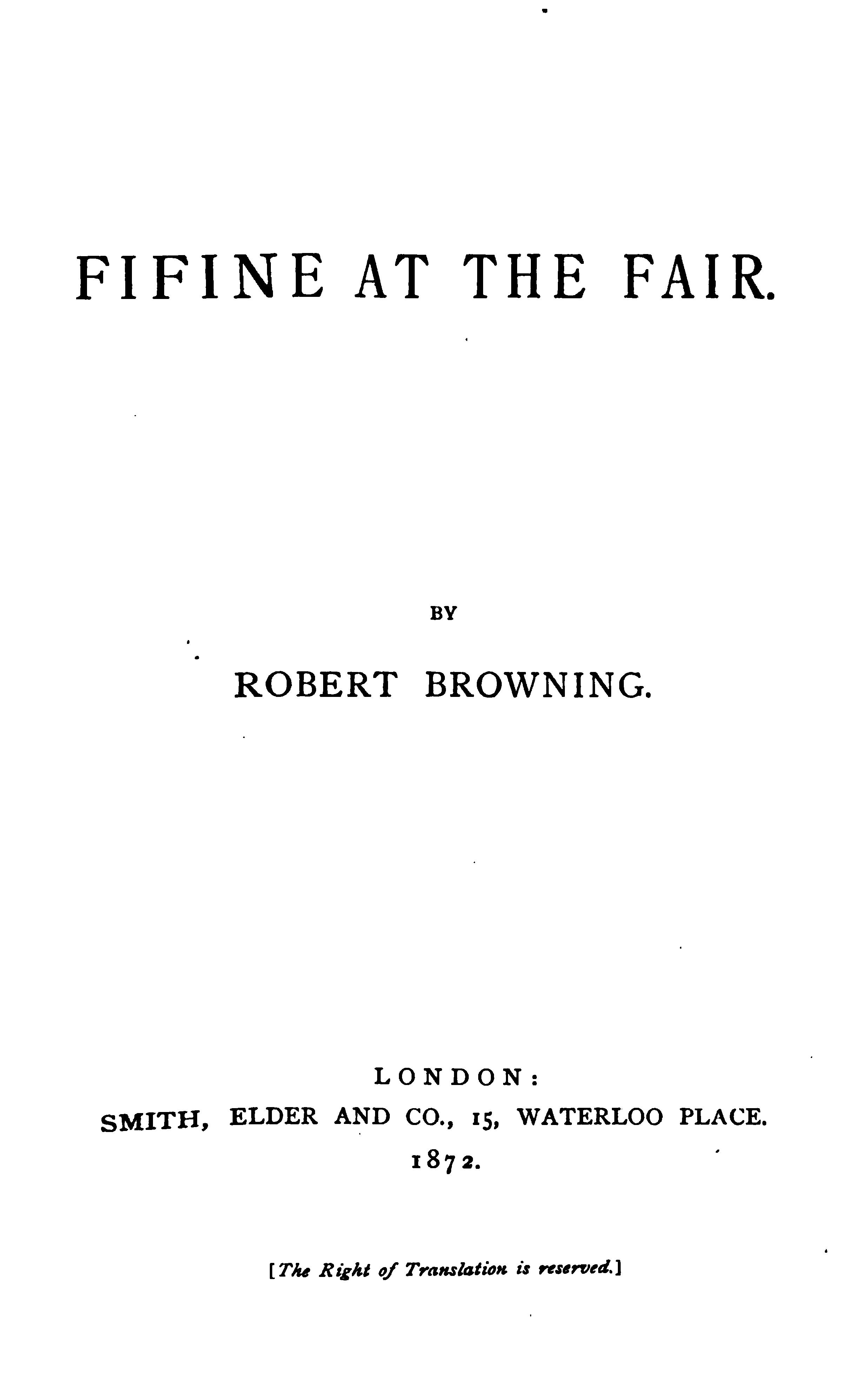
- First edition title page
- Country: United Kingdom
- Language: English
- Rhyme scheme: Couplets
- Publisher: Smith, Elder & Co.
- Publication date: May 1872
- Lines: 2530
- Pages: xii (prologue), 171 (poem)
- Metre: Alexandrine

Fifine at the Fair is a poem in Alexandrine couplets by Robert Browning, published in 1872.

== Analysis ==
=== Prologue ===
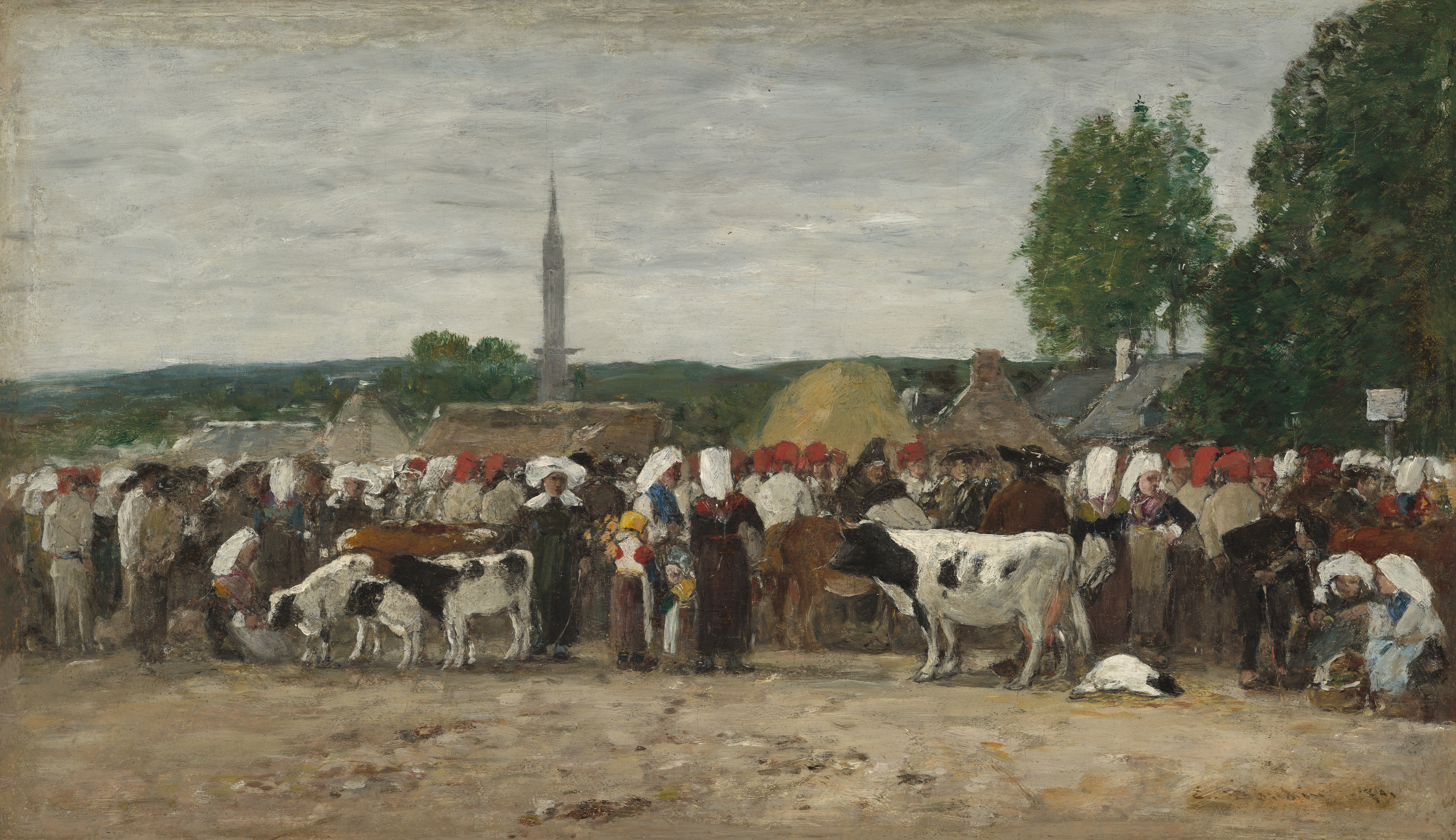
Eugène Boudin: Fair in Brittany, 1874

In the prologue, the poet compares himself to the swimmer who exchanges the solid earth for the free medium of the sea, and, while he floats and meditates, sees above him a glorious butterfly, which has likewise changed its sphere of life from that of a worm on the ground to a denizen of the air. By a natural transition he extends the comparison to a departed soul, freed from the trammels of terrestrial life and transferred to a more elevated existence. In speculating upon those mutations, he professes that he "both lives and likes life's way". Substituting poetry for heaven, he apostrophises a soul which has heaven for its home. He concludes by asking—

Does she look, pity, wonder
At one who mimics flight,
Swims, heaven above, sea under,
Yet always earth in sight?

In those concluding words he intimates that, amidst his poetical flights, he always keeps practical ends in view; and that the ruling subject of his contemplations is the discovery and development of truth.

=== Love and desire ===
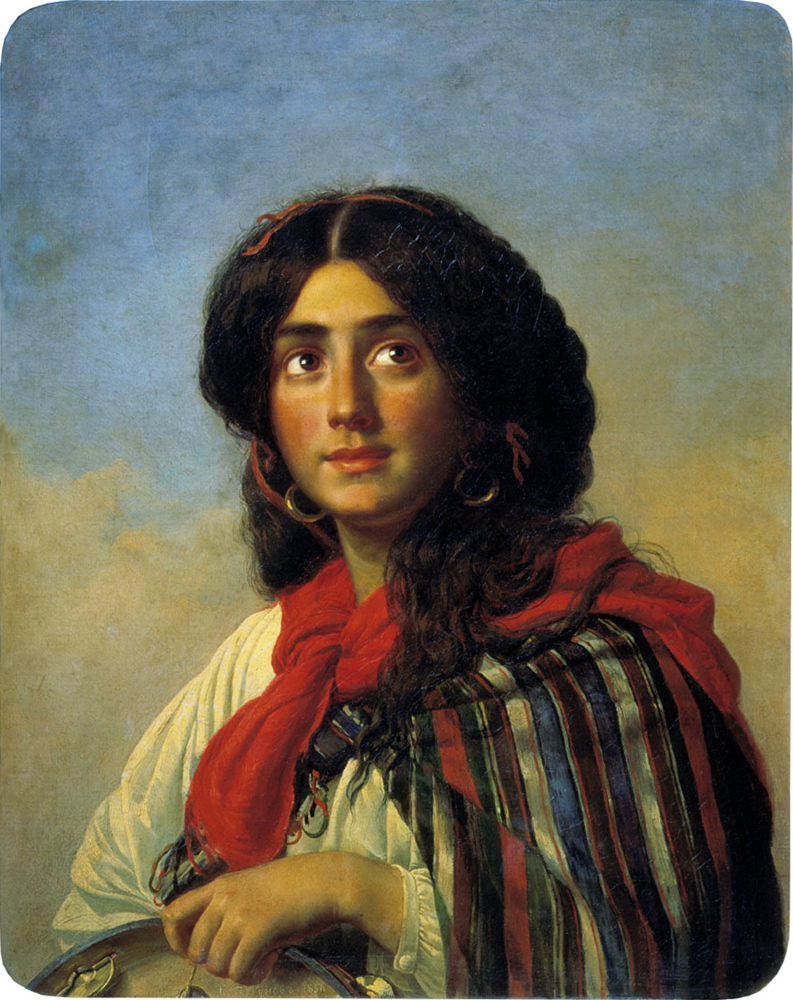
Kirill Gorbunov: Gypsy Woman, 1855

The introductory if not the chief object of the production is to contrast two very widely separated orders of society with reference to the degree of happiness enjoyed by each. Visiting a fair at Pornic, in Brittany, he is led into a train of reverie from witnessing the antics of a company of strollers. He contrasts the vagabond but free life of people who gain their livelihood by wandering from fair to fair, exhibiting their performances to their unsophisticated auditors, and exciting their curiosity by the marvels which they present to them, with, on the other hand, the life of the retired and stationary members of society, who live out of the glare of that unreserved and careless career. The author takes Fifine, the queen of a company of itinerant showmen, as the representative of the former of those classes; and his supposed wife, Elvire, as the type of the other. While exposing the sordid accompaniments of the life passed in the open air, with all its domesticities under the public gaze of a crowd of gaping rustics, he confesses himself somewhat fascinated by the personal charms of Fifine, and her demonstrative display of them; and is led to meditate on what can be the attractions of that kind of life and its almost unrestricted liberty.

Elvire, the poet's wife, is pressed by him to look on at the scenes and actors in the Breton fair. He details to her the squalid realities of both, and the tinselled devices by which the gaudy show is prepared. Confessing an inward sympathy with the reckless freedom of the histrionic strollers, he strives to trace the source of the merry insouciance which seems to make up to them for the loss of what some judge the higher joys and advantages of the civilised society from which they are excluded; and dreams that there may be some germ of goodness and enjoyment yet remaining for man in the things rejected by social conventions. Whatever those attractions of a precarious and erratic life may be, they have at least allured the class of mountebanks to despise what others hold most in honour, and to prefer purchasing the sweets of their degraded life by the privations which accompany it, rather than to accept the civilised state and submit to its restraints. Taking Fifine as a prominent type of her class, after a glowing eulogium of her physical charms, and a tribute to the higher worth of nobler women, he enumerates the attractive qualities of some famous dames, placing Fifine and Elvire side by side at the close. He pleads the common innocence of the infancy of both, and argues that, widely as their paths have diverged since then, even Fifine herself may have some noble disinterestedness in the motives to her occupation, and, in her case,

That, through the outward sign, the inward grace allures,
And sparks from heaven transpierce earth's coarsest covertures.

He generalises the principle that every detail in creation has possessed, or does or will possess, in some particular feature, under some fit concurrence of circumstances, a supreme and exclusive excellence. So with Fifine: she may have some estimable qualities latent. At least her traffic consists only in the display of external grace: she does not, like Helen, offer the prize of queenly beauty; nor, like the voluptuous Cleopatra, make a parade of sensual allurements. The poet deprecates Elvire's jealousy from his praise of Fifine and momentary neglect of herself, by the illustration of his purchasing a "Rafael" at a great price, its suspension in the most honoured place in his gallery, and yet his seeming loss of interest in it, although it is a certainty that he would risk his life without hesitation to preserve it from the flames. Similarly strong is his unobtrusive love for Elvire. In continuation of this comparison, he proceeds to account for his enduring love for her, in reply to her objection that whatever of personal beauty she may originally have has suffered from time. It is in his mind that her true picture is. Wherever the original type of her beauty has been impaired, he supplements unloveliness by love, and

There's the restored, the prime, the individual type.

The poet copiously exemplifies this process of mental reconstruction and restoration by supposing portraits roughly outlined in the sand, and afterwards as roughly amended until they suggest a likeness. So the mind restores for itself what is lost in the lineaments which first created love and sympathy in the soul. Similarly an unfinished or mutilated fragment of sculpture, chiselled by a master's hand, reveals to a connoisseur the intention of the artist, and brings to life again the impaired beauties of his conception. So the memory and the fancy restore the original form and expression of the face by the magic power of love, and of that instinctive artistic reproductive power which still "evokes the beautiful".

Thus souls supplement each other; and thus are restored to the statue, the picture, or the fare, forms and expressions which have been defaced or weakened by the lapse and wear of time. The poet

Gathers heart through just such conquests of the soul
Through evocation out of that which, on the whole,
Was rough, ungainly, partial accomplishment.

=== Man and woman ===
In the course of his subsequent conversation with Elvire, after having explained the transient nature of his fancies respecting Fifine, he enters upon subtle disquisitions on the influence of soul upon soul, and on the distinct modes of dealing with man and woman—he treats the sexes separately in this respect—with the view of invigorating them in their struggles after truth. In the inculcation of truth, or when wishing to "lead, instruct, and benefit", the moral teacher must descend in order to conciliate and manage the masculine mind—

To make, you must be marred,—
To raise your race, must stoop,—to teach them aught, must learn
Ignorance, meet half-way what most you hope to spurn
I' the sequel. . . . . See the deed be brought
To look like nothing done with any such intent
As teach men—though perchance it teach by accident!
So may you master men.

This is to avoid wounding the self-esteem of the disciple; but his mode of treating woman is less indirect and Socratic—

But you have to deal with womankind?
Abandon stratagem for strategy! Cast quite
The vile disguise away; try truth clean opposite
Such creep-and-crawl; stand forth all man and, might it chance,
Somewhat of angel too! Whate'er inheritance—
Actual on earth, in heaven prospective—be your boast,
Lay claim to; your best self revealed at uttermost,
That's the wise way o' the strong.

Woman is proud to act as the auxiliary to the man she loves or esteems. In this the poet compares women to dolphins in the classical fable of Arion. The whole passage constitutes a eulogium on woman—

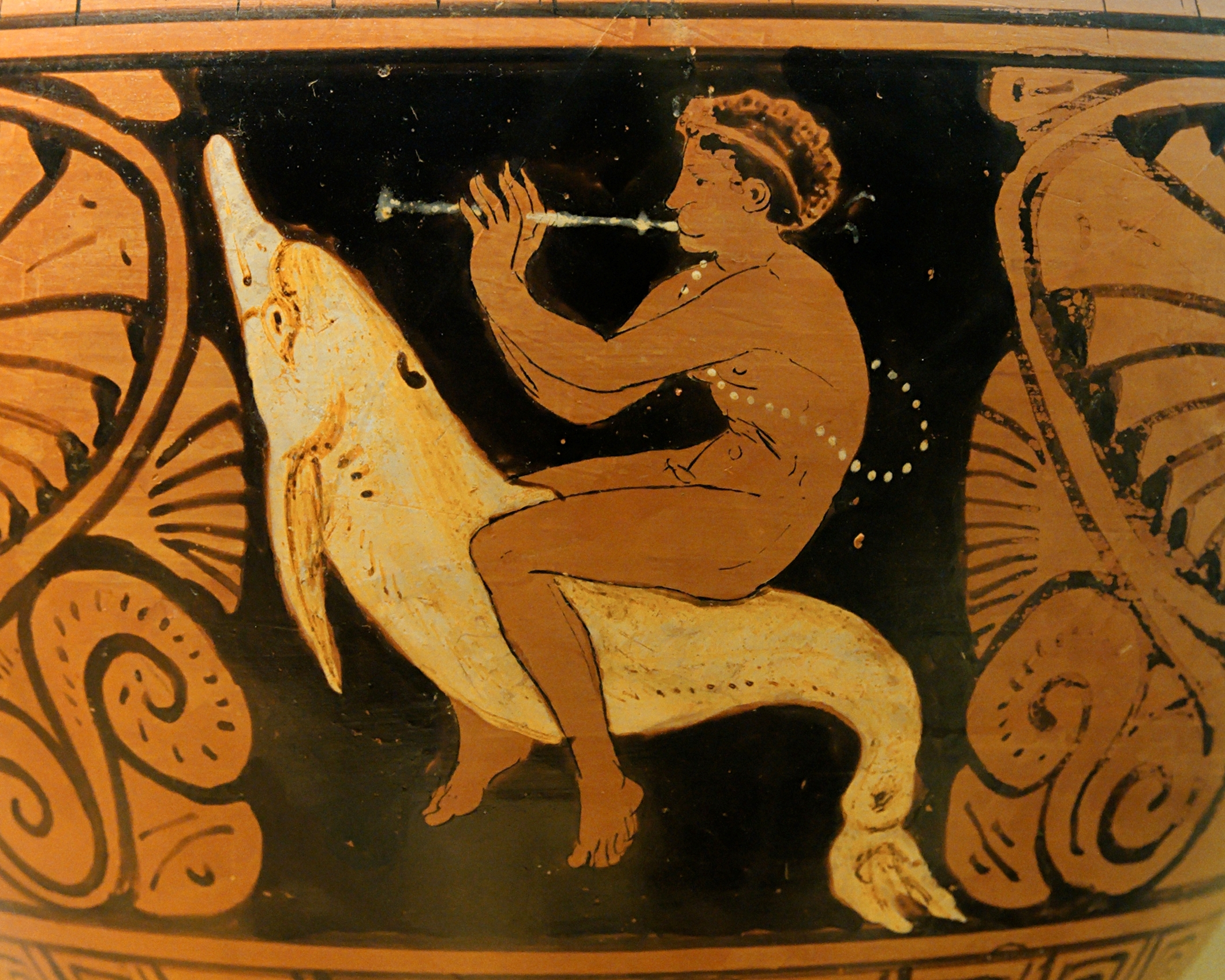
Youth playing the aulos and riding a dolphin. Red-figure stamnos, c. 360–40 BC

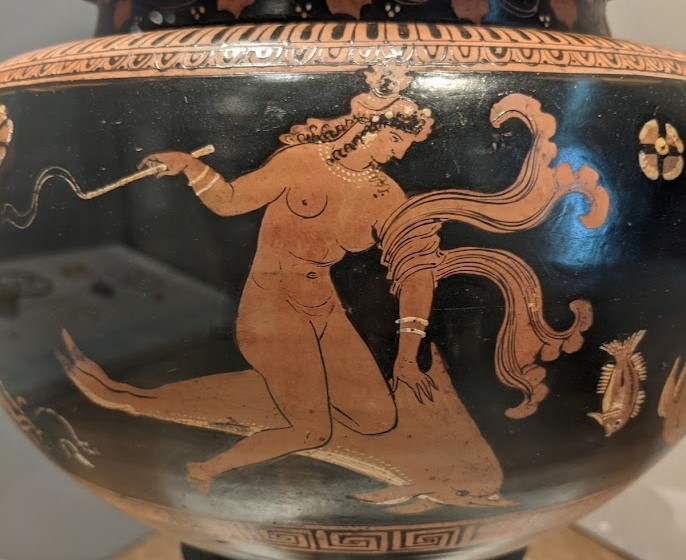
Naked woman holding a whip riding a dolphin. Red-figure dinos, c. 370–30 BC

Gather thy greatness round, Arion! Stand in state,
As when the banqueting thrilled conscious—like a rose
Throughout its hundred leaves at that approach it knows
Of music in the bird—while Corinth grew one breast
A-throb for song and thee; nay, Periander pressed
The Methymnæan hand, and felt a king indeed, and guessed
How Phœbus' self might give that great mouth of the gods
Such a magnificence of song! The pillar nods,
Rocks roof, and trembles door, gigantic, post and jamb,
As harp and voice rend air—the shattering dithyramb!
So stand thou, and assume the robe that tingles yet
With triumph; strike the harp, whose every golden fret
Still smoulders with the flame, was late at fingers' end—
So, standing on the bench o' the ship, let voice expend
Thy soul; sing, unalloyed by meaner mode, thine own,
The Orthian lay; then leap from music's lofty throne;
Into the lowest surge make fearlessly thy launch!
Whatever storm may threat, some dolphin will be stanch!
Whatever roughness rage, some exquisite sea-thing
Will surely rise to save, will bear—palpitating—
One proud humility of love beneath its load—
Stem tide, part wave, till both roll on thy jewell'd road
Of triumph, and the grim o' the gulf grow wonder-white
I' the phosphorescent wake; and still the exquisite
Sea-thing stems on, saves still, palpitatingly thus,
Lands safe at length its load of love at Tænarus,
True woman-creature!

=== Arts and sciences ===
In several other passages the poet makes use of his rich store of classical reminiscences. Contemplating the sea, he felicitously translates from a celebrated ode of Horace—

Illi robar et aes triplex
Circa pectus erat, qui fragilem truci
Commisit pelago ratem. . . .
Quem mortis timuit gradum
Qui siccis oculis monstra natantia,
Qui vidit mare turbidum. . . .
Nequicquam deus abscidit
Prudens Oceano dissociabili
Terras, si tamen impiae
Non tangenda rates transiliunt vada.

Translation:

I class
With those around whose breast grew oak and triple brass:
Who dreaded no degree of death, but, with dry eyes,
Surveyed the turgid main and its monstrosities—
And rendered futile so, the prudent Power’s decree
Of separate earth and disassociating sea;
Since, how is it observed, if impious vessels leap
Across, and tempt a thing they should not touch—the deep?

In a passage in which the author eulogises music, and in particular Schumann's Carnival, he detects a peculiar advantage of musical composition, realised by its creating an indestructible "record" of feelings which would otherwise perish on their first conception—evanescent as the vibrations that issued from the instrument which gave them utterance.

A monumental heap
Of music that conserves the assurance, thou as well
Wast certain of the same! thou, master of the spell,
Mad'st moonbeams marble; didst record what other men
Feel only to forget!

Besides the more important passages, the author's work is replete with little fancies. For example, in discoursing on the undisguised fiction of the drama, he contrasts its confessed illusions with the real hypocrisy and deception practised in social intercourse—

I prize stage play, the honest cheating.

Ridiculing what he considers the preposterous theory of the primitive voluntary development of rudimental organic members from the animals' desires and efforts to possess certain faculties, he ironically lays down that—

Promotion comes to sense because sense likes it best;
For bodies sprouted legs, through a desire to run;
While hands, when fain to filch, got fingers one by one,
And nature, that's oneself, accommodative brings
To bear that, tired of legs which walk, we now bud wings
Since of a mind to fly.

A vision of a Venetian fair and its crowd of grotesque masqueraders gives the author an opportunity of passing under vivid review an array of passions, loves, and hates, symbolised by the various costumes and enlivened by his versatile power of describing the moods of the mind. An example is this picture of sunset—

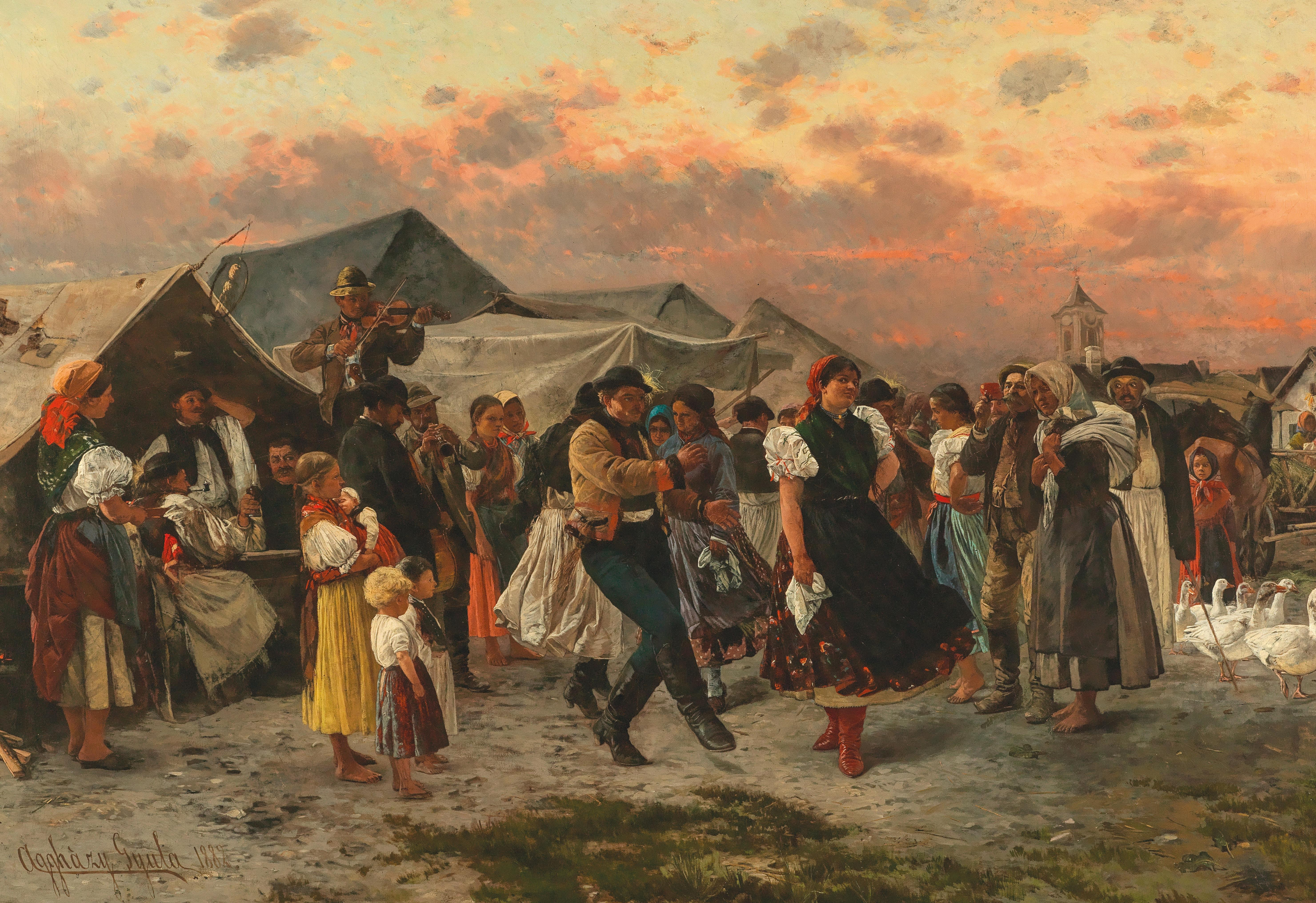
Gyula Aggházy: Dancing at the Fair (Dance Fun on Market Day), 1882

For as on edifice of cloud i' the grey and green
Of evening,—built about some glory of the west,
To barricade the sun's departure, manifest,
He plays, pre-eminently gold, gilds vapour, crag and crest
Which bend in rapt suspense above the act and deed
They cluster round and keep their very own, nor heed
The world at watch; while we, breathlessly at the base
O' the castellated bulk, note momently the mace
Of night fall here, fall there, bring change with every blow,
Alike to sharpened shaft and broadened portico
I' the structure: heights and depths, beneath the leaden stress,
Crumble and melt and mix together, coalesce,
Re-form; but, sadder still, subdued yet more and more
By every fresh defeat, till wearied eyes need pore
No longer on the dull impoverished decadence
Of all that pomp of pile in towering evidence
So lately.

=== Meaning and morality ===
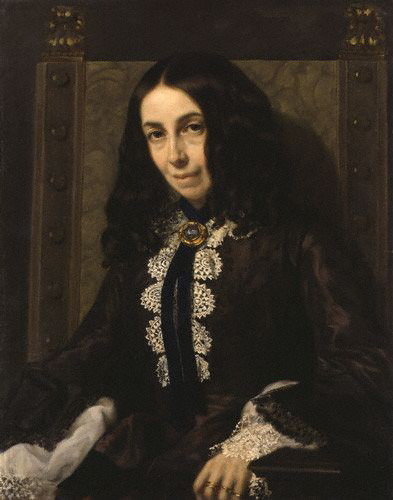
Michele Gordigiani: Portrait of Elizabeth Barrett Browning, 1858

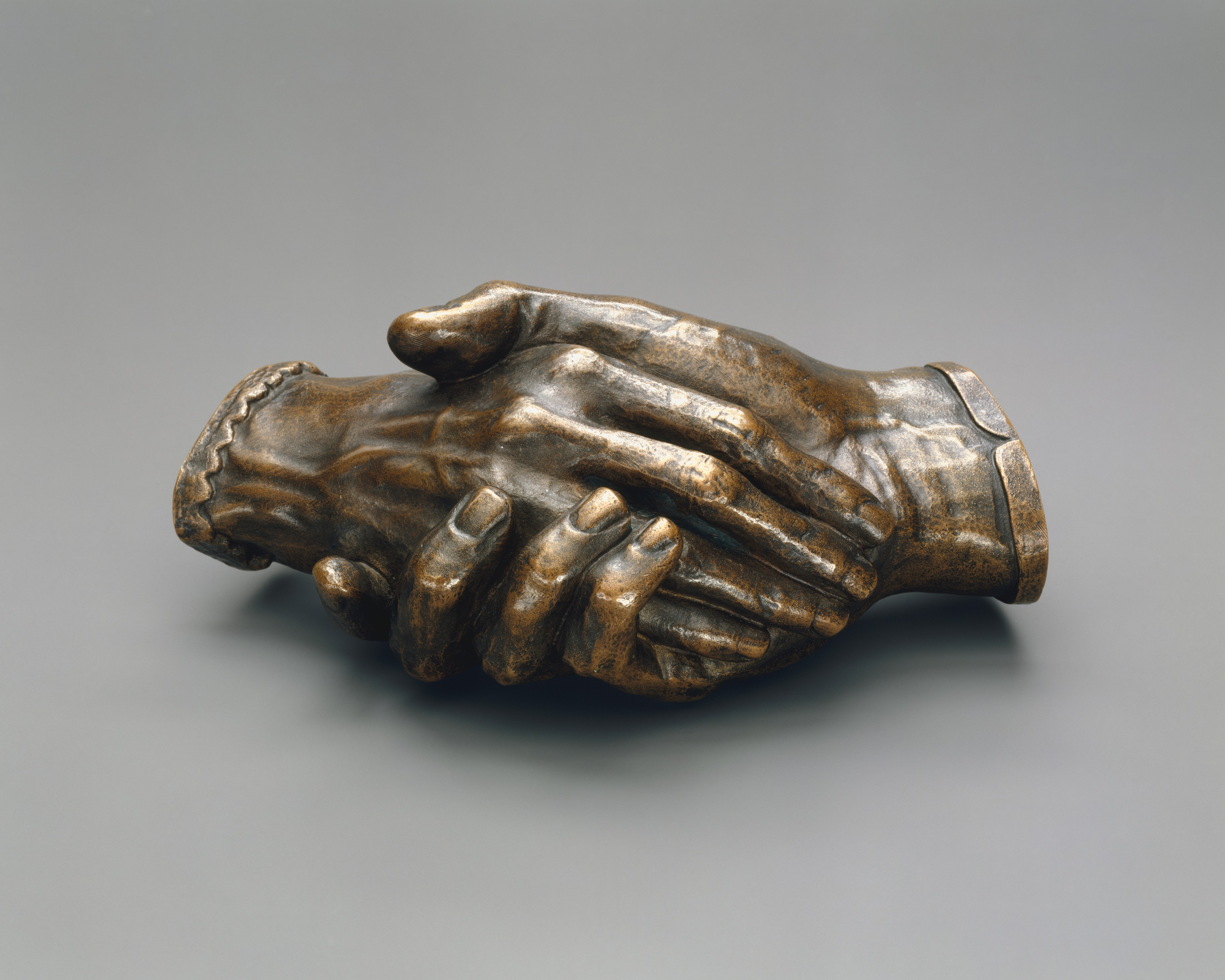
Clasped Hands of Robert and Elizabeth Barrett Browning, 1853

Browning's object seems to be the inculcation of the truth that unmixed and unmitigated evil scarcely exists in the world. Shakespeare lays down the principle that "there is a seed of goodness in things evil"; and the poet's conceptions are also in harmony with the biblical doctrine that the wicked are the instruments in God's hands for working out the ultimate good intended by Him.

The structure and general tone of the poem irresistibly suggest to the reader that it is in some measure intended as the tribute of the poet to the memory of the wife of whom he had been bereaved. To Elvire, throughout the poem, is attributed every endearing quality that can characterise a woman—such as her gentle modification of her husband's bold and comprehensive views of human nature; her easily disarmed resentment when another's image seems for a moment to supersede her own in his heart; her mild but cogent influence in elevating his thoughts to the loftiest truths; her grace, her truthfulness, and her unswerving love. There is a visionary mistiness attendant upon her personality in the poem, although the fervour of the poet's sentiments in relation to her argues that her appearance and presence with him were not "all a dream". At the close of the poem the shadowy disguise is removed, when, after their long rambling, they return to a home of anticipated happiness. He suddenly exclaims at the threshold, in language which pathetically foreshadows her death—

How pallidly you pause o' the threshold! Hardly night,
Which drapes you, ought to make real flesh and blood so white!
Touch me, and so appear alive to all intents!
Will the saint vanish from a sinner that repents?
Suppose you are a ghost! A memory, a hope,
A fear, a conscience! Quick! Give back the hand I grope
I' the dusk for!

=== Epilogue ===
The epilogue confirms the conjecture. It is also darkly suggestive of subsequent sinister events. In the poet's desolation the shade of his lost Elvire revisits hire, and the poem closes with her final words—

Love is all and death is nought.

== Sources ==
- Birch, Dinah, ed. (2009). "Fifine at the Fair". In The Oxford Companion to English Literature. 7th ed. Oxford University Press.
- Browning, Robert (1872). Fifine at the Fair. London: Smith, Elder & Co. pp. i–xii, 1–171.
- Orr, Sutherland (1891). Life and Letters of Robert Browning. Vol. 2. Boston and New York: Houghton, Mifflin and Company. pp. 428–434, 494–495, 569–570.
- Raymond, William O. (1934). "Browning's Dark Mood: A Study of "Fifine at the Fair"". Studies in Philology, 31(4): pp. 578–599.
- Watkins, Charlotte Crawford (1959). "The "Abstruser Themes" of Browning's Fifine at the Fair". PMLA, 74(4): pp. 426–437.
- Whitla, W. (1968). "Browning's 'Fifine at the Fair': Its Social, Literary and Biographical Background, With a Criticism of the Poem". Thesis (Ph.D.). University of Oxford.

=== Reviews ===
- "London, Saturday, June 8". The Daily Telegraph. Saturday, 8 June 1872. p. 5.
- "Literary. Fifine at the Fair". The Examiner. Saturday, 15 June 1872. pp. 600–601.
- "Mr. Browning's New Poem". The Manchester Guardian. Friday, 28 June 1872. p. 7.
- "Literary Notice. Fifine at the Fair". The Liverpool Mercury. Tuesday, 20 August 1872. p. 8.
- "Literature. Fifine at the Fair". The Morning Post. Tuesday, 20 August 1872. p. 3.
