= John Brayshaw Kaye =

American poet, lawyer and politician (1841-1909)

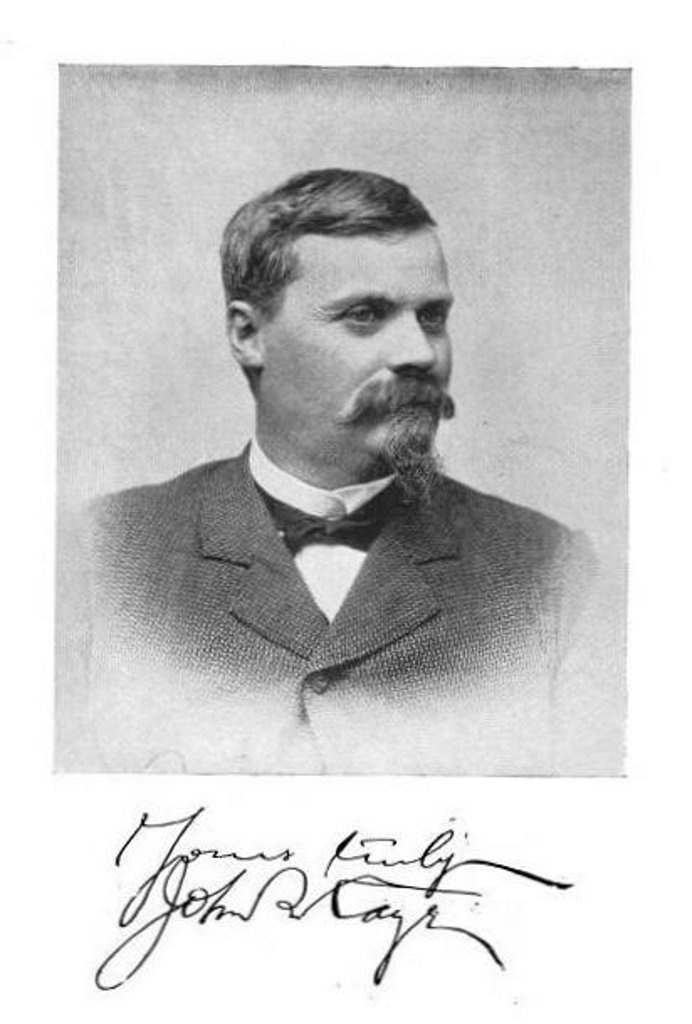
John Brayshaw Kaye

John Brayshaw Kaye (June 10, 1841 – March 29, 1909) was an English-born American poet, lawyer and politician.

== Life and works ==
John Brayshaw Kaye was born in Yorkshire, England, June 10, 1841, the fifth child and the fourth son of Abram and Mary (Brayshaw) Kaye was born in a family of fourteen children. In the following year the parents emigrated to the United States and after three years' residence in Baltimore, Maryland, moved to Pennsylvania. The family afterwards went west in 1848, moving to a farm in Wisconsin, near Lake Geneva, which continued to be the family residence until the death of the parents. There he passed the years of his youth. There, his mind appeared to receive remarkable impressions from the witchery and beauty of the lake, and the splendid scenery which formed part of its associations. To him, it was a rich source of physical and mental recreation. He received his education in the common and high schools here.

=== Move to Nevada ===
Soon after attaining his majority, ill health caused him to make a trip to the far west. In April, 1863, he joined a wagon train and, on the 27th of the following July, he arrived at Virginia City, Nevada, where he remained for three years, doing varying sorts of labor such as burning charcoal, carpentering, etc. and for a time was employed in the famous Ophir mine on the Comstock Lode.

After four years of varied experiences, when, as it might be said, every man carried his bed on his back, he returned to his home. In 1869 he again went to Nevada, the attraction being the White Pine silver mining excitement of that period, also visiting California. In 1871 he came back to Wisconsin.

=== Legal and political career ===
After two years, satisfied with six years of roughing it, he returned to Wisconsin and commenced reading law with the Honorable John A. Smith, of Lake Geneva. Prior to this he had studied law in his hours of leisure. In 1872 he married and removed to Decorah, Iowa, and was admitted to the bar and continued a course of reading law in the office of Baker Brothers — F. E. Baker being a brother-in-law. In 1872 he became a member of the bar of Winneshiek County and at once located in Calmar, Iowa, which remained his home until his death. In 1886, he was elected county attorney, and was re-elected in 1888. He was mayor of Calmar one or two years, and recorder many years.

Kaye was elected county attorney just as statutory prohibition was going into effect, and it fell to his lot to engage in a protracted series of suits against dealers in intoxicants in which he met and vanquished the ablest lawyers of the Winneshiek county bar. Single handed he prosecuted all cases until the attorneys of the liquor dealers were so wearied that they were glad to cry quits. The result was that these suits caused an addition of more than $12,000 to the revenue of the county. He was also engaged in a number of the most noted legal cases tried in that county.

The following appeared in Past and Present of Winneshiek County (1913),

Others who joined the ranks of the attorneys about that time were John B. Kaye, who located at Calmar in 1872. Mr. Kaye was an Englishman by birth, coming to America with his parents in 1842. The family settled near Geneva, Wisconsin, in 1848, and in 1863, Mr. Kaye went to Nevada where he spent four years in gold camps. The next four years were a time of roving with him, but after a year at his old home he came to Iowa. He was a student, not only of law, but of the Bible and all other good literature, and possessed a poetic nature that first found expression in numerous bits of miscellaneous verse. In his later years he produced three books of his writings, the most worthy of these bearing the title of "Vashti." In his legal practice his literary tendency was apt to be shown in his ready application of quotations from various writers. He won distinction in his defence of John Cater of Burr Oak, charged with the killing of his wife, and in his assistance on the side of the state in the Gifford-Bigelow murder trial. Although in each instance he was on the losing side, his handling of the cases clearly demonstrated an unusual ability. (Note: Past and Present of Winneshiek County Published 1913. Volume 1 This volume is the history of the founding and settling of Winnesheik County, the last 53 pages are a Chronology of events from 1840 up to 1913. There are two "all name" indexes, (not in book). One for the main part of the book, and one for the Chronology.)

=== Poetry ===
Early in life Mr. Kaye began writing fugitive verses, and in time these became so numerous that in 1874, they were brought together and published in a volume entitled, Facts and Fancies.

Songs of Lake Geneva appeared in 1882. Both of these works won him praise from critics, as well as negative criticism. (Note: The following review appeared in The Churchman, Vol. 46 (1882), The Lake Geneva which the author here celebrates, and which he might have made immortal, if his songs had been good enough, is in the State of Wisconsin. We have no doubt that it is, as he says, 'pure, lovely, and fair'. There was reason, moreover, for accepting what he says in his personal address: 'When valleys and rivers awaken the muse She may not neglect to accord thee thy dues.' But, for some cause or other, probably through the incompetency of the bard, these poems possess only the slightest amount of poetry. The volume contains, however, other pieces classified as poems of Meditation, of Nature, of Love and Sentiment, of Sorrow, and of Patriotism, some of which are of a much higher order.) But Mr. Kaye's best work was done on Vashti, (Note: Dedication: To my little daughter, named after its heroine and title, this volume is affectionately dedicated) a story based on the biblical story of Esther. It far exceeded all prior efforts, and established a name for its author.

A fourth volume was published posthumously. Kaye was anxious to have it a home production, and to that end had submitted the copy to the copyright office and negotiations were entered into that would have ended in a publication the same year. This last poem was a rehearsal in metrical form of the story of Judas Iscariot's betrayal of Christ. Contrary to conventional opinion, Kaye did not accept the idea that Judas intended to betray Christ, and the poem is a defence of Judas, in which the entire story of the trial before the Sanhedrin and Caiaphas is rehearsed with a clearness that adds his own vision to the biblical account. The critic might not accept Kaye's version of the translation, but might see in it a volume of more than usual poetical power.

== Bibliography ==
- Facts and Fancies (1874) a collection of poems, George MacDonald & Co., Chicago
- Songs of Lake Geneva (1882) and other poems, G. P. Putnam's Sons, New York
- Sweet Lake of Geneva (1885) Belford, Clarke & Co., Chicago
- Vashti, (1894) a poem in seven books, G. P. Putnam's Sons, New York
- Trial of Christ in Seven Stages (1909) Sherman, French & Co., Boston
- "Down a Mountain Flume", article in The Overland Monthly, (Jan. 1892), reprinted in The Nevada Observer
- "Pizen on Hossback" (1889) in Overland Monthly and Out West Magazine
