= The Fall of Saul =

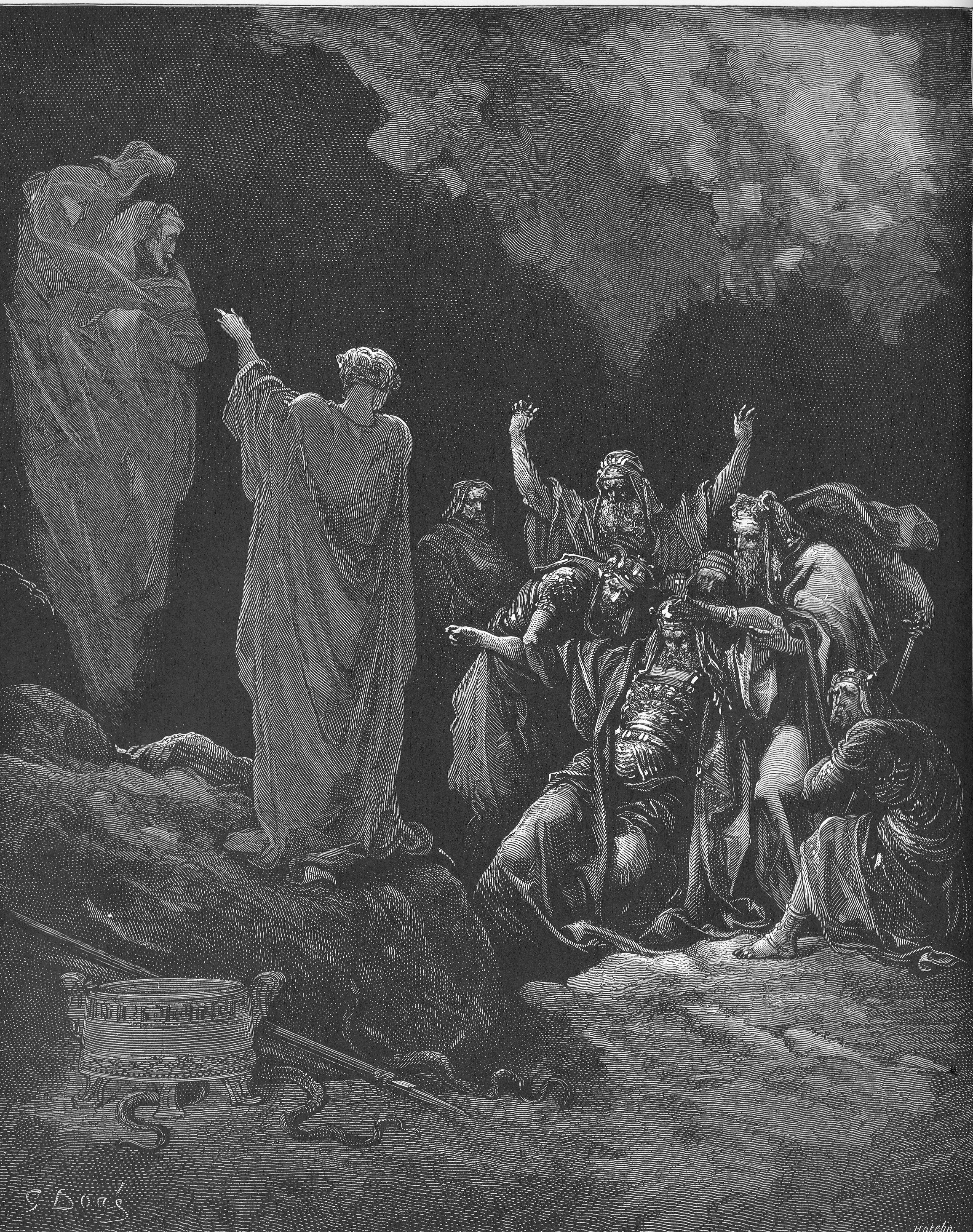
Gustave Doré, Saul sees dead prophet Samuel

The Fall of Saul is a poem by John Gunning Seymer. It was first published in London in 1839 by Stewart and Murray. The story is based on the Bible. The main hero is the king of Israel, Saul. The poem is written in blank verse that is unrhymed iambic pentameter. The tale is divided in six books.

O! for a rapture like the sacred thrill
Which shook the breast of that rebellious seer,
Who thrice struck down the hope of Moab's king,
With glorious visions he might not conceal!
That I might sing, as fits my lofty theme,
How the first monarch of the chosen race
(Crushed by a load of soul-corroding crime,
And tortured by the storm of hate unslaked
And impotent remorse,) at length was hurled
By Heaven's high justice, down to death and shame.

— Book I, lines 1-10

== Bibliography ==
- John Gunning Seymer, The Fall of Saul. A Sacred Epic Poem, Stewart and Murray, London 1839.
