= Ben Copperwheat =

British designer

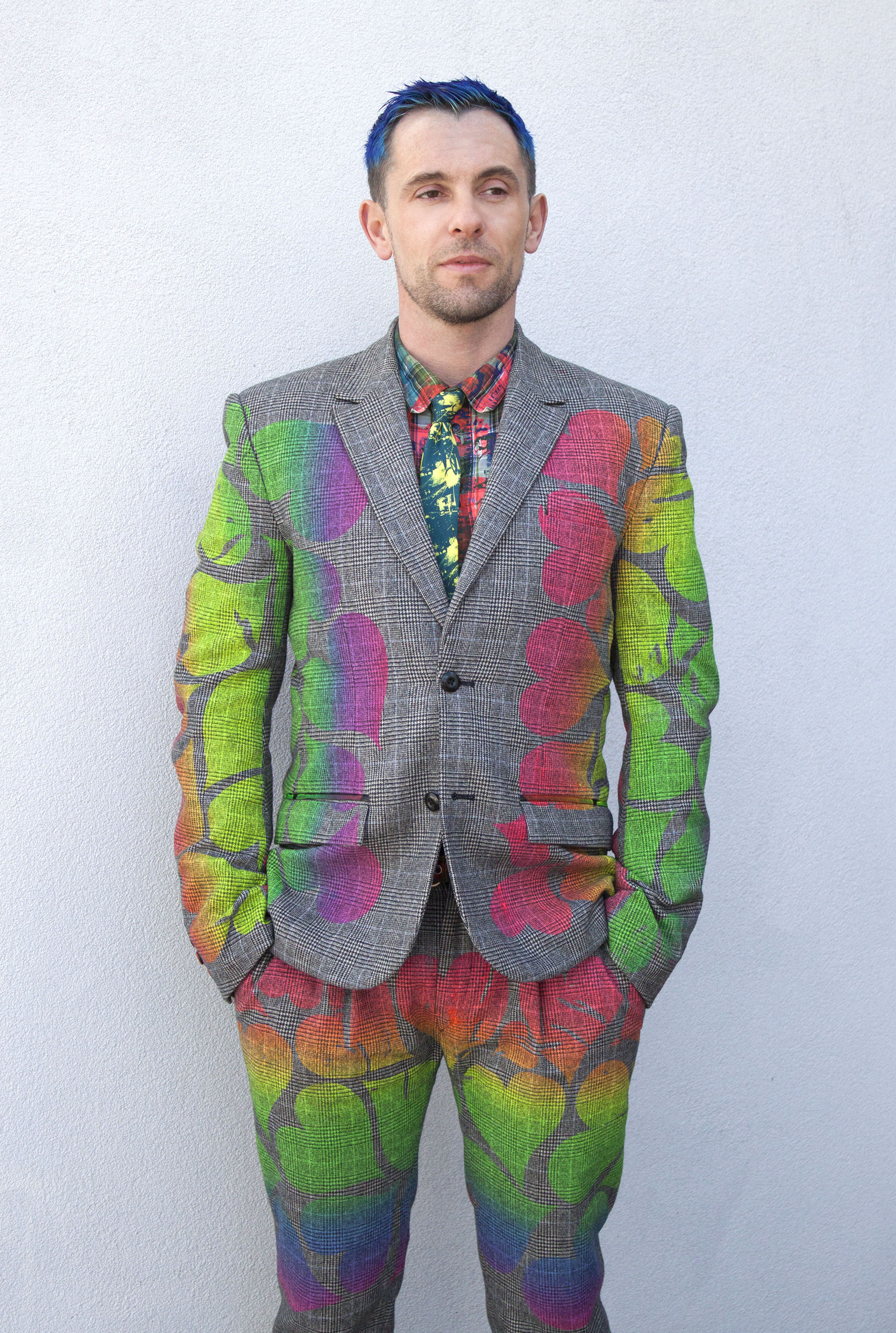
- Born: 30 September 1975 (age 50); Luton, UK
- Occupations: Print designer and artist
- Website: bencopperwheat.com

Ben Copperwheat is a UK-born print designer / artist living and working in Savannah, Georgia.

== Career ==
Ben Copperwheat began his career by teaching textiles in the fashion department of Northumbria University in England. Upon arriving in New York City in 2003, he worked as a print designer for Calvin Klein Jeans where he also designed print collections for Stephen Burrows, Sue Stemp and Peter Som. From 2009 to 2012, he collaborated with his cousin, Lee Copperwheat on their own fashion label, COPPERWHEAT. As a freelance print designer, his work is commissioned by celebrities like Beyoncé Knowles' daughter Blue Ivy Carter (2016 Super Bowl), Boy George (for his 2016 Culture Club Tour), and Liza Minnelli (New York Magazine, 2007). In 2017, Ben Copperwheat painted a New York City Gay Pride parade float for the Gerald J. Friedman Transgender Health and Wellness Program of Lenox Hospital. He was commissioned by rock publicist Jane Friedman (publicist) who started the Howl Gallery. Some of Copperwheat's work has been represented by Emmy-winning, Sex and the City costume designer, Patricia Field. Teaching in the Fibers department at SCAD since 2018, he was also an adjunct instructor at New York University.

== Education ==
Ben Copperwheat graduated in 2001 with a M.A. Printed Textiles from the Royal College of Art in London.
