= Erik Johannes Lönnroth =

Finnish forester and academic

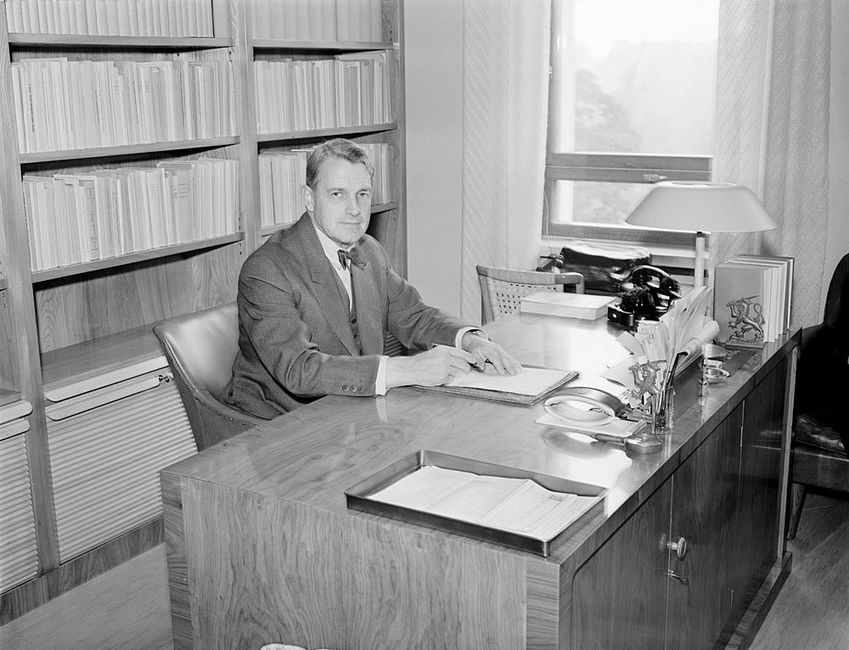
Rector Lönnroth in his office

Erik Johannes Lönnroth (August 2, 1883, Porvoo – December 23, 1971, Helsinki) was a Finnish forester, professor, and rector of University of Helsinki (1950–1953). Appointed professor of forest inventory in 1928, Lönnroth played a central role in advancing forestry science in Finland and was a driving force behind the development of major university buildings, including Metsätalo and Porthania. Widely respected for his contributions to both academia and infrastructure, he was affectionately known by the nickname "Olkikatto-Erkki."

== Personal history ==
Lönnroth's parents were military chaplain Alfons Johan Alexander Lönnroth and Gabriella Leinberg, daughter of composer Lilli Leinberg. His spouse, since 1921, was medical licentiate Elsa Sillman, daughter of forest manager Conrad Sillman and Emilie Wanda Baer. His brother Arvo Lönnroth served as the director-general of the Roads and Waterways Administration and as a professor of railway, road, and waterway construction.

Lönnroth is said to have been particular about not being related to Elias Lönnroth. Lönnroth's family background offers many examples of active influencers: his aunt Alma Forstén founded the Reitkallin Garden School and was a key figure in the Martha organization in Kymenlaakso; another aunt Olga Forstén gained attention as a female choir conductor in both Varkaus and St. Petersburg and organized accommodation for a delegation that took a major petition to St. Petersburg in 1899 at her husband's factory; his father, military chaplain Alfons Lönnroth, served as the long-time pastor in Lappeenranta, and his father's uncle Knut Stjernvall designed Finland's first railway and later became the head of Russia's entire railway administration.

== Professional career ==
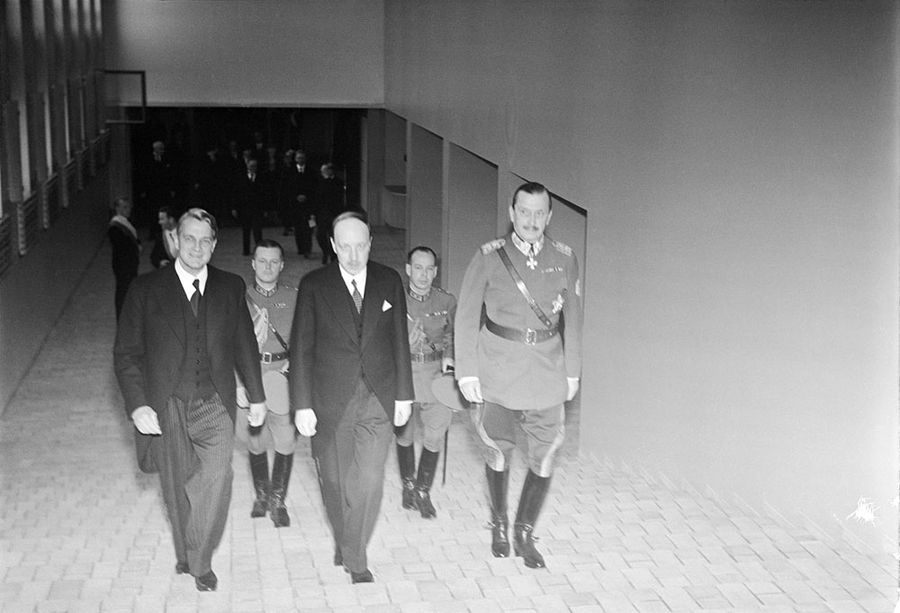
Lönnroth escorting dignitaries at the opening ceremony of Metsätalo. In the image, Marshal Carl Gustaf Emil Mannerheim and Prime Minister Risto Ryti.

Lönnroth taught forest inventory at the University of Helsinki starting in 1914, first as an adjunct professor and then as a professor from 1928. His first scientific publication in 1919, a textbook on forest inventory exercises, remained a standard textbook in the field until the 1950s. Lönnroth's scientific publications covered forest growth and structure, timber measurement, and forest management organization.

His 1929 mathematical model relating forest growth and harvest rates has been a key tool in evaluating the total biomass production of forest ecosystems and in comparing biomass measurements based on continuous production versus one-time investments. For forest inventory, Lönnroth developed a height measurement instrument known as a hypsometer and a device for measuring tree diameter, the dendrometer. In addition to teaching, Lönnroth was active in various roles. His ability to represent and his striking appearance (he was also known by the nickname Vackre Erik) led him to leadership positions in several organizations. In 1938, he was elected president of the International Union of Forest Research Organizations (IUFRO) at its congress, a role he held until 1948. Because of his background, national defense work was always in a focus for Lönnroth's. During the Winter War, he led the recruitment and placement of foreign volunteers, and during the Continuation War, he served as the head of the office at the General Headquarters. His contribution to the creation of Marshal Carl Gustaf Emil Mannerheim's equestrian statue was crucial.
