= Messiah's Kingdom =

Messiah's Kingdom is a long poem by Agnes Bulmer. It was published in 1833. It is regarded as the longest poem written by a woman. It consists of some 14,000 lines grouped in twelve books. The poem is written in heroic couplet but the introduction is made up of four 13-line stanzas like this one:

Of Him, high raised on Heaven's stupendous throne,
Beneath whose feet the sapphire pavement glows;
O'er whose intensest splendours, dread, unknown,
The beaming bow its milder radiance throws;
Around whose state, in bright attendance, close
The full-toned choir of harping cherubim.
Seraphs, whose robes empyreal lights compose,
And angels, breathing soft the' adoring hymn:—
Of Him, Eternal, Infinite, Supreme,
Fain would a mortal Muse, adventurous, sing;
Him, for archangel minds too vast a theme,
Who yet, when babes their meek hosannas bring,
Inclines with gentlest grace, and veils in Mercy's wing.

The poet was praised for "harmonious versification". The poem was reviewed also in The Methodist Magazine and Quarterly Review.

== Bibliography ==
- Agnes Bulmer, Messiah's Kingdom, New York 1833.
