= Dennis Copperwheat =

George Cross recipient in World War II

Dennis Arthur Copperwheat
- Born: 23 May 1914; Rushden, Northamptonshire
- Died: 8 September 1992 (aged 78); Kettering, Northamptonshire
- Military career
- Allegiance: United Kingdom
- Branch: Royal Navy
- Rank: Lieutenant commander
- Unit: HMS Penelope
- Conflicts: Second World War
- Awards: George Cross

Dennis Arthur Copperwheat GC (23 May 1914 – 8 September 1992) of the Royal Navy won the George Cross for the heroism he displayed on 22 March 1942 in scuttling a burning ammunition ship in Valletta harbour, Malta.

== George Cross ==
Following a heavy Luftwaffe air attack on Malta and ships entering Valletta Harbour, Lieutenant Copperwheat (a torpedoes and explosives officer) commanded a squad of men from HMS Penelope sent to scuttle a Norwegian merchantman Talabot (survivor of the convoy MG1), which was laden with ammunition and burning in the busy harbour.

As the men laid scuttling charges, the fires caused ammunition stored on the deck to explode all around them and prevented the charges being laid in the ship's hold. Therefore, the charges had to be draped over the sides of the stricken vessel. The ship lay forty yards from the shore and, as the electric cables required to fire the charges could only just reach the shore, Copperwheat took it upon himself to fire the charges after seeing his men safely to cover.

He was exposed to the full force of the charges he had laid but was successful in sinking the ship. Had the ship been left to burn, the inevitable explosion from the burning ammunition would have caused grievous damage to Valletta's vital harbour. Much of the ammunition from the ship was salvaged and used in the liberation of Italy.

=== Citation ===
Notice of Copperwheat's George Cross appeared in the London Gazette on 17 November 1942:

The King has been graciously pleased to approve the Award of the George Cross to Lieutenant Dennis Arthur Copperwheat, Royal Navy, H.M.S. Penelope.

For great bravery at Malta.

During heavy air attacks on Valletta, Lieutenant Copperwheat was sent in charge of a party of men from H.M.S. Penelope to scuttle a Merchantman, laden with ammunition, which was burning in the harbour. Owing to the fires, it was impossible to place scuttling charges in the holds, and they had to be slung over the side of the ship. As they worked, ammunition was exploding all round them from burning stowages on deck. The ship lay 40 yards from the shore, to which the electric cables for firing the scuttling charges could only just reach. Lieutenant Copperwheat sent his working party to shelter, and stayed himself to fire the charges from a position where he was exposed to the full blast of the explosion, which lifted him bodily. But for his brave action the ship must have blown up, and grave damage would have been done to the harbour.

Moreover, much of the ammunition was saved and some very heavy bombs, part of the cargo, were soon afterwards dropped in Italy.

— London Gazette

Copperwheat became one of only three men to win the George Cross during the siege of Malta.
