= Consuelo Montagu, Duchess of Manchester =

Cuban American heiress (1853–1909)

Her Grace The Duchess of Manchester
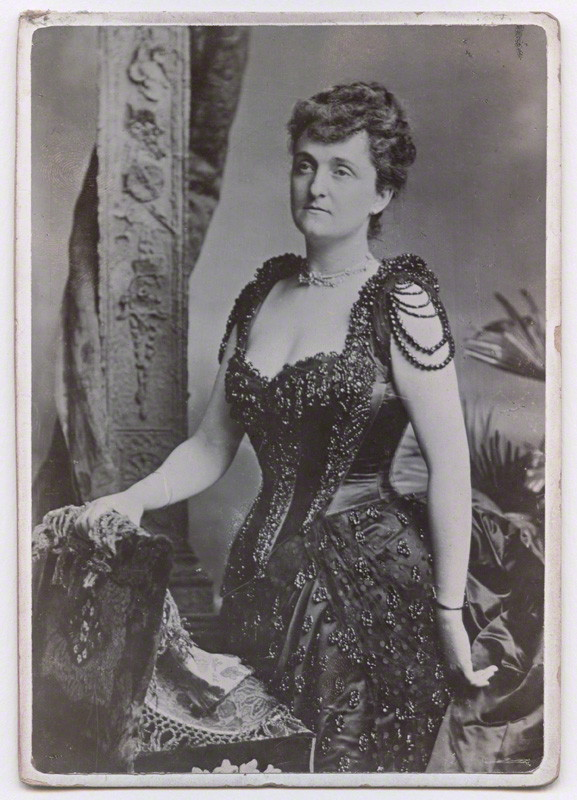
- Born: María Francisca de la Consolación Yznaga; 1853; New York City, United States
- Died: 20 November 1909 (aged 55–56); 5 Grosvenor Square, Mayfair, London, England
- Spouse: George Montagu, 8th Duke of Manchester (m. 1876; died 1892)
- Issue: William Montagu, 9th Duke of Manchester; Lady Jacqueline Montagu; Lady Alice Montagu
- Father: Antonio Modesto Yznaga y del Valle
- Mother: Ellen Maria Clement

Consuelo Montagu, Duchess of Manchester (née María Francisca de la Consolación "Consuelo" Yznaga y Clement; 1853 – 20 November 1909) was a Cuban American heiress who married George Montagu, Viscount Mandeville in 1876. She became the Duchess of Manchester when her husband succeeded to the dukedom in March 1890.

== Family background ==
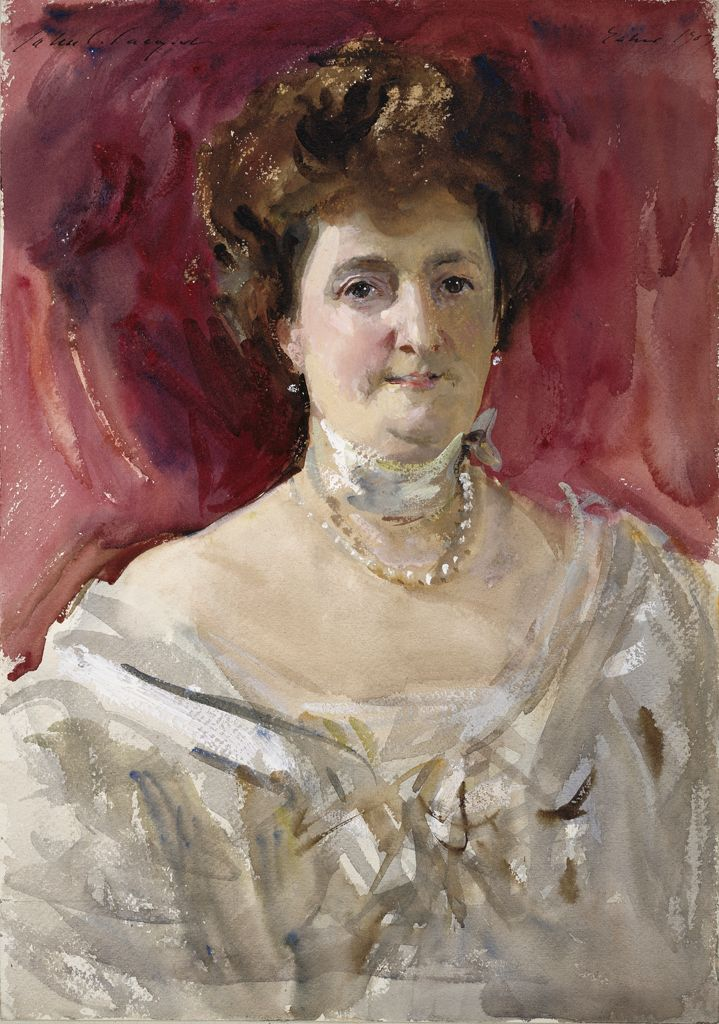
Portrait by John Singer Sargent, 1907

Consuelo Yznaga was born in 1853, in New York City, the second of four children of diplomat Don Antonio Modesto Yznaga y del Valle and Ellen Maria Clement of Ravenswood Plantation, Concordia Parish, Louisiana. She was the paternal granddaughter of José Antonio de Yznaga y Borrell and his wife María Francisca del Valle y Castillo and maternal granddaughter of the steamboat captain and plantation owner Samuel Clement from Dutchess County, New York and Maria Augusta Little, daughter of William Little and wife Frances Boyd. Her father was from a Cuban noble family that owned a large plantation, Torre Iznaga, and sugar mills in the vicinity of Trinidad, Cuba; they had connections to several Spanish aristocratic families.

She grew up at Ravenswood Plantation in Concordia Parish, which she later inherited. Her parents also acquired properties in New York and in Newport, Rhode Island.

Her sister, María de la Natividad "Natica" Yznaga, married Sir John Lister-Kaye on 5 December 1881. Her brother, Fernando Yznaga, was married to Mary Virginia "Jennie" Smith, sister of Alva Belmont, Consuelo's childhood best friend. Vanderbilt's daughter Consuelo Vanderbilt was her god-daughter and named after her.

== Life and activities ==
In her teenage years, she became known on New York's social scene as one of the group known as the Buccaneers. She was a renowned beauty, as were her sisters.

The Duchess was a celebrated society figure, belonging to the intimate circle of Edward VII of the United Kingdom, formerly the Prince of Wales. Shortly before her death, she entertained King Edward and Nicholas II, the Tsar of Russia, while the Tsar was on a visit to England.

During her marriage, she engaged in charitable causes. Poverty was a cause that concerned her, and she was also interested in education and health.

Upon her brother's death in 1901, he left her $2 million ($60 million in 2018 rate).

== Marriage and issue ==
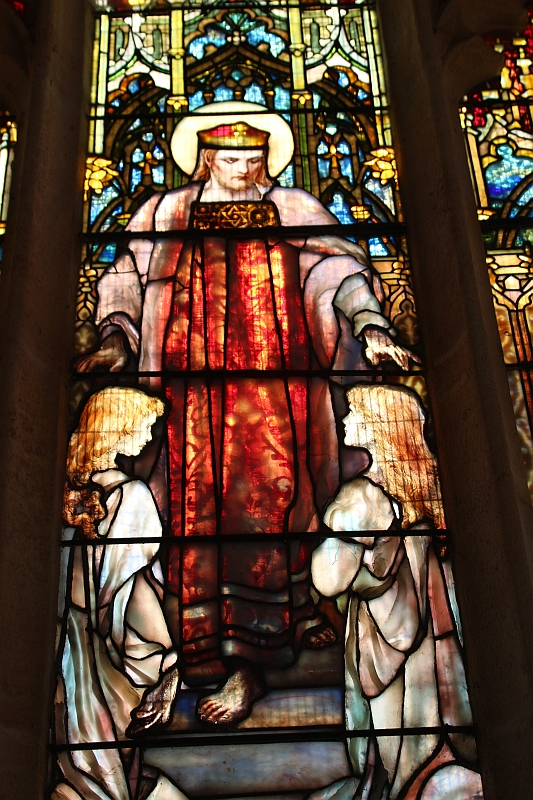
Window by Tiffany in St Andrew's Church, Kimbolton, Cambridgeshire, given in memory of her twin daughters

In the autumn of 1875, she met George Montagu, Viscount Mandeville, at her father's country home in Morristown, New Jersey. On 22 May 1876, at Grace Church, Manhattan, she married Viscount Mandeville. Her dowry was $6 million (in 2018 rate). After their marriage, they settled on Montagu's Irish estate, centered on Tandragee Castle in County Armagh.

They had one son and twin daughters:

- William Montagu, 9th Duke of Manchester (1877–1947), who married, firstly, Helena Zimmerman, in 1900, and had issue. They divorced in 1931, and he then married Kathleen Dawes (d. 1966), on 17 December 1931.
- Lady Jacqueline Mary Alva Montagu, known as "May" (1879–1895), who, although not diagnosed before she died, is commonly believed to have died of tuberculosis, then called consumption.
- Lady Alice Eleanor Louise Montagu, known as "Nell" (1879–1900), who died of consumption.

Her fortune was soon lost to her husband's habits in less than ten years. Viscount Mandeville spent so much cash on gambling and mistresses that his father the 7th Duke banished the couple to Tandragee Castle, the family seat in Ireland, until 1883.

== Later life and legacy ==
In 1904, the Duchess took on the lease of 5 Grosvenor Square, Mayfair. She died there of neuritis on 20 November 1909. At her bedside upon her death were her sisters, Lady Lister-Kaye and Emily Yznaga. Her estate, valued at $2,493,131 (an approximate value of $69 million in 2017 rates), was left to her various family members. Her son, the 9th Duke, inherited the Grosvenor Square house, retaining it until 1914 when it became a wartime hospital.

On her death in 1909, the Duchess bequeathed a ruby and diamond bracelet to her friend Queen Alexandra of Denmark. The Manchester Tiara, created for the Duchess by Cartier in 1903, is now in the collection of the Victoria and Albert Museum, London. In 2007 the Manchester Tiara was accepted by the British government in lieu of inheritance tax following the death of the 12th Duke. Her diamond and emerald necklace, originally bequeathed to her grandson Viscount Mandeville, was auctioned by Sotheby's in 2015.

During the 2014-2015 exhibition at London's National Portrait Gallery, she was featured among the high-profile American heiresses to marry into British aristocracy. Also included in the exhibition were Margaret Leiter (married to the 19th Earl of Suffolk), Jennie Jerome (married to Lord Randolph Churchill), Mary Leiter (married to the 1st Marquess Curzon of Kedleston), May Cuyler (married to Sir Philip Grey Egerton, 12th Bt), Consuelo Vanderbilt (married to the 9th Duke of Marlborough and to Jacques Balsan), Laura Charteris (married to the 10th Duke of Marlborough) and Cornelia Martin (married to the 4th Earl of Craven).
