= Duchess of Manchester =

Duchess of Manchester is a title given to the wife of the Duke of Manchester. Women who have held the title include:

- Isabella Montagu, Duchess of Manchester (c. 1706–1786)
- Elizabeth Montagu, Duchess of Manchester (c. 1740–1832)
- Louisa Cavendish, Duchess of Devonshire (1832–1911), formerly Duchess of Manchester
- Consuelo Montagu, Duchess of Manchester (1853–1909)
- Helena, Countess of Kintore (1878–1971), formerly Duchess of Manchester
