= Helena Keith-Falconer, Countess of Kintore =

American heiress (1878–1971)

The Right Honourable The Countess of Kintore
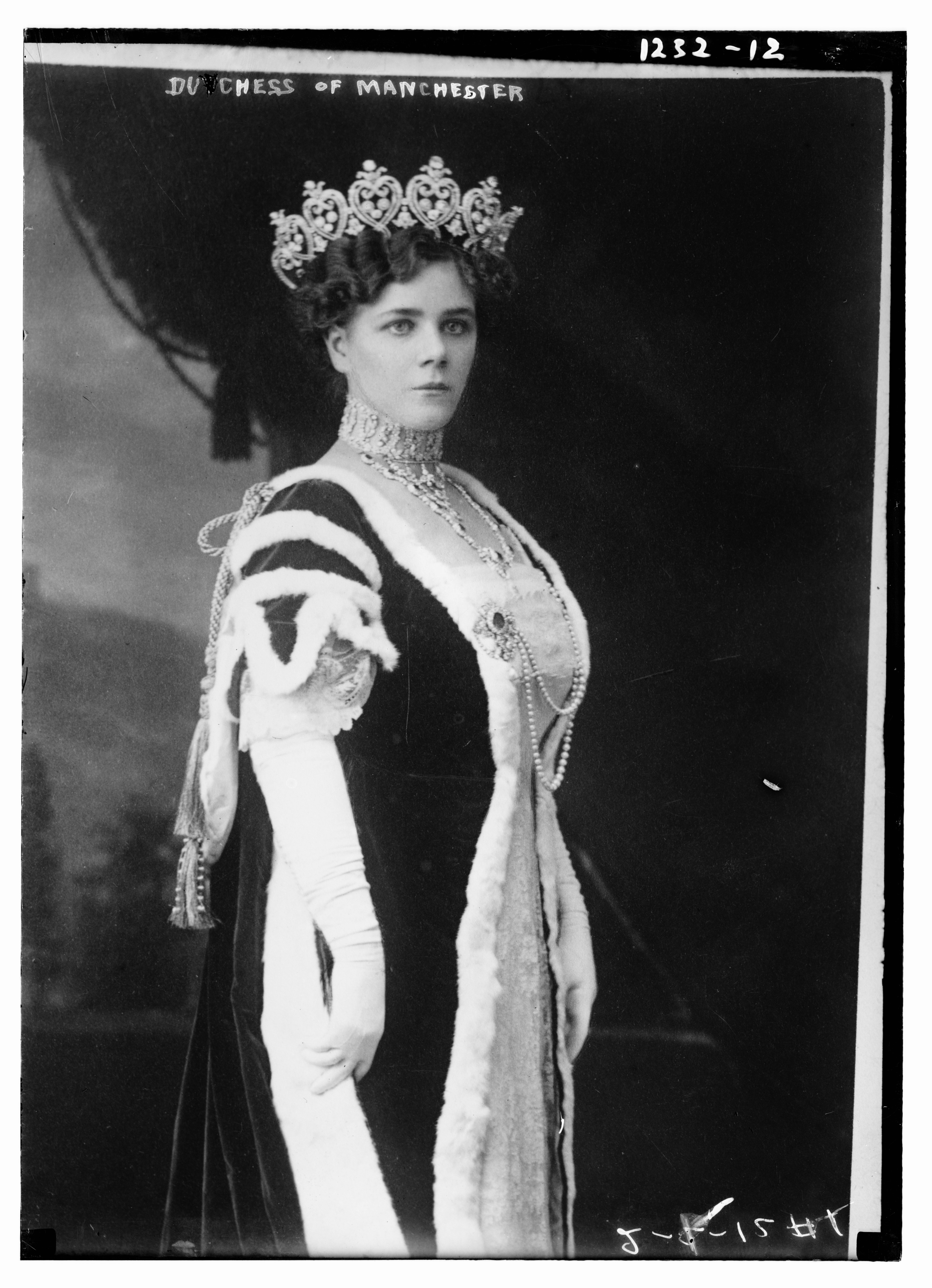
- Helena, Countess of Kintore, wearing the Manchester Tiara in 1912

Personal details
- Born: Helena Zimmerman; 25 September 1878 Cincinnati, Ohio, U.S.
- Died: 15 December 1971 (aged 93) Keith Hall, Inverurie, Scotland
- Spouse(s): The 9th Duke of Manchester (m. 1900; div. 1931) The 10th Earl of Kintore (m. 1937; died 1966)
- Children: Lady Mary Gregory; The 10th Duke of Manchester; Lord Edward Montagu; Lady Ellen Shairp
- Parent(s): Eugene Zimmerman; Marietta Evans
- Relatives: The 11th Duke of Manchester (grandson); The 12th Duke of Manchester (grandson)
- Other name: The Duchess of Manchester (1900–1931)

Helena Keith-Falconer, Countess of Kintore, formerly Helena Montagu, Duchess of Manchester (née Zimmerman; 25 September 1878 – 15 December 1971), was an American heiress who twice married into the British aristocracy, firstly to the 9th Duke of Manchester and then to the 10th Earl of Kintore.

== Early life ==
Helena was born in Cincinnati, Ohio, on 25 September 1878. She was the only child of Eugene Zimmerman and wife Marietta (née Evans) Zimmerman, who died of peritonitis in 1882 when Helena was just four years old.

Her father had been born in Vicksburg, Mississippi, where his father owned a factory. During the Civil War, his factory burned down and he enlisted in the Union Navy, serving with distinction. After the war, Eugene went into the oil business, acquiring extensive holdings which he sold to John D. Rockefeller in exchange for shares in Standard Oil where he became a substantial stockholder and gained seat on the company's board. He used his income to invest in railroads, becoming president of several lines, including the Cincinnati, Hamilton and Dayton Railway and the Ann Arbor Railroad, and incredibly wealthy.

Her father sent her to France, where she lived for many years, was educated and became accomplished in horsemanship and fencing.

== Personal life ==
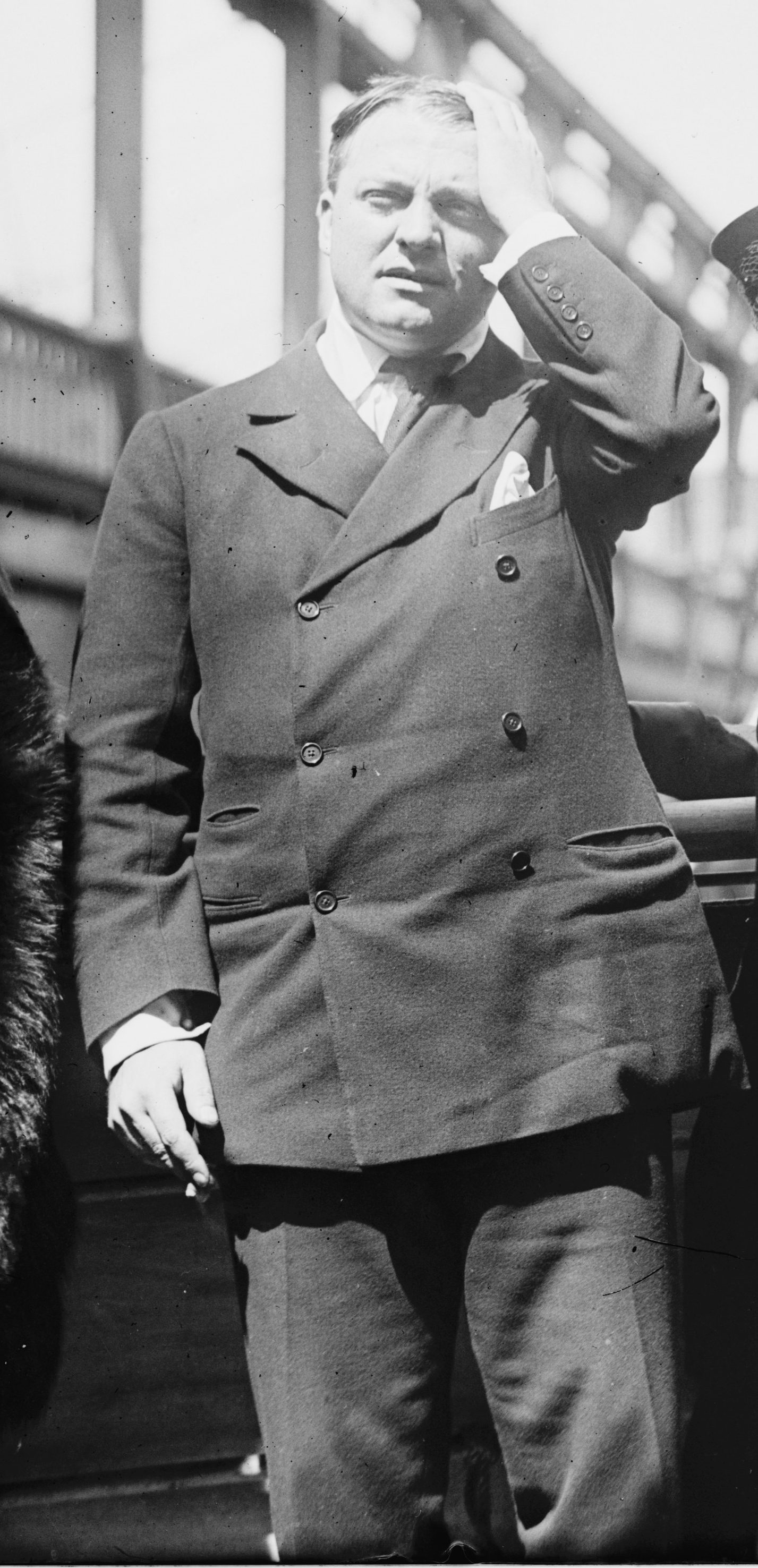
Her first husband, the 9th Duke of Manchester, 1900

While attending a costume ball at a Brittany coast resort in Dinard, France, the twenty-one year old Helena met William Angus Drogo Montagu, 9th Duke of Manchester, who was then twenty-three. He was the only son of the late 8th Duke of Manchester and his wife, the Cuban American heiress Consuelo Yznaga. On 14 November 1900, they married at Marylebone Church in London without her father or his mother present. Reportedly, the Duke's mother did not believe reports of the marriage and "envinced extreme displeasure at the idea of her son marrying Miss Zimmerman." In 1903, her father bought them Kylemore Castle in Connemara, Ireland. In addition, the Manchesters owned a house in London, a country estate known as Kimbolton Castle and Tandragee Castle in Northern Ireland. In 1906, he was a Privy Councillor and from 1906 to 1907, he was a Captain of the Yeomen of the Guard. From their marriage, she was the mother of four, including:

- Lady Mary Alice Montagu (1901–1962), who married Fendall Littlepage Gregory of Cuernavaca in 1949.
- Alexander Montagu, 10th Duke of Manchester (1902–1977), who married an Australian, Nell Vere Stead in 1927. After her death in 1966, he married the American Elizabeth (née Fullerton) Coleman Crocker (1913–2007) in 1969.
- Lord Edward Eugene Fernando Montagu (1906–1954), who married Norah Macfarlane Potter, a daughter of Albert Edward Potter, in 1929. They divorced in 1937 and he remarried to Dorothy Vera Peters in 1937. They divorced in 1947 and he married Martha Bowen the same year. After her death in 1951, he married Baroness Cora Kellie in 1952. His fifth marriage was to Roberta Herold Joughlin in 1953.
- Lady Ellen Millicent Louise Montagu (1908–1948), who married Herman Martin Hofer, second son of John Jacob Hofer of Zürich, in 1936. They divorced in 1944 and she married Maj. John Norman Shairp, son of Col. Alexander Shairp, in 1945.

The Duke's family, long prominent in British society and politics had little wealth left despite a $1,000,000 trust left for him by his mother (which she inherited from her brother, the banker Fernando Yznaga). This was compounded by the Duke's profligate gambling and spending on other women. In 1920, because of the Duke's gambling debts, they were forced to sell Kylemore Castle to Benedictine nuns who established a monastery on the grounds. Helena's father gave her a fixed allowance, and was careful to set up his will so the Duke received nothing. Her father died in Cincinnati in December 1914 leaving an estate valued at $10,000,000 in trust. By 1918, sixty-six petitions of bankruptcy had been filed against the Duke in the English courts.

After rumors in 1908, and separation proceedings in 1915, 1921, and 1925 (when it was announced an estrangement had existed since 1914), they were eventually divorced in December 1931 after the Duke absconded to Cuba in November to apply for a divorce there. He remarried almost immediately to another American, the former actress Kathleen Dawes of Connecticut. The Duke died in Seaford, Sussex in February 1947.

=== Second marriage ===
On 23 November 1937, The Duchess of Manchester remarried to Arthur Keith-Falconer, 10th Earl of Kintore. Lord Kintore, the second son of Algernon Keith-Falconer, 9th Earl of Kintore (the Governor of South Australia in the 1890s) and the former Lady Sydney Montagu (second daughter of George Montagu, 6th Duke of Manchester), fought in the Boer War between 1900 and 1902 with the Cameron Highlanders with the Scots Guard during World War I.

Lord Kintore died in London on 26 May 1966. As they had no children together, her husband's older sister, Lady Ethel Sydney Keith-Falconer (the wife of John Baird, 1st Viscount Stonehaven) became the suo jure 11th Countess of Kintore. The Dowager Countess of Kintore died at Keith Hall in Inverurie on 15 December 1971 and was buried alongside her second husband at the Keith Hall Burial Ground in Inverurie.

=== Descendants ===
Through her eldest son, she was a grandmother of Sidney Montagu, 11th Duke of Manchester (1929–1985), who married twice but died without issue, and Angus Montagu, 12th Duke of Manchester (1938–2002), who married four times and had three children. Through her second son, she was a grandmother of Roderick Edward Drogo Montagu.

== Gallery ==
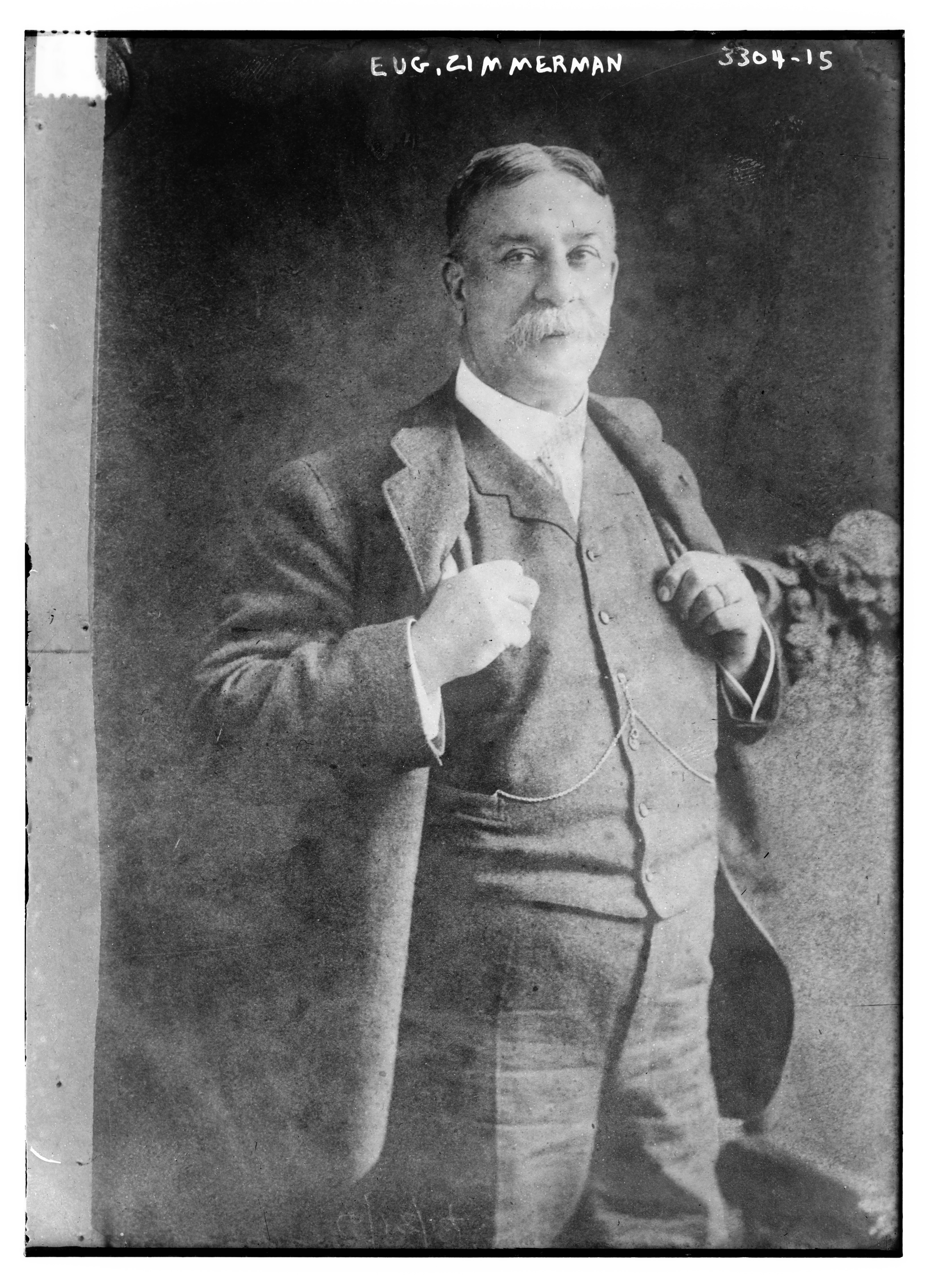
Her father, Eugene Zimmerman, 1910.

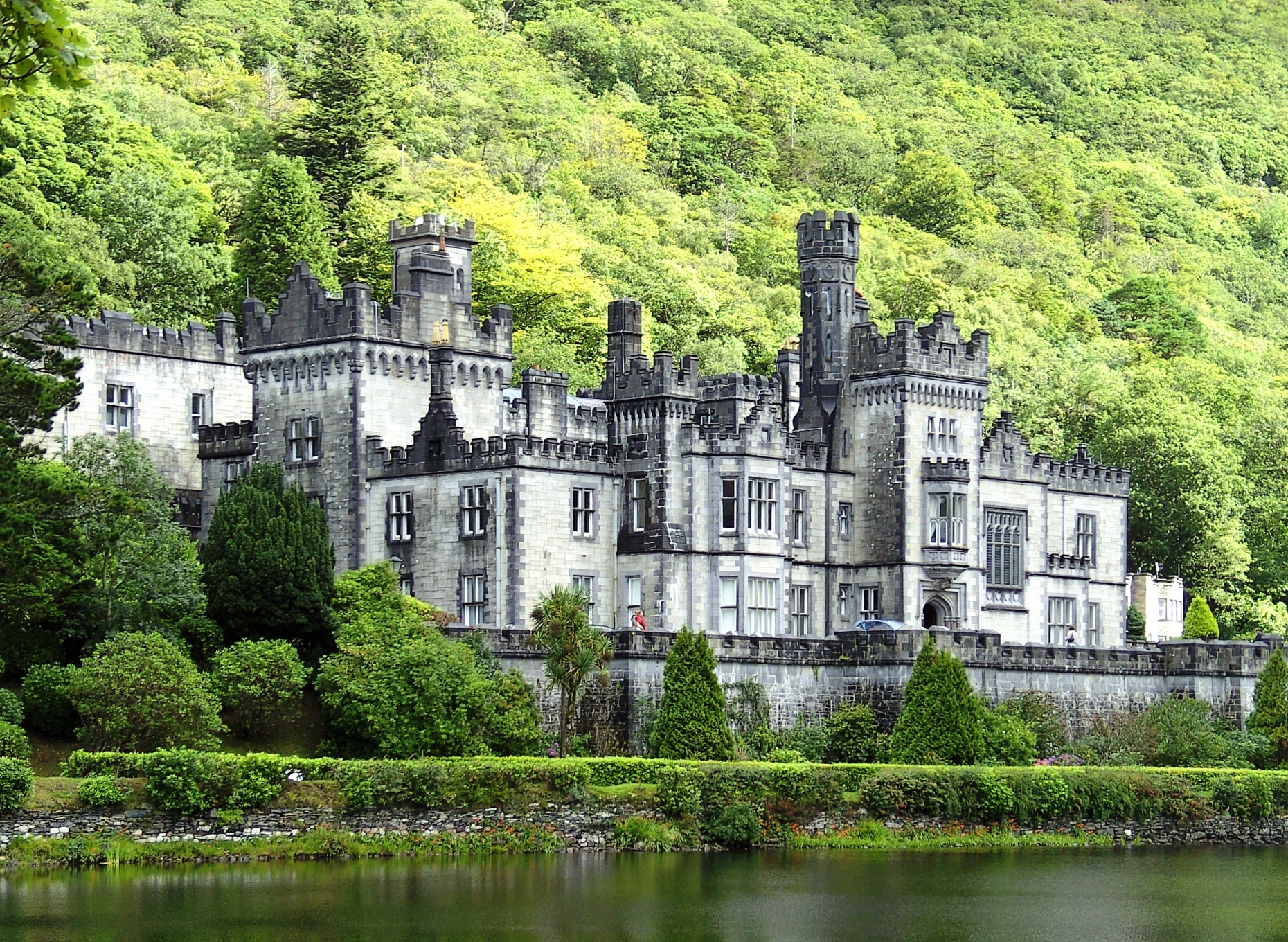
Kylemore Castle in Connemara, Ireland.

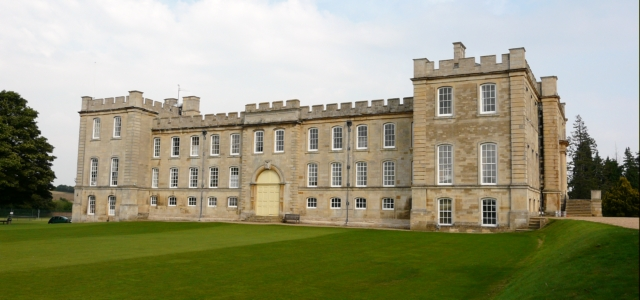
Kimbolton Castle, Huntingdonshire, the principal seat of the Dukes of Manchester.

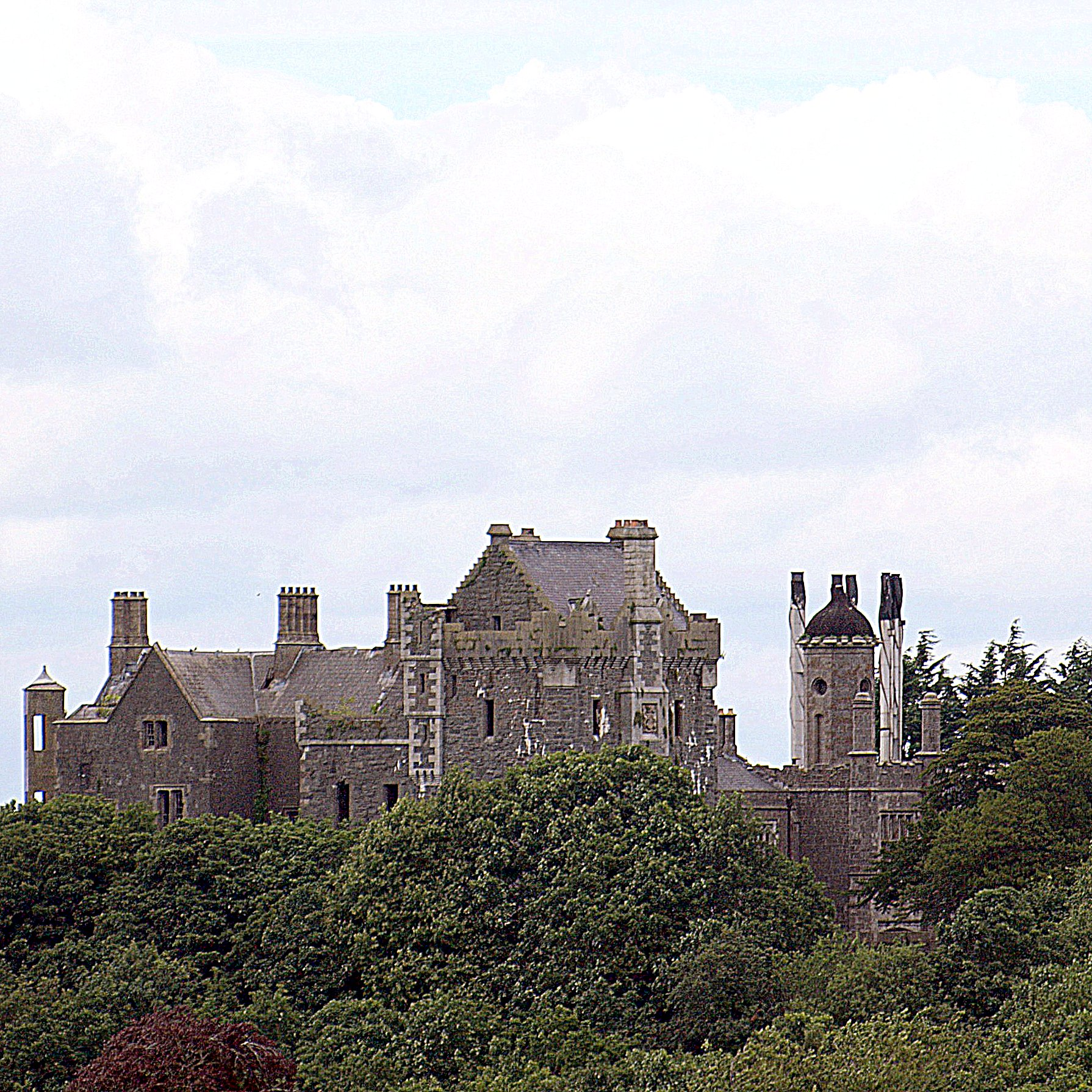
Tandragee Castle in Tandragee, County Armagh, in Ulster.

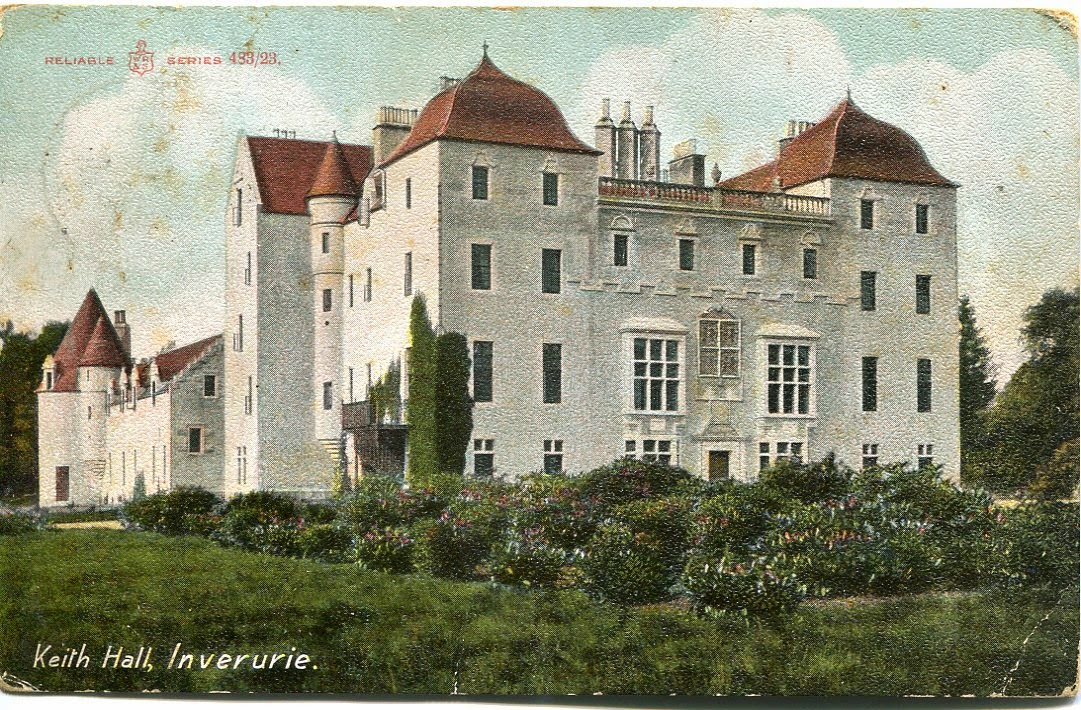
Keith Hall in Inverurie, Aberdeenshire, Scotland.

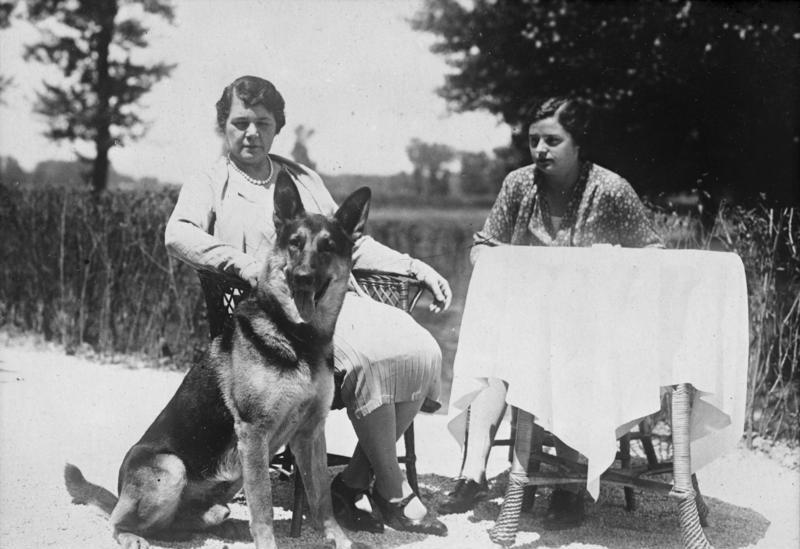
The Duchess and one of her daughters, 1930.

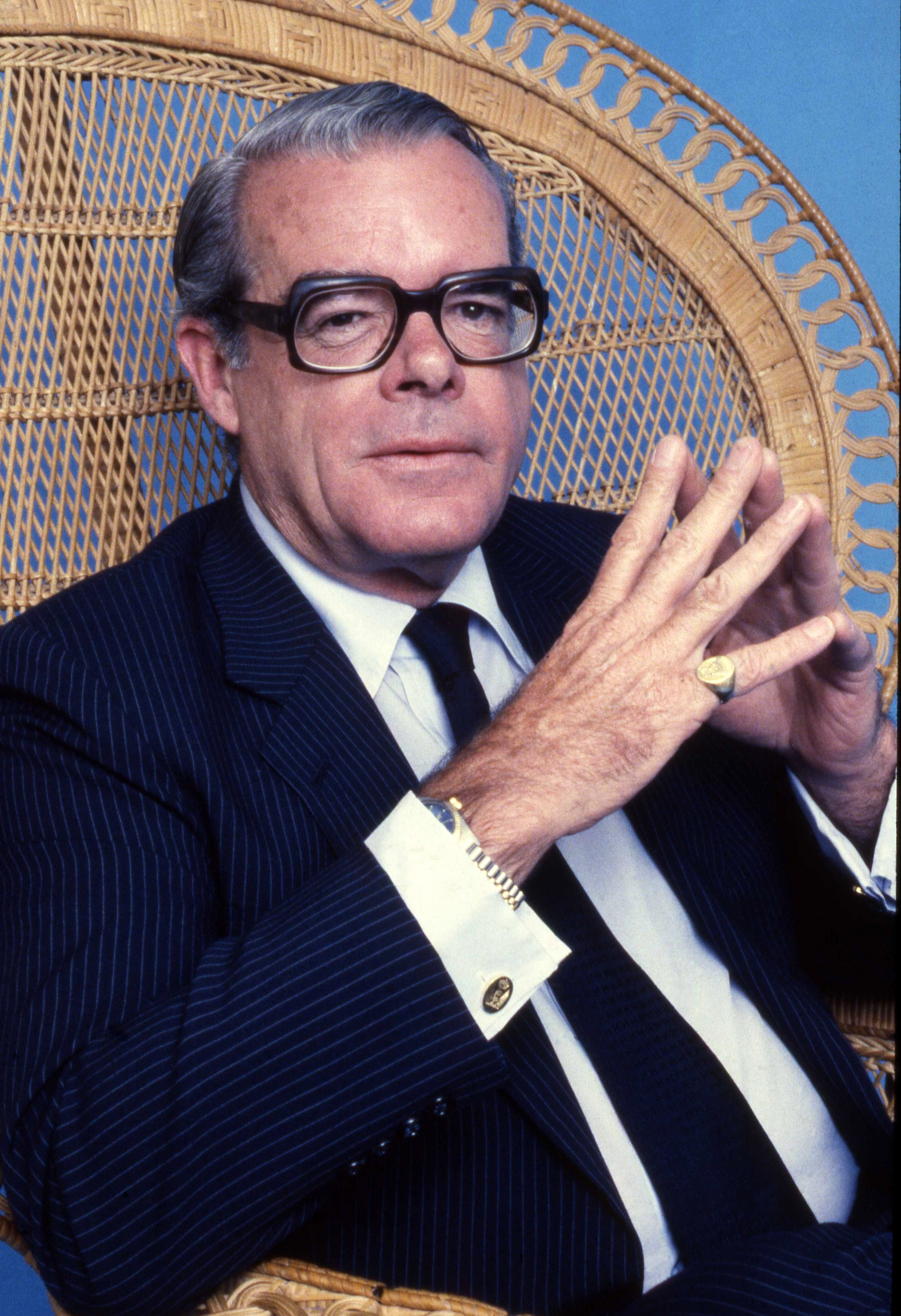
Her grandson, The 11th Duke of Manchester, by Allan Warren, 1981
