= Arthur Keith-Falconer, 10th Earl of Kintore =

British soldier and aristocrat

The Right Honourable The Earl of Kintore

Personal details
- Born: Arthur George Keith-Falconer; 5 January 1879 Inverurie, Aberdeenshire, Scotland
- Died: 26 May 1966 (aged 87) London, England
- Spouse: Helena Montagu (m. 1937)
- Parent(s): Algernon Keith-Falconer, 9th Earl of Kintore; Lady Sydney Montagu
- Relatives: George Montagu, 6th Duke of Manchester (grandfather)

Arthur George Keith-Falconer, 10th Earl of Kintore (5 January 1879 – 26 May 1966), was a British soldier and aristocrat.

== Early life ==
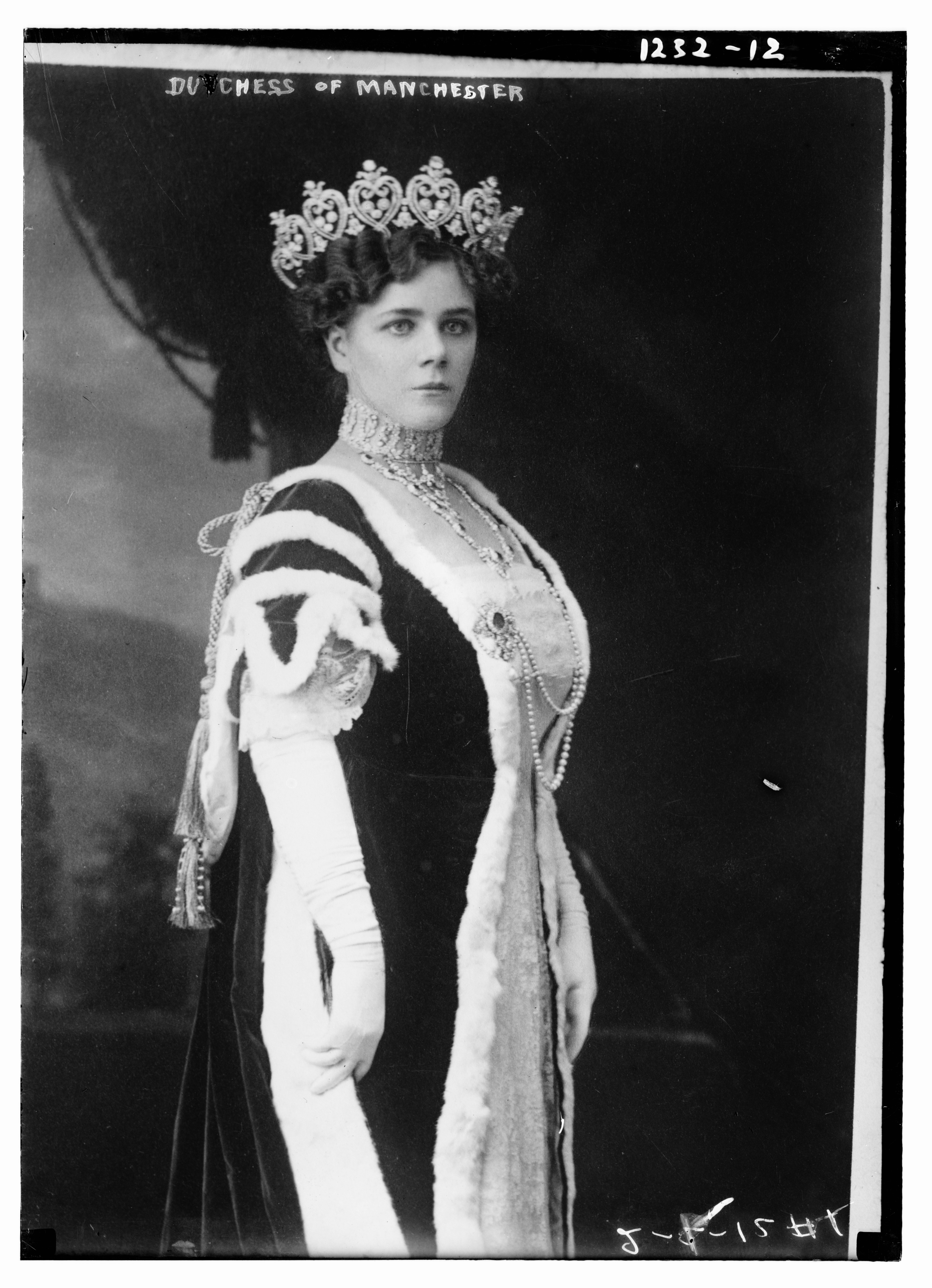
His wife Helena, when she was the Duchess of Manchester.

Arthur George Keith-Falconer was born on 5 January 1879 in Inverurie in Aberdeenshire, Scotland. He was the second son, and youngest child, of Algernon Keith-Falconer, 9th Earl of Kintore and the former Lady Sydney Charlotte Montagu. His older brother was Ian Douglas Montagu Keith-Falconer, Lord Keith of Inverurie and Keith Hall, who died at age twenty in 1897, predeceasing their father. His father was a prominent politician who served in various roles, including Conservative Chief Whip in the Lords in the 1880s and Governor of South Australia in the 1890s.

His mother was the second daughter of George Montagu, 6th Duke of Manchester and the former Harriet Sydney Dobbs. His paternal grandparents were Francis Falconer, 8th Earl of Kintore and his wife Louisa Madeleine (née Hawkins) Falconer.

== Career ==
Lord Kintore fought in the Boer War between 1900 and 1902 with the Cameron Highlanders. During World War I, he fought with the Scots Guard (Special Reserves) achieving the rank of captain.

== Personal life ==
On 23 November 1937, Lord Kintore married the American heiress Helena Montagu, Duchess of Manchester (1878–1971). Helena, the only child of Eugene Zimmerman of Cincinnati, Ohio (a railroad president and major stockholder in Standard Oil), was the divorced wife of the 9th Duke of Manchester. From her first marriage, she was the mother of four, including the 10th Duke of Manchester.

Lord Kintore died in London on 26 May 1966, and was buried at Keithhall Burial Ground in Inverurie. On his death the Barony of Kintore became extinct and the Lordship of Falconer of Halkerton became dormant. His older sister, Lady Ethel Sydney Keith-Falconer (the wife of the 1st Viscount Stonehaven), became the suo jure 11th Countess of Kintore. After her death at the age of 100, her son inherited the Earldom becoming Ian, 12th Earl of Kintore. His widow died in 1971.

Peerage of Scotland
Preceded by Algernon Keith-Falconer	Earl of Kintore; 1930–1966	Succeeded by Ethel Sydney Keith-Falconer
Preceded by Algernon Keith-Falconer	Lord Falconer of Halkerton; 1930–1966	Dormant
Peerage of the United Kingdom
Preceded by Algernon Keith-Falconer	Baron Kintore; 1930–1966	Extinct
