= Yosemite, Kentucky =

Yosemite
- Unincorporated community
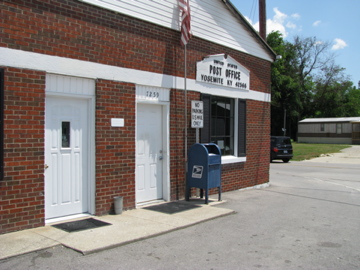
- Post office in Yosemite, Kentucky

- Location within the state of Kentucky Yosemite (the United States)
- Coordinates: 37°20′48″N 84°49′29″W
- Country: United States
- State: Kentucky
- County: Casey
- Elevation: 840 ft (260 m)
- Time zone: UTC-5 (Eastern (EST))
  - Summer (DST): UTC-4 (EST)
- ZIP codes: 42566
- GNIS feature ID: 507236

Yosemite is an unincorporated community in eastern Casey County, Kentucky, United States. Their Post Office was closed in September 2011. It was established in the 1870s for logging facilities owned by Cincinnati businessman Eugene Zimmerman. It was named by his daughter Helena, who said the hilly area reminded her of the Yosemite valley in California.

Locals in the area pronounce the town "YO-suh-MITE", differing from the California pronunciation.
