= Eugene Zimmerman (industrialist) =

American industrialist and railroad owner

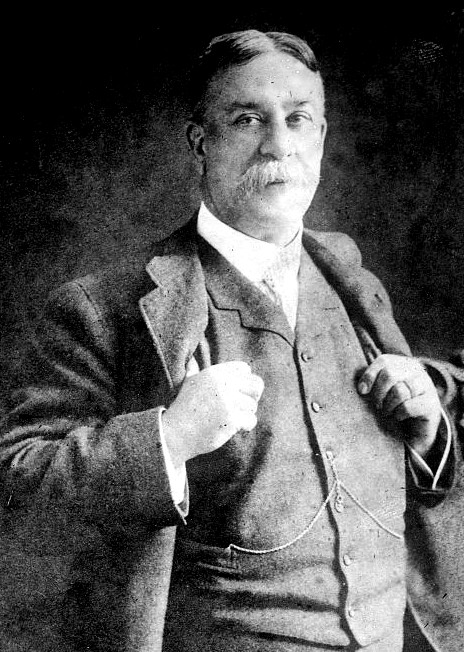

President of the Detroit, Toledo and Ironton Railroad and Ann Arbor Railroad
- In office November 1905 – 1909
- Preceded by: F. A. Durban
- Succeeded by: Joseph Ramsey Jr.

President of the Cincinnati, Hamilton and Dayton Railway
- In office 1904 – October 1905

Personal details
- Born: December 17, 1845 Vicksburg, Mississippi, US
- Died: December 20, 1914 (aged 69) Cincinnati, Ohio, US
- Spouse: Marietta A. Evans (m. 1878; died 1882)
- Children: Helena Keith-Falconer, Countess of Kintore
- Relatives: Alexander Montagu, 10th Duke of Manchester (grandson)
- Education: Farmer's College

Military service
- Allegiance: Union
- Branch/service: Union Navy
- Rank: Commander
- Battles/wars: U.S. Civil War: • Battle of Saint Charles • Arkansas Post • Vicksburg campaign

Eugene Zimmerman (December 17, 1845 – December 20, 1914) was an American industrialist and railroad owner. He amassed great wealth as a stockholder or shareholder in John D. Rockefeller's Standard Oil. He used the income from his Standard Oil holdings to invest in railroads.

== Early life ==
Zimmerman was born in Vicksburg, Mississippi, on December 17, 1845. He was son of Solomon Zimmerman and wife Hannah J. Biggs, and paternal grandson of Martin Zimmerman and wife Barbara Pontius. His younger brother was Martin Zimmerman and his younger sister was Ellen (née Zimmerman) Laird. After his father's death, his mother remarried to Andrew Jackson LaBoiteaux in November 1859 in Hamilton County, Ohio, before her death in 1861. His grandfather was an officer in the Dutch Army.

His father had moved to Mississippi from Ohio to inherit a foundry and several slaves. Eugene grew up at the family's business and was sent to Cincinnati in 1859 to attend Farmer's College. In the spring of 1861, he began attending the preparatory school Gambier Academy with the intention of attending Kenyon College.

== Career ==
Upon the outbreak of the Civil War, Zimmerman left the academy and tried to join the Union Navy, but was refused because he was too young. After some modifications, he was accepted, becoming a Master's mate and was assigned to the Mississippi River Squadron. While in the Navy, his ship was struck by torpedo which killed several seamen and threw him into the Yazoo River. He participated in the Battle of Saint Charles and Duvall's Bluffs and served with distinction during the capture of Arkansas Post in 1863, after which he was promoted to Ensign. During the Vicksburg campaign in his hometown, Zimmerman was placed in charge of a mortar boat and sent up the Yazoo River, making a successful run against the Confederate blockade at Vicksburg in April 1863. During the campaign, he was involved in several missions and was promoted to acting Master and Officer of the side wheel steamer USS Ouachita after the surrender of Vicksburg which he held until the end of the War. During the siege, his former home and his father's business were destroyed.

During the remainder of the war, he was eventually made a Lieutenant and a ship commander at the age of nineteen (the youngest officer at his rank in the entire U.S. Navy). After the War, he resigned his commission, was honorably discharged, and returned to Ohio.

=== Business career ===
After the war, he went into the oil business, acquiring extensive holdings which he sold to John D. Rockefeller in exchange for shares in Standard Oil where he became a substantial stockholder and gained seat on the company's board.

In 1875, Zimmerman purchased more than 13,000 acres of timberland in what is now Yosemite in Casey County, Kentucky. He ran a lumber mill there and built a wooden train track from Kings Mountain to Staffordsville in 1884, later organizing the Green River Railway Co. He used his income to invest in railroads and was president of the Cincinnati and Green River Railroad, and the Kentucky and South Atlantic Railroad, which later became a part of the Chesapeake and Ohio Railway after he sold it to Collis P. Huntington which led to a long partnership with Huntington, including looking after his interests in the Midwest. In 1882, he became president of the Chesapeake and Nashville Railway (and constructed the Chesapeake and Ohio Bridge at Cincinnati for Huntington), and in 1888 he was elected president of Dayton, Forth Wayne and Chicago Railway.

In 1904, he was made president of the Cincinnati, Hamilton and Dayton Railway, and succeeded in getting the Queen and Crescent as its tributary and gaining control of the Père Marquette system, and the Chicago, Cincinnati and St. Louis Railroad. George M. Cumming, a lawyer with the United States Mortgage and Trust Company of New York, was elected vice president to represent the interest of New York capital. In 1906, along with his son-in-law, he toured the route of the proposed Newry, Keady Tynan Railway in Ireland to see whether to build a railway there. In June 1905, Cumming was elected president of the Detroit, Toledo and Ironton Railroad and served for one month; he was succeeded by F. A. Durban who was elected president in July 1905 but resigned in November, and was replaced by Zimmerman. The Detroit, Toledo & Ironton Railway had taken control of the Ann Arbor Railroad from Rudolph Kleybolte & Co. in June 1905. The acquisition connected Toledo with Frankfort, Michigan, and essentially doubled the DT&I system. The DT&I went bankrupt in 1908, forcing them to divest Ann Arbor Railroad to Zimmerman, who sold the line in 1909 to Joseph Ramsey, Jr. and Newman Erb, and retired from active business while still retaining control of his "immense coal and iron lands" in the Midwest. He continued to be a director of Cincinnati, Indianapolis and Western Railway, the Birmingham and Atlantic Railway and the North Alabama Coal and Iron Company. Henry Ford later bought DT&I in 1920.

At the time of his death, he was preparing to testify before Commissioner Henry Clay Hall of the Interstate Commerce Commission regarding the sale of the Cincinnati, Hamilton and Dayton Railroad and the Père Marquette to J.P. Morgan & Co., for which Zimmerman made a profit of more than $1,000,000. Testimony given before the Commission told how J. Pierpont Morgan suffered a $12,00,000 loss when he acquired the Zimmerman's Great Central system, then failed to sell it to the Erie Railroad, and "was forced to throw the system into the hands of a receiver." Frederick W. Stevens testified that Zimmerman and his associates loaded $24,000,000 worth of obligations on the railroad and took a 999-year lease on the Père Marquette system and guaranteed the road's bonds.

In his later years, he traveled through Europe and Africa. In 1901, he sailed aboard the Cunard Umbria with Miss B. Evans, his late wife's sister, for a month in Ireland with his daughter at Tandragee Castle in Northern Ireland.

== Personal life ==
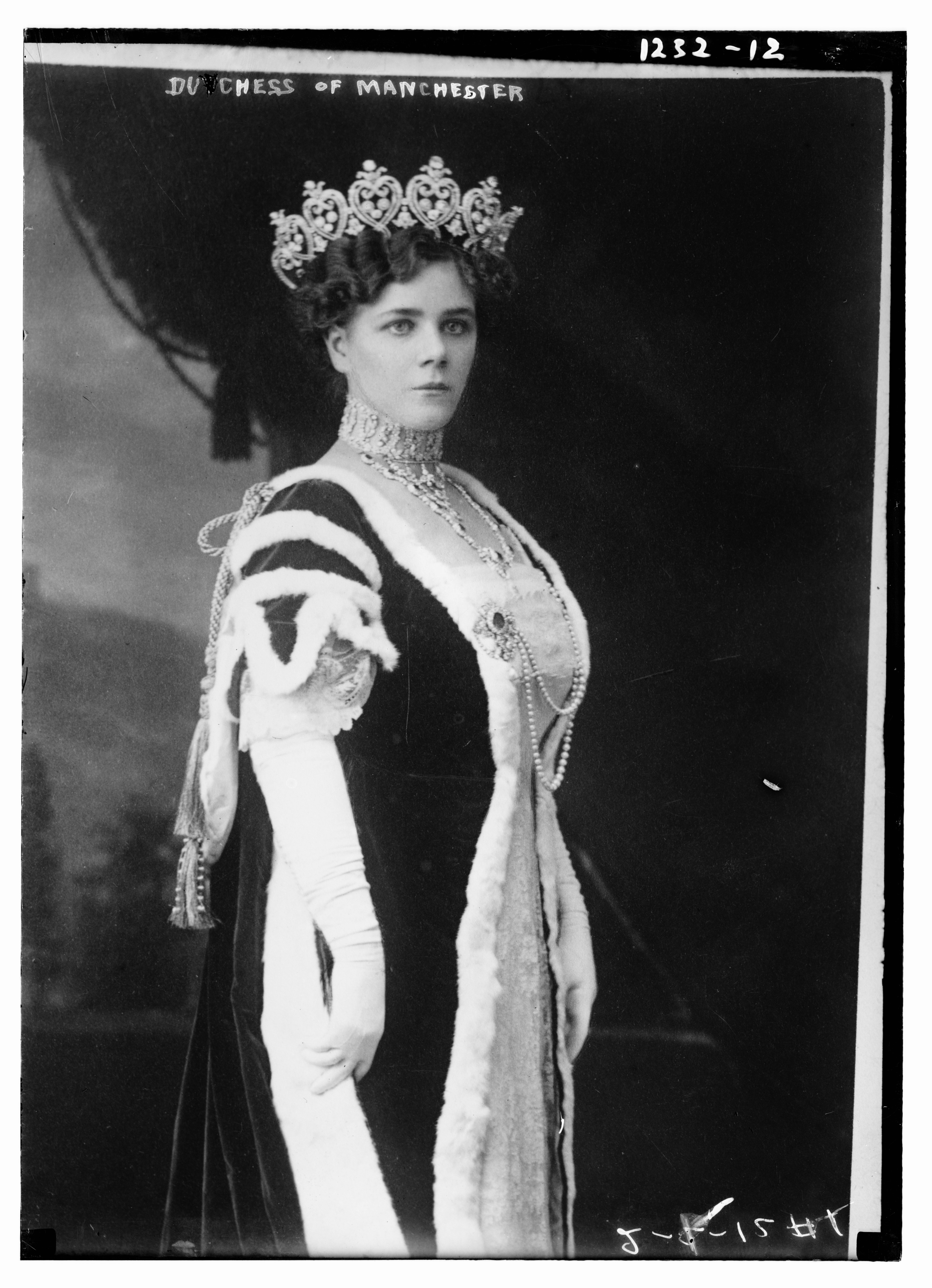
His daughter Helena, when she was the Duchess of Manchester, 1912

In 1878, Zimmerman was married to Marietta A. "Etta" Evans, a daughter of Abraham Evans of West Liberty, and wife Elizabeth Igou, daughter of Peter Igou, farmer, and wife Susan McKenzie. Before her death in December 1882 from peritonitis, they were the parents of one child together: Helena Zimmerman. Helena, married the then Duke of Manchester. After losing her beloved twin daughters and a difficult time with her husband, she sought separation from the Duke. They divorced in 1931 and, in 1937, she married Arthur Keith-Falconer, 10th Earl of Kintore and remained married until his death in 1966.

Zimmerman lived at 2448 Auburn Avenue, the southeast corner of Auburn and McMillan in Mount Auburn, an affluent neighborhood in Cincinnati, Ohio, and was a member of the Loyal Legion, the Lotos Club, the American Yacht Club, and the Queen City Club of Cincinnati. He died at the Queen City Club on December 20, 1914. A few minutes before his death, he had been laughing over a $100,000 breach of promise suit filed against him in New York by Icy Wareham the previous June. Reportedly, Wareham, a dog fancier from Elmhurst on Long Island, alleged Zimmerman promised to marry her on December 30, 1913, and she was ready to marry him still. After his daughter returned to Ohio from Europe, he was buried at Spring Grove Cemetery in Cincinnati. He left an estate valued at $10,000,000 in trust. From the beginning of his daughter's marriage, the Duke had financial difficulties and was known as a profligate gambler who spent lavishly on other women. In 1908, Zimmerman paid off the Duke's debts but made them in the form of payments for the purchase of various Manchester estates (including Kimbolton Castle, Kylemore Castle and Tandragee Castle), which were held for his grandson, Viscount Mandeville. By 1918, sixty-six petitions of bankruptcy had been filed against his son-in-law in the English courts. After becoming estranged in 1914, the Duke and Duchess eventually divorced in 1931. His only child, the Dowager Countess of Kintore, died at Keith Hall in Inverurie on 15 December 1971 and was buried alongside her second husband at the Keith Hall Burial Ground in Inverurie.

=== Descendants ===
Through his daughter Helena, he was the grandfather of four, including Lady Mary Alice Montagu; Alexander Montagu, 10th Duke of Manchester; Lord Edward Eugene Fernando Montagu; and Lady Ellen Millicent Louise Montagu.
