= Detroit, Toledo and Ironton Railroad =

Former US railway (1905–1983)

- DT&I system before merger with the Ann Arbor Railroad

Overview
- Reporting mark: DTI
- Locale: Michigan and Ohio
- Dates of operation: 1905–1983
- Successor: Canadian National Railway, Grand Trunk Western

Technical
- Track gauge: 4 ft 8 1/2 in (1,435 mm) standard gauge

The Detroit, Toledo and Ironton Railroad (reporting mark DTI) operated from 1905 to 1983 between its namesake cities of Detroit, Michigan, and Ironton, Ohio, via Toledo. At the end of 1970, it operated 478 miles of road on 762 miles of track; that year it carried 1,244 million ton-miles of revenue freight.

== Early history ==
D&LN logo

old DT&I Railroad map

In 1901, the merger of the Detroit and Lima Northern Railway and the Ohio Southern Railway formed the Detroit Southern Railroad. This company was purchased at foreclosure on May 1, 1905, by Harry B. Hollins & Company of New York, which reincorporated it in the state of Michigan under the name of the Detroit, Toledo & Ironton Railway.

The president of the Detroit Southern, Samuel Hunt, was to remain as president of the reorganized road but died suddenly on May 15, 1905. He was followed by two short-term presidents: George Miller Cumming (a New York City lawyer who was a former first vice-president of the Erie Railroad and the former chairman of the board of the Cincinnati, Hamilton & Dayton Railway) was elected in June and served for one month, after which F. A. Durban was elected in July and resigned in November. The next president was Eugene Zimmerman, under whom Cumming and Durban continued to serve as officers.

The name was changed to Detroit, Toledo and Ironton Railroad on March 1, 1914.

Though the company went bankrupt in 1908, it remained solvent until it was purchased by Henry Ford in 1920. Ford recognized the strategic importance of the line to his automobile business; the line connected Dearborn, Michigan, to all of the major east–west rail lines in the Midwest. This gave Ford direct control over shipments of raw materials and finished goods to and from his factories in Dearborn.

Under Ford's management, the line thrived. In the words of a later historian, "the line was transformed from a streak of rust into an extremely efficient and profitable operation, the likes of which has or will seldom be seen in this country." Ford double-tracked the Detroit area main lines, and made a deal with the workers that they would take better care of the equipment in exchange for unusually high wages. Moreover, Ford funded the purchase of new equipment. For the daily Detroit-Bainbridge, Ohio train, the DT&I purchased a pair of "doodlebugs"; for the intensive Detroit-area freight service, the line electrified as far as Flat Rock yard. Ford hoped to electrify the entire line, and thence to an interchange with the Virginian, but electrified at 22 kV 25 Hz AC, the wrong voltage for interoperable equipment (the Virginian electrified at 11 kV AC). The concrete catenary masts of the electric years survived for decades after de-electrification, as it was deemed too expensive to demolish them; some remain today.

In 1929, Ford sold the line to a subsidiary of the Pennsylvania Railroad after becoming disgusted with what he considered interference and over-regulation from the Interstate Commerce Commission. In 1930, the railroad de-electrified in favor of standard equipment.

== Ann Arbor Railroad ==
In June 1905, the Detroit, Toledo & Ironton Railway took control of the Ann Arbor Railroad (AA), which they purchased from Rudolph Kleybolte & Co. The acquisition connected Toledo with Frankfort, Michigan, and essentially doubled the DT&I system. But the 1908 bankruptcy forced the DT&I to divest its acquisition.

In 1963, the DT&I, by then a subsidiary of the Pennsylvania Railroad, once again gained control of the AA. The Ann Arbor lines became part of Conrail in April 1976, and were facing abandonment. In October 1977, they were purchased by the state of Michigan, which intended to preserve rail service over its tracks. In 1977 Michigan Interstate was designated operator of the entire line from Toledo to Frankfurt. A series of disputes arose during the early 1980s and multiple railroads were designated by the tracks owners, the State of Michigan, to operate the line. The line from Toledo to just south of Osmer (a passing siding north of Ann Arbor) was sold to the trustee for the estate purchased the remaining portion of the Michigan Interstate from Toledo, Ohio to Ann Arbor, Michigan in September 1985. The line north of Osmer remains under the ownership of the State of Michigan, except where the tracks have been removed. For a period in the 1980s three different companies operated the Ann Arbor tracks. Michigan Interstate operated from Toledo to Osmer. Tuscola and Saginaw Bay from Osmer north to Alma, and the Michigan Northern operated north of Alma. The collapse of the Michigan Northern resulted in the Tuscola and Saginaw Bay taking all operations north of Osmer. The Tuscola and Saginaw Bay later re-branded itself as the Great Lakes Central, the current operator of all remaining lines north of Osmer. The Michigan Interstate trackage was sold in 1988 to the Ann Arbor Acquisition Corporation, who later sold the line to WATCO, the current operator the segment from Toledo to Osmer.

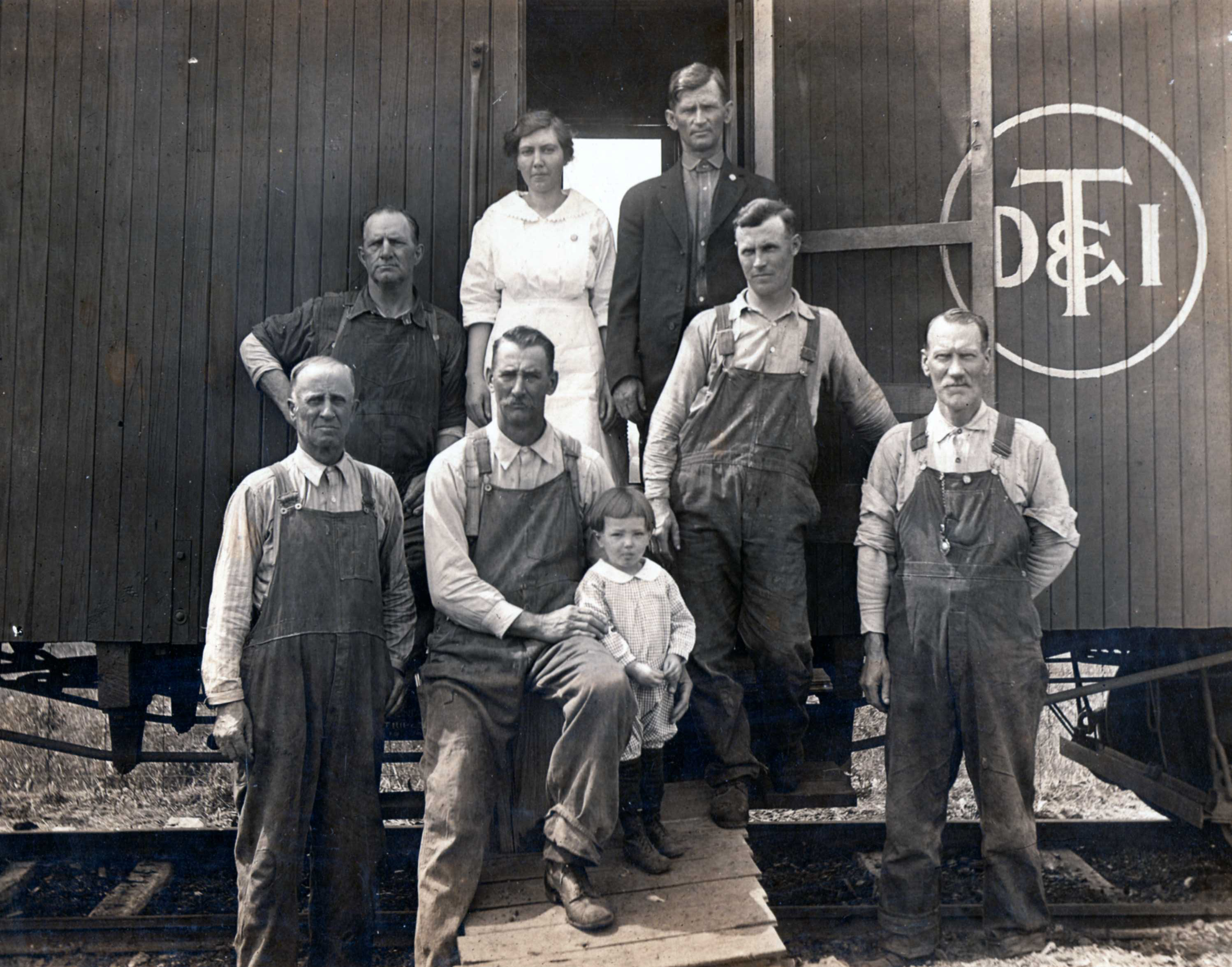
Work Train, circa 1921

== The Pennsylvania years ==
The line operated as an independent subsidiary of the Pennsylvania Railroad from 1929 until 1970. In 1955, the line replaced its steam locomotives with diesel locomotives. The DT&I relied exclusively on diesel locomotives built by General Motors Electro-Motive Division.

== The later years ==
In 1968, the DT&I's parent company, the Pennsylvania Railroad, merged with its longtime rival, the New York Central Railroad, to become the Penn Central, which declared bankruptcy two years later and sold off the DT&I to private investors. In 1980, the DT&I was acquired by the Grand Trunk Western Railroad (GTW). Under the GTW, the DT&I locomotives were painted in the red and blue livery of the GTW, but retained the DT&I logo. In December 1983, the DT&I was completely assimilated into the GTW.

== End of service on southern portion ==
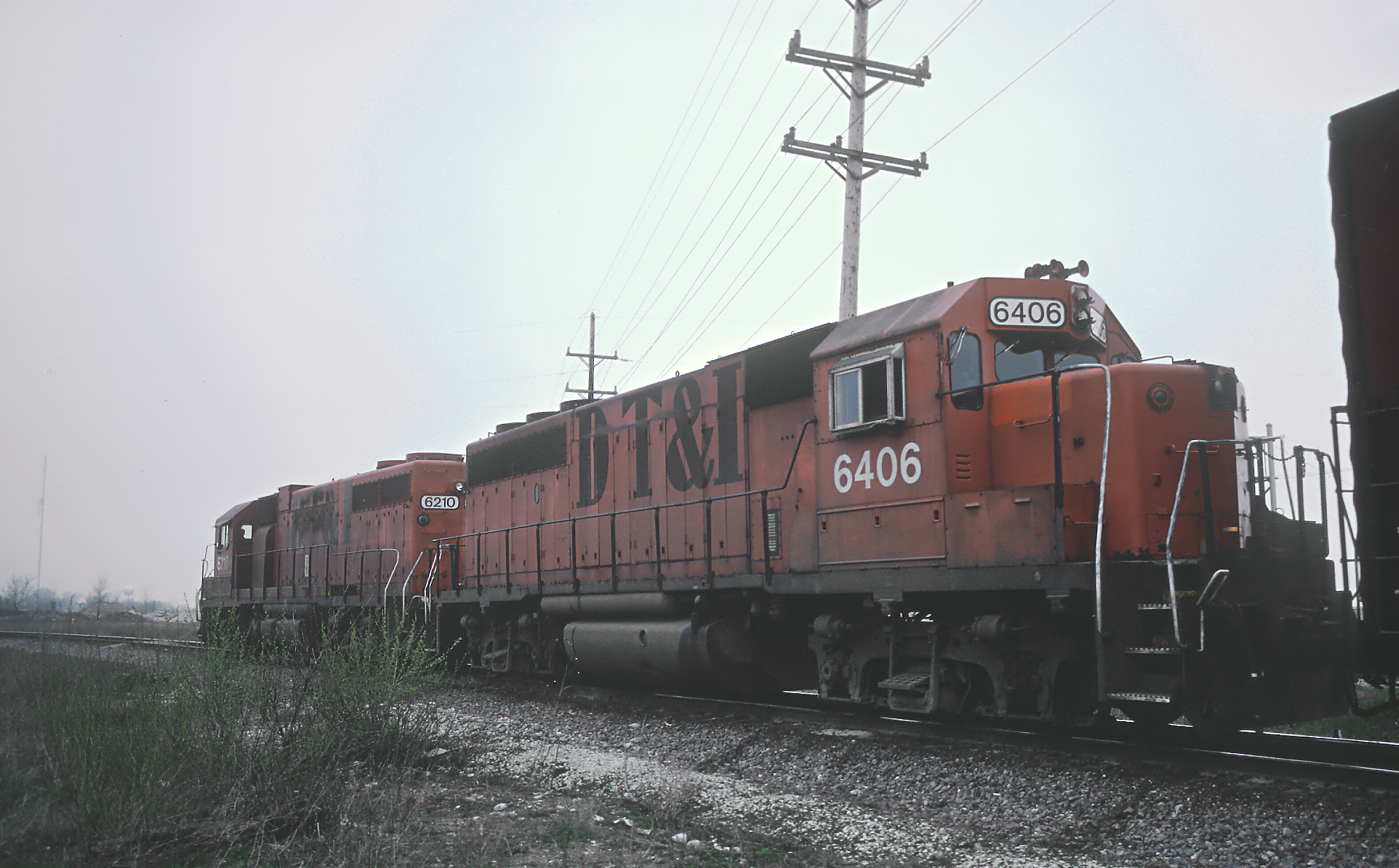
Detroit, Toledo and Ironton at CP Hill in Melrose Park in April 1985

In April 1982, a collapse in Royersville Tunnel (the only tunnel on the old DT&I) prompted GTW to shut down the line between Jackson and Ironton. The tunnel had suffered collapses many times in the past but limited remaining business south of Jackson and the operational problems of the tunnel led to GTW's decision. At the same time, GTW bypassed the steep and treacherous Summithill section between Bainbridge and Waverly by rerouting trains onto Chessie System trackage from Washington Court House, Ohio to Waverly, then back onto the former DT&I to Jackson. In 1984 all operations south of Waverly and the C&O interchange at Glenn Jean ended with the closing of the Jackson Shops and abandonment of the remaining tracks from Glenn Jean to Jackson. GTW continued to operate to Waverly and Glenn Jean and in May of 1985 was forced to buy 10 miles of the B&O just outside of Washington CH South to Frankfort. The beginning of the end occurred in September of 1986 when a bridge outside of Chillicothe on the former B&O Renick Sub failed. The resulting detour around the bridge and the impending abandonment of the former B&O they used south of Washington CH to reach Chillicothe, GTW decided to end service south of Washington CH in March of 1987. Traffic to Waverly and Glenn Jean the last 12-18 months of service had shrank to coke off of NS and occasional unit coal trains off of CSX. The cost of purchase any of the former B&O up for abandonment wasn’t worth the cost.

A short section of the DT&I main west out of Jackson is still in place serving as a connection from industries to the only remaining line into Jackson. A short section of the DT&I north from the junction with the B&O Southwestern near Greenfield is still in place to serve local industry. Portions of the line between Greenfield and Washington Court House were purchased by Washington Court House with the intention of creating a rail-trail, but they were unable to acquire enough conjoined sections to build a trail.

== Central and northern portions ==
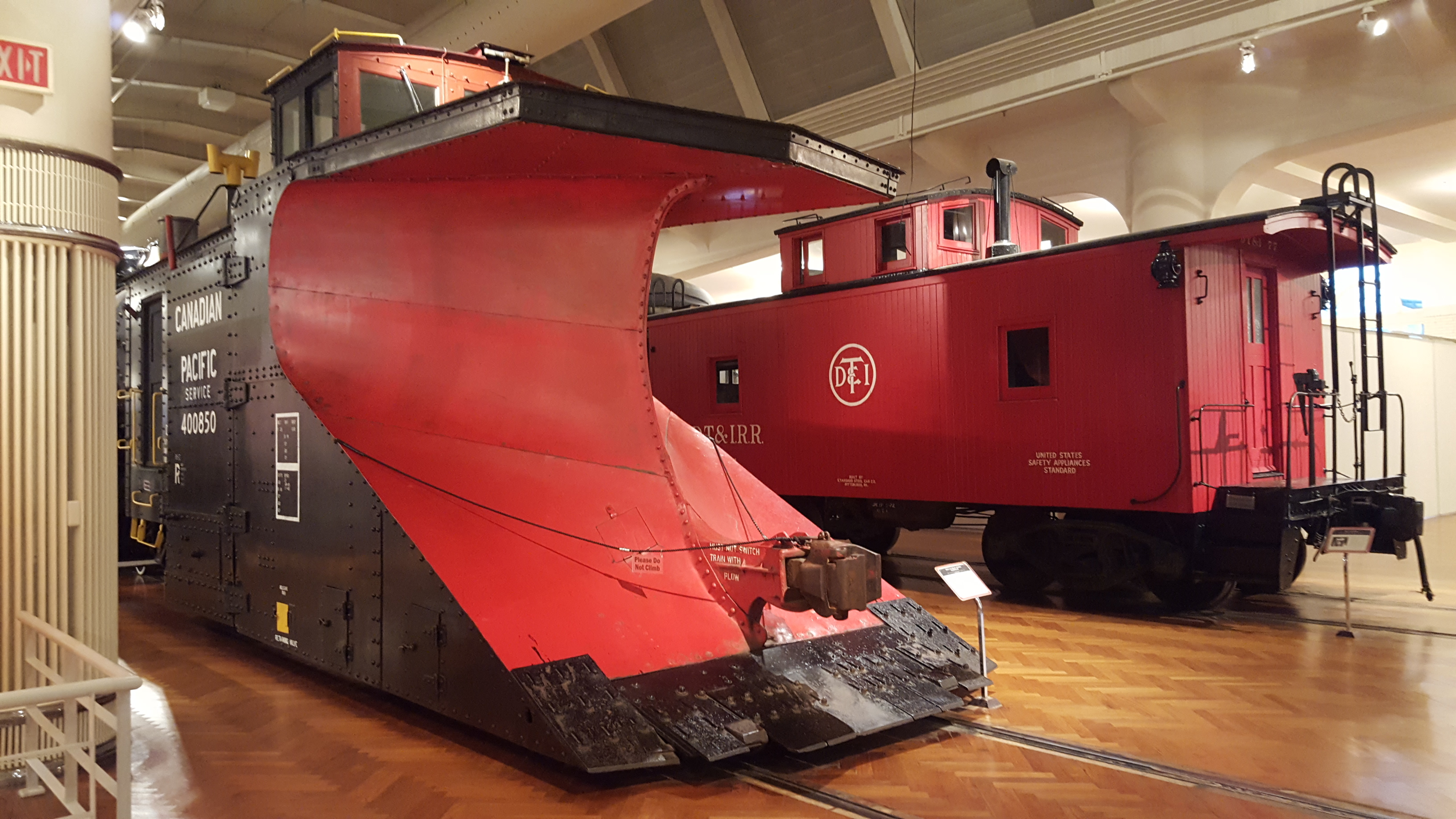
1925 DT & I RR caboose on display at Henry Ford Museum

GTW continued to operate the northern and central portions of the former DT&I as part of their network for many years. The DT&I trackage from Springfield to Lurray (near Washington Court House) was sold by GTW to the West Central Ohio Port Authority (formerly Clark County - Fayette County Port Authority) January 18, 1991. This section was then operated in conjunction with the former section of the B&O Toledo Division from Lurray to Washington Court House by the Indiana and Ohio Railway, a division of Railtex. In 1997, GTW sold the former DT&I from Dundee (Diann) Michigan to Springfield, Ohio to the Indiana and Ohio Railway. Included in the sale was trackage rights from Dundee to Flat Rock, MI over the old DT&I. Railtex was merged into RailAmerica, which was then purchased by Genesee & Wyoming. G&W operates the former DT&I from Dundee (Diann) Michigan to Washington Court House, still as part of their Indiana and Ohio Railway.

== Cities and towns along the Detroit, Toledo and Ironton ==
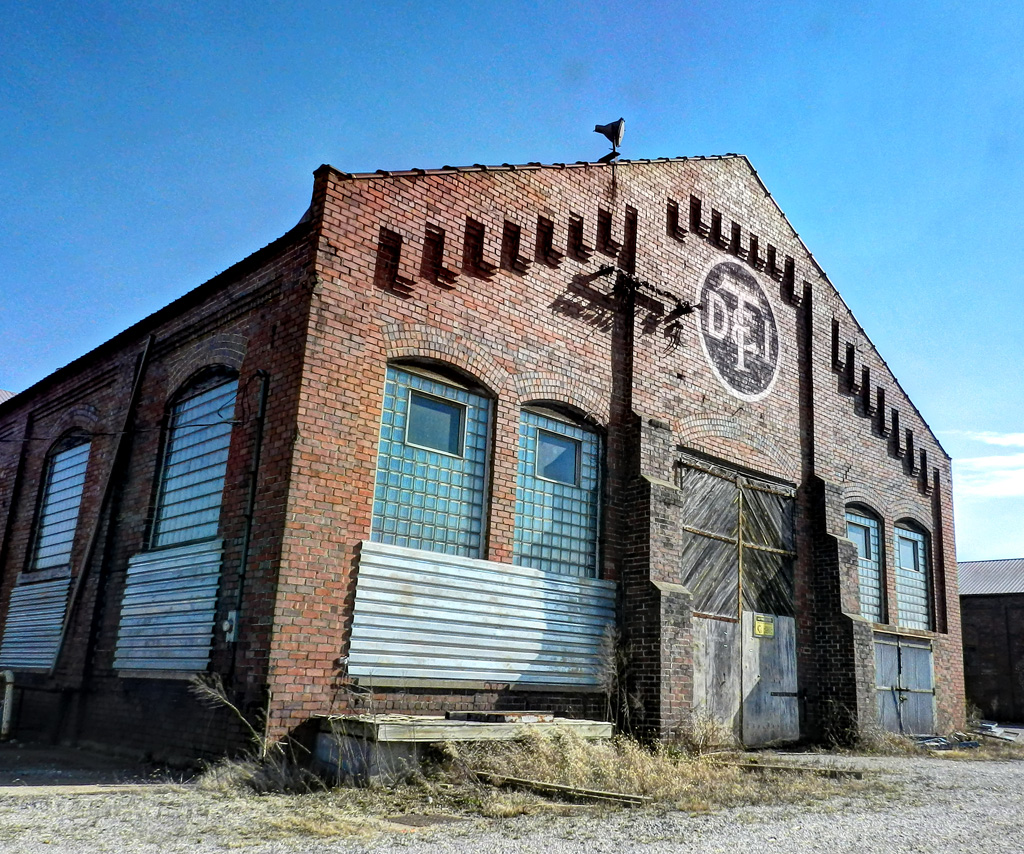
Old DT&I Railroad shop, Jackson, Ohio.

The following is a list of the major cities and towns along the DT&I:

Michigan

- Detroit
- Dearborn
- Allen Park
- Taylor
- Ecorse
- Flat Rock
- Wyandotte
- Woodhaven

Ohio

- Toledo
- Lima
- Springfield
- Washington Court House
- Greenfield
- Waverly
- Jackson
- Ironton

DT&I trains also served Cincinnati, Ohio via Pennsylvania Railroad trackage.
