= William Montagu, 9th Duke of Manchester =

British peer and politician (1877–1947)

His Grace The Duke of Manchester PC
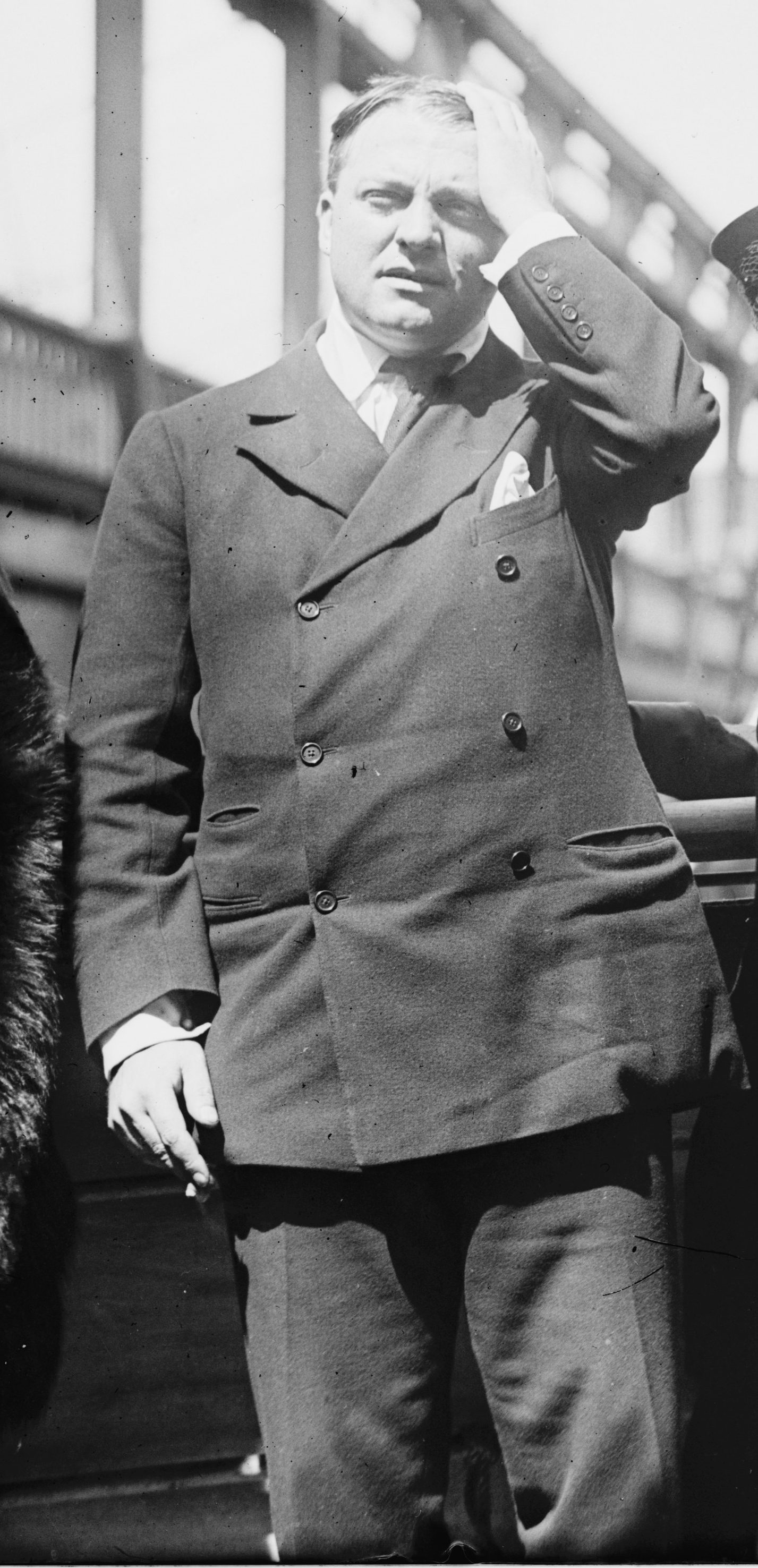
- Manchester, about 1910

Deputy Chief Whip of the House of Lords Captain of the Yeomen of the Guard
- In office 18 December 1905 – 20 April 1907
- Monarch: Edward VII
- Prime Minister: Sir Henry Campbell-Bannerman
- Preceded by: The Earl Waldegrave
- Succeeded by: The Lord Allendale

Personal details
- Born: 3 March 1877 Kimbolton Castle, Huntingdonshire, England
- Died: 9 February 1947 (aged 69) Seaford, East Sussex, England
- Party: Liberal
- Spouses: Helena Zimmerman (m. 1900; div. 1931) Kathleen Dawes (m. 1931)
- Children: Lady Mary Gregory; Alexander Montagu, 10th Duke of Manchester; Lord Edward Montagu; Lady Ellen Shairp
- Parents: George Montagu, 8th Duke of Manchester; Consuelo Yznaga
- Education: Trinity College, Cambridge

William Angus Drogo Montagu, 9th Duke of Manchester PC (3 March 1877 – 9 February 1947), styled Lord Kimbolton from 1877 to 1890 and Viscount Mandeville from 1890 to 1892, was a British peer and Liberal politician. He served as Captain of the Yeomen of the Guard from 1905 to 1907 under Sir Henry Campbell-Bannerman.

== Early life ==
Manchester was born on 3 March 1877 as William Angus Drogo Montagu. He was the only legitimate son of The 8th Duke of Manchester, by his wife Consuelo Yznaga del Valle, a Cuban American heiress. His sisters were Lady Jacqueline Mary Alva Montagu and Lady Alice Eleanor Louise Montagu, who both died unmarried.

His paternal grandparents were the 7th Duke of Manchester and the former Countess Louisa von Alten. After his grandfather's death in 1890, his grandmother got remarried to The 8th Duke of Devonshire, and was referred to as the "Double Duchess". His maternal grandfather was Don Antonio Yznaga del Valle. Among his maternal relatives was aunt Naticia Yznaga (wife of Sir John Lister-Kaye, 3rd Baronet), and uncle Fernando Yznaga (husband of Jennie Smith, sister of Alva Smith Vanderbilt Belmont).

He was educated at Eton and Trinity College, Cambridge.

== Career ==
Manchester succeeded his father in the dukedom in 1892 at the age of fifteen, and took his seat on the Liberal benches in the House of Lords in June 1902. When the Liberals came to power in December 1905 under Sir Henry Campbell-Bannerman, he was appointed Captain of the Yeomen of the Guard. He retained this post until April 1907, but never held ministerial office again.

Apart from his political career he was also an officer in the militia, being commissioned on 29 April 1899 as a captain in the 5th Battalion, King's Royal Rifle Corps (formerly the Huntingdonshire Militia, which had been commanded by several of his ancestors). On 18 June 1904 he transferred to the 6th (7th Royal Lancashire Militia) Battalion, Lancashire Fusiliers and served with it for several years.

== Property and bankruptcy ==
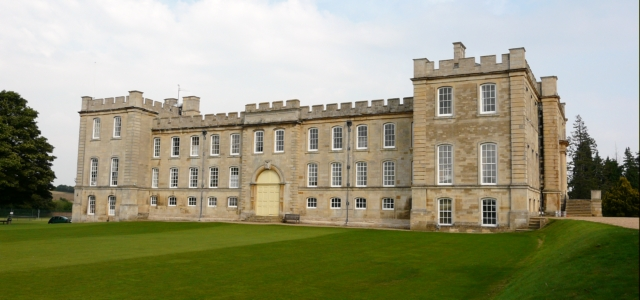
Kimbolton Castle, Huntingdonshire, the former seat of the Dukes of Manchester

In addition to the family estates inherited from his father, in 1910, he inherited the lease of his mother's townhouse at 5 Grosvenor Square, Mayfair.

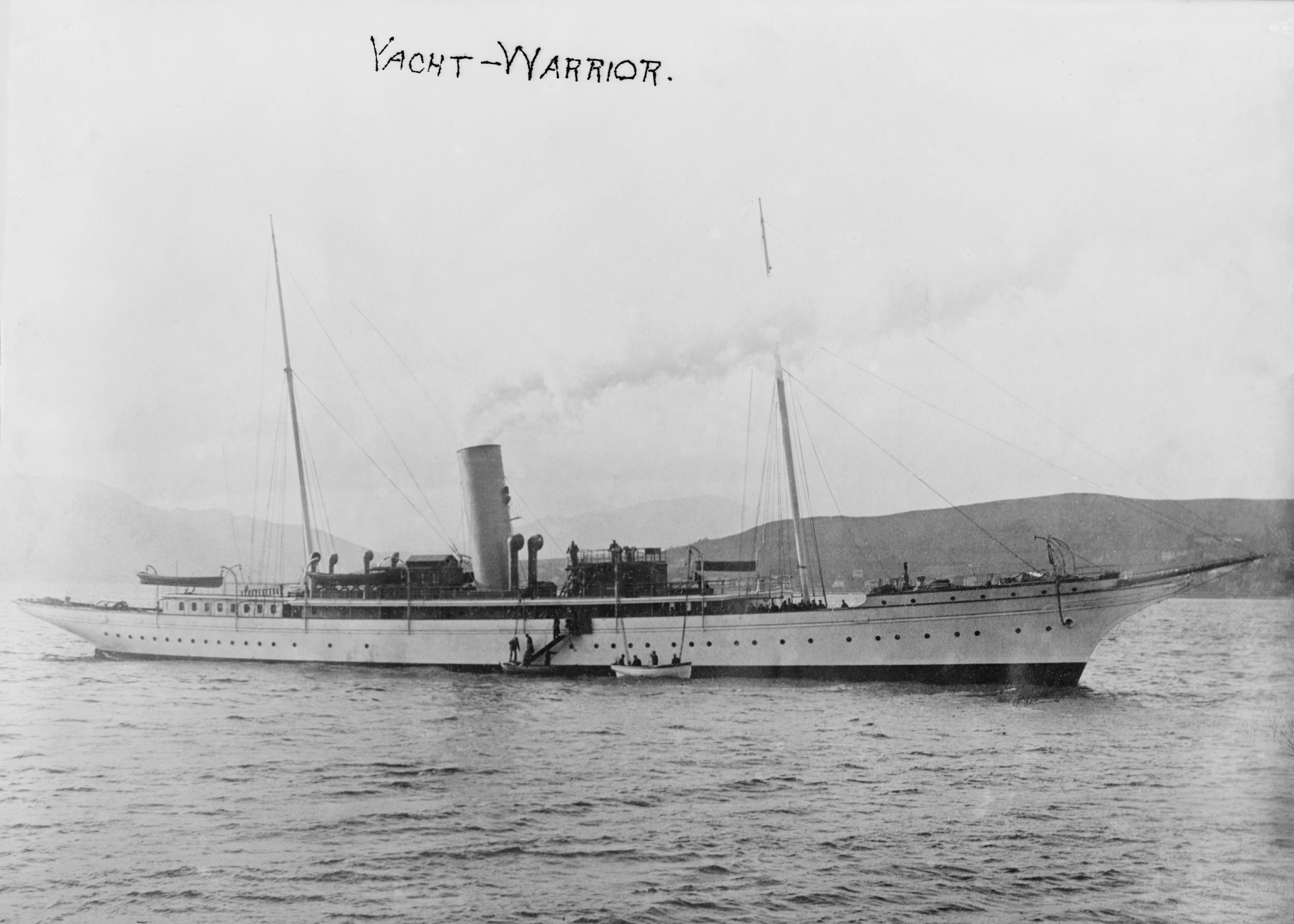
FW Vanderbilt's yacht Warrior

In 1911 he bought a steam yacht, Conqueror, from Frederick William Vanderbilt. In 1914 he and his then wife were guests aboard Vanderbilt's steam yacht Warrior when it ran aground in a heavy sea on the Caribbean coast of Colombia. The yacht could not be refloated, and the Vanderbilts and the Manchesters were rescued the next day by a steamship.

Manchester was a notorious spendthrift, and as a result of the excessive spending by him and the prior two Dukes, the family's fortune, which was already low, was completely exhausted and culminated in the sale of the family's lands during the tenure of the tenth Duke. He spent much of his life abroad, evading creditors, seeking out wealthy consorts, and attempting to extract money from wealthy acquaintances. He is perhaps most well known in America from the leading case of Hamilton v. Drogo, which concerned the establishment of a spendthrift trust for the benefit of the young Duke.

In 1935, the Duke was sentenced to nine months in HM Prison Wormwood Scrubs for false pretences, having made false statements to a pawnbroker to receive cash.

== Personal life ==
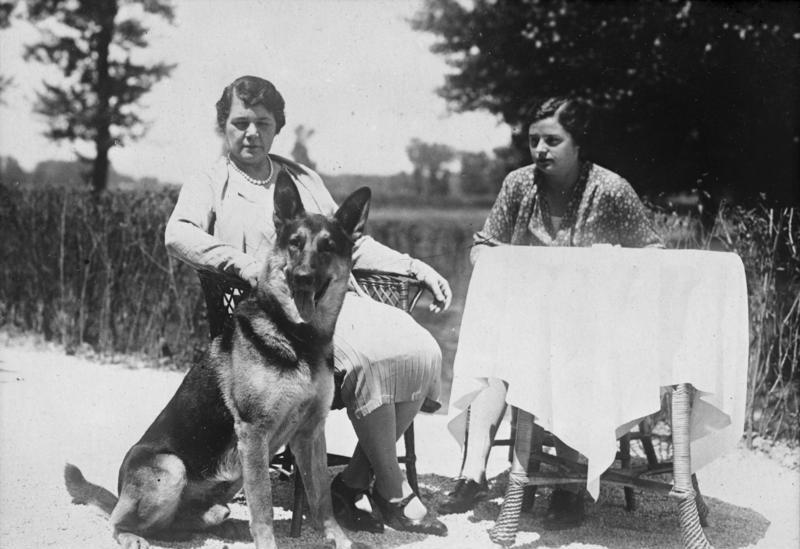
His wife and a daughter in 1930

On 14 November 1900, at Marylebone Church in London, Manchester was married to Helena Zimmerman, without her father or his mother present. She was the daughter of Eugene Zimmerman of Cincinnati, Ohio, United States, a railroad president and major stockholder in Standard Oil. The marriage was secret and his mother, Consuelo, was appalled by it. Together, they had four children:

- Lady Mary Alice Montagu (1901–1962), who married Fendall Littlepage Gregory in 1949.
- Alexander George Francis Drogo Montagu, 10th Duke of Manchester.
- Lord Edward Eugene Fernando Montagu (1906–1954/1956), who married Norah Macfarlane Potter, daughter of Albert Edward Potter of Ontario, Canada in 1929. They divorced in 1937 and he married Dorothy Vera Peters in 1937. They divorced in 1947 and he married, thirdly, Martha Mathews Hatton Bowen in 1947. After her death in 1951, he married portrait painter Cora Kellie, Baroness Kelly, in 1952. His fifth marriage was to Roberta Herold Joughlin in 1953.
- Lady Ellen Millicent Louise Montagu (1908–1948), who married to Herman Martin Hofer in 1936. They divorced in 1944 and she married John Norman Shairp in 1945.

The Duke and Duchess of Manchester divorced in December 1931. On 17 December 1931 Manchester married stage actress Kathleen Dawes, daughter of W. H. Dawes, a West End theatrical manager who was from Greenwich, Connecticut, United States. There were no children from this marriage.

The Duke of Manchester died at Seaford, East Sussex, on 9 February 1947, aged 69, and was succeeded in his titles by his son Alexander. The Dowager Duchess of Manchester died on 28 March 1966.

== Ancestry ==
Ancestors of William Montagu, 9th Duke of Manchester

8. George Montagu, 6th Duke of Manchester
4. William Montagu, 7th Duke of Manchester
9. Millicent Sparrow
2. George Montagu, 8th Duke of Manchester
10. Count Karl Franz Viktor von Alten
5. Countess Luise Friederike Auguste von Alten
11. Hermine de Schminke
1. William Montagu, 9th Duke of Manchester
12. Jose Antonio Iznaga y Borrell
6. Don Antonio Modesto Yznaga del Valle
13. Maria Francisca del Valle y Castillo
3. Consuelo Yznaga
14. Samuel Clements
7. Ellen Maria Clement
15. Maria Augusta Little

Political offices
Preceded by The Earl Waldegrave	Captain of the Yeomen of the Guard; 1905–1907	Succeeded by The Lord Allendale
Peerage of Great Britain
Preceded by George Victor; Drogo Montagu	Duke of Manchester; 1892–1947	Succeeded by Alexander George Francis; Drogo Montagu
