= Sidney Montagu, 11th Duke of Manchester =

British hereditary peer

His Grace The Duke of Manchester
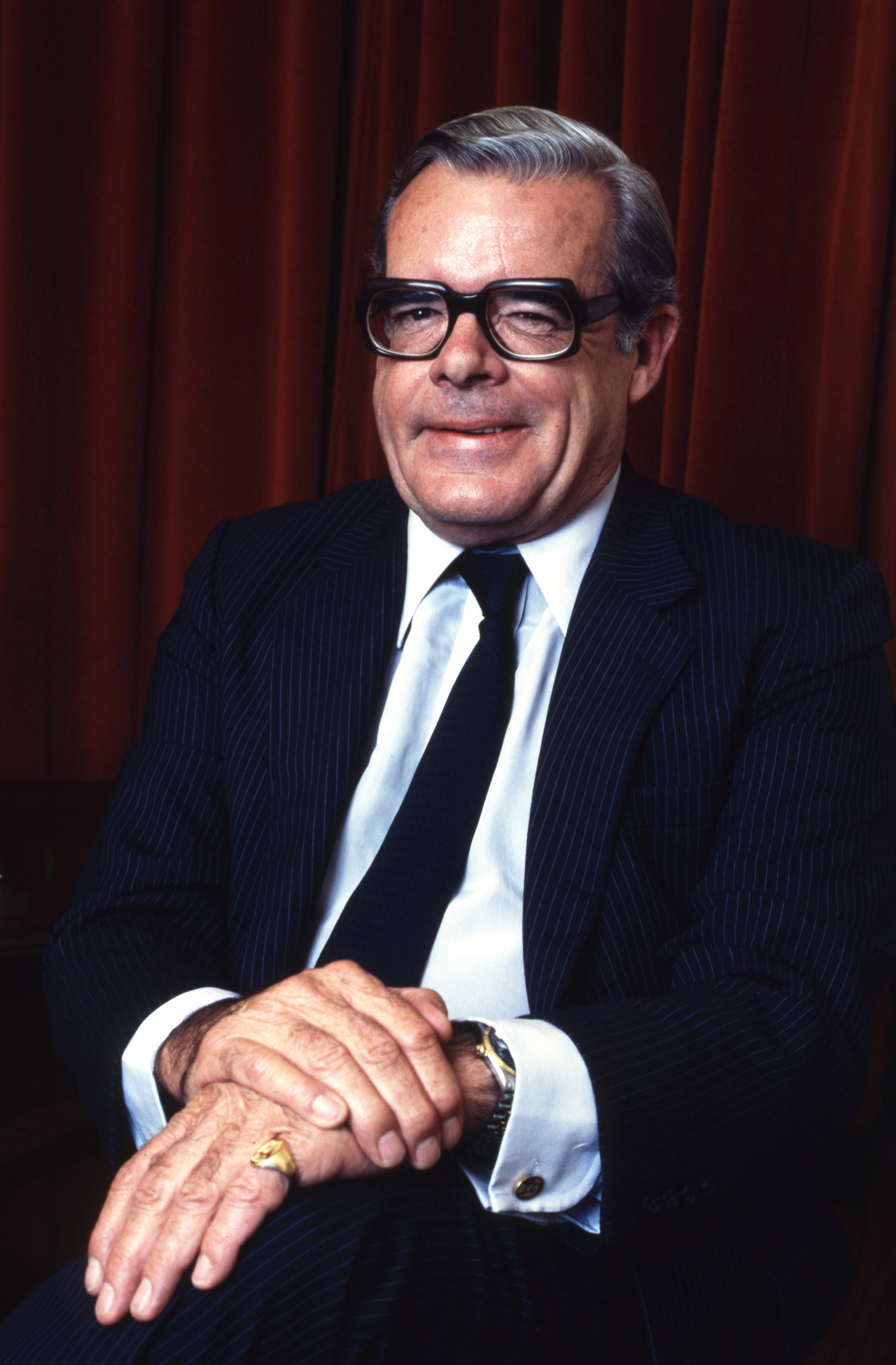
- Portrait by Allan Warren, 1981

Member of the House of Lords as Duke of Manchester
- In office 23 November 1977 – 3 June 1985
- Preceded by: Alexander Montagu
- Succeeded by: Angus Montagu

Personal details
- Born: Sidney Arthur Robin George Drogo Montagu, Lord Kimbolton; 5 February 1929 Kimbolton Castle, Huntingdonshire, England
- Died: 3 June 1985 (aged 56) Robin Hood Ranch, Tennessee, U.S.
- Resting place: Kimbolton Parish Church, Kimbolton, Cambridgeshire
- Spouse(s): Adrienne Christie (m. 1955; div. 1978) Andrea Joss (m. 1978)
- Parents: Alexander Montagu, 10th Duke of Manchester; Nell Vere Stead

Sidney Arthur Robin George Drogo "Kim" Montagu, 11th Duke of Manchester (5 February 1929 – 3 June 1985) was a British hereditary peer, the son of the 10th Duke of Manchester and the elder brother of the 12th Duke.

== Personal life ==
He married firstly on 5 February 1955 Adrienne Valerie Christie (d. 1988), daughter of Commander John Kenneth Christie, Ambassador of South Africa in Kenya; later Karawater farmer, near Ruigtevlei, Cape Town, South Africa. They divorced in 1978. He married secondly on 25 August 1978 Andrea Joss, daughter of Cecil Alexander Joss of Johannesburg, South Africa (d. 21 January 1996), who had previously been married twice, to Major S. Whitehead and to G. J. W. Kent. He had no children from either marriage.

In 1983, the Duke sued his stepmother, Elizabeth, who he believed had possession of several family heirlooms that he felt were rightfully his.

The Duke died suddenly at Robin Hood Ranch, Tennessee, United States, on 3 June 1985. His funeral took place on 13 June and he is buried at Kimbolton Parish Church.

== Duke of Manchester ==
Sidney inherited the dukedom upon his father's (Alexander Montagu) death in 1977. He held this title for eight years, until his own death in 1985. As he died childless, he was succeeded by his brother Angus Montagu, who became the 12th Duke of Manchester and he is the father of the current duke, Alexander Charles David Drogo Montagu, the 13th Duke of Manchester.

== Gallery ==
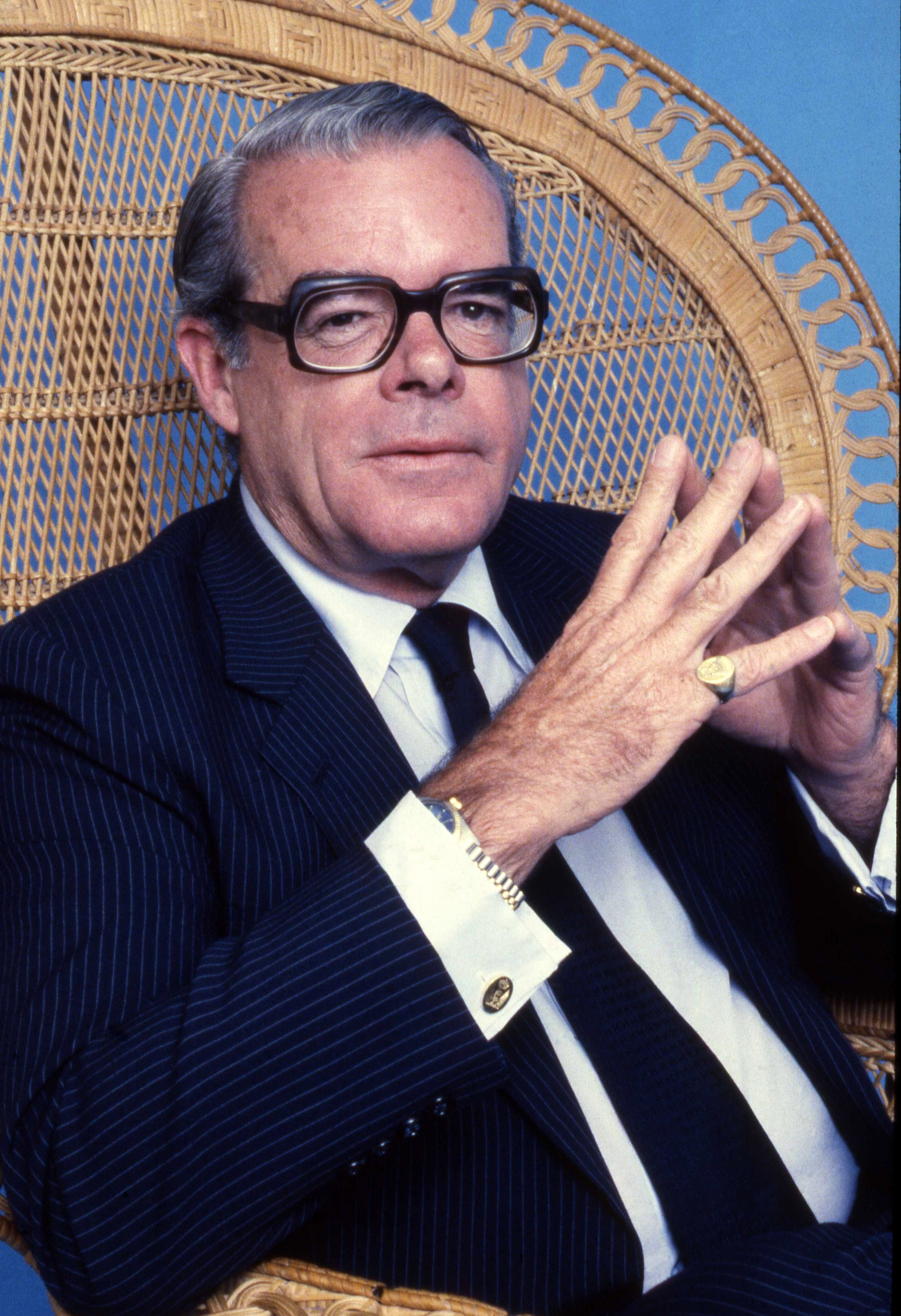
The Duke in 1981, by Allan Warren

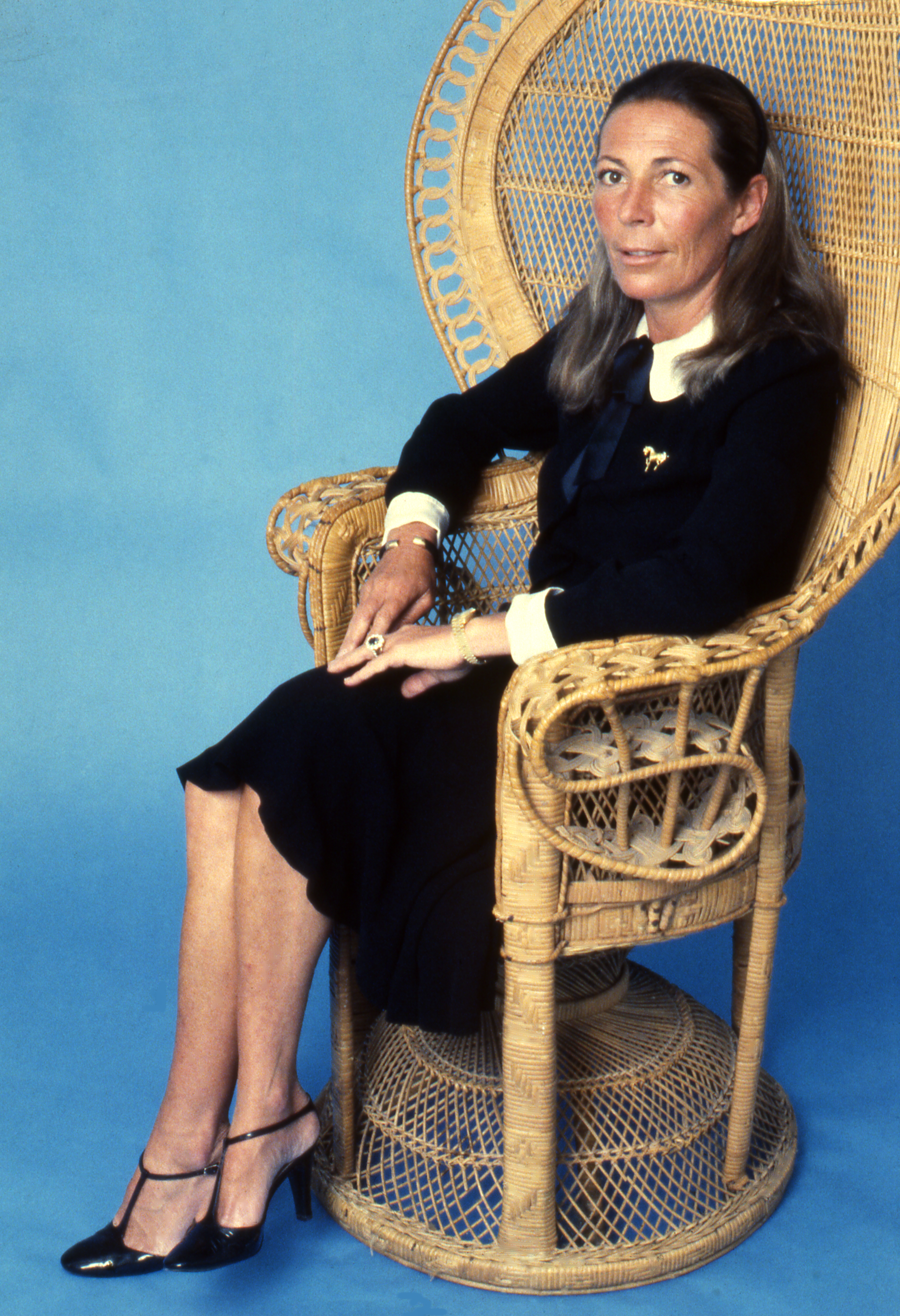
His second wife Andrea in 1982, by Allan Warren

Peerage of Great Britain
Preceded by Alexander Montagu	Duke of Manchester; 1977–1985	Succeeded by Angus Montagu
