= Alexander Montagu, 10th Duke of Manchester =

British hereditary peer

His Grace The Duke of Manchester OBE
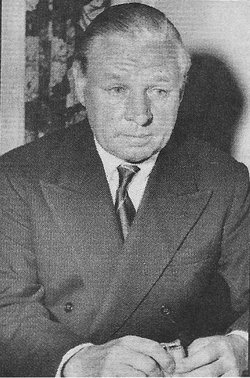

Personal details
- Born: Alexander George Francis Drogo Montagu, Viscount Mandeville; 2 October 1902 Tandragee Castle, County Armagh, Ulster, Ireland
- Died: 23 November 1977 (aged 75) London, England
- Spouses: Nell Vere Stead (m. 1927; died 1966) Elizabeth Fullerton (m. 1969)
- Children: The 11th Duke of Manchester; The 12th Duke of Manchester
- Parents: The 9th Duke of Manchester; Helena Zimmerman
- Education: Royal Naval College, Osborne; Britannia Royal Naval College

Military service
- Allegiance: UK
- Branch/service: Royal Navy
- Rank: Commander

Commander Alexander George Francis Drogo Montagu, 10th Duke of Manchester, OBE, RN (2 October 1902 – 23 November 1977), was a Royal Navy officer and British hereditary peer. From birth until February 1947, he was known by the courtesy title of Viscount Mandeville.

== Early life ==
Born at Tandragee Castle in the north of County Armagh in Ulster, in the north of Ireland, on 2 October 1902, Lord Mandeville was the son of the 9th Duke of Manchester by his marriage to Helena Zimmerman, the only child of Eugene Zimmerman, of Cincinnati, Ohio, United States, a railway president and major stockholder in Standard Oil. The wedding in November 1900 was kept secret from both families, and at first the Duke's mother did not believe reports of it. Queen Alexandra stood sponsor at his christening in the Chapel Royal (St. James's Palace) on 17 December 1902.

In 1931, his parents were divorced, when his father was reported to be planning to marry an actress. In 1937, Helena Manchester married secondly the 10th Earl of Kintore.

Mandeville was educated at the Royal Naval College, Osborne, and the Royal Naval College, Dartmouth.

== Career ==
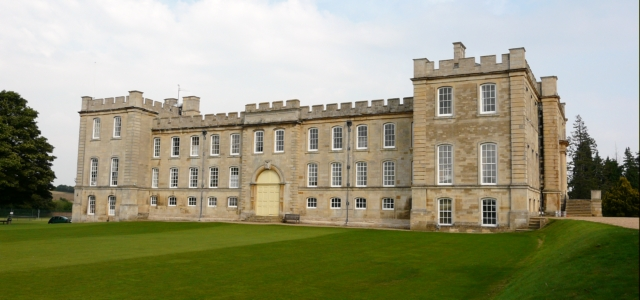
Kimbolton Castle, the family seat which the 10th Duke was the last to own

From Dartmouth, Lord Mandeville was commissioned into the Royal Navy in 1919. He held the rank of Commander when he retired from the service in 1930.

During the Second World War, Mandeville was posted to Ceylon, and in 1940 was appointed an Officer of the Order of the British Empire. After the end of the War he gave up living in England, moving to the Colony and Protectorate of Kenya in 1946. There, he farmed an estate of 10,000 acres. He succeeded to the Dukedom of Manchester on his father's death in February 1947.

During the 1950s, the Duke sold both the principal family seat, Kimbolton Castle, along with most of its contents, and Tandragee Castle in Northern Ireland. By the 1960s, he had also sold most of the other landed estates in the British Isles which had come to him.

== Personal life ==
On 5 May 1927, he married firstly, at Kimbolton Castle, Huntingdonshire, Nell Vere Stead (Ashfield, New South Wales, Australia, 1902 – 2 September 1966), daughter of Sydney Vere Stead (1861 – South Yarra, Victoria, Australia, 1929), of Melbourne, and wife Jessie Lillian Dickinson (Newtown, New South Wales, Australia, 1873 – Armadale, Victoria, Australia, 1926), with whom he had two sons:

- Sidney Montagu, 11th Duke of Manchester (1929–1985)
- Angus Montagu, 12th Duke of Manchester (1938–2002)

On 7 February 1969, he married secondly, and without further issue, Elizabeth (née Fullerton) Coleman Crocker (1913–2007), daughter of Samuel Clyde Fullerton of Miami, Oklahoma, United States. She had formerly been married to oil magnate George L. Coleman, then to William Willard Crocker, a son of William Henry Crocker and grandson of Charles Crocker.

At the time of his death in 1977, he was still listed in Who's Who as living at Kapsirowa, Hoey's Bridge, Kenya, but he died in London, after running through most of his inherited wealth.

His elder son, Sidney Arthur Robin George Drogo Montagu, succeeded him as 11th Duke of Manchester. He died without issue, so his brother, Angus Charles Drogo Montagu, became the 12th Duke.

Peerage of Great Britain
Preceded by William Angus Drogo Montagu	Duke of Manchester; 1947–1977	Succeeded by Sidney Arthur Robin George Drogo Montagu
