= Angus Montagu, 12th Duke of Manchester =

British aristocrat (1938–2002)

His Grace The Duke of Manchester
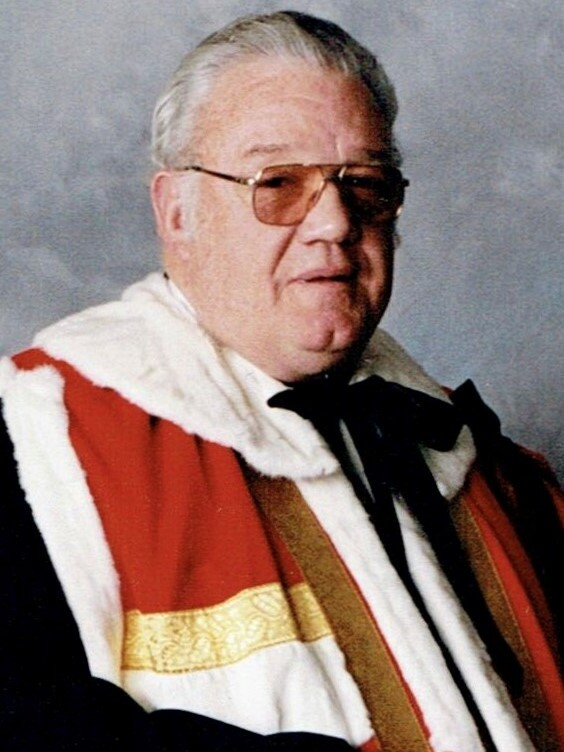
- Manchester in 2002

Member of the House of Lords as Duke of Manchester
- In office 3 June 1985 – 11 November 1999
- Preceded by: The 11th Duke of Manchester
- Succeeded by: House of Lords Act 1999

Personal details
- Born: Angus Charles Drogo Montagu; 9 October 1938 Kimbolton Castle, Huntingdonshire, England
- Died: 25 July 2002 (aged 63) Bedford, England
- Spouses: Mary Eveleen McClure (m. 1961; div. 1970) Diane Pauline Plimsaul (m. 1971; div. 1985) Anne-Louise Taylor (m. 1989; div. 1998) Biba Hiller, née Jennians (m. 2000; div. 2001)
- Children: Alexander Montagu, 13th Duke of Manchester; Lord Kimble William Drogo Montagu; Lady Emma Montagu
- Parents: The 10th Duke of Manchester; Nell Vere Stead

Angus Charles Drogo Montagu, 12th Duke of Manchester (9 October 1938 – 25 July 2002), was a British hereditary peer. He inherited the Dukedom of Manchester in 1985 and was a member of the House of Lords until the House of Lords Act 1999. Until he inherited the dukedom, he was known by the courtesy title of Lord Angus Montagu.

Angus grew up in Britain, Ceylon and Kenya. After serving in the Royal Marines, he lived for some years in Australia from 1959 and had a number of jobs. He returned to England in the late 1960s. During middle age, he suffered from financial hardship and fell victim to a number of confidence tricks for which he took the blame. He was known for his friendly and outgoing personality, and his few speeches in the House of Lords were viewed positively.

== Early life ==
Lord Angus Montagu was born on 9 October 1938 in the family seat of Kimbolton Castle near Bedford, the younger son of Viscount Mandeville, who in February 1947 became Duke of Manchester, by his marriage to Nell Vere Stead. His older brother was the future Sidney Montagu, 11th Duke of Manchester. Their parents moved frequently during their childhood, including spending time in Singapore and Ceylon, with a period of living in a convent in the latter. Lord Angus did not enjoy his time there, later saying the nuns "weren't very pleasant people".

In 1950, Lord Angus joined his father, the 10th Duke, in Kenya for a short period after Kimbolton was sold. He had a good relationship with his mother, who enjoyed looking after young children, and was spoiled as a result. He attended the local school in Kenya, but was bullied and stopped going, and consequently had no regular formal education until he was eleven. He was later educated as a boarder at Trearddur House, Trearddur Bay, Anglesey, a prep school, and Gordonstoun School, Moray, Scotland, returning to Kenya each summer to spend time with his family. He left school in 1956 without any qualifications and began service in the Royal Marines, joining HMS Loch Fyne in January 1957. He was the only public-school educated man on the ship and did not get on well with his fellow recruits.

Upon discharge, Lord Angus had jobs in the oil industry and in tourist-related activities across the United States. He moved to Australia in 1959 and was variously employed as a clothes salesman, a barman, and a crocodile wrestler. He later spent time in Canada and by 1968 had moved into a single room in Bedford, England, near Kimbolton.

The 10th Duke's business ventures in Kenya failed, reducing the family fortune from millions to £70,000 by time of his death in 1977.

== Criminal charges ==
By the 1980s, Lord Angus had little money and no profession, and his warm personality made him vulnerable to fraudsters and confidence tricksters. In 1985, he was arrested and charged with conspiracy to commit fraud against the National Westminster Bank (NatWest) for £38,000. He inherited the title of Duke of Manchester while awaiting trial. He was acquitted, after the trial judge had found him to lack the competence and intelligence to conduct and organise such a raid and considered he had been set up by others to take the blame. In the judge's words, "on a business scale of one to ten, the Duke is one or less, and even that flatters him".

== Duke of Manchester ==
On 3 June 1985, Lord Angus's older brother, the 11th Duke, who had no children, died suddenly in the United States, so that he inherited his titles and seat in the House of Lords, but little else. He had had a fraught relationship with his elder brother, whose remaining property passed to his widow, Andrea, Duchess of Manchester. On her death in 1996, she left everything she had to her eldest child, the 11th Duke's stepson.

As a hereditary peer, the new Duke was able to take a seat in the Lords, but he did not make his maiden speech there until 25 November 1991, in a debate on the European Union. The speech was only three minutes long; it was praised for its brevity and succinctness by other peers, including Viscount Tonypandy. The Duke also raised questions about redundancies in the Armed Forces with the Leader of the House of Lords, Viscount Cranborne.

In 1991, the Duke became honorary chairman of the Tampa Bay Lightning ice hockey team, pledging to raise $25 million. He was also chairman of a holding company based in Dublin, Link International, which was responsible for raising the money. The company failed, unable to pay significant debts, and in 1996 the Duke was convicted of fraud. At the trial, his defence lawyer argued that he was the victim of a confidence trick by a business partner, and that the Duke had been made use of because of his gullibility, vanity, and foolishness. He was jailed for 33 months and served 28, following which he was deported back to Britain.

== Other work ==
The Duke was good friends with celebrity photographer Allan Warren. Together, they established the Duke's Trust, a charity for children in need. Towards the end of his life, the Duke set up the company Unique Tours, to show American tourists places such as Stratford Upon Avon. He found that customers liked meeting a genuine English peer.

== Family ==
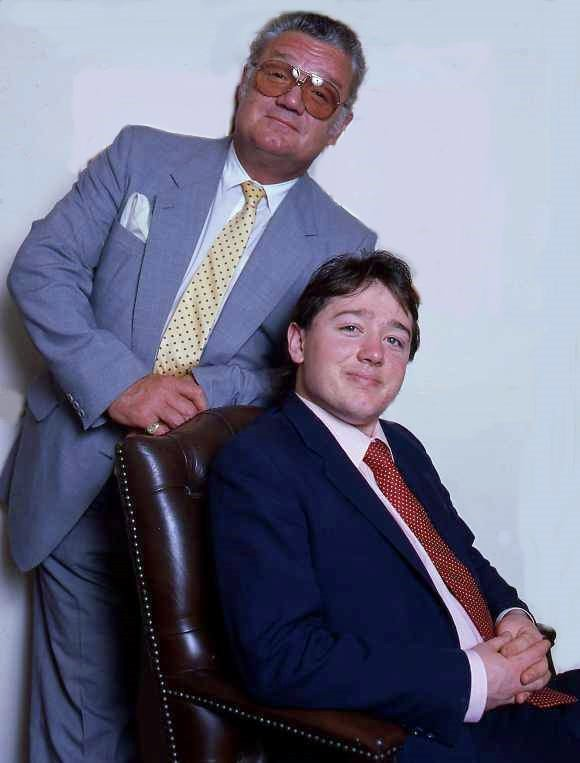
The Duke of Manchester with his younger son, Lord Kimble Montagu. Photo: Allan Warren (1993)

Angus Montagu was married four times:

- On 22 November 1961 in Geelong, County of Grant, Victoria, Australia, he married Mary Eveleen McClure (born 10 December 1937 in Geelong – died 1 July 2025 Sydney), a newspaper columnist, daughter of Walter Gillespie McClure, who had been a director of Holden, and Beatrice Evelyn Stinton. They had three children (see below). Angus and Mary were separated in 1965 and divorced in 1970; she continued to style herself Duchess of Manchester. Issue from the first marriage:
  - (1) Alexander Charles David Drogo Montagu later the 13th Duke of Manchester (born 1962)
  - (2) Lord Kimble William Drogo Montagu (born October 1964)
  - (3) Lady Emma Montagu (September 1965 – 29 April 2014)
- On 5 March 1971, Angus married Diane Pauline Plimsaul of Wimborne, Dorset, daughter of Arthur Plimsaul of Corfe Mullen. They were divorced in 1985, after Montagu had inherited the dukedom, and his second wife is now Diane, Duchess of Manchester.
- On 27 January 1989, Manchester married Anne-Louise Taylor (known as Louise), formerly Mrs Bird, daughter of Alfred Butler Taylor of Cawthorne, Yorkshire. They were divorced in 1998, following his incarceration. She is now Anne-Louise, Duchess of Manchester. At the time of the Duke's death, he was attempting to reconcile with Louise.
- On 22 April 2000, at the Swedish Church, Mayfair, in London, the Duke of Manchester married the former fashion model Biba Hiller (born Jennians on 3 February 1942), but they were divorced the following year. Biba, Duchess of Manchester, died of cancer aged 61 on 11 October 2003.

Angus had been a close friend with Jane Probyn and they were briefly informally engaged around 1960. They remained friends for the rest of his life.

== Death ==
The Duke died of a heart attack at home on 25 July 2002, aged 63. At the time of his death, his debts exceeded his assets, so his estate had a net deficiency. His funeral took place at Bedford Crematorium on 5 August, with his children Kimble and Emma, and ex-wives Diane and Louise in attendance. His ashes were later placed in the Montagu Vault at St Andrew's Church, Kimbolton, Cambridgeshire, the traditional burial place of the Earls and Dukes of Manchester and their family members.

The House of Lords Act 1999 largely abolished the rights of hereditary peers to sit in the House of Lords with some limited exceptions; the Duke of Manchester was not among them. He was succeeded by his eldest son, Alexander.

Peerage of Great Britain
Preceded by Sidney Montagu	Duke of Manchester; 1985–2002	Succeeded by Alexander Montagu
