= Tandragee Castle =

Castle in County Armagh, Northern Ireland

Coordinates: 54.354°N 6.417°W

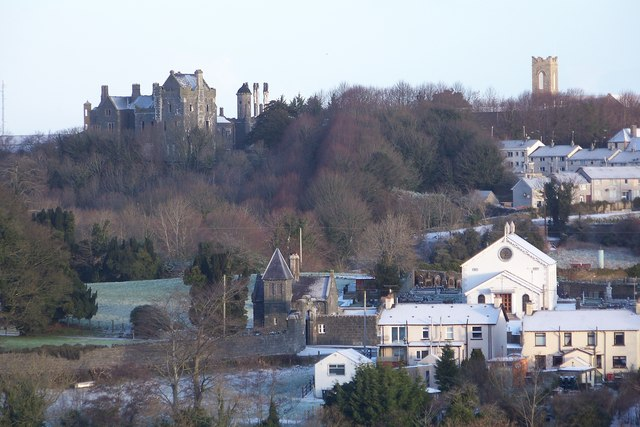
Tandragee Castle sits above the town of Tandragee in County Armagh

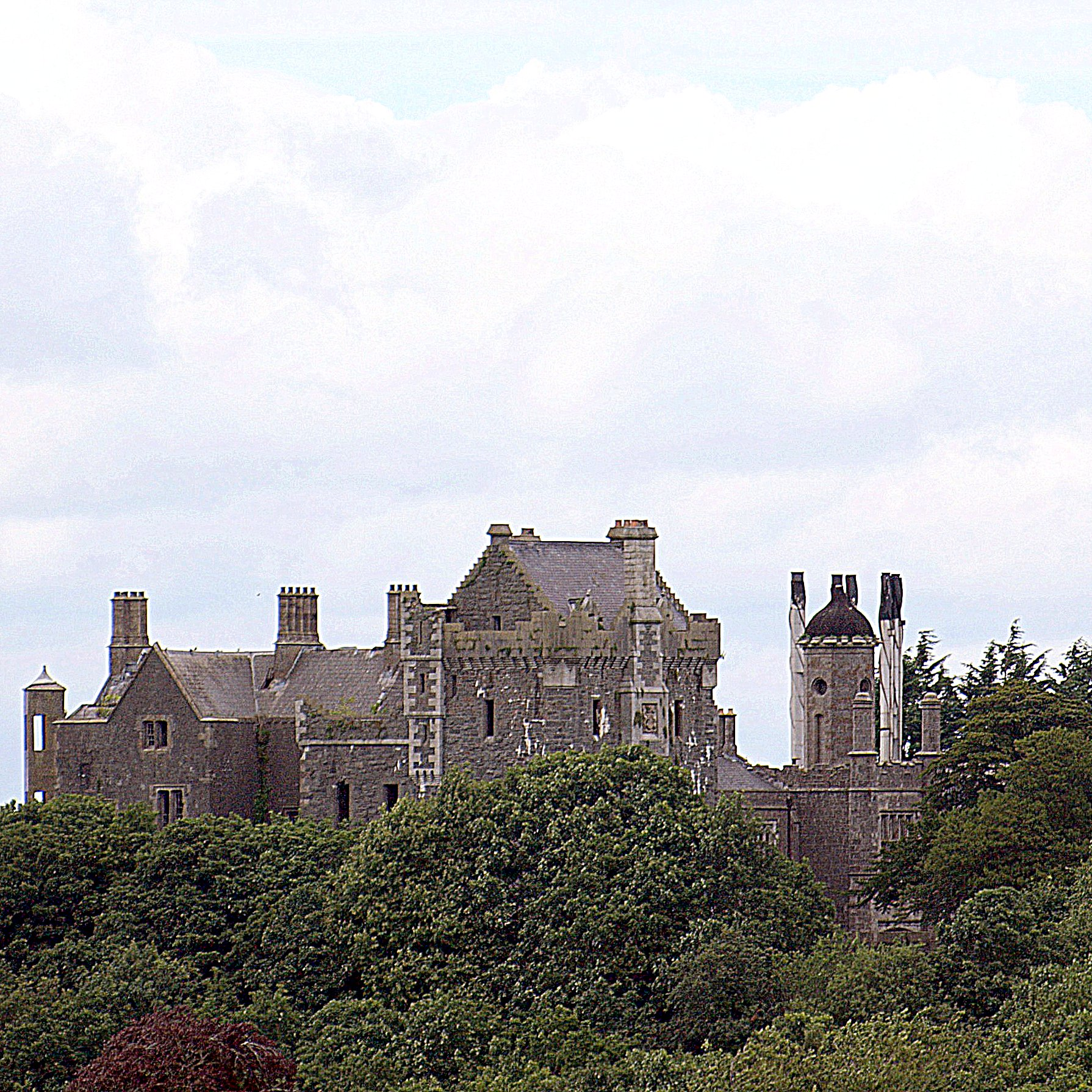
Roofline of Tandragee Castle

The current Tandragee Castle, in Tandragee, County Armagh, Northern Ireland, was rebuilt in 1837 for George Montagu, 6th Duke of Manchester as the family's Irish home. The 6th Duke of Manchester acquired the estate through his marriage to Millicent Sparrow (1798–1848).

== Past and present owners ==
The past and present owners of Tandragee Castle are:

- 1610: Oliver St John, 1st Viscount Grandison
- 1630: Sir John St John, 1st Baronet
- 1648: Henry St John of Tandragee
- Robert Sparrow
- Robert Bernard Sparrow
- 1805: Lady Olivia Sparrow
- 1822: Millicent Sparrow & George Montagu, 6th Duke of Manchester (rebuilt the castle)
- 1855: William Montagu, 7th Duke of Manchester
- 1882: George Montagu, 8th Duke of Manchester
- 1890: William Montagu, 9th Duke of Manchester
- 1940s: Alexander Montagu, 10th Duke of Manchester
- 1955: Thomas Hutchinson

== History ==
During the Plantation of Ulster the castle at Tandragee became the property of Sir Oliver St John, Lord Deputy of Ireland. He rebuilt the original stronghold of the O'Hanlon Clan. During the Irish Rebellion of 1641, however, the O'Hanlons attempted to regain their lands – the result was the castle being ruined; it remained so for two hundred years.

Tandragee Castle underwent reconstruction around 1837, following its destruction during the Irish Rebellion of 1641, commissioned by George Montagu, 6th Duke of Manchester. In 1928, Alexander Montagu, 10th Duke of Manchester, left the castle until the outbreak of World War II.

=== World War II ===
In 1943, Alexander Montagu leased Tandragee Castle to the United States Army for use during World War II. Reports suggest that while inspecting troops in Northern Ireland General George S. Patton was guest of honour at a dance in the castle in 1943.

=== Present day ===
The castle and estate were sold by Alexander Montagu, 10th Duke of Manchester (who was born at Tandragee) in the 1950s, and it was purchased by Thomas Hutchinson, a businessman from Tandragee who founded Tayto. Today, the castle houses offices for the Tayto potato crisp factory and the park's demesne incorporates a golf course.
