= Kimbolton Castle =

Country house in Cambridgeshire, England

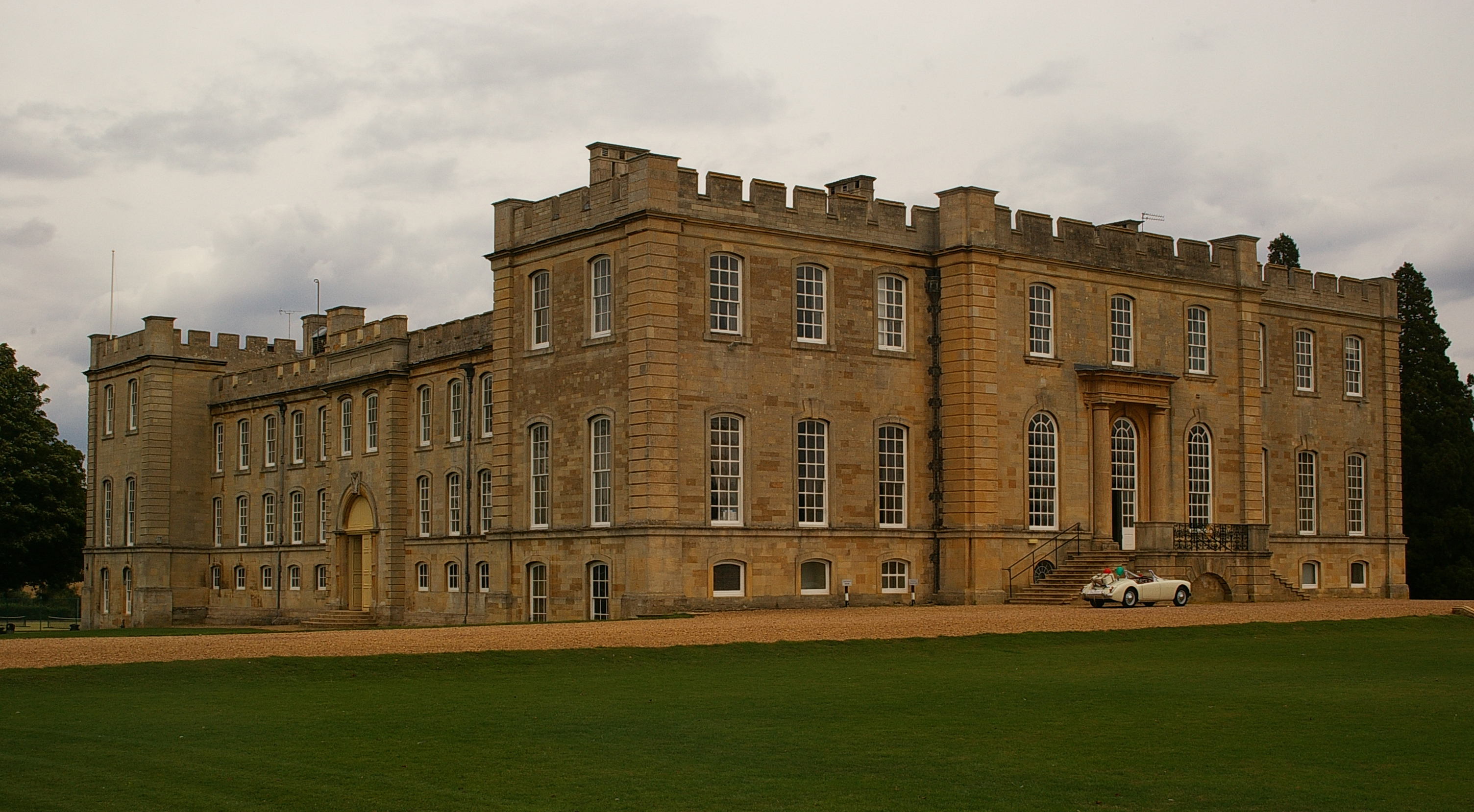
- The castle in 2011

Additional information
Location within Cambridgeshire
52°17′47″N 0°23′18″W
Type	Country house
Location	Kimbolton, Cambridgeshire
OS grid reference	TL100677
History
Built	1525
Built for	Richard Wingfield, Charles Montagu, 1st Duke of Manchester
Rebuilt	c.1690-1720
Site notes
Architect(s)	Henry Bell, John Vanbrugh, Nicholas Hawksmoor, Robert Adam
Architectural styles	Tudor fragments, Baroque
Current use	School
Owner	Kimbolton School
Website	kimbolton.cambs.sch.uk/castle
Listed Building – Grade I
Official name	Kimbolton School
Designated	24 October 1951
Reference no.	1221022
Listed Building – Grade I
Official name	Gatehouse to Kimbolton School
Designated	24 October 1951
Reference no.	1221020

Kimbolton Castle is a country house in Kimbolton, Cambridgeshire, England. It was the final home of King Henry VIII's first wife, Catherine of Aragon. Originally a medieval castle but converted into a stately palace, it was the family seat of the Earls and Dukes of Manchester from 1615 until 1950. It now houses Kimbolton School.

== History ==
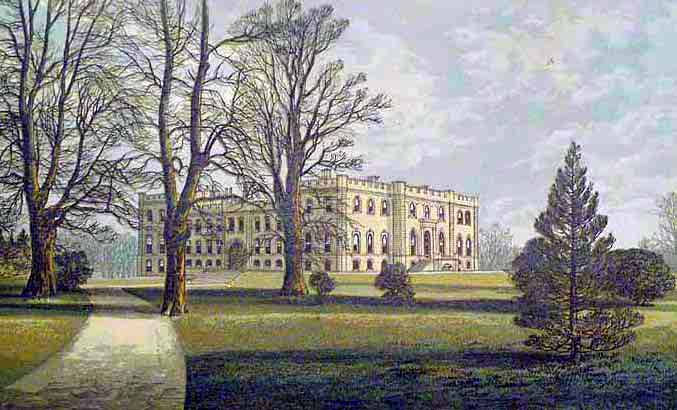
Kimbolton Castle in 1880. This illustration shows the present mansion as rebuilt between 1690 and 1720

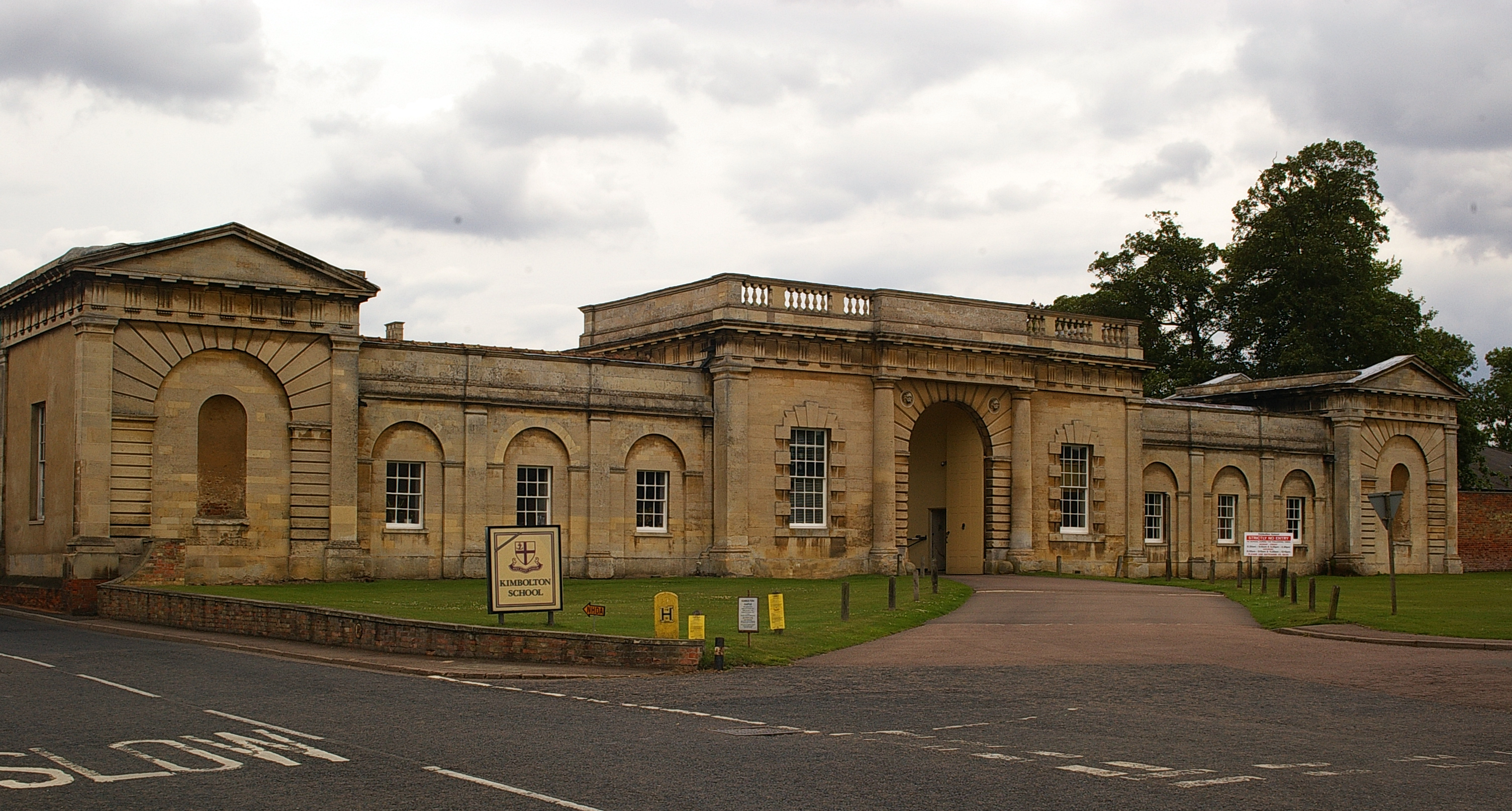
Kimbolton School, Gatehouse

The castle was built by Geoffrey Fitz Peter, 1st Earl of Essex, in the late 12th century. The inner court was rebuilt by Anne, Duchess of Buckingham, in the late 15th century.

The castle was acquired by Sir Richard Wingfield in 1522. Upon his death in 1525, it was inherited by his eldest son, Charles. The Wingfield family reconstructed the medieval castle as a Tudor manor house, parts of which survive to the present day. Catherine of Aragon was sent here in April 1534 for refusing to give up her status or deny the validity of her marriage. In July 1534, a fool in the retinue of the diplomat Eustache Chapuys tried to swim the moat, drawing attention to her imprisonment. The fenland climate damaged her health, and she died in the castle on 7 January 1536.

The castle was bought by Sir John Popham in 1600 and was later purchased by Sir Henry Montagu, later created 1st Earl of Manchester, in 1615. Charles Montagu, 4th Earl of Manchester, who was created 1st Duke of Manchester in 1719, had many works of reconstruction carried out between 1690 and 1720. These works included the rebuilding of the south wing, which had fallen down, to a design by Sir John Vanbrugh who was assisted by another great architect of the time, Nicholas Hawksmoor. During 1690 and 1695 the castle courtyard was remodelled and is attributed on stylistic grounds to Henry Bell (1647–1711) who refronted the Tudor courtyard and introduced galleries and the main staircase. George Montagu, 4th Duke of Manchester commissioned Robert Adam to design the gatehouse, which was constructed in 1766.

Many members of the Montagu family (Earls and Dukes of Manchester) are buried at St Andrew's Church in Kimbolton. Several Montagu monuments still exist in the South Chapel, while the Montagu vault (extended in 1853) is located beneath the North Chapel.

Alexander Montagu, 10th Duke of Manchester sold the contents in 1949, and the castle and 50 acres (20 hectares) were sold to Kimbolton School in 1951.

== Warren House ==
On the grounds of the castle is Warren House, where the warrener (the estate's rabbit gamekeeper) used to live. It was converted into a late 18th-century folly on command of one of the castle's inhabitants to add interest to his horizon, complete with a single decorative façade facing the castle; it is Grade II* listed and owned by the Landmark Trust. The Trust renovated the house, under a design from architect Oliver Caroe, between 2011 and 2012.

== See also ==
- Castles in Great Britain and Ireland
- List of castles in England
