= Charles Brandon, 3rd Duke of Suffolk =

English duke (1537–1551)

His Grace The Duke of Suffolk
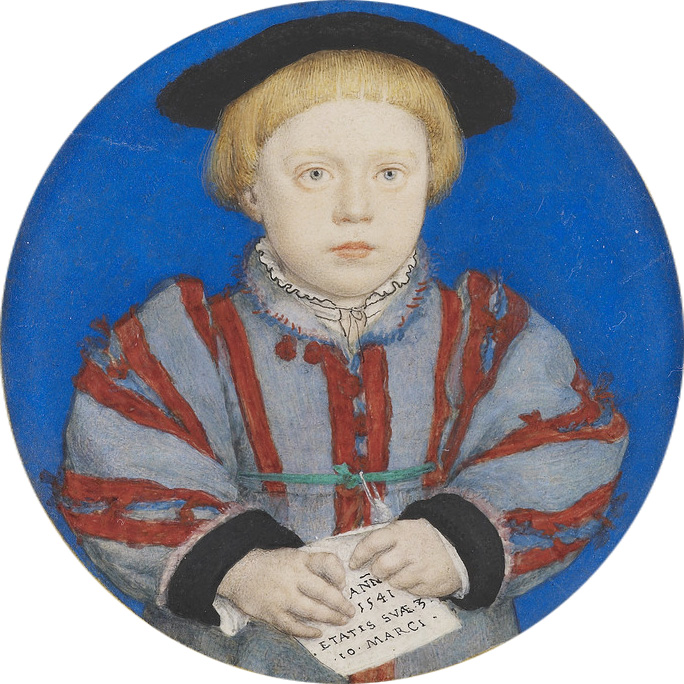
- Charles Brandon, portrait miniature by Hans Holbein the Younger, 1541

Duke of Suffolk
- In office 14 July 1551 – 14 July 1551
- Preceded by: Henry Brandon, 2nd Duke of Suffolk
- Succeeded by: Title extinct

Personal details
- Born: 12 October 1537
- Died: 14 July 1551 (aged 13) Bishop of Lincoln's Palace, Buckden
- Parent(s): Charles Brandon, 1st Duke of Suffolk; Catherine Willoughby
- Education: St John's College, Cambridge

Charles Brandon, 3rd Duke of Suffolk (12 October 1537 – 14 July 1551), known as Lord Charles Brandon until shortly before his death, was the son of the 1st Duke of Suffolk and the suo jure 12th Baroness Willoughby de Eresby.

His father had previously been married to Mary Tudor, sister of King Henry VIII. Following Mary's death, he had married Lady Willoughby de Eresby, who had been originally intended as the bride of his son Henry.

In 1541, Lord Charles Brandon and his older brother Lord Henry Brandon had their miniatures painted by Hans Holbein the Younger.

He died of the sweating sickness one hour after the same disease claimed his elder brother Henry (who had succeeded their father as 2nd Duke of Suffolk in 1545), and because of this holds the record for the shortest tenure of a British peerage. (The 2nd Baron Stamp may claim a shorter tenure, but merely through a legal fiction.) Suffolk died without issue and his title became extinct. They died at the Bishop of Lincoln's Palace in the village of Buckden near Huntingdon, Huntingdonshire, where they had fled in an attempt to escape the epidemic.

A solemn celebration of the funerals of the two Dukes, called a 'Month's Mind', was held on 22 September 1551 with all the funeral equipment in duplicate. The humanist intellectuals Thomas Wilson and Walter Haddon wrote a life of Suffolk and his older brother shortly after their death.

Peerage of England
Preceded by Henry Brandon	Duke of Suffolk; 1551	Extinct
