= Charles Brandon, 1st Duke of Suffolk =

English nobleman, diplomat and military commander (c. 1484–1545)

His Grace The Duke of Suffolk KG
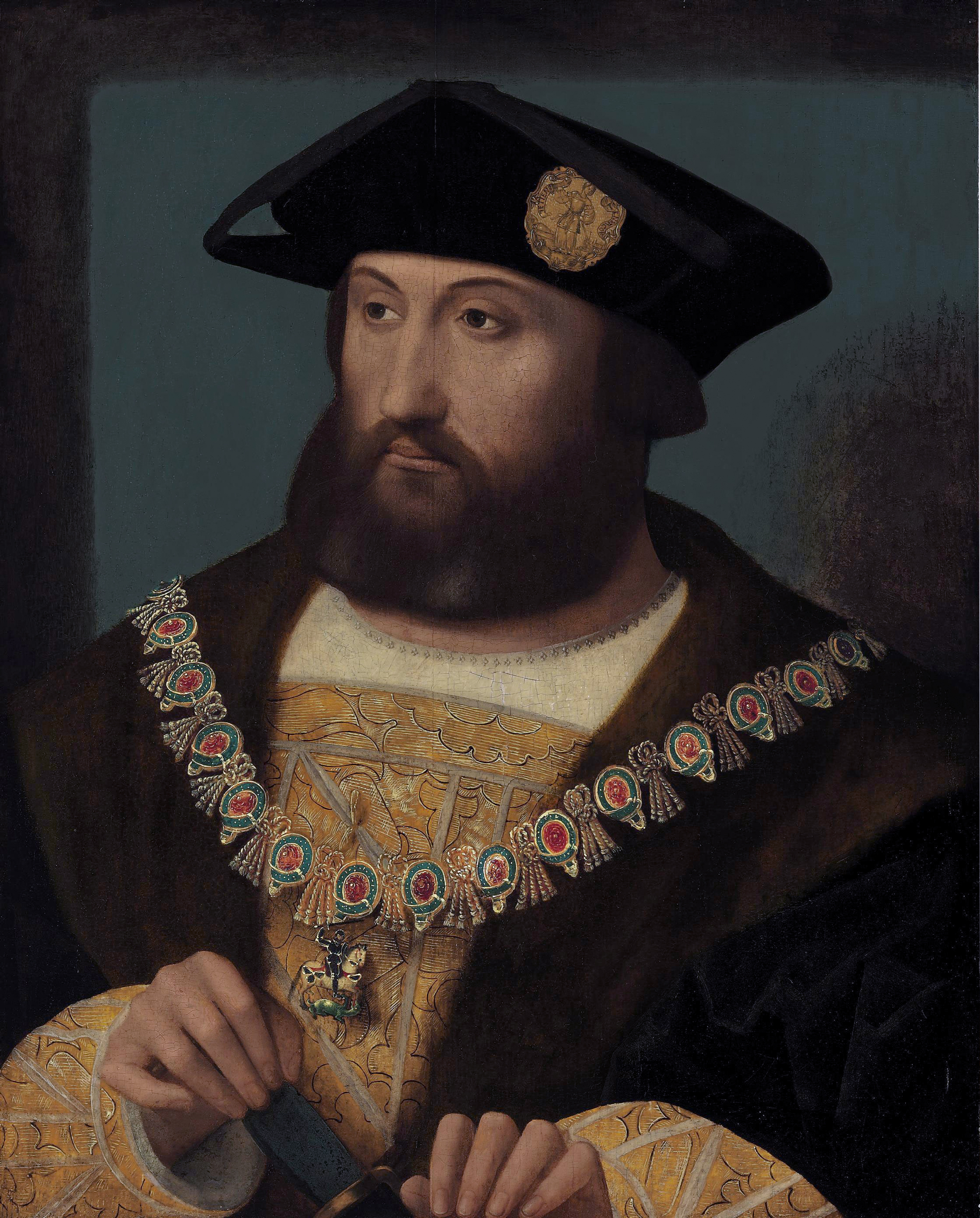
- Charles Brandon, 1st Duke of Suffolk, wearing the Collar of the Garter, c. 1530

Lord President of the Council
- In office 1530–1545
- Monarch: Henry VIII
- Succeeded by: The Lord St. John

Lord Steward
- In office 1541–1544
- Monarch: Henry VIII
- Preceded by: The Earl of Shrewsbury
- Succeeded by: The Lord St. John

Personal details
- Born: c. 1484
- Died: 22 August 1545 (aged 60–61) Guildford, Surrey, England
- Resting place: St. George's Chapel, Windsor Castle
- Spouse(s): Margaret Neville; Anne Browne; Mary Tudor; Katherine Willoughby
- Children: Anne Brandon, Baroness Grey of Powys; Mary Brandon, Baroness Monteagle; Henry Brandon; Frances Brandon, Duchess of Suffolk; Eleanor Brandon, Countess of Cumberland; Henry Brandon, 1st Earl of Lincoln; Henry Brandon, 2nd Duke of Suffolk; Charles Brandon, 3rd Duke of Suffolk
- Parent(s): Sir William Brandon; Elizabeth Bruyn
- Occupation: Courtier, Military commander

Military service
- Battles/wars: War of the League of Cambrai; Battle of Guinegate; Italian War of 1542–1546; Sieges of Boulogne (1544–1546)

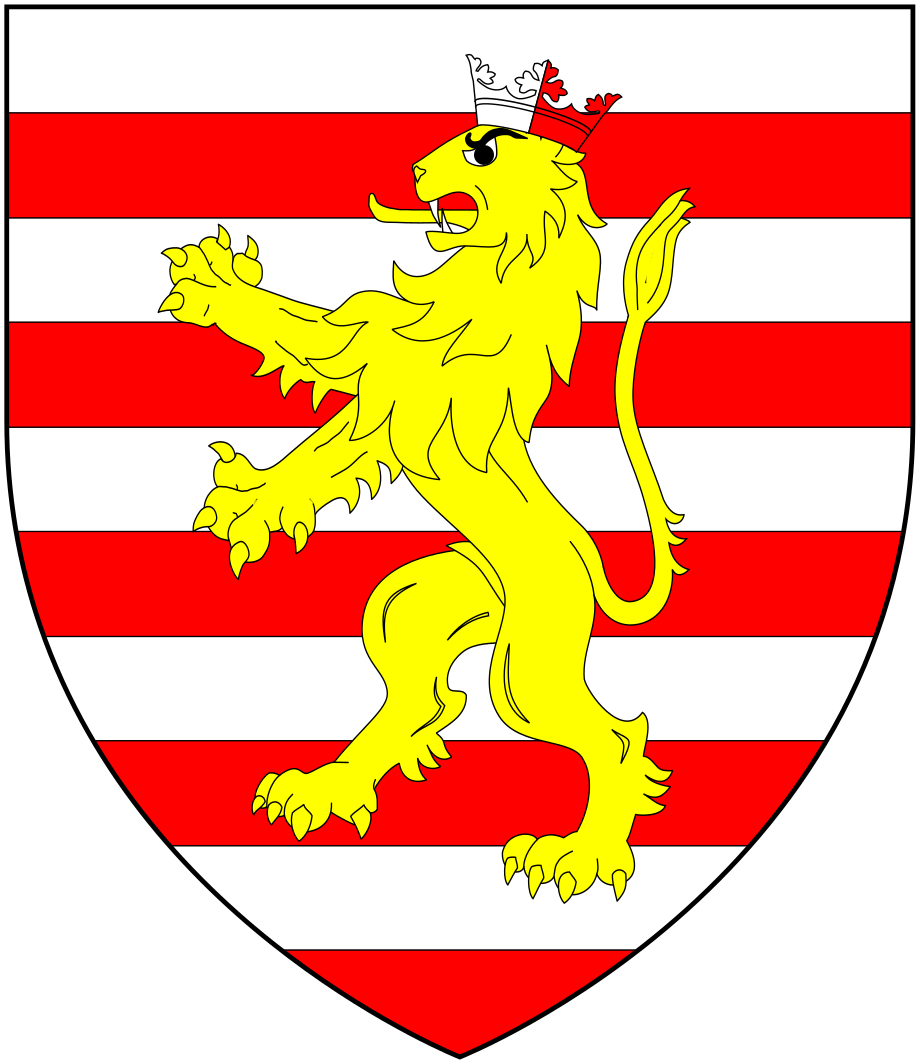
Arms of Brandon: Barry of ten argent and gules, a lion rampant or ducally crowned per pale of the first and second

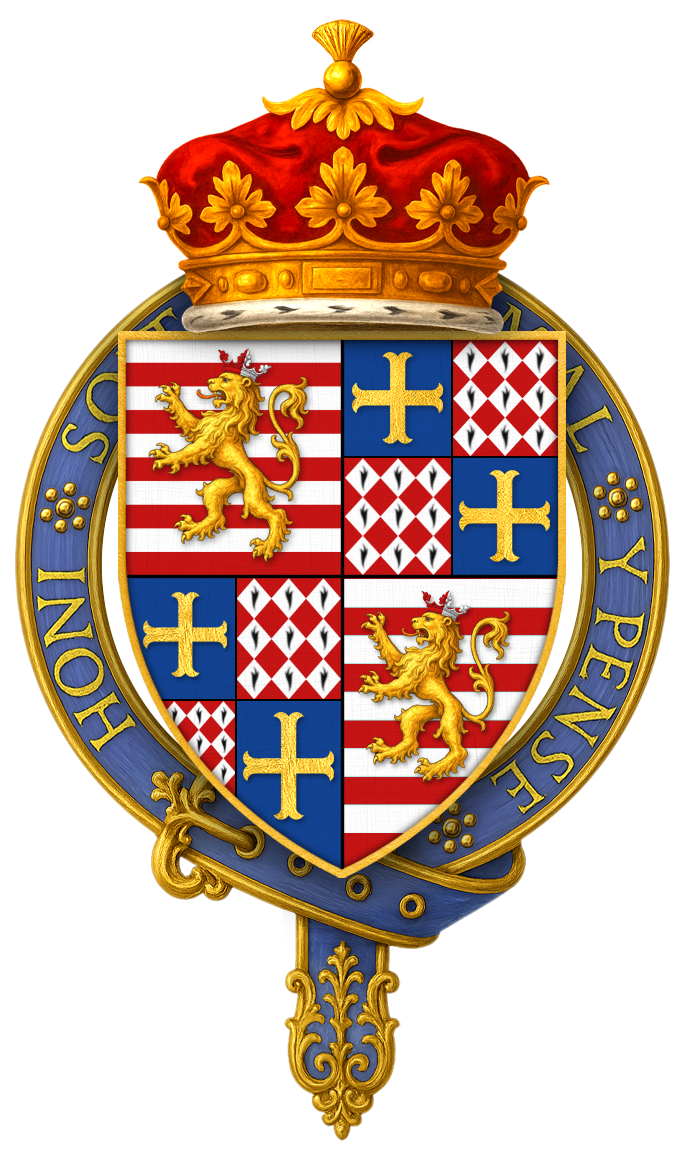
Quartered arms of Charles Brandon, 1st Duke of Suffolk

Charles Brandon, 1st Duke of Suffolk (c. 1484 – 22 August 1545) was an English military leader and courtier. Through his third wife, Mary Tudor, he was the brother-in-law of King Henry VIII.

== Biography ==
Born in 1484, Charles Brandon was the second but only surviving son of Sir William Brandon, Henry Tudor's standard-bearer at the Battle of Bosworth Field. William Brandon was killed during the battle. Charles Brandon's mother, Elizabeth Bruyn (d. March 1494), was the daughter and co-heiress of Sir Henry Bruyn (died 1461). (Note: Brandon's mother Elizabeth was a granddaughter of Sir Maurice Bruyn (d. 8 November 1466), and by Elizabeth Darcy (died c. 1471), daughter of Sir Robert Darcy of Maldon, Essex. Before her marriage to Sir William Brandon, Elizabeth (née Bruyn) had been the wife of Thomas Tyrrell (died c. 13 October 1473), esquire, son of Sir Thomas Tyrrell of Heron and Anne Marney. After Sir William Brandon's death at Bosworth, Elizabeth (née Bruyn) married William Mallory, esquire. Brandon had a brother, William (who didn't survive), and two sisters, Anne, who married firstly Sir John Shilston, and secondly Sir Gawain Carew, and Elizabeth.)

Charles Brandon was brought up at the court of Henry VII, and became Henry VIII's closest friend. He was about seven years older than Henry and was a role model for the young prince, especially after the death of his brother, Prince Arthur. Brandon was becoming an excellent jouster and a ladies' man and as such was an object of admiration for Henry. Brandon is described by Dugdale as "a person comely of stature, high of courage and conformity of disposition to King Henry VIII, with whom he became a great favourite." Brandon held a succession of offices in the royal household, becoming Master of the Horse in 1513, and received many valuable grants of land. On 15 May, he was created Viscount Lisle, having entered into a marriage contract with his eight-year-old ward, Elizabeth Grey, suo jure Viscountess Lisle. The contract was ended and the title was forfeited as a result of Brandon's marriage to Mary Tudor in 1515.

Creation of Duke of Suffolk Act 1513
- Act of Parliament
- Parliament of England
- Long title: An Act for the confirmation of letters patents made to the duke of Suffolk.
- Citation: 5 Hen. 8. c. 10 (Note: This is the citation in The Statutes of the Realm.); 5 Hen. 8. c. 2 Pr. (Note: This is the citation in The Statutes at Large.)
- Territorial extent: England and Wales

Dates
- Royal assent: 4 March 1514
- Commencement: 23 January 1514 (Note: Start of session.)
- Repealed: 31 July 1978
Other legislation
Repealed by	Statute Law (Repeals) Act 1978
Relates to	Creation of Duke of Norfolk Act 1513; Creation of Earl of Surrey Act 1513

Status: Repealed

Text of statute as originally enacted

He distinguished himself at the sieges of Thérouanne and Tournai in the French campaign of 1513. One of the agents of Margaret of Savoy, governor of the Netherlands, reminded her that Brandon was a "second king" and advised her to write him a pleasant letter. At this time, Henry VIII was secretly urging Margaret to marry Lisle, whom he created Duke of Suffolk on 4 March 1514, although he was careful to disclaim any complicity in the project to her father, Maximilian I, Holy Roman Emperor. When Brandon was made Duke of Suffolk, there were only two other dukes in the kingdom (Buckingham and Norfolk). After being made Duke of Suffolk, he continued to travel around that county so as to get to know the towns and villages and the local dignitaries. He mainly stayed at his family's homes, including Wingfield Castle and the now demolished Henham Hall.

After his marriage to Mary, Suffolk lived at Westhorpe Hall for some years in semi-retirement, but he was present at the Field of the Cloth of Gold in 1520, an event organised in part by his cousins Sir Richard Wingfield, who was English ambassador to France, and Thomas Wolsey, who was Cardinal and Lord Chancellor.

In 1523 he was sent to Calais to command the English troops there. He invaded France in company with Floris d'Egmont, Count of Buren, who was at the head of the Flemish troops, and laid waste the north of France, but disbanded his troops at the approach of winter.

Brandon was appointed Earl Marshal of England in 1524, a position previously held by Thomas Howard, 2nd Duke of Norfolk. However, in 1533 he relinquished the office to Thomas Howard, 3rd Duke of Norfolk, "whose auncesto[ur]s of longe tyme hadde the same until nowe of late."

After Wolsey's disgrace, Suffolk's influence increased. He was sent with Thomas Howard, 3rd Duke of Norfolk, to demand the Great Seal from Wolsey (it is possible Henry sent Brandon to Wolsey as they were related); and Suffolk acted as High Steward at the new Queen's coronation. He was one of the commissioners appointed by Henry to dismiss Catherine's household, a task he found distasteful.

His family had a residence on the west side of Borough High Street, London, for at least half a century prior to his building of Suffolk Place at the site.

Charles supported Henry's ecclesiastical policy, receiving a large share of the lands after the dissolution of the monasteries. In 1544, he was for the second time in command of an English army for the invasion of France. He died at Guildford, Surrey, on 22 August in the following year. At Henry VIII's expense he was buried at Windsor in St George's Chapel. Brandon was perhaps the only person in England who successfully retained Henry VIII's affection for most of a period of forty years.

=== Marriage to Mary Tudor ===
Charles Brandon took part in the jousts which celebrated the marriage of Mary Tudor, King Henry VIII's sister, with King Louis XII of France. On Louis XII's death in 1515, Brandon was sent to congratulate the new king, Francis I, and was accredited to negotiate various matters with him, including Dowager Queen Mary's return to England. Love had existed between Mary and Brandon before her marriage to Louis. Francis, perhaps in the hope of his wife Queen Claude's death, had been one of Mary's suitors in the first week of her widowhood, in which Mary had asserted that she had given him her confidence in order to avoid his overtures.

Francis I and Henry VIII both professed a friendly attitude towards the marriage of the lovers, but Brandon had many political enemies, and Mary feared that she might again be sacrificed for political considerations. The King's Council, not wishing to see Brandon gain further power at court, were opposed to the match. The truth was that Henry was anxious to obtain from Francis the gold plate and jewels that had been given or promised to Mary by Louis XII, as well as reimbursement of the expenses of her marriage with him; and Henry practically made his acceptance of Brandon's suit dependent on Brandon obtaining them. However, when Brandon was sent to bring Mary back to England, the King made him promise that he would not propose to her. Once in France though, Brandon was persuaded by Mary to abandon this pledge. The couple wed in secret at the Hotel de Clugny on 3 March 1515 in the presence of just 10 people, among whom was Francis I. Brandon announced their marriage to Thomas Wolsey, who was a kinsman and friend.

Technically, this was treason as Brandon had married a royal princess without the King's consent. Henry was outraged, and the privy council urged that Brandon should be imprisoned or executed. He was only saved from the King's anger by Wolsey smoothing things over and from the affection that the King had for both his sister and for him. The couple got off relatively lightly and were charged only with a heavy fine of £24,000 to be paid to the King in yearly instalments of £1000, as well as the whole of Mary's dowry from Louis XII of £200,000, together with her plate and jewels. Nonetheless, Henry later reduced the fine. The couple were then openly married at Greenwich Hall on 13 May 1515 in the presence of the King and his courtiers. The Duke of Suffolk already had been twice married, to Margaret Neville (the widow of John Mortimer) and to Anne Browne, to whom he had been betrothed before his marriage with Neville. Browne died in 1511, but Neville, from whom he had obtained a declaration of nullity on the ground of consanguinity, was still living. Brandon secured in 1528 a bull from Pope Clement VII that assured the legitimacy of his marriage with Mary Tudor.

Mary died on 25 June 1533, and in September of the same year, Brandon married his ward, the 14-year-old Katherine Willoughby (1519–1580), suo jure Baroness Willoughby de Eresby. Katherine had been betrothed to his eldest surviving son, Henry, Earl of Lincoln, but the boy was too young to marry. The Earl of Lincoln died in 1534.

With Willoughby, Brandon had his two youngest sons, who showed great promise: another Henry (1535–1551) and Charles (c. 1537–1551), who later became Dukes of Suffolk. However, they eventually died of the sweating sickness within an hour of each other.

Between 1536–1543, Brandon gave his London residence Suffolk Place, rebuilt by him in fine Renaissance style in 1522, to Henry VIII in exchange for Norwich Place on the Strand, London. He also leased Hoxne Hall at this time.

== Marriages and children ==
Before 7 February 1507, Charles Brandon firstly married Margaret Neville (born 1466), widow of Sir John Mortimer (d. before 12 November 1504), and daughter of John Neville, 1st Marquess of Montagu (slain at the Battle of Barnet) and Isabel Ingaldesthorpe (or Ingoldesthorpe), daughter and heiress of Sir Edmund Ingaldesthorpe (or Ingoldesthorpe) and Joanna Tiptoft. Charles and Margaret had no children. The marriage was declared void about 1527 by the Archdeaconry Court of London, and later by papal bull dated 12 May 1528. Margaret subsequently married Robert Downes, gentleman.

In early 1508, in a secret ceremony at Stepney, and later publicly at St Michael's, Cornhill, Charles secondly married Anne Browne, daughter of Sir Anthony Browne (Standard Bearer of England in 1485) and Eleanor Ughtred, and thus the stepdaughter of Margaret Neville's sister Lucy Neville. Eleanor Ughtred was the daughter of Sir Robert Ughtred (c. 1428 – c. 1487) of Kexby, North Yorkshire and Katherine Eure, daughter of Sir William Eure of Stokesley, Yorkshire. By Anne Browne, Charles had two daughters:

- Lady Anne Brandon (1507–1557), who married firstly Edward Grey, 3rd Baron Grey of Powis, and after the dissolution of this union, Randal Harworth.
- Lady Mary Brandon (1510–c. 1542), who married Thomas Stanley, 2nd Baron Monteagle.

Anne Browne died in 1511. The papal bull of 1528 also declared his two daughters by Anne Browne legitimate.

Charles was then contracted to marry Elizabeth Grey, 5th Baroness Lisle (1505–1519), and was thus created 1st Viscount Lisle of the third creation in 1513, but the contract was annulled, and he surrendered the title either before 1519 or in 1523.

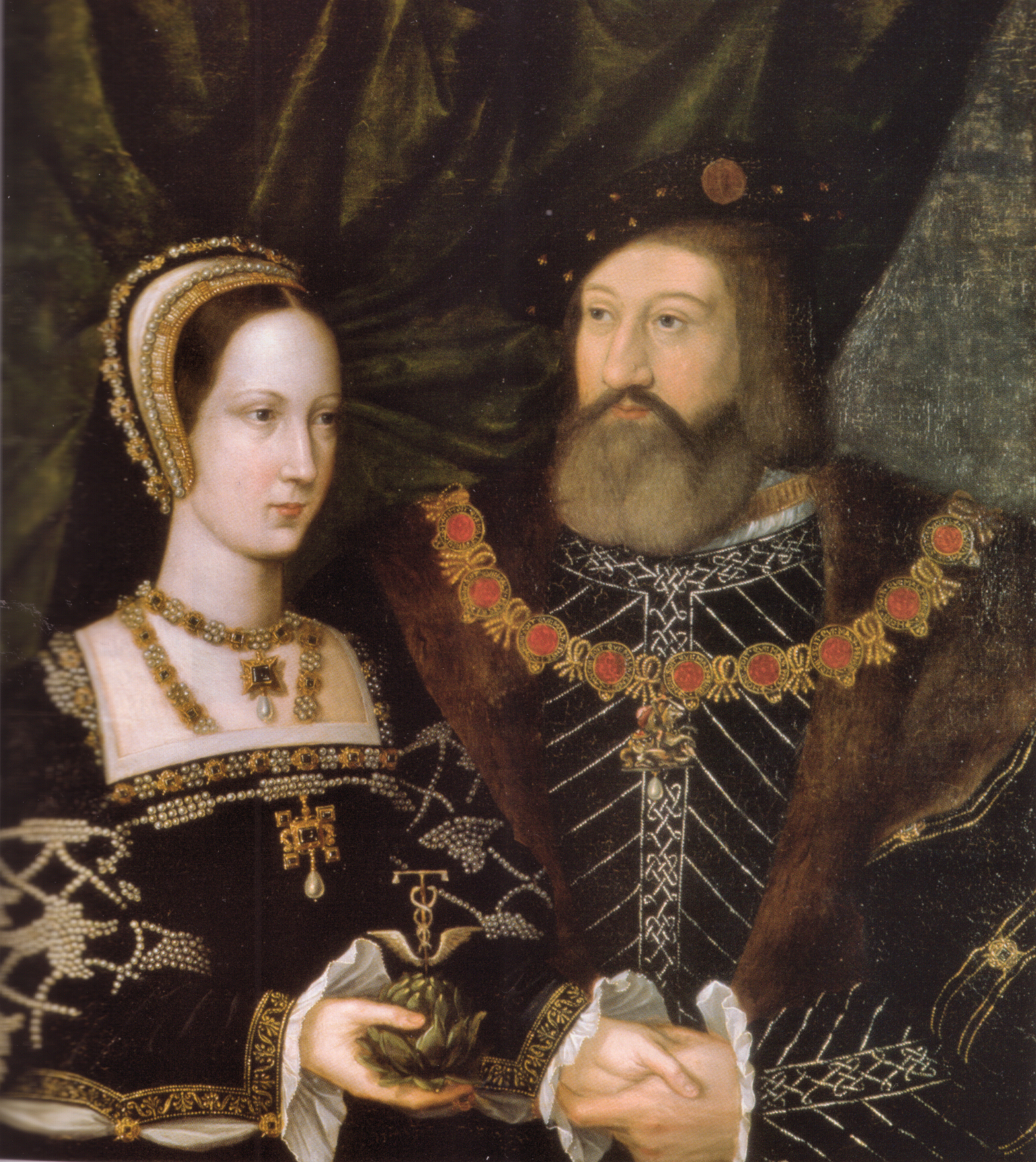
Wedding portrait of Mary Tudor and Charles Brandon

In May 1515, Charles thirdly married Mary Tudor, Queen Dowager of France (18 March 1496 – 25 June 1533). After their marriage, Charles and Mary resided at Westhorpe Hall, where they raised their four children:

- Lord Henry Brandon (11 March 1516 – 1522)
- Lady Frances Brandon (16 July 1517 – 20 November 1559), who married Henry Grey, Duke of Suffolk, 3rd Marquess of Dorset, by whom she was the mother of Lady Jane Grey.
- Lady Eleanor Brandon (1519 – 27 September 1547), who married Henry Clifford, 2nd Earl of Cumberland.
- Henry Brandon, 1st Earl of Lincoln (c. 1523 – 1 March 1534)

On 7 September 1533, little more than two months after Mary's death, Brandon married for the fourth time. His bride was Katherine Willoughby, 12th Baroness Willoughby de Eresby (22 March 1519 – 19 September 1580), the daughter and heiress of William Willoughby, 11th Baron Willoughby de Eresby and María de Salinas. They had two sons, both still children when Brandon died in 1545, and both of whom died of the sweating sickness on the same day in 1551:

- Henry Brandon, 2nd Duke of Suffolk (18 September 1535 – 14 July 1551)
- Charles Brandon, 3rd Duke of Suffolk (1537 – 14 July 1551)

Katherine married Richard Bertie in 1553, and had a son and a daughter by him.

Charles also had several illegitimate children:

- Sir Charles Brandon, who married Elizabeth Pigot, widow of Sir James Strangways.
- Frances Brandon, who married firstly William Sandon, and secondly Andrew Bilsby.
- Mary Brandon, who married Robert Ball of Scottow, Norfolk, the uncle of Temperance Flowerdew and John Pory.

== Later years and death ==
After becoming a widower in 1533 after his wife, Mary's, death, Brandon married Katherine Willoughby. At the end of that year, Brandon was dispatched to Buckden Towers by King Henry to see the King's former wife, Catherine of Aragon. The reason behind Brandon's visit was to inform Catherine that she would be moving to Somersham Palace and would no longer be styled as Queen, but the Dowager Princess of Wales (as the widow of Prince Arthur). Catherine refused both, locking herself in a room so she could not be moved to the "unhealthy" Somersham. Brandon was in a difficult situation. Both he and his late wife, Mary, had quietly supported Catherine's cause against Anne Boleyn and now Brandon's new mother-in-law was Maria de Salinas, former lady-in-waiting to Catherine. After Brandon left Buckden, it was decided to move Catherine to Kimbolton Castle which was healthier and which Catherine agreed to. Kimbolton was owned by Brandon's family, the Wingfields, and he may have suggested it to Henry in an attempt to placate Catherine.

As he was no longer Henry's brother-in-law, Henry persuaded Brandon to make his base in Lincolnshire where Katherine now owned her father's former castle, Grimsthorpe. On their marriage, Henry also gave them Vaudey Abbey, but he asked Brandon to give up his former home with Mary, Westhorpe Hall, as well as properties that belonged to Brandon's family, Wingfield Castle and Henham Hall. The reason Henry asked Brandon to move his base to Lincolnshire was to ease the tensions between the other major East Anglian family, the Howards. However, after the execution of Anne Boleyn in 1536, Brandon continued to receive East Anglian properties following the dissolution of the monasteries including Leiston Abbey and Eye Priory.

After the transfer of properties, Brandon, now based in Lincolnshire, enjoyed living at Tattershall Castle, although he also spent time at Grimsthorpe and built a new manor house at Spilsby. When in London, he resided at his properties, Suffolk Place or the Barbican.

In 1539, Henry made him Lord Steward of the Royal Household. A few years later, Brandon was involved with skirmishes and negotiations with the Scots, including the Battle of Solway Moss and the Rough Wooing. Later he was sent to France and was involved with the Siege of Boulogne.

Charles Brandon died on 22 August 1545 in Guildford aged 60. It was also the sixtieth anniversary of the Battle of Bosworth and the death of his own father. The King was deeply grieved at the death of his lifelong friend. Henry had already lost his two sisters and Brandon was the one remaining link to his childhood. When Brandon's death was announced at the Privy Council meeting, Henry professed that throughout their long friendship, Brandon had never attempted to hurt an adversary, nor had he ever said a word to injure anyone. He added “is there any of you, my Lords, who can say as much?”

Brandon's will requested a quiet funeral at Tattershall, however Henry ignored that and paid for an elaborate funeral at St. George's Chapel, Windsor where Jane Seymour was buried and Henry himself would later be buried there, next to his 3rd wife and close to his lifelong friend, in 1547.

== Fictional portrayals ==
- The romance between Mary Tudor and Charles Brandon is fictionalised in When Knighthood Was in Flower, by American author Charles Major writing under the pseudonym Edwin Caskoden. It was first published by The Bobbs-Merrill Company in 1898 and proved an enormous success. At least three films have been based on this novel.
  - A 1908 motion picture of the same name or under the title When Knights Were Bold was directed by Wallace McCutcheon. This is considered a lost film.
  - He is portrayed by Forrest Stanley in the 1922 film adaptation When Knighthood Was in Flower, directed by Robert G. Vignola.
  - Richard Todd portrayed Brandon in the 1953 Disney film The Sword and the Rose, an account of his romance with Mary Tudor in 1515.
- The Reluctant Queen by Molly Costain Haycraft presents another fictionalised version of the relationship between Brandon and Mary Tudor.
- Brandon was portrayed by actor Henry Cavill in the Showtime series The Tudors. In this series, he is incorrectly portrayed as being married to Margaret Tudor, when in fact he was married to Mary Tudor. He served as a confidant to his best friend Henry VIII, and therefore a number of Brandon's storylines are fictionalised for dramatic purposes. For example, he is married twice and is estranged from his second wife Katherine Willoughby Brandon, Duchess of Suffolk (Rebekah Wainwright). He takes on an official mistress, a French expatriate (played by Selma Brook), who cares for him up until his death. Also, he is shown only having one son Edward who is supposed to be one of his sons by Margaret as well as a son by Katherine here, Henry (Michael Winder), presumably a representation of Henry Brandon, 2nd Duke of Suffolk.
- He is a character in the novels Mary, Queen of France, The Lady in the Tower and The Shadow of the Pomegranate by Jean Plaidy.
- He appears as a character in the Man Booker Prize winning novel Wolf Hall by Hilary Mantel, and in its sequels, Bring Up the Bodies and The Mirror & the Light.
  - He is portrayed by actor Richard Dillane in the BBC drama Wolf Hall, based on Mantel's book.
- In the novel The Serpent Garden by Judith Merkle Riley, Brandon is portrayed as an immensely strong but rather dimwitted noble with a poor sense of spelling.
- Brian Blessed portrayed Suffolk in the film Henry VIII and His Six Wives (1972).
- Brandon is portrayed by actor Jordan Renzo in the 2019 Starz series The Spanish Princess based on the novels The Constant Princess and The King's Curse by Philippa Gregory.
- Brandon was portrayed fictitiously as the Marquess of Exeter in the comedy "The Secret Diary of Henry VIII", written by Stephen Hyde for British touring theatre company The Three Inch Fools in 2024.

== Sources ==
- Burke, John (1834). A Genealogical and Heraldic History of the Commoners of Great Britain and Ireland. Vol. I. London: Henry Colburn. p. 205.
- Cokayne, G.E. (1953). The Complete Peerage edited by Geoffrey H. White. Vol. XII (Part I). London: St. Catherine Press.
- Gunn, S.J. (2004). "Brandon, Charles, first duke of Suffolk (c. 1484–1545)". Oxford Dictionary of National Biography (online ed.). Oxford University Press. doi:10.1093/ref:odnb/3260. (Subscription, Wikipedia Library access or UK public library membership required.)
- Gunn, S.J. (1988). Charles Brandon, Duke of Suffolk c. 1484-1545. Oxford: Basil Blackwell. pp. 46–7. ISBN 0-631-15781-6.
- Richardson, Douglas (2011). Everingham, Kimball G. (ed.). Magna Carta Ancestry: A Study in Colonial and Medieval Families. Vol. I (2nd ed.). Salt Lake City. pp. 297–302. ISBN 978-1449966379.
- Richardson, Douglas (2011). Everingham, Kimball G. (ed.). Magna Carta Ancestry: A Study in Colonial and Medieval Families. Vol. II (2nd ed.). Salt Lake City. pp. 359–60, 455. ISBN 978-1449966386.
- Richardson, Douglas (2011). Everingham, Kimball G. (ed.). Magna Carta Ancestry: A Study in Colonial and Medieval Families. Vol. III (2nd ed.). Salt Lake City. pp. 225–6. ISBN 978-1449966393.
- Gunn, S.J. (2015). Charles Brandon: Henry VIII's Closest Friend. Stroud: Amberley Publishing. pp. Ixix. ISBN 978-1445641843.

Political offices
Preceded by The Duke of Norfolk	Earl Marshal; 1524–1533	Succeeded by The Duke of Norfolk
New office	Lord President of the Council; 1530–1545	Succeeded by The Lord St. John
Preceded by The Earl of Shrewsbury	Lord Steward; 1541–1544	Succeeded by The Lord St. John
Legal offices
Preceded by The Marquess of Dorset	Justice in Eyre; South of the Trent; 1534–1545	Succeeded by The Lord St. John
Peerage of England
New creation	Duke of Suffolk; 2nd creation 1514–1545	Succeeded by Henry Brandon
