= Duke of Suffolk =

Title in the Peerage of England

Dukedom of Suffolk
- Coat of arms Duke of Suffolk
- Creation date: 12 May 1448
- Creation: first Creation (1448) second Creation (1514) third Creation (1551)
- Created by: Henry VI
- Peerage: Peerage of England
- First holder: William de la Pole
- Present holder: Extinct
- Heir apparent: none
- Remainder to: the 1st Duke's heirs male of the body lawfully begotten
- Subsidiary titles: Marquess of Dorset; Marquess of Suffolk; Earl of Suffolk
- Extinction date: 1554
- Motto: Nous Maintiendrons ("We will maintain")

Duke of Suffolk is a title that has been created three times in the peerage of England.

The dukedom was first created for William de la Pole, who had already been elevated to the ranks of earl and marquess, and was a powerful figure under Henry VI.

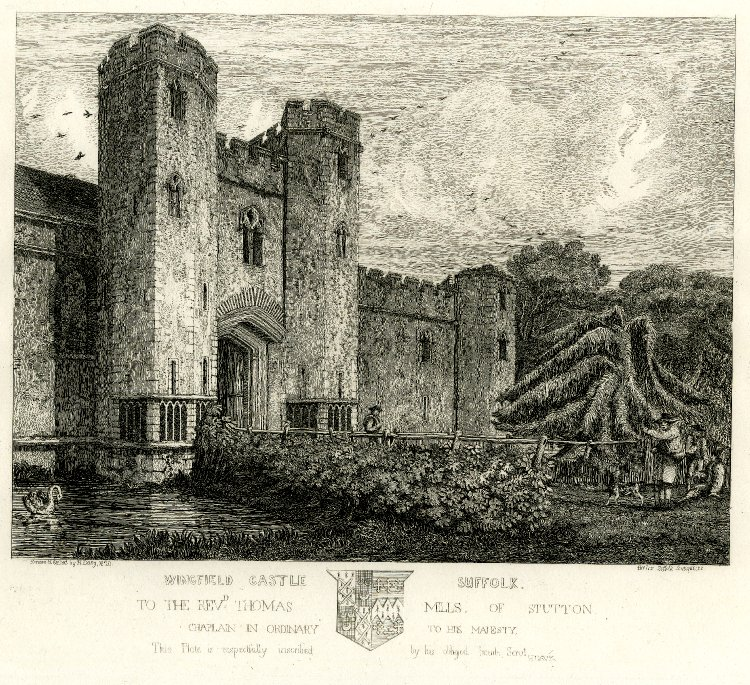
Wingfield Castle in Suffolk in 1827. It was the seat of Sir John de Wingfield (d. circa 1361), chief administrator to Edward the Black Prince (1330–1376), whose daughter and heiress Catherine Wingfield married Michael de la Pole, seated at Wingfield Castle and in 1385 created Earl of Suffolk. His descendants quartered the arms of Wingfield: Argent, on a bend gules three wings conjoined in lure of the field

The second creation was for Charles Brandon, a favourite of Henry VIII; his two sons successively inherited the title, but left no more heirs.

The third creation of the dukedom of Suffolk was for Henry Grey, 3rd Marquess of Dorset, in 1551. The duke also held the title Baron Ferrers of Groby (1300). These titles became forfeit when the duke was attainted in 1554.

== Duke of Suffolk, first creation ==
=== Earl of Suffolk (1385) ===
Arms of De la Pole: Azure, a fess between three leopard's faces or

- Michael de la Pole, 1st Earl of Suffolk (1330–1389), Lord Chancellor under Richard II, was stripped of his titles by the Merciless Parliament in 1388
- Michael de la Pole, 2nd Earl of Suffolk (1367–1415), son of the 1st Earl, obtained restoration to his father's title in 1398. They were again briefly forfeit in 1399, but almost immediately restored again in 1399
- Michael de la Pole, 3rd Earl of Suffolk (1394–1415), eldest son of the 2nd Earl, died without sons
- William de la Pole, 4th Earl of Suffolk (1396–1450), second son of the 2nd Earl, was created Marquess of Suffolk in 1444

=== Marquess of Suffolk (1444) ===
Subsidiary titles: Earl of Suffolk (1385), Earl of Pembroke (1447)

- William de la Pole, 1st Marquess of Suffolk (1396–1450) was created Duke of Suffolk in 1448

=== Duke of Suffolk (1448) ===
Subsidiary titles: Marquess of Suffolk (1444), Earl of Suffolk (1385), Earl of Pembroke (1447)

- William de la Pole, 1st Duke of Suffolk (1396–1450), arrested for his failures in France, his honours were forfeit in 1450
- John de la Pole, 2nd Duke of Suffolk (1442–1492), only son of the 1st Duke, was restored to his father's honours in 1463
  - John de la Pole, 1st Earl of Lincoln (1462/4–1487), eldest son of the 2nd Duke, predeceased his father without surviving issue
- Edmund de la Pole, 3rd Duke of Suffolk (1472–1513), younger son of the 2nd Duke, was allowed to succeed as Duke in 1492, but had to surrender that title in 1493. His earldom was forfeit in 1504

== Duke of Suffolk, second creation (1514) ==
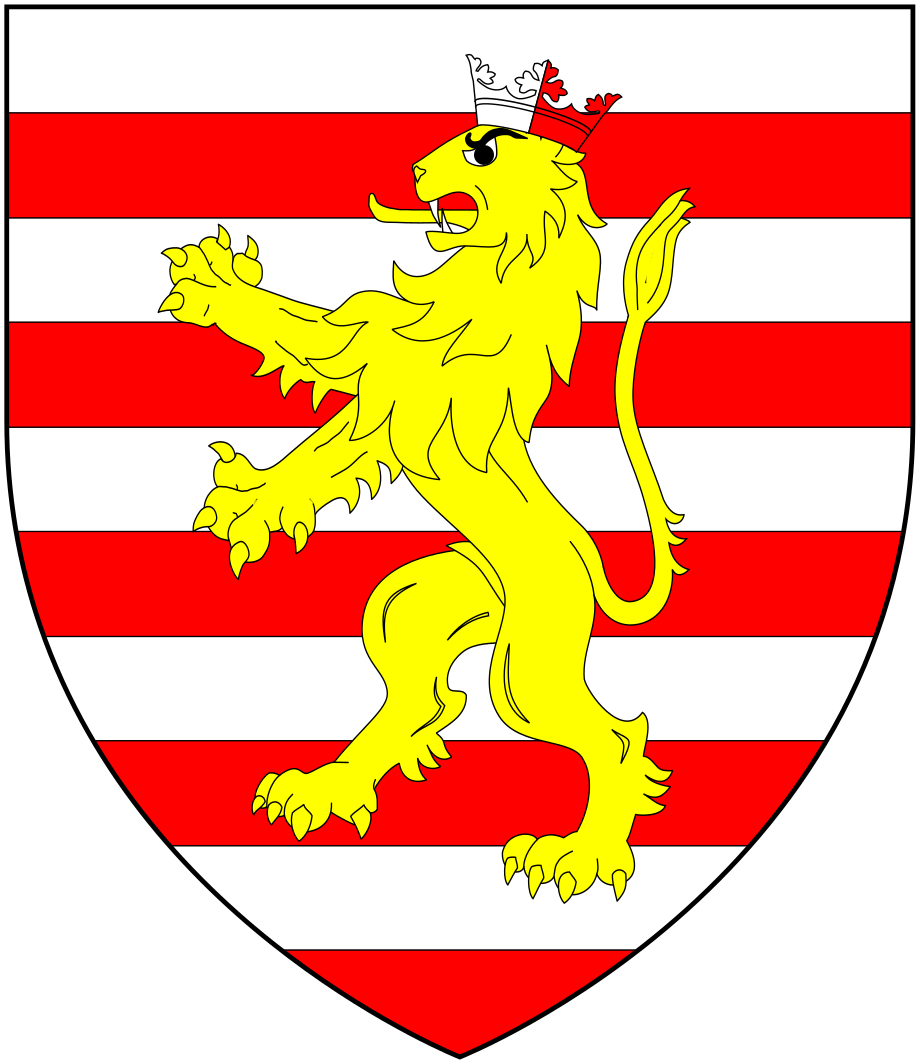
Arms of Brandon: Barry of ten argent and gules, a lion rampant or ducally crowned per pale of the first and second

- Charles Brandon, 1st Duke of Suffolk (1484–1545) was a favourite of Henry VIII
  - Henry Brandon (1516–1522) died at the age of six. Eldest son of the above.
  - Henry Brandon, 1st Earl of Lincoln (1523–1534), second son of the 1st Duke, predeceased his father, without issue. Younger brother of the above.
- Henry Brandon, 2nd Duke of Suffolk (1535–1551), third son of the 1st Duke, died in his youth of sweating sickness. Half-brother of the two Henrys above.
- Charles Brandon, 3rd Duke of Suffolk (1537–1551), fourth son of the 1st Duke, died very shortly after his brother the 2nd Duke also of sweating sickness, and their father's titles became extinct.

== Duke of Suffolk, third creation (1551) ==
Subsidiary titles: Marquess of Dorset (1475), Baron Ferrers of Groby (1300), Baron Harington (1324), Baron Bonville (1449)

- Henry Grey, Duke of Suffolk, 3rd Marquess of Dorset (1517–1554), married to Frances, a daughter of Charles Brandon, the first Duke of the second creation. He was notable as the father of Lady Jane Grey (de facto Queen of England for nine days). After his attempt to place his daughter on the throne failed, he was pardoned, but after his participation in Wyatt's Rebellion, Mary I had him executed for treason in February 1554. His honours were forfeit although, in any case, he had no male issue who would have inherited.

=== Grey arms ===
- Arms: Barry of six argent and azure, in chief three torteaux (roundels gules); a label of three points ermine.
- Crest: A unicorn salient, ermine, in front of the sun in splendour.
- Supporters: Dexter: a unicorn; sinister: a bull with a human face.

There were no further creations of the dukedom. The earldom of Suffolk was re-created in 1603 for a cadet branch of the Howard family.

== See also ==
- Earl of Suffolk
