= Henry Brandon, 2nd Duke of Suffolk =

English nobleman

His Grace The Duke of Suffolk
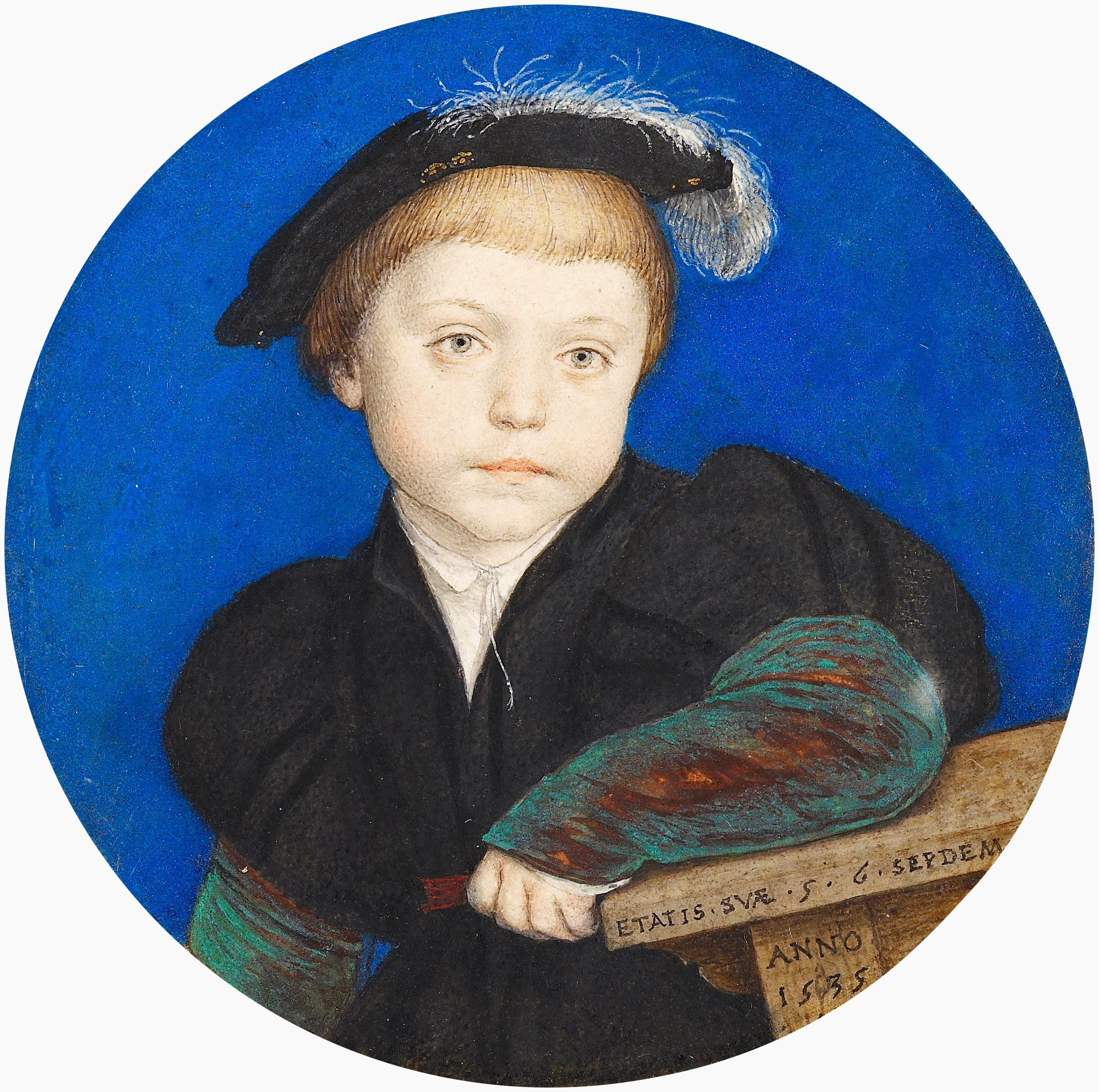
- Henry Brandon, portrait miniature by Hans Holbein the Younger, 1541

Duke of Suffolk
- In office 22 August 1545 – 14 July 1551
- Preceded by: Charles Brandon
- Succeeded by: Charles Brandon

Personal details
- Born: 18 September 1535
- Died: 14 July 1551 (aged 15) Bishop of Lincoln's Palace, Buckden
- Parent(s): Charles Brandon, 1st Duke of Suffolk; Catherine Willoughby
- Education: St John's College, Cambridge

Henry Brandon, 2nd Duke of Suffolk (18 September 1535 – 14 July 1551), styled Lord Henry Brandon before 1545, was an English nobleman, the son of Charles Brandon, 1st Duke of Suffolk, by his fourth wife, Catherine Willoughby.

His father had previously been married to Mary Tudor, sister of King Henry VIII. Following the deaths of Mary and their son, Henry Brandon, Earl of Lincoln, Charles had married Catherine, Lady Willoughby de Eresby, who had been the intended bride of the elder Henry.

In 1541, Lord Henry Brandon and his younger brother Lord Charles Brandon had their miniatures painted by Hans Holbein the Younger.

Lord Brandon succeeded his father as 2nd Duke of Suffolk on 22 August 1545. He and his younger brother were both minors and continued their education by going up to St John's College, Cambridge. During an epidemic of the sweating sickness, the two youths died, Suffolk first and his younger brother was said to have died half an hour later. They died at the Bishop of Lincoln's Palace in the village of Buckden, near Huntingdon, Huntingdonshire, where they had fled in an attempt to escape the epidemic.

A solemn celebration of the funerals of the two Dukes, called a 'Month's Mind', was held on 22 September 1551 with all the funeral equipment in duplicate. The humanist intellectuals Thomas Wilson and Walter Haddon wrote a life of Suffolk and his younger brother shortly after their death.

Peerage of England
Preceded by Charles Brandon	Duke of Suffolk; 1545–1551	Succeeded by Charles Brandon
