= William Brandon (died 1491) =

English soldier and courtier

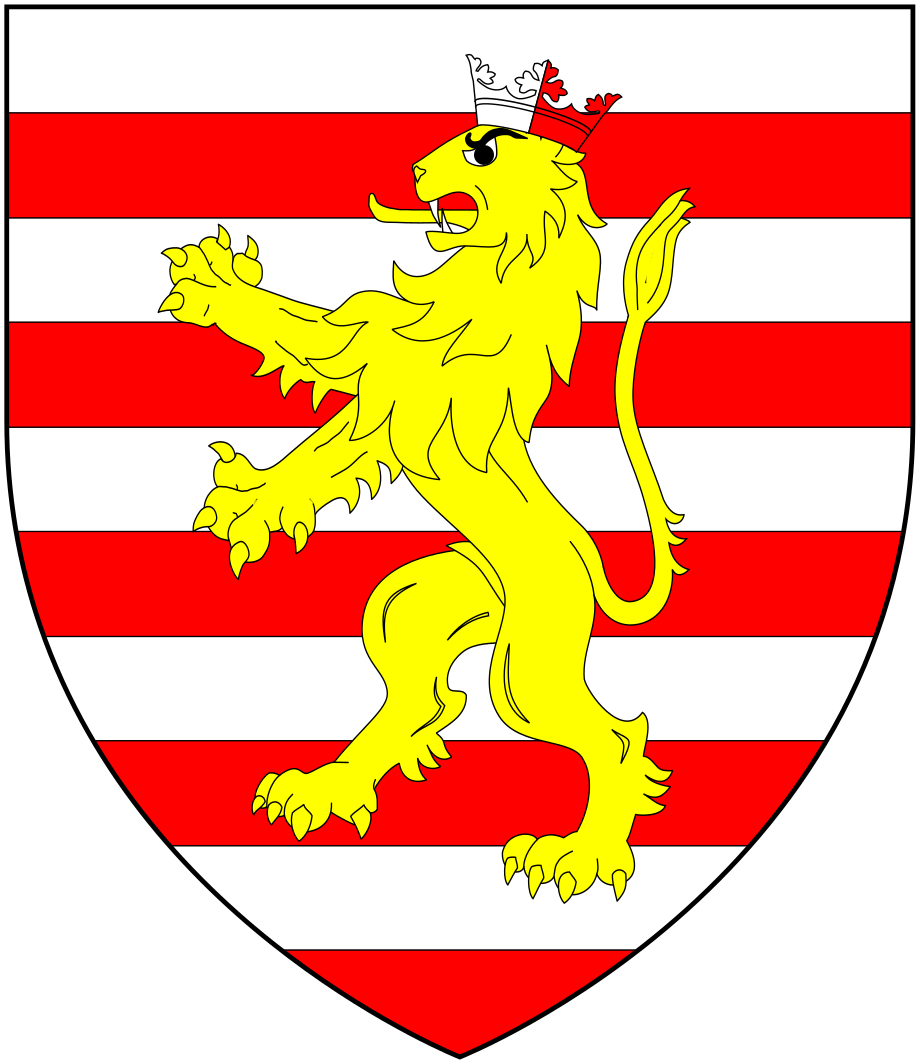
Arms of Brandon: Barry of ten argent and gules, a lion rampant or ducally crowned per pale of the first and second

Sir William Brandon (died 1491), of Wangford in Suffolk, was an English landowner, administrator, soldier, courtier and politician. His grandson was Charles Brandon, 1st Duke of Suffolk, a courtier and close friend of King Henry VIII.

== Origins ==
Born before 1430, he was probably the son of Robert Brandon, collector of customs at King's Lynn and Great Yarmouth, in Norfolk, who served as a member of parliament for Bishop's Lynn in 1421.

== Career ==
He became a retainer of the local magnates, the Dukes of Norfolk, rising to be a senior member of the council of John de Mowbray, 4th Duke of Norfolk by 1476. In 1454–55 he acted as escheator for Norfolk and Suffolk, and in 1468 he sat as a member of parliament for New Shoreham.

In 1469 he was present at the Siege of Caister Castle, and in 1471 as a member of the victorious Yorkist forces he was knighted by King Edward IV on the field at the Battle of Tewkesbury. In 1471 he was one of ten knights who swore allegiance to the Prince of Wales, the future King Edward V.

In 1475 he returned to military service in the invasion of France, which ended with the Treaty of Picquigny. As a member of the Royal Household, in 1479 he was appointed Knight Marshal of the Marshalsea Court, an office for life which passed to his son Thomas in 1491.

In July 1483 he was present at the coronation of King Richard III, but despite marks of royal favour his loyalty became suspect when two of his sons, William and Thomas, joined the rebellion of Henry Stafford, 2nd Duke of Buckingham in October. Some of his lands were seized by Thomas Hopton on the King's orders, but he secured a free pardon in March 1484. By the end of that year, he was out of favour again and sought sanctuary in the City of Gloucester, where he remained until after Richard's defeat and death at the Battle of Bosworth in August 1485. Later that year he petitioned Parliament for, and regained, his office of Knight Marshal.

== Marriage and children ==
Before January 1462 he married Elizabeth Wingfield (d. 28 April 1497), a daughter of Sir Robert Wingfield by his wife Elizabeth Goushill, half-sister of John de Mowbray, 2nd Duke of Norfolk. Elizabeth, who survived William, had three sons and seven daughters by him:

- Sir William Brandon, eldest son and heir, who married Elizabeth Bruyn, a daughter and co-heiress of Sir Henry Bruyn and widow of Thomas Tyrrell of Heron, Essex. One of their sons was Charles Brandon, 1st Duke of Suffolk, a courtier and close friend of King Henry VIII.
- Sir Thomas Brandon, who married firstly Anne Fiennes, a daughter of Sir John Fiennes and widow of William Berkeley, 1st Marquess of Berkeley and secondly Elizabeth Dinham, a daughter of Sir John Dinham and widow successively of Fulk Bourchier, 10th Baron FitzWarin and Sir John Sapcotes.
- Sir Robert Brandon, who married Catharine la Zouche, a daughter of John Zouche, 7th Baron Zouche of Haryngworth. and widow of John Carew (d. 1528).
- Mary Brandon, who became a gentlewoman in the household of Prince Henry, later King Henry VIII, and married John Reading, Henry VII's treasurer.
- Anne Brandon, who married Nicholas Sidney and was the mother of Sir William Sidney.
- Elizabeth Brandon, who married firstly Augustine Cavendish and secondly John Leventhorpe.
- Margaret Brandon "The Elder", who married Sir Gregory Lovell.
- Margaret Brandon "The Younger", who married Hugh Manning.
- Catherine Brandon, who married John Gurney.
- Eleanor Brandon (died 30 June 1480), who after 5 March 1466 married (as his second wife) John Glemham.

== Landholdings ==
He held lands in Suffolk at Framlingham, Henham, and Wangford; in Cambridgeshire at Soham, and at Southwark, where he had a residence on Borough High Street, across the River Thames from the Tower of London, near Ely Palace and the main artery from London Bridge to Canterbury and Dover. His seat is memorialised by today's Suffolk Street, named after his grandson the Duke of Suffolk.

== Death and burial ==
He left a will dated 9 April 1491 which was proved on 17 November 1491, requesting burial at Wangford.

== Sources ==
- Burke, John (1834). A Genealogical and Heraldic History of the Commoners of Great Britain and Ireland. Vol. I. London: Henry Colburn. p. 205.
- Cokayne, G. E. (1912). Gibbs, Vicary (ed.). The Complete Peerage of England, Scotland, Ireland, Great Britain and the United Kingdom, extant, extinct or dormant (Bass to Canning). Vol. 2 (2nd ed.). London: The St Catherine Press.
- Cokayne, George Edward (1926). The Complete Peerage, edited by Vicary Gibbs and H.A. Doubleday. Vol. V. London: St Catherine Press. p. 510.
- Gunn, S. J. (1988). Charles Brandon, Duke of Suffolk c.1484–1545. Oxford / Basil Blackwell.
- Gunn, S. J. (2004). "Brandon, Sir Thomas (d. 1510)". Oxford Dictionary of National Biography (online ed.). Oxford University Press. doi:10.1093/ref:odnb/3268. (Subscription, Wikipedia Library access or UK public library membership required.)
- Rendle, William (1878). Old Southwark and Its People. Southwark: W. Dewett. pp. 100–1.
- Richardson, Douglas (2011a). Everingham, Kimball G. (ed.). Magna Carta Ancestry: A Study in Colonial and Medieval Families. Vol. I (2nd ed.). Salt Lake City. ISBN 978-1-4499-6637-9.
- Richardson, Douglas (2011b). Everingham, Kimball G. (ed.). Magna Carta Ancestry: A Study in Colonial and Medieval Families. Vol. II (2nd ed.). Salt Lake City. ISBN 978-1-4499-6638-6.
- Timbs, John (1872). Gunn, Alexander (ed.). Abbeys, Castles and Ancient Halls of England and Wales (Revised ed.). Southwark: Frederick Warne. p. 195.
- Wright, James (1684). The History and Antiquities of the County of Rutland. London: Bennet Griffin. p. 126.
