= Thomas Brandon (diplomat) =

English soldier, courtier and diplomat

Sir Thomas Brandon
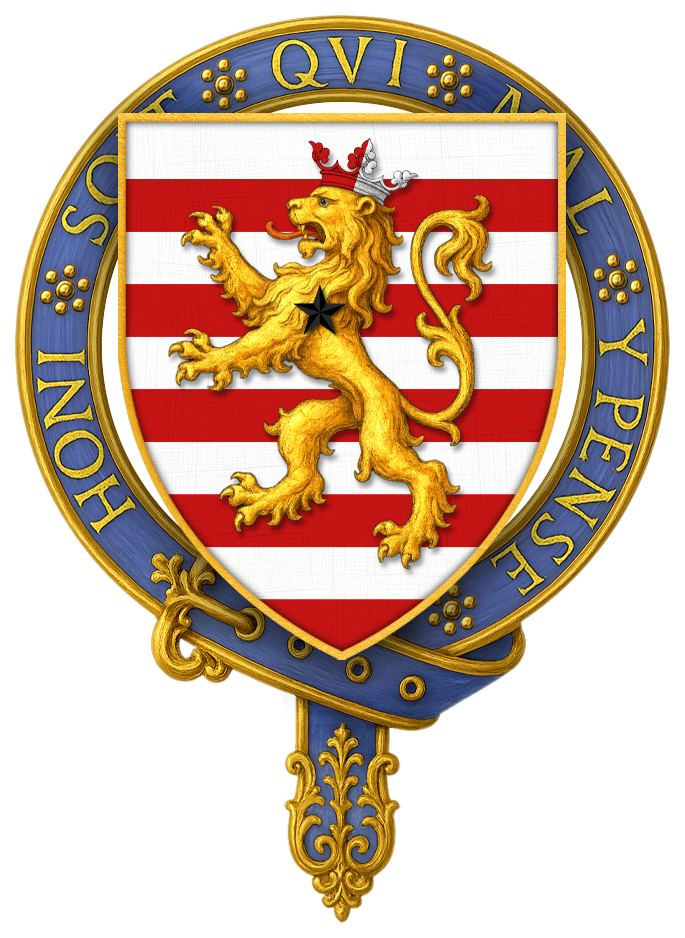
- Arms of Sir Thomas Brandon, KG
- Died: 27 January 1510
- Buried: Blackfriars, London
- Spouses: Anne Fiennes; Elizabeth Dynham
- Father: Sir William Brandon
- Mother: Elizabeth Wingfield

Sir Thomas Brandon, of Southwark, Surrey, and of Duddington, Northamptonshire (died 27 January 1510) was an English soldier, courtier and diplomat.

== Life ==
He was from a Lancastrian family, the son of William Brandon (died 1491) of Southwark and Elizabeth Wingfield (died 1497), daughter of Sir Robert Wingfield of Letheringham, Suffolk. He was uncle to Charles Brandon, 1st Duke of Suffolk. His brother, William, was killed at the battle of Bosworth defending the standard of the future Henry VII. A contemporary manuscript speaks of Sir Thomas as having 'greatly favoured and followed the party of Henry, earl of Richmond.’

He was appointed to the embassy charged with concluding peace with France in 1492, and again in 1500 he formed one of the suites which accompanied Henry VII to Calais to meet the Archduke Philip of Austria. In 1503, together with Nicholas West, he was given the mission of concluding a treaty with the Emperor Maximilian at Antwerp. The main object of this treaty was to induce Maximilian to withdraw his support from Edmund de la Pole, 3rd Duke of Suffolk, and banish him and the other English rebels from his dominions. Other points touched upon were the treatment of Milan and the question of Maximilian receiving the Order of the Garter. Maximilian was indecisive and allowed the English ambassadors to leave.

On his return to England, Brandon was given offices, including master of the king's horse. He was noted for his prowess as a knight and his skill in military affairs. In the records of a tournament held in 1494 to celebrate the creation of the Prince Henry as Knight of the Bath and Duke of York, Brandon is mentioned as having distinguished himself. He was made a Knight of the Garter.

In October 1507 he was sent to meet Balthasar de Castiglione, ambassador for the Duke of Urbino, who came to England to receive the Garter for his master. Brandon died on 27 January 1510.

== Marriages and issue ==
Brandon married firstly, before 16 May 1496, Anne Fiennes (died 10 September 1497), widow of William Berkeley, 1st Marquess of Berkeley (died 14 February 1492). She was the daughter of Sir John Fiennes by Alice FitzHugh, daughter of Sir Henry FitzHugh, 5th Baron FitzHugh, and Lady Alice Neville, sister of Richard Neville, 16th Earl of Warwick ("Warwick, the Kingmaker"). By her father, she was the granddaughter of Richard Fiennes, 7th Baron Dacre of the South (died 1483). There was no issue from the marriage. She died on 10 September 1497 and was buried at St George's Chapel, Windsor Castle.

Brandon married secondly, Elizabeth Dynham (died 19 October 1516), widow of Fulk Bourchier, 10th Baron FitzWarin (25 October 1445 – 18 September 1479) and of Sir John Sapcote (died 1501) of Elton, Huntingdonshire. She was the daughter of Sir John Dinham (1406–1458) by Joan Arches (died 1497), and the sister and coheir of John Dynham, 1st Baron Dynham (died 1501). According to Gunn, after Brandon's death his widow, Elizabeth, took a vow of celibacy before Bishop Fisher on 21 April 1510. She died 19 October 1516, and was buried in the Greyfriars, London.

== Notes ==
Legal offices
Preceded by The 8th Baron Daubeney	Justice in Eyre; South of the Trent; 1509–1510	Succeeded by Sir Thomas Lovell
