= Lionel Powys-Maurice =

English cricketer

Lionel Selwyn Powys-Maurice was an English cricketer active from 1922 to 1923 who played for Northamptonshire (Northants). He was born in Brighton on 7 May 1899 and died in Buckden, Huntingdonshire on 8 January 1991. He changed his name to Lionel Selwyn Maurice in 1923. Powys-Maurice appeared in eleven first-class matches as a righthanded batsman. He scored 156 runs with a highest score of 65.
