= William Brandon (standard-bearer) =

English knight (1456–1485)

Sir William Brandon
- Born: 1456
- Died: 22 August 1485 (aged 28–29); Near Ambion Hill, Market Bosworth, England
- Relatives: Sir William Brandon (father); Charles Brandon, 1st Duke of Suffolk (son); Sir Thomas Brandon (brother)
- Military career
- Allegiance: Henry Tudor
- Rank: Standard-bearer
- Units: House of Lancaster
- Conflicts: War of the Roses: Battle of Bosworth

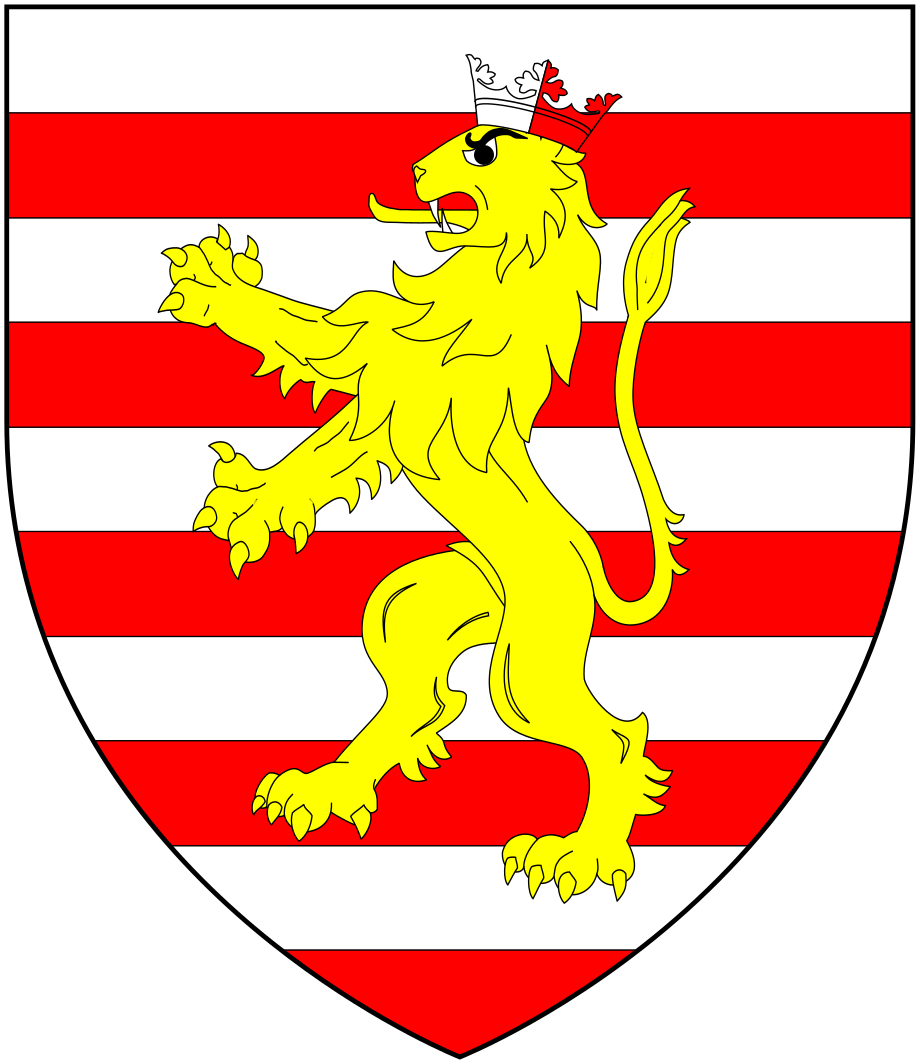
Arms of Brandon: Barry of ten argent and gules, a lion rampant or ducally crowned per pale of the first and second

Sir William Brandon (1456 – 22 August 1485) of Soham, Cambridgeshire was Henry Tudor's standard-bearer at the Battle of Bosworth, where he was killed by King Richard III. He was the father of Charles Brandon, 1st Duke of Suffolk.

== Biography ==
William was the son of Sir William Brandon of Wangford, Suffolk, and of Soham, Cambridgeshire, Knight Marshal of Marshalsea (1425 – 4 March 1491) and wife (married 1462) Elizabeth Wingfield (died 28 April 1496/1497). He had numerous siblings, including Sir Thomas Brandon, who fought with him at the Battle of Bosworth and later became a leading courtier and Master of the Horse of Henry VII. This was one of the most senior positions at court.

A few years later Brandon was one of the key London connections behind the Buckingham Revolt of 1483, along with his brother Thomas and brother-in-law, Wingfield.

In March 1484, he boarded a ship at Mersea in November and sailed for France, where he was supposedly joined by his wife, who gave birth to their eldest son in Paris. He joined his brother Thomas in the relief of the Hammes fortress.

== Battle of Bosworth and death ==
The Royal Standard of Henry Tudor at the Battle of Bosworth.

At the Battle of Bosworth, William formed part of Henry Tudor's personal entourage, performing the role of royal standard bearer. According to Bryson's writings "it is unclear exactly why Brandon was chosen to carry one of Henry Tudor’s standards; perhaps it was due to his unfaltering loyalty to the man he hoped would become king, or perhaps it was down to his physical toughness. We have no description of what Sir William Brandon II looked like, but his son Charles grew up to be tall, handsome, well built and extremely suited to physical pastimes such as hunting and jousting – all qualities that he may have inherited from his father." In addition to this it was well-known in various writings, including Bryson's, that William Brandon has a strong personality which could dominate and influence senior members of the aristocracy. It may have been this, along with charisma, that made Henry choose him as standard bearer.

When Richard III launched his final charge, he personally unhorsed two men we know by name: Brandon and Sir John Cheney, a well-known jousting champion. While Cheyne lived, Brandon became the most notable victim of the charge, killed by Richard while defending the standard. As such he appears in stanzas 155 and 156 in The Ballad of Bosworth:

amongst all other Knights, remember
which were hardy, & therto wight;
Sir william Brandon was one of those,
King Heneryes Standard he kept on height,

& vanted itt with manhood & might
vntill with dints hee was dr(i)uen downe,
& dyed like an ancyent Knight,
with HENERY of England that ware the crowne.

—Bosworth Ffeilde, anonymous author

According to popular myth William and his brother were both knighted by Henry Tudor when he landed at Milford in 1485, however Thomas was only knighted after the Battle of Blackheath in 1497 and William was presumably only called "Sir William" out of courtesy after his death, or out of confusion with his father, the elder Sir William.

== Family ==
Some time before 4 November 1474/1475 Brandon married Elizabeth Bruyn, daughter and co-heiress of Sir Henry Bruyn of South Ockendon, Essex, and wife Elizabeth Darcy, himself the son of Sir Maurice Bruyn. She was the widow of Thomas Tyrrell of Heron, Essex, whom she had married before 17 February 1461/1462, and who died after 3 July 1471, c. 13 October 1473, of the City of London, of Beckenham, Kent and of South Ockendon, Essex. She was a granddaughter of Sir Maurice Bruyn (d. 1466), and daughter and co-heiress of Sir Henry Bruyn (d. 1461) by Elizabeth Darcy (died c. 1471), daughter of Sir Robert Darcy of Maldon, Essex. Elizabeth Bruyn's paternal aunt, Joan Bruyn, married John Digges, great-grandfather of the scientist, Leonard Digges. On her father's side Elizabeth Bruyn was descended from Sir William le Brune, Knight Chamberlain to King Edward I. After William Brandon's death at the Battle of Bosworth on 22 August 1485, she married William Mallory or Mallery, Esq., whom she survived. She died 7 or 26 March 1493/1494.

By Elizabeth Bruyn, William Brandon had two sons and a daughter (the actual order of birth is not known):

- William Brandon (d. before 1500).
- Charles Brandon, 1st Duke of Suffolk (ca. 1484 – 24 August 1545).
- Anne Brandon, married firstly Sir John Shilston, and secondly Sir Gawain Carew.

Brandon also had two illegitimate daughters, Katherine, who married Roger Wolrich, and Elizabeth. William Brandon's sister was Mary Brandon who was the wife of John Reading (Reding) who was the treasurer of the King of England Henry VII.
