= Picardy sweat =

Infectious disease

- Specialty: Infectious disease

The Picardy sweat was an infectious disease of unknown cause and one of the only diseases that resemble the English sweating sickness. Both diseases are considered possible examples of hantavirus infections. The Picardy sweat is also known as the miliary fever, suette des Picards in French, and picard'scher Schweiß, picard'sches Schweissfieber, or Frieselfieber in German.

== History ==
It appeared in the northern French province of Picardy in 1718. The Picardy sweat was mainly confined to the northwest part of France, particularly in the provinces of Seine-et-Oise, Bas Rhin, and Oise. Although the Picardy sweat began in Northern France, outbreaks also occurred in Germany, Belgium, Switzerland, Austria, and Italy. Between 1718 and 1874, 194 epidemics of the Picardy sweat were recorded. The last extensive outbreak was in 1906, which a French commission attributed to fleas from field mice. A subsequent case was diagnosed in 1918 in a soldier in Picardy.

There were two types of the Picardy sweat, a benign form that was similar to nephropathia epidemica, or milder cases of hantavirus infection, and a more severe form that resembled the English sweating sickness. Similar to the English sweat, the Picardy sweat was characterized by intense sweating, but the symptoms were less often fatal. Other symptoms were high fever, rash, and nose bleeding. More severe symptoms included intense sweating, headaches, suffocation, precordial pain, anxiety, and "passion of the heart" or palpitations. Unlike the English sweating sickness, a miliary rash followed by desquamation, or peeling of the skin, often appeared three to four days after infection. The rate of sickness was anywhere from 25% to 30% of the population and the mortality rate is estimated to have been between 0% and 20%.

== André Chantemesse ==
The Picardy sweat occurred in limited epidemics, usually for a short duration during the summer months. Additionally, this disease spread predominately in rural villages and communities. André Chantemesse, a French bacteriologist, presented a detailed epidemiological account of the outbreak. Chantemesse argued against human-to-human transmission by discussing specific visits of ill individuals to nearby villages. Additionally, he believed that those who slept on or near the ground were more likely to be infected. Chantemesse called the Picardy sweat, "the virus that came from the fields." Although symptomatology did not match, he believed that this disease was transmitted through flea bites and predicted that the virus came from rodents invading homes after flooding.

== Related illnesses ==
The English sweating sickness, also known as Sudor Anglicus, caused five major epidemics between 1485–1551. The location, duration, and violence differed with each respective outbreak. This sickness, named after its primary symptom, had a mortality rate of 30% to 50%. The English sweating sickness mostly did not attack younger or older individuals, but rather the middle-aged individuals in the population. Additionally, these individuals were typically active, wealthy, and white males. The Picardy sweat appeared over 150 years later, in 1718, in France. This outbreak was less fatal than the English sweating sickness. Although there is much speculation about the similarities between the Picardy sweat and the English sweating sickness, it is unknown whether the two were related. One theory is that both could be a form of what we know today as hantavirus infections. Hantaviruses are mainly spread through rodents, insectivores, and bats and cause varied disease syndromes. Each type of hantavirus is carried by a specific host species and phylogenetic analysis revealed that the relationships between hantaviruses generally parallel the phylogeny of their rodent hosts.

== Treatment ==
The Picardy sweat disease was previously believed to arise from a leaven or a poison that would directly contaminate the blood. Due to this, physicians during this time suggested expelling the disease through sudorifics, cordials, ptisans, and heavy bedclothes. Sudorifics and heavy bedclothes were suggested because they induce sweating, theoretically allowing the disease-causing agent to exit the blood via the sweat glands, thus resulting in the expulsion of the disease. Cordials were presented to infected individuals because they were believed to sterilize the body and blood due to their alcohol content.

According to an article by a Dr. Meniere published in the Boston Medical Journal in 1833, doctors began to propose quite different treatments around 1773. Venesection procedures, mild lukewarm drinks, small doses of hypnotic medicine, and withdrawing practices on the hands and feet were suggested as more efficient treatments. Venesection procedures, or bloodletting, would directly remove blood from the body and was thought to be most efficient in the early stages of infection. Hypnotic medicines were suggested to aid in sleeping and provide some relief during the night. Mild anti-inflammatory agents were also suggested, including warm mustard baths for the hands and feet. Meniere emphasized the role these treatments had in speeding up the appearance of the rash, a later stage of the disease which was associated with imminent recovery.

Another treatment for the Picardy sweat disease during this time was quinine sulfate. Physicians would prescribe doses of 3 grams or less of quinine sulfate to affected patients. Quinine sulfate was used as a treatment against malaria, which also causes severe fevers and sweating. Quinine's medicinal properties were well known by the 19th century, and along with other effects could induce sweating and cause easy bleeding.
