= Buckden Towers =

Former bishop's palace in Cambridgeshire

- Buckden; Near Huntingdon, Cambridgeshire in England
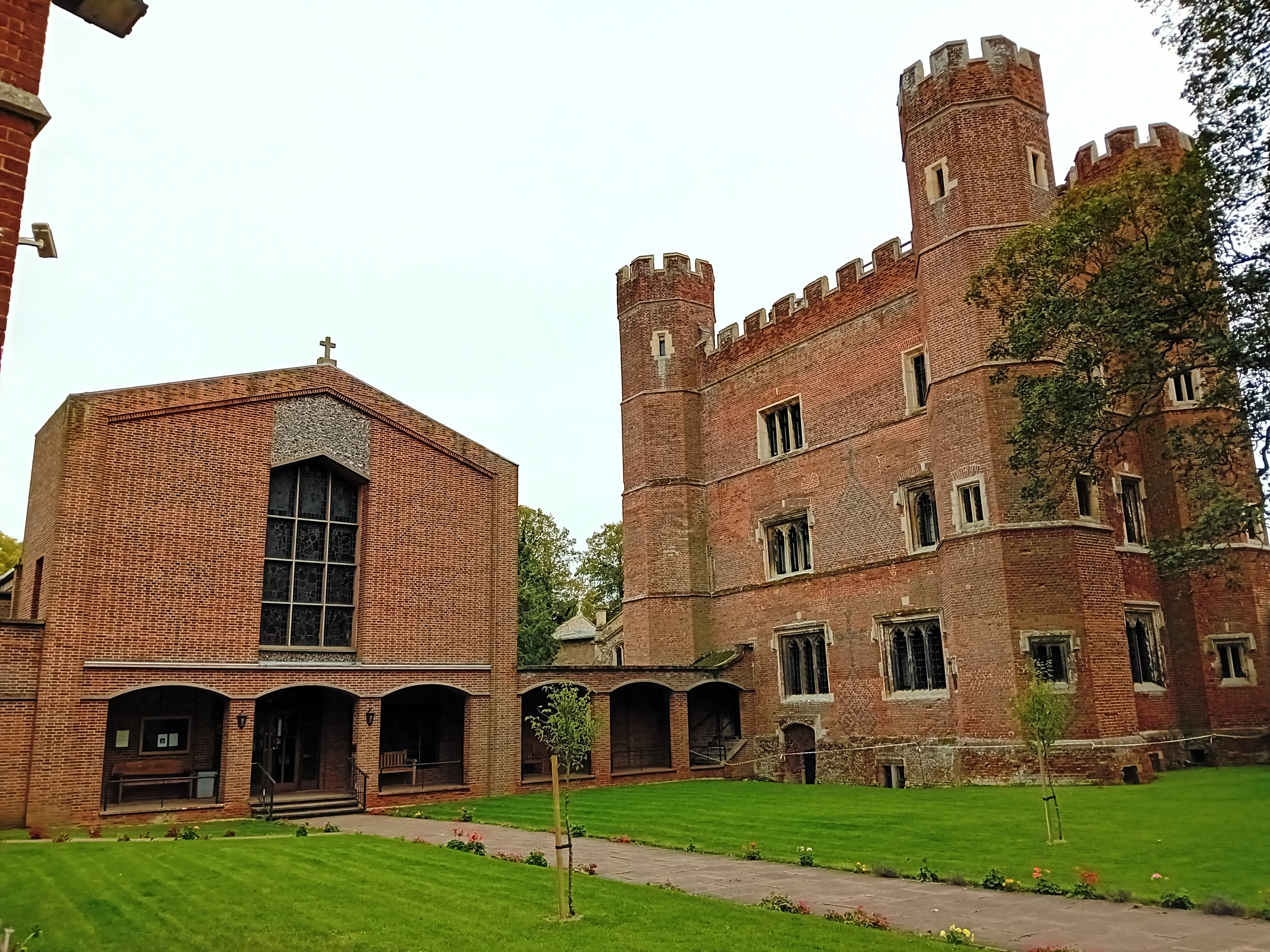
- The Great Tower and St Hugh's Church

Site information
- Type: Fortified house
- Open to the public: Grounds open regularly
- Condition: Used as a retreat and conference centre

Location
- Shown within Cambridgeshire
- Coordinates: 52°17′39″N 000°15′09″W

Site history
- Built: 1175
- In use: 1175-Present

Buckden Towers, formerly known as Buckden Palace, is a medieval fortified house and bishop's palace in Buckden, Cambridgeshire, England. It is now a conference and retreat centre operated by the Claretian missionaries.

== History ==
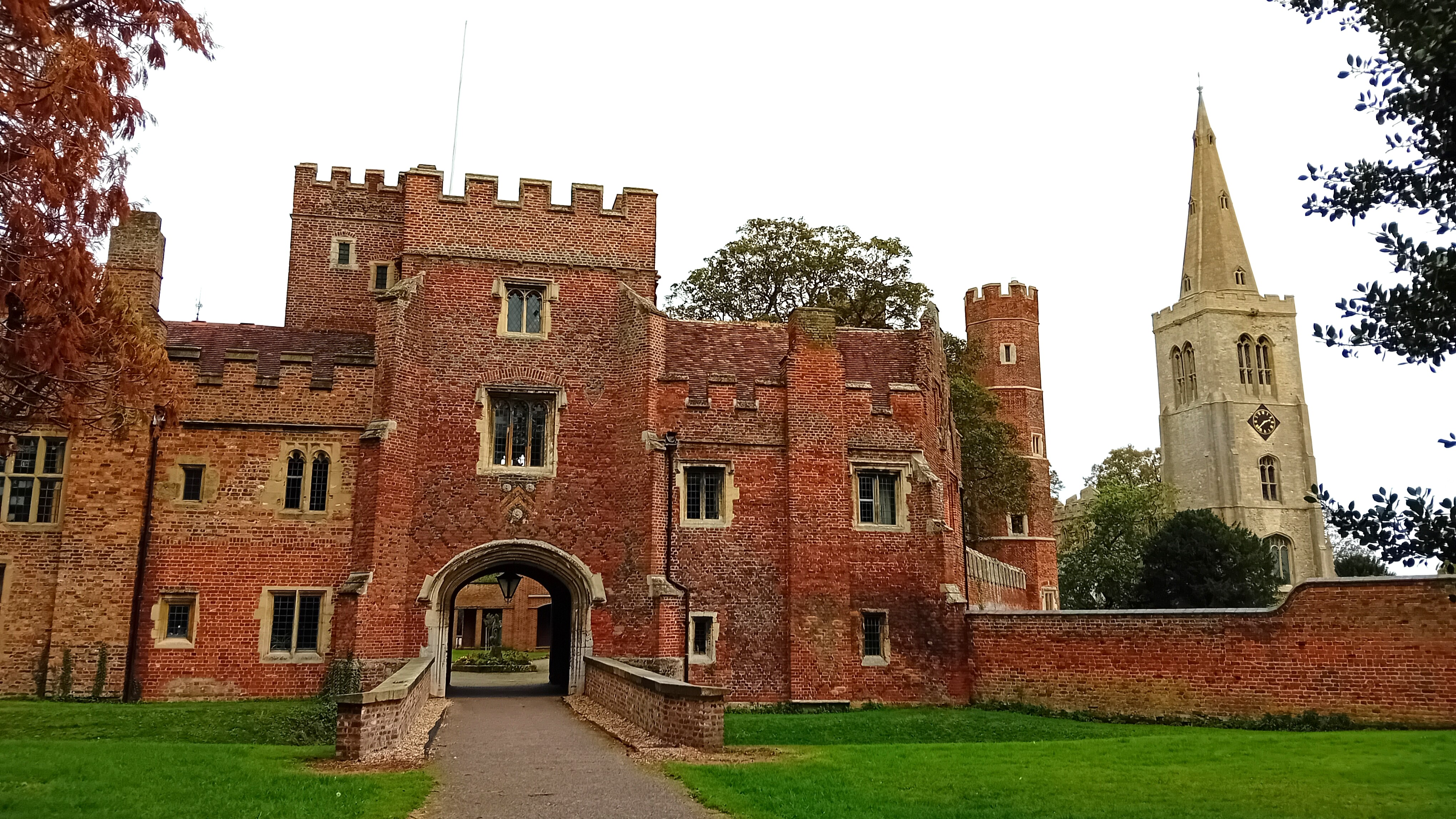
The Inner Gatehouse and the adjoining parish church of St Mary's.

The 15th-century buildings are the remains of the palace of the bishop of Lincoln. Although it is often stated as being built in the 15th century, the first (wooden) Palace was built in the late 12th century, when records show it as being used by the bishops of Lincoln. The wooden structure was replaced by more substantial buildings and a tall brick tower was added in 1475, protected by walls and a moat, and surrounded by an outer bailey. Parts of the complex were demolished in 1632 on the orders of the Ecclesiastical Commissioners. The Victorian house now present on the site was built in 1872. The remains of the bishops' moated palace consist of the great tower, the inner gatehouse, part of the battlemented wall, which used to surround the inner court within the moat, and the outer gate and wall.

The antiquary Edward John Rudge published a history, Illustrated and Historical Account of Buckden Palace, in 1839.

=== Present day ===
The site is a scheduled monument and the great tower, inner gatehouse and curtain walls are Grade I listed buildings.

The Claretian Missionaries were given the site by the Catholic Bishop of Northampton in 1956. Initially it was used as a junior seminary carrying out the preliminary training of 11- to 18-year-olds aspiring to become Claretian Missionary priests or brothers. The junior seminary closed in July 1965. Since then the Towers complex has been developed by the Claretians as a retreat and conference centre. Also on the site is the Catholic Church of St Hugh of Lincoln, which stands on the site of the great chamber of the medieval palace and was built as the chapel for the junior seminary. The grounds, but not the buildings, of the Towers are open to visitors at all reasonable times. Dogs are permitted, but only whilst on a lead.

== Notable visitors ==
- Henry III in 1248
- Edward I in 1291
- Richard III in 1483
- Lady Margaret Beaufort (mother of Henry VII) in 1501
- Queen Catherine of Aragon – resided here from July 1533 to May 1534 until she was transferred a few miles away to Kimbolton Castle, where she died in 1536. She was buried at Peterborough Cathedral.
- Henry VIII and Queen Catherine Howard in 1541. They stayed at Buckden Palace in 1541, during a summer tour that the King and Queen took of England before her coronation. It was during this tour that Catherine would be accused of committing adultery with Thomas Culpeper which led to her beheading for treason in 1542.
- On 16 July 1551, Henry, Duke of Suffolk, and his brother Lord Charles died here from the sweating sickness; they had come to Buckden to avoid the sickness at Cambridge.
- James VI and I in 1619
- In the 1630s Bishop Williams held state at Buckden, entertaining his neighbours with lavish displays of hospitality.
- The Prince Regent accompanied by Lord Lowther were driven from Burley on the Hill past Norman Cross Prison to visit the Bishop of Lincoln at his seat in Buckden on 10 January 1814. The royal traveller was received there by the military consisting of detachments of the 9th Light Dragoons, the West York and Herefordshire Militia, and a few artillerymen.
- William Barlow, Bishop of Lincoln – buried there

== See also ==
- Castles in Great Britain and Ireland
- List of castles in England

== Bibliography ==
- Pettifer, Adrian. (2002) English Castles: a Guide by Counties. Woodbridge, UK: Boydell Press. ISBN 978-0-85115-782-5.
