= Buckden, Cambridgeshire =

Village in Cambridgeshire, England

Coordinates: 52.293446°N 0.252419°W

Buckden
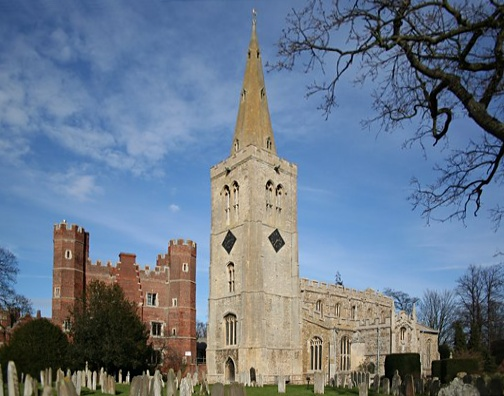
- Buckden Towers and St Mary's Church

- Location within Cambridgeshire
- Population: 2,805 (2011 census)
- OS grid reference: TL193661
  - London: 53 miles (85 km)
- District: Huntingdonshire
- Shire county: Cambridgeshire
- Region: East
- Country: England
- Sovereign state: United Kingdom
- Post town: St Neots
- Postcode district: PE19
- Dialling code: 01480
- Police: Cambridgeshire
- Fire: Cambridgeshire
- Ambulance: East of England
- UK Parliament: Huntingdon

Buckden is a village and civil parish within the Huntingdonshire district in Cambridgeshire, England. It is 4 miles (6.4 km) north of St Neots and 4 miles (6.4 km) south-west of Huntingdon. It includes the hamlets of Stirtloe and Hardwick. It lies within the historic county of Huntingdonshire, close to the north-south A1 road and the River Great Ouse.

In the centre of the village is Buckden Towers, once Buckden Palace, a residence of the bishops of Lincoln from the 12th to early 19th centuries. Several kings of England stayed there and Catherine of Aragon was held there in 1533 before being moved to Kimbolton Castle in 1534.

Buckden prospered in the 18th and early 19th centuries from being just over 50 miles (80 km) north of London on the Great North Road, which was a busy coaching road at the time. The development of the railways in the mid-19th century led to a decline in the population, but it more than doubled in the second half of the 20th century.

== History ==
=== Toponymy ===
Recorded in the Domesday Book of 1086 as Bugedene, Buckden has also been referred to as Buggeden (12–13th centuries), Bokeden (13th–14th centuries), Bukeden (13th–14th centuries), and Bugden (15th–18th centuries), with the present spelling taking over in the 18th century. The name originates from Old English; "Bucge" is a personal name and "dene" an Old English word for valley. The name is still pronounced Bugden locally.

=== Roman ===
Evidence of Roman settlement was found in 1963–1964 at a quarry site to the east of the village. In 1981, signs of a Roman villa appeared close to the Towers. Excavations in 2006 to the north-east of the village revealed evidence of a Romano-British field system of the 1st–4th centuries CE.

=== Middle Ages ===
In 1961, excavations uncovered crucibles and crucible fragments that appear to have been used to manufacture white and yellow glass and to date from Anglo-Saxon times. The site of the find was 0.5 miles (0.8 km) to the north-east of Buckden village, in an area of the Great Ouse valley about to be mined for sand and gravel.

"Bugedene" was listed in the Domesday Book in the Hundred of Toseland, Huntingdonshire. In 1086 there was a single manor at Buckden, whose annual rent of £20 paid to the lord of the manor in 1066 had fallen to £16.10s.

Domesday Book mentions 58 households at Buckden, suggesting a population of 200–300. It states there were 19 ploughlands there in 1086, with capacity for a further one. Apart from that, it had 84 acres (34 hectares) of meadows, 3,784 acres (1,531 hectares) of woodland and a water mill. The total manor tax assessment was 20 guilders.

By 1086 the village had a church and priest. The land was then owned by the Bishop of Lincoln, who may already have had a house there. He certainly had one when the Bishop held court by the mid–12th century. In 1227 Henry III granted the Bishop the right to a deer park at Buckden; by the time of a survey in 1647 this covered 425 acres and contained some 200 deer. By the late 17th century the deer were gone and the land enclosed as fields. The deer park lay to the west of the parish.

Buckden later had two manors. The larger was Buckden and the Members, whose lords were the bishops of Lincoln except in brief periods of the 14th, 16th and 17th centuries. The smaller, Buckden Brittains, was the home of the Briton (or Le Briton) family in the 13th century, but later changed hands many times. By the early 19th century, about 1,200 acres (490 hectares) were owned by the manor of Buckden and the Members and about 225 acres (91 hectares) by the manor of Buckden Brittains.

English kings who stayed at Buckden Palace were Henry III in 1248, Edward I in 1291 and Richard III in 1483. Henry VIII sent Catherine of Aragon to Buckden Palace after the annulment of their marriage (an issue known as the King's Great Matter), from July 1533 to May 1534. He and his fifth wife, Catherine Howard, stayed there in 1541. On Friday 18 June 1641, "hundreds of women and boys, armed with Daggers and Javelins, in a very tumultuous and riotous Manner" entered some land at Buckden owned by the Bishop of Lincoln and "turned in a great herd of cattle".

=== Georgian period ===
Buckden's site on the Great North Road made it a popular coaching stop in the 18th century. It had four coaching inns. The Lion dates from the 15th century and was enlarged in the 18th. The George Inn, with its courtyard and forge, was remodelled in the 18th century. The Vine dated from the first half of the 17th century and was rebuilt in the 18th to include stables and its own brewery. The Spread Eagle, originating in the 17th century, was altered in the 18th; it had stabling and paddocks. A schedule of 1839 shows six express coaches heading north every day, to Boston, Leeds, Lincoln and York, and as many heading south to London. The presence of elegant Georgian houses in Church Street and the High Street (the former Great North Road) reflects the prosperity brought by its strategic position on the coaching route.

=== Victorian and modern times ===
In 1854, just 15 years later, Buckden was called "a quiet insignificant place compared to what it was in coaching times", with the advent of the railways. The population, having steadily risen from 869 in 1801 to a peak of 1,291 in 1841, fell to 995 by 1911.

The open fields in Buckden were enclosed by Act of Parliament in 1813. In 1842 a girls' school was opened (a boys' school having existed for over a century) and a new school building built in 1871. A post mill erected in 1830 worked until 1888, when an auxiliary steam engine was installed. The mill was demolished in 1893. Domesday mentions a water mill on the Great Ouse; this was rebuilt about 1850 and converted to steam power in the 1890s. It ran until 1965, and from then until the 1980s was used for crop storage. By 2015, it had been turned into housing.

In the second half of the 20th century, new housing estates in Buckden led to a marked increase in the population.

== Governance ==
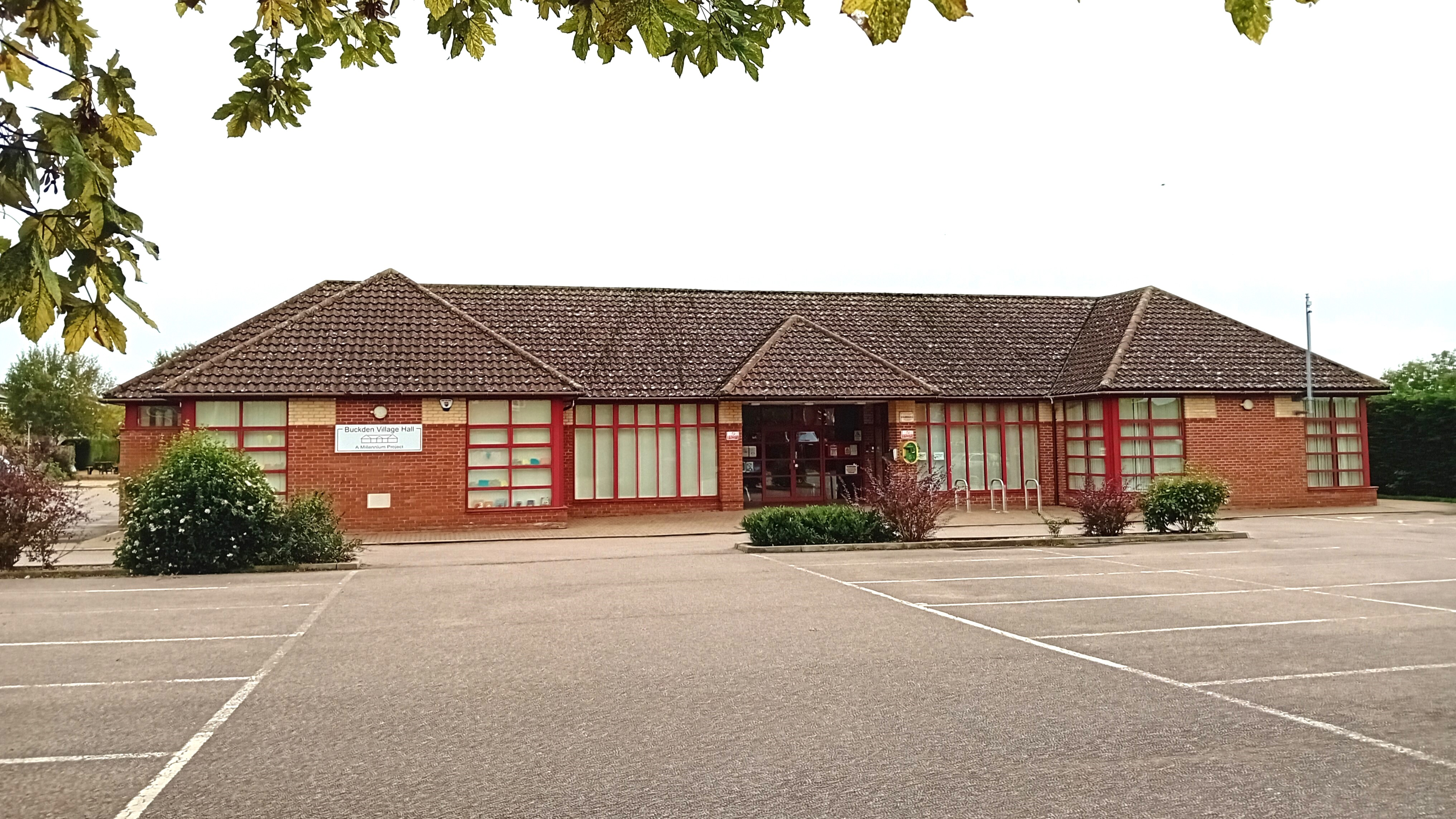
Village Hall, Burberry Road

Buckden as a civil parish had an elected parish council of 15 members in 2020. The second tier of governance is Huntingdonshire District Council, a non-metropolitan district of Cambridgeshire. The parish council is based at the village hall on Burberry Road, which was built in 1999.

Buckden is represented on Huntingdonshire District Council by one councillor for the Buckden district ward, which covers the civil parishes of Buckden, Diddington and Southoe and Midloe, and on Cambridgeshire County Council by one councillor for the Buckden, Gransden and The Offords electoral division. It belongs to the parliamentary constituency of Huntingdon County, held since 2015 by Jonathan Djanogly (Conservative).

Buckden was in the historic and administrative county of Huntingdonshire until 1965. From then it was part of a new administrative county of Huntingdon and Peterborough. In 1974, after the Local Government Act 1972, it became a part of Cambridgeshire.

== Geography ==
=== Buckden ===
The village of Buckden lies about 1.7 miles (2.7 km) west of the River Great Ouse. Between the Great Ouse and Buckden there are a number of disused, flooded gravel quarries. The village lies on sloping ground on the western edge of the river valley. Just to the west is the A1 road, following the route of the Great North Road roughly north and south. Access from the A1 is via a roundabout at the southern edge of Buckden. The western half of the parish slopes gently with low hills.

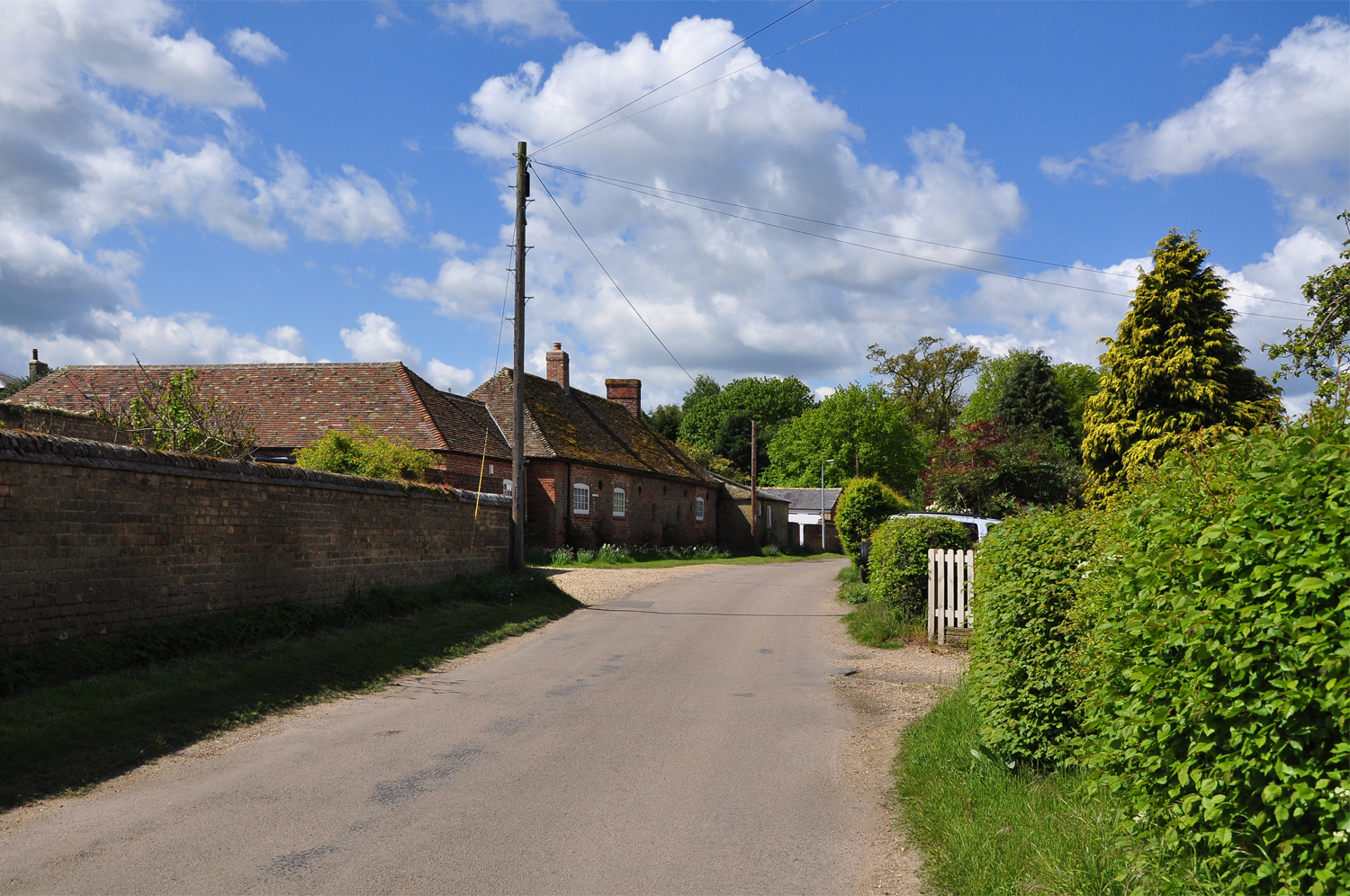
Stirtloe Lane, Stirtloe

=== Hamlets ===
The hamlet of Hardwick is joined to the north-west of Buckden village, but on the western side of the A1. There is a pedestrian subway under the A1 to connect it.

The hamlet of Stirtloe lies to the south of Buckden, separated from the village by 220 yards (200 m) of fields.

=== Geology ===
The village and parish lie on a bedrock of Oxford Clay Formation mudstone of blue-grey or olive-coloured clay formed some 156–165 million years ago in the Jurassic Period. The central area has river terrace deposits of sand and gravel from the Quaternary period, formed up to 3 million years ago by rivers. On the eastern side there are superficial deposits of alluvium (clay, silt, sand and gravel) from up to 2 million years ago in the Quaternary period. The land to the west of the parish is marked by Oadby Member Diamicton, again of the Quaternary period, with rocks formed under Ice Age conditions by glaciers scouring the land in the last 2 million years.

On the western side of the parish, the soil is classed as lime-rich loam and clay with impeded drainage. The central part, where the village lies, has freely draining, slightly acid loamy soil. On the eastern side, the soil is similar, but base-rich and loamy. The farmland in the parish is mainly arable, but with grassland notable in the Great Ouse valley. It lies between 39 feet (12 m) and 180 feet (55 m) above ordnance datum and covers an area of 3,114 acres (1,260 hectares).

=== Location ===
The southern boundary of the parish follows the line of Diddington Brook and the eastern boundary follows the River Great Ouse.

=== Climate ===
The UK climate, defined like most of north-west Europe as temperate and oceanic, or Cfb under the Köppen climate classification system, makes Eastern areas such as East Anglia drier, cooler and less windy, with greater daily and seasonal temperature variations. Cambridgeshire has cool onshore coastal breezes further to the east, keeping it warm in summer and cold and frosty in winter.

The nearest Met Office station to Buckden is at Monks Wood near Alconbury, 9 miles (14 km) north of Buckden. Average annual rainfall for the UK in 1981–2010 was 1,154 millimetres (45.4 in), but Cambridgeshire is one of the driest counties with about half that amount. Regional weather forecasting and historical summaries are available from the UK Met Office. Additional local weather stations report periodic figures to the internet such as Weather Underground, Inc.

Climate data for Monks Wood, elevation 41m, (1981–2010 averages)
Month	Jan	Feb	Mar	Apr	May	Jun	Jul	Aug	Sep	Oct	Nov	Dec	Year
Mean daily maximum °C (°F)	7.2 (45.0)	7.7 (45.9)	10.7 (51.3)	13.5 (56.3)	16.8 (62.2)	19.7 (67.5)	22.4 (72.3)	22.3 (72.1)	19.2 (66.6)	15.0 (59.0)	10.3 (50.5)	7.4 (45.3)	14.4 (57.9)
Mean daily minimum °C (°F)	1.1 (34.0)	0.8 (33.4)	2.6 (36.7)	3.8 (38.8)	6.6 (43.9)	9.7 (49.5)	11.8 (53.2)	11.7 (53.1)	9.9 (49.8)	7.0 (44.6)	3.9 (39.0)	1.9 (35.4)	5.9 (42.6)
Average rainfall mm (inches)	47.0 (1.85)	35.0 (1.38)	40.1 (1.58)	47.0 (1.85)	47.9 (1.89)	54.1 (2.13)	48.3 (1.90)	51.7 (2.04)	53.3 (2.10)	60.2 (2.37)	54.2 (2.13)	47.1 (1.85)	585.8 (23.06)
Mean monthly sunshine hours	58.0	77.4	109.9	152.3	186.2	180.6	193.3	188.1	142.5	114.6	67.0	52.4	1,522.2
Source: Met Office Monks Wood, Cambridgeshire

== Demography ==
The resident population of the built-up area of Buckden in the 2021 census was 2,753; this is estimated to be 3,010 in 2024. The population density was 2,654 per km^{2}). The age distribution shows that 52 are in the age range 18 to 64 abd 27.5% over the age of 65. The mean average number of persons per household was 2.4.

In 2011, 70.2 per cent of Buckden residents were between the ages of 16 and 74 and found potentially economically active. Of these, 67.9 per cent held part-time, full-time or self-employed work, 30.0 per cent were economically inactive (retired, carers, long-term sick and disabled) and 2.0 per cent unemployed. The five main work sectors appear below:

Industry Sector	Percentage
Wholesale and Retail (including repair of motor vehicles)	13.1%
Human Health and Social Work	10.2%
Public Administration, Defence and Social Security	10.1%
Education	8.9%
Construction	8.8%

In 2009, median household income across Cambridgeshire of £32,500 was exceeded by Buckden's £36,900.

The Office for National Statistics has placed the village of Buckden in the Lower Layer Super Output Area (LSOA) called "Huntingdonshire 017C". This was ranked 23,371 out of 32,844 LSOAs in England against the index of multiple deprivation in 2015. It puts Buckden among the 30 per cent least deprived neighbourhoods in England. Much of the civil parish (but excluding the village itself) is in the Lower Layer Super Output Area (LSOA) called "Huntingdonshire 017B", which in 2015, was ranked 29,569 out of 32,844 LSOAs in England against the index of multiple deprivation. This puts the rural part of the parish among the 10 per cent least deprived neighbourhoods in England.

The 2011 census showed 93 per cent of residents born in the UK, 3 per cent in other EU countries and 4 per cent elsewhere in the world. Racially, 98.3 per cent of Buckden people called themselves ethnic white, 0.8 per cent cited mixed or multiple ethnic groups, and 0.6 per cent Asian or British Asian, with the rest in other groups. In the same census, 69.3 per cent called themselves as Christian, 23.2 per cent said they had no religious beliefs, 6.3 per cent did not specify a religion, and 1.1 per cent adhered to another religion (Buddhist, Hindu, Jewish, Muslim, Sikh or other).

=== Historical population ===
The population of the parish of Buckden as recorded in the UK censuses between 1801 and 1901 ranged between 869 and 1,209. The population of Buckden almost doubled in the 1960s.

Parish	1911	1921	1931	1951	1961	1971	1991	2001	2011
Buckden	995	998	1,037	1,057	1,158	2,010	2,535	2,515	2,805

Census: Buckden 1801–1971 Census Population: Buckden 1951, 1971, 1991 Census Population: Buckden 2001–2011

The population of Buckden district ward of, which includes the parishes of Diddington and of Southloe and Midloe, was 3,293 in the 2011 UK census.

== Culture and community ==
In 1871, Buckden had 13 inns and public houses, but by 2015 only three remained: The George, The Vine and The Lion Hotel. The Spread Eagle, which closed in 2003, is now a private house. All four former coaching inns are Grade II listed buildings. Buckden has some shops, including supermarkets, a post office, a pharmacy and clothiers, and over 100 private businesses based there.

Buckden Marina, built in 1963, is next to the Great Ouse; originally with some 150 berths but now 240, over an area of 22 acres (8.9 hectares). In 2001, Lafarge Aggregates and Buckden Marina Co. was joint winner of the Cooper–Heyman Cup, awarded by the Quarry Products Association, for restoring a 70 acres (28 hectares) quarry as a water-recreation complex and wildlife area.

The first issue the monthly community magazine Buckden Roundabout appeared in September 1979. A charitable trust set up in 1958 manages the village hall and the adjacent recreation ground of some 12 acres (4.9 hectares), with four tennis courts, a children's play area, cricket and football pitches and a bowls green. There are clubs for cricket, association football club, and bowls club (founded in 1929). The village hall was expanded in the early 21st century as Buckden Millennium Village Hall. It includes a public library.

== Transport ==
Buckden is close to the A1 main road, an important north-south artery. Buckden is connected to it at a roundabout at the south end of the High Street. Main routes west and east are available at Brampton Hut Interchange, a few miles north of Buckden. Local roads run west to Perry and Kimbolton from the A1 roundabout, and east through Church Street and Mill Road to Offord Cluny. The B1514 road leads north-east to Huntingdon through Brampton, branching from the A1 a short distance north of Buckden.

The nearest railway station is at Huntingdon, 3.5 miles (5.6 km) away, where regular services run south to London and north to Peterborough.

The Whippet Bus Company operates a service from St Neots to Huntingdon via Buckden and Hinchingbrooke Hospital. Dews Coaches operates a between Buckden and St Neots via Offord Cluny.

== Landmarks ==
Buckden Towers (or Buckden Palace) was a former residence of the Bishop of Lincoln, whose medieval diocese reached almost to London. A house was built by the mid-12th century, where the Bishop held court, but it burnt down in 1291 and was rebuilt. Further rebuilding and extension took place in the 15th century, including a new red-brick tower of a similar design to Tattershall Castle, Lincolnshire, although that of Buckden has only four storeys. Buckden Palace accommodated Catherine of Aragon for a short time before she was moved to Kimbolton Castle. The palace was neglected in the earlier 17th century. A survey in 1647 included a Great Chamber, chapel, brick tower and gatehouse, all enclosed by a moat. The grounds had at least four fishponds and the park about 200 deer.

Huntingdonshire, with Buckden Palace, was transferred from the Diocese of Lincoln to that of Ely in 1837. Several parts were demolished in the 19th century and many that remained were used by the local vicar and a school. In 1848 the palace was described as a "venerable structure". It passed into private ownership in 1870 and was renamed Buckden Towers. The Victorian house currently on the site dates from 1872.

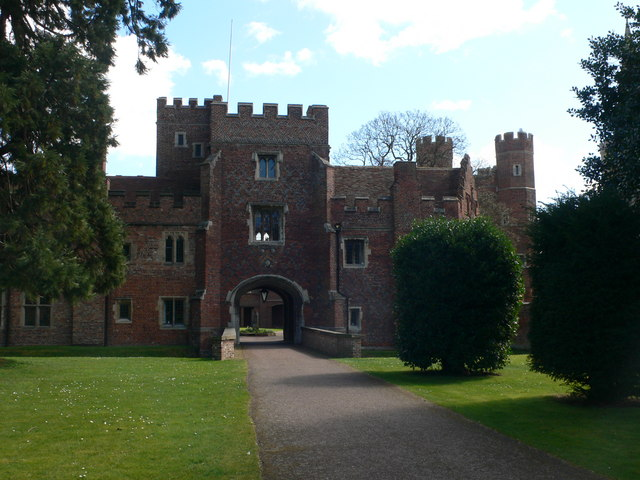
The Gatehouse at Buckden Towers

Between 1914 and 1919 Buckden Towers was used as a Red Cross hospital and in the Second World War as a home for evacuees from the London blitz. After the war Buckden Towers was passed to the Roman Catholic church and in 1956 to Claretian missionaries, who carried out restoration and built a Catholic church for the village.

The site of the original palace is designated an ancient monument and Victorian Buckden Towers as a Grade II listed building; the Inner Gatehouse, Curtain Wall and Towers of the earlier Buckden Palace are all Grade I listed buildings. Apart from these and the former coaching inns, the parish has more than 60 other listed buildings, mainly round Buckden Towers. Much of the centre round Buckden Towers, along the High Street and Church Street, has been designated a Conservation Area by Huntingdonshire District Council.

To the east, in the Great Ouse valley, are several small lakes where gravel pits used to be. The enclosure map of 1813 shows the position of one and another appears on an Ordnance Survey map of 1926. Not until the 1960s did large-scale gravel and sand extraction take place, needed for two major local construction projects: the dual carriageway of the A1 and the dam at Graham Water. In 1986 the pits covered 400 acres (160 hectares). Buckden Marina was built in a small disused gravel pit close to the Great Ouse.

== Education ==
In 1661 a parish charity school was founded in Buckden for boys. It still existed when in 1842 a National School for girls was founded in part of the Bishop's Palace. A new school building opened in 1871 to house the girls' school. The two schools merged in 1941. A new infant school opened in 1966; much was rebuilt after a fire in 1978. A primary school was built in 1972. Buckden Church of England Primary School became an Academy in 2010 and operates independently of the local authority; 248 students were on the roll in 2014–2015. The Ofsted report on an inspection in 2015 rated the overall effectiveness of the school as outstanding. Buckden is in the secondary education catchment area of Hinchingbrooke School.

== Places of worship ==
The Anglican church dedicated to St Mary the Virgin is a grade I listed building consisting of a chancel with organ chamber and vestry, a nave, a west tower, north and south aisles and a porch. It was listed in the Domesday Book of 1086, but nothing of that date remains. The church contains some 13th-century features, but it was much enlarged and rebuilt in the 15th. The buttresses to the north were added in the 17th century. Restoration ensued in 1840, 1860 and 1884. The west tower has an embattled parapet topped by an octagonal spire that Lewis described as "elegant". There were five bells in the tower until 1997, when the bell frame and old bells were renewed and an extra bell installed. An extension, the Living Stones Room opened in 2011, includes a meeting room, kitchen and toilets. In 2006 Buckden and the Offords became a single benefice within the deanery of St Neots in the diocese of Ely.

A small Methodist chapel was built about 1838; a larger chapel built in 1876 remains in use. The Catholic church built by the Claretians was dedicated to St Hugh of Lincoln in 1959. It is in the Diocese of East Anglia. A nonconformist chapel existed between about 1840 and 1862. After renovation, it re-opened in 1905 as a joint Baptist and Congregational chapel. it remained in use for worship until 1984, when it was converted first for commercial use and in 2006 as a private residence.

== Notable people ==
- Hugh of Lincoln (c. 1135–1200), Bishop of Lincoln, builder of first wooden palace at Buckden
- Robert Grosseteste (c. 1175–1253), scholastic philosopher, statesman and Bishop of Lincoln, died at Buckden.
- Catherine of Aragon (1485–1536), divorced queen of Henry VIII, was confined at Buckden Towers in July 1533 – May 1534.
- Thomas Barlow (1608/9–1691), religious writer and Bishop of Lincoln, died at Buckden.
- Richard Reynolds (1674–1743), bishop of Lincoln active against the Walpole ministry in the House of Lords, was buried in Buckden church.
- Edward Mann Langley (1851–1933), mathematician, was born in Buckden.
- John Leslie Green (1888–1916), born in Buckden, was awarded the Victoria Cross, for valour ending with his own death at the Battle of the Somme on 1 July 1916.
- Lionel Powys-Maurice (1899–1991), a county cricketer with Northants, died in Buckden.
- Chris Morris (born 1962 in Buckden), is a comedian and director known for black humour.

== Public services ==
Crime reported in Buckden December 2014 to November 2015
1. Anti-social behaviour (26.5%)
2. Bicycle theft (1.70%)
3. Burglary (12.8%)
4. Criminal damage and arson (10.3%)
5. Drugs (4.30%)
6. Other theft (18.8%)
7. Public order (1.70%)
8. Shoplifting (1.70%)
9. Vehicle crime (10.3%)
10. Violence and sexual offences (10.3%)
11. Other (1.60%)

Anglian Water supplies the village water and sewage services from its Huntingdon South Public Water Supply zone (FW41). The water quality was rated excellent in 2015. In the same report, the hardness was reported as 301 mg/L of calcium carbonate, placing it in the very hard range. The nearest reservoir, Grafham Water, is 1.5 miles (2.4 km) west of the village.

The distribution network operator for electricity is UK Power Networks.

Huntingdonshire District Council is part of the Recycling in Cambridgeshire and Peterborough (RECAP) Partnership, which was granted Beacon status for waste and recycling in 2006–2007. In 2014–2015 the council was just short of a target of recycling or composting 55 per cent of all local household waste.

National Health Services (NHS) for the village are administered by NHS East of England. The nearest hospital is Hinchingbrooke, which is 4 miles (6.4 km) from Buckden and has a range of specialities, including Accident and Emergency. Further afield is Addenbrooke's Hospital 16 miles (26 km) south-east and Royal Papworth Hospital, co-located with Addenbrooke's Hospital. There is a General practice surgery in the village.

The Cambridgeshire and Peterborough Fire Authority is responsible for providing fire and rescue services to a region that includes Buckden. Its headquarters are in Brampton; the nearest 24-hour fire station is in Huntingdon.

Cambridgeshire Constabulary provides law enforcement in the county. The nearest police station is in Huntingdon. In the 12 months from December 2014 to November 2015, 117 street crimes were reported within a 1-mile (1.6 km) radius of Church Street, Buckden – an average of just under 10 per month. The most frequent crime was anti-social behaviour. A Neighbourhood Watch Scheme has operated since before 1998.
