= Maurice Bruyn =

English knight

Sir Maurice Bruyn (or Brewyn) of South Ockendon (or South Okington), Essex (14 September 1386 – 8 November 1466) was an English knight.

== Family ==
Sir Maurice Bruyn was born 14 September 1386 at South Ockendon, Essex, the son of Sir Ingram Bruyn of South Ockendon, Essex (Titchfield, Hampshire, 6 December 1353, baptized Chark, Titchfield, Hampshire, 6 December 1353 – 12 August 1400, buried South Ockendon, Essex) and Elizabeth de la Pole (14 July 1362 – 14 December 1403). He was named after his great-grandfather Maurice le Brun, 1st Baron Brun. The Bruyn family also held the manor of Beckenham, Kent.

== Life ==
He was appointed High Sheriff of Essex in 1423, and in 1435. Before 1527 the position included Hertfordshire under the one title.

== Marriages and children ==
He married three times, firstly to an unknown woman, secondly after 1415 to Edith, family name unknown (died between 26 April 1418 and 27 April 1418) but described in William of Wykeham's will as a kinswoman and left £100, widow of William Croser of Stoke d'Abernon, Surrey (married before 1415, died 9 December 1415), without male issue, and thirdly to Elizabeth Retford (died 20 May 1471 with will dated 4 February 1470/1471 and probated 17 June 1471), daughter of Sir Henry Retford of Killingholme, Lincolnshire, of Irby upon Humber, Lincolnshire, and of Carlton Paynell, Lincolnshire. By his third wife he had a son:

- Sir Henry Bruyn of South Ockendon, Essex (died 30 November 1461), married to Elizabeth Darcy, daughter of Sir Robert Darcy of Maldon, Essex, and had two daughters:
  - Elizabeth Bruyn (died 7 March 1493/1494), co-heiress, married firstly before 17 February 1461/1462 to Thomas Tyrell (died after 3 July 1471), son of Sir Thomas Tyrell of Heron, Essex, secondly before 4 November 1475 to Sir William Brandon (1456 – 22 August 1485) and thirdly after 22 August 1485 William Mallory or Mallery, Esq. (died before 7 March 1493/1494)
  - Alice Bruyn (died 15 February 1472/1473), co-heiress, married three times: firstly before 17 February 1461/1462 to John Berners, secondly to Robert Harleston of Shimpling, Suffolk, who fought in the Battle of Barnet on 21 April 1471 where he was killed in action, attainted in 1474 but reversed in 1486, and thirdly after 3 July 1471 Sir John Heveningham of Heveningham, Suffolk (died 20 March 1498/1499), remarried as her third husband to Margaret St. Leger (died 1 February 1495/1496)
