= Bugden =

Bugden is an Anglo-Saxon surname originating in Huntingdonshire or West Yorkshire around 1086 c.e.

== People named Bugden ==
- Bob Bugden (1936–2023), Australian rugby league footballer
- Geoff Bugden (born 1960), Australian rugby league footballer
- Mark Bugden (born 1961), Australian rugby league footballer
- Paddy Bugden (1920–1993), Australian rugby league footballer
- Patrick Bugden (1897–1917), Australian Victoria Cross recipient
