= Sweating sickness =

Contagious disease in Europe, 1485–1551

- Other names: English sweating sickness, English sweat, (Latin) sudor anglicus
- Specialty: Infectious diseases
- Symptoms: chills, pains, weakness
- Causes: Unknown

Sweating sickness, also known as the sweats, English sweating sickness, English sweat or sudor anglicus in Latin, was a mysterious and contagious disease that struck England and later continental Europe in a series of epidemics beginning in 1485. Other major outbreaks of the English sweating sickness occurred in 1508, 1517, and 1528, with the last outbreak in 1551, after which the disease apparently vanished. The onset of symptoms was sudden, and death or recovery often occurred within 8–10 hours. Sweating sickness epidemics were unique compared with other disease outbreaks of the time. Whereas other epidemics were typically urban and long-lasting, cases of sweating sickness spiked and receded very quickly, significantly affecting rural populations. Its cause remains unknown, although it has been suggested that an unknown species of hantavirus was responsible.

== Signs and symptoms ==
John Caius was a physician in Shrewsbury in 1551, when an outbreak occurred, and he described the symptoms and signs of the disease in A Boke or Counseill Against the Disease Commonly Called the Sweate, or Sweatyng Sicknesse (1552), which is the main historical source of knowledge of the disease. It began very suddenly with a sense of apprehension, followed by cold shivers (sometimes very violent), dizziness, headache, and severe pains in the neck, shoulders, and limbs, with great exhaustion. The cold stage lasted from half an hour to three hours, after which the hot and sweating stage began. The characteristic sweat broke out suddenly without any obvious cause. A sense of heat, headache, delirium, rapid pulse, and intense thirst accompanied the sweat. Palpitations and pain in the heart were frequent symptoms. No skin eruptions were noted by observers. In the final stages there was either general exhaustion and collapse, or an irresistible urge to sleep, which Caius thought was fatal if the patient were permitted to give way to it. One attack of the disease did not result in immunity to subsequent occurrences, and some people suffered several bouts before dying. The disease typically lasted through one full day before recovery or death took place. The disease tended to occur in summer and early autumn.

Thomas Forestier, a physician during the first outbreak, provided a written account of his own experiences with the sweating sickness in 1485. Forestier put great emphasis on the sudden breathlessness commonly associated with the final hours of sufferers. Forestier claimed in an account written for other physicians that "loathsome vapours" had congregated around the heart and lungs. His observations point towards a pulmonary component of the disease.

== Cause ==
The cause is unknown. Commentators then and now have blamed the sewage, poor sanitation, and contaminated water supplies. The first confirmed outbreak was in August 1485 at the end of the Wars of the Roses, leading to speculation that it may have been brought from France by French mercenaries. However, an earlier outbreak may have affected the city of York in June 1485, before Henry Tudor's army landed, although records of that disease's symptoms are not adequate enough to be certain. Regardless, the Croyland Chronicle mentions that Thomas Stanley, 1st Earl of Derby cited the sweating sickness as reason not to join Richard III's army prior to the Battle of Bosworth. Others believed it came from trading with Scandinavia and Russia through the towns on the Yorkshire-Lincolnshire coast.

Relapsing fever, a disease spread by ticks and lice, has been proposed as a possible cause. It occurs most often during the summer months, as did the original sweating sickness. However, relapsing fever is marked by a prominent black scab at the site of the tick bite and a subsequent rash, neither of which are described as the symptoms of sweating sickness.

The suggestion of ergotism was ruled out due to England's growing much less rye (which ergots typically grow on) than the rest of Europe.

Researchers have noted that symptoms overlap with Hantavirus hemorrhagic fever with renal syndrome and have proposed an unknown hantavirus as the cause. Hantavirus species are zoonotic diseases carried by bats, rodents, and several insectivores. Sharing of similar trends (including seasonal occurrences, fluctuations multiple times a year, and occasional occurrences between major outbreaks) suggest the English sweating sickness may have been rodent-borne. The epidemiology of hantavirus correlates with the trends of the English sweating sickness, except that Hantavirus infections generally do not strike infants, children, or the elderly, and mostly affect middle-aged adults. A criticism of this hypothesis is that modern-day hantaviruses, unlike the sweating sickness, do not randomly disappear and can be seen affecting isolated people. Another is that sweating sickness was thought to have been transmitted from human to human, whereas hantaviruses are rarely spread that way. However, infection via human contact has been suggested in hantavirus outbreaks in Argentina and aboard a cruise ship.

Numerous attempts have been made to define the disease origin by molecular biology methods, but have so far failed due to a lack of available DNA or RNA.

=== Transmission ===
Transmission mostly remains a mystery, with only a few pieces of evidence in writing. Despite greatly affecting the rural and working classes of the time, the sweating sickness did not discriminate, as it was no less likely to affect young, seemingly fit men, including those of the elite or privileged classes. Based upon recorded accounts, the mortality rate among victims was highest in males aged 30–40 years. The fact that it infected all levels of society, from rich to poor, earned the sweating sickness various nicknames, such as "Stoop Gallant" or "Stoop Knave" — referencing how the 'proud' castes were forced to 'stoop' and face their own humanity.

The large number of people present in London to witness the coronation of Henry VII may have accelerated the spread of the disease, as well as many other airborne pathogens.

== Epidemiology ==
=== Fifteenth century ===
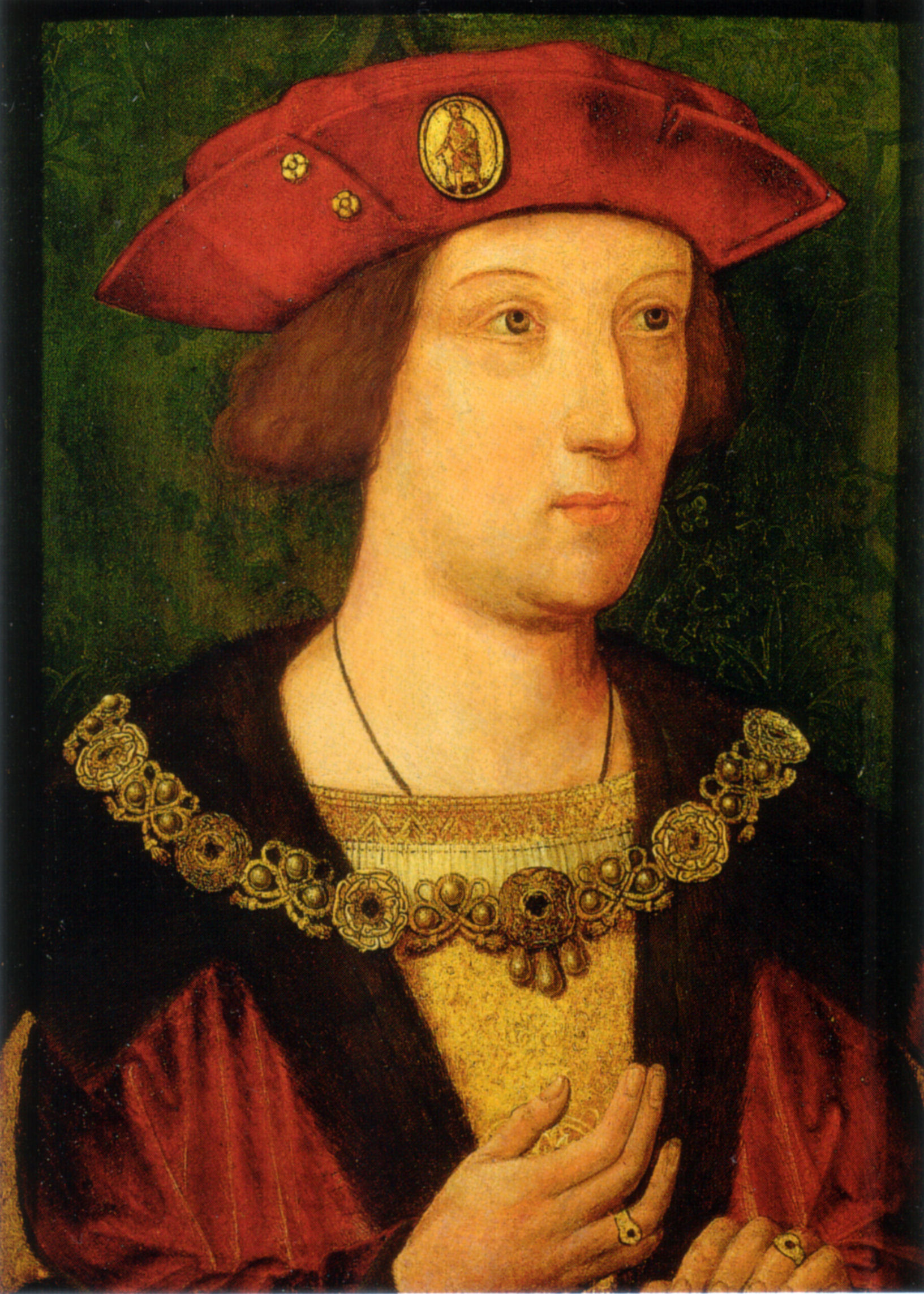
Arthur, Prince of Wales, who may have died of the sweating sickness in 1502, aged fifteen

Sweating sickness first came to the attention of physicians at the beginning of the reign of Henry VII, in 1485. It was frequently fatal; half the population perished in some areas. The Ricardian scholar John Ashdown-Hill conjectures that Richard III fell victim the night before the Battle of Bosworth Field and that this accounted for his sleepless night and excessive thirst in the early part of the battle. There is no definitive statement that the sickness was present in Henry Tudor's troops landing at Milford Haven. The battle's victor, Henry VII, arrived in London on 28 August, and the disease broke out there on 19 September 1485; it had killed several thousand people by its conclusion in late October that year. Among those killed were two lord mayors, six aldermen, and three sheriffs.

Mass superstition and paranoia followed the new plague. The Battle of Bosworth Field ended the Wars of the Roses between the houses of Lancaster and York. Richard III, the final York king, was killed there and Henry VII was crowned. As chaos, grief, and anger spread, people searched for a culprit for the plague. English people started to believe it was sent by God to punish supporters of Henry VII. The idea that the sickness was caused by God's wrath was not a new concept during this time, and would be an idea present for each outbreak.

Because of its extremely rapid and fatal course, and the sweating that gave it its name, the sickness was regarded as being quite distinct from the Black Death, the pestilential fever, or other epidemics previously known. It reached Ireland in 1492; the Annals of Ulster record the death of James Fleming, 7th Baron Slane from the pláigh allais ["perspiring plague"], newly come to Ireland. The Annals of Connacht also record this obituary, and the Annals of the Four Masters record "an unusual plague in Meath" of 24 hours' duration; people recovered if they survived it beyond that 24-hour period. The sickness did not affect infants or young children. English chronicler Richard Grafton mentioned the sweating sickness of 1485 in his work Grafton's Chronicle: or History of England. He noted the common treatment of the disease was to go immediately to bed at the first sign of symptoms; there, the affected person was to remain still for the entire 24-hour period of the illness, abstaining from any solid food and limiting water intake.

=== Sixteenth century ===
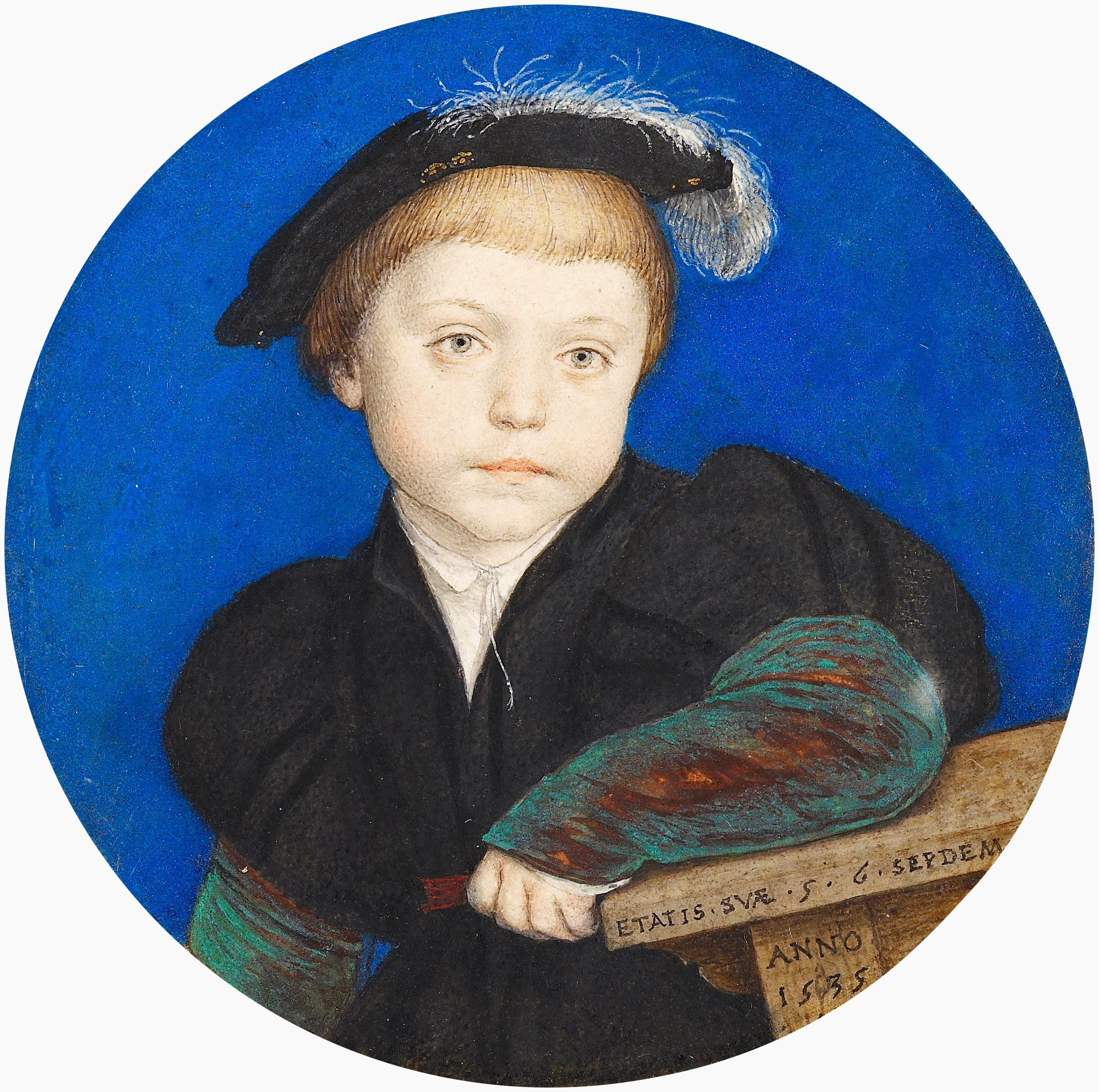
Henry Brandon, 2nd Duke of Suffolk, who in 1551 died of the sweating sickness aged fifteen, just an hour before his brother Charles also succumbed. Portrait by Hans Holbein the Younger

The ailment was not recorded from 1492 to 1502. It may have been the condition that afflicted Henry VII's son Arthur, Prince of Wales, and Arthur's wife, Catherine of Aragon, in March 1502; their illness was described as "a malign vapour which proceeded from the air". Researchers who opened Arthur's tomb in 2002 could not determine the exact cause of death. Catherine recovered, but Arthur died on 2 April 1502 in his home at Ludlow Castle, six months short of his sixteenth birthday.

A second, less widespread outbreak occurred in 1507, followed by a third and much more severe epidemic in 1517, a few cases of which may have also spread to Calais. In the 1517 epidemic, the disease showed a particular affinity for the English; the ambassador from Venice at the time commented on the peculiarly low number of cases in foreign visitors. A similar effect was noted in 1528 when Calais (then an English territory) experienced an outbreak that did not spread into France. The 1528 outbreak, the fourth, reached epidemic proportions. The earliest written reference to it was on 5 June 1528, in a letter to Cuthbert Tunstall, Bishop of London from Brian Tuke, who said that he had fled to Stepney to avoid infection from a servant at his house who was ill with "the sweat.", suggesting that it broke out in London at the end of May. The sweats spread over the whole of England, save the far north. It did not spread to Scotland, though it did reach Ireland where Lord Chancellor Hugh Inge, who died on 3 August 1528, was the most prominent victim. Mortality was very high in London; Henry VIII broke up the court and left London, frequently changing his residence. In 1529 Thomas Cromwell lost his wife and two daughters to the disease. It is believed that several of the closest people to Henry VIII contracted the sickness. His love letters to his mistress, Anne Boleyn, reveal that physicians believed Anne had contracted the illness. Henry sent his second-most trusted physician to her aid, his first being unavailable, and she survived. Cardinal Wolsey contracted the illness and survived.

The disease was brought to Hamburg by a ship from England in July 1529. It spread along the Baltic coast, north to Denmark, Sweden, and Norway as well as south to Strasbourg, Frankfurt, Cologne, Marburg, and Göttingen in September of that year. Cases were unknown in Italy or France, except in the English-controlled Pale of Calais. It emerged in Flanders and the Netherlands, possibly transmitted directly from England by travellers; it appeared simultaneously in the cities of Antwerp and Amsterdam on the morning of 27 September. In each place, it prevailed for a short time, generally not more than two weeks. By the end of 1529, it had entirely disappeared except in the eastern part of the Swiss Confederacy, where it lingered into the next year. The disease did not recur in mainland Europe.

=== Final outbreak ===
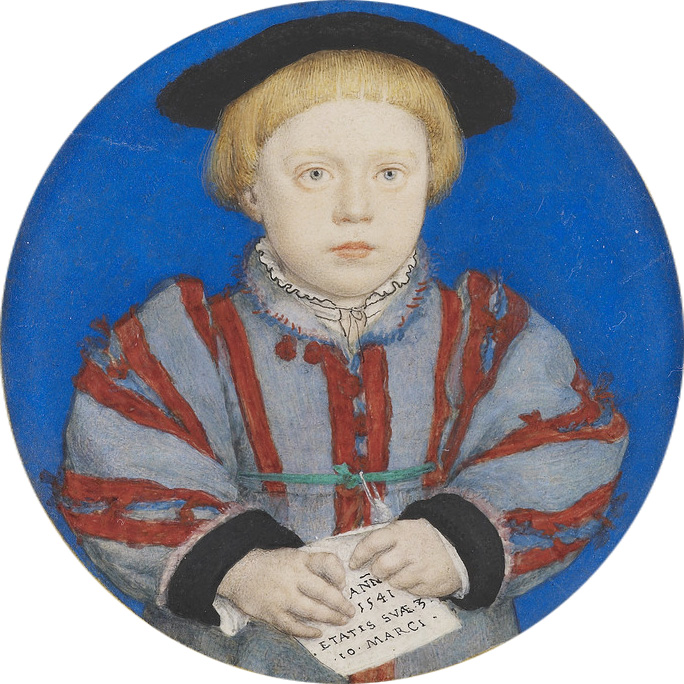
Charles Brandon, 3rd Duke of Suffolk, died of the sweating sickness at age thirteen, having held the dukedom for just an hour after his elder brother died of the disease

The last major outbreak of the disease occurred in England in 1551. Although burial patterns in smaller towns in Europe suggest that the disease may have been present elsewhere first, the outbreak is recorded to have begun in Shrewsbury in April. It killed around 1,000 there, spreading quickly throughout the rest of England, all but disappearing by October. It was more prevalent among younger men than other groups, possibly due to their greater social exposure. John Caius wrote his eyewitness account A Boke or Counseill Against the Disease Commonly Called the Sweate, or Sweatyng Sicknesse. Caius ascribed the cause to dirt and filth, although some modern investigators have considered it to be a form of influenza.

Henry Machyn also recorded it in his diary:

the vii day of July begane a nuw swet in London…the x day of July [1551] the Kynges grace removyd from Westmynster unto Hamtun courte, for ther [died] serten besyd the court, and caused the Kynges grase to be gone so sune, for ther ded in London mony marchants and grett ryche men and women, and yonge men and old, of the new swett…the xvi day of July ded of the swet the ii yonge dukes of Suffoke of the swet, both in one bed in Chambrydge-shyre…and ther ded from the vii day of July unto the xix ded of the swett in London of all dyssesus… [872] and no more in alle

— The Diary of Henry Machyn 1550–1563

The Annals of Halifax Parish of 1551 records 44 deaths in an outbreak there. An outbreak called 'sweating sickness' occurred in Tiverton, Devon in 1644, recorded in Martin Dunsford's History, killing 443 people, 105 of them buried in October. However, no medical particulars were recorded, and the date falls well after the generally accepted disappearance of the 'sweating sickness' in 1551.

== Picardy sweat ==
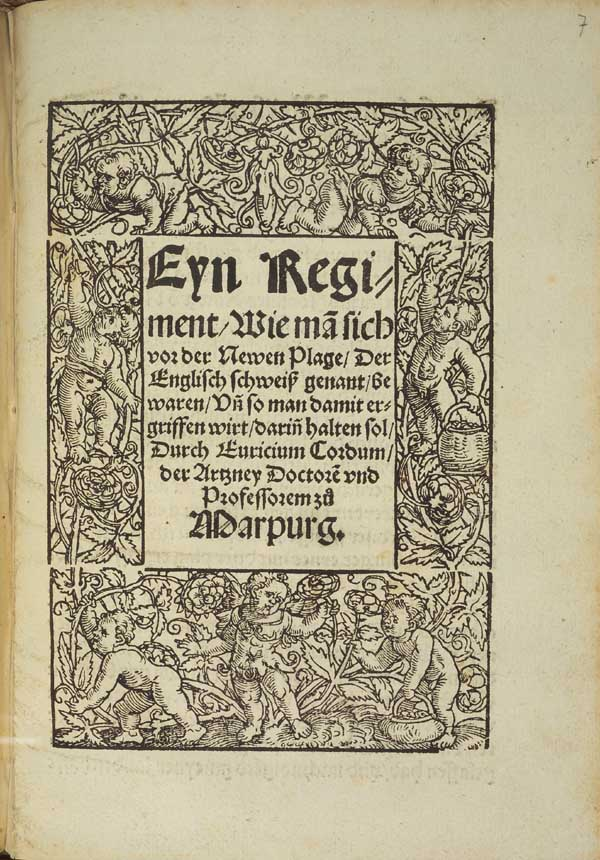
Title of a publication in Marburg, 1529, about the English Sweating sickness

Between 1718 and 1918 an illness with some similarities occurred in France, known as the Picardy sweat. It was significantly less lethal than the English Sweat, but with a strikingly high frequency of outbreaks; some 200 were recorded during the period. Llywelyn Roberts noted "a great similarity between the two diseases." There was intense sweating and fever, and Henry Tidy found "no substantial reason to doubt the identity of sudor anglicus and Picardy sweat." Other similar symptoms Tidy compared with Caius included the feeling of suffocation and pain in the abdomen and chest despite there being no physical abnormalities. There were also notable differences between the Picardy sweat and the English sweating sickness. It was accompanied by a rash, which was not described as a feature of the English disease. Henry Tidy argued that John Caius's report applies to fulminant cases fatal within a few hours, in which case no eruption may develop. The Picardy sweat appears to have had a different epidemiology from the English sweat in that individuals who slept close to the ground and/or lived on farms appeared more susceptible, supporting the theory that the disease could be rodent-borne, common in hantaviruses. In a 1906 outbreak of Picardy sweat, which struck 6,000 people, a commission led by bacteriologist André Chantemesse attributed infection to the fleas of field mice.

== Sources ==
- Bridgett, Thomas Edward (1904). Life and Writings of Blessed Thomas More, Lord Chancellor of England and Martyr Under Henry VIII. Original from the University of Wisconsin – Madison. p. 74.
