= Wingfield =

Wingfield may refer to:

== People ==
- Anthony Wingfield (disambiguation), multiple people
- Brenda Wingfield, South African geneticist
- Lady Bridget Wingfield (died 1534), neighbour, close friend and lady-in-waiting to Anne Boleyn, second wife of Henry VIII of England
- Cecil Wingfield (1893–1955), Australian politician
- Cecil Wingfield-Stratford (1853–1939), British Army officer, and footballer
- Sir Charles John Wingfield (1820–1892), British civil servant in Bengal, later an MP
- Sir Charles Wingfield (1877–1960), British diplomat
- Charlotte Wingfield (born 1994), Maltese Olympic sprinter
- Dick Wingfield-Digby (Richard Shuttleworth Wingfield-Digby; 1911–2007), Dean of Peterborough (1966–1980)
- Dontonio Wingfield (born 1974), former American professional basketball player
- Edward Wingfield (disambiguation), multiple people
- Eileen Wani Wingfield, Aboriginal elder from Australia
- Elizabeth Wingfield, 16th-century courtier
- Esmé Cecil Wingfield-Stratford (1882–1971), British historian
- Folliott Wingfield, 1st Viscount Powerscourt (1642–1717), Member of Parliament for Wicklow County
- Francis Wingfield or Wingfeild (1628–unknown), English lawyer and Member of Parliament
- George Wingfield (1876–1959), Nevada banker and miner
- Gus Wingfield (1926–2024), American banker and politician
- Harry Wingfield (John Henry Wingfield; 1910–2002), English illustrator
- Humphrey Wingfield (died 1545), English lawyer, Speaker of the House of Commons
- Ian Wingfield, Solicitor General of Hong Kong (2007–2010)
- Jacques Wingfield (1519-1587), English soldier who settled in Ireland
- James Digman Wingfield (1800–1872), English painter
- Jenny Wingfield, American screenwriter and author
- John Wingfield (disambiguation), multiple people
- Lewis Strange Wingfield (1842–1891), Irish traveller, actor, writer, and painter
- Margaret Wingfield (1912–2002), British political activist
- Mark Wingfield, guitarist and composer based in the UK
- Mervyn Wingfield (1911–2005), Royal Navy officer
- Martin Wingfield (born 1951), British politician
- Mervyn Wingfield, 7th Viscount Powerscourt (1836–1904), Irish peer
- Mervyn Wingfield, 8th Viscount Powerscourt (1880–1947), Irish peer
- Mervyn Patrick Wingfield, 9th Viscount Powerscourt (1905–1973), Irish peer
- Pete Wingfield (William Peter Wingfield; born 1948), British record producer, musician and music journalist
- Peter Wingfield (born 1962), Welsh-born television actor
- R. D. Wingfield (1928–2007), English author and radio dramatist
- Richard Wingfield (disambiguation), multiple people
- Robert Wingfield (disambiguation), multiple people
- Rupert Wingfield-Hayes (born 1967), British journalist
- Sheila Wingfield (1906–1992), Anglo-Irish poet
- Ted Wingfield (1899–1975), American baseball pitcher
- Thomas Wingfield (disambiguation), multiple people
- Wade Wingfield (born 1977), South African former cricketer
- Walter Clopton Wingfield (1833–1912), British army officer who was one of the pioneers of lawn tennis
- William Wingfield (disambiguation), multiple people
- Wingfield baronets, an extinct title in the Baronetage of England

== Places ==
=== Australia ===
- Wingfield, South Australia

=== England ===
- Wingfield, Bedfordshire
- Wingfield, Rotherham, South Yorkshire
  - Wingfield Academy
- Wingfield, Suffolk
  - Wingfield Castle
- Wingfield, Wiltshire
- North Wingfield, Derbyshire
- South Wingfield, Derbyshire
  - Wingfield Manor
  - Wingfield railway station, a former station

=== South Africa ===
- SAS Wingfield, a South African Navy base
- Wingfield Aerodrome, Cape Town, South Africa

=== United States ===
- Wingfield High School, Jackson, Mississippi
- Wingfield Township, Geary County, Kansas

== Other uses ==
- Wingfield Sculls, a sculling race for the Championship of the Thames
- Wingfield Series, plays by Dan Needles
- The Wingfield family, protagonists of Tennessee Williams' The Glass Menagerie
