= Anthony Wingfield (disambiguation) =

Anthony Wingfield was an English MP for Suffolk and Horsham.

Anthony Wingfield may also refer to:

- Anthony Wingfield (d. 1593), usher and Black Rod
- Anthony Wingfield (died 1605), Member of Parliament (MP) for Orford, Dunwich and Suffolk
- Anthony Wingfield (MP for Ripon) (c. 1550–c. 1615), MP for Ripon
- Sir Anthony Wingfield, 1st Baronet (c. 1585–1638) of the Wingfield baronets
- Sir Anthony Wingfield (1857–1952), High Sheriff of Bedfordshire

== See also ==
- Wingfield (disambiguation)
