= River Kym =

River in Cambridgeshire, England

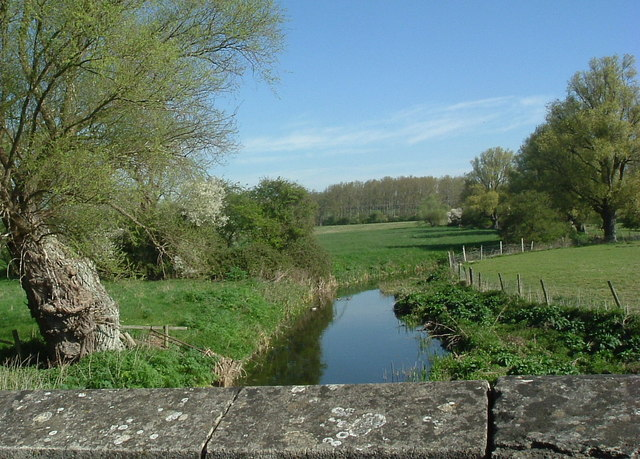
- River Kym near Great Staughton

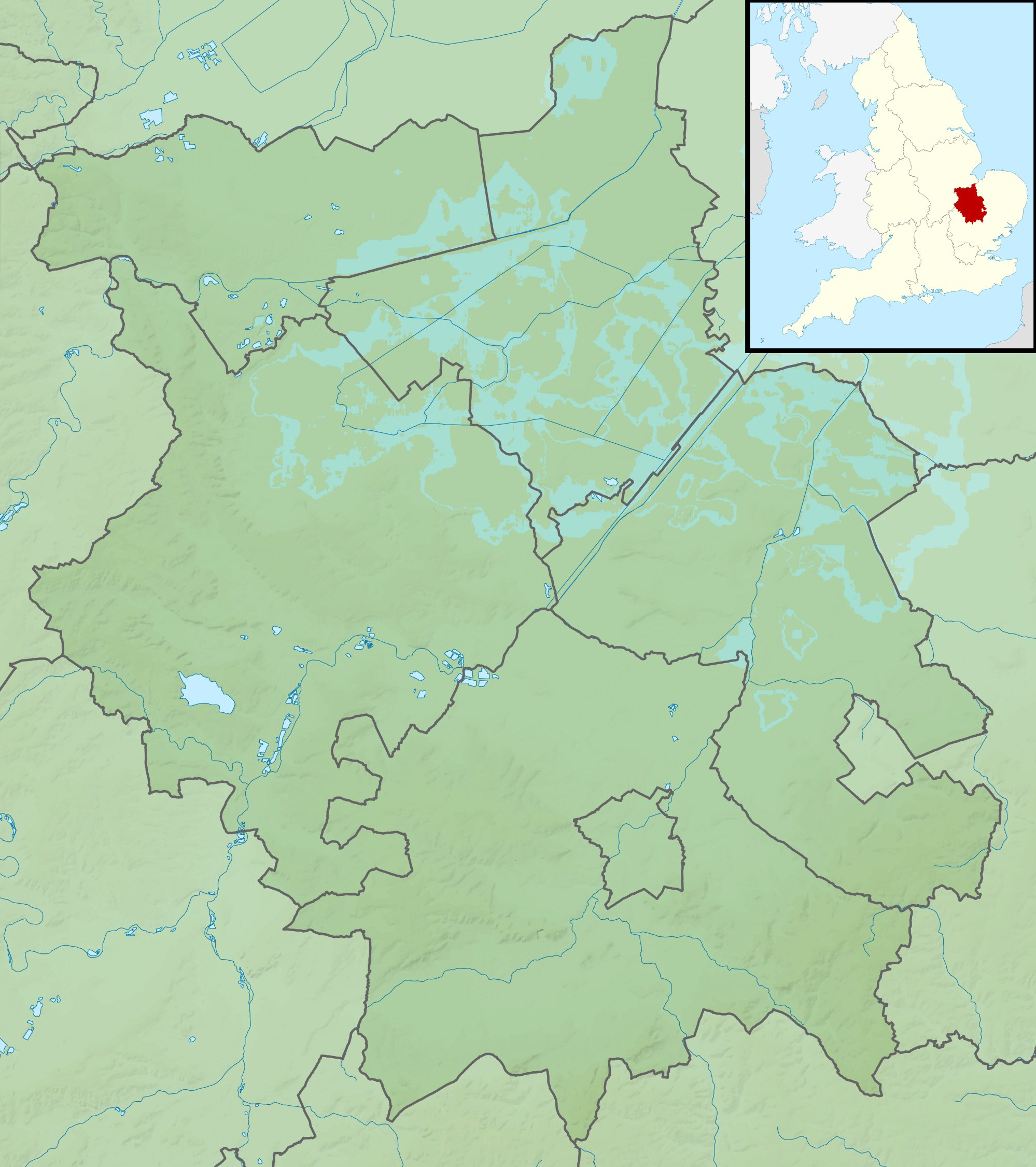
- Location of the mouth within Cambridgeshire

Location
- Country: United Kingdom
- County: Cambridgeshire

Physical characteristics
- Source
  - location: Newton Bromswold
  - coordinates: 52.2618°N 0.5745°W
  - elevation: 95 m (312 ft)
- Mouth: Great Ouse
  - location: St Neots
  - coordinates: 52.239°N 0.270°W
  - elevation: 13 m (43 ft)
- Length: 32 km (20 mi)

Basin features
- River system: Great Ouse

The River Kym is a river in Cambridgeshire, England. It flows through the village of Tilbrook, to Kimbolton, and joins the Great Ouse at St Neots. It is known as the River Til in its upper reaches, tributaries include the Pertenhall Brook.

== Course ==
Rising right on the Northamptonshire-Bedfordshire border at the west of the parish of Newton Bromswold, it flows north-east to cross into Bedfordshire at Yelden and then into Cambridgeshire at Tilbrook. Turning south east, it divides the town of Kimbolton in two and runs past Kimbolton Castle to Stonely. It next flows past the parish church of St Andrew to the west of Great Staughton, encircling the village to the south. It flows into the Great Ouse just to the north of St Neots, where it forms the parish boundary between St Neots and Little Paxton.

== History ==
The name of the river seems to be a back-formation from the town of Kimbolton, whose name means "farmstead of a man called Cynebald", so it is clear that the town is not named after the river.

== See also ==
- List of rivers of England
