= Richard Wingfield =

Early Tudor courtier

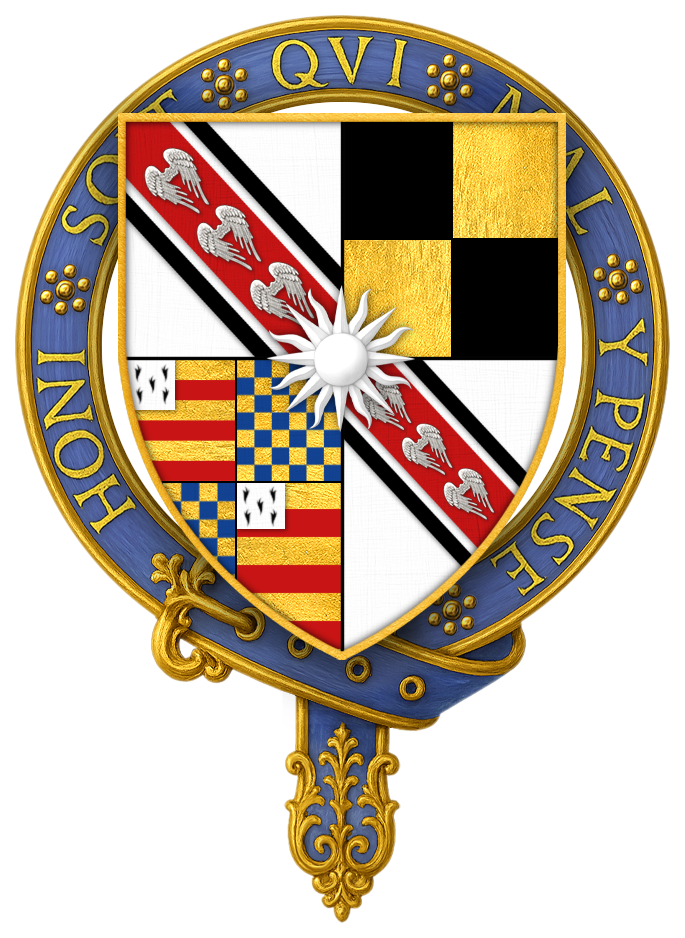
Coat of arms of Sir Richard Wingfield, KG

Sir Richard Wingfield KG of Kimbolton Castle (c. 1469 – 22 July 1525) was an influential courtier and diplomat in the early years of the Tudor dynasty of England which included being England's Ambassador to France.

== Life ==
The Wingfield family originated from the Suffolk village of Wingfield and built the main family residence, Wingfield Castle.

Richard was born at Letheringham, Suffolk to Sir John Wingfield (c. 1428 – 10 May 1481) member of the Privy Council of Edward IV, and Sheriff of Norfolk and Suffolk, and his wife Elizabeth FitzLewis (c. 1431 – 1497) who was born in West Horndon, Essex, to John FitzLewis and Anne Montague. He was the eleventh of twelve sons; his brothers included Sir John Wingfield, Henry Wingfield, William Wingfield, Sir Thomas Wingfield, Sir Robert Wingfield (a diplomat), Sir Walter Wingfield, Sir Edward Wingfield (who was married to one of the Woodville sisters, however historical documents are unclear as to which one), Sir Humphrey Wingfield (a lawyer and Speaker of the House of Commons) and Lewis Wingfield. His paternal grandparents were Sir Robert Wingfield and Elizabeth Goushill, who was a daughter of Sir Robert Goushill of Hoveringham in Nottinghamshire, by his wife Elizabeth Fitzalan, who herself was the granddaughter of Elizabeth of Rhuddlan.

Wingfield attended the University of Cambridge and, according to a letter dated 1516, thereafter went to the University of Ferrara. Following his university studies, it's thought he studied law at Gray's Inn as John Dugdale, who wrote "Origines Juridiciales", stated that there were 15 lay armorial windows in Gray's Inn Chapel (some now in the hall) and mentioned the coat of arms of Richard Wingfield being twice blazoned in the hall window.

Wingfield was one of the major landowners in Huntingdonshire and during his lifetime, he was also given manors and lands that had previously belonged to Elizabeth, Countess of Oxford and the Duke of Buckingham. He also was given Kimbolton Castle. It was at Kimbolton that Catherine of Aragon lived for the last few years of her life, having been transferred there due to her complaints about Buckden Towers being unhealthy. It's believed that it may have been Wingfield's cousin, Charles Brandon, 1st Duke of Suffolk, who suggested to the king that Catherine live at Kimbolton, as it was a family residence. As Brandon was also secretly sympathetic to Catherine's plight, it may have been a way of assisting Catherine in her hour of need without raising the king's suspicion. Catherine remained at Kimbolton until her death in 1536. By that time, Richard himself was dead and the castle was owned by his eldest son, Charles. It was the Wingfields who, in part, organised and attended her funeral at Peterborough Cathedral as per her official title of Dowager Princess of Wales. Eleanor Brandon, daughter of Wingfield's cousin Charles Brandon and his wife Mary Tudor, acted as chief mourner.

Wingfield became a courtier during the reign of Henry VII of England. He married Katherine Woodville in early 1496. She was daughter to Richard Woodville, 1st Earl Rivers and Jacquetta of Luxembourg, sister to Elizabeth Woodville, sister-in-law to Edward IV and widow of both Henry Stafford, 2nd Duke of Buckingham, and Jasper Tudor, 1st Duke of Bedford. The marriage made Wingfield an uncle to the Queen Consort, Elizabeth of York. With Wingfield's marriage to Katherine taking place only about 8 weeks after the death of her second husband, it's thought that Katherine's third and final marriage was for love, unlike her two previous arranged marriages. Wingfield outlived Katherine and was a widower for a significant number of years before he married his second wife, Bridget Wiltshire. Wingfield's older brother Edward was also married to one of the Woodville sisters, but it is unclear which one. It may have been through this link that Richard met Katherine.

Wingfield, together with his older brothers, John and Robert, fought against the Cornish rebels in the Cornish rebellion of 1497.

In 1500, he was among the esquires of the body who accompanied Henry VII to a meeting with Archduke Philip of Austria just outside Calais to address political issues as well as to strengthen English-Burgundian interests.

On 10 March 1505 he arrived at Rome on a pilgrimage, accompanied by his older brother, Robert, and an illegitimate half-brother, also called Richard.

In 1507, he was sent to the Netherlands in order to attempt the arrangement of a marriage between Archduke Charles of Austria and Princess Mary Tudor of England, to secure a dynastic alliance between the Tudors and the rising Habsburgs. Mary was betrothed to Charles in 1507 but it was called off several years later in 1514, due to the stalling of the Hapsburgs because of Charles's weak health. Mary was instead married to Louis XII of France the same year. Charles never really forgave his family and advisors for causing him to lose one of Europe's most beautiful princesses, but always remained close to Wingfield who had tried to secure the marriage. In an unexpected twist of fate, Wingfield's cousin, Charles Brandon, became Mary's second husband after the death of Louis XII.

Wingfield was made Lord Deputy of Calais in 1511. With Sir Edward Poynings and others he was sent in 1512 to arrange a Holy League between Pope Julius II, the English king and other European sovereigns. Wingfield was mainly occupied in discharging his duties at Calais, but in 1519 he resigned his post there and returned to England.

In 1520, Wingfield was appointed English ambassador to France (to the court of Francis I of France), taking over the role from Thomas Boleyn. He is known to have been involved in making arrangements for the meeting between Henry VIII of England and Francis at the Field of the Cloth of Gold the same year. The three Wingfield cousins: Sir Richard who was England's Ambassador to France, Charles Brandon who was Duke of Suffolk and brother-in-law to the king and Thomas Wolsey, Cardinal, Papal Legate and Lord Chancellor, all played a prominent role in the proceedings.

He twice visited Emperor Charles V in 1521 in an effort to convince him against declaring war on Francis I.

As Charles V was a friend of Wingfield, he made it known to Henry that he wished Wingfield to become a Knight of the Garter, which Henry duly did in 1522. The future Ferdinand I, Holy Roman Emperor was the only other Knight created during that year. Charles also offered Wingfield a pension of 1,000 livres the same year.

Wingfield was made Chancellor of the Duchy of Lancaster in 1524. For his services, he was granted lands throughout England, notably Kimbolton Castle, which was further expanded by him. In late 1524, Wingfield was elected High Steward of the University of Cambridge. The university had initially promised the post to Sir Thomas More, but the king wished Wingfield to be appointed, so More withdrew his candidature. Hugh Latimer, a friend of Wingfield's, had once noted that Richard had a "high regard for literary men" but on this occasion wrote to Dr. Grene, master of St. Catharine's College declaring "Who has more influence with the king than Wingfield?"

In 1525, Wingfield was sent by Henry VIII on a mission to the Spanish court at Toledo together with Bishop Cuthbert Tunstall to suggest an joint invasion of France which would then be carved up between Henry VIII and Charles. They also went to consolidate Charles's 1522 betrothal to Henry's daughter, the Princess Mary. Wingfield and Tunstall had an audience with Charles immediately upon their arrival at Toledo, 24 May. Whilst there, Wingfield contracted dysentry in July, but despite feeling unwell, he forced himself to attend a banquet. However he collapsed with a fever afterwards and died there on 22 July 1525. Wingfield's funeral was supposedly very elaborate and, as a mark of Charles V's favour, he was buried at the church of the Friars Observants of San Juan de los Reyes at Toledo. According to Tunstall's description to Henry VIII, Wingfield was buried within the circuit of the choir "whiche place is foundyd and reservyd for buryall oonly of Kinges ... and never bifore was grauntyd to no pryvate person."

After his death, his widow, Bridget, married Sir Nicholas Harvey of Ickworth. Her third and last husband was Sir Robert Tyrwhitt of Kettleby.

== Family ==
Wingfield married Katherine, née Woodville, shortly after the 1495 death of her second husband, Jasper Tudor; she was a sister of Queen Elizabeth Woodville. Katherine died in 1497, and Wingfield was a widower for some time. He married in about 1513, his second wife, Bridget Wiltshire, daughter and heiress of Sir John Wiltshire of Stone Castle and Isabella Clothall. They had:

- Charles Wingfield of Kimbolton Castle (1513 – 24 May 1540). He married Joan Knollys, a sister to Sir Francis Knollys and sister-in-law to Lady Catherine Carey, who was first cousin to Elizabeth I.
- Thomas Maria Wingfield of Stonely Priory, Huntingdonshire. A Member of Parliament. He first married Margaret, widow of naval captain William Sabyn, and also a Member of Parliament for Ipswich with Edmund Daundy who was related to the Wingfields. His second wife was Margaret Kerrye. The unusual middle name of Maria was due to he fact he was named after both his godparents, Thomas after Thomas Wolsey to whom the Wingfields were related and Maria after Mary Tudor, Queen of France, wife of Charles Brandon, Duke of Suffolk who was a cousin of Thomas's father. Thomas Maria Wingfield was the father of Edward Maria Wingfield soldier, Member of Parliament, and English colonist in Virginia.
- Jacques Wingfield of Stone Castle (c. 1519–1587?). A politician first known for long-term service to Stephen Gardiner, Bishop of Winchester.
- Lawrence Henry Wingfield.
- Jane Wingfield. Married first Thomas Worlich of Alconbury and secondly Francis Roe.
- Mary Wingfield.
- Margaret Wingfield. She married first Sir Thomas Newman and secondly a son of the Moyle family.
- Anne Wingfield. She married into the Maidenhead family.
- Elizabeth Wingfield. She married into the Latimer family.
- Catherine Wingfield.

== Sources ==
- Baldwin, David (2011). Elizabeth Woodville, Mother of the Princes in the Tower. History Press.
- Leadam, I.S. (1900). "Wingfield, Richard (1469?-1525)" . In Lee, Sidney (ed.). Dictionary of National Biography. Vol. 62. London: Smith, Elder & Co. pp. 187–190.
- Dunlop, Robert (1900). "Wingfield, Richard (d.1634)" . In Lee, Sidney (ed.). Dictionary of National Biography. Vol. 62. London: Smith, Elder & Co. pp. 190–191.
- Robertson, Mary L. "Wingfield, Sir Richard (b. in or before 1469, d. 1525)". Oxford Dictionary of National Biography (online ed.). Oxford University Press. doi:10.1093/ref:odnb/29739. (Subscription, Wikipedia Library access or UK public library membership required.)

Political offices
Preceded by Henry Marney, 1st Baron Marney	Chancellor of the Duchy of Lancaster; 1523–1525	Succeeded by Sir Thomas More
