= Higham Ferrers branch line =

Railway branch

The Higham Ferrers branch line was a short railway branch built in Northamptonshire, England, by the Midland Railway to serve the industrial towns of Rushden and Higham Ferrers. It was originally intended to continue the line to Raunds, but that was frustrated by the refusal of a landowner to release his land.

The line opened in 1893 for goods traffic and 1894 for passengers. For some time a thriving passenger and goods business developed, helping the towns to expand. The passenger service operated as a shuttle to and from Wellingborough. As road transport became practical in the 1930s and subsequently, the usage of the line declined, although heavy mineral traffic remained buoyant. Nevertheless, the line was closed to passenger operation in 1959, although some factories' holiday special trains ran annually after that. Goods and mineral traffic ended in 1969.

The station site at Rushden has been acquired by a heritage railway group.

== Origins ==
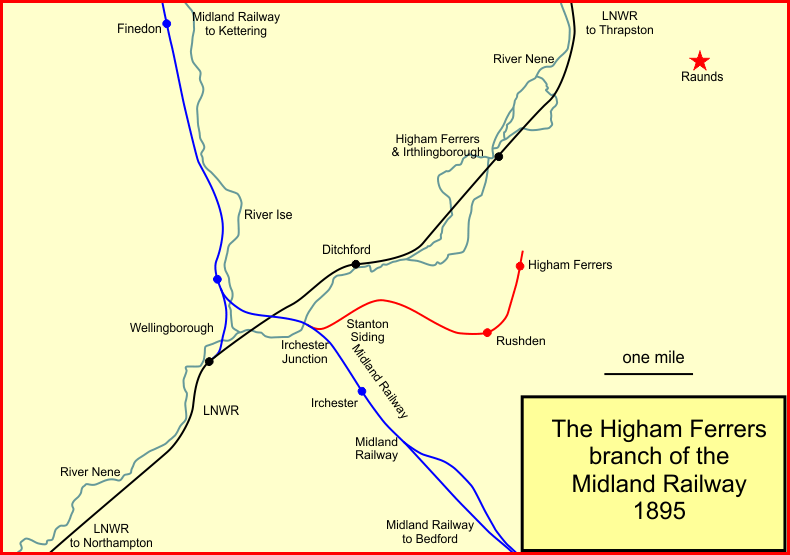
Ferrers branch in 1895

Higham Ferrers is an old market town, but like the adjacent town of Rushden it was by-passed by main line railways. Both towns were heavily engaged in the footwear industry, and by the second half of the nineteenth century, an industrialised town without convenient railway transport was at a clear competitive disadvantage.

The first railway nearby was the Northampton and Peterborough Railway, promoted by the London and Birmingham Railway and opened in 1845. It had a station named Higham Ferrers, but it was more than 1 mile (1.6 km) from Higham Ferrers and 3 miles (4.8 km) from Rushden. It was later renamed Irthlingborough.

The Midland Railway opened its north–south main line in 1857 and provided a station at Irchester; this too was inconvenient and distant, although it was nearer Rushden.

Local business interests saw that their towns were at a disadvantage in not having direct railway access; moreover the transport of coal and other heavy supplies added considerably to their cost. Repeated requests were made to the Midland Railway to build a branch line. This the Midland Railway were reluctant to do; they had priorities elsewhere at the time, and experience had shown that short rural branch lines did not pay. Moreover, the Midland Railway main line in the area was heavily congested, in particular due to the heavy volume of coal traffic being carried.

The Midland main line was quadrupled (making four tracks) in a project that was completed in December 1883. This provided considerable relief to the problem of congestion on the main line.

== Construction and opening ==
After continued persistent requests from local interests the Midland Railway agreed to make a branch line; this was authorised as a double track line in 1890. It was referred to as the Irchester and Raunds Branch: the Midland Railway's intention was to make it from a junction south of Wellingborough on the main line, through Rushden and Higham Ferrers, continuing to Raunds and making a junction at Raunds station on its Kettering to Huntingdon line, which had opened in 1866 Raunds station was more than 2 miles (3.2 km) from the town it purported to serve.

Construction started in 1892. Useful iron ore deposits were available near the junction with the main line, and some months prior to the branch opening fully, from 3 July 1893, some train movements took place on the stub of the branch to remove the mineral.

The line was completed as far as Higham Ferrers, and goods traffic started operation on 1 September 1893. Passenger train operation followed on 1 May 1894, in both cases as far as Higham Ferrers only, a distance of 3 1/2 miles (5.6 km). The intended continuation to Raunds was abandoned, because the owner of lands required for the line made such obstruction to the sale of his property, and the Midland Railway did not proceed with construction beyond Higham Ferrers. The intended double track was also not proceeded with, and the branch was single track only.

== Operation ==
There was no station at Irchester Junction on the four-track Midland Railway main line, where the branch connected with the Slow Lines only; the location was immediately south of the River Nene bridge. The train service ran from Higham Ferrers to Wellingborough, consisting of six trains each way at first, increasing to ten by 1901.<Peter Butler, A History of the Railways of Northamptonshire Pages 94 to 97> The arrival of the railway encouraged development in both Higham Ferrers and Rushden, and populations increased, but Rushden started with a larger population and maintained that advantage.

The concentration in Rushden of large industrial employers in a town of moderate size encouraged co-ordinated annual holiday breaks and in 1934, one of Rushden's leading shoe manufacturers chartered three special trains to take more than 1,000 employees and their families to Brighton for the day. These works specials continued after World War II.

Wellingborough was the local main commercial town locally, but the station in Wellingborough is not conveniently sited for the town, and when local bus services became available in the 1930s and afterwards, passenger usage on the branch declined steeply.

In the summer of 1952 British Railways started a through service from Higham Ferrers to Leicester. This brought the sight of a large passenger locomotive with a long train on the branch on a regular basis. However the through train did not work back to Higham Ferrers; passengers had to return on the ordinary service trains and change at Wellingborough.

Then in 1954 the usual steam-worked branch train was replaced by a three-coach diesel multiple unit, but this seems to have been unsuccessful and steam operation was reinstated.

== Decline and closure ==
It became unsustainable to continue with passenger operation in the face of road competition, and the passenger service was discontinued on 15 June 1959.

Factories continued to charter special trains for workers' summer holidays, to Blackpool and Great Yarmouth on Saturdays in the town's holiday fortnight, and this arrangement continued until 1964. General goods traffic operated until 3 February 1969. Iron ore concentrate had been a local specialised traffic but that too ceased on 3 November 1969.

A significant factor in the downturn of the branch line economics was the conversion of domestic gas to natural gas in 1968, meaning that the town gas works no longer required deliveries of coal.

After closure part of the route at Rushden was acquired by an enthusiasts' group; it now operates as a heritage railway called "The Rushden, Higham and Wellingborough Railway". In 2022 its website states that it "presently has 1/2 mile (0.80 km) of track".

== Locations ==
- Irchester Junction; divergence from Midland main line;
- Rushden; opened 1 May 1894; closed 15 June 1959;
- Higham Ferrers; opened 1 May 1894; closed for regular use 15 June 1959; last public excursion 3 August 1964.
