= Edward Maria Wingfield =

Early colonial governor in Virginia (1550–1631)

Captain Edward Maria Wingfield
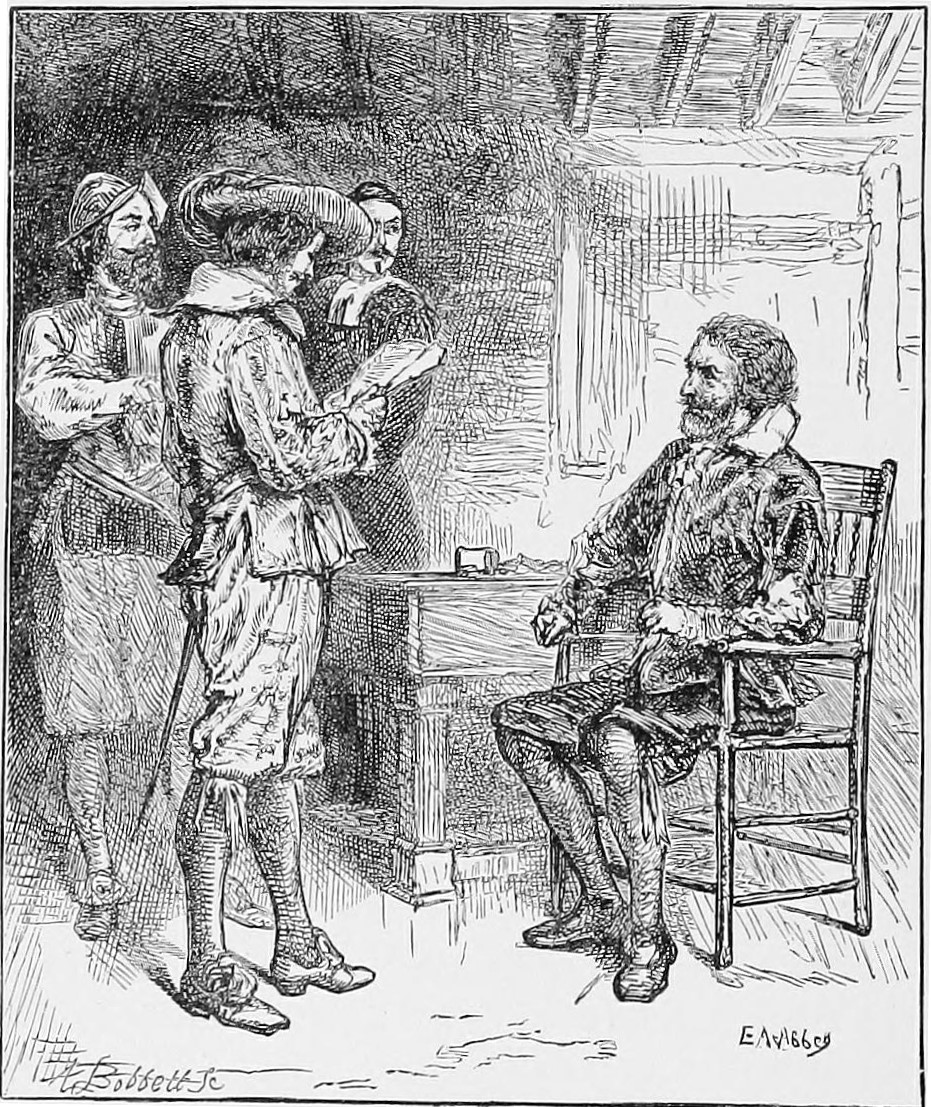
- Depiction of Edward Maria Wingfield (seated)

Governor of the Colony of Virginia
- In office 1607–1607
- Succeeded by: John Ratcliffe

Personal details
- Born: 1550 Stonely, Huntingdonshire, England
- Died: 1631 (aged 81) Kimbolton, Cambridgeshire, England
- Known for: "A Discourse of Virginia"

Edward Maria Wingfield (1550–1631) was a soldier, Member of Parliament (1593), and English colonist in America. He was the son of Thomas Maria Wingfield, and the grandson of Richard Wingfield.

Captain John Smith wrote that from 1602 to 1603 Wingfield was one of the early and prime movers and organisers in "showing great charge and industry" in getting the Virginia Venture moving,he was one of the four incorporators for the London Virginia Company in the Virginia Charter of 1606 and one of its biggest financial backers. He recruited (with his cousin, Captain Bartholomew Gosnold) about forty of the 104 would be colonists, and was the only shareholder to sail. In the first election in the New World, he was elected by his peers as the President of the governing council for one year beginning 13 May 1607, of what became the first successful, English-speaking colony in the New World at Jamestown, Virginia.

After four months, on 10 September, because "he ever held the men to working, watching, and warding", and because of lack of food, death from disease, and attack by the "naturals" (during the worst famine and drought for 800 years), Wingfield was made a scapegoat and was deposed on petty charges. On the return of the Supply Boat on 10 April 1608, Wingfield was sent back to London to answer the charge of being an atheist, and one suspected of having Spanish sympathies. Smith's prime biographer, Philip L. Barbour, however, wrote of the "superlative pettiness of the charges... none of the accusations amounting to anything." Wingfield cleared his reputation, was named in the Second Virginia Charter, 1609, and was active in the Virginia Company until 1620, when he was 70 years old.

He died in England in 1631, ten weeks before fellow Jamestown settler John Smith, and was buried on 13 April at St Andrew's Parish Church, Kimbolton.

== Early life ==
Coat of Arms of Edward Maria Wingfield

Wingfield was born in 1550 at Stonely Priory (dissolved ca. 1536), near Kimbolton, Huntingdonshire (present-day Cambridgeshire), the eldest son of Thomas Maria Wingfield, the Elder, and Margaret (née Kaye; from Woodsome, Yorkshire). and was raised as a Protestant His middle name, "Maria" (pronounced [mah-RYE-uh]), was inherited from his father who had been named after both his godparents, Thomas after Thomas Wolsey a member of the Wingfield family on his mother's side and Maria, derived from Mary Tudor, Queen of France who was related to the Wingfields by marriage as her husband, Charles Brandon, 1st Duke of Suffolk, was part of the Wingfield family.

Edward's father, Thomas Maria Wingfield, MP (who had in 1536 renounced his calling as a priest), died when Edward was seven years old. Before he was twelve years of age, his mother remarried, to James Cruwys of Fotheringhay, Northamptonshire, who became his guardian; yet the father figure in his early years appears to have been his uncle, Jacques Wingfield, one of six contemporary martial Wingfields.

=== Colonisation in Ireland ===
Jacques Wingfield was from 1559 to 1560 until his death in 1587, Master of the Ordnance in Ireland, Constable of Dublin Castle and an Irish privy councillor. When Edward Maria was 19 years old he apparently accompanied his uncle, one of the key settlers involved in building a plantation in Munster, Ireland, with Sir Humphrey Gilbert and Sir John Popham, among others. His uncle held Wickham Skeith, a manor in Suffolk, next to the future living of the great geographer, Richard Hakluyt, the Younger at Wetheringsett – both some ten miles (16 km) from Letheringham Old Hall, the ancestral home of the Wingfield family, and from Otley Hall, ancestral home of the Wingfields' cousins, the Gosnold family (four miles from Letheringham).

=== Law school ===
In 1575–76, Wingfield returned to England, where in 1576 he was admitted to Lincoln's Inn, the law school, having first passed through its "feeder", Furnivall's Inn. Before completing his legal training, the lure of the drum called him to the Low Countries.

=== Soldiering in the Netherlands ===
Alongside his brother, Captain Thomas Maria Wingfield, for at least four years, Edward fought as a foot company commander (i.e. commander of 100 pike-wielding soldiers) in the Low Countries for the Dutch Republic against Spanish invaders, including in 1586 at the Battle of Zutphen, thereby gaining experience in the defence of forts and in skirmishing. He, his brother and Sir William Drury, were noted in the Army Roll of 1589 as "captains of success". In the first half of 1588 he was taken prisoner together with the virginiaphile Sir Ferdinando Gorges (later Governor of Plymouth), at or near Bergen-op-Zoom, and was held in Spanish captivity with him, first at Ghent and then at Lille until on 5 September 1588 when ransoms were demanded. Nine weeks later his brother captured two Spanish officers at Bergen, but was not permitted by the Allied Commander-in-Chief, Peregrine Bertie, 13th Baron Willoughby de Eresby, to exchange them (though he was mysteriously paid later). He and Gorges were, however, no earlier than June 1589, released as part of a prisoner exchange.

=== Soldiering in Ireland ===
In the 1590s, Captain Wingfield was garrisoned at Drogheda, Ireland – where commanders reported for pay, rations and munitions to the Clerk of the Cheque & Muster-Master, Colonel Sir Ralph Lane, the former Deputy Governor of Sir Walter Ralegh's ill-fated 1584–86 Roanoke Colony (in modern-day North Carolina). Lane was Wingfield's father's old neighbour in Orlingbury, near Kimbolton.

=== Service in Parliament ===
In 1593, Wingfield was a member of parliament for Chippenham, Wiltshire, one of five Wingfield family MPs – a seat obtained for him by his neighbour, Anthony Mildmay of Apethorpe, probably encouraged by Wingfield's cousin, Sir Robert Cecil. He may have sat on a committee considering cloth in March, but this (and parliament) he decided was not for him, and he returned shortly afterward to the soldier's life at the Dundalk Garrison in Ireland.

=== Kimbolton School Governor ===
Wingfield was a Feoffee, or Governor, of Kimbolton School in 1600 – which riled his old fellow-colonist from 1569 in Ireland, Sir John Popham, a keen promoter of Virginia; and indeed they clashed over getting their own men onto the school's Board of Governors. Popham had just banished Sir Edward to County Galway for life, for the part he had played in the Revolt of the Earl of Essex in 1599, doubtless telling him that this would prevent his being executed, and sequestered Kimbolton Castle, sending his family to their London house at St. Andrew's, Holborn. Despite his pleas, Queen Elizabeth I never permitted Sir Edward to return home.

== Organizing the Virginia Expedition ==
=== Getting the Virginia Expedition Moving ===
Although Sir Thomas Gates was later hailed by Sir Edwin Sandys as the "principle forwarder" of the London Virginia Company, Captain John Smith wrote in his General Historie that, when in 1605–06 the Jamestown expedition was making no progress, Wingfield got it moving: "Captain Bartholomew Gosnold (Wingfield's second cousin), one of the first movers of this plantation, having many years solicited many friends, but found small assistance; Gosnold at last prevailed with some gentlemen, Capt John Smith, Mr Edward-Maria Wingfield, Mr Reverend Robert Hunt, and diverse others, who depended a year upon his projects, but nothing could be effected, till by their great charge and industry, it came to be apprehended by certain of the Nobility, Gentry and Merchants, so that His Majesty by his letters patents, gave permission for establishing Councils, to direct here; and to govern, and to execute there."

It has been posited that Cecil, Hakluyt and others were concerned that they should not have a leader like the Earl of Essex, who might set up his own kingdom in Virginia, and therefore sought out an old retired military man instead. (Bartholomew Gosnold's next brother, Captain Wingfield Gosnold, was not to sail with the expedition). Gosnold (aka Gosnell) may have been "Captain Gosnell" who, in 1604 at a dinner in the Isle of Wight made some "intemperate" comment about the King, so perhaps causing important people to shun him. There is no record of Smith (or indeed Hunt) doing anything special, but Gabriel Archer, who was on Gosnold's 1602 "Cape Cod Expedition", had in that year been active in recruitment in London.

Wingfield was involved in fundraising and was one of the biggest backers of the venture, with family friends, Sir Thomas Gates, Sir William Waad (aka Wade) (Lieutenant-Governor of the Tower of London), Sir Thomas Smythe (Treasurer of the Virginia Company), John Martin, Sr., Sir Oliver Cromwell and Captain John Ratcliffe (aka Sicklemore). Barbour wrote: "John Smith was unaware, always, of the importance of the lever – the legal and financial backing that got the voyage going."

=== Recruiting settlers ===
In 1606, without Wingfield's input through his extensive influential contacts, it is possible that the expedition might never have sailed. In 1605–06 Wingfield and his cousin Bartholomew Gosnold, recruited about 40% of the 105 settlers. Most of the would-be gentlemen settlers were impecunious younger sons without prospects, but more than a dozen gentleman (as Dr. John Horn observes), and Captain John Martin ... "clearly were gentlemen with other motives, perhaps just the adventure in its own right".

Wingfield obtained the approval of Richard Bancroft, Archbishop of Canterbury, his old London vicar at St. Andrew's, Holborn, for the Reverend Robert Hunt of Old Heathfield (who was in disgrace from his arrival there in 1602 for immorality with his servant, Thomasina Plumber, and for absenteeism and thereby neglect of his congregation). This recruitment may have been with the help of Richard Hakluyt, Jr., who was also due to sail, or maybe he was volunteered by Wingfield's cousin-by-marriage the 3rd Lord De La Warr, the future Governor-General of Jamestown; and Hunt had his will witnessed by a Tristram Sicklemore, so may have already known John Sicklemore aka Ratcliffe. The Archbishop's approval was dated as late as 24 November 1606 – yet, sadly, at the very last moment Hakluyt, the senior of the two priests, backed out.

=== Catholics debarred from colonisation ===
Despite the fact Sir Thomas Howard (Lord Southampton's brother-in-law) and Baron Arundell, both Roman Catholics, as well as Sir Ferdinando Gorges, had funded the spring 1605 expedition to Allan's Island (in present-day Newfoundland), designed to establish a colony for British Catholicism, there is absolutely no way that Wingfield or indeed Hunt (described by Wingfield as "a man not in any way to be touched with the rebellious humours of a popish spirit, nor blemished with the least suspicion of a factious schismatic, whereof I had a special care"), could have had Catholic or Non-conformist leanings, the more so in the wake of the previous year's Catholic Gunpowder Plot. All would-be colonists had to subscribe to the Oath of Allegiance and the Oath of Supremacy of 1559, which denied the doctrine of the Pope's authority, in both deposing rulers and in absolving Englishmen from their allegiance. Indeed the latter oath debarred Roman Catholics from participation in Anglo-American colonisation – until George Calvert, a Catholic convert, founded Maryland for persecuted Roman Catholics and Puritans in 1634.

=== Getting the Expedition legalised ===
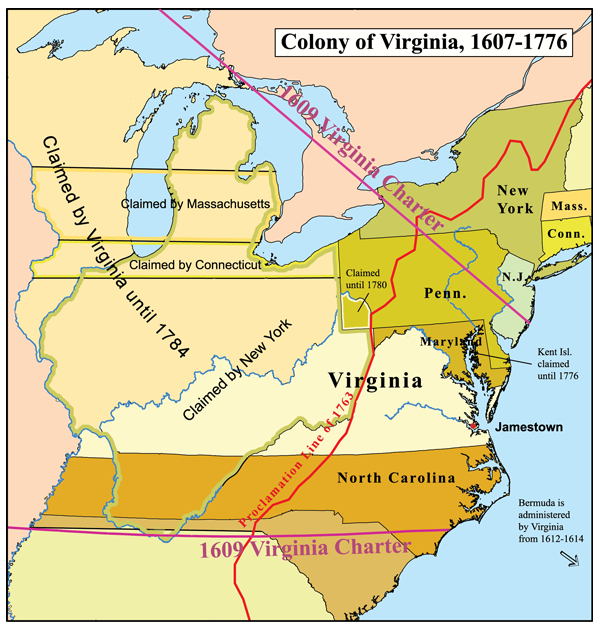
"Virginia" was the term for all of British America in 1607.

The 1606 Charter. On 10 April 1606, Wingfield was one of eight "incorporators" of the Virginia Company, who "prayed His Majesty to incorporate them, and to enable them to raise a joint stake". Divided into two missions, four men sub-incorporated as the Virginia Company of London and four as the Virginia Company of Plymouth, which would attempt to found a colony at Kennebec River. The four for the London (Jamestown) Company, besides Wingfield, being Richard Hakluyt, Sir Thomas Gates and Sir George Somers – (i.e. these suitors ensured the legality of the Company). They prayed His Majesty to incorporate them, and to enable them to raise a joint stake.

The Charter stated: "James, by the grace of God, King of England ... Whereas our loving and well disposed subjects, Sir Thomas Gates, and Sir George Somers, Knights, Richard Hackluit, Clerk...and Edward Maria Wingfield, Esq... have been humble suitors unto us, that we would vouchsafe unto them and may in time bring the infidels and savages in those parts, to human civility, and to a settled and quiet government, Do, by these our letters patent, graciously accept of, & agree to, their humble and well intended desires....and do therefore, for Us, our heirs and successors, Grant and agree, that the said Sir Thomas Gates, Sir George Somers, Richard Hackluit, [sic] and Edward Maria Wingfield, adventurers of and for our city of London... shall and may begin their said first plantation...and seat of their first abode & habitation ... Richard Hakluyt, Edward Maria Wingfield, [etc.]: Adventurers... of and for our City of London, and such others as are or shall be joined unto them of that Colony... shall and may begin their said first Plantation and Seat of that first Abode and Habitation, at any place upon the said coast of Virginia, where they shall think fit and convenient between the said four and thirty and one and forty [34–41] degrees of the said Latitude..."

He and his fellow incorporators were licensed by King James I to "make habitation, plantation and to deduce a colony in that part of America "commonly called Virginia, and other parts and territories not actually possessed by any Christian prince or people, between 34 and 45 degrees North and "shall and may inhabit and remain there, and shall build and fortify [there] ... "according to their best discretion" ... "and shall and lawfully may ... dig, mine and search for all manner of mines ... yielding to us ... the fifth part only of all the same gold and silver and the fifteenth part of all the same copper... and they shall or fully may establish and cause to be made a coin, to pass current there between people... with sufficient shipping, and furniture of armour, weapons, ordnance, powder, victuals" etc... The Charter went on to say: that Wingfield, Hakluyt, Gates and Somers could "encounter, repulse or repel and resist" all persons attempting to inhabit the said colonies "without especial licence" and that anyone they caught "trafficking" i.e. trading, should pay "five of every hundred of such wares". Anyone robbing or spoiling was to make restitution. Everything was to be in effect for 25 years before reverting to the Crown and all land was to be held of the Crown.

Wingfield apparently took a copy of the 1st Virginia Charter with him to Virginia, something that would have been provocative to a man like Gabriel Archer. Two days before he sailed – which was about the time that his Bible was stolen – he made over his estate at Stonely to seven friends and neighbours (including two Pophams and Hakluyt's friend and Wingfield's neighbour, Pickering) and five relations (including four Wingfields). For the southern colony (Jamestown) Wingfield was the only adventurer (one risking his means) and venturer (one risking his life) to sail. The four patentees for each of the two colonies (Jamestown, and Sagadahoc – in modern-day Maine) had, as stated above, "licence to make habitation, plantation and to deduce a colony." The two colonies were to be controlled by the King's Council of Virginia – which included not only the indomitable Sir Thomas Smythe, but also Wingfield's old comrade-in-arms and fellow Prisoner of War (for 18 months in 1588–1589) in Spanish captivity, Sir Ferdinando Gorges, and Wingfield's cousin-by-marriage, Lord de la Warr.

== Jamestown ==
=== Departure ===
Three little ships, the Susan Constant, the Discovery and the Godspeed sailed from Blackwall Dock, London under the overall command of Captain Christopher Newport on 19 December 1606 to found Jamestown; and "the fleet fell from London" on 20 December.

=== Commander for the Voyage only ===
The Council of Virginia had decreed on 10 September 1606 that Newport was commissioned and given by the Council "with the sole charge and command of all the captains and soldiers, and mariners, and other persons, that shall go in any of the said ships and pinnace in the said voyage from the day of the date hereof [i.e. 13 weeks prior to settling at Jamestown] until such time as they shall fortune 'to land' upon the said coast of Virginia." Newport, "was hired only for our transportation" (wrote Smith). From 26 April 1607 everyone knew who was a councillor, but not who was President – and knew that the first British presidential election was not to be before they had found "and landed" at a good site to settle. This was not a propitious beginning, and likely caused friction between the Councillors as they "jostled" to obtain votes.

=== Arrival ===
On 26 April 1607. "...the first land they made, they called Cape Henry" for Prince Henry, the young heir to the throne. Here Newport and Wingfied likely would have made a formal Declaration claiming Virginia for the Crown. That night the box was opened and the orders [dated 20 November 1606] read out. Wingfield [et al.] were to be on the Council and were to elect a President for a year from their number.

=== Reconnaissance and election ===
"Until 13 May they sought a place to plant in, then the Council was sworn, and Mr. Wingfield was chosen President, and an Oration made..." – by him, probably immediately after being sworn in. This was the first-ever democratic election by Europeans in the New World.

=== Command and control ===
At 57 Wingfield was about double the age of some of the Council. He had successfully petitioned the King for the Charter, was a "captain of success" in defence-works and skirmishing (patrolling) and was one of the expedition's main stockholders. Thus, he was the obvious choice for President. However, the line of Command and Control and of "Land and Sea Force Cooperation" was problematic, since the President was not to command the mariners (as Sir Richard Grenville had at Roanoke), and the handover details were "woolly".

=== A Soldier's siting ===
The Council in London had advised the settlers "to sit (set) down" possibly "on some island that is strong by nature... and not overburthened with woods... so far up as a bark (barque) of 50 tons will float ... perchance .. a hundred miles from the river's mouth" "with no native people to inhabit between you and the sea coast". Probably the key factor which swayed Wingfield into selecting Jamestown, was Ralph Lane's error at Roanoke in 1584, having the ships a mile from their camp – and, as an experienced soldier not wanting to split his force, therefore kept his heaviest ship with them. So, on 12 May, Wingfield vetoed Archer's Hope, the first site proposed, as too visible (thus easily bombarded by foreign ships' guns). At Jamestown, the ships could be secured to the overhanging trees – even the 120-ton Susan Constant. That Wingfield (who as a "suitor" was instructed by the King to site their "abode and habitation... and to begin their ...first plantation" at any place he thought "fit and convenient") succeeded in rejecting Archer's Hope (i.e. haven), and selected the present Jamestown site (some 50 miles (80 km) upriver), showed that he was a tough character.

=== Archer's Hope ===
Small in number, the colonists had to decide whether to concentrate their defences against either sea attack by the French and Spanish, or against possible assault from native tribes in the area. Archer's Hope would have been better for firing down on approaching Spanish ships (i.e. large targets), since it was higher than Wingfield's river-level island/isthmus site at Jamestown. But for warding off land or canoe attacks by the "naturals", Jamestown's low field of fire was more easily defended with infantry. Wingfield was a soldier experienced in warding off Spanish foot soldiers and Irish guerrillas in dyke or swampland. Since the Councillors were not yet sworn, after two weeks of everyone arguing the pros and cons of different sites, a decision had to be made before they developed into a rabble. Furthermore, only the Kecoughtan tribe lay between them and the coast, whereas if he had sited the settlement upstream, five further tribes would have cut them off from escape. Jamestown was described by Smith as "a very great place for the erecting of a great city" and by Hamor as "a good and fertile island".

=== Work and guard duties ===
During his presidency Wingfield had the James Fort constructed in a month and a day. Biographer Barbour claimed he had no proven military service – which is nonsense, since his long service in the military in Ireland and up to fifteen years in the Low Countries is listed in the Calendar of State Papers. Since of the dozen or so captains he was by far the most experienced soldier in defence-works and defensive warfare, Wingfield supervised the construction of the fort (140 yards by 100 yards (91 m) by 100 yards (91 m) plus three artillery "blisters" of 20 yards (18 m) each) – involving the felling of perhaps 500–600 30 ft-trees, cutting them in half and burying one end firmly in the ground: a vast task. During construction, George Kendall supervised a temporary defence-work of the felled "half-moon of trees and brushwood... the boughs of trees cast together" as cover, prior to the ends of the huge triangular palisade being "joined up", as was normal military practice. "Newport and Smith and twenty others were sent to discover the head of the river", wrote Smith (rather than "Newport decided to go exploring" – as so many books would have it). President Wingfield was now in charge, but before long his cousin Gosnold warned him that he was driving the men too hard, ever holding them to "working, watching, and warding."

=== Repulsing attack ===
27 May 1607: Belying Smith's statement that the weapons were kept boxed or casked, President Wingfield successfully repulsed a fierce, hour-long attack on Jamestown, leading from the front. Outnumbered 3:1 – with but 130 men and boys – he drove off 400 native warriors. "... And our President, Mr Wynckfeild (who showed himself a valiant Gentleman), had one shot clean through his beard, yet 'scaped hurt" [escaped being injured], wrote Archer. Percy also called Wingfield "a true, valiant gentleman".

The First Holy Communion at Jamestown, 22 June 1607 (as depicted in Old Heathfield Church, Sussex, England).

=== Strict ration control ===
President Wingfield built the great fort, sowed the first crops, imposed strict rationing – planned "for the long time until our harvest would be ripe" (wrote Wingfield), – and "every meal of fish or flesh should excuse [e.g. would cancel out] the allowance for porridge". He got in three weeks' reserve supplies through bartering for food with "the Naturals", while (as ordered by the Council in London) "not offending them". He had to impose a strict rationing: "half a pint of wheat and as much barley boiled with water for a man a day, having fried 26 weeks in the ships hold, contained as many worms as grains".

=== Worst drought for 800 years ===
In the oppressive heat, the diminishing food-stocks and American Indian attacks soon brought disease, death and dissension. President Wingfield and his settlers would not learn that their founding of Jamestown was during the worst seven-year dry spell (1606–1612) in nearly 800 years – which "dried up fresh-water supplies and devastated corn crops". Dr William Kelso and Beverly Straube of Jamestown Rediscovery are convinced that the colony's fate was "beyond the control of either settlers or their London backers". But the settlers were tough. The hardy ones survived that period and won through, establishing, as Dr. James Horn points out, "four fundamental characteristics of British America: representative government, private property, civilian control of the military, and a Protestant church"; along with English language and customs.

== Removed as president ==
A Discourse of Virginia (1607–1608)

On 10 September 1607, amid starvation and attacks from native tribes, Wingfield was arrested and deposed from his presidency. The now ex-President was arraigned on the following charges (just as in 1609 the 4th Governor/President Percy – with ex-President (the 2nd) Ratcliffe, Archer and Martin – was to send the ex-President Smith (the 3rd president) home to answer eight similar, more serious charges):

1. Calling Smith a liar.
2. Accusing Smith of concealing a mutiny plotted and confessed by Galthrop or Calthorpe, Gent.
3. Denying [John] Martin a spoonful of beer. Starving Martin's son to death.
4. Accusing Smith's old comrade-in-arms from Transylvania, "Jehu Robinson, Gentleman" and others of "consenting to run away with the shallop" to Newfoundland (as it was later called).
5. Starving the colony. [It was "suggested" that he had had food buried in the ground. Indeed he had, but this was then the normal way to keep food and drink (in casks or vats) from going bad in hot weather, and besides, it did stop rations from being stolen. The future Secretary, William Strachey was to write of such "underground storehouses", and indeed such food and drink storage methods were then in use in England and indeed were still in use in England and America until well into the 20th century.
6. "Banquet and riot, in that he did feed himself and his servants out to the common store."
  1. In Wingfield's time everyone was fed out of the common store, although there may have been separate Mess areas for the Council, the Gentlemen and labourers. Clearly, if this charge were true, it would have been made to stick. "Mr. Smith, in the time of our hunger", wrote Edward Maria, "had spread a rumour in the colony that I did feast my servants out of the common store, with intent, as I gathered, to have stirred the discontented company against me". No other writer of this period even implies that the President was requisitioning extra rations for himself or his servants. Wingfield started bartering with the Indians and/or stocked up with shot game, "for, as his store increased, he mended the common pot: he had laid up besides, provision for 3 weeks' wheat beforehand...I was all for one and one to all." Since Newport's return was a long way off, Edward Maria had imposed fair, very strict – and naturally very unpopular – rationing on the settlers.
7. "That I combined with the Spaniards to the destruction of the colony".
8. "That I am an atheist, because I carried not a bible, and because I forbid the preacher to preach". Why was President Wingfield accused of being an atheist? Because (a) he had no bible with him, (b) he cancelled two – or three – sermons, and (c) after he had been deposed, he failed to attend church on one or two occasions. [(a) His bible was stolen at Croft's house, just before they sailed from Blackwall. (b) When the men returned from standing to arms or counter-attacks, it was too late to have the sermon – and sermons were long in those days: so he cancelled them: "On two or three Sunday mornings, the Indians gave us alarums at our town", wrote Wingfield... "by that times they were answered, the place about us well discovered, and our divine service ended, the day was far spent." (c) And after his arrest (when he was sick and lame), he did not attend on a further one or two occasions when it was raining].
9. "That I affected a kingdom".
10. "That I did hide the common provision in the ground".

An additional "charge" is suggested by Smith's biographer, Philip L. Barbour: "that Wingfield was implicated in the planned escape in the pinnace to Spain (not England) by [George] Kendall". He wrote that Kendall began whispering about abandoning the colony – "perhaps with the connivance of Wingfield...and Wingfield seemed implicated" etc. His primary source presumably was Thomas Studley (or, rather, Smith – see note below), who in June 1608 wrote: "Wingfield and Kendall, living in disgrace... strengthened themselves with the sailors and confederates to regain their former credit and authority, or at least such means aboard the pinnace.. to alter her course, and to go for England... Smith...forced them to stay or sink in the river. Which action cost the life of Kendall [who was shot after trial]".

Smith further wrote: "The President" [Ratcliffe aka Sicklemore] and Captain Archer, not long after, intended also, to have abandoned the country.

Wingfield, however, was not charged with desertion – or he too would surely have been shot. It would seem that Smith got confused, accidentally or deliberately, over the dates of two or three different incidents. Indeed in 1608 Smith had also written: "Our store being now indifferently well provided with corn [e.g. maize] there was much ado for to have the pinnace go to England, against which Captain Martin and myself stood chiefly against it: and in fine after many debatings pro et contra, it was resolved to stay a further resolution." Some time after Kendall was shot, Wingfield came ashore from the pinnace and stated to Smith and Archer that: "I was determined to go to England to acquaint our Council of our weaknesses ... I said further, I desired not to go into England, if either Mr. President [Ratcliffe aka Sicklemore] would go."

The President by then was Ratcliffe. Barbour, who wrote of "John Smith's usual exaggeration", describes "the superlative pettiness" of the charges against Wingfield..."none of the accusations against him amounted to anything – not even Archer's assertion that he was in league with the Spaniards to destroy the colony." When the pragmatic Captain Newport, 47, arrived with the First Supply, he found young Smith, 27 – having been charged with losing two men to the Indians – also under restraint – for the second time; and he was, also for the second time since the expedition had set out, due to be hanged (on the morrow). Newport released Wingfield and Smith, waiving all but one of the charges against them both as petty, but he did not reinstate Wingfield, as the charge of being an atheist was so serious that he would have to be sent to England to be tried for it – just as Smith was to be later.

=== Attempted reinstatement ===
The disgruntled settlers now thought that the 2nd President, John Ratcliffe, was the source of all their problems, and Smith, Kendall and Percy planned to send James Read the blacksmith on a maintenance visit to the pinnace, where Wingfield was held, to see if Wingfield would agree to be reinstated, but Ratcliffe learned of these plans and had Read publicly thrashed.

=== Rebuttal of charges ===
In his Discourse of Virginia (1608), Wingfield comes across as a tough old soldier – too tough with the men, and too old for the job. He "could not make ropes of sand" as Stephen Vincent Benét described his situation

== Reputation and later career ==
=== Later involvement with the Virginia Company ===
Still involved with the Virginia Company at 70, he was still involved in the affairs of the colony a dozen years later, e.g. the Declaration of Supplies intended to be sent to Virginia in 1620, 22 June has: "Winckfield, Edward Maria, Captain, Esquire, Adventurer of the Virginia Company, London (Eng.): -L-88.". He died in 1631 and was buried at St. Andrew's, Kimbolton on 13 April 1631.

== In fiction and film ==
- played by Stephen Blackehart in First Landing (2007)
- played by David Thewlis in The New World (2005)
- played by Tony Goldwyn in Pocahontas: The Legend (1999)
- played by James Seay in Captain John Smith and Pocahontas (1953)
- Wingfield is the central character of the first chapter of Harry Turtledove's science fiction novel A Different Flesh, where Homo erectus and megafauna of the Pleistocene populated the New World instead of Native Americans.

== Notes on sources ==
A. Virginia Company Records. Since the Court (or Minute) Book for the Virginia Company for 28 January 1606 to 14 February 1615 disappeared after 1623(3) the only reliable (and likely incomplete) source is Alexander Brown's The Genesis of the United States [Vol. 2, 1899] – under the various family or individuals' names.

B. Wingfield's "A Discourse of Virginia" ("...upon the truth of this journal [I] do pledge my faith, and life...") is not drawn on as source material in four recent books on Jamestown [Lambeth Palace Library MS 250, ff.382r–392v; British Library 9602e 8, including an 1860 copy edited by Charles Deane with Introduction and Notes, 26 pages]. The first published version was only seen by a few people (through private subscription); and so the first time Wingfield's account was seen by a larger public – in New York and Glasgow – was not until 1905–1906, in Purchas, His Pilgrimes, vol. XVIII. (To convert the page numbers of Wingfield's Discourse to its page number in Jocelyn R. Wingfield's "Virginia's True Founder", add 298).

C. Wingfield's biography by Jocelyn R. Wingfield: Virginia's True Founder: Edward Maria Wingfield and His Times (1993), revised (2007), with an Introduction by Stephen Blackehart, 2007, ISBN 1-4196-6032-2. All page numbers referenced herein refer to the 1993 edition.

== Bibliography ==
- Andrews, Matthew Page (1943). The soul of a nation: the founding of Virginia and the projection of New England. New York: Scribner. OCLC 918296894.
- Smith, John (1910). "Introduction". In Arber, Edward (ed.). Travels and works of Captain John Smith, President of Virginia, and Admiral of New England 1580–1631. Edinburgh: Grant. OCLC 917675378.
- Archer, Gabriel (1860). "A Relatyon of the Discovery of our River". Archaeologia Americana. IV.
- Barbour, Philip L (1964). The three worlds of Captain John Smith. London: Macmillan. OCLC 3059055.
- Beverley, Robert (1722) [1705]. The History & Present State of Virginia. London: R. Parker.
- Blackham, Colonel Robert J (1930). The soul of the city, London's livery companies: their storied past, their living present. London: Sampson Low, Marston. OCLC 977021685.
- Bridges, J (1791). Northamptonshire.
- Brown, Alexander (1890). The Genesis of the United States; v 2. Boston: New York: Houghton, Mifflin. OCLC 56829327.
- Archer, Gabriel; Brereton, John (1984). Dexter, Lincoln A. (ed.). The Gosnold discoveries – in the north part of Virginia, 1602, now Cape Cod and the Islands, Massachusetts: according to the relations by Gabriel Archer and John Brereton, arranged in parallel for convenient comparison. Brookfield, Mass.: L.A. Dexter. ISBN 978-0960121083.
- Hamor, Ralph (1971) [1615]. A true discourse of the present estate of Virginia (Reprint ed.). Amsterdam: Theatrum Orbis Terrarum. ISBN 978-9022103203.
- Hasler, P.W., ed. (1981). The House of Commons 1558–1603. London: H.M.S.O. for the History of Parliament trust. ISBN 978-0118875011.
- Horn, James (2005). A land as God made it: Jamestown and the birth of America. New York: Basic Books. ISBN 978-0465030941.
- Kingsbury, Susan Myra, ed. (1993). The records of the Virginia Company of London. Bowie, Md.: Heritage Books. pp. 18, 22. ISBN 978-0788402531.
- Hume, Ivor Noël (1997). The Virginia adventure: Roanoke to James Towne: an archaeological and historical odyssey (1st ed.). Charlottesville: University Press of Virginia. ISBN 978-0813917580.
- Parks, George Bruner (1928). Richard Hakluyt and the English voyages. Special publication. Vol. 10. New York: American Geographical Society.
- Percy: see Purchas and Tyler.
- Porter, H.C. (1979). The inconstant savage: England and the North American Indian, 1500–1660. London: Duckworth. pp. 275–280. ISBN 978-0715609682.
- Price, David A. (2005). Love and hate in Jamestown: John Smith, Pocahontas, and the Start of a new nation. New York: Vintage Books. ISBN 978-1400031726.
- Purchas, Samuel (1905) [1625]. Purchas his pilgrimes: contayning a history of the world in sea voyages and lande travells by Englishmen and others. Glasgow: James MacLehose and Sons. OCLC 867865524. Purchas published a part of Percy's recollections
- Sheler, Jeffery L. (January 2005). "Rethinking Jamestown". The Smithsonian.
- Matthew, H. C. G., ed. (2004). "Wingfield, Edward Maria". Oxford dictionary of national biography: from the earliest times to the year 2000. Vol. 59 (1st ed.). Oxford: Oxford Univ. Press. ISBN 978-0198614098.
- Smith, John (1907) [1623]. The generall historie of Virginia, New England & the Summer Isles: together with the true travels, adventures and observations; and, A sea grammar. Glasgow: J. MacLehose and Sons. OCLC 317691690.
- Tyler, Lyon Gardiner, ed. (1907). Narratives of early Virginia, 1606–1625. New York: C. Scribner's Sons. OCLC 951040.
- Stratford, John (2000). From churchyard to castle: the history of Kimbolton School. Kimbolton: Kimbolton School. ISBN 978-0953775309.
- Wingfield, Edward Maria (1860) [1608]. "A Discourse of Virginia". Archaeologia Americana. IV: 67–103. hdl:2027/miun.afj9094.0001.001. [MS 250, ff.382r–392v, 1608 in Lambeth Palace Librar;, British Library 9602e 8, 26 pages.] This was not his diary since Smith and Archer destroyed that. See note on pg. 1].
- Wingfield, Jocelyn R. (2007). Virginia's true founder: Edward Maria Wingfield and his times, 1550–1631: the first biography of the first president of the first successful English colony in the New World (Rev. and updated Jamestown 400th anniversary ed.). North Carolina: Booksurge. ISBN 978-1-4196-6032-0.
- Woolley, Benjamin (2007). Savage kingdom: the true story of Jamestown, 1607, and the settlement of America (1st ed.). New York: HarperCollins Publishers. ISBN 978-0060090562.

Government offices
Preceded by none	Colonial Governor of Virginia; 1607	Succeeded by John Ratcliffe
