= Bridget Wiltshire =

English courtier

Bridget Wiltshire (later: Wingfield, then Hervey, then Tyrwhitt; died January 1534) was an English courtier. She was the neighbour, close friend and lady-in-waiting to Anne Boleyn, the second wife of King Henry VIII. She was the wife of Sir Richard Wingfield (widower of Catherine Woodville) and the daughter of Sir John Wiltshire of Stone Castle, Kent, a neighbour of the Boleyn family. After the death of her first husband, she married Sir Nicholas Hervey, her second husband, whom she was married to for about seven years. Her third husband was Sir Robert Tyrwhit.

== Life ==
Bridget was born on an unknown date, the daughter of Sir John Wiltshire, and Margaret Graunt (daughter of Simon le Grand and Catherine Percy), of Stone Castle, in Shurland, Kent,

She became a member of Catherine of Aragon's household, sometime before 1520, as Bridget was present at the Field of the Cloth of Gold in France. After Anne Boleyn became queen in 1533, Bridget Wiltshire was appointed to be her Lady of the Bedchamber.

A letter written by Anne Boleyn to Bridget was used as evidence in the trial of the Queen for adultery and conspiring against the life of the King. As Bridget had died, she could not refute the interpretation the prosecution placed on the Queen's words. And note that this matter was disclosed by a woman called Lady Wingfield who was a servant of the said queen and shared the same tendencies. And suddenly the said Wingfield became ill and a little time before her death she showed the matter to one of those etc.

"I pray you as you love me, to give credence to my servant this bearer, touching your removing and any thing else that he shall tell you on my behalf; for I will desire you to do nothing but that shall be for your wealth. And, madam, though at all time I have not showed the love that I bear you as much as it was in deed, yet now I trust that you shall well prove that I loved you a great deal more than I fair for. And assuredly, next mine own mother I know no woman alive that I love better, and at length, with God's grace, you shall prove that it is unfeigned. And I trust you do know me for such a one that I will write nothing to comfort you in your trouble but I will abide by it as long as I live. And therefore I pray you leave your indiscreet trouble, both for displeasing of God and also for displeasing of me, that doth love you so entirely. And trusting in God that you will thus do, I make an end. With the ill hand of
Your own assured friend during my life.", Anne Rochford

The letter would have been written after 1525 when Boleyn's father became Viscount Rochford (as Anne signs herself as Anne Rochford) and after the death of Bridget's first husband, Richard Wingfield. As Anne remonstrates with Bridget, it's entirely possible that the letter was written before Bridget's marriage to her third husband, whom Boleyn didn't approve of.

=== Family ===
In 1513, she married her first husband, Sir Richard Wingfield, courtier, diplomat, and Lord Deputy of Calais. He was one of twelve brothers and the widower of Catherine Woodville, a younger sister of Edward IV's queen consort Elizabeth Woodville. Together, Sir Richard and Bridget had ten children:

- Charles Wingfield (1513- 24 May 1540), married Joan Knollys, sister of Sir Francis Knollys, and sister-in-law of Catherine Carey, who was the niece of Anne Boleyn. Together, Charles and Joan had four children.
- Thomas Wingfield, Member of Parliament, married firstly Margaret Sabyn; he married secondly Margaret Kerrye, by whom he had issue, including celebrated Virginia colonist, Edward Maria Wingfield.
- Jacques Wingfield (1519- 1587), a politician in the service of Bishop Stephen Gardiner.
- Henry Wingfield
- Jane Wingfield, married firstly Thomas Worlich, by whom she had issue, and secondly Francis Roe.
- Mary Wingfield
- Margaret Wingfield, married firstly Sir Thomas Newman, and secondly a son of the Moyle family.
- Anne Wingfield, married into the Maidenhead family.
- Elizabeth Wingfield, married into the Latimer family.
- Catherine Wingfield

Sir Richard died in 1525, and she married secondly, a courtier, Sir Nicholas Hervey of Ickworth, Ambassador to Emperor Charles V, but a loyal supporter of Anne Boleyn. Bridget and Sir Nicholas had six children, George Hervey, Cecily Hervey, Bridget Hervey, Isabella Hervey, Eleanor Hervey and William Hervey.

After the death of Sir Nicholas on 5 August 1532, Bridget married her third husband, Sir Robert Tyrwhitt, a man of whom Anne Boleyn did not approve. The two quarreled possibly on account of the latter's disapproval. Bridget is last mentioned in the list of New Years' Gifts in 1534, however, as there were many Lady Wingfields it is hard to be sure who was being referred to. She died after giving birth to Joan and Arthur Tyrwhitt by her third husband.
