= Thrapston Midland Road railway station =

Former railway station in Northamptonshire, England

Coordinates: 52.3898°N 0.5379°W

Thrapston Midland Road

General information
- Location: Thrapston, North Northamptonshire; England
- Platforms: 2

Other information
- Status: Disused

History
- Original company: Kettering, Thrapston & Huntingdon Railway
- Pre-grouping: Midland Railway
- Post-grouping: London, Midland and Scottish Railway; London Midland Region of British Railways

Key dates
- 1 March 1866: Station opened as Thrapstone
- 1 October 1885: Renamed Thrapston
- 2 June 1924: Renamed Thrapston Midland Road
- 15 June 1959: Station closed to passengers
- 28 October 1963: Station closed to goods. The opening titles of British sitcom; Oh, Doctor Beeching, feature the same design of locomotive.
Location

Thrapston Midland Road railway station is a former railway station on the Kettering, Thrapston and Huntingdon Railway line from Kettering. The station officially closed to Passengers on 15 June 1959. However the actual last passengers left the platform on the 8.30pm from Kettering on the evening of 13 June 1959. The train was hauled by steam locomotive and tender 46467 a Class 2 Ivatt LMS Mogul 2-6-0.

Thrapston Station Quarry, formerly called Thrapston Midland Railway Station Quarry, is a geological Site of Special Scientific Interest.

A sound recording of the last passenger train to leave Thrapston Midland Road Station in 1959

Preceding station	Disused railways	Following station
Twywell	Midland Railway; Kettering to Huntingdon Line	Raunds

== See also ==
- List of closed railway stations in Britain
