= Richard Wingfield (disambiguation) =

Sir Richard Wingfield (c. 1456–1525) was an English courtier and diplomat

Richard Wingfield may also refer to:

- Richard Wingfield, 1st Viscount Powerscourt (first creation) (c. 1551–1634), English nobleman
- Richard Wingfield, 1st Viscount Powerscourt (third creation) (1697–1751), MP for Boyle
- Richard Wingfield, 3rd Viscount Powerscourt (1730–1788), Anglo-Irish politician and peer
- Richard Wingfield, 5th Viscount Powerscourt (1790–1823), Viscount Powerscourt
- Richard Wingfield, 6th Viscount Powerscourt (1815–1844), British peer and Conservative Party politician
- Richard Wingfield (MP for Orford) (died c. 1591), Member of Parliament (MP) for Orford
- Richard Wingfield (MP for Portsmouth) (c. 1510-1557/59), MP for Portsmouth

== See also ==
- Richard Wingfield-Baker (1802–1880), MP for South Essex
