= Kimbolton, Cambridgeshire =

Town in Huntingdonshire, England

Coordinates: 52.3°N 0.38°W

Kimbolton
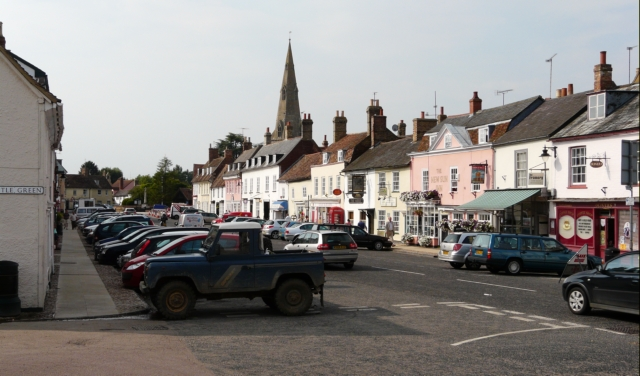
- High Street

- Location within Cambridgeshire
- Population: 1,477 (Including Stonely) (2011 census)
- OS grid reference: TL102681
- Civil parish: Kimbolton and Stonely
- District: Huntingdonshire
- Shire county: Cambridgeshire
- Region: East
- Country: England
- Sovereign state: United Kingdom
- Post town: HUNTINGDON
- Postcode district: PE28
- Dialling code: 01480
- Police: Cambridgeshire
- Fire: Cambridgeshire
- Ambulance: East of England
- UK Parliament: Huntingdon

Kimbolton (/ˈkɪm.boʊl.tən/; kim-BOWL-tən) is a town and civil parish in the Huntingdonshire district of Cambridgeshire, England. Kimbolton is about 9 miles (14 km) west of Huntingdon and 14 miles (23 km) north of Bedford.

Kimbolton was also situated within historic Huntingdonshire when it was a county of England. The parish includes the hamlet of Stonely. Catherine of Aragon, after her divorce from Henry VIII, died at Kimbolton Castle in 1536.

== History ==
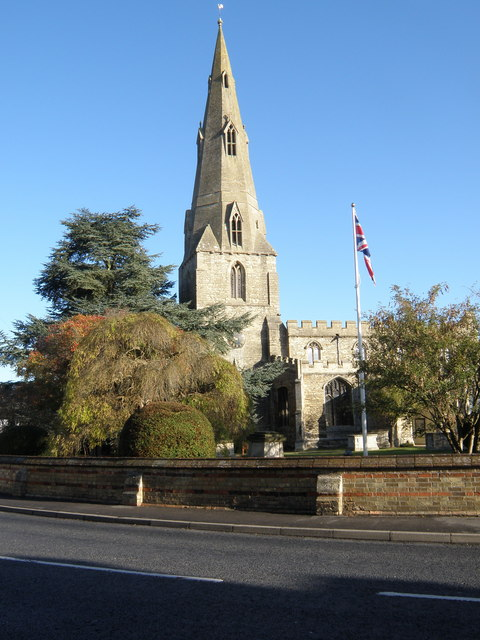
St Andrew's Church, Kimbolton

Archaeological discoveries near to the airfield indicate the possible presence of a Roman settlement. The name Kimbolton, however, is Anglo-Saxon, translating as “Cenebald’s ton” (an enclosure or homestead).

Kimbolton, and the lands of its soke, comprised the only estate of King Harold in Huntingdonshire. It is believed that Harold had a hunting lodge nearby. The town was listed as Chenebaltone and Kenebaltone in the Domesday Book of 1086 in the Hundred of Leightonstone in Huntingdonshire. The survey records that there were 20 ploughlands at Kimbolton in 1086 and, in addition to the arable land, there were 70 acres (28 hectares) of meadows, 3,784 acres (1,531 hectares) of woodland and a water mill. There was already a church and a priest at Kimbolton.

The parish church of St Andrew is Grade I listed. Many members of the Montagu family (Earls and Dukes of Manchester of Kimbolton) are buried at St Andrew's. Several Montagu monuments still exist in the South Chapel, while the Montagu vault (extended in 1853) is located beneath the North Chapel.

The main road through Kimbolton bends through four tight right angles in quick succession. Originally, the road travelled directly through the outskirts of the town, nearer to the River Kym to the north.

The parish also includes the hamlet of Stonely, site of the former Augustinian Stoneley Priory.

=== Castle ===
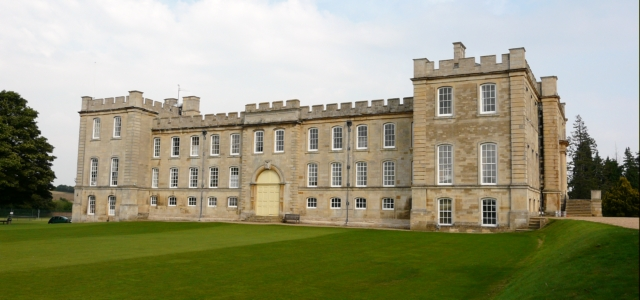
Kimbolton Castle

In the centre of the town is Kimbolton Castle which now forms the main building of Kimbolton School (an independent day and boarding secondary school), but its predecessor on the same site was once home and prison to Catherine of Aragon after her divorce from Henry VIII. Catherine died at Kimbolton Castle in 1536 and was transported from there to Peterborough Cathedral to be buried.

== Governance ==
Kimbolton was in the historic and administrative county of Huntingdonshire until 1965. From 1965, the town was part of the new administrative county of Huntingdon and Peterborough. Then in 1974, following the Local Government Act 1972, Kimbolton became a part of the administrative county of Cambridgeshire.

For Kimbolton the highest tier of local government is Cambridgeshire County Council. Kimbolton is part of the electoral division of Brampton and Kimbolton and is represented on the county council by one councillor. The second tier of local government is Huntingdonshire District Council, a non-metropolitan district of Cambridgeshire. Kimbolton is a part of the district ward of Kimbolton and Staughton and is represented on the district council by one councillor. District councillors serve for four-year terms following elections to Huntingdonshire District Council. As a civil parish, Kimbolton has a parish council.

At Westminster, Kimbolton is in the parliamentary constituency of Huntingdon, and since 2024 has been represented in the House of Commons by Ben Obese-Jecty (Conservative).

== Demography ==
=== Population ===
In the period 1801 to 1901 the population of Kimbolton was recorded every ten years by the UK census. During this time the population was in the range of 915 (the lowest was in 1901) and 1661 (the highest was in 1861).

From 1901, a census was taken every ten years with the exception of 1941 (due to the Second World War).

Parish	1911	1921	1931	1951	1961	1971	1981	1991	2001	2011
Kimbolton	913	902	699	845	824	1,136	858	1,315	1,432	1,477
All population census figures from report Historic Census figures Cambridgeshire to 2011 by Cambridgeshire Insight.

In 2011, the parish covered an area of 4,964 acres (2,009 hectares) and so the population density for Kimbolton in 2011 was 190.4 persons per square mile (73.5 per square kilometre).

In 2011 there are around 1,100 people living in the town's built-up area, which excludes Stonely.

== Statute Fair and market ==
=== Origin ===
The Statute Fair, referred to affectionately by locals as the "Statty Fair" or simply the "Statty", is a fair held every September and has been characterised by one local historian as "Dodgems, darts, candy floss and cuddly toys". The Kimbolton Statute Fair shares a wider history and heritage with similar statute fairs across England, dating back to the 1351 Statute of Labourers.

In 1200, a prominent local landowner, Geoffrey Fitz Peter, Earl of Essex and Chief Justice to King John, who constructed the first castle on the present site, received a Royal charter to hold a fair in Kimbolton on St Andrew's Eve (and the two days hence), as well as a weekly market on Fridays. During the medieval period there were as many as five fairs in Kimbolton, with a "Tandry Fair" being held in the town for the sale of "cattle and hogs" until the 19th century.

During the medieval period a market cross was set up, around which market traders gathered to sell their goods - the foundations of which survive under the High Street. A plaque commemorating the cross exists near the war memorial. In 1603 the market cross was replaced with a wooden market hall - similar to the one at Ledbury - known as "Butchers' Row", which survived until the 1870s, when it was demolished; by the 1890s the market has declined to the point where it had "effectively disappeared".

By the end of the Victorian period, alongside Kimbolton's declining population, only the Statute Fair remained of the numerous fairs. By no later than 1881 the fair's purpose had changed from the traditional hiring fair to a recreational fete. One account from the Rev. Robert Kater Vinter in the 1881 Kimbolton School magazine described the "wretched mixture" of revellers travelling from neighbouring villages to drink, smoke and partake in all the fun of the fair - including a coconut shy, wooden carousel and an exhibition booth featuring real life Zulus. A later account from William Abington (born 1903) recalled further attractions including hoopla, toffee and rock stalls, swinging boats, a joke toy stall and a tent that boasted the "fattest women in the world".

=== Present day ===
In the present day the Statute Fair continues and is widely attended by students from the local school as well as those from other nearby schools and adults. It takes place on the High Street for one evening each September (unlike the three days granted by King John), and as such the High Street is closed for a 48-hour period, with traffic being redirected down St Andrew's Lane and East Street. Modern attractions at the fair include bumper cars, a funhouse, inflatables and waltzers as well as fairground games, including the staple coconut shy; attendance is reported to be in the hundreds.

The continuation of the fair (despite the chaos which formerly ensued when this meant partial closure of a trunk road) and the plaque marking the site of the former market cross are claimed by some as evidence that Kimbolton is a town, as opposed to a village, and still has the right to hold a weekly market. The main road was diverted to its present course to take it through the market place and increase toll revenue. Eight hundred years later, as a result of numerous vehicles striking walls and houses near the sharp bends, car transporters are not allowed in the town.

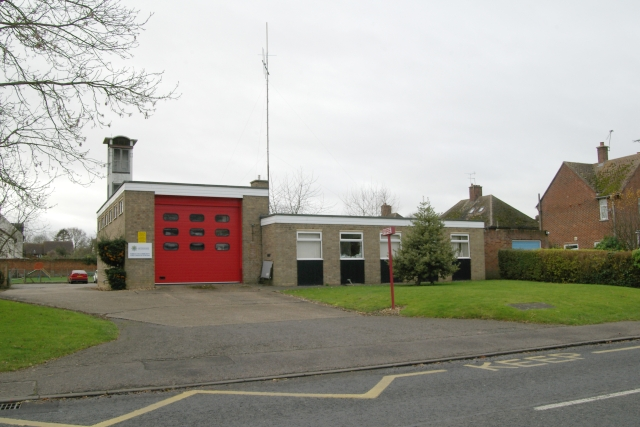
Kimbolton fire station

In 2020, the COVID-19 Pandemic limited the scale of the fair, even risking the fair not running for the first time in many years, far beyond living memory. One 'teacups' ride was placed at the castle end of the high street to ensure the tradition would not cease.

== Facilities ==
Kimbolton is known locally for its facilities, including High Street shopping, two public houses, a Budgens outlet (formerly Robinsons fuel station), fire station, a Post Office, a medical centre, a pharmacy, two cafe shops (Olivers and Crawfords), Whitchurch Wines and the Mandeville Hall, a charitable organisation providing facilities to the local community.

== Media ==
Local news and television programmes are provided by BBC East and ITV Anglia. Television signals are received from the Sandy Heath TV transmitter. Local radio stations are BBC Radio Cambridgeshire, Heart East, Greatest Hits Radio East, Star Radio and HCR FM, a community based radio station. The Hunts Post is the town's local weekly newspaper.

== Kimbolton railway station ==
The Kimbolton railway station was situated over two miles from the centre. It served the Midland Railway Kettering to Huntingdon Line. If travelling from London St. Pancras the journey would take approximately three hours, including a change at Kettering. The station and its line closed in 1959.

== Kimbolton Airfield ==
In World War II, the USAAF 379th Bombardment Group was stationed at the nearby Kimbolton Airfield from May 1943 to June 1945. Part of the airfield is now used by Hunts Kart Racing Club. As of 2019, there is free and unsupervised access to the airfield for walkers. Remnants of old wartime bunkers are apparent across sections of the airfield.

== Kimbolton Fireworks ==
Kimbolton Fireworks, a well-known manufacturer of fireworks and organiser of public fireworks displays, is based in Kimbolton. It grew from the extracurricular activities of Kimbolton School chaplain and chemistry master, Ron Lancaster, sometimes dubbed the "master blaster pastor." In 2020, the popular firework display was cancelled due to the COVID-19 pandemic.
