= Kettering, Thrapston and Huntingdon Railway =

The Kettering, Thrapston and Huntingdon Railway was an English railway line opened throughout in 1866. It connected the Midland Railway main line at Kettering to ironstone deposits to the south-east of the town, as well as opening up the agricultural district around Thrapston and reaching the regional centre of Huntingdon. The hoped-for expansion of agricultural was limited and local traffic did not develop; at the same time the difficult alignment and gradients of the line discouraged heavy use as a through line. A basic passenger service operated through from Kettering to Cambridge, by using running powers east of Huntingdon via St Ives.

Although some munitions traffic during World War II enhanced the value of the line temporarily, it declined steeply after 1945 and passenger services were withdrawn in 1959. When the iron ore workings diminished too, the line was cut back in 1963 to serve only the remaining Twywell site. That activity too finished in 1971, resulting in total closure.

== First railways ==
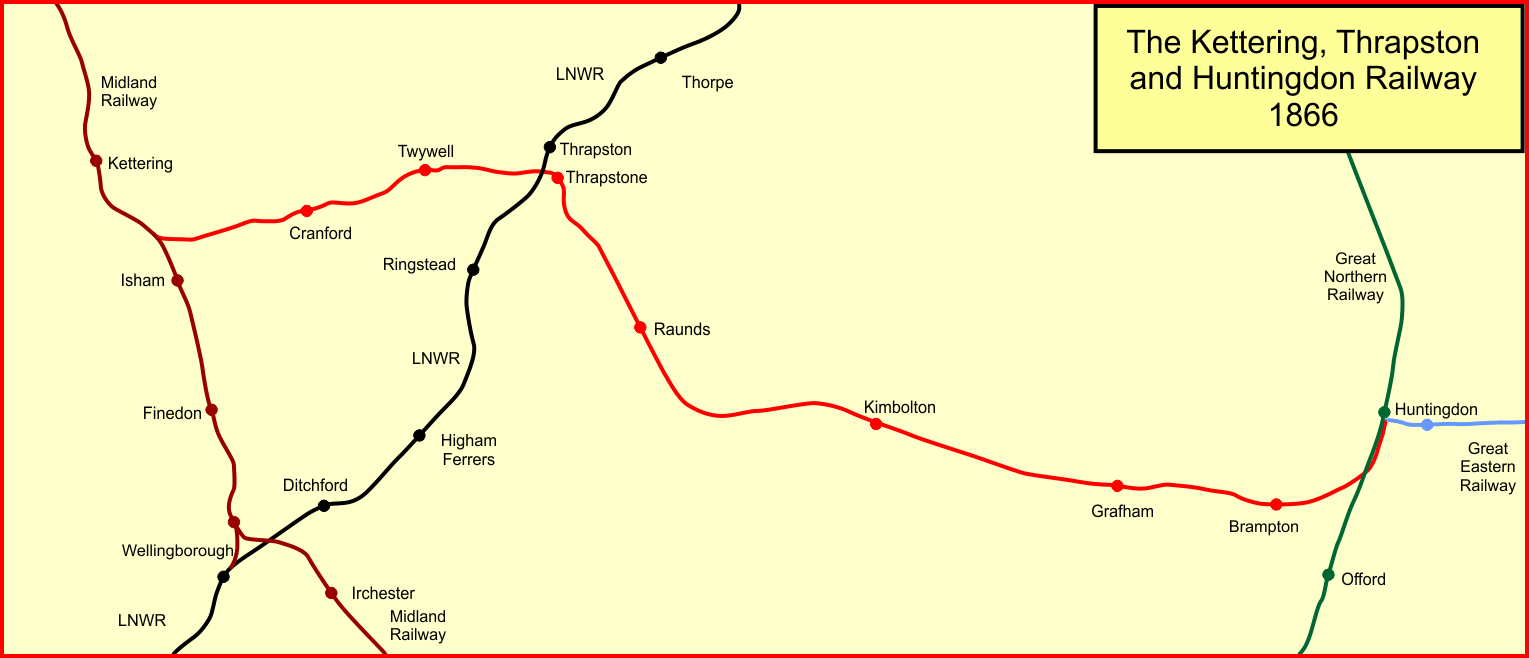
The Kettering, Thrapston and Huntingdon Railway

The route of the Great Northern Railway (GNR) between London and Peterborough via Huntingdon was completed in 1850. Later part of the Midland Railway main line came into use in 1857, between Hitchin and Leicester. For the time being the Midland Railway trains used the GNR's King's Cross station in London. Huntingdon had been approached from the east by the Lynn and Ely Railway, which projected an extension of its line from Ely to St Ives, and this was opened on 17 August 1847. It was worked at first by the Eastern Counties Railway; in 1862, the Great Eastern Railway took over.

Kettering and Thrapstone Railway Act 1862
- Act of Parliament
- Parliament of the United Kingdom
- Long title: An Act for making a Railway from Kettering to Thrapstone in the County of Northampton; and for other Purposes.
- Citation: 25 & 26 Vict. c. clxxiii

Dates
- Royal assent: 29 July 1862

Text of statute as originally enacted

During the construction of the Midland Railway line it was evident that there were commercially valuable ironstone deposits in the area around Kettering. An earlier scheme to connect them had failed, but in 1860 a definite proposal was formulated to reach them and to continue to Huntingdon on the Great Northern line. The first part was authorised as the Kettering and Thrapstone [sic] Railway, which received its authorising act of Parliament, the Kettering and Thrapstone Railway Act 1862 (25 & 26 Vict. c. clxxiii) on 29 July 1862; the parliamentary process was more easy than was often the case at this period. The line was to terminate at Thrapston adjacent to the London and North Western Railway station on the western edge of the town.

A newspaper reported:

Kettering and Thrapston Railway Bill: This bill has just received the Royal assent, and we understand the works are to be commenced immediately. There are extensive quarries of iron stone of a fine quality, and also beds of white clay, which will be worked in the vicinity, and for which there is a great and increasing demand. A bill will be brought in in the next session of Parliament to extend the powers of the act to Huntingdon, so as to connect the Eastern Counties with the Midland line.

— Leicester Mercury

== Extending to Huntingdon ==
Kettering, Thrapstone and Huntingdon Railway Act 1863
- Act of Parliament
- Parliament of the United Kingdom
- Long title: An Act to enable the Kettering and Thrapstone Railway Company to extend their authorized Line of Railway to Huntingdon, with a Branch Railway at Huntingdon; to change their Name; to authorize them to use certain Stations and Portions of Railway of the Great Eastern Railway Company and the Great Northern Railway Company; and to make Traffic Arrangements with the Midland Railway Company and the Great Northern Railway Company; and for other Purposes.
- Citation: 26 & 27 Vict. c. cciii

Dates
- Royal assent: 28 July 1863

Text of statute as originally enacted

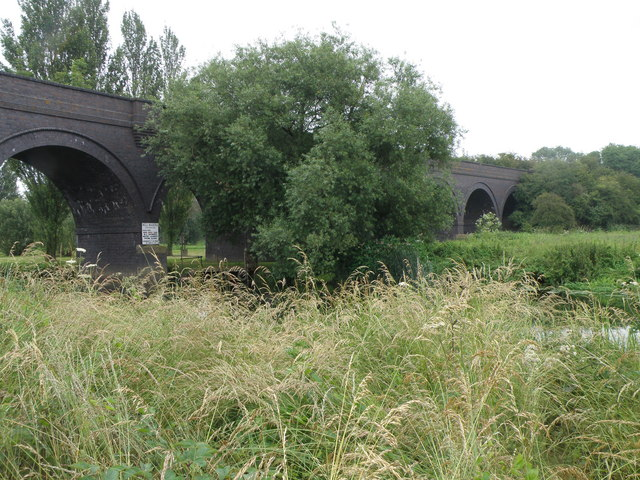
Thrapston railway viaduct, still extant (2018); it replaced an earlier timber structure

As the newspaper indicated, plans were afoot for the Huntingdon extension, and again the bill met little opposition: it was authorised by the Kettering, Thrapstone and Huntingdon Railway Act 1863 (26 & 27 Vict. c. cciii) on 28 July 1863, and the company was renamed the Kettering, Thrapstone and Huntingdon Railway. The Midland Railway was authorised to work the line for 40% of the gross receipts for the first seven years, and at 50% thereafter. The engineer was James Brunlees.

The Board of Trade inspector approved the line between Kettering and Huntingdon on 15 February 1866, and the first goods train ran on 21 February 1866, followed by passenger trains from 1 March 1866. It was worked by the Midland Railway from the outset, and there were running powers over the Great Eastern Railway from Huntingdon to Cambridge via St Ives.

The line had sharp curves and difficult gradients, and running through sparsely populated terrain, many of the stations were not well situated for the communities they were intended to serve.

The Cambridge newspaper reported:

The Huntingdon, Thrapston, and Kettering Railway: This railway was opened Thursday, the 1st inst., [1 March 1866] for passenger traffic, the Midland Company running four trains each way between Cambridge and Kettering, and two each way on Sundays. The distance between Kettering and Cambridge is 47 3/4 miles, and between the former place and Huntingdon 28 1/4 miles. The stations between Kettering and Huntingdon are Brampton, Grafham, Kimbolton, Raunds, Thrapston, Twywell, and Crawford. The journey to Cambridge is done by the Midland trains running over the Great Eastern from Huntingdon. The goods traffic commenced last week. This line will now offer facilities for communication with the Midland and North-Western Railways.

— Cambridge Independent Press

== In operation ==
There were never more than four passenger trains daily running throughout on the line, although there were some short working to Thrapston, and on summer Saturdays in the 1950s a through Leicester to Clacton-on-Sea service operated.

The company was vested by the Midland Railway Act 1897 (60 & 61 Vict. c. clxxxiii) in the Midland Railway on 6 August 1897.

After the 1923 Grouping, the London, Midland and Scottish Railway (LMS) took control of the line; the London and North Eastern Railway (LNER) controlled the main line at Huntingdon and eastwards. Soon the ironstone at the western end of the line became exhausted, and this, together with the increase in motor transport, caused a decline in the line's importance.

There was a possibility of the line closing in the late 1930s but the demands of wartime transport during World War II kept the line in operation; a United States Air Force base was established at Stow Longa, which resulted in increased munitions traffic for the time being.

Twywell closed in 1951 and Cranford five years later. A business study was carried out on the route between Kettering and Huntingdon in 1958; it showed considerable losses, and the result was that the passenger service was withdrawn after 15 June 1959. At the same time the line west of Kimbolton was closed completely. This was further cut back from 18 October 1963 when only the line from Kettering to Twywell remained open; there were extensive iron workings at Twywell.

At the Kettering end of the line, crew-training was undertaken in August 1962. After the severe winter of 1962-63, a bridge near Raunds collapsed, and it was announced that all traffic would cease from 28 October 1963, except the Twywell ore trains. These continued until 27 July 1971.

There is now no railway activity on the former line.

== Location list ==
- Kettering Junction;
- Butlin's siding;
- Cranford Siding West;
- Cranford; opened 1 March 1866; closed 2 April 1956;
- Cranford Siding East;
- Twywell; opened 1 March 1866; closed 30 July 1951;
- Islip iron works;
- Thrapston; opened 1 March 1866; renamed Thrapston October 1885; renamed Thrapston Midland Road 1924; closed 15 June 1959;
- Raunds; opened 1 March 1866; closed 15 June 1959;
- Kimbolton; opened 1 March 1866; closed 15 June 1959;
- Longstow goods;
- Graffham; opened 1 March 1866; renamed Grafham 1877; closed 15 June 1959;
- Brampton; opened 1 March 1866; renamed Buckden 1868; closed 15 June 1959;
- Huntingdon North (GNR station) and Huntingdon East (GER station).
