= Twywell railway station =

Disused railway station in Twywell, Northamptonshire

Coordinates: 52.3918°N 0.5931°W

Twywell

General information
- Location: Twywell, Northamptonshire; England
- Platforms: 1

Other information
- Status: Disused

History
- Original company: Kettering, Thrapston and Huntingdon Railway
- Pre-grouping: Midland Railway
- Post-grouping: London, Midland and Scottish Railway; British Railways (London Midland Region)

Key dates
- 1 March 1866: Opened
- 30 July 1951: Closed
Location

Twywell railway station served the village of Twywell, Northamptonshire, England, from 1866 to 1951 on the Kettering, Thrapston and Huntingdon Railway.

== History ==
The station was opened on 1 March 1866 by the Kettering, Thrapston and Huntingdon Railway. It closed on 30 July 1951.

Preceding station	Disused railways	Following station
Cranford; Line and station closed	Kettering, Thrapston and Huntingdon Railway	Thrapston; Line and station closed
