= Thrapston Station Quarry =

Quarry in Northamptonshire, England

Coordinates: 52.388°N 0.533°W

- Site of Special Scientific Interest
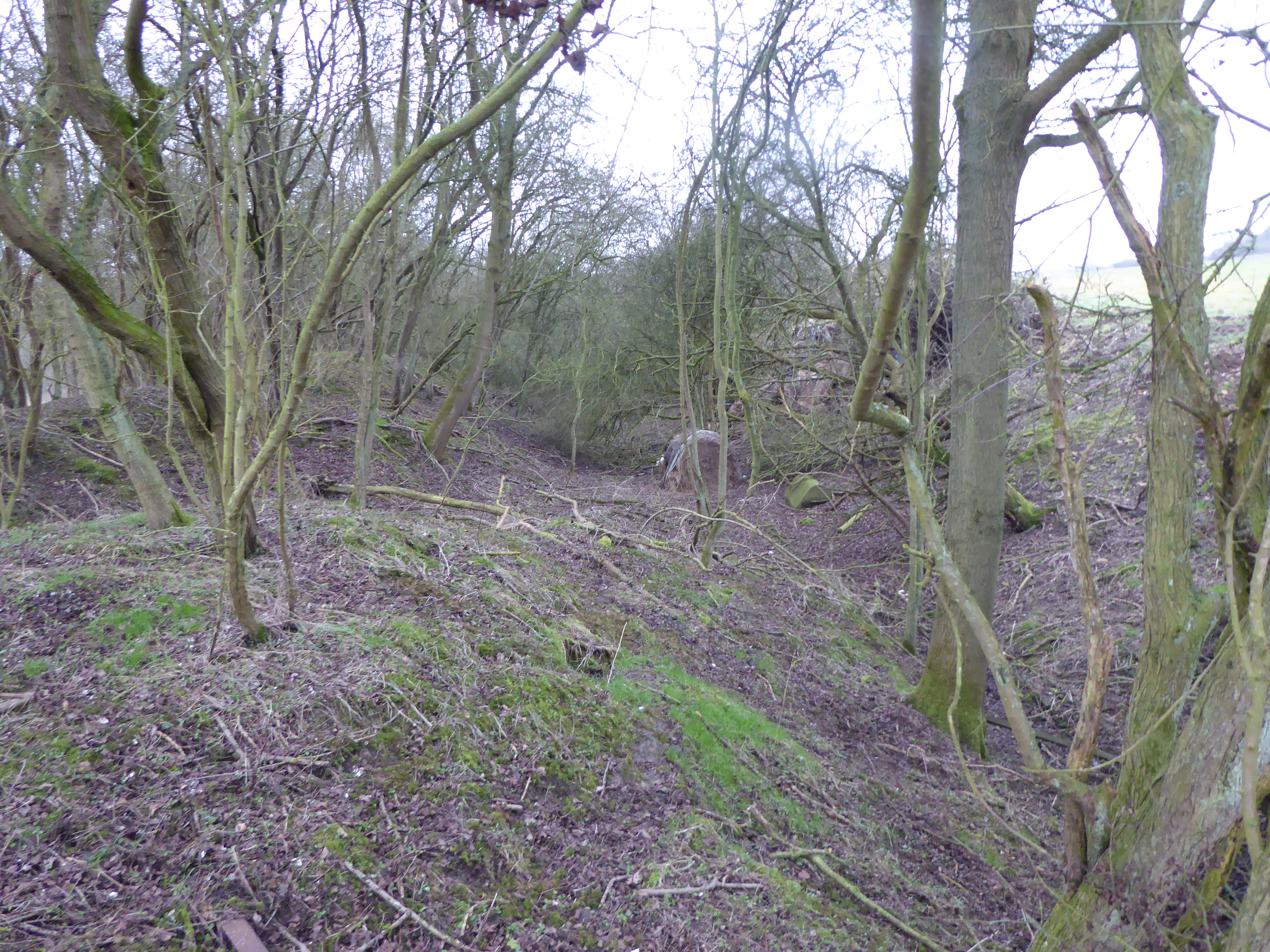
- Location of Thrapston Station Quarry.
- Area of search: Northamptonshire
- Grid reference: SP 999 776
- Interest: Geological
- Area: 4.5 hectares
- Notification date: 1986
- Location map: Magic Map

Thrapston Station Quarry is a 4.5-hectare (11-acre) geological Site of Special Scientific Interest south of Thrapston in Northamptonshire. It is a Geological Conservation Review site. It was formerly called the Thrapston Midland Railway Station Quarry.

This site has the most important remaining Middle Jurassic Cornbrash geological section in the Midlands. It is the type site for the Bathonian Blisworth Clay section, dating to 168 to 166 million years ago, and it has the only complete exposure of this section. Diagnostic ammonites have helped to date the site, which has also yielded important Bryozoan fossils.

The site is on private land with no public access.
