= Kimbolton railway station =

Former railway station in Cambridgeshire, England

Coordinates: 52.3271°N 0.4053°W

Kimbolton

General information
- Location: Kimbolton, Huntingdonshire; England

Other information
- Status: Disused

History
- Original company: Midland Railway
- Pre-grouping: Midland Railway
- Post-grouping: London, Midland and Scottish Railway

Key dates
- 1 Mar 1866: Opened
- 15 Jun 1959: Closed
Location

Kimbolton railway station was a railway station in Kimbolton, Cambridgeshire. The station and its line closed in 1959.

The journey from London St. Pancras took approximately three hours, and required a change of trains and a wait at Kettering. This journey was described by former Kimbolton School headmaster William Ingram as "long and wearisome", especially considering that the station was more than two miles away from the village centre.

Preceding station	Disused railways	Following station
Raunds	Midland Railway; Kettering to Huntingdon Line	Grafham
