= Raunds railway station =

Former railway station in Northamptonshire, England

Coordinates: 52.3515°N 0.5037°W

Raunds
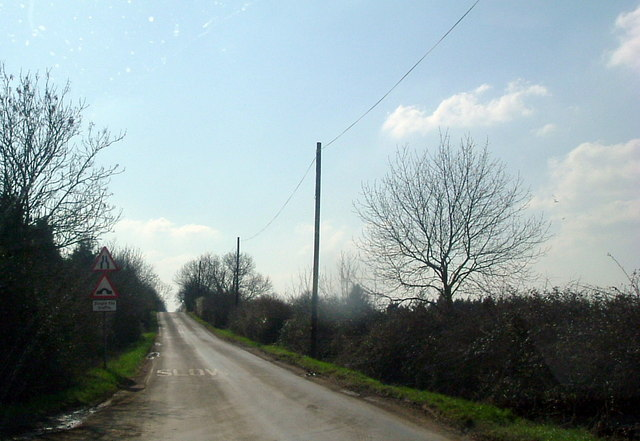
- The site of the station in 2007

General information
- Location: Raunds, North Northamptonshire; England

Other information
- Status: Disused

History
- Original company: Midland Railway
- Post-grouping: London, Midland and Scottish Railway

Key dates
- 1 March 1866: Opened
- 15 June 1959: Closed to passengers
Location

Raunds railway station is a railway station that once served the town of Raunds in Northamptonshire, England. The railway station was an intermediate stop on the Kettering, Thrapston and Huntingdon Railway line that closed in 1959.

The railway station was fairly inconveniently situated 1 3/4 miles (2.8 km) from the town itself. At one time there were plans to extend the Wellingborough – Higham Ferrers branch to Raunds, but the plan was blocked by land owners.

The Manchester, Sheffield & Lincolnshire Railway (the forerunner of the Great Central Railway) proposed a line from Doncaster to Raunds in an early version of its bid to build a trunk line to the capital. This line never came to fruition, and the company eventually built its London Extension via Nottingham, Leicester, Rugby and Brackley.

== See also ==
- List of closed railway stations in Britain

Preceding station	Disused railways	Following station
Thrapston Midland Road	Midland Railway; Kettering to Huntingdon Line	Kimbolton
