= Grafham railway station =

Former railway station in Cambridgeshire, England

Coordinates: 52.3103°N 0.2978°W

Grafham
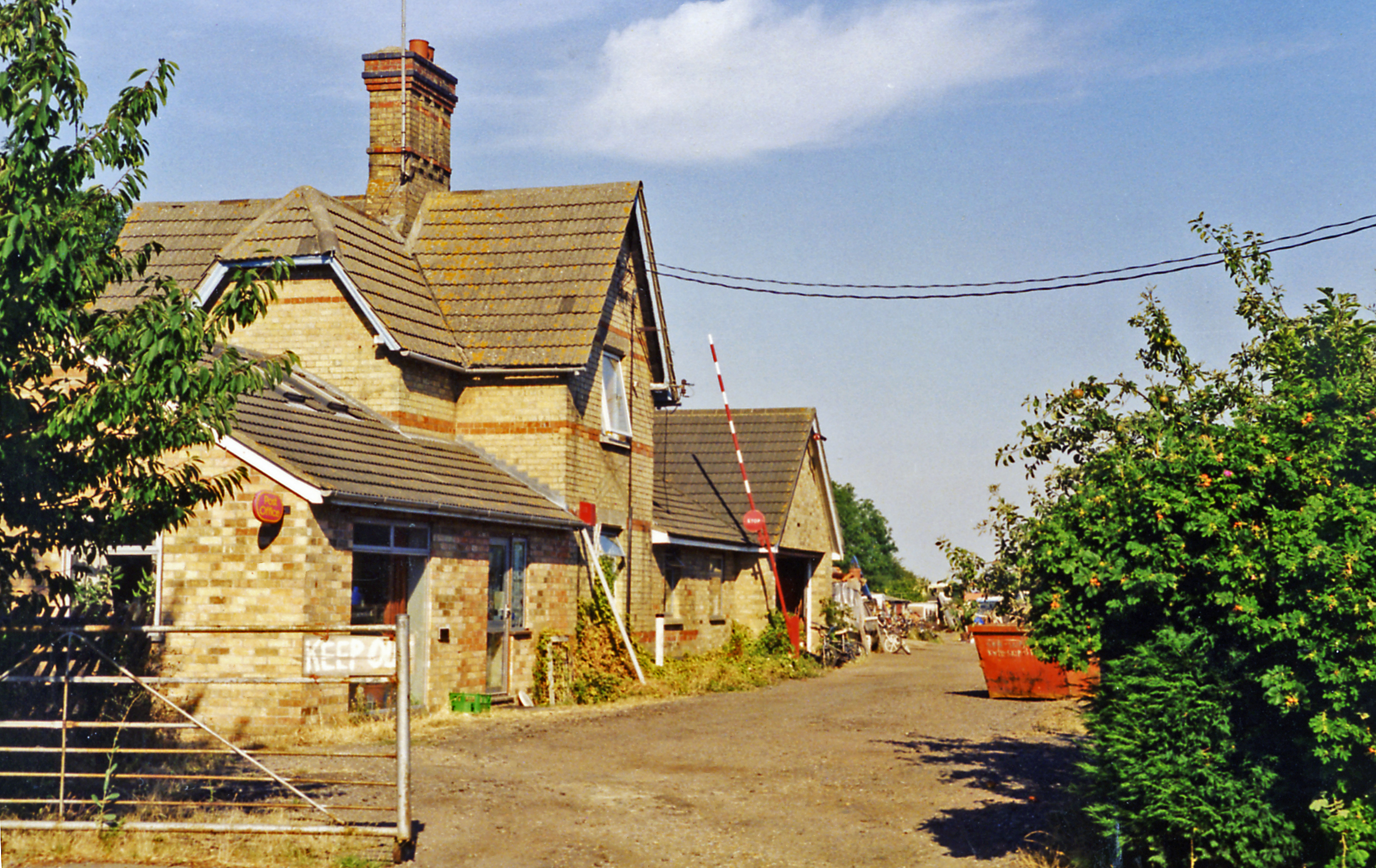
- View in 1995

General information
- Location: Grafham, Cambridgeshire England
- Grid reference: TL161694
- Platforms: 1

Other information
- Status: Disused

History
- Original company: Kettering, Thrapston and Huntingdon Railway
- Pre-grouping: Midland Railway
- Post-grouping: London, Midland and Scottish Railway

Key dates
- 1 March 1866: Opened as Graffham
- 1 February 1877: Renamed Grafham
- 15 June 1959: Closed
Location

Grafham railway station was a railway station in Grafham, Cambridgeshire. The station and its line closed in 1959.

In the 1990s the railway station buildings still stood and were lived in. The area around the old platform (known in the village as 'the scrapyard') had been used to dispose of old machinery and other debris as can be seen in the background of the view in 1995. The platform itself was still clearly visible. Since then the site was cleared, buildings demolished, and a row of new houses built on the land.

| Preceding station | Disused railways | Following station |
|---|---|---|
| Kimbolton | Midland Railway; Kettering to Huntingdon Line | Buckden |
