= Cranford railway station =

Disused railway station in Cranford, Northamptonshire

Cranford
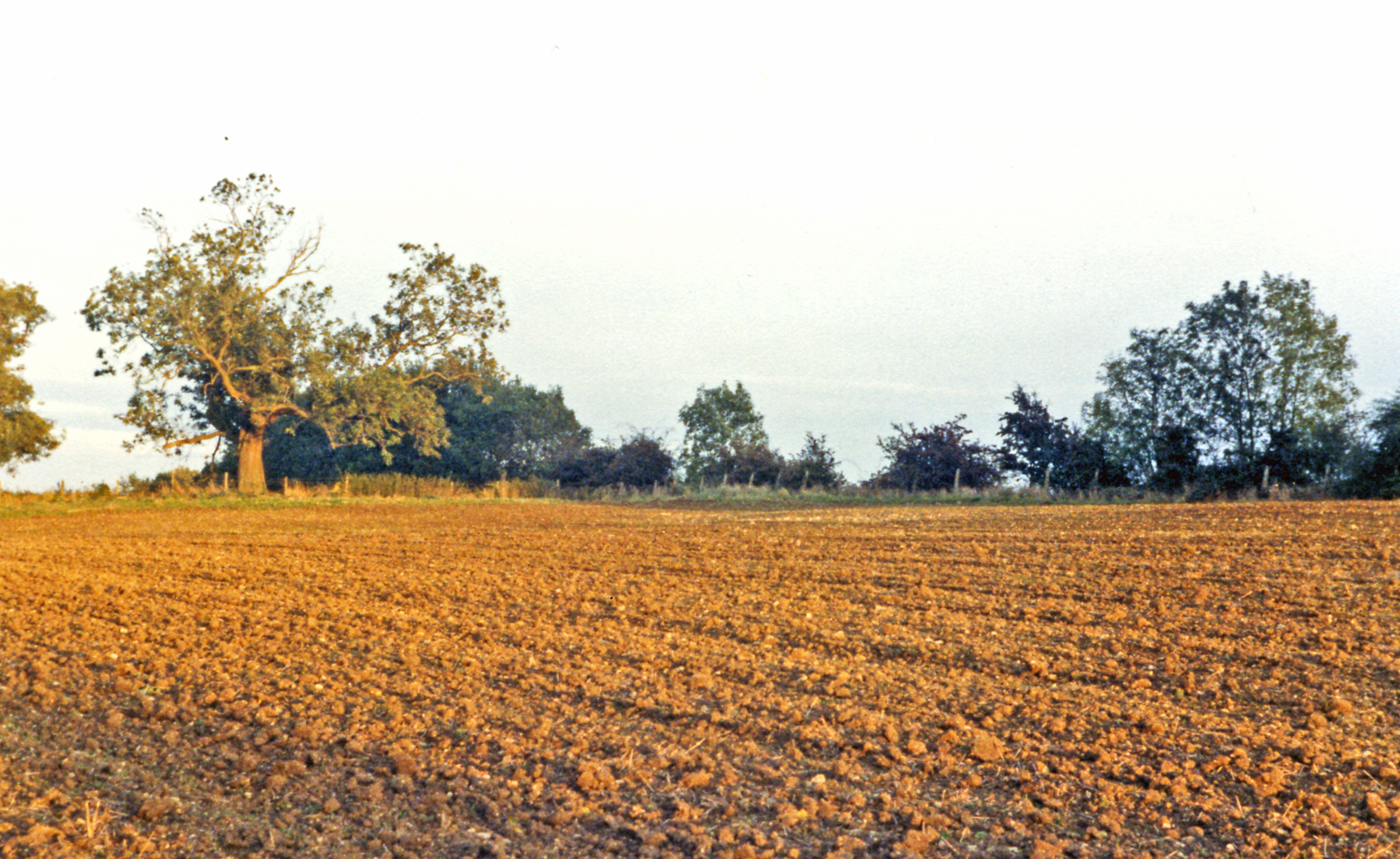
- The site of the station, looking southeast towards Thrapston, in 1987

General information
- Location: Cranford, Northamptonshire; England
- Coordinates: 52.3814°N 0.6424°W
- Grid reference: SP925768
- Platforms: 1

Other information
- Status: Disused

History
- Original company: Kettering, Thrapston and Huntingdon Railway
- Pre-grouping: Midland Railway
- Post-grouping: London, Midland and Scottish Railway; British Railways (London Midland Region)

Key dates
- 1 March 1866: Opened
- 2 April 1956: Closed to passengers
- 6 November 1961: Closed to goods
Location

Cranford railway station served the civil parish of Cranford, Northamptonshire, England, from 1866 to 1961 on the Kettering, Thrapston and Huntingdon Railway.

== History ==
The station was opened on 1 March 1866 by the Kettering, Thrapston and Huntingdon Railway. It closed to passengers on 2 April 1956 but remained open to goods traffic until 6 November 1961.

Preceding station	Disused railways	Following station
Kettering; Line closed station open	Kettering, Thrapston and Huntingdon Railway	Twywell; Line and station closed
