= Edward Wingfield =

Edward Wingfield may refer to:

- Edward Maria Wingfield (1550–1631), English colonist in America
- Sir Edward Wingfield of Kimbolton (died 1603), English politician
- Edward Wingfield, 2nd Viscount Powerscourt (1729–1764), Irish politician
- Sir Edward Wingfield (civil servant) (1834–1910), British civil servant
