= Buckden railway station =

Former railway station in Cambridgeshire, England

Coordinates: 52.3062°N 0.2359°W

Buckden
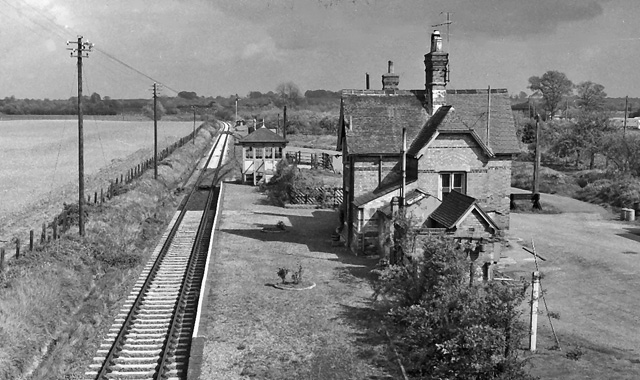
- The station in 1961

General information
- Location: Buckden, Huntingdonshire; England
- Platforms: 1

Other information
- Status: Disused

History
- Original company: Midland Railway
- Pre-grouping: Midland Railway
- Post-grouping: London, Midland and Scottish Railway

Key dates
- 1 Mar 1866: Opened as Brampton
- 1 Feb 1868: Renamed Buckden
- 15 Jun 1959: Closed
Location

Buckden railway station was a railway station in Buckden, Cambridgeshire. The station and its line closed in 1959. The signal box is now preserved and in use as Tunbridge Wells West signal box on the Spa Valley Railway.

Preceding station	Disused railways	Following station
Grafham	Midland Railway; Kettering to Huntingdon Line	Huntingdon East
