= Godmanchester railway station =

Railway station in Godmanchester, England

Godmanchester

General information
- Location: Godmanchester, Huntingdonshire; England
- Coordinates: 52.3262°N 0.1752°W
- Platforms: 2

Other information
- Status: Disused

History
- Original company: East Anglian Railways
- Pre-grouping: Great Northern and Great Eastern Joint Railway
- Post-grouping: London and North Eastern Railway

Key dates
- 19 August 1847: Opened as Huntingdon
- 1 July 1882: Renamed Godmanchester
- 15 June 1959: Closed to passengers
- 4 June 1962: Closed to freight
Location

Godmanchester railway station was a railway station situated in the town of Godmanchester in Huntingdonshire, England. It was situated on the Huntingdon to St Ives line.

== History ==
The station was built by the Ely and Huntingdon Railway (E&HR), and opened on 19 August 1847; it was originally named Huntingdon. Prior to opening, the E&HR amalgamated with the Lynn and Dereham Railway and the Lynn and Ely Railway to form the East Anglian Railways (EAR). The EAR was absorbed by the Great Eastern Railway (GER) in 1862. The line and station were transferred to the Great Northern and Great Eastern Joint Railway (GN&GEJR) in 1879, and on 1 July 1882, the station was renamed Godmanchester. The GN&GEJR became part of the London and North Eastern Railway when that company was created in the 1923 Grouping by amalgamation of the GER with several other railways.

The station closed to passengers on 15 June 1959 and to freight on 4 June 1962. It has since been demolished. The adjacent listed crossing keeper's cottage was restored in 2025

Preceding station	Disused railways	Following station
Huntingdon East	GN and GE Joint Railway	St Ives
