= Thomas Studley =

Virginia merchant and politician (1580–1607)

- Born: c. 1580; England
- Died: August 28, 1607
- Occupation: Cape merchant

Thomas Studley (c. 1580 – August 28, 1607), sometimes spelled Thomas Stoodie, was an English-born early American settler who served as the first "cape merchant" (a sort of storehouse manager) of the Jamestown Colony. Studley wrote a portion of The Proceedings of the English Colonie in Virginia and his writings were credited in John Smith's 1612 A map of Virginia, including the now infamous chapter regarding Pocahontas.

== Biography ==
Studley was born around the 1580s in England. Studley arrived to Jamestown in May 1607 and was listed as one of the "gentlemen" colonists. Little is recorded about Studley's family, but he did have at least one daughter, Amy.

In May 1607, Studley was selected as the first cape-merchant (similar to a role of Chief Factor) of the colony. In the role, he was responsible for financial and material oversight as the colony's chief merchant, and in written accounts he was quoted as giving observations of the supply situation, living conditions and hardships of the colony. Studley's records reflect how dire conditions were during his time, a period called the "Dying Time" that directly preceded the Starving Time.

=== Death ===
Studley died on August 28, 1607. After Studley's death, he was succeeded in the post of Cape-Merchant by Daniel Tucker. Studley is interred at the Fort James Cemetery at the Jamestown Settlement.

== Works ==
- A map of Virginia (1612) – credited posthumously as co-author of chapters 1-4. His contribution included the chapter regarding Pocahontas.
