= Huntingdon East railway station =

Disused railway station in Huntingdon, Cambridgeshire

Huntingdon East
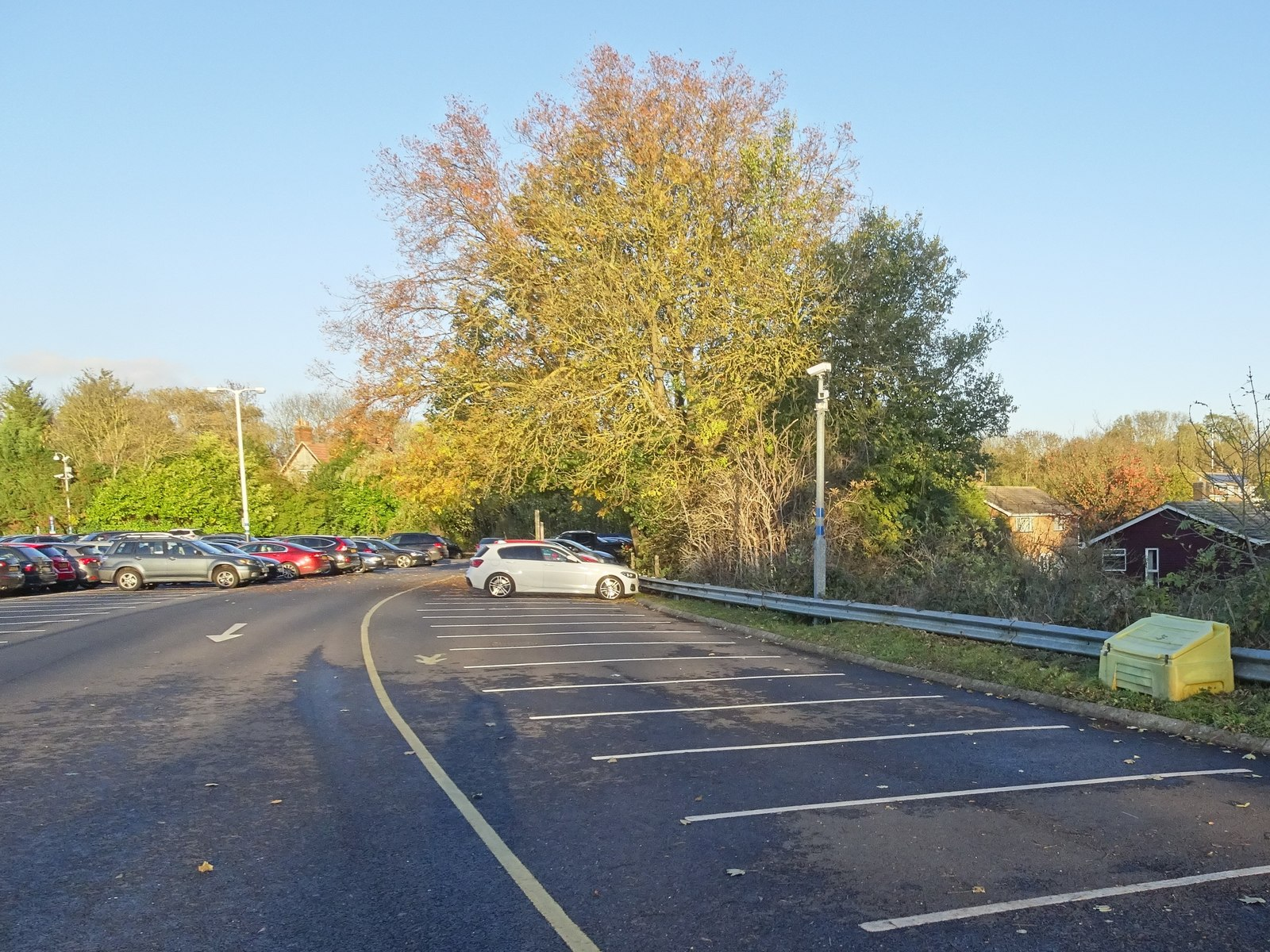
- The site of the station in 2018

General information
- Location: Huntingdon, Cambridgeshire; England
- Coordinates: 52.3279°N 0.192°W
- Grid reference: TL233715
- Platforms: 3

Other information
- Status: Disused

History
- Original company: Great Northern and Great Eastern Joint Railway
- Post-grouping: London and North Eastern Railway; British Railways (Eastern Region)

Key dates
- 1 May 1883: Opened as Huntingdon
- 1 July 1923: Renamed Huntingdon East
- 18 September 1959: Closed to passengers
- circa 1962: Closed completely
Location

Huntingdon East railway station served the town of Huntingdon, Cambridgeshire, England from 1883 to 1959.

== History ==
The station opened on 1 May 1883 by the Great Northern and Great Eastern Joint Railway. It was situated east of the present Huntingdon railway station. There was another station that was opened in 1847 which was called Huntingdon but when this station opened the original station was renamed Godmanchester to avoid confusion. The station was renamed Huntingdon East on 1 July 1923. The station closed to passengers on 15 June 1959 and goods traffic on 18 September 1959 after the Huntingdon to St. Ives line closed, although military trains and excursions continued to serve the station in the 1960s.

Preceding station	Disused railways	Following station
Buckden	GN and GE Joint Railway	Godmanchester
