= Stonely =

Hamlet in Cambridgeshire, England

Coordinates: 52.2904°N 0.3756°W

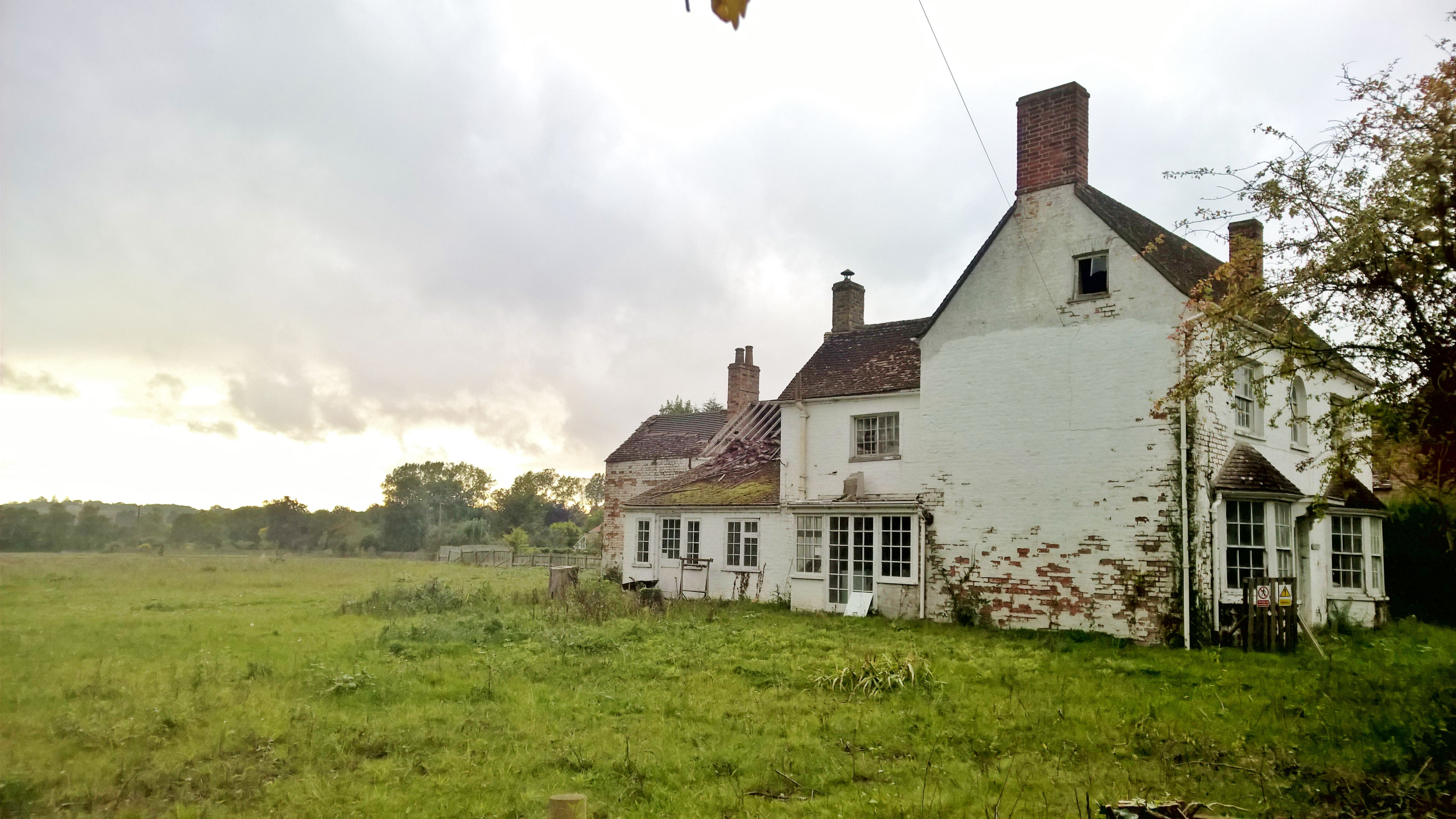
Derelict house at Stonely

Stonely is a hamlet next to Kimbolton in Huntingdonshire district, Cambridgeshire, England. It is part of the civil parish of Kimbolton, which is served by Kimbolton and Stonely Parish Council. The hamlet was formerly the site of the Augustinian Stonely Priory. Stonely is designated as a conservation area. It has 17 listed buildings, including Kimbrook House and Stonely Grange.

The Ordnance Survey grid reference is TL109670.
