= John Wingfield (disambiguation) =

John Wingfield may refer to:

- John Wingfield (before 1585–1596), English soldier.
- John Wingfield (MP) (1560–1626), English politician
- John Wingfield (priest) (1915–1983), English Anglican Archdeacon of Bodmin
- John David Wingfield (1916–1942), United States Naval Reserve
- Harry Wingfield (John Henry Wingfield, 1910–2002), English illustrator
- John Henry Ducachet Wingfield (1833–1898), first bishop of the Episcopal Diocese of Northern California (1874–1898)

== See also ==
- John de Wingfield, 14th-century Chief of Staff to Edward, the Black Prince
- John Wingfield Malcolm, 1st Baron Malcolm (1833–1902), British politician
