= William Wingfield =

William Wingfield may refer to:

- William Wingfield (MP for Bodmin) (1772–1858), English lawyer and MP for Bodmin
- William Wingfield (14th century MP), for Suffolk
- William Wingfield (died 1639), MP for Lichfield
- William Wingfield (MP for Stafford), see Stafford (UK Parliament constituency)
- William Wingfield (cricketer, born 1834) (1834–1913), English cricketer and clergyman
- William Wingfield (Surrey cricketer) (1857–1938), English cricketer
- William Pete Wingfield (born 1948), English record producer, performer and singer
