= Thomas Wingfield =

Thomas Wingfield may refer to:

- Thomas Wingfield (MP for Sandwich) (died c.1550), MP for Sandwich, 1529, 1536
- Thomas Maria Wingfield (died 1557), MP for Huntingdon, 1553,1554 and Huntingdonshire, 1555
- Tom Wingfield, character in The Glass Menagerie
- Thomas Wingfield, character in Montezuma's Daughter
