= Stone Castle =

Castle in Kent, England

Coordinates: 51°26′36″N 0°16′40″E

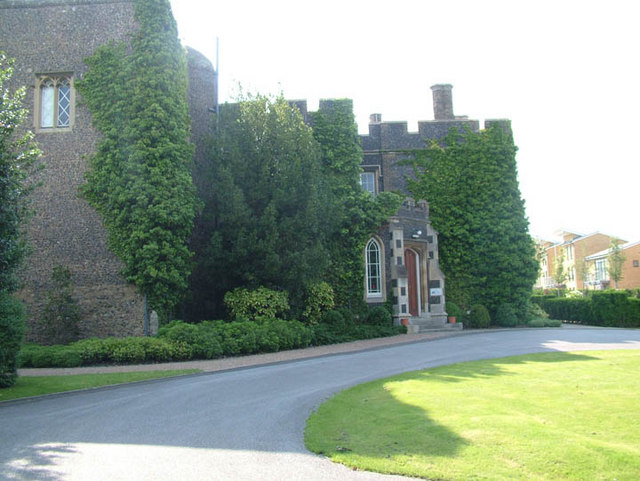
Stone Castle seen from the east

Stone Castle is a castle at Stone, near Western Quarry in Kent, England. It was built between 1135 and 1140 on the site where William the Conqueror signed a treaty with the men of Kent in 1067.

== History ==
It was owned by the Wiltshire family, which included Bridget Wingfield, a close friend of Anne Boleyn, whose correspondence was used to help condemn the queen for adultery. In 1527, it was visited by Thomas Wolsey, Thomas More and the Earl of Derby. This was around the time Henry was first battling to marry Anne Boleyn, who lived at Hever Castle twenty miles away.

During World War II, the RAF occupied the castle. It is now owned by Blue Circle, and the land was leased to Land Securities in 2000. It is now occupied by a Private Ambulance Company, Savoy Ventures until August of 2024 where they entered administration and is not not occupied by anyone.
