= Wingfield baronets =

Extinct baronetcy in the Baronetage of England

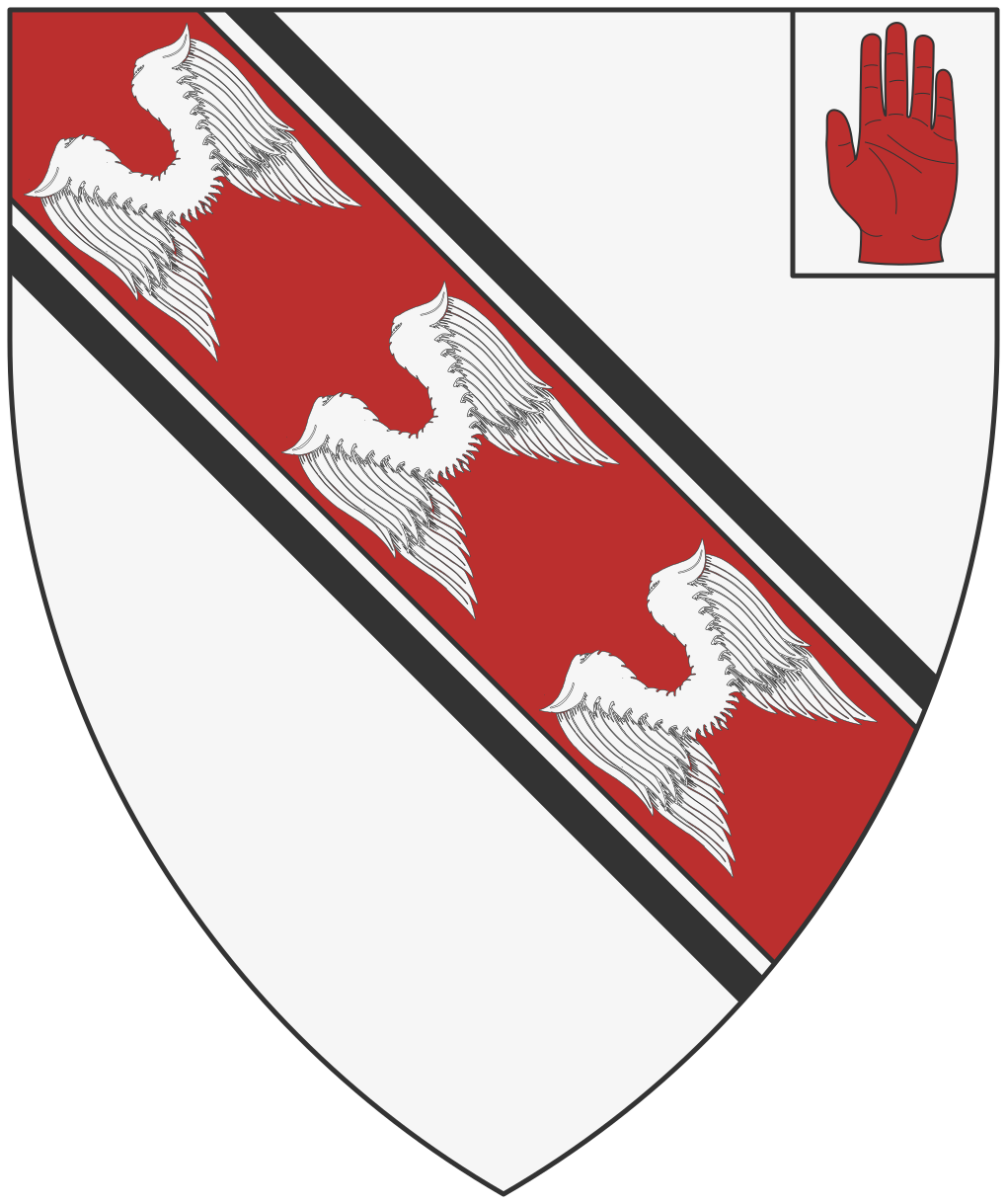
Arms of Wingfield: Argent, on a bend gules cottised sable three wings conjoined in lure of the field

The Wingfield Baronetcy, of Goodwins (now Godwin's Place, in the parish of Letheringham) in the County of Suffolk, was a title in the Baronetage of England. It was created on 17 May 1627 for Anthony Wingfield. The title became extinct on the death of the sixth Baronet some time after 1727.

== Wingfield baronets, of Goodwins (1627) ==
- Sir Anthony Wingfield, 1st Baronet (c. 1585 – 1638)
- Sir Richard Wingfield, 2nd Baronet (died c. 1656)
- Sir Robert Wingfield, 3rd Baronet (c. 1652 – c. 1671)
- Sir Henry Wingfield, 4th Baronet (c. 1655 – 1677)
- Sir Henry Wingfield, 5th Baronet (c. 1673 – 1712)
- Sir Mervyn Wingfield, 6th Baronet (c. 1675 – d. after 1727)
