= Stonely Priory =

Augustinian priory in Cambridgeshire, England

Coordinates: 52.2950°N 0.3680°W

Stonely Priory was an Augustinian priory in Cambridgeshire, England. It was dissolved in 1536.

== History ==
A tradition recorded by Leland hold that the priory of St. Mary at Stonely was founded about 1180 by William de Mandeville. However, as this William de Mandeville did not hold Kimbolton, the Priory may have been founded by William FitzGeoffrey de Mandeville, 3rd Earl of Essex, who succeeded his brother Geoffrey in 1216 and died in 1227. It was an Augustinian monastery, and possibly originated as a hospital. The advowson of the priory belonged to the lords of Kimbolton.

The earliest recorded reference to the priory is in the Hundred Roll of 1274, when the manor of Kimbolton was in the hands of the family of de Bohun. It was a small monastery, and probably never held more than seven canons. Very little is known of its history. There are no foundation charters extant. In 1366 the parish church of Kimbolton was appropriated to the use of the canons, the parish church was served by canons from the priory.

Bishop William Alnwick visited the priory in 1442. The prior was accused of maintaining his own kinsfolk out of the revenues of the house; but this was only asserted by a brother who had just been accused of visiting the village in secular attire. No other charges were made.

The first known prior was John de Ripton (d. 1309) and the last Edmund Bonde. In 1534 the prior and canons signed the Acknowledgment of Royal Supremacy. The surrender of the house was made under the first Act in 1536; with the canons probably allowed to serve as secular priests.

In 1552 the estate was purchased by Thomas Mary Wingfield, who died in 1557, leaving it to his son and heir, Edward Maria Wingfield, aged 7, who was born at Stonely. He was one of the patentees of Virginia in 1606 and 1607 and accompanied the first colonists to Jamestown, but returned in 1608.

Scattered earth works and crop marks are all that remain.

The Priory Cottage, possibly a former stable, was converted to residential use in the 19th century. It is a listed building.
