= Jacques Wingfield =

Anglo-Irish soldier and politician

- Born: c.1519
- Died: 1587; Ireland
- Occupations: Soldier, Official

Jacques Wingfield (c.1519–1587) was an Anglo-Irish soldier and public official of the Tudor era. He is also sometimes known as John Wingfield or Jack Wingfield.

== Life ==
He was the third son of Richard Wingfield and Bridget Wingfield, who was the heiress of Stone Castle. He spent much of his youth in Calais, which was then an English possession. Fluent in French he spent time in Paris at the French court. He entered Bishop Stephen Gardiners household in 1531 and remains as the Bishops servant for the next 24 years. His uncle, Lewis Wingfield, had been comptroller of Bishop Fox's household, likely paving the way for his nephews succession. He travelled to Paris with Gardiner in 1538, where he spent time at French court. He was described as popular among the French court, but also as an outspoken defender of England. From 1540 he became Baillif of the episcopal mannor of Bishops Sutton, Hampshire and from 1541, of Farnham, Surrey. From October 1553 till April 1554, Jacques served as the Steward of Taunton, of which the Borough, Castle and Manor belonged to the Bishop of Winchester, Stephen Gardiner. It was likely with Bishop Gardiners nomination that he secured this seat in Marys first parliament for Taunton, a manor of the See of Winchester. Bishop Gardiner, a devout catholic, had reluctantly conformed to Protestantism, however during the reign of King Edward IV he would be imprisoned in the Tower of London as punishment for his continued deliverance of the catholic sermon. Jacques Wingfield continually wrote to the Duke of Somerset, Edward Seymour campaigning for Gardiners release. He sat as a named proctor in Gardiner's 1551 trial, in which he gives details of the numbers and quality of the Gardiner household and reiterated his loyalty to the Bishop. Gardiner died in 1555, leaving Wingfield £40 for his service.

== Ireland ==
Jacques Wingfield first arrived at Dublin quay on the 24th of May 1556. He travelled from England with Thomas Radcliffe, Sir Henry Sidney, William Fitzwilliam, Mr. Henry Stafford, Mr. George Delves, amongst others. In 1557, Wingfield is named as a witness to the examination of Gaelic chieftain, Phelim ‘McNel’ (O’ Neill) Boy. Shortly thereafter, he returns to England to bring troops from England on behalf of Thomas Radclyffe. In 1558, Queen Elizabeth I enquires with the Lord Deputy, Henry Sussex regarding a significant delay in the delivery of these troops. Following the Queens inquiry, Wingfield completes the transfer of 400 troops to Ireland in June 1558. Upon his return, the Queen directs Lord Deputy Sussex to appoint Wingfield as the Master of Ordnance for Ireland. He was appointed to the Irish Council in 1559 by the Lord Lieutenant of Ireland Thomas Radclyffe, 3rd Earl of Sussex, of whom he was a noted supporter. Following this, Wingfield was also appointed Constable of Dublin castle. The Queen granted him patent to the office of ordnance for life in 1560.

In 1560, 'Old' O' Connor escaped from Dublin Castle under Wingfields watch. Wingfield was cautioned by Fitzwilliam and told to 'look more carefully' at the castle.

Along with Sir Nicholas Heron, Wingfield had special responsibilities concerning Gaelic inhabitants.

In 1561 he suffered a military defeat during a skirmish with Shane O'Neill, the leading Gaelic lord in Ulster, who enjoyed strained relations with the Crown. A letter from the Lord Lieutenant Sussex details the disastrous engagement with O’ Neill. Sussex states that ‘by the cowardice of some, all were like to have been lost, and by the worthiness of two men all was restored’ and that 50 of his best footmen were slain, and another 50 wounded. He praised the ‘gallant conduct’ of William Fitzwilliam and Captain Humphrey Warne who he credited with the aversion of a catastrophe. Although Elizabeth I wanted him to be dismissed from his post for his cowardice, Sussex and William Cecil lobbied on his behalf and he remained in office until his death. Sussex wrote to the Queen detailing Wingfield's account of the engagement, stating that Wingfield denied having run away, but that once his horsemen fled, he did so himself. Sussex appeals directly to the Privy council of England that Wingfields case may be heard and tried there. Wingfield appeals to Lady Cecill in September 1562, imploring her husband, Lord Burghley's favour in consideration of his case, sending a prestigious tassle of goshawk in goodwill. In August 1562, William Fitzwilliam claimed in a letter to Lord Burghley that 'several' of Shane O' Neills pledges would have escaped the castle had it not been for Wingfield's early warning, which could be interpreted as an intercession on Wingfields behalf.

Wingfield travelled to England some time around January 1563 to have his case tried in England. Wingfield appears to have won his case in England, however he would not be reappointed to the Irish council, having been removed from his seat in 1562.

In October 1565, Wingfield, Sir Henry Radclyffe and Nicholas Herron were warned to return to their positions in Ireland, or to appear before the House of Lords at the next council meeting, suggesting that Wingfield had not returned since his departure in 1563. Wingfield was granted the lease of lands in Counties Limerick, Cork and Kerry, totalling a value of £100 per year.

Later in his career in Ireland, Wingfield secured land in the Munster Plantation.Wingfield was granted the lease of lands in Counties Limerick, Cork and Kerry, totalling a value of £100 per year. He appeals to Lord Burghley in November 1568 for 31 years reversion to the Parsonage of Dungarvan.

The Wingfields became a powerful New English family in Ireland. Among his relatives was Richard Wingfield, a soldier who was instrumental in the defeat of O'Doherty's Rebellion in 1608. Jacques' nephew Edward Maria Wingfield was largely raised by him, after his father's early death, and went on to be a notable settler in Virginia.[2]

== Bibliography ==
- Ellis, Steven G. Ireland in the Age of the Tudors, 1447-1603. Longman, 1998.
- Foster, Thomas A. New Men: Manliness in Early America. NYU Press, 2011.
