= Harriet Pigott =

- Born: 1775
- Died: 1846 (aged 70–71); Geneva
- Known for: her memoirs of travels

Harriett Pigott (1775–1846) was known for writing her memoirs of her travels abroad.

== Family background ==
Pigott's uncles were both aristocratic writers. Her uncle Charles Pigott had published scandalous accounts of his life under the titles of The Jockey Club and The Female Jockey Club. Her uncle Robert Pigott had been on the Grand Tour and he wrote about his views on food and dress which influenced some parts of French society during the French Revolution. Her father, William, was the rector at Chetwynd and her mother was Arabella (born Mytton).

== Life ==
In 1832 she would have come to notice when she wrote The Private Correspondence of a Woman of Fashion but it was published anonymously. This biographical book tells her story via the letters she wrote during travels abroad and back in England. Her letters say that she was "dazzled" when she saw Napoleon after he returned from the Battle of Waterloo to Paris and how she and her friends visited the battlefield within a fortnight to picnic and pick up souvenirs. She would describe her life in England in 1816. She describes anecdotes in her letters such as seeing the scandalous Ladies of Llangollen, the celebrity Sarah Siddons acting and a visit by the young Princess Charlotte and Prince Leopold to the theatre.

Whilst she was preparing her next publication, Pigott met the aging John Galt who she persuaded to edit Records of Real Life in the Palace and the Cottage. She received some criticism for this as it was suspected that she was just taking advantage of Galt who died in the same year the book was published. However her unfinished biography of him which is in the Bodleian library implies that it was more of a mutual respects than her critics allowed. Records of Real Life in the Palace and the Cottage had an introduction by Galt and this three volume work was published with her as prime author in 1839. This book was again in letter form and it documented her long visits to Germany, The Netherlands, Switzerland and France.

Her final work was a literary fairy tale, titled The Three Springs of Beauty. Pigott died in Geneva in 1846.
