= Brownlow Cecil =

Brownlow Cecil may refer to:

- Brownlow Cecil, 8th Earl of Exeter (1701–1754)
- Brownlow Cecil, 9th Earl of Exeter (1725–1793)
- Brownlow Cecil, 2nd Marquess of Exeter (1795–1867)
- Brownlow Cecil, 4th Marquess of Exeter (1849–1898)
