= Elizabeth Wilmot, Countess of Rochester =

English heiress

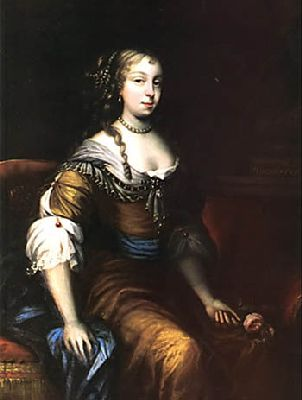
Elizabeth Wilmot (née Malet) by Peter Lely

Elizabeth Wilmot, Countess of Rochester (née Malet; (Note: The surname Malet is at times spelled Mallet or even Mallett.) 1651 – 20 August 1681) was an English heiress and the wife of John Wilmot, 2nd Earl of Rochester, the "libertine". She was the daughter of John Malet, of Enmore Manor, and Unton Hawley, daughter of Francis Hawley, 1st Baron Hawley.

== Rochester ==
John Wilmot, 2nd Earl of Rochester became infatuated with Elizabeth Malet and asked for her hand in marriage. She refused to marry the earl, and on 26 May 1665 he attempted to abduct her. In his diaries, Samuel Pepys describes Elizabeth Malet as the "great beauty and fortune of the North" and notes the scandal of her kidnapping by Rochester:

Thence to my Lady Sandwich’s, where, to my shame, I had not been a great while before. Here, upon my telling her a story of my Lord Rochester’s running away on Friday night last with Mrs. Mallett, the great beauty and fortune of the North, who had supped at White Hall with Mrs. Stewart, and was going home to her lodgings with her grandfather, my Lord Haly, by coach; and was at Charing Cross seized on by both horse and foot men, and forcibly taken from him, and put into a coach with six horses, and two women provided to receive her, and carried away. Upon immediate pursuit, my Lord of Rochester (for whom the King had spoke to the lady often, but with no successe) was taken at Uxbridge; but the lady is not yet heard of, and the King mighty angry, and the Lord sent to the Tower. Hereupon my Lady did confess to me, as a great secret, her being concerned in this story. For if this match breaks between my Lord Rochester and her, then, by the consent of all her friends, my Lord Hinchingbroke stands fair, and is invited for her. She is worth, and will be at her mother’s death (who keeps but a little from her), 2500l. per annum. (Note: In the quote from Pepys "Mrs. Stewart" is Frances Teresa Stuart, duchess of Richmond and Lennox, "my Lord Haly" is Francis Hawley, 1st Baron Hawley, and "Lord Hinchingbroke" is Edward Montagu, Viscount Hinchingbroke at the time and later 2nd Earl of Sandwich.)

Graham Greene corrects Pepys. He writes about the Heiress of the West.

Elizabeth Malet later forgave Rochester, and they were married on 29 January 1667.

After the couple married, Rochester spent much of his time in London, where he engaged in public affairs, most famously with the actress Elizabeth Barry. Elizabeth Wilmot stayed in his house, Adderbury House in Oxfordshire, along with Rochester's mother Anne Wilmot, Countess of Rochester, her mother Unton Hawley, and Rochester's nieces Eleanor and Anne Lee (later the poet Anne Wharton).

== Issue ==
By her husband, John Wilmot, 2nd Earl of Rochester, Elizabeth Wilmot had four children:

1. Charles Wilmot, 3rd Earl of Rochester (christened 2 January 1670/71 – 12 November 1681)
2. Lady Anne Wilmot (christened 30 August 1669 – 8 August 1703) married firstly Henry Bayntun, Esq., a country gentleman, by whom she had issue one son and one daughter Anne Bayntun (mother of Sir Edward Bayntun-Rolt, 1st Baronet). She married secondly the poet Hon. Francis Greville, MP (1 July 1667 – 11 October 1710), eldest son of Fulke Greville, 5th Baron Brooke of Beauchamps Court, and had two sons, the 6th and 7th Barons Brooke; the 7th Baron was father of Francis Greville, 1st Earl of Warwick.
3. Lady Elizabeth Wilmot (christened 13 July 1674 – 1 July 1757); she married 8 July 1689 Edward Montagu, 3rd Earl of Sandwich (10 April 1670 – 20 October 1729), and had issue, one daughter (who died young) and one son Edward Montagu, Viscount Hinchingbrooke, father of John Montagu, 4th Earl of Sandwich (for whom the sandwich is named). She became renowned for her learning and wit.
4. Lady Malet Wilmot (christened 6 January 1676 – 13 January 1708/9) married John Vaughan, 1st Viscount Lisburne on 18 August 1692; their son was Wilmot Vaughan, 3rd Viscount Lisburne, father of Wilmot Vaughan, 1st Earl of Lisburne, ancestor of the present Earl.

== Death ==
Elizabeth Wilmot died in 1681, a little more than a year after her husband, aged 29 or 30. Her son Charles died soon thereafter.

== Poetry ==
Elizabeth Wilmot's poetry survives in a manuscript that she and her husband produced together. The manuscript, now held by the University of Nottingham, includes songs and a fragment of a pastoral attributed to Elizabeth Wilmot, some of which has been anthologized in Kissing the Rod: An Anthology of Seventeenth-Century Women's Verse.

== In popular culture ==
In the 2004 movie The Libertine, Elizabeth was portrayed by Rosamund Pike.

== See also ==
- List of kidnappings
- List of solved missing person cases
