= Merry Gang =

English libertine aristocrats (fl. 1660–1679)

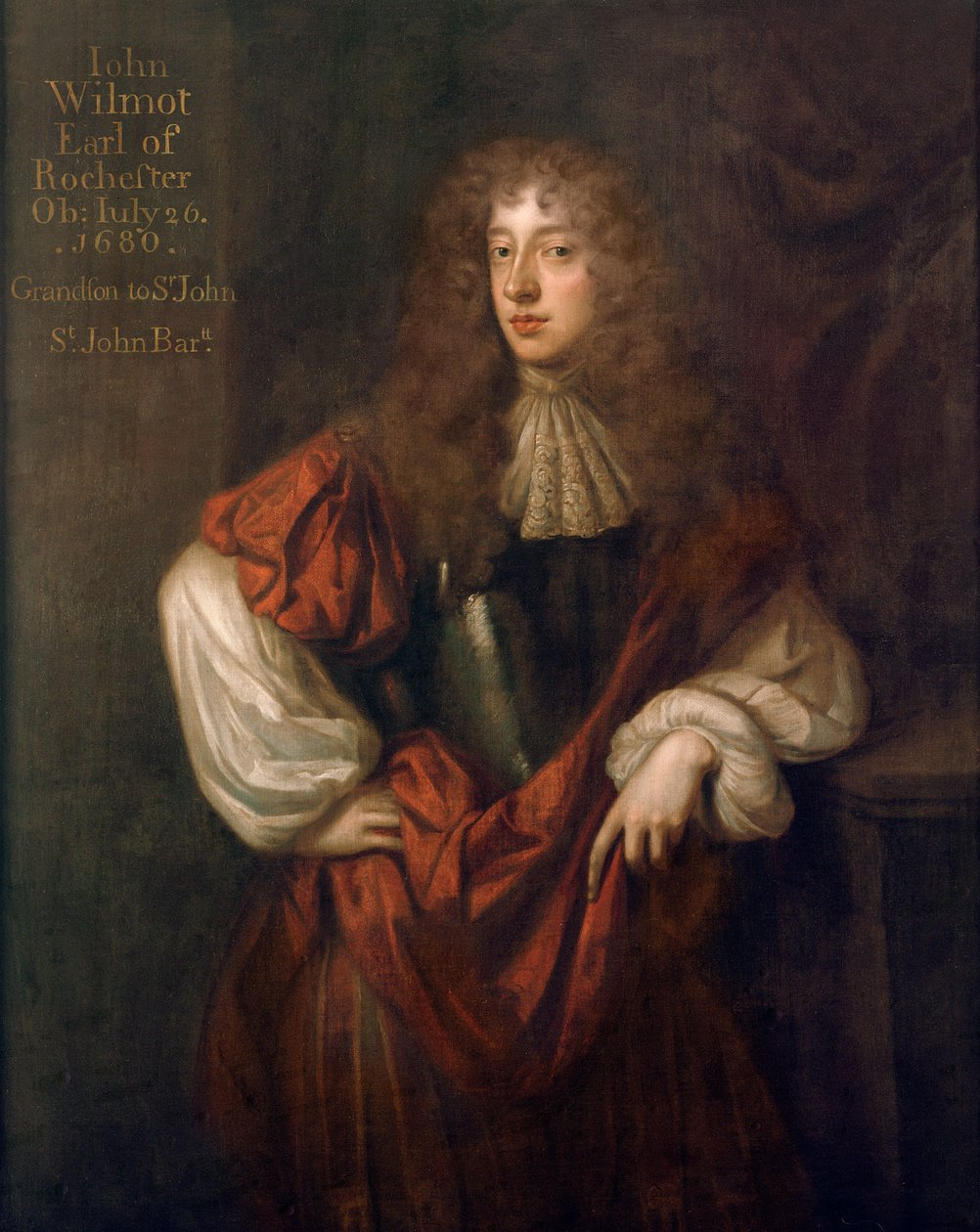
Lord Rochester, the group's leading member

The Merry Gang was a group of aristocrats associated with the court of Charles II of England during the Stuart Restoration of 1660. The gang was centred on John Wilmot, 2nd Earl of Rochester, who stated their aim was to restore the idea of masculinity that had prevailed at the time of Henry II (r. 1154–1189). They were also patrons of the arts, supporting the poet John Dryden and the dramatist Nathaniel Lee.

The gang advocated libertinism, drank copiously, and engaged in acts that outraged public decency, including violence towards women. Members of the gang fought with constables and watchmen and were involved in a number of killings. Charles II was indulgent towards the gang, forgiving some of their crimes. The influence of the Merry Gang declined after the 1670s, with new ideals of masculinity calling for better behaviour.

== Naming and members ==
The gang were known by various names; they were dubbed the Merry Gang by the contemporary poet Andrew Marvell, politician Samuel Pepys called them the "counsellors of pleasure" and the Lord Chancellor Edward Hyde, 1st Earl of Clarendon called them the "men of mirth". Historian J. H. Wilson, writing in 1967, called them the "Court Wits". The leader of the gang, John Wilmot, 2nd Earl of Rochester, referred to its members as "Rake-Hells". Other members included George Villiers, 2nd Duke of Buckingham, Richard Vaughan, 2nd Earl of Carbery, Charles Sackville, Lord Buckhurst, George Etherege, Sir Charles Sedley, Sir Fleetwood Sheppard, Henry Guy, Henry Killigrew, Henry Savile, and William Wycherley, as well as many leading literary figures of the period. Historian Christopher Tilmouth, in his book Passion's Triumph over Reason (2010), named James Scott, 1st Duke of Monmouth and John Sheffield, Earl of Mulgrave, not as members of the set but instead behaving in a similar manner to it. Buckhurst in particular enjoyed royal favour: his grandmother had been governess to Charles II and the king rewarded the family with numerous titles and land holdings.

== Practices ==
The Merry Gang were advocates of libertinism. Members of the gang asserted the right to behave as they pleased and their antics were intended to draw the attention and amusement of the king. Rochester claimed his aim was to halt "the strange decay of manly parts since the days of dear Harry the Second (r. 1154–1189)". The gang engaged in acts that were loud, outraged public decency and often included violence against women.

When Rochester was out of the country in February 1662, Buckhurst and his brother were imprisoned for the killing and robbing of a tanner in London. The two men claimed to have killed the tanner by mistake whilst chasing a thief, and were pardoned by Charles II in June. The Merry Gang often breached the peace in the streets and engaged in fights with constables. In 1663, Sedley and Buckhurst appeared naked on the balcony of a pub in Covent Garden, where the former mimed lewd acts, blasphemed, and drank a toast to the king with wine in which he had washed his genitalia. An enraged mob unsuccessfully attempted to break into the pub to apprehend the men. Sedley was afterwards fined £500 but, remaining on good terms with Charles II, apparently escaped having to pay it.

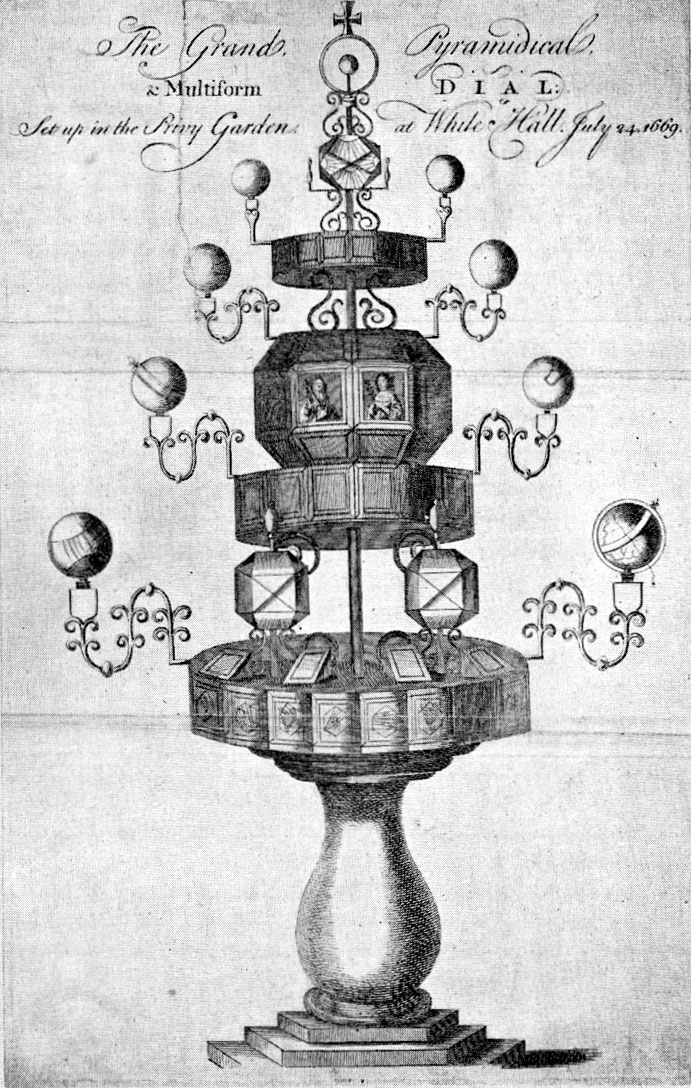
The Whitehall sundial

In 1666, Buckingham became a lover of Anna Talbot, Countess of Shrewsbury (she had earlier been involved with Killigrew). Two years later, Buckingham fought Francis Talbot, 11th Earl of Shrewsbury in a duel over the affair. Buckingham mortally wounded the Earl and afterwards took the countess into his home, sending his own wife to live with her father. Around this time Killigrew circulated a falsified paper purporting to be from the countess and testifying to his virility. Charles II pardoned Buckingham over the killing of Shrewsbury. In 1671, a Thomas Muddyman reported to Rochester that Savile had broken into the bedroom of "Lady Northumberland" (presumably Elizabeth Percy, Countess of Northumberland whose husband Josceline Percy, 11th Earl of Northumberland had died in 1670) with the intention of raping her. In 1675, members of the gang, including Buckhurst, Savile, Rochester, and Sheppard, destroyed a valuable pyramidical glass sundial in the Privy Garden of the Palace of Whitehall. Rochester was heard to exclaim "what does thou stand here to fuck time!" before destroying the piece with Sheppard.

In 1676, Rochester and Etherege were involved in a brawl with the watch in Epsom that left a Captain Downs dead. At different times, Sedley and Buckhurst both paid Nell Gwyn, long-time mistress of the king, £100 a year to live with them; she also spent a period living with Rochester. Gwyn's 1679 funeral was attended by all of the gang. Despite their reputation for sexual liberalism, scandals were rare and Rochester and Savile were notable for withdrawing from court when scandal did occur.

The gang were sometime patrons of the arts. The poet John Dryden benefitted from their patronage and the dramatist Nathaniel Lee was an associate. The latter drank often with gang members and spent five years in a mental asylum because of the effects of his alcohol consumption. The activities of the Merry Gang often featured in anti-Stuart propaganda. The influence of the gang and other rakes at court declined after the 1670s as a new standard for masculinity became defined by better manners.
