= Dudley baronets of Clopton (1660) =

Escutcheon of the Dudley baronets of Clopton

The Dudley baronetcy, of Clopton in the County of Northampton, was created in the Baronetage of England on 1 August 1660 for William Dudley. He was High Sheriff of Northamptonshire that year, and was briefly Member of Parliament for Northampton in 1663. The 2nd Baronet represented both Northampton and Huntingdonshire in Parliament.

The title became extinct on the death of the 3rd Baronet in 1764.

== Dudley baronets, of Clopton (1660) ==
- Sir William Dudley, 1st Baronet (died 1670)
- Sir Matthew Dudley, 2nd Baronet (1661–1721)
- Sir William Dudley, 3rd Baronet (1696–1764)
