= Robert Shirley (MP) =

British politician

Robert Shirley (27 May 1700 – 12 July 1738) was a British Tory politician who sat in the House of Commons from 1727 to 1734.

The eleventh son of Robert Shirley, 1st Earl Ferrers (and eldest by his second wife, Selina Finch), Robert inherited the estate of Ettington and an equal share, with his three full brothers, in the family's lands in Ireland (the Shirleys held the western moiety of the Barony of Farney) when his father died in 1717.

At the 1727 election, Shirley was returned as Member of Parliament for Stamford on the Earl of Exeter's interest. A Tory, he resolutely opposed Robert Walpole's ministry, but did not stand again in 1734. He died in 1738, leaving Ettington to his next brother, George.

Parliament of Great Britain
Preceded by Charles Bertie; William Noel	Member of Parliament for Stamford; 1727–1734; With: William Noel	Succeeded by William Noel; John Proby
