= Robert Montagu, 3rd Duke of Manchester =

British politician

His Grace The Duke of Manchester
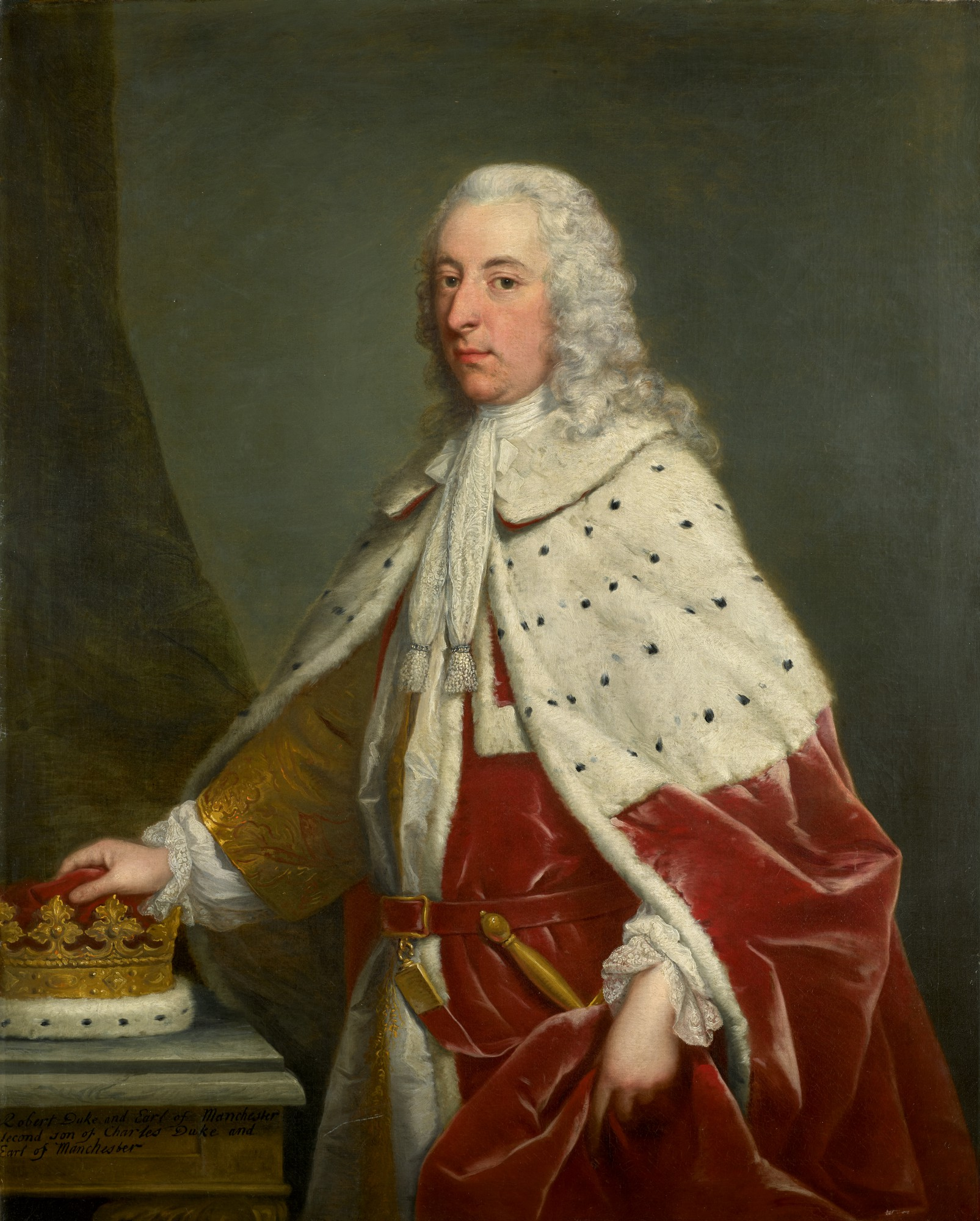

Member of Parliament for Huntingdonshire
- In office 1734–1739 Serving with Robert Piggott
- Preceded by: John Bigg; Robert Piggott
- Succeeded by: Robert Piggott; Charles Clarke

Personal details
- Born: Robert Montagu c. 1710
- Died: 10 May 1762 (aged 51–52)
- Party: Whig
- Spouse: Harriet Dunch (after 1735)
- Children: 4
- Parent(s): Charles Montagu, 1st Duke of Manchester; Dodington Greville
- Relatives: William Montagu, 2nd Duke of Manchester (brother); Charlotte Byng, Viscountess Torrington (sister)

Robert Montagu, 3rd Duke of Manchester (c. 1710 – 10 May 1762) was a British politician who sat in the House of Commons from 1734 until 1739 when he succeeded to the peerage as Duke of Manchester.

== Early life ==
Montagu was the son of Charles Montagu, 1st Duke of Manchester (1662–1721/2) and the former Hon. Dodington Greville (1671/2–1720/1). His elder brother was William Montagu, 2nd Duke of Manchester (who married Lady Isabella Montagu eldest daughter of John Montagu, 2nd Duke of Montagu and Lady Mary Churchill), Lady Charlotte Montagu (who married Pattee Byng, 2nd Viscount Torrington), and Lady Doddington Montagu.

His paternal grandparents were Robert Montagu, 3rd Earl of Manchester and the former Anne Yelverton (a daughter of Sir Christopher Yelverton, 1st Baronet). His maternal grandparents were Robert Greville, 4th Baron Brooke (son of Robert Greville, 2nd Baron Brooke) and the former Anne Dodington (daughter and heiress of John Doddington of Breamore, MP for Lymington). After his grandfather's death, his grandmother remarried to Thomas Hoby.

== Career ==
On 28 April 1719, his father, then the 4th Earl of Manchester, was created the Duke of Manchester by King George I. Upon his father's death, his elder brother succeeded as the 2nd Duke of Manchester.

Montagu was returned as a Whig MP for Huntingdonshire at the 1734 British general election. He vacated his seat when he succeeded his brother, who died without issue, to the peerage and the Manchester Duchy in 1739. Between 1739 and 1762, he held the office of Lord-Lieutenant of Huntingdonshire. As Lord Lieutenant he personally served as Colonel of the Huntingdonshire Militia when it was reformed in 1759.

From 1735 to 1737, he served as Vice-Chamberlain to the Queen Consort. He was a Lord of the Bedchamber from 1739 to 1761, and Lord Chamberlain to Queen Charlotte from 1761 until his death in 1762.

== Personal life ==
On 3 April 1735, Montagu was married to Harriet Dunch, daughter and co-heiress of Edmund Dunch and his wife Elizabeth Godfrey, a noted beauty. She was a sister-in-law of Hugh Boscawen, 1st Viscount Falmouth and niece of John Churchill, 1st Duke of Marlborough. Together, Harriet and Robert were the parents of:

- George Montagu, 4th Duke of Manchester (1737–1788), who married Elizabeth Dashwood (1740–1832), eldest daughter of Sir James Dashwood, 2nd Baronet, in 1762.
- Lord Charles Greville Montagu (1741–1783), who married Elizabeth Bulmer, a daughter of James Bulmer, in 1765.
- Lady Caroline Montagu (d. 1818), who married Charles Herbert, grandson of Thomas Herbert, 8th Earl of Pembroke, in 1775.
- Lady Louisa Montagu, who died unmarried.

The 3rd Duke of Manchester died on 10 May 1762 leaving four children.

Parliament of Great Britain
Preceded by John Bigg; Robert Piggott	Member of Parliament for Huntingdonshire; 1734–1739; With: Robert Piggott	Succeeded by Robert Piggott; Charles Clarke
Political offices
Preceded by New government	Lord of the Bedchamber; 1760–1761	Succeeded by The Duke of Richmond
New title	Lord Chamberlain to Queen Charlotte; 1761–1762	Succeeded by The Earl of Northumberland
Honorary titles
Preceded by The Duke of Manchester	Lord Lieutenant of Huntingdonshire; 1739–1762	Succeeded by The Duke of Manchester
Peerage of Great Britain
Preceded by William Montagu	Duke of Manchester; 1739–1762	Succeeded by George Montagu
