= Thomas Clarke (British Army officer) =

General Thomas Clarke
- Died: 26 October 1799; Bath, England
- Military career
- Allegiance: Great Britain
- Branch: British Army
- Rank: General
- Conflicts: Siege of Charleston

General Thomas Clarke (died 26 October 1799) was a senior British Army officer.

He was the son of Charles Clarke of Godmanchester, Huntingdonshire, Member of Parliament and Baron of the Exchequer.

He was a Captain in the short-lived Duke of Bedford's Foot (1745–46) which was raised to deal with the Jacobite rising of 1745. He then joined Colonel the Hon. Charles Howard's Regiment of Foot (which later became the 19th Foot), transferring in 1749 to be a Lieutenant and Captain in the Coldstream Guards. With them he took part in the diversionary attacks on Cherbourg and St. Malo in 1758.

Further promotions followed; Captain and Lieutenant Colonel, 1761; Brevet Colonel, 1773; Major, 1775 and Major-General, 1777. In 1780 he was engaged in the successful Siege of Charleston, South Carolina under Sir Henry Clinton during the American War of Independence.

He was made Lieutenant-General in 1782, full General on 3 May 1796 and appointed Aide-de-Camp to the King in 1773. From 1780 to 1792 he held the colonelcy of the 31st Regiment of Foot and from 1792 to 1799 that of the 30th (Cambridgeshire) Regiment of Foot.

He acted as Bailiff of Godmanchester for 1762, 1770, 1779 and 1797.

He died at Bath in 1799.
