= Fleetwood Sheppard =

English courtier and writer (1634–1698)

Fleetwood Sheppard (1 January 1634 – 25 August 1698) was an English courtier and writer who was a member of the royal courts of Charles II and William III. He was an educated man known for his lively wit and honesty, and was an important figure in the poetry of the 1680s and 1690s.

== Life ==
=== Education and introduction to royal court ===
He was born in Oxfordshire, attended Magdalen Hall and Christ Church, Oxford, gaining the Bachelor of Arts in 1654 and Master of Arts in 1657. When all persons attaining an M.A. were required to join the Church of England, King Charles intervened and said that Sheppard had a background in civil law (having studied at Gray's Inn) and was "not prepared to take orders, he being a person of much ability" (Ellis 255). Instead, Sheppard became a courtier. He was introduced to Nell Gwynn and became one of her favourite companions, along with Charles Sackville, Lord Buckhurst (later Earl of Dorset). He would remain one of Dorset's closest friends throughout his life. While satirists and gossips (such as Anthony á Wood) said that Sheppard spent his time as "a debauchee and atheist, a grand companion," others suggested that he was a fundamentally honest man who was always interested in a good joke.

He became one of Charles II's dining companions, and when Nell Gwynn gave birth to a male child, he was made the steward of Gwynn's household. This prompted a satirist to accuse him of being the best paid pimp in the land. There is little truth to this charge, however, as Sheppard was not paid by the crown for his services, except for two grants of £200.

Dorset and Sheppard went to Paris together. Additionally, Dorset would travel out to meet Sheppard when the latter went out to the country. Whether he and Dorset got in trouble in Paris for some scandalous behaviour, as Wood suggests, or not, it is true that Sheppard lived a very active life. He was stabbed beneath the eye while separating Henry Bulkeley and George Etheridge in a quarrel in a tavern.

=== Merry Gang ===
Fleetwood was part of the Merry Gang (as Andrew Marvell described them). The Merry Gang flourished for about 15 years after 1665 and included John Wilmot, 2nd Earl of Rochester, Henry Jermyn; Charles Sackville, Earl of Dorset; John Sheffield, Earl of Mulgrave; Henry Killigrew; Sir Charles Sedley; the playwrights William Wycherley and George Etherege; and George Villiers, 2nd Duke of Buckingham. The Merry Gang were advocates of libertinism. Members of the gang asserted the right to behave as they pleased and their antics were intended to draw the attention and amusement of the king. Rochester claimed his aim was to halt "the strange decay of manly parts since the days of dear Harry the Second (r. 1154–1189)". The gang engaged in acts that were loud, outraged public decency and often included violence against women.

In 1675, members of the gang, including Buckhurst, Savile, Rochester, and Sheppard, destroyed a valuable pyramidical glass sundial in the Privy Garden of the Palace of Whitehall. Rochester was heard to exclaim "what does thou stand here to fuck time!" before destroying the piece with Sheppard.

=== Exile and return to court ===
Sheppard was not liked by James II, and Sheppard did not like James, either. When Charles II died, Sheppard went into retirement. However, when William came to the throne, Sheppard was back at court and back in favour. Dorset was made the chamberlain of the royal household, and that gave him a great many places to dispense in patronage. For this, he employed Sheppard. Sheppard received the proceeds from those wishing to purchase places, and he received the favours of those wishing a good word to be placed on their behalf. At the same time, Sheppard was a favourite of the new Queen's, and John Oldmixon said that he made the Queen "very merry." In A New Way of Selling Places at Court in 1712, Jonathan Swift would say that Fleetwood Sheppard sold places that did not exist and named successors for posts that were not vacant, that he enriched himself greatly. In 1690 he was made a gentleman usher to the king. In 1694 he was knighted, became a gentleman usher to the black rod in the House of Lords, and was inducted as a knight of the garter.

=== Literary interest ===
Sheppard was a patron of many poets and one of those who discovered others. He was one of the ones, for example, who "discovered" Paradise Lost when Buckhurst bought it from a small stall at a fair. He was also present when Matthew Prior was discovered reading Horace as a tap puller in a bar and sent to school to cultivate his talents. He was also one of the main supports of Robert Gould, as well as John Oldmixon. He may have embraced the Puritan cause around 1695, and some of his old friends were disaffected by this change. Charles Gildon, Thomas Rymer, and John Dennis dedicated volumes of literary criticism to Sheppard, and John Wilmot, 2nd Earl of Rochester regarded Sheppard as the only critic he needed for his verses.

== Purported deaths, and death ==
In his last years, Sheppard was reported dead several times before he died. In 1694, Lord Godolphin heard a report that Sheppard had died, but Sheppard himself responded, saying that he was alive, but that he had suffered from "the stone" for twelve to fourteen years. In December 1697, he was again reported as dead. In July 1698, he was again reported as dead. He did die shortly afterward, but in 1768 a joking Annual Register announced that Sheppard was still alive, in good health, and 120 years old.
