= A Satyr Against Reason and Mankind =

Saitirical poem by John Wilmot

"A Satyr Against Reason and Mankind" is a satirical poem by the English Restoration poet John Wilmot, 2nd Earl of Rochester.

== Interpretation ==
"A Satyr Against Reason and Mankind" addresses the question of the proper use of reason, and is generally assumed to be a Hobbesian critique of rationalism. The narrator subordinates reason to sense. It is based to some extent on Boileau's version of Juvenal's eighth or fifteenth satire, and is also indebted to Hobbes, Montaigne, Lucretius and Epicurus, as well as the general libertine tradition. Confusion has arisen in its interpretation as it is ambiguous as to whether the speaker is Rochester himself or a satirised persona. It criticises the vanities and corruptions of the statesmen and politicians of the court of Charles II.

== Reception ==
The poem is generally supposed to have been written before June 1674, which is the dating of the earliest surviving manuscript. Along with A Ramble in St. James's Park, it is one of Rochester's best known works, and his most influential during his lifetime. It exists in some 52 manuscripts, more than any other work by the author.

It resulted in four direct poetic responses; Edward Pococke's An Answer to the Satyr against Mankind, Thomas Lessey's A Satyr In Answer to the Satyr against Man, and the two anonymous responses An answer to a Satyr [against] Reason & Mankind and An Answer to the Satyr, Against Man. It is alluded to in John Crowne's 1676 play The Country Wit. It has been argued that John Dryden addressed the poem in Religio Laici.
