= Sir William Dudley, 1st Baronet =

Sir William Dudley
- Died: September 18, 1670
- Occupation: Politician
- Parent(s): Edward Dudley of Clopton and Elizabeth Wood

Sir William Dudley, 1st Baronet (c. 1597 – 18 September 1670) was an English politician who sat in the House of Commons in 1663.

Dudley was the son of Edward Dudley of Clopton, Northamptonshire, and his wife Elizabeth Wood, daughter of Robert Wood, of Lamley, Nottinghamshire. He succeeded his elder brother Edward Dudley, who died without issue on 13 November 1641. He was created a baronet on 1 August 1660. He was Sheriff of Northamptonshire from 1660 to 1661, In March 1663, he was elected Member of Parliament for Northampton but his election was declared void on 9 April.

Dudley died at the age of 73 and was buried at Clopton.

Dudley married three times. He married firstly a daughter of Monsieur de Pleuee. She died without issue and he married secondly, Jane Smith, daughter of Sir Roger Smith, of Edmondthorpe, Leicestershire. She also died without issue and he married thirdly, Mary Pindar, daughter of Paul Pindar of London who was nephew of Sir Paul Pindar, sometime Ambassador to Constantinople.

Parliament of England
Preceded by Richard Raynsford; Sir James Langham, 2nd Baronet	Member of Parliament for Northampton; 1663; With: Richard Raynsford	Succeeded by Richard Raynsford; Christopher Hatton
Baronetage of England
New creation	Baronet (of Clopton); 1660–1670	Succeeded by Matthew Dudley
