= John Bigg (died 1748) =

British politician

- Died: March 24, 1748
- Occupation: British politician
- Known for: sat in the House of Commons from 1715 to 1734

John Bigg (died 1748), of Grafham, Huntingdonshire (now in Cambridgeshire) was a British politician who sat in the House of Commons from 1715 to 1734.

Bigg was the only son of John Bigg, MP of Grafham and his wife Frances Pedley, daughter of Sir Nicholas Pedley, MP of Huntingdon and his first wife Lucy Bernard, daughter of Sir Robert Bernard, 1st Baronet, MP of Huntingdon. He was exon (an officer rank) of the Yeomen of the Guard from 1689 to 1718. He succeeded his father to Grafham after 1708.

Bigg was returned unopposed as Member of Parliament for Huntingdonshire on the interest of the Duke of Manchester at the 1715 general election. He voted with the Administration on all occasions in that Parliament. He was returned again unopposed in 1722 and in 1727. He voted against the Government on the army in 1732 and on the repeal of the Septennial Act in 1734. He retired from Parliament in 1734 .

Bigg died unmarried on 24 March 1748, and left his estates to his sister Lucy for life and then to his friend Sir John Bernard, 4th Baronet.

Parliament of Great Britain
Preceded by Sir Matthew Dudley, Bt; Robert Pigott	Member of Parliament for Huntingdonshire; 1715–1734; With: Robert Pigott 1715–1722; Viscount Hinchingbrooke 1722; John Proby 1722–1727; Marquess of Hartington 1727–1730; Robert Pigott 1730–1734	Succeeded by Lord Robert Montagu; Robert Pigott
