= William Noel (1695–1762) =

English barrister, judge and politician

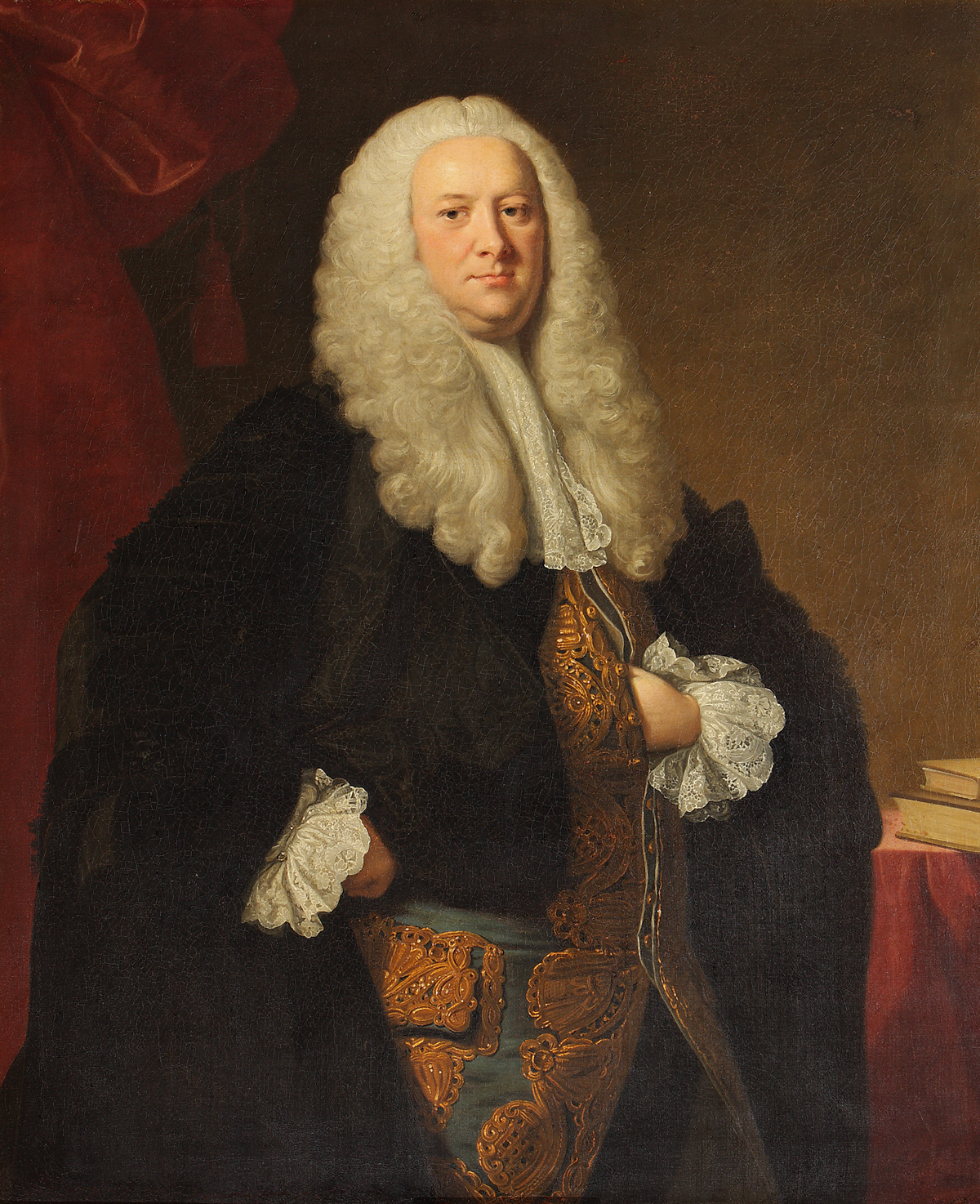
William Noel

William Noel (19 March 1695 – 8 December 1762) was an English barrister, judge and politician who sat in the House of Commons for 35 years from 1722 to 1757.

== Early life ==
Noel was the second son of Sir John Noel, 4th Baronet, of Kirkby Mallory, Leicestershire, and his wife Mary Clobery, youngest daughter and co-heiress of Sir John Clobery of Bradstone, Devon, and was born on 19 March 1695 at Kirkby Mallory, Sparkenhoe Hundred, Leicestershire. His older brother was Sir Clobery Noel, 5th Baronet. William Noel was educated at Lichfield grammar school in Staffordshire, under the Rev. John Hunter, and having been admitted a member of the Inner Temple on 12 February 1716, was called to the bar on 25 June 1721.

== Career ==
At a by-election on 24 October 1722, Noel was returned to the House of Commons as Member of Parliament for Stamford, on the interest of the 8th Earl of Exeter, from whom he received a yearly pension for dealing with his accounts. He was returned again in a contest at the 1727 British general election. He acted with the Opposition speaking against the Hessians in 1731, and against the army in 1732. In December 1731, with Nicholas Fazakerley and Thomas Bootle, he defended Richard Francklin, a bookseller who was tried before Chief-justice Lord Raymond for publishing a libel in The Craftsman.

At the 1734 British general election he was returned again in a contest for Stamford. He became deputy-recorder of Stamford in 1736, and in 1738 became a king's counsel and a bencher of the Inner Temple (28 April). In Parliament, he spoke for the allowance to the Prince of Wales in 1737 and withdrew on the motion for the removal of Walpole in February 1741. He was returned unopposed at the 1741 British general election. In March 1742 he was elected to the secret committee on Walpole, his name appearing in both the court and the opposition lists. He went over to the Government, and voted inconsistently, both for and against the Hanoverians over the following years. On 11 December 1746 he was appointed a member of the committee for preparing the articles of impeachment against the Jacobite Simon Fraser, 11th Lord Lovat, and during the trial in March 1747 replied to objections which Lovat had raised in his defence.

At the 1747 British general election Noel was returned as MP for West Looe, Cornwall, on the government interest and was returned again on appointment to office as chief justice of Chester on 25 October 1749. He was again returned for West Looe at the 1754 British general election. Through Lord Hardwicke's influence Noel succeeded Thomas Birch as a justice of the common pleas in March 1757, when he retired from parliament, but retained his post in Chester. On the accession of his nephew Sir Edward Noel, 6th Baronet to the barony of Wentworth in 1745, Noel assumed the courtesy title "The Honourable". He was described by Horace Walpole as "a pompous man of little solidity", and was held up to ridicule in The Causidicade, an anonymous satire.

== Family ==
Noel married Elizabeth Trollope, third daughter of Sir Thomas Trollope, 3rd Baronet of Casewick, Lincolnshire. The couple had four daughters:

1. Susannah Maria, who became the second wife of Thomas Hill of Tern Hall, Shropshire, and died on 14 February 1760, aged 41. Their son Noel Hill was created Baron Berwick on 19 May 1784.
2. Anne, who died unmarried.
3. Frances, who married Bennet Sherard, 3rd Earl of Harborough, on 3 July 1757, and died on 13 September 1760.
4. Elizabeth.

Noel died on 8 December 1762.

== Notes ==
Parliament of Great Britain
Preceded by Hon. Brownlow Cecil; Charles Bertie	Member of Parliament for Stamford; 1722–1747; With: Charles Bertie 1722–1727; Robert Shirley 1727–1734; John Proby 1734–1747	Succeeded by John Proby, junior Lord Burghley
Preceded by Benjamin Keene; John Frederick	Member of Parliament for West Looe; 1747 –1757; With: John Frederick	Succeeded by William Trelawny; John Frederick

Attribution

This article incorporates text from a publication now in the public domain: Lee, Sidney, ed. (1895). "Noel, William". Dictionary of National Biography. Vol. 41. London: Smith, Elder & Co.
