= John Proby (died 1762) =

Arms of Proby: Ermine, on a fess gules a lion passant or

John Proby (c. 1698 – 15 March 1762) was an English Member of Parliament for Huntingdonshire (1722–27) and Stamford (1743–47).

== Life ==
Proby was the son of William Proby of Elton Hall, Huntingdonshire and formerly of Fort St George, Madras, who was son of Charles Proby, and a remote heir of Sir Peter Proby through his cousin John Proby. John Proby died in 1710, then his daughter Frances in 1711, and William Proby inherited. He was also heir to his paternal grandfather, Emmanuel Proby who was the fourth son of Sir Peter Proby.

Charles Proby was a close ally of Sir Edward Winter in the power struggles in Madras of the 1660s. He predeceased Dorothy his wife, who died in 1685; he is said to have been living in 1684. He had another son, Charles, who became rector of Tewin, and there was a daughter, Elizabeth, who married Gabriel Roberts at Fort St. George in 1687.

William Proby went to Fort St George, Madras as an employee of the East India Company, and was a writer there in 1683. He was secretary of the Council there in 1688, under Elihu Yale as President. In 1702 he moved to Surat, where he was second on the Council. He served in that capacity for about a decade, under Nicholas Waite, Ephraim Bendall and William Aislabie. According to Inscriptions on Tombs or Monuments in Madras, William Proby was discharged by the Company.

== Family background ==
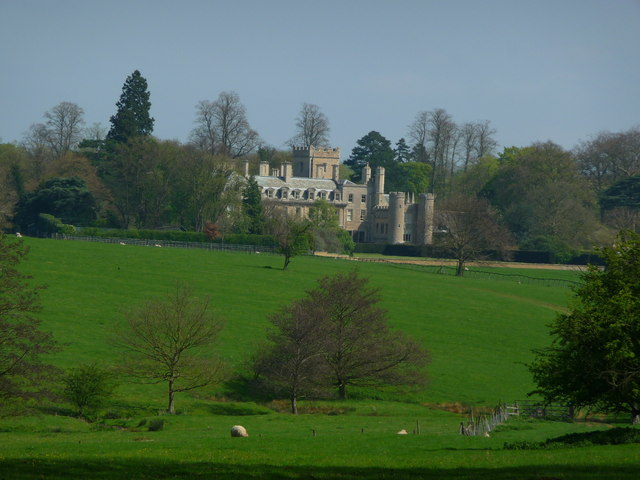
Elton Hall, Cambridgeshire

There is conflicting information about William Proby and his family. His mother, Dorothy (née Torriano), went on to marry Thomas Lucas, and died in 1685 in Madras. According to one source, William married Frances Gray (née English, widow of Thomas Gray) in 1693, and had two children with her, John and Editha. The children returned with him to England. Editha married Sir John Osborne, 7th Baronet, with whom she had six sons and four daughters, and died in 1745.

William Proby is also recorded as married to Henrietta, daughter of Robert Cornewall, and Henrietta is given as mother of John Proby. The family seat was Elton Hall, then in Huntingdonshire. The Proby inheritance also included the manor of Ranes (Raans, Raynes, Amersham) in Buckinghamshire; it was sold in 1735. William Proby was High Sheriff of Buckinghamshire in 1719. John Proby succeeded his father William in 1739.

== Career ==
Proby was admitted to Jesus College, Cambridge in 1715. He was elected to the House of Commons for Huntingdonshire in 1722, a seat he held until 1727, and later represented Stamford from 1734 to 1747.

Proby died in March 1762.

== Personal life ==
Proby married the Hon. Jane Leveson-Gower, daughter of John Leveson-Gower, 1st Baron Gower, in 1719. They had five sons and one daughter:

- John Proby (1720–1772), succeeded his father as Member of Parliament for Stamford and was elevated to the peerage as Baron Carysfort
- William Proby
- Thomas Proby (1723 – 8 July 1758), killed at Fort Ticonderoga in the Battle of Carillon
- Capt. Charles Proby (1725–1799) RN
- Baptist Proby (d. 1807), became Dean of Lichfield

Jane Proby died in 1726.

Parliament of Great Britain
Preceded by John Bigg; Viscount Hinchingbrooke	Member of Parliament for Huntingdonshire; 1722–1727; With: John Bigg	Succeeded by John Bigg; Marquess of Hartington
Preceded by William Noel; Robert Shirley	Member of Parliament for Stamford; 1734–1747; With: William Noel	Succeeded by Lord Burghley; John Proby
