= Edward Montagu, 3rd Earl of Sandwich =

English Earl (1670–1729)

The Right Honourable The Earl of Sandwich
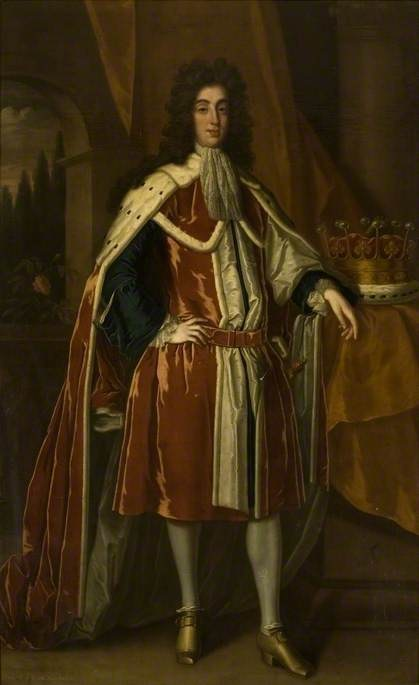
- Born: 10 April 1670
- Died: 20 October 1729 (aged 59)
- Spouse: Elizabeth Montagu, Countess of Sandwich
- Issue: 2, including Edward Montagu, Viscount Hinchingbrooke
- Father: Edward Montagu, 2nd Earl of Sandwich
- Mother: Lady Anne Boyle

Edward Montagu, 3rd Earl of Sandwich (10 April 1670 – 20 October 1729) was born in Burlington House, London, England to Edward Montagu, 2nd Earl of Sandwich and Lady Ann Boyle. He was styled Viscount Hinchingbrooke from 1672 until his accession to the earldom in 1688. On the accession of Queen Anne, Sandwich was appointed Master of the Horse to her husband, Prince George of Denmark, despite strong objections from the royal favorite Sarah Churchill, who wanted the office for one of her own family.

Sandwich was generally regarded by his contemporaries as insane: his wife so far as possible kept him "close confined" at Hinchingbrooke and entrusted the management of the family estates to their son, as soon as he was old enough to take charge. From 1704 at the latest the Queen came under intense pressure to dismiss him from his office of Master of the Horse; she followed her frequent policy of temporizing, writing that she thought that "he was not as ill as he was said to be". In 1705 however, Sandwich's mental illness became so obvious that he was obliged to resign his office and lived for more than twenty years in retirement until his death in 1729.

== Marriage and Children ==
=== Marriage ===
On 11 July 1689, he married Elizabeth Wilmot, daughter of John Wilmot, 2nd Earl of Rochester and Elizabeth Malet.

=== Children ===
Together, Edward and Elizabeth had two children. Lady Elizabeth Montagu, who died as an infant, and Edward Richard Montagu (7 July 1692 – 3 October 1722), who predeceased his father.

Peerage of England
Preceded by Edward Montagu	Earl of Sandwich; 1688–1729	Succeeded by John Montagu
