= Charles Bertie (died 1730) =

British politician

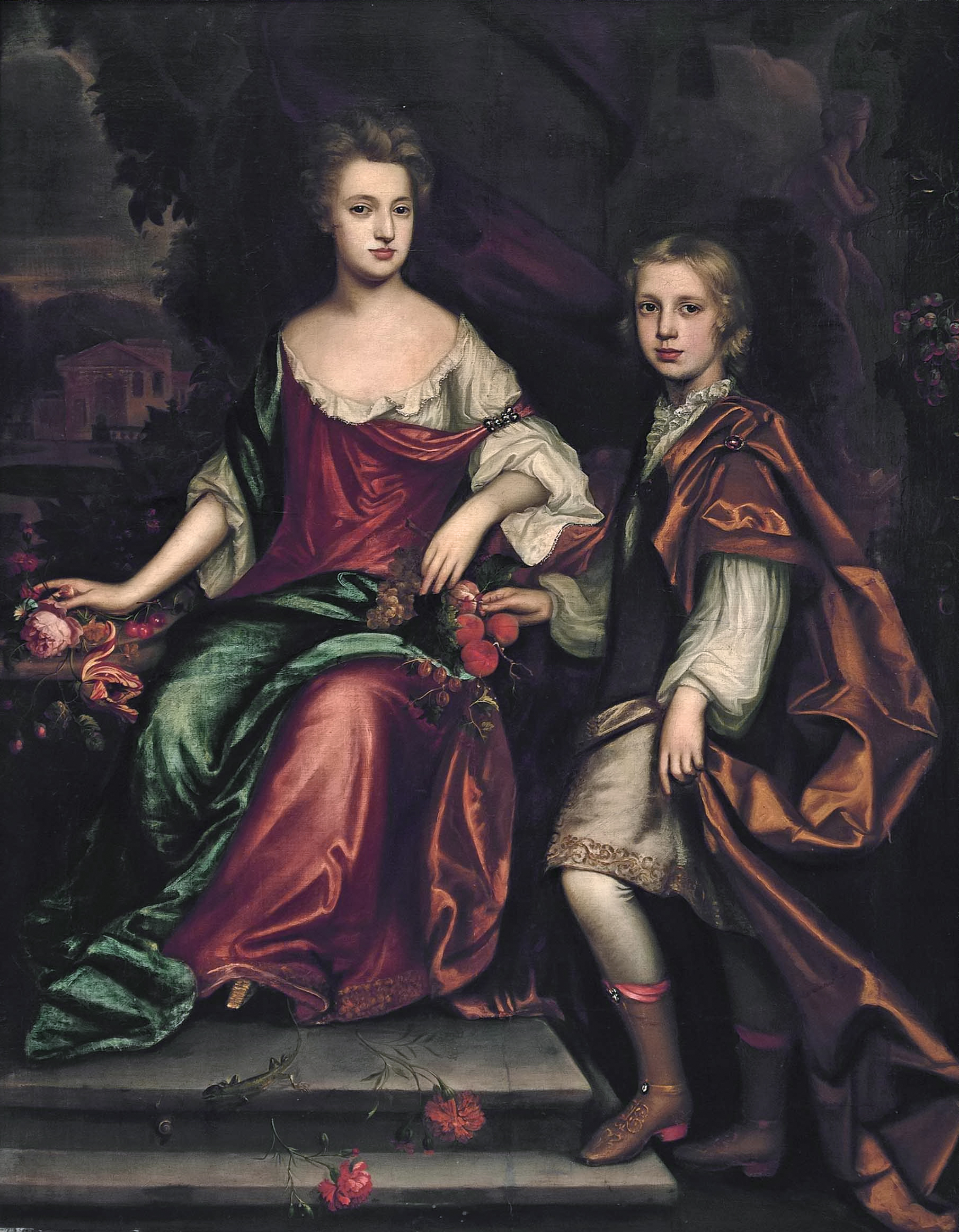
Charles and his sister Elizabeth Bertie, later Lady Fitzwalter (circle of Thomas Murray)

Charles Bertie (c.1678 – 12 April 1730) of Uffington, near Stamford, Lincolnshire was a British politician who sat in the House of Commons from 1711 to 1727.

== Early life ==
Bertie was the only surviving son of Charles Bertie and his wife Mary Tryon, daughter of Peter Tryon of Harringworth, Northamptonshire. His grandfather was Montagu Bertie, 2nd Earl of Lindsey. In 1704, he married Mary Norborne, daughter of John Norborne of Great Stukeley.

== Political career ==
Bertie became a freeholder of Northamptonshire in 1702 and took part in political activities supporting the county Tories under the guidance of his father. His father died in 1711 and in the ensuing by-election on 2 April 1711 Bertie succeeded him as Member of Parliament for Stamford on the family interest. He generally supported the Tories, but voted with his cousin, Lord Abingdon, against the French commerce bill in 1713. He was returned unopposed as MP for Stamford at the 1713 general election and at the 1715 general election. He was in opposition to the Townshend ministry, and voted against the Septennial Act in 1716. He made little contribution in Parliament and was returned unopposed in 1722. At the 1727 election, his rival for political influence at Stamford, Lord Exeter, successfully ousted Bertie and returned his own candidates for both seats.

== Death and legacy ==
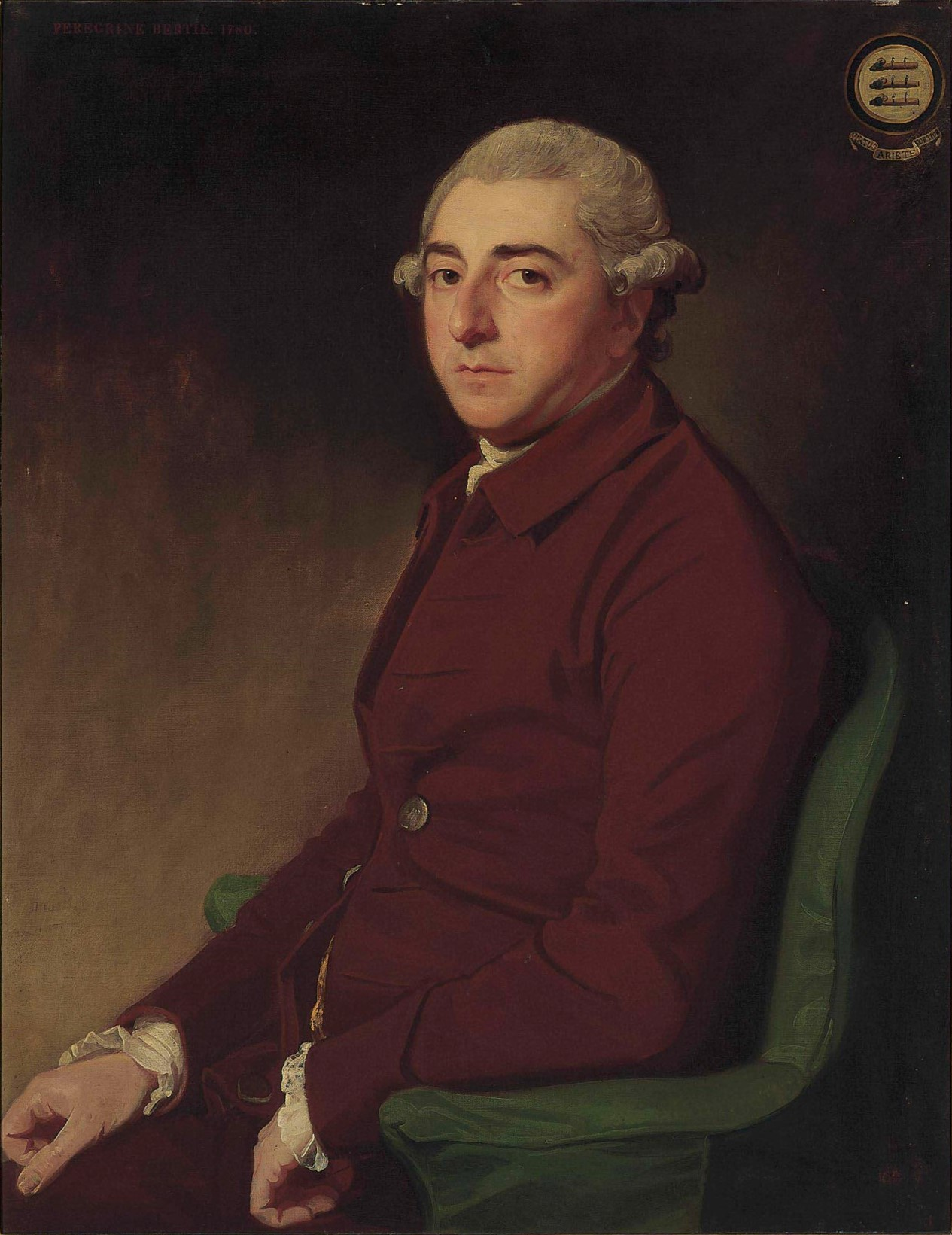
Peregrine Bertie (1709-1779), painting by George Romney, 1777-1778.

Bertie died on 12 April 1730. He had four children:

- Charles Bertie (13 February 1706/7 – 26 April 1784), married Bathsheba Mead, daughter of Richard Mead; had five sons and one daughter, Charles (d. 1780), Richard, James, Rev. Montague (1737–1778), Vere (d. 1747), and Bathsheba (d. 1749), all of whom died without issue
- Rev. Norborne Bertie (d. 5 November 1779), no issue
- Peregrine Bertie (1709–1777), married Elizabeth Payne in 1736, had several children including Albemarle Bertie, 9th Earl of Lindsey
- Susan Bertie, married Edward Hales, second son of Sir Edward Hales, 3rd Baronet

He was succeeded by his son Charles; he also left substantial legacies to his younger children.

Parliament of Great Britain
Preceded by Charles Bertie; Charles Cecil	Member of Parliament for Stamford; 1711–1727; With: Charles Cecil 1711–22; Brownlow Cecil 1722; William Noel 1722–27	Succeeded by William Noel; Robert Shirley
