= John Wilmot, 2nd Earl of Rochester =

English poet and courtier (1647–1680)

The Right Honourable The Earl of Rochester
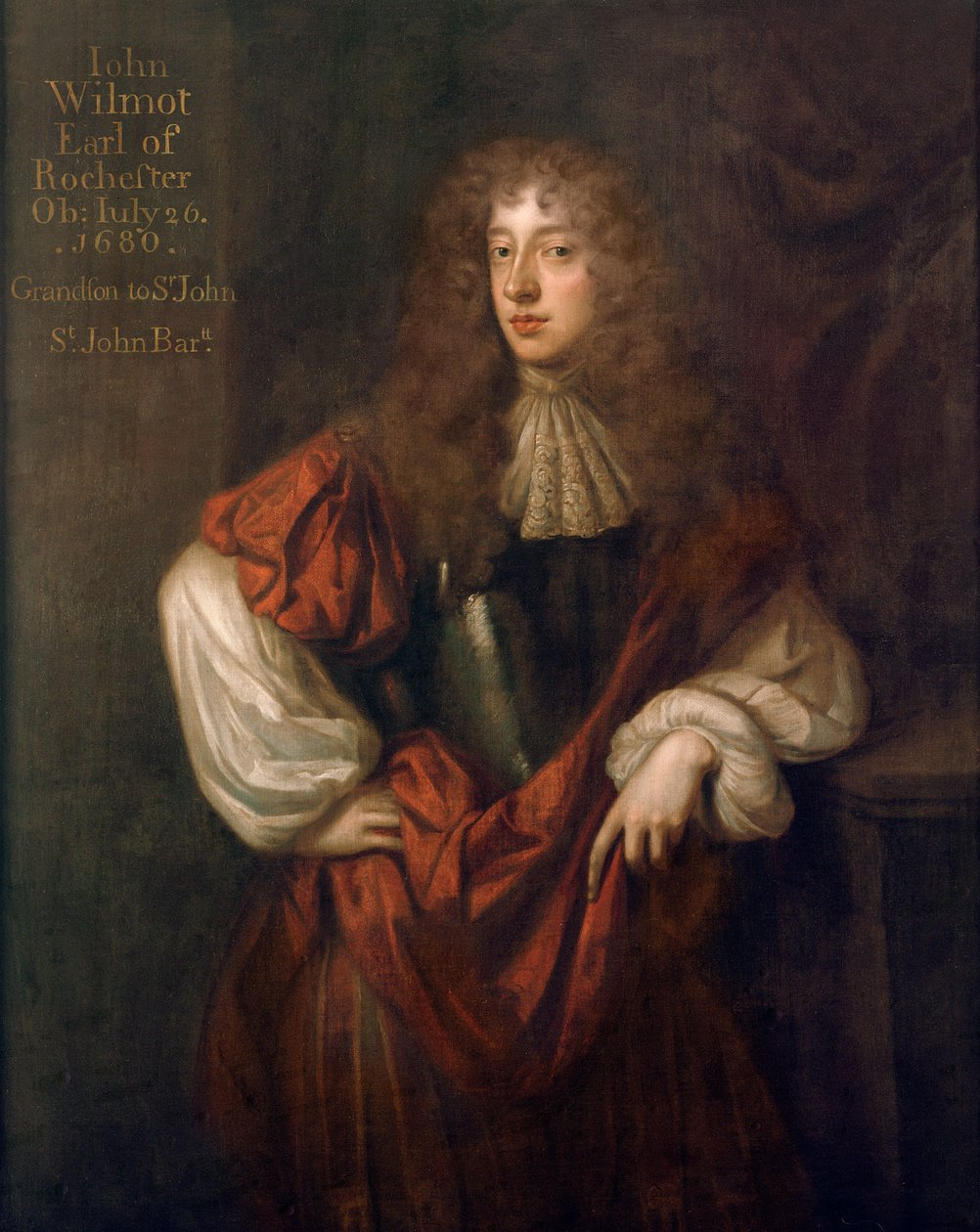
- 1677 portrait
- Born: 1 April 1647; Ditchley, Oxfordshire, England
- Died: 26 July 1680 (aged 33); Woodstock, Oxfordshire, England
- Cause of death: Believed to be complications from syphilis
- Resting place: Spelsbury, Oxfordshire, England
- Education: Wadham College; University of Oxford
- Notable work: A Satyr Against Reason and Mankind; A Letter From Artemesia; An Allusion to Horace; A Ramble in St James' Park; The Imperfect Enjoyment
- Style: 2nd Earl of Rochester, 2nd Baron Wilmot of Adderbury, 3rd Viscount of Athlone (peerage of Ireland)
- Spouse: Elizabeth Malet
- Children: Charles Wilmot, 3rd Earl of Rochester (1671–1681); Lady Anne Greville; Elizabeth Montagu, Countess of Sandwich; Malet Vaughan, Viscountess Lisburne; Elizabeth (illegitimate daughter from Mrs Elizabeth Barry)
- Parents: Henry Wilmot, 1st Earl of Rochester; Anne St. John

John Wilmot, 2nd Earl of Rochester (2 April 1647 (O.S.) – 26 July 1680 (O.S.)) was an English poet and courtier of King Charles II's Restoration court, who reacted against the "spiritual authoritarianism" of the Puritan era. Rochester embodied a novel rebellion against the puritan programme, and he became as well known for his rakish lifestyle as for his poetry, although the two were often interlinked. He died as a result of a sexually transmitted infection at the age of 33.

Rochester was described by his contemporary Andrew Marvell as "the best English satirist", and he is generally considered to be the most considerable poet and the most learned among the Restoration wits. His poetry was widely censored during the Victorian era, but enjoyed a revival from the 1920s onwards, with reappraisals from noted literary figures such as Graham Greene and Ezra Pound. The critic Vivian de Sola Pinto linked Rochester's libertinism to Hobbesian materialism.

During his lifetime Rochester was best known for A Satyr Against Reason and Mankind and it remains among his best-known works today.

== Life ==
=== Upbringing and teens ===
John Wilmot was born at Ditchley House in Oxfordshire on 1 April 1647. His father, Henry, Viscount Wilmot, was created Earl of Rochester in 1652 for his military service to Charles II during the King's exile under the Commonwealth. Paul Davis describes Henry as "a Cavalier legend, a dashing bon vivant and war-hero who single-handedly engineered the future Charles II's escape to the Continent (including the famous concealment in an oak tree) after the disastrous battle of Worcester in 1651". His mother, Anne St. John, was a strong-willed Puritan from a noble Wiltshire family.

From the age of seven, Rochester was privately tutored, two years later attending the grammar school in nearby Burford. His father died in 1658, and John Wilmot inherited the title of the Earl of Rochester in April of that year. In January 1660, Rochester was admitted as a Fellow commoner to Wadham College, Oxford, a new and comparatively poor college. Whilst there, it is said, the 13-year-old "grew debauched". In September 1661 he was awarded an honorary M.A. by the newly elected chancellor of the university, Edward Hyde, Earl of Clarendon, a family friend.

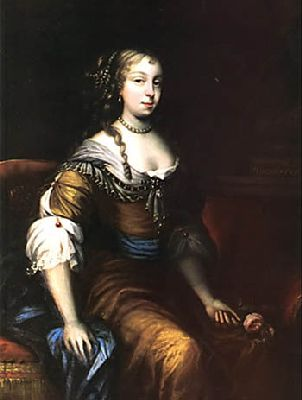
Elizabeth Wilmot (Malet) by Peter Lely

As an act of gratitude towards the son of Henry Wilmot, Charles II conferred on Rochester an annual pension of £500. In November 1661 Charles sent Rochester on a three-year Grand Tour of France and Italy, and appointed the physician Andrew Balfour as his governor. This exposed him to an unusual degree to European (especially French) writing and thought. In 1664 Rochester returned to London, and made his formal début at the Restoration court on Christmas Day.

It has been suggested by a number of scholars that the King took a paternal role in Rochester's life. Charles II suggested a marriage between Rochester and the wealthy heiress Elizabeth Malet. Her relatives opposed marriage to the impoverished Rochester, who conspired with his mother to abduct Elizabeth. Samuel Pepys described the attempted abduction in his diary on 28 May 1665:

Thence to my Lady Sandwich's, where, to my shame, I had not been a great while before. Here, [I told] her a story of my Lord Rochester's running away on Friday night last with Mrs. Mallett, the great beauty and fortune of the North, who had supped at White Hall with Mrs. Stewart, and was going home to her lodgings with her grandfather, my Lord Haly, by coach; and was at Charing Cross seized on by both horse and foot men, and forcibly taken from him, and put into a coach with six horses, and two women provided to receive her, and carried away. Upon immediate pursuit, my Lord of Rochester (for whom the King had spoke to the lady often, but with no successe [sic]) was taken at Uxbridge; but the lady is not yet heard of, and the King mighty angry, and the Lord sent to the Tower.

18-year-old Rochester spent three weeks in the Tower, and was released only after he wrote a penitent apology to the King.

Rochester attempted to redeem himself by volunteering for the navy in the Second Dutch War in the winter of 1665, serving under the Earl of Sandwich. His courage at the Battle of Vågen, serving on board the ship of Thomas Teddeman, made him a war hero. Pleased with his conduct, Charles appointed Rochester a Gentleman of the Bedchamber in March 1666, which granted him prime lodgings in Whitehall and a pension of £1,000 a year. The role encompassed, one week in every four, Rochester helping the King to dress and undress, serve his meals when dining in private, and sleeping at the foot of the King's bed. In the summer of 1666, Rochester returned to sea, serving aboard HMS Victory under Edward Spragge. He again showed extraordinary courage in battle, including rowing between vessels under heavy cannon fire, to deliver Spragge's messages around the fleet.

Upon returning from sea, Rochester resumed his courtship of Elizabeth Malet. Defying her family's wishes, Malet eloped with Rochester again in January 1667, and they were married at the Knightsbridge chapel. They had four children: Lady Anne Wilmot (1669–1703), Charles Wilmot (1671–1681), Lady Elizabeth Wilmot (1674–1757) and Lady Malet Wilmot (1676–1708/1709).

In October 1667, the monarch granted Rochester special licence to enter the House of Lords early, despite his being seven months underage. The act was an attempt by the King to bolster his number of supporters among the Lords.

Teenage actress Nell Gwyn "almost certainly" took him as her lover; she was later to become the mistress of Charles II. Gwyn remained a lifelong friend and political associate, and her relationship with the King gave Rochester influence and status within the Court.

=== Twenties and last years ===
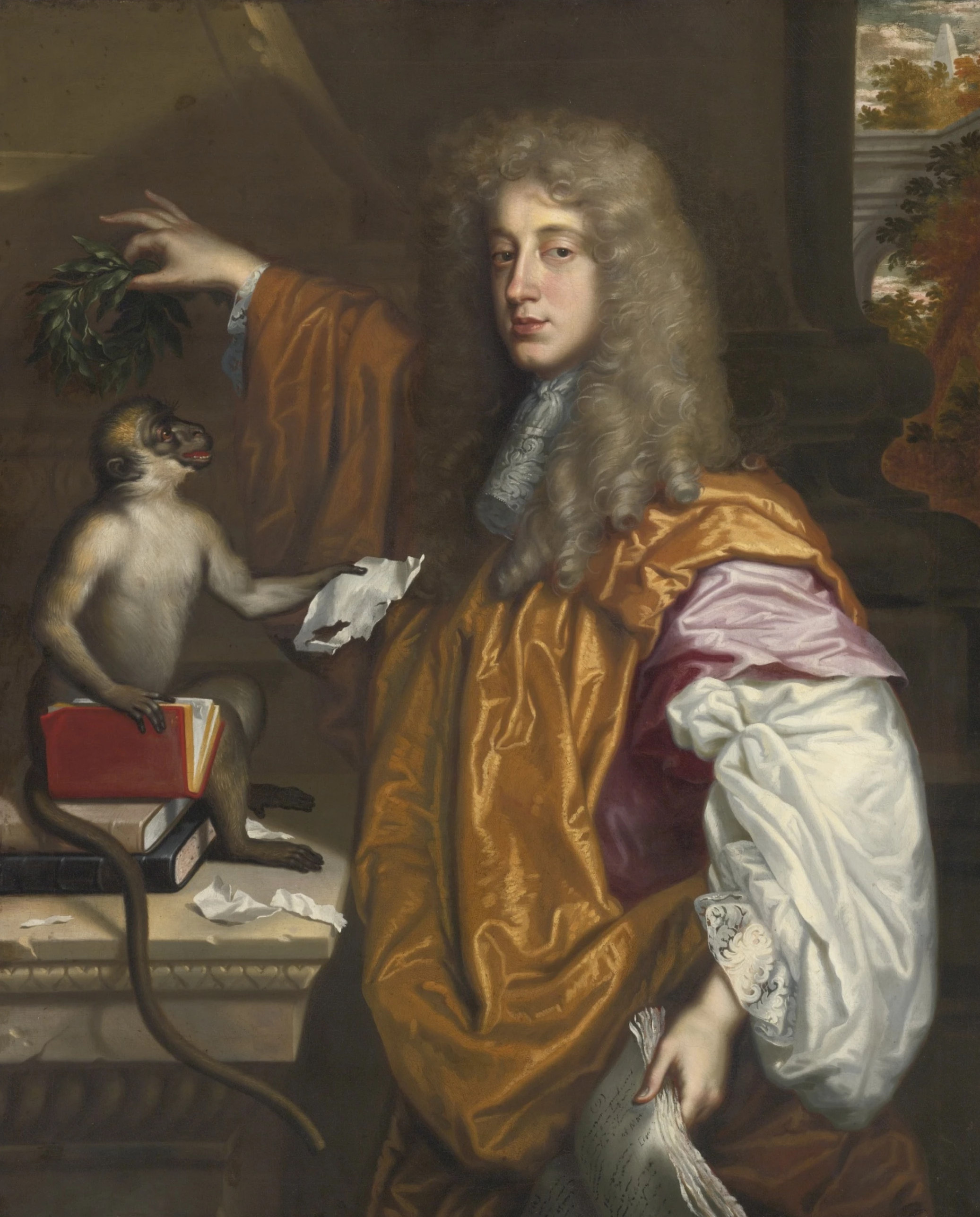
c. 1665–1670 portrait of Rochester by Jacob Huysmans

Rochester's life was divided between domesticity in the country and a riotous existence at court, where he was renowned for drunkenness, vivacious conversation, and "extravagant frolics" as part of the Merry Gang (as Andrew Marvell described them). The Merry Gang flourished for about 15 years after 1665 and included Henry Jermyn; Charles Sackville, Earl of Dorset; John Sheffield, Earl of Mulgrave; Henry Killigrew; Sir Charles Sedley; the playwrights William Wycherley and George Etherege; and George Villiers, 2nd Duke of Buckingham. Gilbert Burnet wrote of him that, "For five years together he was continually Drunk ... [and] not ... perfectly Master of himself ... [which] led him to ... do many wild and unaccountable things." Pepys's Diary records one such occasion on 16 February 1669 when Rochester was invited to dine with the King and the Dutch ambassador:

The King dining yesterday at the Dutch ambassador's, after dinner they drank and were pretty merry; and among the rest of the King's company there was that worthy fellow my Lord of Rochester, and Tom Killigrew, whose mirth and raillery offended the former so much that he did give Tom Killigrew a box on the ear in the King's presence, which do give much offence to the people here at Court ...

His actions were considered an offence against the King, or a lèse-majesté, and he was banned from the court, although the King soon called for his return.

In 1673, Rochester began to train Elizabeth Barry as an actress. She went on to become the most famous actress of her age. He took her as his mistress in 1675. The relationship lasted for around five years, and produced a daughter, before descending into acrimony after Rochester began to resent her success. Rochester wrote afterwards, "With what face can I incline/To damn you to be only mine? ... Live up to thy mighty mind/And be the mistress of mankind".

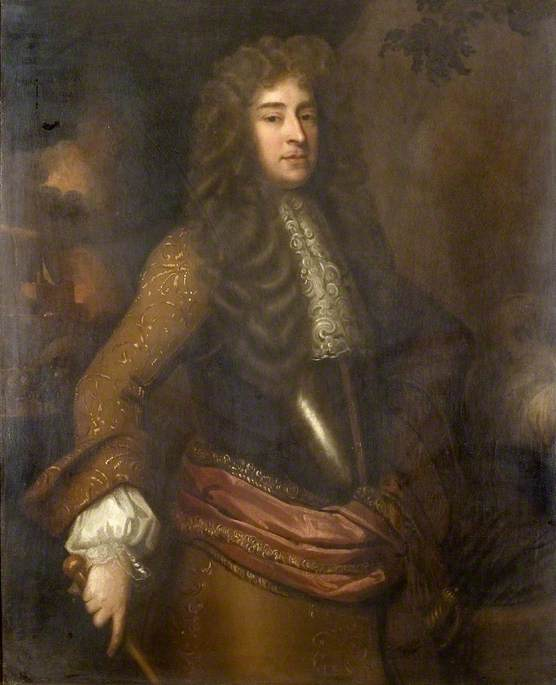
Portrait of Rochester by Sir Godfrey Kneller

When the King's advisor and friend of Rochester, the Duke of Buckingham, lost power in 1673, Rochester's standing fell as well. At the Christmas festivities at Whitehall of that year, Rochester delivered a satire to Charles II, "In the Isle of Britain" – which criticized the King for being obsessed with sex at the expense of his kingdom. Charles's reaction to this satirical portrayal resulted in Rochester's exile from the court until February. During this time Rochester dwelt at his estate in Adderbury. Despite this, in February 1674, after much petitioning by Rochester, the King appointed him Ranger of Woodstock Park.

In June 1675 "Lord Rochester in a frolick after a rant did ... beat downe the dyill (i.e. sundial) which stood in the middle of the Privie Garding, which was esteemed the rarest in Europ". John Aubrey learned what Rochester said on this occasion when he came in from his "revells" with Charles Sackville, Lord Buckhurst, and Fleetwood Sheppard to see the object: "'What ... doest thou stand here to fuck time?' Dash they fell to worke". It has been speculated that the comment refers not to the dial itself, which was not phallic in appearance, but a painting of the King next to the dial that featured his phallic sceptre. Rochester fled the court again.

Rochester fell into disfavour again in 1676. During a late-night scuffle with the night watch, one of Rochester's companions, Roger Downes, was killed by a pike-thrust. Rochester was reported to have fled the scene of the incident, and his standing with the monarch reached an all-time low. Following this incident, Rochester briefly fled to Tower Hill, where he impersonated a mountebank "Doctor Bendo". Under this persona, he claimed skill in treating "barrenness" (infertility), and other gynaecological disorders. Gilbert Burnet wryly noted that Rochester's practice was "not without success", implying his intercession of himself as a surreptitious sperm donor. On occasion, Rochester also assumed the role of the grave and matronly Mrs. Bendo, presumably so that he could inspect young women privately without arousing their husbands' suspicions.

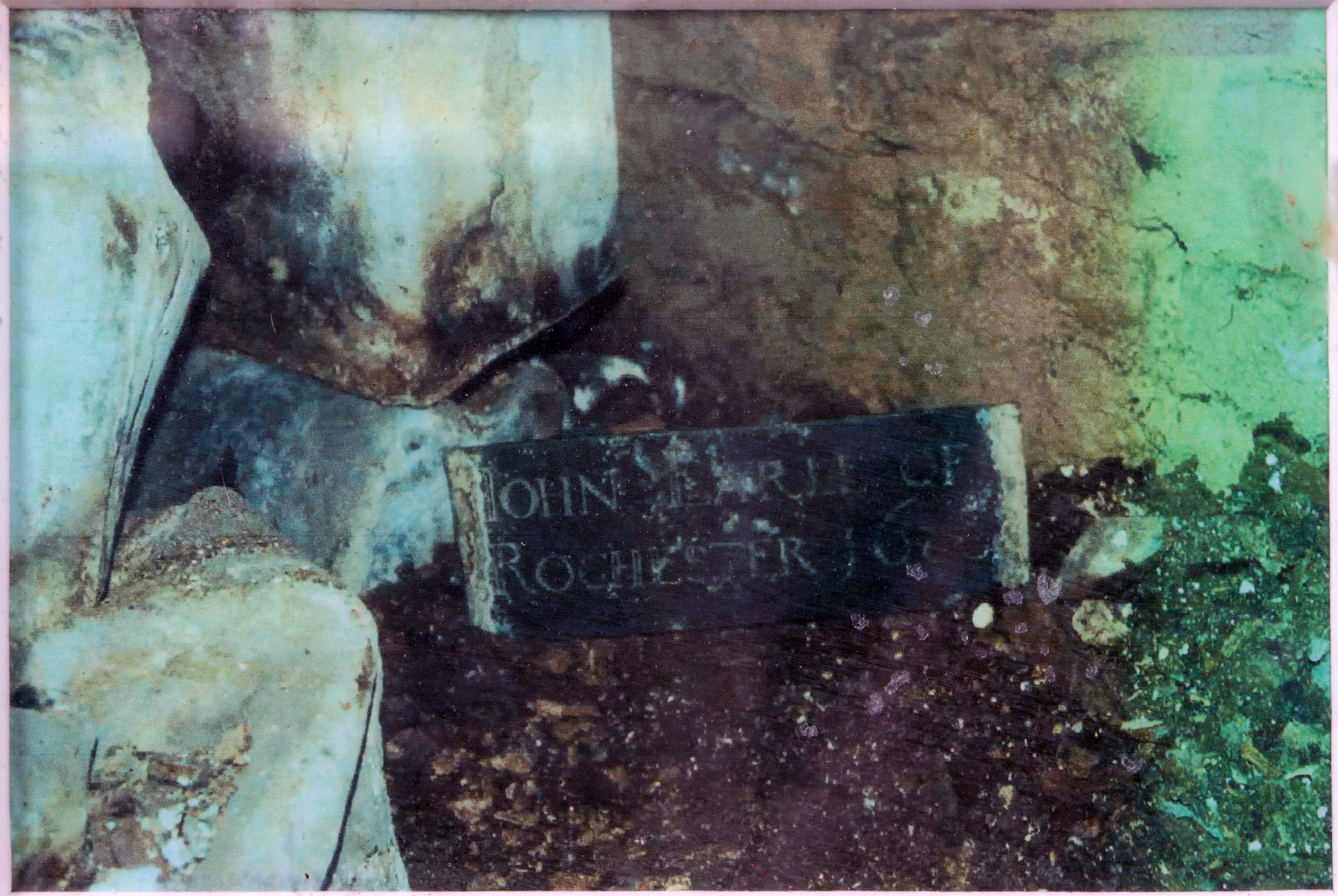
The coffin of John Wilmot, 2nd Earl of Rochester, in its vault in Spelsbury church, Oxfordshire

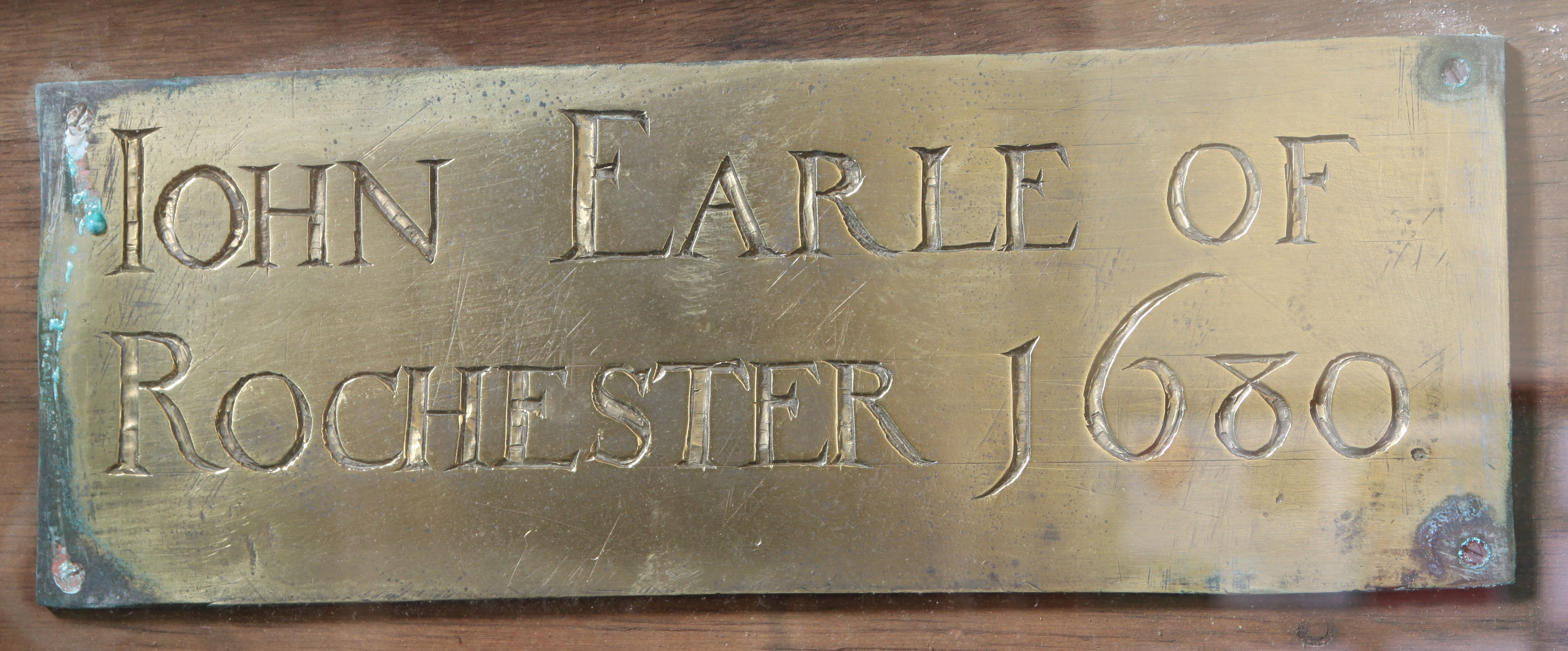
The coffin plate removed from Rochester's coffin

=== Death ===
By the age of 33, Rochester was dying from what is usually described as the effects of tertiary syphilis, gonorrohea, or other venereal diseases, combined with the effects of alcoholism. Carol Richards has disputed this, arguing that it is more likely that he died of renal failure due to chronic nephritis (Bright's disease). His mother arranged for him to be attended in his final weeks by her religious associates, particularly Gilbert Burnet, later Bishop of Salisbury.

After hearing of Burnet's departure from his side, Rochester muttered his last words: "Has my friend left me? Then I shall die shortly". In the early morning of 26 July 1680, Rochester died "without a shudder or a sound". He was buried at Spelsbury church in Oxfordshire.

A deathbed renunciation of libertinism and conversion to Anglican Christianity, Some Passages of the Life and Death of the Honourable John Wilmot Earl of Rochester, was published by Reverend Burnet. Because this account appears in Burnet's own writings, its accuracy has been disputed by some scholars, who accuse Burnet of having shaped the account of Rochester's denunciation of libertinism to enhance his own reputation. On the other hand, Graham Greene, in his biography of Wilmot, calls Burnet's book "convincing".

== Issue ==
By his wife, Elizabeth Malet, Rochester had four children:

1. Charles Wilmot, 3rd Earl of Rochester (christened 2 January 1670/71 – 12 November 1681)
2. Lady Anne Wilmot (christened 30 August 1669 – 8 August 1703) married firstly Henry Bayntun, Esq., a country gentleman, by whom she had issue one son and one daughter Anne Bayntun (mother of Sir Edward Bayntun-Rolt, 1st Baronet). She married secondly the poet Hon. Francis Greville, MP (1 July 1667 – 11 October 1710), eldest son of Fulke Greville, 5th Baron Brooke of Beauchamps Court, and had two sons, the 6th and 7th Barons Brooke; the 7th Baron was father of Francis Greville, 1st Earl of Warwick.
3. Lady Elizabeth Wilmot (christened 13 July 1674 – 1 July 1757); she married 8 July 1689 Edward Montagu, 3rd Earl of Sandwich (10 April 1670 – 20 October 1729), and had issue, one daughter (who died young) and one son Edward Montagu, Viscount Hinchingbrooke, father of John Montagu, 4th Earl of Sandwich (for whom the sandwich is named). She became renowned for her learning and wit.
4. Lady Malet Wilmot (christened 6 January 1676 – 13 January 1708/9) married John Vaughan, 1st Viscount Lisburne on 18 August 1692; their son was Wilmot Vaughan, 3rd Viscount Lisburne, father of Wilmot Vaughan, 1st Earl of Lisburne, ancestor of the present Earl.

== Works ==
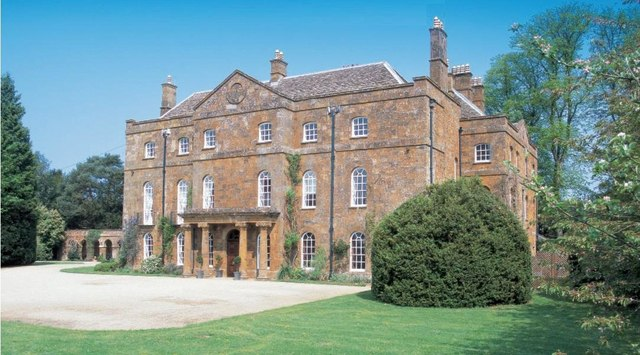
Rochester's manor house in Adderbury, Oxfordshire

Rochester's poetic work varies widely in form, genre, and content. He was part of a "mob of gentlemen who wrote with ease", who continued to produce their poetry in manuscripts, rather than in publication. As a consequence, some of Rochester's work deals with topical concerns, such as satires of courtly affairs in libels, to parodies of the styles of his contemporaries, such as Sir Carr Scrope. He is also notable for his impromptus, one of which is a teasing epigram on King Charles II:

We have a pretty witty king,
Whose word no man relies on.
He never said a foolish thing,
And never did a wise one.

To which Charles supposedly replied, "That's true, for my words are my own, but my actions are those of my ministers".

Rochester's poetry displays a range of learning and influences. These included imitations of Malherbe, Ronsard, and Boileau. He also translated or adapted from classical authors such as Petronius, Lucretius, Ovid, Anacreon, Horace, and Seneca.

Rochester's writings were at once admired and infamous. A Satyr Against Mankind (1675), one of the few poems he published (in a broadside in 1679), is a scathing denunciation of rationalism and optimism that contrasts human perfidy with animal wisdom.

The majority of his poetry was not published under his name until after his death. Because most of his poems circulated only in manuscript form during his lifetime, it is likely that much of his writing did not survive. Burnet claimed that Rochester's conversion experience led him to ask that "all his profane and lewd writings" be burned; it is unclear how much, if any, of Rochester's writing was destroyed.

Rochester was also interested in the theatre. In addition to an interest in actresses, he wrote an adaptation of Fletcher's Valentinian (1685), a scene for Sir Robert Howard's The Conquest of China, a prologue to Elkanah Settle's The Empress of Morocco (1673), and epilogues to Sir Francis Fane's Love in the Dark (1675), Charles Davenant's Circe, a Tragedy (1677). The best-known dramatic work attributed to Rochester, Sodom, or the Quintessence of Debauchery, has never been successfully proven to be written by him. Posthumous printings of Sodom, however, gave rise to prosecutions for obscenity, and were destroyed. On 16 December 2004 one of the few surviving copies of Sodom was sold by Sotheby's for £45,600.

"[Rochester's] letters to his wife and to his friend Henry Savile ... show an admirable mastery of easy, colloquial prose."

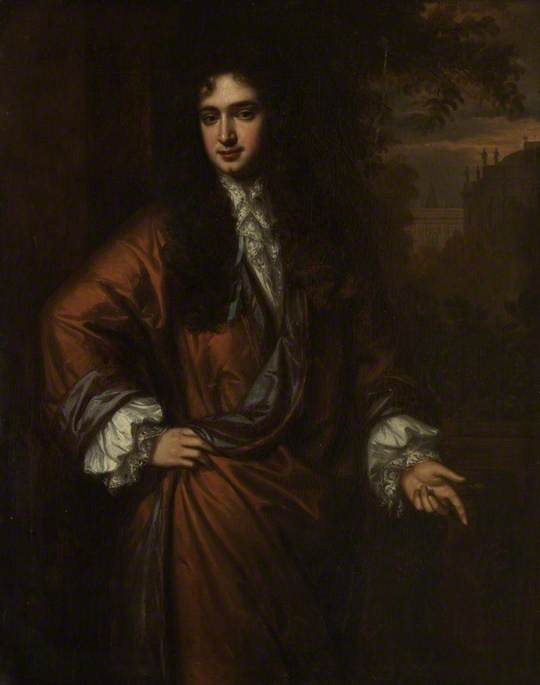
Portrait of John Wilmot by Sir Peter Lely, Dillington House

Scholarship has identified approximately 75 authentic Rochester poems. Three major critical editions of Rochester in the twentieth century have taken very different approaches to authenticating and organising his canon. David Vieth's 1962 edition adopts a heavily biographical organisation, modernising spellings and heading the sections of his book "Prentice Work", "Early Maturity", "Tragic Maturity", and "Disillusionment and Death". Keith Walker's 1984 edition takes a genre-based approach, returning to the older spellings and accidentals in an effort to present documents closer to those a seventeenth-century audience would have received. Harold Love's Oxford University Press edition of 1999, now the scholarly standard, notes the variorum history conscientiously, but arranges works in genre sections ordered from the private to the public.

== Reception and influence ==
Rochester was the model for a number of rake heroes in plays of the period, such as Don John in Thomas Shadwell's The Libertine (1675) and Dorimant in George Etherege's The Man of Mode (1676). Meanwhile he was eulogised by his contemporaries such as Aphra Behn and Andrew Marvell, who described him as "the only man in England that had the true vein of satire". Daniel Defoe quoted him in Moll Flanders, and discussed him in other works. Voltaire, who spoke of Rochester as "the man of genius, the great poet", admired his satire for its "energy and fire" and translated some lines into French to "display the shining imagination his lordship only could boast".

By the 1750s, Rochester's reputation suffered as the liberality of the Restoration era subsided; Samuel Johnson characterised him as a worthless and dissolute rake. Horace Walpole described him as "a man whom the muses were fond to inspire but ashamed to avow". Despite this general disdain for Rochester, William Hazlitt commented that his "verses cut and sparkle like diamonds" while his "epigrams were the bitterest, the least laboured, and the truest, that ever were written". Referring to Rochester's perspective, Hazlitt wrote that "his contempt for everything that others respect almost amounts to sublimity". Meanwhile, Goethe quoted A Satyr against Reason and Mankind in English in his Autobiography. Despite this, Rochester's work was largely ignored throughout the Victorian era.

Rochester's reputation revived only in the 1920s. Ezra Pound, in his ABC of Reading, compared Rochester's poetry favourably to better-known figures such as Alexander Pope and John Milton. Graham Greene characterised Rochester as a "spoiled Puritan". Although F. R. Leavis argued that "Rochester is not a great poet of any kind", William Empson admired him. More recently, Germaine Greer has questioned the validity of the appraisal of Rochester as a drunken rake, and hailed the sensitivity of some of his lyrics.

Rochester was listed #6 in Time Out's "Top 30 chart of London's most erotic writers". Tom Morris, the associate director, of the National Theatre said, "Rochester reminds me of an unhinged poacher, moving noiselessly through the night and shooting every convention that moves. Bishop Burnett, who coached him to an implausible death-bed repentance, said that he was unable to express any feeling without oaths and obscenities. He seemed like a punk in a frock coat. But once the straw dolls have been slain, Rochester celebrates in a sexual landscape all of his own."

== In popular culture ==
A play, The Libertine (1994), was written by Stephen Jeffreys, and staged by the Royal Court Theatre. The 2004 film The Libertine, based on Jeffreys' play, starred Johnny Depp as Rochester, Samantha Morton as Elizabeth Barry, John Malkovich as King Charles II and Rosamund Pike as Elizabeth Malet. Michael Nyman set to music an excerpt of Rochester's poem "Signor Dildo" for the film.

The play The Ministry of Pleasure by Craig Baxter also dramatises Wilmot's life and was produced at the Latchmere Theatre, London in 2004.

Rochester is the central character in Anna Lieff Saxby's 1996 erotic novella, No Paradise but Pleasure.

The story of Lord Rochester's life in Susan Cooper-Bridgewater's historical fiction Of Ink, Wit and Intrigue – Lord Rochester in Chains of Quicksilver, 2014. ISBN 978-1783063-079

Nick Cave's 2004 song "There She Goes, My Beautiful World", from the album Abattoir Blues / The Lyre of Orpheus, includes the lines "John Wilmot penned his poetry / Riddled with the pox".

Germaine Greer published a piece called "Doomed to Sincerity" about the life of the Earl.

Peerage of England
Preceded by Henry Wilmot	Earl of Rochester; 1658–1680	Succeeded by Charles Wilmot
