= Robert Pigott (MP) =

British Member of Parliament (1665–1746)

Robert Pigott (1665–1746), of Chetwynd, Shropshire and Chesterton, Huntingdonshire, was an English landowner and Whig politician who sat in the House of Commons between 1713 and 1741.

== Early life ==
Pigott was baptized on 24 October 1665, the eldest son of Walter Pigott of Chetwynd and his second wife Anne Dryden, daughter of Sir John Dryden, 2nd Baronet of Canons Ashby, Northamptonshire. He succeeded his father at Chetwynd in 1669. He matriculated at Christ Church, Oxford on 5 December 1681, aged 16, and was admitted at Inner Temple in 1683. By a marriage settlement dated 15 May 1695, he married Frances Ward, daughter of Hon. William Ward of Willingsworth Hall, Sedgeley, Staffordshire.

== Career ==
Pigott served as High Sheriff of Shropshire for the year 1696 to 1697, and also became a deputy-lieutenant for Shropshire. He succeeded to the Huntingdonshire estates of his uncles John Dryden in 1708 and Erasmus Dryden at Chesterton in 1710. With his landed wealth, he became High Sheriff of Cambridgeshire and Huntingdonshire for the year 1709 to 1710 and a suitable candidate for Parliament. He was returned at the top of the poll as Whig Member of Parliament for Huntingdonshire at the 1713 British general election. He was a fairly inactive Member, but voted on 18 March 1714 against the expulsion of Richard Steele.

Pigott was returned unopposed at the 1715 British general election, voting for the Administration on all recorded occasions in that Parliament. He did not stand in 1722 or 1727, but was returned again at a contested by-election on 7 February 1730. Although he was absent on the Excise Bill in 1733, he voted with the Government against the bill for repealing the Septennial Act in 1734. He was returned unopposed at the 1734 British general election, with the support of the 2nd Duke of Manchester. He voted with the Government for the Spanish convention in 1739, and was absent for the place bill in 1740. He did not stand at the 1741 British general election.

== Death and legacy ==
Pigott died in December 1746, leaving five sons and two surviving daughters and was buried at Chetwynd. He left estates in five counties – Cambridgeshire, Huntingdonshire, Northamptonshire, Shropshire and Warwickshire – and a personal wealth of well over £17,000. His eldest son, appears to have been a High Tory and contested Shrewsbury unsuccessfully on the Tory interest in 1747. It was said that he visited the Pretender in Rome in 1720, and came away with a portrait. The estates descended in the main line and were sold by his grandson and namesake, Robert Pigott a radical in politics and manners, who went to live in France.

Parliament of Great Britain
Preceded by John Proby; Sir John Cotton, Bt	Member of Parliament for Huntingdonshire; 1713–1722; With: Sir Matthew Dudley, Bt 1713-1715; John Bigg 1715-1722	Succeeded by John Bigg; Viscount Hinchingbrooke
Preceded by John Bigg; Marquess of Hartington	Member of Parliament for Huntingdonshire; 1730–1741; With: John Bigg 1730-1734; Lord Robert Montagu 1734-1739; Charles Clarke 1739-1741	Succeeded by William Mitchell; Coulson Fellowes
