= Charles Clarke (judge) =

English barrister, judge and politician

Charles Clarke (died 1750) was an English barrister, judge and politician.

== Life ==
The son of Alured Clarke of Godmanchester in Huntingdonshire, by his second wife Ann, fourth daughter of the Rev. Charles Trimnell, rector of Ripton-Abbotts, and sister to Bishop Charles Trimnell, he was placed at Corpus Christi College, Cambridge in 1719 under his brother Alured Clarke, then a fellow of the college. Without taking a degree, he entered Lincoln's Inn in 1717, and was called to the bar in 1723.

Clarke built up a good practice as barrister, and rebuilt the family house at Godmanchester. In 1731 he was appointed recorder of Huntingdon, and in 1739 represented Huntingdonshire in parliament. In the new parliament of 1741 he was elected for Whitchurch in Hampshire, but in its second session in Hilary term, 1743, became a baron of the exchequer in place of Sir Thomas Abney. At this time he was counsel to the admiralty, and auditor of Greenwich Hospital, where he was succeeded by Heneage Legge.

On 17 May 1750, Clarke died of a fever. It was said to have been jail distemper, caught at the Old Bailey, at the so-called "black sessions" that year. The outbreak caused the deaths of other legal figures, officials and jurymen, and was attributed to the number of prisoners and the crowd present at Captain Clark's trial for killing Captain Innes in a duel. He was buried at Godmanchester.

== Family ==
Clarke married, first, Anne, daughter of Thomas Greene, bishop of Ely, by whom he had a son Thomas, a British Army general and secondly, Jane, daughter of Major Mullins of Winchester, by whom he had four sons including Sir Alured Clarke, lieutenant-governor of Quebec in 1792; and two daughters. His second wife survived him.

== Notes ==
Attribution

This article incorporates text from a publication now in the public domain: Stephen, Leslie, ed. (1887). "Clarke, Charles (d.1750)". Dictionary of National Biography. Vol. 10. London: Smith, Elder & Co.

Parliament of Great Britain
Preceded by Lord Robert Montagu; Robert Pigott	Member of Parliament for Huntingdonshire; 1739 – 1741; With: Robert Pigott	Succeeded by William Mitchell; Coulson Fellowes
Preceded by William Sloper; John Selwyn, junior	Member of Parliament for Whitchurch; January 1743 – February 1743; With: John Selwyn, junior	Succeeded by Thomas Wentworth; John Selwyn, junior
