= Sir Matthew Dudley, 2nd Baronet =

English politician

Sir Matthew Dudley, 2nd Baronet (1 October 1661 – 14 April 1721) was an English politician.

Dudley was the son of Sir William Dudley, 1st Baronet, of Clopton, Northamptonshire. He was the High Sheriff of Northamptonshire for 1684, MP for Northampton from 1703 to 1705 and MP for Huntingdonshire from 1713 to 1715. He was elected a Fellow of the Royal Society in 1703.

Dudley died in 1721. he had married Mary, daughter of Henry O'Brien, 7th Earl of Thomond. He had 4 sons (3 of whom predeceased him) and a daughter. He was succeeded by his surviving son, Sir William Dudley, 3rd and last Baronet.

Parliament of England
Preceded by Christopher Montagu; Thomas Andrew	Member of Parliament for Northampton; 1702–1705; With: Bartholomew Tate 1702–04; Francis Arundell 1704–05	Succeeded by Francis Arundell; George Montagu
Parliament of Great Britain
Preceded by John Pocklington; Sir John Cotton, 4th Bt	Member of Parliament for Huntingdonshire; 1713–1715; With: Robert Pigott	Succeeded by Robert Pigott; John Bigg
Baronetage of England
Preceded by William Dudley	Baronet (of Clopton); 1670–1721	Succeeded by William Dudley
