= Elizabeth Montagu, Countess of Sandwich =

British noblewoman (1674–1757)

Elizabeth Montagu
- Countess of Sandwich
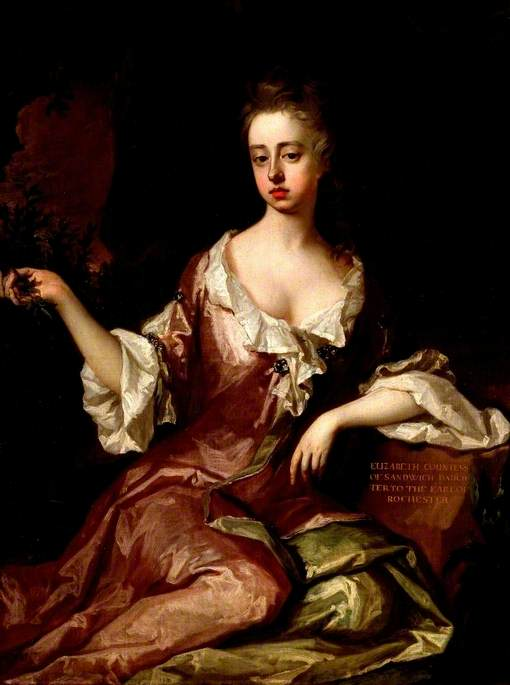
- Portrait by Michael Dahl
- Born: Elizabeth Wilmot; 1674; Addebury House, Oxfordshire, England
- Died: 27 July 1757 (aged 82–83); Paris, France
- Buried: Saint-Germain Cemetery, Paris, France
- Noble family: Wilmot
- Spouse: Edward Montagu, 3rd Earl of Sandwich
- Issue: Lady Elizabeth Montagu; Edward Montagu, Viscount Hinchingbrooke
- Father: John Wilmot, 2nd Earl of Rochester
- Mother: Elizabeth Malet

Elizabeth Montagu, Countess of Sandwich (née Wilmot; 1674, Addebury House, Oxfordshire - 27 July 1757), was a British noblewoman and the Countess of Sandwich as the spouse of Edward Montagu, 3rd Earl of Sandwich.

== Early life ==
Elizabeth was the second daughter and third surviving child of John Wilmot, 2nd Earl of Rochester and Elizabeth Malet. She was baptised on 10 February at St Mary the Virgin, Oxford. Wilmot died in 1680 and his wife died the following year. By 1681, Elizabeth Wilmot was brought up by her paternal grandmother, Anne Wilmot née St. John.

The Wilmots were a literary family, her father having been a notable poet. Elizabeth was an avid reader, fluent in multiple languages and played several musical instruments.

== Marriage and Later Life ==
The 15 year old Elizabeth married the 19 year old Edward Montagu, 3rd Earl of Sandwich in 1689. The couple had two children, only one of whom survived until adulthood:

- Lady Elizabeth Montagu, died in infancy.
- Edward Montagu, Viscount Hinchingbrooke (7 July 1692 – 3 October 1722), married Elizabeth Popham with issue.

The couple were ill suited, the earl was unambitious and easily influenced, Elizabeth would publicy rebel against her husband's Whig politics by backing the Tory Anthony Hammond.

Elizabeth was a close friend of Hortense Mancini, the Duchess of Mazarin, a mistress of Charles II.

The Countess of Sandwich was a Jacobite loyalist, supporting James Francis Edward Stuart's claim to the throne. Following her husband's death in 1729, having no surviving children, the Countess permanently relocated to France, where she established a salon. She resided in Paris where she died on 27 July 1757. She was buried at the Saint-Germain Cemetery in Paris.
