= John Proby, 1st Baron Carysfort =

British politician

Arms of Proby: Ermine, on a fess gules a lion passant or

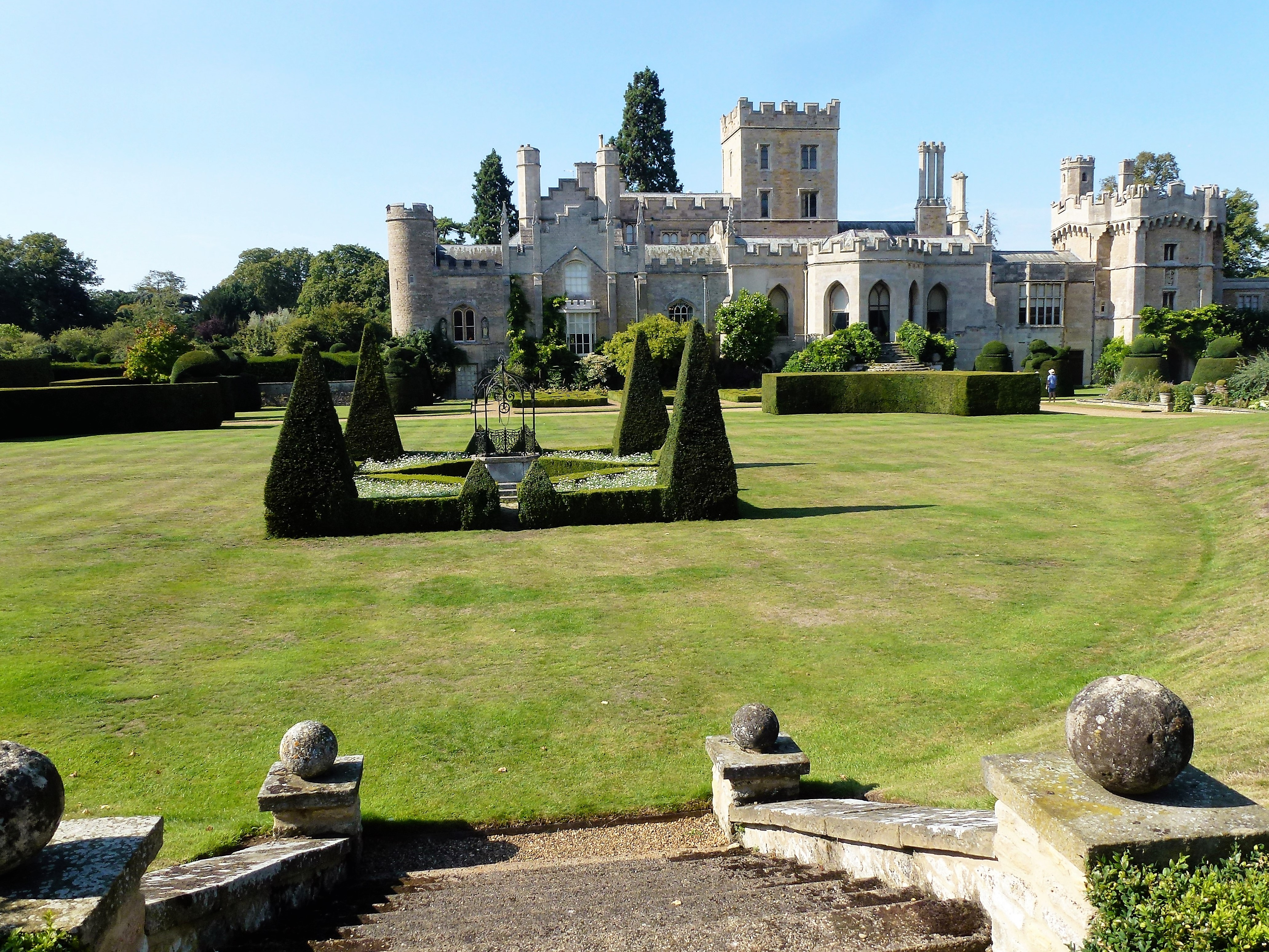
Elton Hall

John Proby, 1st Baron Carysfort KB PC (25 November 1720 – 18 October 1772) was a British Whig politician.

== Life ==
He was the son of John Proby, of Elton Hall, Huntingdonshire, and his wife Jane, daughter of John Leveson-Gower, 1st Baron Gower. He was educated at Jesus College, Cambridge.

Proby was returned to Parliament for Stamford in 1747, a seat he held until 1754, and then represented Huntingdonshire from 1754 to 1768. Carysfort served as a Lord of the Admiralty under the Duke of Devonshire in 1757 and under George Grenville from 1763 to 1765. In 1752 he was raised to the Peerage of Ireland as Baron Carysfort, of Carysfort in the County of Wicklow, and in 1758 he was admitted to the Irish Privy Council. In 1761 he was further honoured when he was made a Knight of the Order of the Bath.

Lord Carysfort died in October 1772, aged 51, and was succeeded in the barony by his son John, who was created Earl of Carysfort in 1789. Lady Carysfort died in March 1783, aged 60.

HMS Carysfort (1766) was the first ship named in his honour following his service as Lord of the Admiralty. In 1941, HMS Carysfort (R25) was named in his honour as the fifth Royal Navy warship to carry the name Carysfort.

== Family ==
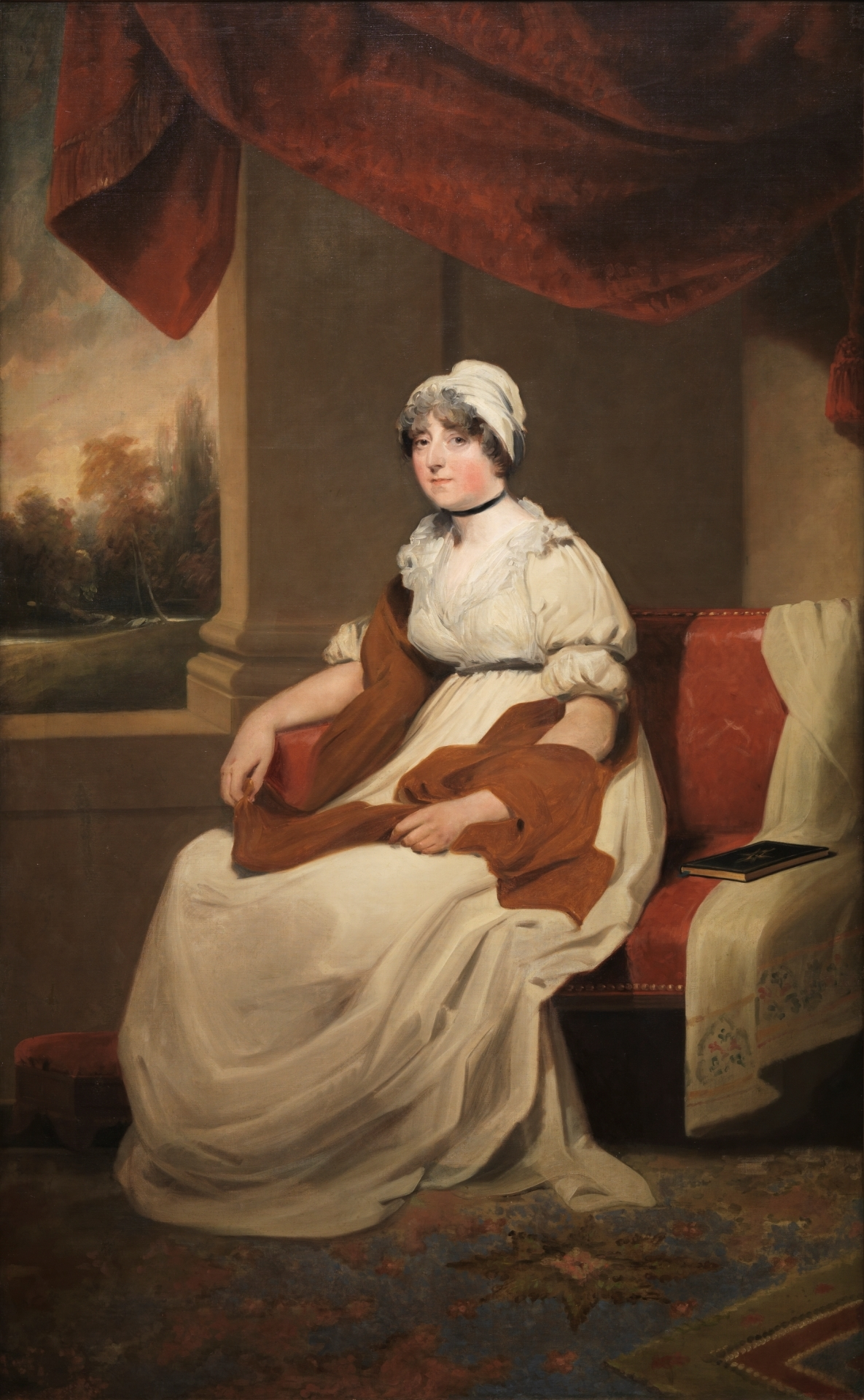
Proby's daughter Elizabeth Storer painted by Sir Thomas Lawrence

Proby married the Hon. Elizabeth Allen, daughter of Joshua Allen, 2nd Viscount Allen, in 1750: they had a son and a daughter. The daughter Elizabeth (1752–1808) married Thomas John Storer (died 1792).

Parliament of Great Britain
Preceded by William Noel; John Proby	Member of Parliament for Stamford; 1747–1754; With: Lord Burghley 1747; Robert Barbor 1747–1754	Succeeded by Robert Barbor; John Harvey-Thursby
Preceded by Coulson Fellowes; Edward Wortley Montagu	Member of Parliament for Huntingdonshire; 1754–1768; With: Coulson Fellowes 1754–1761; Viscount Mandeville 1761–1762; Lord Charles Montagu 1762–1765; Robert Bernard 1765–1768	Succeeded by Viscount Hinchingbrooke; The Earl Ludlow
Masonic offices
Preceded by The Lord Byron	Grand Master of the Premier Grand Lodge of England; 1752–1753	Succeeded by The Marquess of Carnarvon
Peerage of Ireland
New creation	Baron Carysfort; 1752–1772	Succeeded by John Joshua Proby
