= Charles Sackville, 6th Earl of Dorset =

English politician, courtier and poet

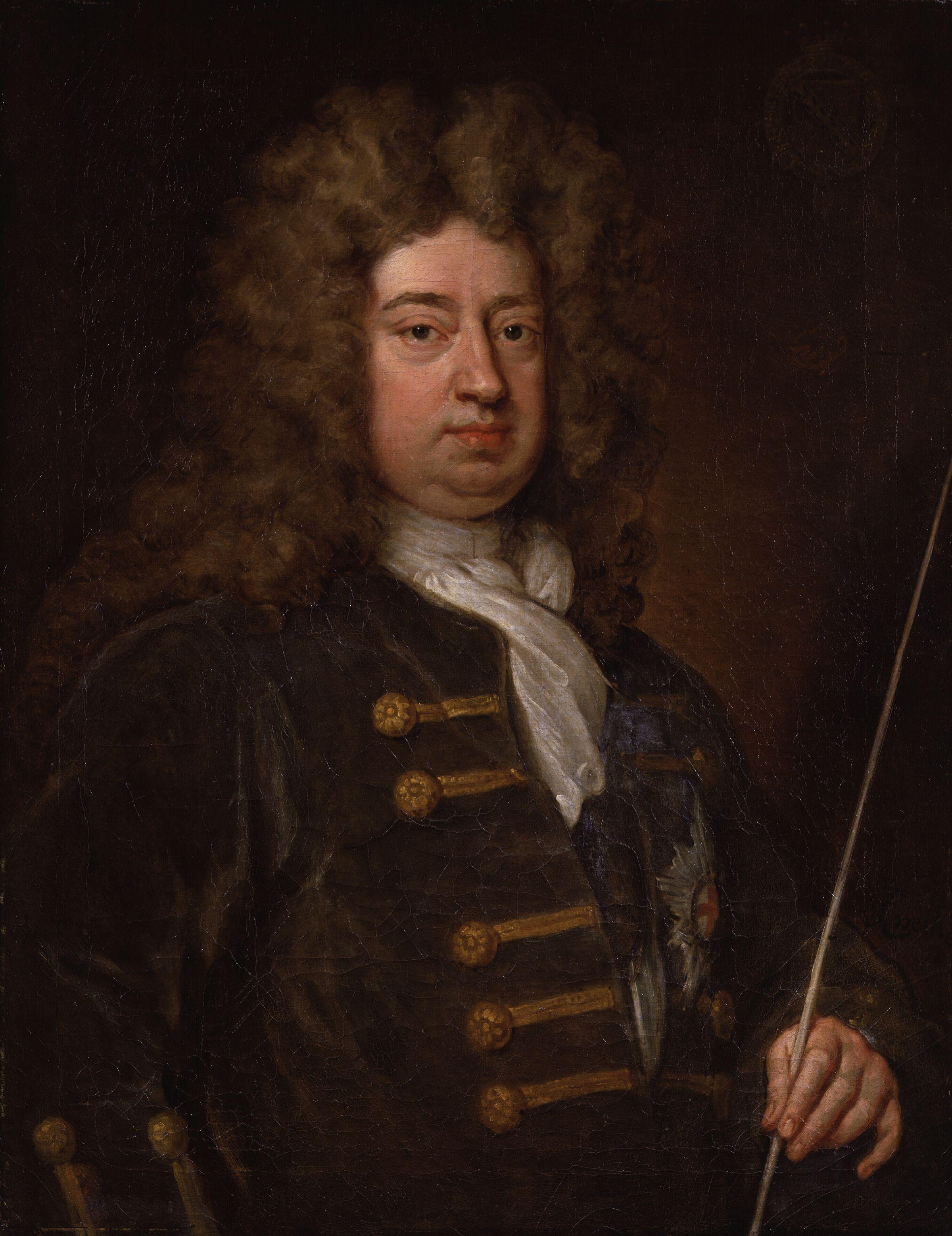
c. 1697 portrait of Dorset

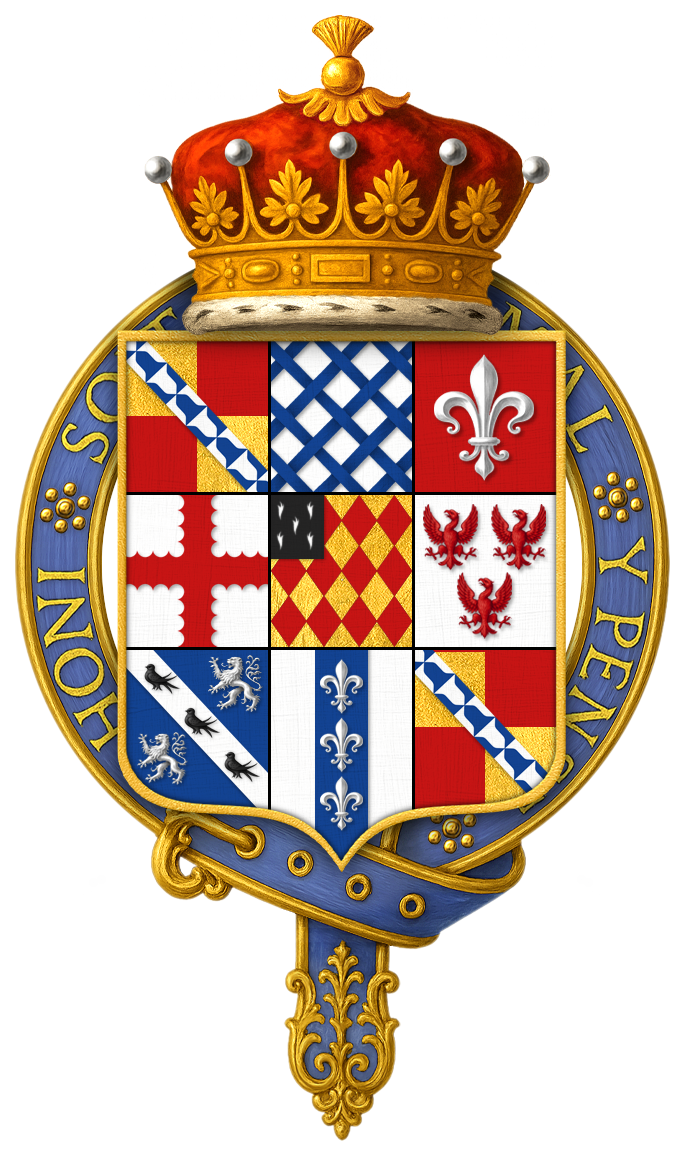
Quartered arms of Charles Sackville, 6th Earl of Dorset, KG

Charles Sackville, 6th Earl of Dorset (24 January 1643 – 29 January 1706) was an English politician, courtier and poet.

== Early life ==
Sackville was born on 24 January 1643, son of Richard Sackville, 5th Earl of Dorset (1622–1677). His mother was the former Lady Frances Cranfield, sister and heiress of the 3rd Earl of Middlesex, to whose estates he succeeded in 1674, being created Baron Cranfield, of Cranfield in the County of Middlesex, and Earl of Middlesex in 1675. He succeeded to his father's estates and title in August 1677. He was educated privately, and spent some time abroad with a private tutor, returning to England shortly before the Restoration.

== Career ==
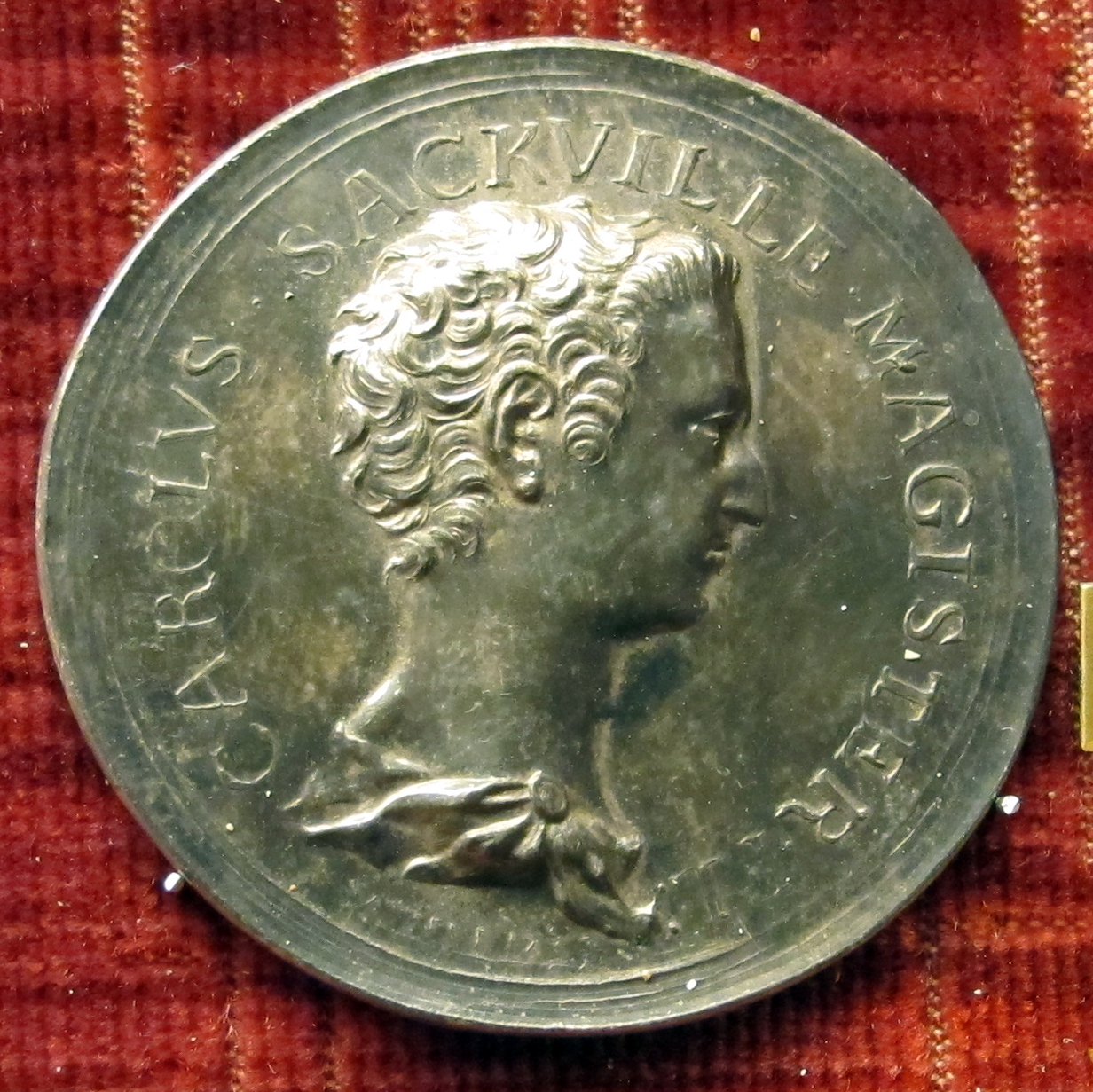
A medal by Lorenz Natter depicting Charles Sackville

During King Charles II's first Parliament, Sackville sat for East Grinstead in Sussex. He had no taste for politics, however, but won a reputation at Whitehall as a courtier and a wit.

Although an unscrupulous rake, something in Sackville's character made his follies less obnoxious to the citizens than those of the other rakes, for he was never altogether unpopular, and Rochester is said to have told Charles II that "he did not know how it was, my Lord Dorset might do anything, yet was never to blame". In 1665 he volunteered to serve under the Duke of York in the Second Anglo-Dutch War. His famous song, "To All You Ladies Now at Land", was written, according to Prior, on the night before the victory gained over foggy Opdam off Harwich (3 June 1665). Samuel Johnson, with the remark that seldom any splendid story is wholly true, said that the Earl of Orrery had told him it was only retouched on that occasion.

In 1667, Pepys lamented that Sackville had lured Nell Gwyn away from the theatre, and that with Sedley the two kept merry house at Epsom. Next year the king was paying court to Gwyn, and her Charles the Second, as she called him (Charles Hart, a former lover, being her Charles the First), was sent on a "sleeveless errand" into France to be out of the way. In 1678 he narrowly escaped death at the hands of the deranged Earl of Pembroke, with whom he was engaged in a lawsuit.

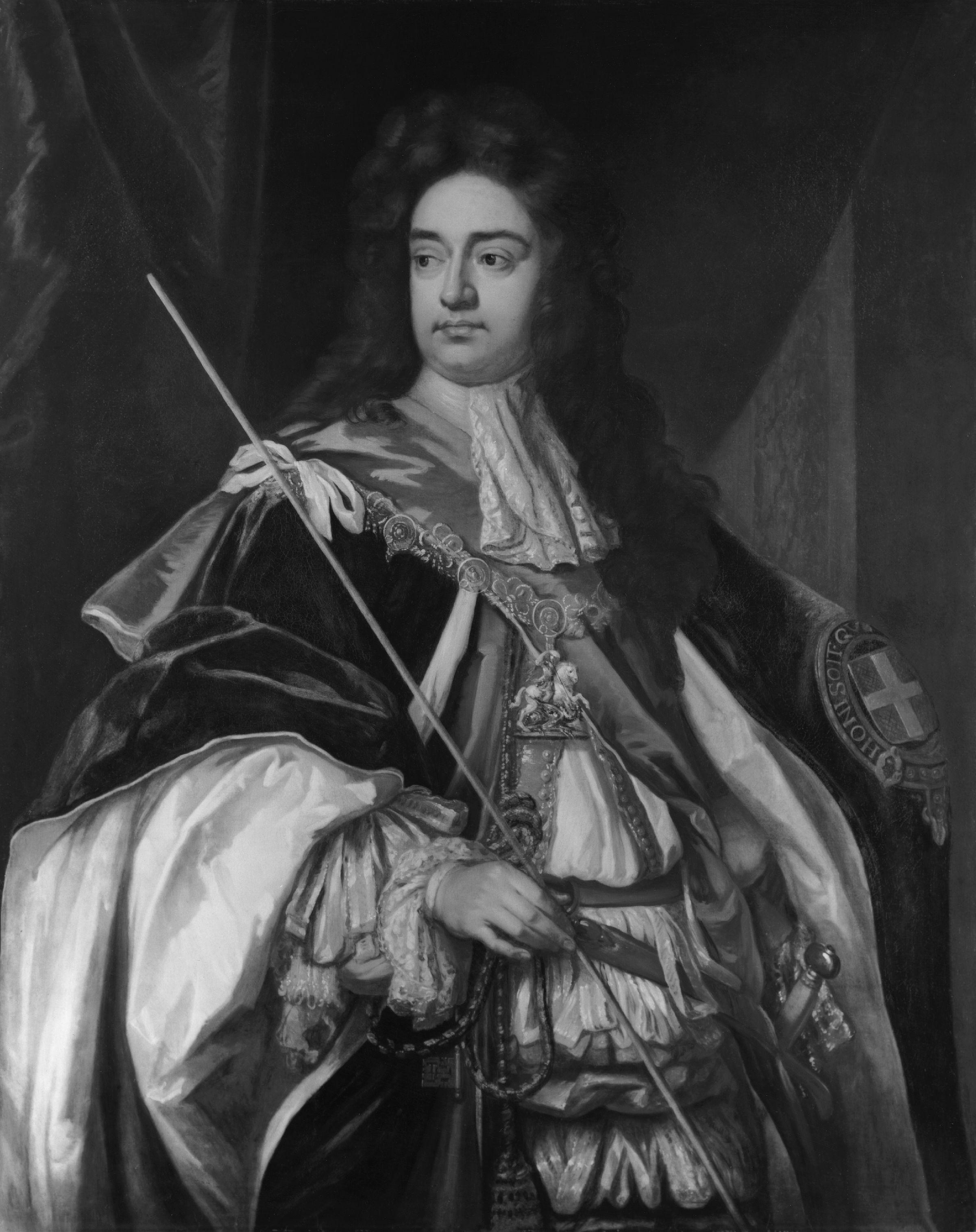
Portrait of Sackville by Godfrey Kneller, 1694

His gaiety and wit secured the continued favour of Charles II, but did not especially recommend him to James II, who could not, moreover, forgive Dorset's lampoons on his mistress, Catherine Sedley, Countess of Dorchester. On James's accession, therefore, he retired from court. Sackville concurred in the invitation to William of Orange, who made him a Privy Counsellor, Lord Chamberlain (1689), and Knight of the Garter (1692). During William's absences between 1695 and 1698, Sackville was one of the Lords Justices of the Realm. In 1699 he was elected a Fellow of the Royal Society

He was a generous patron of men of letters. When John Dryden was dismissed from the laureateship, he made him an equivalent pension from his own purse. Matthew Prior, in dedicating his Poems on Several Occasions (1709) to Dorset's son, affirms that his opinion was consulted by Edmund Waller; that the Duke of Buckingham deferred the publication of his Rehearsal until he was assured that Dorset would not rehearse upon him again; and that Samuel Butler and William Wycherley both owed their first recognition to him. Prior's praise of Dorset is no doubt extravagant, but when his youthful follies were over he appears to have developed sterling qualities, and although the poems he has left are very few, none of them are devoid of merit. Dryden's Essay on Satire and the dedication of the Essay of Dramatick Poesie are addressed to him. Walpole (Catalogue of Noble Authors, iv.) says that he had as much wit as his first master, or his contemporaries Buckingham and Rochester, without the royal want of feeling, the duke's want of principles or the earl's want of thought; and Congreve reported of him when he was dying that he slabbered more wit than other people had in their best health.

== Merry Gang ==
Sackville was part of the Merry Gang (as Andrew Marvell described them). The Merry Gang flourished for about 15 years after 1665 and included John Wilmot, 2nd Earl of Rochester Henry Jermyn; John Sheffield, Earl of Mulgrave; Henry Killigrew; Sir Charles Sedley; the playwrights William Wycherley and George Etherege; and George Villiers, 2nd Duke of Buckingham. The Merry Gang were advocates of libertinism. Members of the gang asserted the right to behave as they pleased and their antics were intended to draw the attention and amusement of the king. Rochester claimed his aim was to halt "the strange decay of manly parts since the days of dear Harry the Second (r. 1154–1189)". The gang engaged in acts that were violent, outraged public decency and often included violence against women.

Sackville's behavior was as profligate and depraved as his notorious friends Sir Charles Sedley and Lord Rochester. In 1662, Sackville and his brother Edward, with three other gentlemen, were indicted for the robbery and murder of a tanner named Hoppy. The defence was that they were in pursuit of thieves, and mistook Hoppy for a highwayman. They appear to have been acquitted, for when, in 1663, Sedley was tried for a gross breach of public decency in Covent Garden, Sackville, who had been one of the offenders, was (according to Samuel Pepys) asked by the Lord Chief Justice "whether he had so soon forgot his deliverance at that time, and that it would have more become him to have been at his prayers begging God's forgiveness than now running into such courses again."

In June 1675 "John Wilmot, 2nd Earl of Rochester in a frolick after a rant did ... beat downe the dyill (i.e. sundial) which stood in the middle of the Privie Garding, which was esteemed the rarest in Europ". John Aubrey learned what Rochester said on this occasion when he came in from his "revells" with Sackville, and Fleetwood Sheppard to see the object: "'What ... doest thou stand here to fuck time?' Dash they fell to worke". It has been speculated that the comment refers not to the dial itself, which was not phallic in appearance, but a painting of the King next to the dial that featured his phallic sceptre.

== Marriages ==
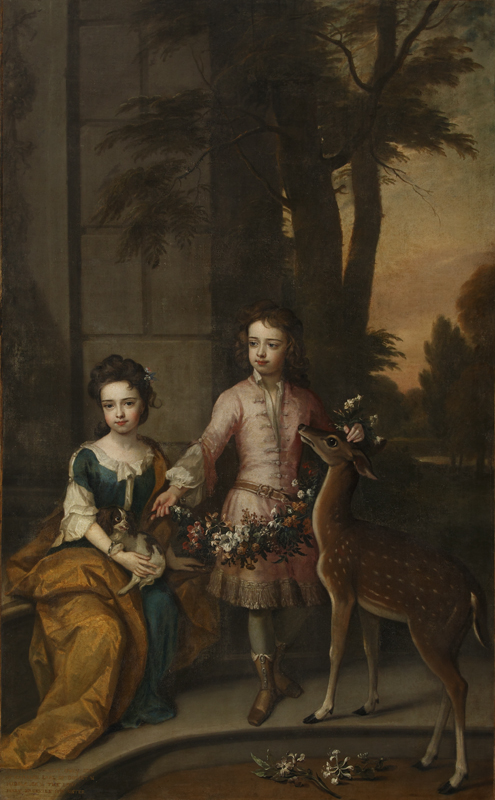
Charles Sackville had two children with his second wife, Mary Compton: Lionel (right) and Mary (left)

Sackville was three times married; he married his first wife Mary Bagot, widow of Charles Berkeley, Earl of Falmouth and daughter of Hervey Bagot and Dorothy Arden, in June 1674. He married his second wife, Mary Compton, daughter of James Compton, 3rd Earl of Northampton and Hon. Mary Noel, on 7 March 1685; they had two children together, Lionel Cranfield Sackville, 1st Duke of Dorset and Mary Sackville (1689–1705). He fathered two illegitimate daughters, one named Mary Sackville (died 26 June 1714), and the other with actress Alice Lee, named Anne Lee Sackville (1667–1738). He died at Bath in 1706.

== Works ==
The fourth act of Pompey the Great, a tragedy translated out of French by certain persons of honour, is by Dorset. The satires for which Pope classed him with the masters in that kind seem to have been short lampoons, with the exception of A faithful catalogue of our most eminent ninnies (reprinted in Bibliotheca Curiosa, ed. Goldsmid, 1885). The Works of the Earls of Rochester, Roscommon and Dorset, the Dukes of Devonshire, Buckinghamshire, &c., with Memoirs of their Lives (1731) is catalogued (No. 20841) by H. G. Bohn in 1841. His poems are included in Anderson's and other collections of British poets.

== Portrayal in film ==
Sackville is portrayed by Johnny Vegas as the invariable companion of fellow author and wit George Etherege (Tom Hollander) in the 2004 film The Libertine, an adaptation of Stephen Jeffreys' play of the same name, which depicts the Earl of Rochester and the orbit of the "Merry Gang".

== Sources ==
- "Sackville, Charles (1638-1706)" . Dictionary of National Biography. London: Smith, Elder & Co. 1885–1900.

Parliament of England
Preceded by Marmaduke Gresham; George Courthope	Member of Parliament for East Grinstead; 1661–1675; With: George Courthope	Succeeded by George Courthope; Edward Sackville
Political offices
Preceded by The Earl of Mulgrave	Lord Chamberlain; 1689–1697	Succeeded by The Earl of Sunderland
Honorary titles
Preceded by The Earl of Northumberland	Lord Lieutenant of Sussex jointly with The Earl of Dorset 1670–1677; 1670–1688	Succeeded by The Viscount Montagu
Preceded by The Viscount Montagu	Lord Lieutenant of Sussex; 1689–1706	Succeeded by Earl of Hertford
Preceded by The Viscount Fitzhardinge	Lord Lieutenant of Somerset jointly with The Marquess of Carmarthen; The Earl of Devonshire; 1690–1691	Succeeded by The Duke of Ormonde
Peerage of England
Preceded by Richard Sackville	Earl of Dorset; 1677–1706	Succeeded by Lionel Sackville
New creation	Earl of Middlesex; 1675–1706	Succeeded by Lionel Sackville
