= Edward Montagu, Viscount Hinchingbrooke =

British Army officer and politician

The Viscount Hinchingbrooke
- Lord Hinchingbrooke at age 8

Member of Parliament for Member of Parliament for Huntingdon
- In office 1713–1722

Personal details
- Spouse: Elizabeth Popham
- Children: 5, including John and William
- Parents: Edward Montagu, 3rd Earl of Sandwich (father); Elizabeth Montagu, Countess of Sandwich (mother)

Edward Richard Montagu, Viscount Hinchingbrooke (7 July 1692 – 3 October 1722) was a British Army officer and politician who sat in the House of Commons from 1713 to 1722.

== Biography ==
Hinchingbrooke was the eldest son of Edward Montagu, 3rd Earl of Sandwich and his wife Elizabeth, daughter of the Earl of Rochester. His mother kept his father, who was generally believed to be insane, much confined, leaving Hinchingbrooke to carry out the public business of his family.

On 12 April 1707, at the age of 14, Hinchingbrooke married Elizabeth Popham (died 20 March 1761), the daughter of Alexander Popham of Littlecote, Wiltshire (a grandson of Colonel Alexander Popham). After a tour of the continent in 1708, he was given command of a troop in Sir Richard Temple's Regiment of Horse for the 1709 campaign in Flanders. During this time, Hinchingbrooke was one of the infamous Mohocks, and was arrested for assaulting a watchman in 1712.

In 1713, Hinchingbrooke was elected as Member of Parliament for Huntingdon, for which he served until 1722. He was commissioned captain of the grenadier company of the 2nd Regiment of Foot Guards on 11 June 1715, and appointed an aide-de-camp to the King on 22 December.

Hinchingbrooke became colonel of the 37th Regiment of Foot in 1717. In March 1722, he was named Lord Lieutenant of Huntingdonshire and in April was returned as MP for Huntingdonshire. However, he died in October 1722, predeceasing his father. His widow later married Francis Seymour.

== Family ==
He left five children by his wife, Elizabeth Popham:

- Hon. Mary Montagu
- Hon. Elizabeth Montagu, married first in September 1737 Kelland Courtenay, married second William 'Gentleman' Smith
- Hon. Edward Montagu
- John Montagu, 4th Earl of Sandwich (1718–1792)
- Capt. Hon. William Montagu (c. 1720–1757)

Parliament of Great Britain
Preceded by Edward Wortley Montagu; Francis Page	Member of Parliament for Huntingdon; 1713–1722; With: Sidney Wortley Montagu	Succeeded by Edward Wortley Montagu; Roger Handasyde
Preceded by Robert Piggott; John Bigg	Member of Parliament for Huntingdonshire; 1722; With: John Bigg	Succeeded by John Bigg; John Proby
Military offices
Preceded by John Fane	Colonel of Viscount Hinchingbrooke's Regiment of Foot; 1717–1722	Succeeded by Robert Murray
Honorary titles
Preceded by The 1st Duke of Manchester	Lord Lieutenant of Huntingdonshire; 1722	Succeeded by The 2nd Duke of Manchester
