= Passion's Triumph over Reason =

Book by Christopher Tilmouth

Passion's Triumph over Reason: A History of the Moral Imagination from Spenser to Rochester, is a book by historian Christopher Tilmouth, first published by Oxford University Press in 2007. It is a study of English moral and philosophical attitudes to passion in the late sixteenth to seventeenth centuries.
