= Dudley baronets =

Set index for Dudley baronets

There have been two baronetcies created for persons with the surname Dudley, one in the Baronetage of England and one in the Baronetage of the United Kingdom. Both creations are extinct.

- Dudley baronets of Clopton (1660)
- Dudley baronets of Sloane Street and Kilscoran House (1813): see Sir Henry Dudley, 1st Baronet (1745–1824)
