= Robert Pigott (radical) =

English food and dress reformer

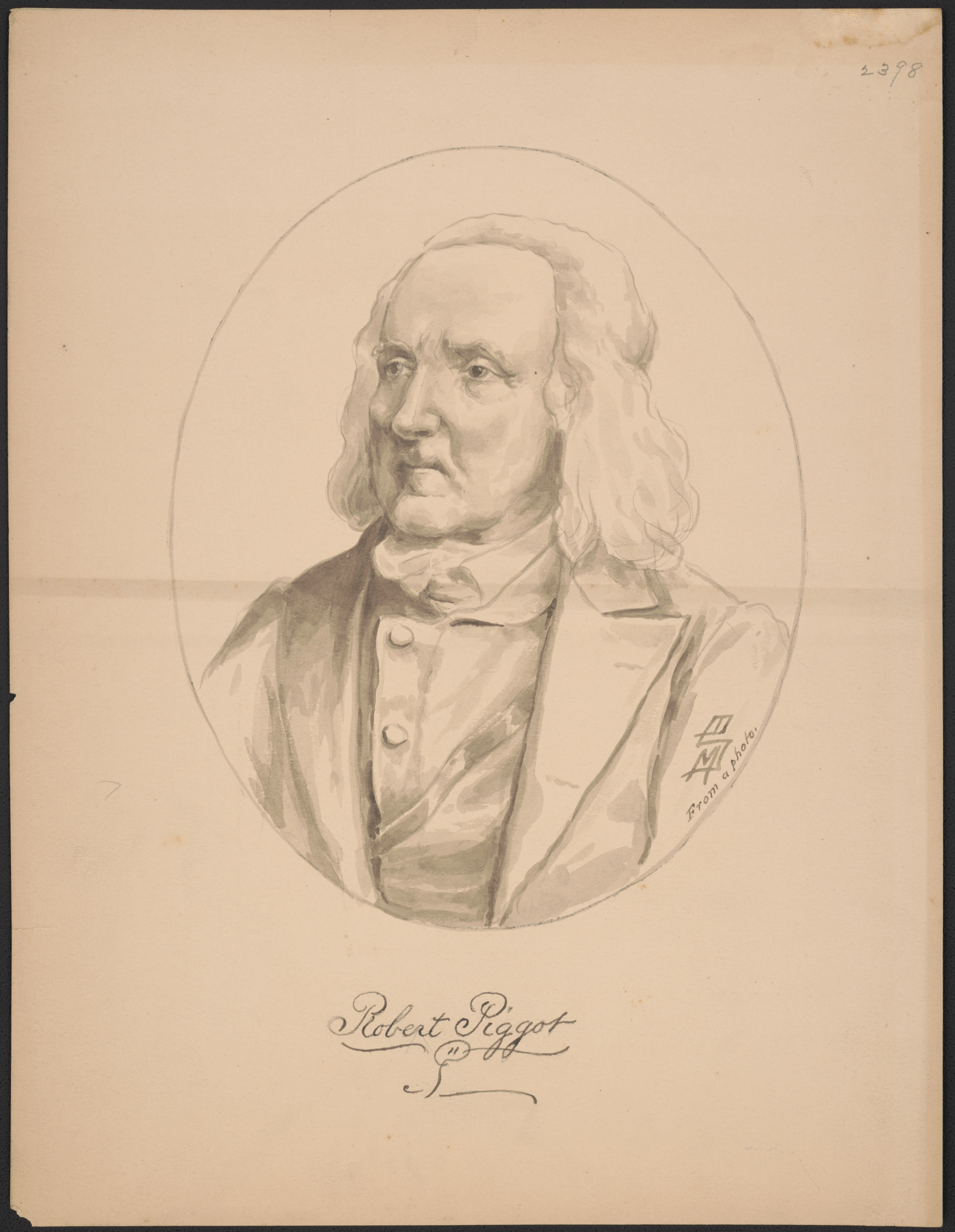
Robert Piggot

Robert Pigott (c. 1736 – 7 July 1794) was an English food and dress reformer. He was a radical in politics and manners. He sold his estates in England in 1776, and moved to Switzerland where he supported the French Revolution, promoted vegetarianism and made pronouncements on dress.

== Biography ==
Pigott was born at Chetwynd Park, Shropshire, and baptised on 24 March 1738/39 at Shrewsbury St Julian's, Shropshire. He was the son of Robert Pigott and his wife Anne Peers, and the grandson of Robert Pigott MP. He was High Sheriff of Shropshire in 1774. In 1776, he imagined that the American Revolutionary War betokened the ruin of England, and sold his Chetwynd and Chesterton estates, worth £9,000 a year. He retired to the continent, where he became acquainted with Voltaire, Franklin, and Brissot. He lived mostly in Geneva, but occasionally visited England. He became a zealous Pythagorean, as a vegetarian was then called, and was a follower of the quack James Graham (1745–1794) and his electric bed.

Pigott was enraptured by the French Revolution, especially in its more extravagant aspects. He protested against Sieyès's press bill, and published his protest, which he had read to the revolutionary club at Lyon. In an appendix to this he advocated a vegetarian diet for prisoners as being calculated to reclaim them. At Dijon in 1791 he condemned the use of bread, recommending potatoes, lentils, maize, barley, and rice. In the spring of the following year he protested against hats, arguing that they had been introduced by priests and despots, and that they concealed the face and were gloomy and monotonous, whereas caps left the countenance its natural dignity, and were susceptible of various shapes and colours. For some weeks the cap movement was very popular in Paris, but the remonstrance addressed by Pétion to the Jacobin club put an end to it. The bonnet rouge introduced later had no connection with Pigott. He considered buying and occupying a confiscated estate in the south of France, but Madame Roland, who had doubtless met him at Lyon and was amused at his oddities and fickleness, predicted that he would only build castles in the air.

In 1792 he probably settled at Toulouse. He died there on 7 July 1794, leaving a widow, Antoinette Boutan.

== See also ==
- John Oswald, Scottish philosopher, poet, journalist, political theorist, and revolutionary, known for his known for his support of the French Revolution and his advocacy of vegetarianism. He was killed in action during the War in the Vendée in 1793.
