= Brownlow Cecil, 8th Earl of Exeter =

British peer and Member of Parliament

Brownlow Cecil, 8th Earl of Exeter (4 August 1701 – 3 November 1754), known as the Honourable Brownlow Cecil from 1701 to 1722, was a British peer and Member of Parliament.

== Life ==
Exeter was the second son of John Cecil, 6th Earl of Exeter, and Elizabeth Brownlow. He was educated at St John's College, Cambridge. He briefly represented Stamford in the House of Commons in 1722, before he succeeded his elder brother in the earldom and entered the House of Lords. Lord Exeter married Hannah Sophia Chambers, daughter of Thomas Chambers, Gent., London merchant and Governor of the Company of Copper Mines (otherwise known as the English Copper Company), on 18 July 1724, at St James, Westminster, London. He died in November 1754, aged 53, and was succeeded in his titles by his eldest son Brownlow. Lady Exeter died in 1765.

Parliament of the United Kingdom
Preceded by Charles Cecil; Charles Bertie	Member of Parliament for Stamford; 1722; With: Charles Bertie	Succeeded by Charles Bertie; William Noel
Peerage of England
Preceded by John Cecil	Earl of Exeter; 1722–1754	Succeeded by Brownlow Cecil
