= Edward Fellowes, 1st Baron de Ramsey =

Edward Fellowes, 1st Baron de Ramsey DL (14 May 1809 – 9 August 1887) was a British Conservative Member of Parliament.

De Ramsey was the son of William Henry Fellowes, of Ramsey Abbey in Huntingdonshire, and Emma Benyon. He was elected to the House of Commons for Huntingdonshire in 1837, a seat he held for 43 years, until 1880. In July 1887, only a month before his death, he was raised to the peerage as Baron de Ramsey, of Ramsey Abbey in the County of Huntingdon.

Fellowes was a major English landowner; his estates included approximately 20,021 acres across Huntingdonshire, Norfolk, and Cambridgeshire, including 15,629 acres in Huntingdonshire centred on Ramsey Abbey, 4,083 acres in Norfolk centred on Haveringland Hall, and 309 acres in Cambridgeshire. He also maintained a large London townhouse at No. 3 Belgrave Square.

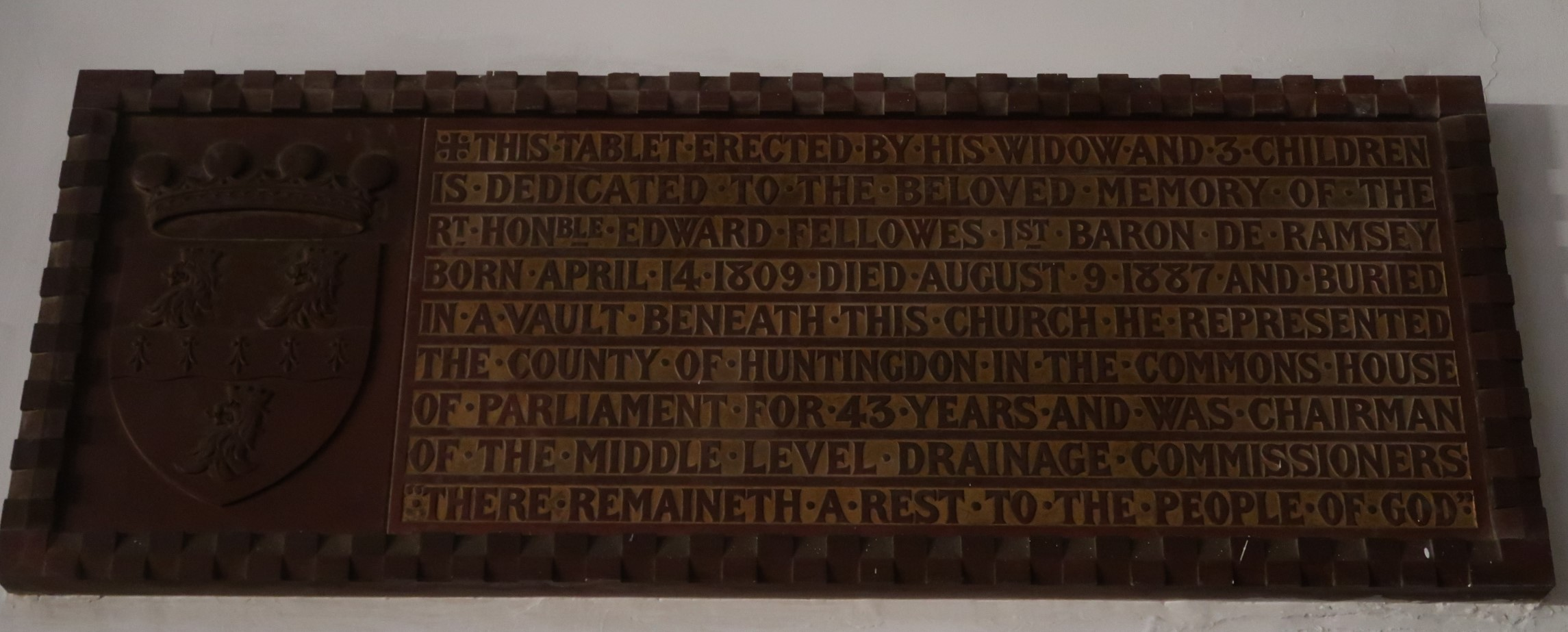
Wall plaque to Edward Fellowes in the Church of St Thomas à Becket, Ramsey, Cambridgeshire indicating his burial

Lord de Ramsey married, in 1845, Hon. Mary Julia Milles, daughter of George Milles, 4th Baron Sondes. He died in August 1887, aged 78, and was succeeded in the barony by his eldest son William Henry Fellowes. The Dowager Lady de Ramsey died 10 April 1901. Their younger son Ailwyn Fellowes was a Conservative politician, elevated to the peerage as Baron Ailwyn in 1921.

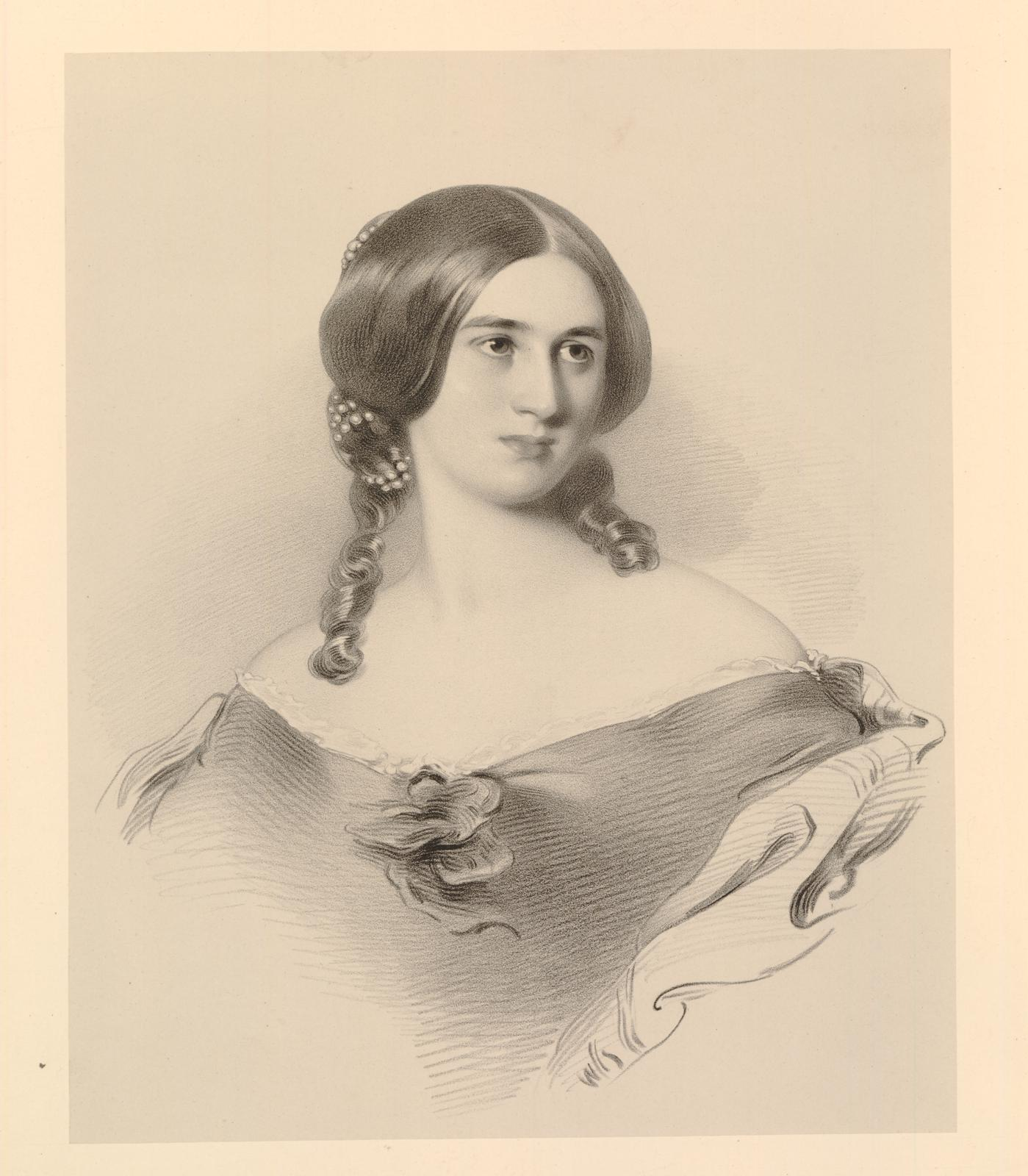
Lady de Ramsey, 1850 lithograph

Parliament of the United Kingdom
Preceded by Viscount Mandeville; John Bonfoy Rooper	Member of Parliament for Huntingdonshire; 1837–1880; With: George Thornhill 1837–1852; Viscount Mandeville 1852–1855; James Rust 1855–1859; Lord Robert Montagu 1859–1874; Sir Henry Carstairs Pelly 1874–1877; Viscount Mandeville 1877–1880	Succeeded by William Henry Fellowes; Lord Douglas Gordon
Peerage of the United Kingdom
New creation	Baron de Ramsey; 1887	Succeeded by William Henry Fellowes
