= Lina Scott Gatty =

British politician (1873–1964)

Lina Scott Gatty

Lina Mary Scott Gatty OBE (24 February 1873 – 15 April 1964), was a British Liberal Party politician. She was born Lina Mary Hart Dyke, and died as Lina Mary Crivellari. She was awarded the Order of Queen Elisabeth of Belgium. She was awarded an OBE in 1918 for her work as honorary secretary of the Huntingdonshire County Association of Voluntary Workers.

== Background ==
She was the eldest daughter of Rt Hon. Sir William Hart Dyke, and Emily Caroline Montagu. She was the niece of Edward Montagu, 8th Earl of Sandwich. In 1902 she married Alexander John Scott Scott-Gatty. In 1903 they had a son Edward Comyn Scott-Gatty. They divorced in 1926. In 1931 she married Antonio Crivellari.

== Politics ==
In 1920 she was a member of the English Speaking Union. She was a leading Conservative in Huntingdonshire before joining the Liberal party. She was a Member of Huntingdonshire County Council. She served on Hospital Boards and School Managers' Committees. She was selected as Liberal candidate for the Huntingdonshire Division at the 1922 General Election. This was her home constituency and one that had been represented by her Uncle, Lord Sandwich. It was a safe Unionist seat. Any hopes she might have entertained of winning were dashed when a Labour candidate entered the contest to split the ant-Unionist vote.

General Election 1922: Huntingdonshire Electorate
| Party | Candidate | Votes | % | ±% |
|---|---|---|---|---|
| Conservative | Charles Murchison | 10,079 | 50.7 | −11.9 |
| Liberal | Lina Scott Gatty | 5,123 | 25.7 | −11.7 |
| Labour | Dermot Johnston Freyer | 4,697 | 23.6 | N/A |
| Majority | | 4,956 | 25.0 | |
| Turnout | | 19,899 | 70.7 | +7.9 |
| Conservative hold | | Swing | −0.1 | |

She did not stand for parliament again but remained active in the Liberal party. She worked closely with Leonard Costello who succeeded her as Liberal candidate, winning the seat when Labour withdrew in 1923. In 1924 she was elected to the Council of the Women's National Liberal Federation. In 1926 she was Treasurer of the Eastern Counties Liberal Federation.
