= George Thornhill =

George Thornhill may refer to:

- George Thornhill (cricketer) (1811–1875), English cricketer
- George Thornhill (MP) (1783–1852), English member of parliament
