= Lord Robert Montagu =

British politician (1825–1902)

The Right Honourable Lord Robert Montagu PC
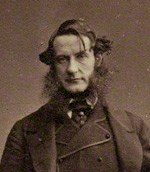

Vice-President of the Committee on Education
- In office 19 March 1867 – 1 December 1868
- Monarch: Victoria
- Prime Minister: The Earl of Derby; Benjamin Disraeli
- Preceded by: Hon. Henry Lowry-Corry
- Succeeded by: William Edward Forster

Personal details
- Born: 24 January 1825 Melchbourne, Bedfordshire
- Died: 6 May 1902 (aged 77) South Kensington, London
- Party: Conservative
- Spouse(s): (1) Ellen Cromie (1825-1857) (2) Elizabeth Wade (1839-1908)
- Children: 10
- Parent(s): George Montagu, 6th Duke of Manchester; Millicent Bernard-Sparrow
- Education: Trinity College, Cambridge

Lord Robert Montagu PC (24 January 1825 – 6 May 1902) was a British Conservative politician. He served as Vice-President of the Committee on Education between 1867 and 1868.

== Background and education ==
Montagu was born at Melchbourne, Bedfordshire the second son of George Montagu, 6th Duke of Manchester by his first wife Millicent, daughter of Robert Bernard Sparrow. William Montagu, 7th Duke of Manchester, was his elder brother. He was educated at Trinity College, Cambridge, and graduated with an MA in 1849.

In 1846 his father as Lord Lieutenant of Huntingdonshire commissioned him as a Captain in the disembodied Huntingdonshire Militia.

== Political career ==
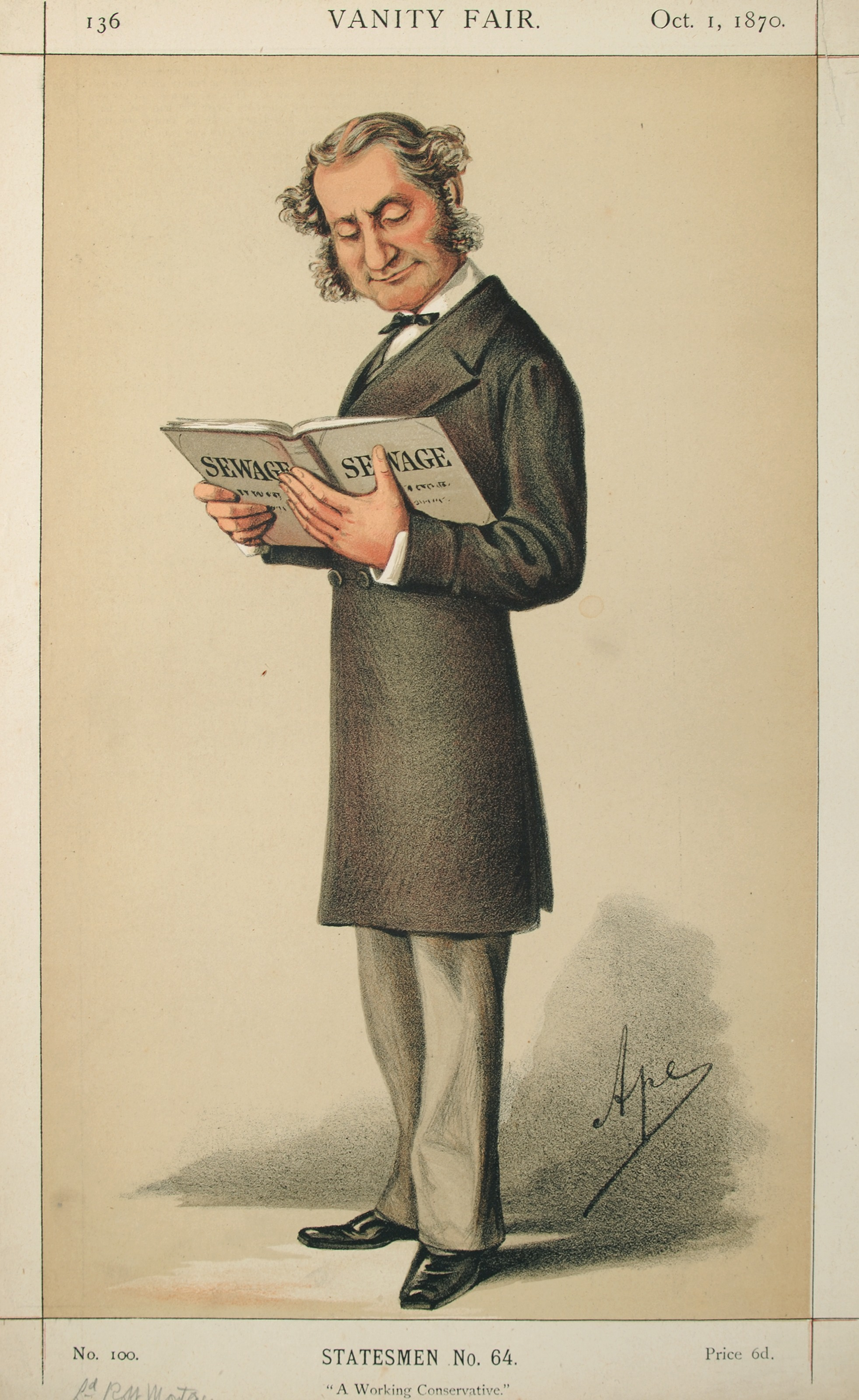
"A Working Conservative" As depicted by "Ape" (Carlo Pellegrini) in Vanity Fair, 1 October 1870

Montagu sat as Member of Parliament for Huntingdonshire from 1859 to 1874 and for County Westmeath from February 1874 until he retired in 1880. He held office under the Earl of Derby and Benjamin Disraeli as Vice-President of the Committee on Education from March 1867 until the fall of the government in December 1868 and was sworn of the Privy Council in 1867. He was an advocate of protectionist policies. He was a member of the Carlton Club and the Athenaeum Club.

== Family ==
Montagu married firstly Ellen Cromie, born in 1825, daughter of John Cromie, at Portstewart on 12 February 1850. They had four children although their first son, John, died as a child. Ellen died aged 32 on 11 July 1857 at Portstewart, County Londonderry. Montagu remarried in London on 18 October 1862 to Elizabeth Wade (Holton, Suffolk, 15 May 1839 – London, 29 December 1908), daughter of William Wade of Holton, Suffolk, and had six more children. This second marriage scandalized society, since the former Betsy Wade had been a housemaid when Montagu met her. Montagu died 6 May 1902 at 91 Queens Gate, South Kensington, London and was buried in Kensal Green Cemetery.

Parliament of the United Kingdom
Preceded by Edward Fellowes; James Rust	Member of Parliament for Huntingdonshire; 1859 – 1874; With: Edward Fellowes	Succeeded by Edward Fellowes; Sir Henry Pelly, Bt
Preceded by Hon. Algernon Greville; Patrick James Smyth	Member of Parliament for County Westmeath; 1874 – 1880; With: Patrick James Smyth	Succeeded by Timothy Daniel Sullivan; Henry Joseph Gill
Political offices
Preceded by Hon. Henry Lowry-Corry	Vice-President of the Committee on Education; 1867–1868	Succeeded by William Edward Forster
