= George Montagu, 6th Duke of Manchester =

British politician

His Grace The Duke of Manchester DL
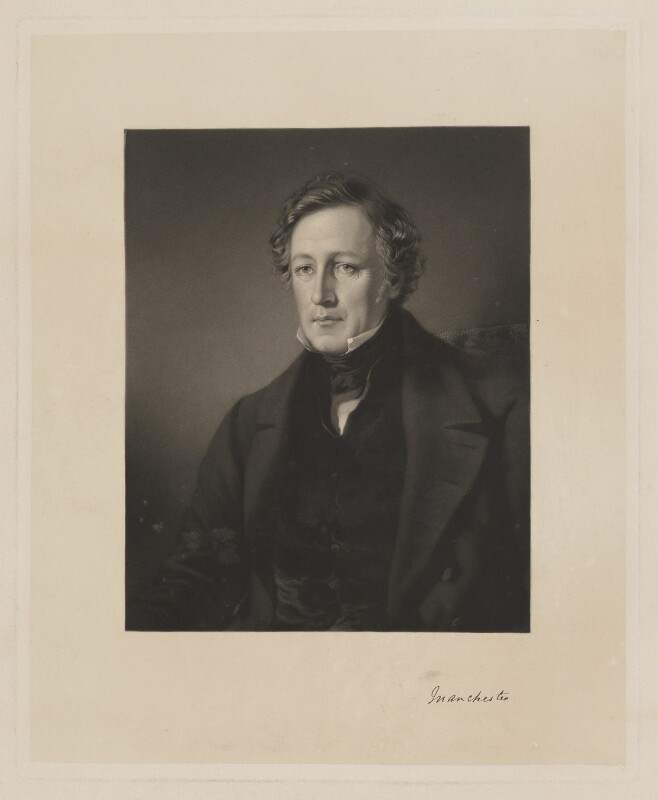

Member of Parliament for Huntingdonshire
- In office 1826–1837
- Preceded by: William Henry Fellowes; Lord John Russell
- Succeeded by: Edward Fellowes; George Thornhill

Personal details
- Born: George Montagu; 19 July 1799 Kimbolton Castle, Huntingdonshire
- Died: 18 August 1855 (aged 56) Tunbridge Wells
- Party: Tory
- Spouses: Millicent Bernard-Sparrow (m. 1822; died 1848) Harriet Sydney Dobbs (m. 1850)
- Children: 6
- Parent(s): William Montagu, 5th Duke of Manchester; Lady Susan Gordon
- Education: Eton College

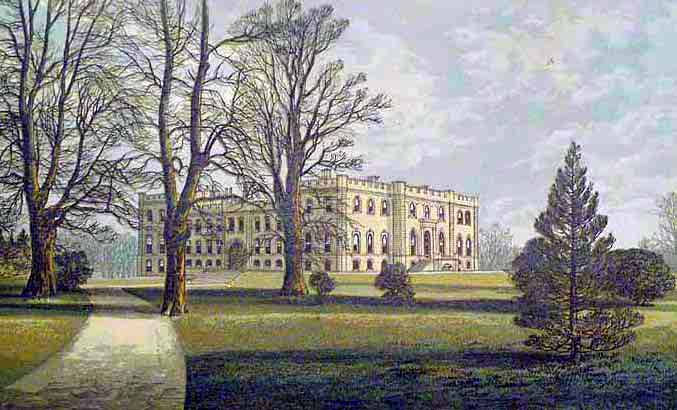
Kimbolton Hall (1880), former seat of the Dukes of Manchester

George Montagu, 6th Duke of Manchester DL (9 July 1799 – 18 August 1855), known as Viscount Mandeville from 1799 to 1843, was a British peer and Tory Member of Parliament.

== Early life ==
George Montagu was born at Kimbolton Castle, Huntingdonshire, on 9 July 1799. He was the eldest son of William Montagu, 5th Duke of Manchester and Lady Susan Gordon (1774–1828). Among his siblings were Lady Susan Montagu (wife of George Hay, 8th Marquess of Tweeddale) and Lady Caroline Montagu (wife of John Hales Calcraft MP for Wareham).

His paternal grandparents were George Montagu, 4th Duke of Manchester and the former Elizabeth Dashwood (eldest daughter of Sir James Dashwood, 2nd Baronet). His maternal grandparents were Alexander Gordon, 4th Duke of Gordon and the former Jane Maxwell (a daughter of Sir William Maxwell, 3rd Baronet). His mother was the sister and co-heiress of George Gordon, 5th Duke of Gordon.

He was educated at Eton. He joined the Royal Navy direct from school and had been promoted to lieutenant before retiring in 1822. From 1818 he had served on HMS Larne at Jamaica, where his father was Governor. In 1816 his father named the newly founded town of Mandeville, Jamaica after him.

== Career ==
George Montagu was MP for Huntingdonshire 1826–1837. He succeeded his father to the dukedom in 1843.

Manchester also served as Deputy Lieutenant of County Armagh.

== Personal life ==
On 8 October 1822, George Montagu married firstly Millicent Bernard-Sparrow (1798–1848) in London. Millicent was a daughter of Brig. Gen. Robert Bernard Sparrow of Brampton Park, Huntingdonshire, and wife the Lady Olivia Acheson (eldest daughter of Arthur Acheson, 1st Earl of Gosford). His father presented him with Kimbolton Castle, the family seat in Huntingdonshire and his wife brought him Brampton Park and an estate in Ireland. He also took out a lease on Melchbourne Park, Bedfordshire. Together, George and Millicent had four children:

- William Montagu, 7th Duke of Manchester (1823–1890).
- Lord Robert Montagu (1825–1902), married Ellen Cromie and Elizabeth Wade and had issue.
- Lord Frederick Montagu (1828–1854), who died unmarried and without issue.
- Lady Olivia Susan Montagu (1830–1922), who married Charles Bennet, 6th Earl of Tankerville at Kimbolton Castle in 1850.

His first wife died on 21 November 1848 at Kimbolton Castle. On 29 August 1850, Montagu married his second wife, Harriet Sydney Dobbs (1834–1907) at Kilroot, County Antrim. She was a daughter of Conway Richard Dobbs of Castle Dobbs, County Antrim. Together, George and Harriet were the parents of two children:

- Lady Sydney Charlotte Montagu (1851–1932), who married Algernon Keith-Falconer, 9th Earl of Kintore in Hanover Square, London in 1873.
- Lord George Francis Montagu (1855–1882), a Lieutenant who died unmarried and without issue.

He died in Tunbridge Wells on 18 August 1855, aged 56. His widow died in May 1907 in Ore, Sussex.

Parliament of the United Kingdom
Preceded by William Henry Fellowes; Lord John Russell	Member of Parliament for Huntingdonshire; 1826–1837; With: William Henry Fellowes 1826–1830; Lord Strathavon 1830–1831; John Bonfoy Rooper 1831–1837	Succeeded by Edward Fellowes; George Thornhill
Peerage of Great Britain
Preceded by William Montagu	Duke of Manchester; 1843–1855	Succeeded by William Drogo Montagu
