= William Montagu, 7th Duke of Manchester =

British Peer and politician

His Grace The Duke of Manchester KP
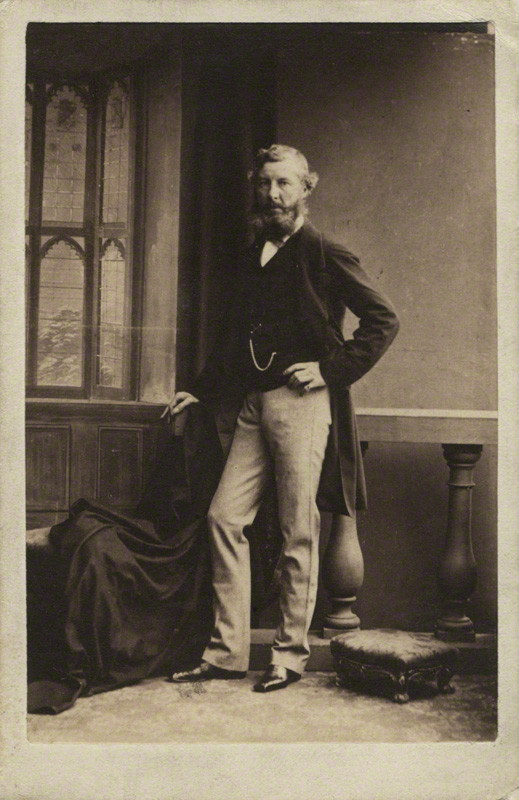
- The Duke of Manchester, 1860

Member of Parliament for Bewdley
- In office 1848–1852
- Monarch: Victoria

Member of Parliament for Huntingdonshire
- In office 1852–1855
- Monarch: Victoria

Personal details
- Born: William Drogo Montagu, Lord Kimbolton; 15 October 1823 Kimbolton Castle, Huntingdonshire, England
- Died: 22 March 1890 (aged 66) Naples, Italy
- Party: Conservative
- Spouse: Countess Luise Friederike Auguste von Alten (m. 1852)
- Children: William Edward Palmer (illegitimate); George Montagu, 8th Duke of Manchester; Mary Louise Montagu, Duchess of Hamilton; Louisa Acheson, Countess of Gosford; Lord Charles Montagu; Alice Stanley, Countess of Derby
- Parents: George Montagu, 6th Duke of Manchester; Millicent Bernard-Sparrow

William Drogo Montagu, 7th Duke of Manchester KP (15 October 1823 – 22 March 1890), known as Lord Kimbolton from 1823 to 1843 and as Viscount Mandeville from 1843 to 1855, was a British peer and Conservative Member of Parliament.

== Early life ==
William Montagu was born at Kimbolton Castle in 1823. He was the eldest son of George Montagu, 6th Duke of Manchester. His mother was Millicent Bernard-Sparrow, daughter of Brig. Gen. Robert Bernard-Sparrow of Brampton Park, Huntingdonshire, and wife the Lady Olivia Acheson (eldest daughter of Arthur Acheson, 1st Earl of Gosford).

== Military career ==
He was commissioned into the 11th Foot, then on 21 January 1842 he purchased the rank of Ensign & Lieutenant in the Grenadier Guards, and on 1 December 1846 he bought his promotion to Lieutenant & Captain. He retired from the regiment on 17 September 1850. When the Militia was reformed in 1852, he was appointed Major and second-in-command of the Huntingdonshire Rifles, a position he held, latterly with the personal rank of Lieutenant-Colonel, until 1880.

== Political career ==
He was MP for Bewdley 1848–1852 and Huntingdonshire 1852–1855.

He joined the Canterbury Association on 27 May 1848. It was Edward Gibbon Wakefield's unfulfilled hope that Lord Mandeville would emigrate to New Zealand and be the aristocratic leader in the colony. However, Lord Mandeville and his grandmother, Lady Olivia Bernard-Sparrow, did buy 500 acres (200 ha) of land between them in Riccarton. Mandeville North near Kaiapoi is named after Lord Mandeville.

He succeeded to the dukedom on the death of his father in 1855, inheriting the family seat of Kimbolton Castle in Huntingdonshire.

== Personal life ==
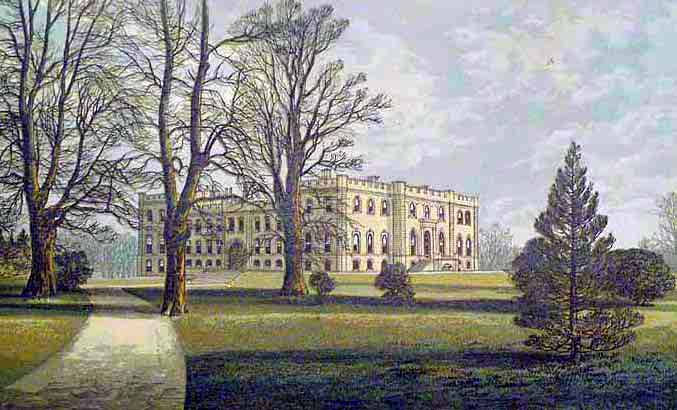
Kimbolton Castle (1880), the former family seat of the Dukes of Manchester

He had an illegitimate son with Sarah Maria Morris. When Sarah was eight months pregnant, the Montagu family had her married off to Samuel Palmer on 4 March 1850. When the child was born on 10 May 1850, he was named William Edward Palmer. William Edward Palmer married Emma Prentice on 24 December 1873, at Harrold, Bedfordshire.

William was married to Countess Luise Friederike Auguste von Alten in Hanover on 22 July 1852. Together, they had five children:

- George Victor Drogo Montagu, 8th Duke of Manchester (1853–1892), who married Francisca de la Consolacion Yznaga on 22 May 1876.
- Lady Mary Louisa Elizabeth Montagu (1854–1934), who married William Douglas-Hamilton, 12th Duke of Hamilton on 10 December 1873. She remarried Robert Forster on 20 July 1897.
- Lady Louisa Augusta Beatrice Montagu (1856–1944), who married Archibald Acheson, 4th Earl of Gosford on 10 August 1876.
- Lord Charles William Augustus Montagu (1860–1939), who married Hon. Mildred Sturt (daughter of Henry Gerard Sturt, 1st Baron Alington) on 4 December 1930.
- Lady Alice Maude Olivia Montagu (1862–1957), who married Edward Stanley, 17th Earl of Derby on 5 January 1889.

In 1877, he was created a Knight of the Order of St Patrick. He was also the Grand Prior of the Order of Saint John (1861-1888), the last one not to be a member of the Royal House.

He held 27,000 acres with 13,000 of these in Huntingdon and 12,000 in Co Armagh.

He died on 22 March 1890, in Italy at the Hotel Royal, Naples.

Parliament of the United Kingdom
Preceded by Thomas Ireland	Member of Parliament for Bewdley; 1848–1852	Succeeded by Sir Thomas Winnington, Bt
Preceded by Edward Fellowes; George Thornhill	Member of Parliament for Huntingdonshire; 1852–1855; With: Edward Fellowes	Succeeded by Edward Fellowes; James Rust
Peerage of Great Britain
Preceded by George Montagu	Duke of Manchester; 1855–1890	Succeeded by George Victor Drogo Montagu
