= John Sapcote =

John Sapcote may refer to:

- John Sapcote (MP for Ripon) in 1559
- John Sapcote (MP for Huntingdonshire) represented Huntingdonshire in 1475
