= Pondersbridge =

Village in Cambridgeshire, England

Coordinates: 52.5118°N 0.1432°W

- Location within Cambridgeshire
- OS grid reference: TL261920
- Civil parish: Whittlesey
- District: Fenland
- Shire county: Cambridgeshire
- Region: East
- Country: England
- Sovereign state: United Kingdom
- Post town: Huntingdon
- Postcode district: PE26
- Dialling code: 01748
- Police: Cambridgeshire
- Fire: Cambridgeshire
- Ambulance: East of England

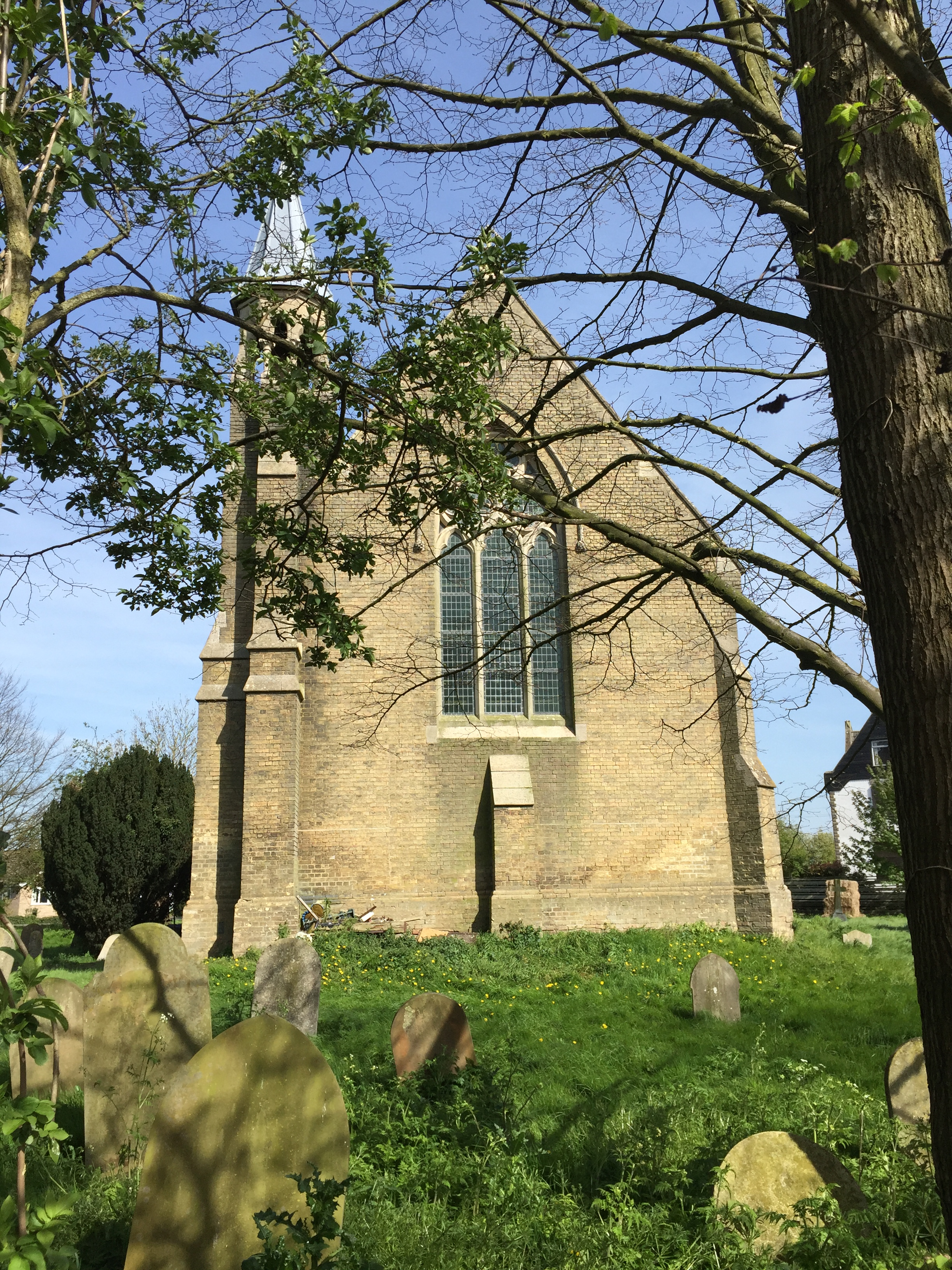
St Thomas Church, Pondersbridge, Cambridgeshire

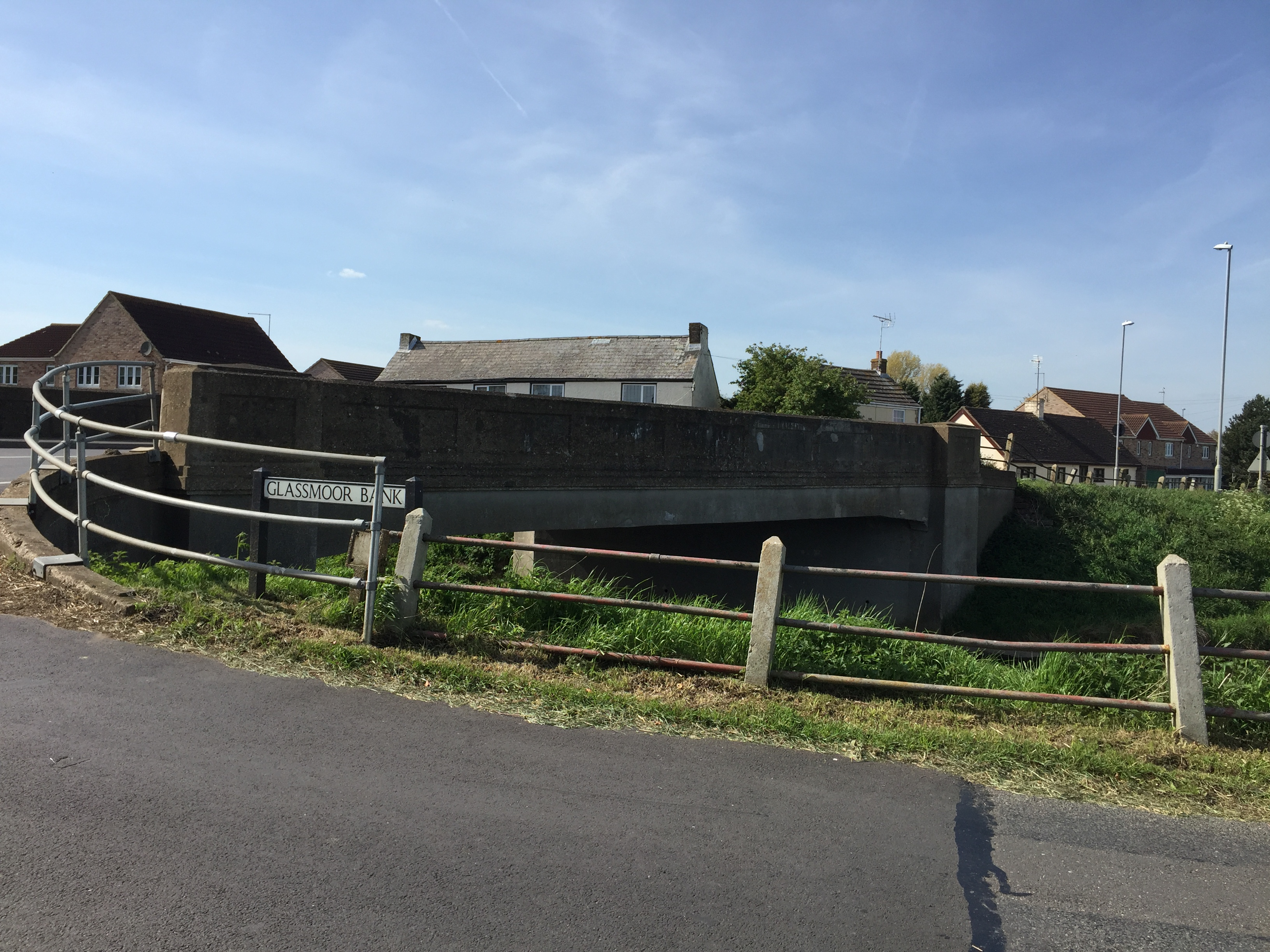
Road Bridge over Bevills Leam in Pondersbridge, Cambridgeshire

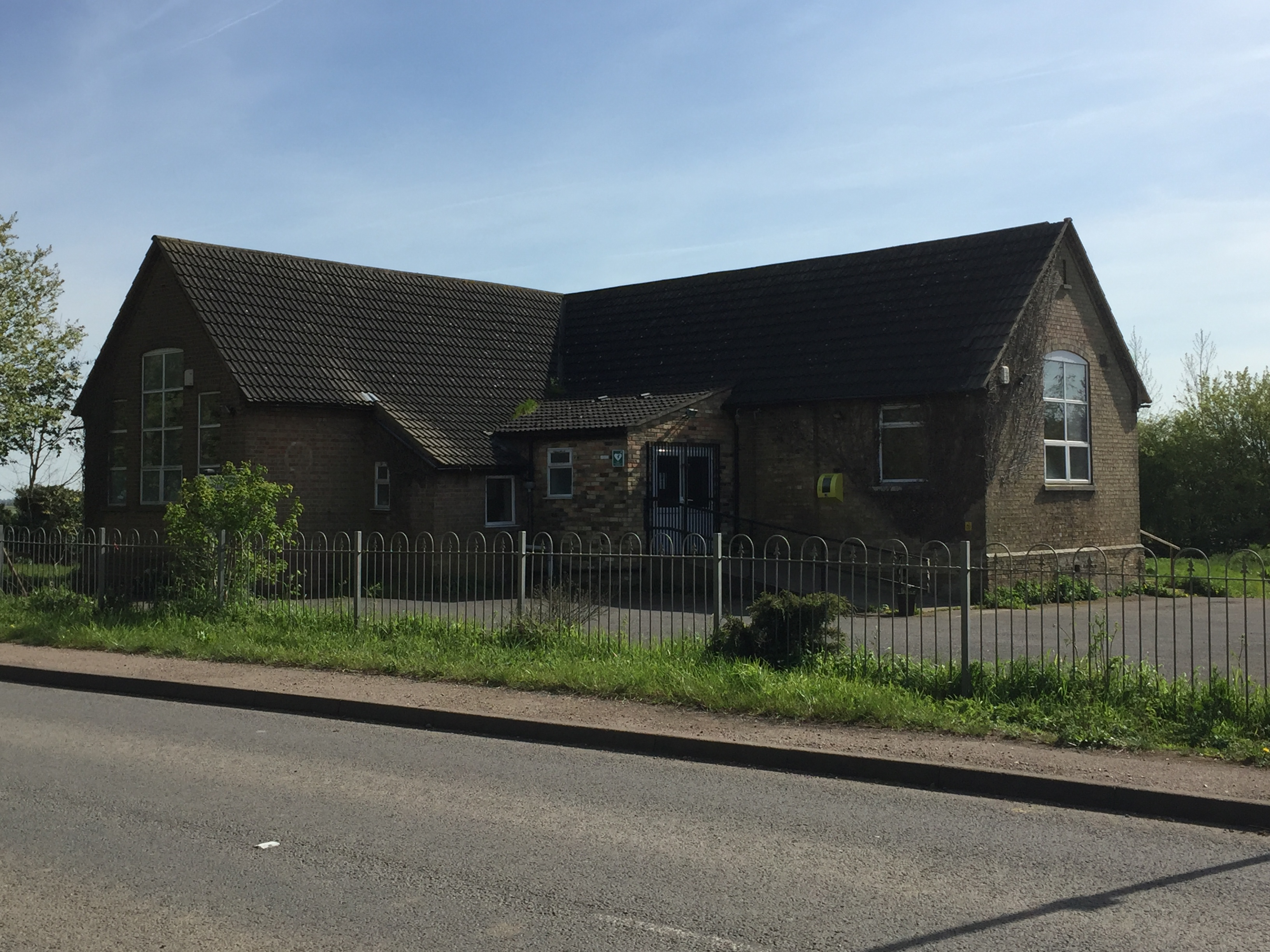
Pondersbridge Village Hall

Pondersbridge is a village in Whittlesey civil parish, part of the Fenland district of Cambridgeshire, England.

== Village ==
Pondersbridge is a settlement which has built up around the river crossing, situated on an artificial drainage cutting called Bevill's Leam. The banks of Bevill's Leam form a strong visual boundary. The older settlement has been extended on the Main Road, northwards by the local authority housing. The settlement has very limited services and a sporadic development pattern. The main part of Pondersbridge is contained within a triangle of roads: the B1040, the B1095 (from Stanground) and The Drove.

The village has a population of just over 200 people and in 1990 had 46 houses, with planning permission for 19 more.

The eponymous bridge over the Leam is a minor waterways place on the Middle Level Navigations between Bevill's Leam Pumping Station and Angle Corner.

Situated on the B1040 road, the village is home to the Church of St. Thomas. St. Thomas' Church was built in 1869 to replace a previous church in the village.

Ordnance Survey maps from the 1920s show an agricultural tramway running from Bevills' Leam to the northeast of the village to Engine Farm then southwest and southeast across Glass Fen.

There is a village hall which hosts community events and has a wall-mounted defibrillator on an external wall.

There was once a pub, The Green Man, which was in existence in 1916.

== Historical descriptions ==
Transcribed from The National Gazetteer of Great Britain and Ireland 1868: PONDERSBRIDGE, a hamlet in the parish of Stanground, hundred of Norman-Cross, county Huntingdon. This hamlet was later transferred to the parish of Farcet when it was formed in 1866.

In 1870–72, John Marius Wilson's Imperial Gazetteer of England and Wales described Pondersbridge like this: PONDERS-BRIDGE, a place in Whittlesey parish, Cambridge; in the fens, near Ely and Peterborough railway, 3 miles W of Whittlesey. A small church was recently erected here by S. Staffwith, Esq.

The Comprehensive Gazetteer of England and Wales, 1894-5 described Ponds Bridge, Cambridgeshire like this: Ponds Bridge, an ecclesiastical parish formed in 1866 from portions of the parishes of Stanground and Ramsey in Hunts and Whittlesea in Cambridgeshire, 3 miles NW from St Mary's station on the Holme and Ramsey branch of the G.N.R., and 6 SE from Peterborough. Post town, Ramsey; money order and telegraph office, Whittlesea. Population in Hunts, 232; in Cambridge, 391. The living is a vicarage in the diocese of Ely; net value, £144 with residence, in the gift of the Bishop of Ely. The church, erected in 1866, is an edifice of stone in the Decorated style, consisting of chancel, nave, S transept, and bell-turret.

Kelly's Directory of Huntingdonshire (1898) described: POND’S BRIDGE is an ecclesiastical parish formed September 18, 1866, from portions of the parishes of Stanground, Ramsey and Whittlesea, surrounding the border line of the counties of Cambridge and Huntingdon, 6 miles south-east from Peterborough, 3 miles north-west from St. Mary's station on the Holme and Ramsey branch of the Great Northern railway, 3 south from Whittlesea, and 6 north from Ramsey, in the Northern division of the county, Ramsey petty sessional division, rural deanery of St. Ives, archdeaconry of Huntingdon and diocese of Ely. The church of St. Thomas, erected by subscription in 1866, is a building of stone in the Decorated style, consisting of chancel, nave, south transept and a bell turret carried on a buttress at the north-west angle, and containing 1 bell: in the chancel are a piscina and sedilia and four stained windows: the font consists of an octagonal basin on four alabaster shafts, and is richly carved: there are 300 sittings. The register dates from September, 1871. Up to July 14, 1867, baptisms solemnized in the licensed school room at Pond's Bridge were entered in the register of Ramsey St. Mary's, but from July 14, 1867 (inclusive), up to Aug. 13th, 1871 (inclusive), in the register of Whittlesey St. Mary's; since 1871 such baptisms have been entered in the Pond's Bridge register. The living is a vicarage, net yearly value £124, with residence, in the gift of the Bishop of Ely, and held since 1897 by the Rev. William Henry Hampton L.Th. of Durham University. There is a church mission room, 2 ½ miles from the church, in which divine service is held and a Sunday school is carried on. The principal landowners are Lord De Ramsay, the trustees of the late J. W. Childers esq. of Cantley, Doncaster, and Lord Saye and Sele, of Broughton Castle, Banbury. The soil is black loam; subsoil, peat. The chief crops are wheat, oats and potatoes. The area is 5,500 acres; the population in 1891 was 623. Pond's Bridge parish school (mixed), built in 1872, for 100 children; average attendance, 96; in the school is a stained memorial window, formerly in the old mission room, & erected to Samuel Staffurth, of Ramsey, who built the first school in this district in 1844: he died in 1858 & the window was placed by his widow.

Kelly's Directory of Cambridgeshire (1904) described: POND’S BRIDGE, about 3 miles south, is an ecclesiastical parish, formed is Sept. 1866, from the parishes of St. Andrew, Whittlesey, and Bamsey and Stanground, in Hunts, but as the principal part of the parish is in Hunts; the population of the portion in Cambridgeshire in 1901 was 420.

== See also ==
- List of places in Cambridgeshire
- Robert Bevill (1572–1634), MP who commissioned the cut in the 17th century
