= 1877 Huntingdonshire by-election =

UK Parliamentary by-election

The 1877 Huntingdonshire by-election was fought on 29 June 1877. The by-election was fought due to the death of the incumbent Conservative MP, Henry Carstairs Pelly. It was won by the Conservative candidate Viscount Mandeville.

1877 Huntingdonshire by-election (1 seat)
Party	Candidate	Votes	%	±%
Conservative	George Montagu	1,468	51.0	−21.4
Liberal	Henry Wentworth-FitzWilliam	1,410	49.0	+21.4
Majority		58	2.0	−4.7
Turnout		2,878	76.8	0.0
Registered electors		3,748		
Conservative hold		Swing	-21.4	
