= Charles Thornhill =

English cricketer

Personal information
- Full name: Charles Thornhill
- Born: 1814; Hemingford Grey, Huntingdonshire, England
- Died: 31 August 1881 (aged 66/67); Castlebellingham, Ireland
- Batting: Unknown
- Relatives: George Thornhill (brother); John Thornhill (brother)

Domestic team information
- Years: Team
- 1837–1840: Cambridge University

Career statistics
Competition	First-class
Matches	6
Runs scored	136
Batting average	13.60
100s/50s	–/–
Top score	32
Catches/stumpings	2/–
- Source: Cricinfo, 25 January 2023

Charles Thornhill (1814 – 31 August 1881) was an English cricketer who played in six matches for Cambridge University that have since been judged to have been first-class. He was born at Hemingford Grey, Huntingdonshire and died at Milestown, Castlebellingham, County Louth, Ireland. His precise date of birth is not known.

Thornhill was the son of George Thornhill, a Huntingdonshire landowner who became Member of Parliament for Huntingdonshire from 1837 to his death in 1852. He was educated at Eton College and Emmanuel College, Cambridge. As a cricketer, he played as a middle-order batsman, though it is not known if he was right- or left-handed. He appeared for Cambridge University in one or two matches each season from 1837 to 1840 and he made, by the standards of the time, some good scores: against the Cambridge Town Club in 1838, for instance, he top-scored with 32 out of a total of 99 in the first innings. But he was not picked for the Cambridge side in the University Match against Oxford University in any of his last three seasons, and therefore never won a Blue.

Thornhill graduated from Cambridge University with a Bachelor of Arts degree in 1841, and this converted to a Master of Arts in 1845. His post-Cambridge career is not clear: in the directory of Cambridge alumni, he is cited as formerly a captain in the 14th King's Light Dragoons, but it also states that after graduation, when that regiment was sent on a 20-year tour of duty in India, Thornhill was ordained into the Church of England as a deacon, serving as curate at Wark on Tyne in 1842 and 1843. At his death in 1881 in Ireland, he was noted in a newspaper as having been formerly the vicar of Burwell, Cambridgeshire.

Several of his family were also cricketers: his brother George Thornhill played in first-class matches for Cambridge University, while another brother John appeared twice in first-class games for the Marylebone Cricket Club (MCC); other brothers, and George's three sons, played in minor matches.
