= Lady Olivia Sparrow =

Anglo-Irish landowner and philanthropist (1775–1863)

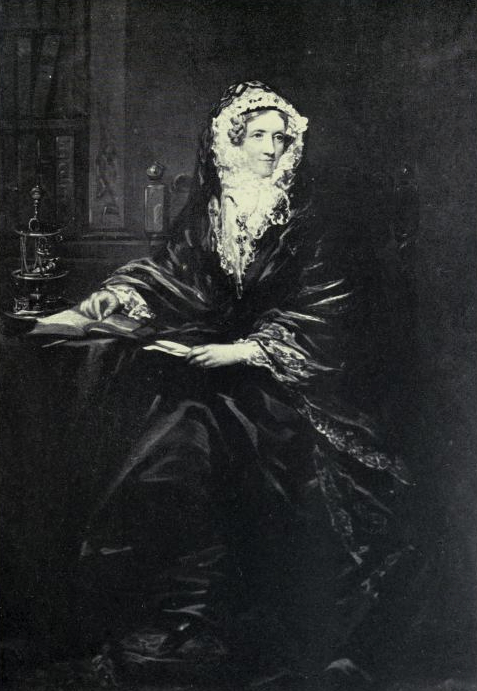
Lady Olivia Sparrow, 1854 engraving

Lady Olivia Sparrow (née Acheson) (1775–1863) was an Anglo-Irish landowner and philanthropist, widowed in 1805. She was a prominent evangelical, belonging to 29 societies engaged in related causes, and a friend of both Hannah More and William Wilberforce. She also brokered the marriage between Arthur Wellesley and Kitty Pakenham, the future Duke and Duchess of Wellington.

== Early life ==
She was the eldest daughter of Arthur Acheson, 1st Earl of Gosford and his wife Millicent Pole, daughter of Lieut.-Gen. Edward Pole.

Marcus Beresford in 1801 enclosed a letter from Olivia in one of his own to Arthur Wellesley in India, of 1801, that also mentioned Kitty Pakenham, Olivia's close friend. This missive is considered the first step in the eventual marriage of 1806 between Arthur and Kitty.

With her father, Lady Olivia was a sponsor of the nonconformist minister Ezekiel Blomfield. She was widowed in 1805. After her father's death in 1807, her religious views moved further towards an evangelical position, in a gradual conversion: she has been called an "extreme Evangelical Tory".

In 1808 the painter Cornelius Varley made a tour in Ireland, at Lady Olivia's invitation. During the period 1808 to 1814 of his time in Ireland, Gaspare Gabrielli carried out fresco work at Tandragee Castle which she owned; it later passed to the Montagu family.

In 1814 Lady Olivia went to the Lake District, in a party including John Bowdler the Younger and George Gough-Calthorpe, 3rd Baron Calthorpe, a follower and political supporter of William Wilberforce. They visited Robert Southey at Keswick. Lord Calthorpe and Lady Olivia also visited William Wordsworth at Rydal Mount on 29 September. Lady Beaumont relayed in an 1815 letter to Wordsworth the comment of Christopher Wordsworth, his brother, that "they belong to the powerful Evangelical sect, and her ardour will not rest in silence." On the return journey, the party went to see James Montgomery in Sheffield, with an introduction from Southey.

Robert, Lady Olivia's teenage son, was an invalid, and in 1817 she built a villa in Villafranca (now Villefranche-sur-mer, France), at that point in the Kingdom of Sardinia. Her hopes that it would afford a cure for his condition were not fulfilled, but she continued to visit it to 1824. Elizabeth Gordon, Duchess of Gordon, at that time the Marchioness of Huntly, visited Lady Olivia's house in Paris in 1822. It was a milestone in an evangelical conversion, that occurred at Kimbolton Castle.

According to D. J. O'Donoghue's account of his 1825 Irish tour, Sir Walter Scott was fascinated by the life and career of 17th-century County Armagh outlaw, or Rapparee, Count Redmond O'Hanlon. Hoping to make him the protagonist of an adventure novel, Scott corresponded with Lady Olivia, as her estate at Tandragee included one of the main regions of O'Hanlon's activities. Although Scott asked Lady Olivia to obtain as much information as possible about O'Hanlon, he was forced to give up on the project after finding documentation too scanty.

== Resident of Brampton, Huntingdonshire ==
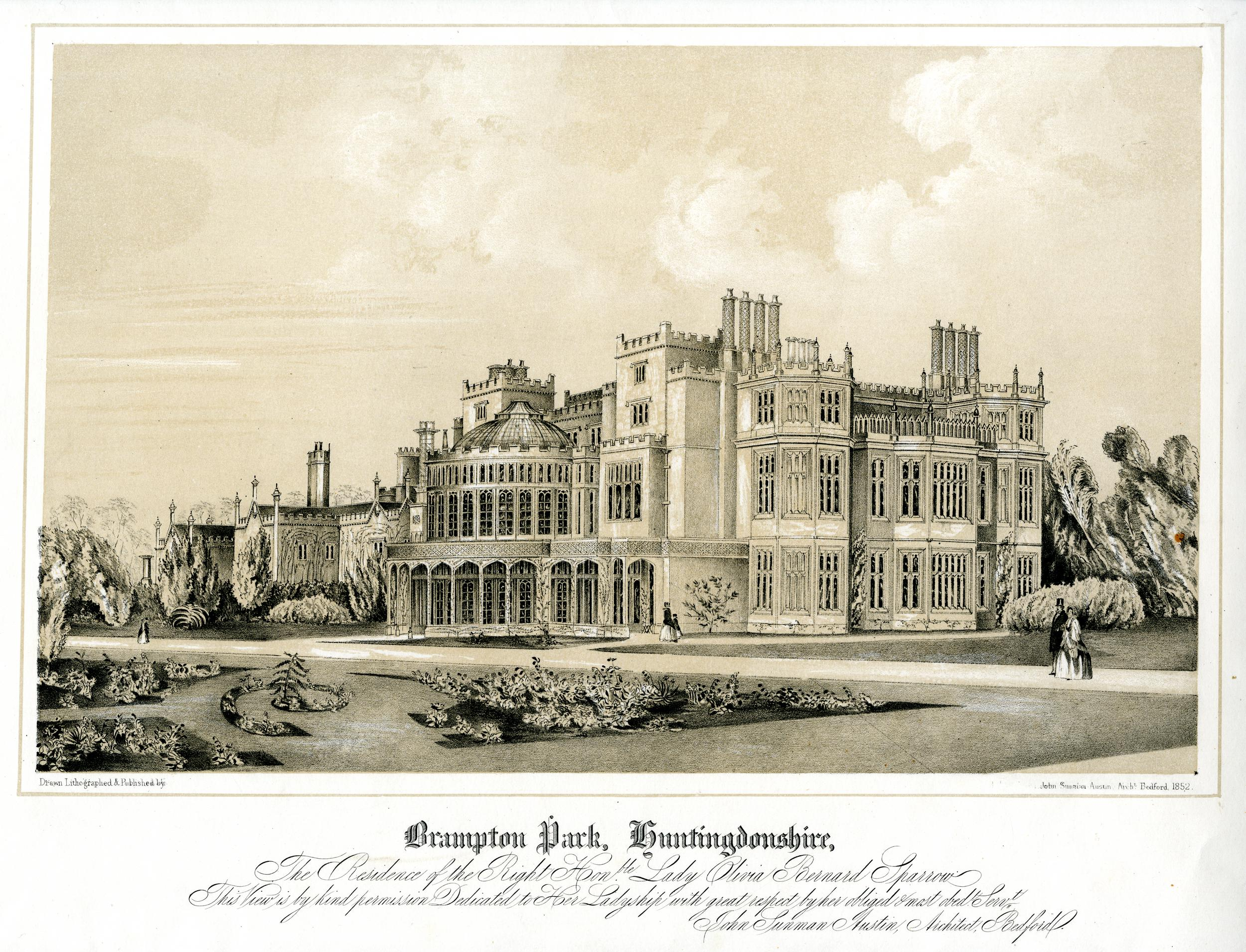
Brampton Park, 1852 engraving

William Wilberforce and his wayward son William Wilberforce the younger visited Lady Olivia at Brampton Park, Huntingdonshire, around 1819/20. She intervened at the time of the 1820 general election by backing as second Tory candidate for the Huntingdonshire seat Francis Henry William Needham, second son of Francis Needham, 1st Earl of Kilmorey, as did Lord Frederick Montagu. The suggestion was unwelcome to William Henry Fellowes, the sitting Tory in the two-member seat, which he shared with the Whig Lord John Russell, feeling that Montagu's nephew Lord Mandeville would then shortly supplant him. There was no contest.

Her daughter's marriage settlement, carefully thought through in 1822 when she married Lord Mandeville, brought together the Sparrow family properties in Huntingdonshire and large rents at Tandragee, County Armagh with the Montagu estate at Kimbolton, then also in Huntingdonshire. The married couple resided at Brampton Park and Kimbolton.

In 1825, Lady Olivia used the architect John Buonarotti Papworth to improve the house at Brampton Park. In 1831 she was listed as patron of the three Huntingdonshire parishs Hemingford Abbas (Hemingford Abbots), Graffham and Little Stukeley. Joseph John Gurney visited Brampton Park in 1826 and saw César Malan of Geneva there.

Mandeville's religious views were similar to those of Lady Olivia. He attended the Albury conferences, and gave a noted lecture there in 1829. The year 1831 saw the founding of the Catholic Apostolic Church (Irvingites), by Edward Irving and Mary Campbell. She married William R. Caird, and came to Brampton Park, and also visited Albury Park owned by Henry Drummond. In the account given by John Henry Blunt, Caird was a lawyer's clerk, and was employed by Lady Olivia as a lay missionary.

In 1832 Lady Olivia and Louisa Montagu, Countess of Sandwich both put up £300 to support a Tory candidate who could defeat John Bonfoy Rooper for the Huntingdonshire seat. She employed Matthew Habershon to build half-timbered cottages at Brampton, from around 1837.

== Schools ==
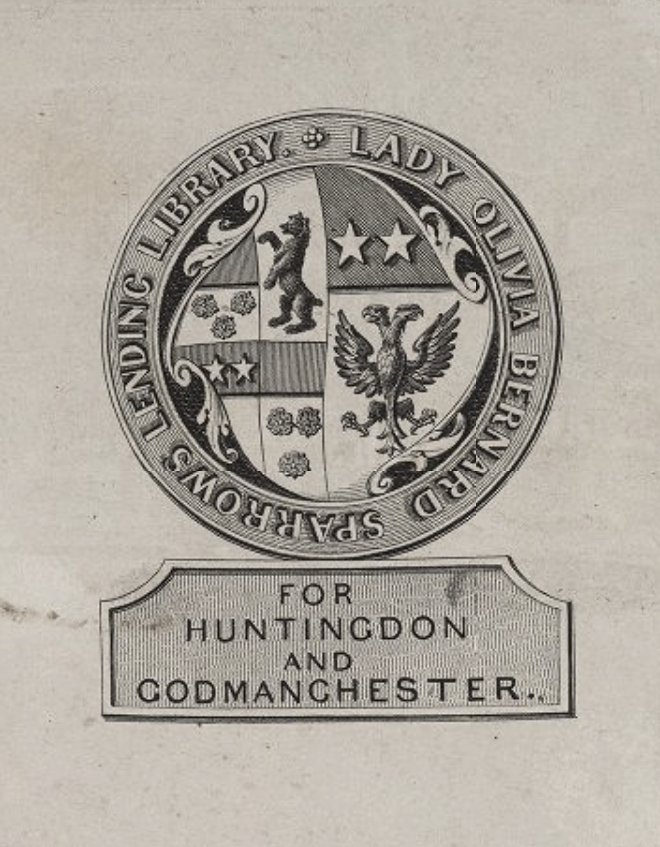
Armorial bookplate of Lady Olivia Bernard Sparrow's Lending Library for Huntingdon and Godmanchester

Lady Olivia also used John Buonarotti Papworth to work on schools in the Brampton, Huntingdonshire area. The schools sometimes carried the initials OBS, for Olivia Bernard Sparrow, a double-barrelled version of her married name. In 1835 she employed Ridley Haim Herschell to oversee her schools, starting with one in Leigh, Essex. He moved on to Brampton in mid-1836; in the Grange Hotel, Lady Olivia founded a girls' school, the building later becoming Brampton Grange. Then, to avoid the ague, Herschell took a position at a chapel in Lothbury. At Leigh, Lady Olivia encountered opposition to her schools, in the form of Robert Eden, who was Rector there from 1837 to 1852, a High Churchman with an interest in elementary education. Charles Blomfield, the Bishop of London, gave Eden the role of inspector of schools in Essex, for which he trained by accompanying Edward Feild. She withdrew her schools from his pastoral care; he published in 1847 A Clergyman's Defence of His Schools. William Roberts supported her position in a letter to The Record, regarding it as justified by the threat posed by Tractarianism. The Record in 1847 had detected Tractarianism at work also in Marlborough College, founded 1843. It rebuked Eden for trying to supplant Lady Olivia Sparrow's schools with ones of his own.

== Associations ==
Around 1813, Lady Olivia struck up a significant friendship with Hannah More. They had corresponded since 1812. A letter of 1815 from More to Olivia refers to a visit she had with Daniel Wilson accompanying Olivia's son Robert. After More's death in 1833, Lady Olivia supplied letters for her biographer William Roberts. Letters were acquired for the Egerton Collection, now at the British Library, in 1865. In 1858 Mendip Annals by Patty More (Martha More 1750–1819, Hannah's sister) appeared edited by Arthur Roberts, son of William Roberts, and it was dedicated to Lady Olivia.

Lady Olivia spread her religious views within her family. By 1816, Mary, Countess of Gosford, Lady Olivia's sister-in-law—doubly: she was sister of Lady Olivia's late husband Robert, and wife of Lady Olivia's brother Archibald Acheson, 2nd Earl of Gosford—found home life with Archibald at Worlingham Hall too much. She took lodgings in Lowestoft, where her friend Lady Byron became her neighbour after Lord Byron had left her. Lady Olivia followed up by introducing Lady Byron to Francis Cunningham, vicar of Lowestoft; in consequence Lady Byron came to be on good terms with John William Cunningham, brother to Francis and a Clapham Sect evangelical who was vicar of Harrow. Mary's daughter Lady Olivia Acheson was one of many to whom Lady Byron confided part of the story of her marriage to Byron.

Around 1826 Edward Irving dined with Lady Olivia, at her house in London. Joseph Wolff, newly arrived in the city, came to find Irving there. He encountered Lady Georgiana Walpole, whom he married in 1827. She was a younger daughter of Horatio Walpole, 2nd Earl of Orford.

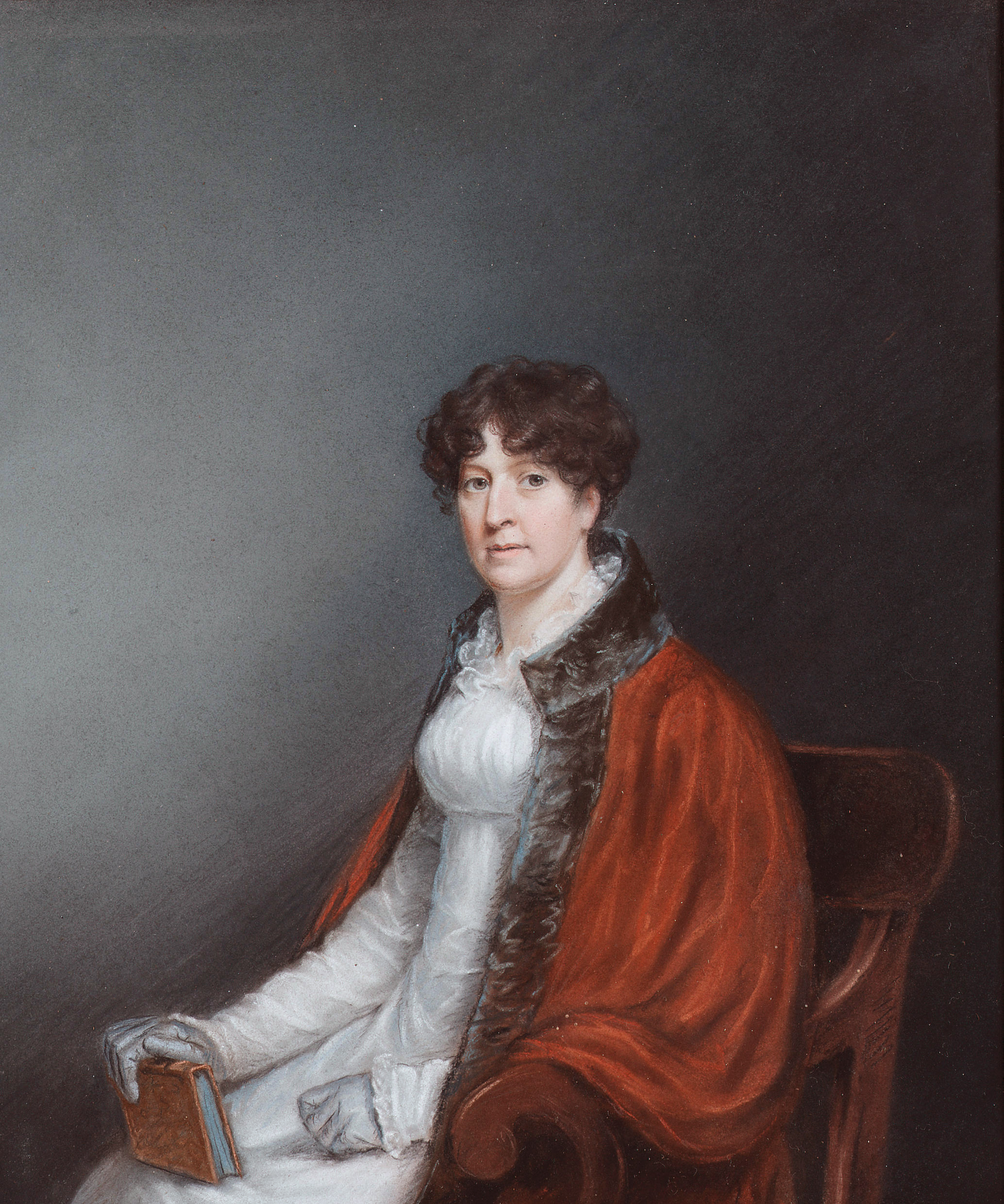
Lady William Bentinck

Lady Olivia's sister Lady Mary married Lord William Bentinck, who began seven years as Governor-General of India in 1828. Interested in the "conversion of the heathen", Lady Olivia hosted gatherings to discuss missionary work, before the Bentincks departed. This was because Mary—Lady William Bentinck—had met Jean-Antoine Dubois in Paris, and adopted some of his ideas. Discussions were held to remedy the situation at her house in Durnford Street, Plymouth, before the party sailed. They involved her brother Lord Gosford, John Hatchard of St. Andrew's, Plymouth, the Rev. John Hawker, Sir Harry Verney, 2nd Baronet, and others. They read the Thirty Years' Experience in India by Dubois, and the reply to it by James Hough (1789–1847), chaplain at Palayamkottai; which Mary took with her to India.

In 1848 Lady Olivia nominated as vicar of Wyton the Rev. Edward Bird (died 1858), whose previous tenure at St Thomas's Church, Birmingham had aroused serious opposition because of his sabbatarian views; he was a Cambridge graduate who had been a barrister in Bengal before being ordained in his early 30s. The traveller Isabella Bird was his daughter by his second wife Dora Lawson, and initially lived with her mother in Edinburgh. Isabella befriended Lady Jane Hay, daughter of George Hay, 8th Marquess of Tweeddale and later wife of Richard Taylor, and niece of Lady Olivia. In the period of the mid-1850s, after she had travelled to the United States and before her father's death, Isabella stayed at Wyton rectory, and would often ride over to Brampton Park with a neighbour, Mrs George Brown, to visit Lady Olivia. A warm friendship developed.

== Family ==
Olivia married in 1797 Robert Bernard Sparrow, son of the Member of Parliament Robert Sparrow (1741–1822). At Westminster School in the late 1780s, he had bullied Robert Southey, with whom he had shared a room at Ottley's house for boarders. His mother Mary died in 1793, by which time he had inherited the estates of his uncle Sir Robert Bernard, 5th Baronet, including Brampton Park, Tandragee Castle in Armagh, and the manors of Leigh-on-Sea and Hadleigh, Essex. He was an army officer, in 1794 a major in the 70th Foot.

Violence by Sparrow is the subject of a number of accounts. Réamonn Ó Muirí comments that "It is not easy to clarify the incident of Sparrow's killing of Captain Lucas." Sparrow was tried and convicted for murder by the Armagh assizes. In an account in the Anti-Jacobin in 1810, he produced a pardon and was released. The commentary associates the incident with an attempt to arrest James Coigly. The victim is identified as Captain William Lucas (died August 1797, of wounds "incurred in a duel" with Colonel Robert Sparrow of Tandragee), fifth son of Edward Lucas of Castle Shane, Member of the Irish Parliament for County Monaghan. Some later garbling of the incident is attributed to the version in Francis Plowden's 1803 Historical Review of the State of Ireland.

In 1797 Sparrow was High Sheriff of Armagh. Early in the year, troops under his command killed John Birch, a United Irishman. There is an account of Sparrow interrupting Birch's wake with an armed force, and violently detaining a group of mourners; it is in A View of the Present State of Ireland, a pamphlet of 1797 by "An Observer". Ó Muirí takes the view that the author was James Coigly; Richard Robert Madden attributed it to an unnamed magistrate in northern Ireland, and Henry Cleary to Arthur O'Connor.

Sparrow was an officer of the 111th Regiment of Foot; and in 1804, ranked Colonel, was appointed brevet Brigadier-General serving under Sir William Myers, 1st Baronet in the West Indies. He died on 29 August 1805. He was buried at Johnson's Ghut Cemetery in Tortola. A monument to him by Francis Chantrey was placed in Worlingham Church, Suffolk. There was also a tablet placed in Brampton church, with information (not all consistent with the other monument): that he had died of fever on a ship returning to England from Barbados, and was buried on Tortola.

Their son, Robert Acheson Bernard St. John Sparrow, died at Nice on 3 March 1818, at the age of 19. Their daughter Millicent was involved in her mother's charitable concerns, supervised by Lewis Way. In the period 1816 to 1822 she was close to Lord William Bentinck, through visits and correspondence, married to her aunt Mary. She married in 1822 Lord Mandeville, and from 1843 was Duchess of Manchester.

=== Death of Millicent and aftermath ===
Millicent died in 1848, and litigation ensued between Lady Olivia and George Montagu, 6th Duke of Manchester. Lady Olivia went to Alexander Haldane for legal advice, and in 1849 retained him as auditor for her estates. With the bulk from Huntingdonshire, her annual rental income came to around £11,000. The litigation did not go well, and Haldane left the auditor position after around eight years.
