= Collett Leventhorpe =

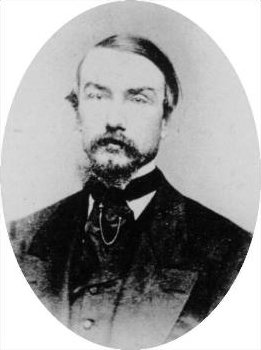
- Born: May 15, 1815; Exmouth, Devon, England
- Died: December 1, 1889 (aged 74); Wilkes County, North Carolina
- Burial place: Lenoir, North Carolina
- Military career
- Allegiance: United Kingdom; Confederate States of America
- Branch: 14th Regiment of Foot; Confederate States Army
- Service years: 1832–1842 (UK); 1861–1865 (CSA)
- Rank: Captain (UK); Brigadier General (CSA)
- Conflicts: American Civil War; Battle of White Hall; Battle of Gettysburg

Collett Leventhorpe (May 15, 1815 – December 1, 1889) was a brigadier general in the Confederate States Army during the American Civil War.

== Early life ==
Collett Leventhorpe was born on the 15th of May, 1815 to Thomas Leventhorpe and Mary Collett in Exmouth, Devon, England. Thomas died, probably of tuberculosis, about nine weeks after Collett's birth. Leventhorpe's ancestry could be traced back to the 14th century and was connected to royalty through marriage and service. His older brother Thomas Leventhorpe was a first-class cricketer for Cambridge University.

Leventhorpe studied at Winchester College until the age of fourteen. For the next three years he was educated by a private tutor.

In 1832 Leventhorpe purchased the rank of ensign in the 14th Regiment of Foot (the Buckinghamshire's), in the army of King William IV. Leventhorpe was stationed in Ireland for the next three years. He purchased a lieutenancy on the 2nd of November 1835, and was stationed in the British West Indies. After several years of duty there he spent a year in Canada. Leventhorpe reached the level of Captain of Grenadiers, on the 16th of November, 1842. He then transferred to the 18th Regiment of Foot and on the 24th of October, 1842 he sold his Captaincy in order to travel to South Carolina on business for an English company.

== Antebellum life ==
In 1843, while on an extended holiday in the United States, Leventhorpe traveled to Asheville, North Carolina, where he met his future wife, Louisa Bryan, daughter of General Edmund Bryan, of Rutherfordton, NC.

Leventhorpe entered the Medical College of Charleston in Charleston, South Carolina. He graduated at the top of his class then married Louisa on April 1, 1849, and the couple made their home in Rutherfordton. Leventhorpe never practiced medicine. In 1849, Leventhorpe applied for and was granted United States citizenship.

== Civil War ==
When North Carolina seceded Leventhorpe offered his military services to his adopted state. His community standing and military background won him the rank of colonel in the 34th North Carolina Infantry. He spent the early months of the War drilling and disciplining the regiment and by December he was given temporary command of a brigade. During the winter of 1861-62 he was at Fort Branch near Hamilton, North Carolina guarding the Roanoke River and the Weldon Railroad Bridge. In April 1862 he was transferred to the 11th North Carolina, elected its colonel and was sent to the Atlantic coast to head the District of Wilmington. Later that year he manned the defenses along Virginia's Blackwater River. Returning to North Carolina in December, he led his troops impressively at the Battle of White Hall, which slowed Federals under Brigadier General John G. Foster in their advance toward Goldsboro, North Carolina. In mid-December, Leventhorpe's 11th North Carolina was attached to the brigade of Brig. Gen. J. Johnston Pettigrew. During this period, Leventhorpe complained that he was being held back from higher command because of his foreign birth and lack of political connections, though he was offered a command in the cavalry but declined it due to his lack of experience in that branch. After helping repulse an attack during the Siege of Washington, in April 1863, Pettigrew's Brigade joined General Robert E. Lee's Army of Northern Virginia for the Gettysburg campaign as part of Major General Henry Heth's division in Lieutenant General A. P. Hill's Corps. With the rest of Heth's command, the 11th North Carolina participated in the July 1 fighting at the Battle of Gettysburg. Leventhorpe was seriously wounded in fighting against the Iron Brigade after flanking the 19th Indiana south of Herbst's Woods. He was wounded in the left arm, shattering the bone, and hip and was removed from the field. Leventhorpe was captured by Union cavalry during the retreat to Virginia. The Union surgeon tending to him detected that gangrene had set in his wound and suggested amputation but Leventhorpe refused, so submitted to allowing the surgeon to cauterize the wound with nitric acid and Leventhorpe refused anesthesia, saying he "would have died, rather than let an enemy see that a Confederate Officer could not endure anything without a complaint." His arm discharged bone fragments for three months. He survived the operation, but was held at Fort McHenry and Point Lookout for eight months before he was exchanged, with friends in England sending him money to purchase necessities while held in prison. After he was released, he resigned his commission with the 11th North Carolina and took command of one of the North Carolina Home Guard brigades tracking down deserters. He was later commissioned brigadier general of state troops and he defended the Roanoke River, Fort Branch, and the Petersburg & Weldon Railroad. His state generalship made him the Confederacy's only English born soldier to hold that rank. On February 18, 1865, he also became a Brigadier General in the Confederate ranks, but 3 weeks later he refused the appointment, choosing instead to remain in state service. His troops defended Raleigh when Major General William T. Sherman marched through North Carolina. He and his men retreated to Greensboro, where they surrendered on April 26, 1865.

== Post-War career ==
After the war, Leventhorpe was involved in several business enterprises and politics following the War. He and his wife moved to New York City and also traveled frequently to England. Leventhorpe was sympathetic to the Ku Klux Klan during Radical Reconstruction, though no record exists of his joining the Klan. He eventually settled in Wilkes County, North Carolina, where he died on the 1st of December, 1889.

== See also ==
- List of American Civil War generals (Confederate)

== Notes ==
Party political offices
Preceded by Samuel W. Burgin	Democratic nominee for North Carolina State Auditor; 1872	Succeeded by Samuel L. Love
