= James Rust =

British politician

Member of Parliament for Huntingdonshire
- In office 2 October 1855 – 7 May 1859 Serving with Edward Fellowes; John Heathcote (April – July 1857)
- Preceded by: Edward Fellowes; William Montagu
- Succeeded by: Edward Fellowes; Robert Montagu

Personal details
- Born: 1798
- Died: 24 July 1875 (aged 77)
- Party: Conservative

James Rust (1798 – 24 July 1875) was a British Conservative politician.

Rust was first elected Conservative MP for Huntingdonshire at a by-election in 1855—caused by the succession of William Montagu to 7th Duke of Manchester. He was again elected at the 1857 general election, although the vote unusually resulted in a triple return with his fellow incumbent Conservative MP Edward Fellowes securing the same number of votes as the Whig cricketer John Heathcote. After scrutiny, Heathcote was declared unduly elected a few months later. Rust held the seat until the 1859 general election when he did not stand.

Parliament of the United Kingdom
Preceded by Edward Fellowes; William Montagu	Member of Parliament for Huntingdonshire; 1855–1859; With: Edward Fellowes; John Heathcote (April – July 1857)	Succeeded by Edward Fellowes; Robert Montagu
