= Sir Henry Pelly, 3rd Baronet =

Henry Pelly MP

Member of Parliament for Huntingdonshire
- In office 15 February 1874 – 04 June 1877 Serving with Edward Fellowes
- Preceded by: Edward Fellowes; Robert Montagu
- Succeeded by: Edward Fellowes; George Montagu

Personal details
- Born: 23 April 1844 Barnet, Hertfordshire
- Died: 4 June 1877 (aged 33)
- Party: Conservative
- Spouse: Lilian Harriet Charteris (m. 1872)
- Children: Annie Evelyn Pelly; Constance Lilian Pelly
- Parent(s): John Pelly; Johanna Jane Carstairs

Sir Henry Carstairs Pelly, 3rd Baronet (24 April 1844 - 4 June 1877) was a Conservative Party politician.

== Parliamentary career ==
Pelly was elected Conservative MP for Huntingdonshire in 1874, but died before completing a full parliamentary term in 1877.

== Baronetage ==
Pelly succeeded to 3rd Baronet of Upton upon his father John Pelly's death on 20 December 1864.

== Personal life ==
Pelly married Lady Lilian Harriet Charteris, daughter of Francis Charteris, 10th Earl of Wemyss on 27 November 1872.

== Other activities ==
During his life, Pelly was a Justice of the Peace, a Deputy Lieutenant, and captain in the 2nd Regiment of Life Guards.

Parliament of the United Kingdom
Preceded by Edward Fellowes and Robert Montagu	Member of Parliament for Huntingdonshire; 1874 – 1877; With: Edward Fellowes	Succeeded by Edward Fellowes and George Montagu
Baronetage of the United Kingdom
Preceded by John Pelly	Baronet (of Upton); 1864–1877	Succeeded by Harold Pelly
