= Sidney Peters =

Sidney John Peters (2 December 1885 – 9 January 1976) was a Liberal politician and solicitor in the United Kingdom.

== Education and family ==
Peters was born in Cambridge. He was educated at Cambridge and County High School and studied law and music at Fitzwilliam Hall, Cambridge (now Fitzwilliam College), graduating MA and LLB, and a further MA and doctorate in law (LLD) at Trinity College Dublin. In 1912 he married Essie Mills, the daughter of a Cambridge Alderman. They had one son, John and one daughter, Jean.

== Public career ==
Peter was Secretary and Legal Adviser to the Central Council Forage Department for Civil Supplies during the First World War and was Executive Officer, Controlling Department at the Board of Trade.

== Parliament ==
He served as member of parliament (MP) for Huntingdonshire from the 1929 general election until 1945, preceding David Renton. Peters was originally elected as a Liberal, but later changed his allegiance to the National Liberal Party. He served as Parliamentary Private Secretary to the Secretary to the Mines Department, and Parliamentary Private Secretary to the Minister of Labour to 1940.

Parliament of the United Kingdom
Preceded by Sir Charles Murchison	Member of Parliament for Huntingdonshire; 1929 – 1945	Succeeded by David Renton
