= Thomas Leventhorpe =

English cricketer and cleric

Personal information
- Full name: Thomas William Leventhorpe
- Born: 1813; London, England
- Died: 12 August 1860 (aged 46/47); Yelling, Huntingdonshire, England
- Batting: Unknown

Domestic team information
- Years: Team
- 1835: Cambridge University

Career statistics
Competition	First-class
Matches	1
Runs scored	0
Batting average	0.00
100s/50s	–/–
Top score	0
Balls bowled	–
Wickets	–
Bowling average	–
5 wickets in innings	–
10 wickets in match	–
Best bowling	–
Catches/stumpings	–/–
- Source: Cricinfo, 13 December 2013

The Reverend Thomas William Leventhorpe (1813 – 12 August 1860) was an English cleric and cricketer.

== Life ==
The son of Thomas Leventhorpe and Mary Collett, Leventhorpe was educated at Winchester College, before attending Jesus College, Cambridge.

While studying at Cambridge, Leventhorpe made a single appearance in first-class cricket for Cambridge University against the Marylebone Cricket Club at Parker's Piece in 1835. In a match which the Marylebone Cricket Club won by 88 runs, he was dismissed for a duck twice, firstly by Charles Parnther in Cambridge University's first-innings, and then by John Bayley in their second-innings. Leventhorpe's batting style is unknown.

After leaving Jesus College in 1839, Leventhorpe became the parish priest of a number of churches in Cambridgeshire and Huntingdonshire. He died at Yelling, Huntingdonshire on 12 August 1860.

== Family ==
The American Civil War Confederate general Collett Leventhorpe was Leventhorpe's brother.

In 1845, Leventhorpe married Louisa Rooper, daughter of John Bonfoy Rooper. Rooper Leventhorpe (1850–1940) was their son.
