= David Renton =

British politician (1908–2007)

The Right Honourable The Lord Renton KBE TD PC QC DL
- David Renton

Chairman of the National Liberal Party
- In office 1964–1968
- Preceded by: Colin Thornton-Kemsley
- Succeeded by: Office dissolved

Member of the House of Lords
- Lord Temporal
- Life peerage 11 July 1979 – 24 May 2007

Member of Parliament for Huntingdonshire
- In office 5 July 1945 – 7 April 1979
- Preceded by: Sidney Peters
- Succeeded by: John Major

Personal details
- Born: David Lockhart-Mure Renton; 12 August 1908 Dartford, Kent, England
- Died: 24 May 2007 (aged 98) Huntingdon, Cambridgeshire, England
- Party: Conservative (since 1968)
- Other political affiliations: National Liberal (1945–1968)
- Spouse: Claire Cicely ("Paddy") Duncan (m. 1947; died 1986)
- Children: 3
- Education: Oundle School
- Alma mater: University College, Oxford

David Lockhart-Mure Renton, Baron Renton, KBE, TD, PC, QC, DL (12 August 1908 – 24 May 2007) was a British politician who served for more than six decades in Parliament, 34 years in the House of Commons and then 28 years in the House of Lords.

Renton was Member of Parliament for Huntingdonshire from 1945 to 1979, initially as a Liberal National and then in accordance with the party's successive mergers with the Conservatives, as a "National Liberal and Conservative", then in 1968 he was one of the final three National Liberal MPs who opted to wind up the party and become a full part of the Conservatives. He became a life peer in 1979, and was the oldest member of the House of Lords from 2004 until his death.

== Early life ==
Renton was born in Dartford, England, the son of a surgeon and a nurse. He was educated at Stubbington, Oundle, and University College, Oxford, of which he was made an honorary fellow in 1990. Going up to read medicine, he switched to law. He was president of the Oxford University Liberal Club. He played Rugby fives for the University of Oxford and also played cricket and rugby union for his college. He then entered the Inns of Court to study law.

== Early career ==
Renton was called to the bar from Lincoln's Inn in 1933. He practised as a barrister on the South-east Circuit, with a mixed caseload of civil and criminal law. He was elected as a member of the General Council of the Bar in 1939, and was Treasurer of Lincoln's Inn in 1979, the year he retired from the House of Commons.

Renton joined the Territorial Army in 1938 and was commissioned into the Royal Engineers. He transferred to the Royal Artillery in 1940, and volunteered to serve overseas in 1942. He was posted to the Middle East for three years. Promoted to Major, he served as a legal adviser at GHQ Cairo, before becoming president of the British Military Court of Tripolitania, based in Tripoli, in 1944.

== Career ==
He returned to England in 1945, and was elected as Member of Parliament (MP) for Huntingdonshire in the 1945 general election, as a Liberal National. During his time in the Commons, the party merged with the Conservatives at constituency level (and changed their name to "National Liberal", with Renton using the label "National Liberal and Conservative" in elections from 1950 onwards). In 1968, he was one of the final three National Liberal MPs who opted to wind up the party and become a full part of the Conservatives. He continued to practise law throughout his political career, and became a QC in 1954. He befriended Margaret Roberts (later Thatcher) when she was a student at Lincoln's Inn in 1950. He became a bencher in 1962, and served as Treasurer in 1979. He was Recorder of Rochester from 1963 to 1968 and Recorder of Guildford from 1968 to 1973. He was vice-chairman of the Council of Legal Education from 1968 to 1973, and served as a member of the Senate of Inns of Court.

Renton joined the British delegation to draft the European Convention on Human Rights in 1950. He became a junior minister in the governments of Sir Anthony Eden and Harold Macmillan in the 1950s, serving as Parliamentary Under-Secretary of State at the Ministry of Fuel and Power under Aubrey Jones from 1955 to 1957, and then at the Minister of Power from 1957 to 1958, where he assisted to pass the Clean Air Act. He moved to the Home Office as Parliamentary Under-Secretary of State from 1958 to 1961 and then as Minister of State from 1961 to 1962. Serving under Home Secretary Rab Butler, he pushed through acts including the Life Peerages Act 1958, the Street Offences Act 1958 and the Commonwealth Immigration Act 1962. He was sacked in the Night of the Long Knives in July 1962, but received the consolation of being sworn of the Privy Council. He later sat on a number of House of Commons committees. He was appointed a Knight Commander of the Order of the British Empire (KBE) in 1964, and won an RSPCA bronze medal the same year for rescuing horses and pigs from a fire hear his home.

He supported Britain joining the European Community, but later supported the Save the Pound campaign. In 1971, he was a member of the Kilbrandon Commission, the Royal Commission on the Constitution, which rejected complete self-government for Scotland and Wales, suggesting instead a limited form of devolution. At the invitation of Ted Heath, he chaired the Committee on Preparation of Legislation which reviewed the methods for drafting Acts of Parliament. The Renton Report was published in 1975, recommending drafting that was more based on principles than specific details to address every possible situation.

He served as Deputy Lieutenant for Huntingdonshire in 1962, for Huntingdon and Peterborough in 1964, and for Cambridgeshire in 1974.

He stood down from his Huntingdonshire seat at the 1979 general election, and was created a life peer on 11 July 1979, taking his seat in the House of Lords as Baron Renton, of Huntingdon in the County of Cambridgeshire. His successor as MP for Huntingdonshire was the future Conservative Prime Minister John Major. Renton was a deputy speaker in the House of Lords from 1982 to 1988.

=== Later career ===
Renton was elected president of the Association of Conservative Peers in 1998, unopposed, and became life president in 2003. He was the oldest peer in the House of Lords from 4 April 2004 until his death.

He played cricket for the Lords and Commons Cricket Club until he was 66, and hunted until he was 70. He continued to shoot until he was 91, when he had a heart valve replaced.

He was a leader in the movement to preserve the traditions of the House of Lords, including lifelong membership for members of the Peerage. According to The Washington Post in 2005, Renton maintained that "the genius of the upper house is that it includes world-renowned experts in law, science and the arts who would never run for election", and that "Democracy has its limitations". His memoirs, The Spice of Life, were published in 2006.

== Personal life ==
In July 2003, just short of his 95th birthday, he passed his driving test for the first time. He had been a regular driver since 1934, at a time when there was no formal driving test in the United Kingdom, although he stopped driving some time before he died. In passing his driving test, he became the oldest person to pass the driving test in the United Kingdom.

He married in 1947 Claire Cicely "Paddy" Duncan, a sister of Marjorie Grimston, Countess of Verulam. They had three daughters. His wife died of cancer in 1986. His youngest daughter, Davina, inherited Rett syndrome, which left her severely mentally and physically disabled. She died in October 2006. He was chairman of Mencap from 1978, and president from 1982 to 1988. He and his wife established the charity Demand (Design and Manufacture for Disability) to provide adapted furniture for the disabled.

=== Death ===
Renton died in Abbots Ripton in Cambridgeshire. He was survived by two daughters, Caroline and Clare.

== Arms ==
Coat of arms of David Renton
Crest In front of a horse's head erased Or a hunting horn stringed Azure. Escutcheon Azure a horse forcene on a chief Or a sword point to the dexter Gules between a portcullis chained and hunting horn stringed Azure. Supporters Dexter a lion guardant purpure gorged with a fine chain pendant therefrom a millrind Gold, sinister a stag guardant Proper gorged with a like chain pendant therefrom a fetterlock enclosing a heart Gold. Motto Virtus In Actione Est

Party political offices
Preceded by Colin Thornton-Kemsley	Chairman of the National Liberal Party; 1964–1968	Party dissolved
Parliament of the United Kingdom
Preceded by Sidney Peters	Member of Parliament for Huntingdonshire; 1945–1979	Succeeded by John Major
