= John Thornhill =

English cricketer & clergyman (1815–1875)

Personal information
- Full name: John Thornhill
- Born: 14 July 1815; Hemingford Grey, Huntingdonshire, England
- Died: 28 January 1875 (aged 59); Boxworth, Cambridgeshire, England
- Batting: Unknown
- Relatives: Charles Thornhill (brother); George Thornhill (brother)

Domestic team information
- Years: Team
- 1840–1842: Marylebone Cricket Club

Career statistics
Competition	First-class
Matches	2
Runs scored	19
Batting average	6.33
100s/50s	–/–
Top score	8
Catches/stumpings	–/–
- Source: Cricinfo, 11 May 2021

John Thornhill JP (14 July 1815 – 28 January 1875) was an English first-class cricketer and clergyman.

The son of the politician George Thornhill, he was born in July 1815 at Hemingford Grey, Huntingdonshire. He was educated at Rugby School, before going up to St John's College, Cambridge. After graduating from Cambridge, he took holy orders in the Anglican Church, being ordained as a deacon at Durham Cathedral in 1838. His first ecclesiastical post was at Boxworth in Cambridgeshire, where he was appointed reverend in 1839. Thornhill was from a cricketing family, with his brothers Charles and George both playing first-class cricket. Thornhill himself played two first-class matches for the Marylebone Cricket Club, both against Cambridge University at Cambridge in 1840 and 1842. He scored 19 runs in his two matches, with a highest score of 8. From 1850 he was concurrently the reverend of Childerley, a hamlet to the south of Boxworth. Thornhill was also a justice of the peace for Cambridgeshire. He died at Boxworth in January 1875.
