= Thomas Beville (MP for Huntingdonshire) =

English politician (died c. 1437)

Thomas Beville (died c. 1437) was an English politician.

He served as MP for Huntingdonshire in May 1413, 1415, and 1417.

== Political career ==
He also served as justice of the peace for Huntingdonshire from 8 February 1409 till April 1416, and 8 February 1418 till his death; Sheriff of Cambridgeshire and Huntingdonshire from 14 December 1415 till 30 November 1416, and 23 November 1419 till 16 November 1420; commissioner to raise a royal loan in Huntingdonshire in November 1419; commissioner of oyer and terminer in July 1425 concerning attack on property and servants of the prioress of Hinchingbrooke; commissioner of inquiry in April 1431 concerning persons liable to contribute a royal grant; and tax assessor of Huntingdonshire in January 1436.

== Family ==
He was the younger son and heir of Robert Beville. By 1432, he married Joan and had two sons.
