= Robert Beville =

English politician (1342–c.1409)

Robert Beville (c. 21 September 1342 – c. 1409) was an English politician. He sat as MP for Huntingdonshire in May 1382, and 1399.

== Political career ==
He also served as commissioner of array in Huntingdonshire in April, and July 1377, and March 1380; commissioner to suppress the insurgents of 1381 in June, and December 1381, and in March, and December 1382.

He also served as surveyor and controller of a tax in Huntingdonshire in February 1381 and March 1404.

== Family ==
He was the son and heir of Richard Beville the younger (died by August 1349) of Wood Walton by his wife Elizabeth. He probably married Joan and had at least 2 sons (one predeceased him) including Thomas Beville.
