= Roger Hunt (speaker) =

English politician (died c. 1455)

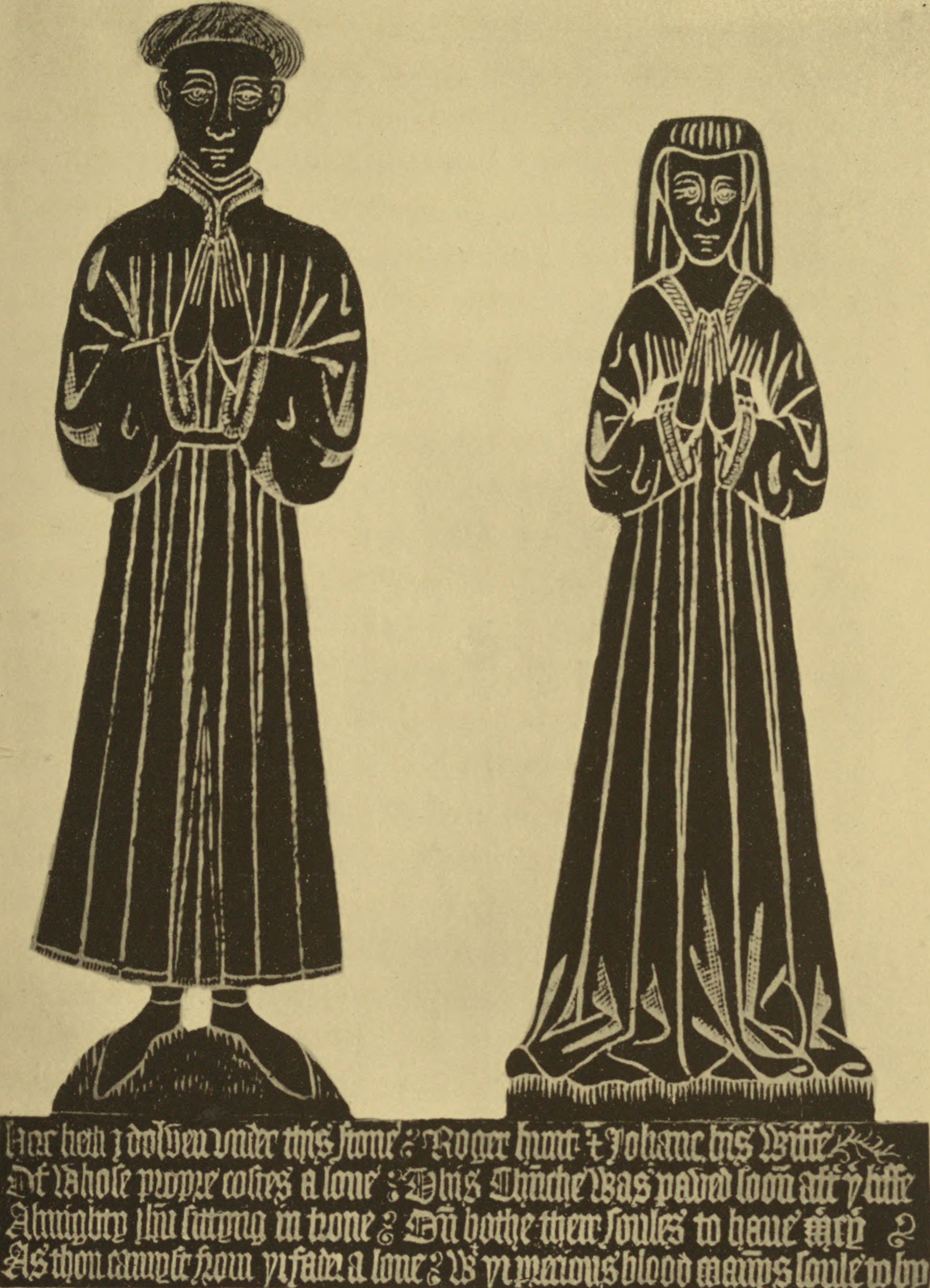
Memorial brass of Roger Hunt in Great Linford Church, Buckinghamshire.

Roger Hunt (died c. 1455) was an English MP and Speaker of the House of Commons.

== Life ==
He was of obscure origins, but acquired the manor of Molesworth in Huntingdonshire and acquired a circle of influential friends such as Sir John Tiptoft and John Mowbray, the future Duke of Norfolk. About 1402, he leased a London house, perhaps while training as a lawyer at Lincoln's Inn, and became royal attorney for the common pleas, under Tiptoft's patronage, from 1408 to 1410.

In 1407, he was returned as knight of the shire for Huntingdonshire, the first of eighteen times he was elected to parliament, being returned on every occasion except one (December 1421) between then and 1433. On three occasions (1414, 1416, and 1420) he chose to represent Bedfordshire, where he had interests at Chawston, instead of Huntingdonshire. He was elected Speaker of the House in 1420 and again in 1433.

Following his parliamentary career he was appointed High Sheriff of Cambridgeshire and Huntingdonshire for 1433 and 1434. He was appointed second baron of the exchequer in 1439 until 1447.

He died about 1455. He had married Margery, whose surname was probably Bullock; they had a son, Roger, who succeeded to his father's estates in July 1456.

Political offices
Preceded by Roger Flower	Speaker of the House of Commons; 1420–1421	Succeeded by Thomas Chaucer
Preceded by Sir John Russell	Speaker of the House of Commons; 1433	Succeeded by John Bowes
