= George Thornhill (cricketer) =

English cricketer

George Thornhill (10 August 1811 – 4 February 1875) was an English cricketer with amateur status who was active from 1831 to 1836. He was born in England and died in Folkestone. He made his debut in 1831 and appeared in seven matches as an unknown handedness batsman whose bowling style is unknown, playing for Cambridge University. He scored 59 runs with a highest score of 11 and took four wickets. Thornhill was the eldest son of George Thornhill (1783–1852), a Huntingdonshire landowner who became Member of Parliament for Huntingdonshire from 1837 to his death in 1852. He was educated at Eton and St John's College, Cambridge. He was High Sheriff of Huntingdonshire in 1869.

Several of his family were also cricketers: his brother Charles Thornhill played for Cambridge University, while another brother John appeared twice in important matches for the Marylebone Cricket Club (MCC); other brothers, and his three sons, played in minor matches.

== Bibliography ==
- Haygarth, Arthur (1996) [1862]. Scores & Biographies, Volume 1 (1744–1826). Kennington: Frederick Lillywhite. ISBN 978-19-00592-23-9.
- Haygarth, Arthur (1997) [1862]. Scores & Biographies, Volume 2 (1827–1840). Kennington: Frederick Lillywhite. ISBN 978-19-00592-23-9.
