= Robert Bevill =

English Member of Parliament

Sir Robert Bevill of Chesterton (September 1572 – 1634) was an English Member of Parliament who represented Huntingdonshire in 1621.
