= Charles Murchison (politician) =

British politician (1872–1952)

Sir Charles Kenneth Murchison
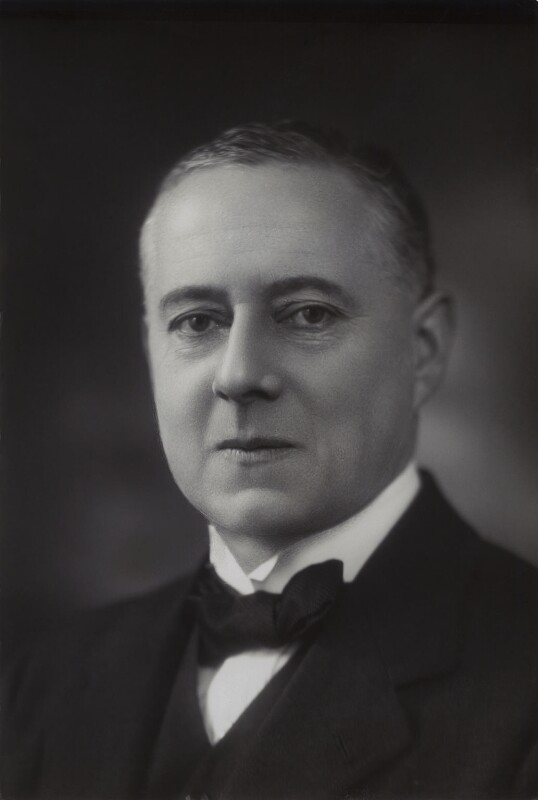
- Murchison in 1925

Member of Parliament for Kingston upon Hull East
- In office 1918–1922

Member of Parliament for Huntingdonshire
- In office 1922–1923
- In office 1924–1929

Personal details
- Born: 22 September 1872
- Died: 17 December 1952 (aged 80)
- Party: Conservative

Sir Charles Kenneth Murchison (22 September 1872 – 17 December 1952) was a British Conservative Party politician.

He was elected at the 1918 general election as Member of Parliament (MP) for Kingston upon Hull East. Standing as a Coalition Conservative, he won the seat with a large majority over the sitting Liberal MP Thomas Ferens.

Murchison did not defend his Hull seat at the 1922 general election, and stood instead in Huntingdonshire. He won the seat, but held it for only a year; at the 1923 general election he was defeated by the Liberal Leonard Costello. Murchison regained the seat from Costello at the general election in October 1924, and was knighted on 18 February 1927. After a further defeat at the 1929 general election, he did not stand for election to the House of Commons again.

Parliament of the United Kingdom
Preceded by Thomas Ferens	Member of Parliament for Kingston upon Hull East; 1918 – 1922	Succeeded by Roger Lumley
Preceded by Oliver Locker-Lampson	Member of Parliament for Huntingdonshire; 1922 – 1923	Succeeded by Leonard Costello
Preceded by Leonard Costello	Member of Parliament for Huntingdonshire; 1924 – 1929	Succeeded by Sidney Peters
