= Leonard Costello =

British politician

- Costello in 1922

Member of Parliament for Huntingdonshire
- In office 7 December 1923 – 9 October 1924
- Preceded by: Charles Murchison
- Succeeded by: Charles Murchison

Personal details
- Born: 25 August 1881
- Died: 2 December 1972 (aged 91)
- Party: Liberal

Sir Leonard Wilfred James Costello (25 August 1881 – 2 December 1972) was an English barrister, college lecturer, soldier and Indian colonial judge who was also a Liberal Party politician.

== Family and education ==
Leonard Costello was born in London, the son of James and Alice Costello. He was educated at Dulwich College and was later president of the Alleyn Club, established in honour of the school's founder. He then went to Peterhouse, Cambridge where he gained BA and LL.B degrees in 1902 and an MA in 1906.

In 1907 he married Winifred Avery, the daughter of Thomas Belgrave and they had two daughters. His first wife died in 1950 and in 1952 he married Joan Barbara Alice Piper (born 4 January 1905), the daughter of George Earl Smith Hewitt; she was the widow of Maurice James Trounce Piper. Joan's death was registered in 1981.

== Legal career ==
Costello was called to the Bar at the Inner Temple in 1903. He then practised on the Midland Circuit from 1903 to 1926. Between 1906 and 1908 he had a position as a lecturer in law at University College, Nottingham. He later went out to India where, from 1926–1940, he was a judge in the High Court in Calcutta. He was Acting Chief Justice of Bengal in 1937 and again 1939. In 1937, he was strongly criticised by the Indian National Congress after remarks he made in a murder trial that the poor education and biased approach of potential jurors made the jury system unsuitable in India. It was widely believed that the jury in the case had made up their mind to find the defendant not guilty despite what Costello regarded as conclusive evidence of guilt. Costello was nevertheless knighted in 1935 for his role as a Bengal judge and was awarded the CBE in 1946.

=== The Bhowal Sanyasi case ===
The Bhawal case ran from 1933 to 1946, creating a sensation across India, with courts involved in London, Calcutta and Dhaka. In a case with echoes of the famous Tichborne Claimant, the court action was concerned with the dispute of inheritance of an estate and the identity of the Second Kumar of Bhawal (a Bengali princeling or zamindar) who was declared dead under mysterious circumstances, and who came back to life after twelve years.

==== Papers ====
A collection of documents relating to the case has been deposited in the library of the University of Exeter. It consists of eight oversize printed portfolios containing photographs of evidence. The items in this collection originate from the Appeal from Original Decree (Sreemati Bibhabati Devi v. Ramendra Narayan Roy), over which Costello presided as Acting Chief of Justice. This part of the trial took place at the High Court of Judicature, Fort William, Bengal, India, 1939. Also included is a box of newspaper cuttings relating to the case as well as court schedule lists, 1939.

=== Legal appointments ===
Costello was a Justice of the Peace in Devon from 1940 onwards. He was a member of the Devon Magistrates Courts Committee from its inception till 1956. He was Deputy Chairman of the County Justices Committee, 1941–46 and chairman from 1946–56. He served as Legal Adviser to the Devon County Army Welfare Services, 1941–46 (for which work he was awarded the Defence Medal). He was Deputy Chairman of Devon Quarter Sessions 1940–1947 and chairman from 1947–1956. He was Chairman of the Devon Branch of the Magistrates' Association 1954–1963 and sometime member of the National Council of the Joint Committee of the Magistrates' Association.

== Soldier ==
Costello was commissioned in the Army Service Corps in January 1916 and after serving in the European theatre in the First World War, resigned his commission as a temporary captain on account of ill-health in December 1918.

== Politics ==
Costello was a founder member of the first Executive Committee of the National League of Young Liberals and he was later the Chairman of the NLYL London Council. In 1910 he stood for election to the London County Council as a member of the Progressive Party in Chelsea. He was a member of the Council of the London Liberal Party, President of Devon and Cornwall Liberal Federation, 1968–71 and President of Tiverton Divisional Liberal Association, 1968–71.

He first stood for Parliament at the January 1910 general election, contesting the Strand Division of Westminster, a safe Unionist seat. From 1912 to 1914 he was prospective Liberal candidate for Islington North but the intervention of the First World War meant he never fought the seat. In 1918 he stood for election in Exeter but as an Independent Asquithian Liberal he was not given the Coalition coupon and lost to the sitting Coalition Conservative, Sir Robert Newman. He fought Exeter again in 1922 again losing to Newman in a straight fight. But at the 1923 general election he switched seats to contest Huntingdonshire, beating the sitting Tory MP, Charles Murchison, by a majority of 1,061 votes. It was an unexpected win, overturning a Tory majority of nearly 5,000 and Murchison put it down to deficiencies in his local party organisation. With the Tories making a renewed effort Costello held the seat for just a year as Murchison won it back at the 1924 general election.

Costello's year in the House of Commons seems to have enough for him as he did not to fight any further Parliamentary campaigns, although he was reported as being one of the Liberal candidates considered for the by-election at Berwick-upon-Tweed in 1941 fought under the wartime truce. In the event a local candidate, George Charles Grey was chosen and was returned unopposed.

== Philanthropy ==
Costello was a tireless supporter of charitable ventures. He served as a member of the Lord Roberts Memorial Workshops, an organisation set up to create employment for wounded ex-servicemen and named after Field Marshal Lord Roberts. He was a member of the Council of the charitable fund-raising event, the Alexandra Rose Day, being its Honorary Treasurer after 1941. He was also Chairman of the Lumley Memorial Trust from 1950 onwards and President of his local Committee of the Cancer Research Campaign, since its inception.

== Other public and civic appointments ==
In 1939 Costello was appointed a member of the National Service Act Appeals Tribunal for England and Wales, a body which heard appeals from those applying to be registered as conscientious objectors when refused permission by local tribunals. He was also Chairman of a Home Office Advisory Committee on Aliens in the Isle of Man in 1941. He was a member of the Managing Committee of Elizabeth Garrett Anderson Hospital, 1941–50; President of the All India and of Calcutta Societies for the Prevention of Cruelty to Animals, 1933–41 and President of the Soc for the Protection of Children in India, 1927–37. He was twice President of the Bengal Flying Club, Calcutta.

== Public service in Devon ==
Costello served as Sheriff of Devon, 1945–46. He was a member of the Rating Appeal Committee, 1940–50, a member of the Devon Standing Joint Committee, 1946 and was vice-chairman from 1952–56. He chaired the General Commissioners of Income Tax for the East Budleigh and Clifton Division of Devon, 1954–64. He was a member of the Exeter Cathedral Restoration Fund Committee, 1946–66 AND served on various Devon committees of the NSPCC, 1949–70. In work connected to his legal background he was a member of the Board of Visitors of HM Prison, Dartmoor, 1950–61 and Chairman of the County Confirming and Compensation Committees, 1951–56. From 1946–1956 he was a member of the Exeter Prison Visiting Justices Committee, 1946–56 and was for five years President of the Conference of Prison and Borstal Visiting Justices. He also served on Devon Agricultural Wages Committee, 1956–62, as Chairman of the Agricultural Land Tribunal for the South West Region of England, 1948–58 and was sometime Chairman of the Directors of Exeter Theatre Co. Ltd. He was President, Devon Old Peoples Welfare Committee; a Commissioner of Income Tax for the East Exminster Division of Devon; Vice-President and Member of Committees, Devon Community Council and Vice-President, Devon Branch of the Forces Help Society.

== Death ==
Costello died at his home, Grantlands, Uffculme, Devon on 2 December 1972, aged 91 years.

== Publications ==
- The Law relating to Engineering. A course of six lectures delivered in 1910–1911 before the Society of Engineers and the Junior Institution of Engineers; London, 1911
- The Profiteering Act, 1919; Stevens & Sons, London, 1919 (jointly with Richard O'Sullivan)
- The pocket law lexicon: explaining technical words, phrases and maxims of the English, Scotch and Roman Law to which is added a complete list of Law Reports, with their Abbreviations; Stevens & Sons, London, 1921

Parliament of the United Kingdom
Preceded by Sir Charles Murchison	Member of Parliament for Huntingdonshire; 1923–1924	Succeeded by Sir Charles Murchison
