= John Sapcote (MP for Huntingdonshire) =

Member of the Parliament of England

John Sapcote (1448–1501) was an English Member of Parliament for Huntingdonshire in 1472.
