= George Montagu, 8th Duke of Manchester =

British peer and Member of Parliament

His Grace The Duke of Manchester
- Montagu

Member of Parliament for Huntingdonshire
- In office 1877–1880
- Monarch: Victoria

Personal details
- Born: 17 June 1853 Kimbolton, Huntingdonshire, England
- Died: 18 August 1892 (aged 39) Tandragee Castle, County Armagh, Ulster, Ireland
- Spouse: Consuelo Yznaga (m. 1876)
- Children: William Montagu, 9th Duke of Manchester; Lady Jacqueline Montagu; Lady Alice Montagu
- Parents: William Montagu, 7th Duke of Manchester; Countess Louise von Alten

George Victor Drogo "Kim" Montagu, 8th Duke of Manchester (17 June 1853 – 18 August 1892), styled Lord Kimbolton from 1853 to 1855 and Viscount Mandeville from 1855 to 1890, was a British peer and Member of Parliament.

== Background ==
Montagu was the eldest of the five children of William Drogo Montagu, 7th Duke of Manchester, and Countess Louise von Alten. He was educated at Eton.

== Political and military career ==
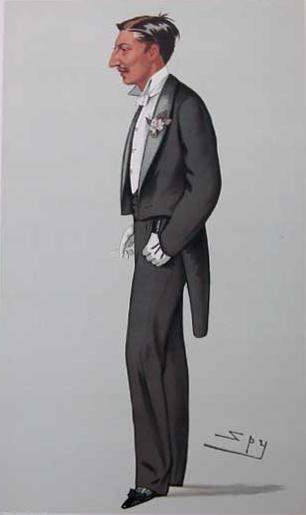
"Kim" — The then-Viscount Mandeville, as caricatured by 'Spy' (Leslie Ward) in Vanity Fair, April 1882

Aged 18 he became an officer in the part-time Militia, commissioned on 18 December 1871 as a Lieutenant in the Huntingdonshire Rifles, of which his father was second-in-command. By 1877 he was a captain and in 1880 he transferred to the Armagh Light Infantry militia (later the 3rd Battalion Royal Irish Fusiliers).

During the Anglo-Zulu War (1879) he was appointed aide de camp to Sir Garnet Wolseley and according to a report in the Newsletter on one occasion "he was assegaied by a Zulu running amok and shot him".

In 1877 Montagu was elected to the House of Commons for Huntingdonshire, a seat he held until 1880. He was Worshipful Master freemason of Union Lodge No. 105 in 1879.

In 1890 he succeeded his father in the dukedom and took his seat in the House of Lords. He was declared bankrupt the same year.

== Family ==
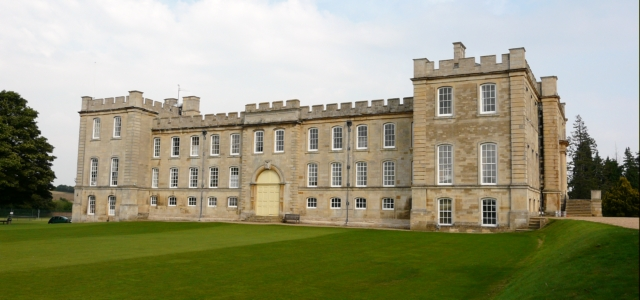
Kimbolton Castle, the former seat of the Dukes of Manchester

On 22 May 1876 at Grace Church, Manhattan, New York, New York County, New York, Mandeville married Consuelo Yznaga, the daughter of a wealthy Cuban plantation owner and a renowned beauty. Her older brother was New York banker Fernando Yznaga. It was widely accepted that he had married her for her $6 million dowry and she him for his titles. One of Consuelo Yznaga's closest friends, Edith Wharton, was said to have incorporated certain aspects of her friend's marriage in her unfinished novel, The Buccaneers. Their union produced a son and twin daughters:

- William Montagu, 9th Duke of Manchester (3 March 1877 – 9 February 1947)
- Lady Jaqueline Mary Alva Montagu (27 November 1879 – 15 March 1895)
- Lady Alice Eleanor Louise Montagu (27 November 1879 – 10 January 1900), who died of consumption.

== Personal life and death ==
Prior to his marriage, Mandeville had been considered an inebriate, and was shunned by respectable society. His circle of closest friends in Ireland included Edward Russell, 24th Baron de Clifford; Derrick Westenra, 5th Baron Rossmore and Francis Needham, 3rd Earl of Kilmorey.

By 1882 Mandeville had spent so much of his wife's dowry on gambling and mistresses, that his father the 7th Duke, banished the couple to Tandragee Castle. After one year, he was back with his mistress music-hall singer Bessie Bellwood, and the couple was living apart in London. Mandeville cut all his ties with Bellwood in 1890.

Manchester died on 18 August 1892 of cirrhosis of the liver aged only 39, and was succeeded in his titles by his son William. He was buried at Ballymore Parish Church, located close to Tandragee Castle.

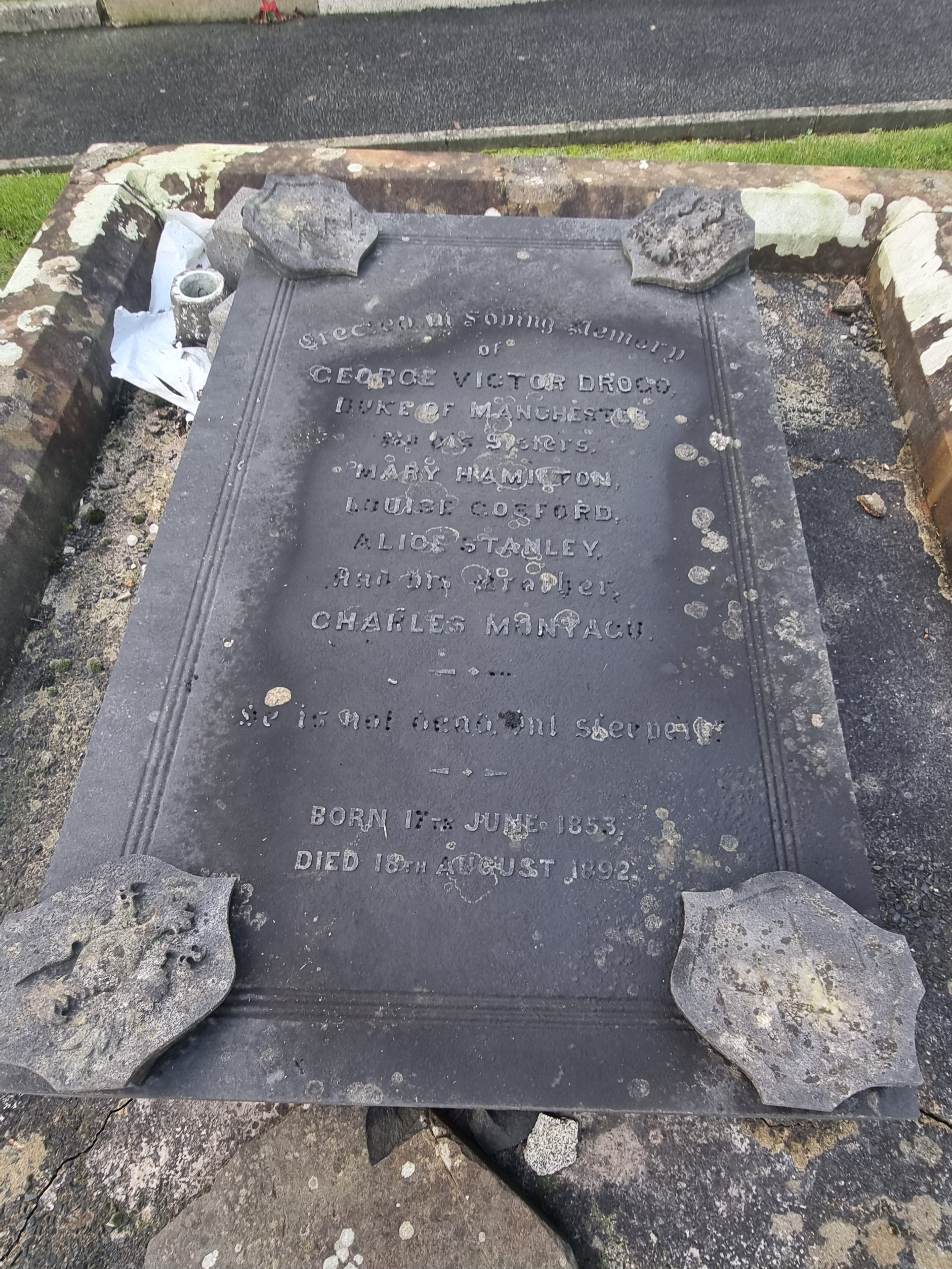
Grave of George Montagu at Ballymore Parish Church, Tandragee

== Notes ==
Parliament of the United Kingdom
Preceded by Edward Fellowes; Sir Henry Carstairs Pelly	Member of Parliament for Huntingdonshire; 1877–1880; With: Edward Fellowes	Succeeded by William Fellowes; Lord Douglas Gordon
Peerage of Great Britain
Preceded by William Drogo Montagu	Duke of Manchester; 1890–1892	Succeeded by William Angus Drogo Montagu
