= John Bonfoy Rooper =

British Member of Parliament

John Bonfoy Rooper (8 August 1778 – March 1855) was a British Member of Parliament.

== Life ==
He was born the eldest son of John Rooper of Berkhampstead Castle, Hertfordshire and Abbots Ripton Hall, Huntingdonshire, and was educated at Rugby School from 1790. He matriculated at St. John's College, Cambridge in 1797, graduating B.A. in 1801, and entered Lincoln's Inn in 1800. He succeeded his father in 1826.

In his youth Rooper travelled to America and became a staunch Liberal. While he was there the family lost possession of Berkhampstead Castle and retreated to Abbots Ripton. In 1831 he was elected MP for Huntingdonshire, sitting until he was defeated in 1837. He was appointed High Sheriff of Cambridgeshire and Huntingdonshire for 1845–1846.

Rooper died on 11 March 1855 from a domestic accident, falling over bannisters.

== Family ==
Rooper married Harriet, the daughter and heiress of William Pott of Portman Square, Middlesex, with whom he had 5 sons and 11 daughters. He was succeeded in turn by his sons:

- Bonfoy Rooper (1827–1869); and
- the Rev. Plummer Pott Rooper (1828–1881), rector of Abbots Ripton. He married Georgiana Thornhill, daughter of George Thornhill.

Other sons were Henry Godolphin and Frederic James.

Of the daughters:

- Harriet Emily, married in 1834 the Rev. George Cheere.
- Louisa, married in 1845 Thomas Leventhorpe. Rooper Leventhorpe (1850–1940) was their son.
- Selina Mary Anna, the fourth, married in 1846 William Hobson Moubray R.N. She died in 1855. His second wife, from 1857, was Adeline Hannah Babington.
- Philippa married in 1858 John Chester (later John St Leger) of Park Hill.
- Constance, married the Rev. Samuel King (c.1825–1899).
- Georgiana, the youngest, married William Stuart Knox.

Other daughters were Frances. and Caroline who married James Currie.

Rooper was great-uncle to Thomas Godolphin Rooper, writer on education: he was the son of the cleric William Henry Rooper, son of Thomas Richard Rooper (1782–1865), also a cleric, and as the third son of John Rooper the brother of John Bonfoy Rooper. In the next generation, William Victor Trevor Rooper was the son of Percy Lens Rooper, the son of Captain John Rooper (1809–1892) of the Rifle Brigade; who was another son of Thomas Richard Rooper.
