= Huntingdonshire (constituency) =

Parliamentary constituency in the United Kingdom, 1801-1885 & 1918–1983

- Former county constituency for the House of Commons

1918–1983
- Seats: One
- Created from: Huntingdon; Ramsey
- Replaced by: Huntingdon; SW Cambridgeshire; Peterborough

1290–1885
- Seats: 2 (1290 – 1654); 3 (1654 – 1659); 2 (1659 – 1885)
- Type of constituency: County constituency
- Replaced by: Huntingdon; Ramsey

Huntingdonshire was a parliamentary constituency covering the county of Huntingdonshire in England. It was represented by two members of Parliament in the House of Commons of England until 1707, then in the House of Commons of Great Britain from 1707 to 1800, and then in the House of Commons of the Parliament of the United Kingdom from 1801 to 1885. It was reconstituted as a single-member seat in 1918 and abolished once again in 1983.

== History ==
Huntingdonshire returned two Knights of the Shire from 1290 to 1885 (apart from 1654 to 1659, when it returned three); when elections were contested, the bloc vote system was used.

Under the Redistribution of Seats Act 1885, it was divided between the two single-seat county divisions of Huntingdon and Ramsey, with effect from the 1885 general election.

Under the Representation of the People Act 1918, Huntingdon and Ramsey were re-united and the constituency was reconstituted, returning a single Member of Parliament (MP). Subject to boundary changes for the 1983 general election, the constituency was succeeded by the re-established constituency of Huntingdon. Its MP at the time, John Major, continued to represent it.

== Boundaries and boundary changes ==
=== 1918–1974 ===
- The administrative county of Huntingdonshire.

=== 1974–1983 ===
In 1965 Huntingdonshire was merged into the new administrative county of Huntingdon and Peterborough and in the next redistribution of parliamentary seats, which took effect for the February 1974 general election, the constituency was defined as comprising:

- The Municipal Boroughs of Huntingdon and Godmanchester, and St Ives:
- The Urban Districts of Old Fletton, Ramsey, and St Neots; and
- The Rural Districts of Huntingdon, Norman Cross, St Ives, and St Neots.

Eaton Socon in Bedfordshire had been absorbed by the Urban District of St Neots and was transferred from the County Constituency of Mid Bedfordshire. There were other marginal adjustments due to changes in county borders.

As a result of the Local Government Act 1972, the two counties of Cambridgeshire and Isle of Ely, and Huntingdon and Peterborough were merged to form the non-metropolitan county of Cambridgeshire, with effect from 1 April 1974. However, the next redistribution did not come into effect until the 1983 general election, when the majority of the constituency, including Huntingdon, Godmanchester, Ramsey and St Ives, formed the bulk of the re-established onstituency of Huntingdon. Areas to the south of the River Nene, including Fletton and the Ortons, which were now part of the expanded City of Peterborough, were transferred to Peterborough, and southernmost areas, including St Neots, were transferred to the new constituency of South West Cambridgeshire.

== Members of Parliament ==
- Constituency created (1290)

=== 1290–1660 ===
Parliament	First member	Second member	Third Member (1654 & 1656 only)
1302	Sir John Swinford		
1305	Sir John Swinford		
1306	Sir John Swinford		
1318	Sir John Swinford		
1319	Sir John Swinford		
1377	John Herlyngton		
1384	John Herlyngton		
1385	Sir Nicholas Stukeley	Sir William Papworth	
1386	Sir William Moigne	Robert Lovetot	
1388 (Feb)	Robert Waryn	Richard Botiller	
1388 (Sep)	Robert Waryn	John Herlyngton	
1390 (Jan)	Sir William Moigne	Sir Henry Green	
1390 (Nov)	Sir William Moigne	Robert Waryn	
1391	Sir William Moigne	Robert Lovetot	
1393	Sir John Peckbridge	Sir Robert Stokes	
1394	John Herlyngton	John Waweton	
1395	John Herlyngton	John Waweton	
1397 (Jan)	John Stukeley	Sir Thomas Waweton	
1397 (Sep)	John Knyvet	Sir Thomas Waweton	
1399	John Herlyngton	Robert Beville	
1401	Robert Scott	Sir Thomas Waweton	
1402	Robert Scott	Sir Thomas Waweton	
1404 (Jan)	Robert Scott	Sir John Tiptoft	
1404 (Oct)	Robert Scott	Sir John Tiptoft	
1406	John Botiller	Sir John Tiptoft	
1407	Roger Hunt	John Burton	
1410			
1411	Nicholas Stukeley	Robert Scott	
1413 (Feb)			
1413 (May)	Roger Hunt	Thomas Beville	
1414 (Apr)	Roger Hunt	John Botiller	
1414 (Nov)	Nicholas Stukeley	Sir Thomas Waweton	
1415	Nicholas Stukeley	Thomas Beville	
1416 (Mar)	Nicholas Stukeley	Henry Waryn	
1416 (Oct)	Sir Nicholas Stukeley	John Hore	
1417	Roger Hunt	Thomas Beville	
1419	Roger Hunt	Robert Scott	
1420	Sir Nicholas Stukeley	Sir Thomas Waweton	
1421 (May)	Sir Nicholas Stukeley	Roger Hunt	
1421 (Dec)	Robert Stonham	Henry Hethe	
1422	Sir Thomas Waweton		
1422	Roger Hunt		
1423	Roger Hunt		
1425	Roger Hunt	Robert Scott	
1426	Roger Hunt		
1427	Roger Hunt		
1429	Roger Hunt	?Robert Stonham	
1431	Roger Hunt		
1432	Roger Hunt	Robert Stonham	
1433	Roger Hunt	Robert Stonham	
1439	Robert Stonham		
1442	Robert Stonham		
1445	Robert Stonham		
1447	Robert Stonham		
1449	Thomas Tresham		
1449 (Nov)	Robert Stonham		
1450	Robert Stonham		
1453	Robert Stonham		
1472	John Sapcote		
1510	John Wynde	John Taylard	
1512			
1515			
1523			
1529	Nicholas Harvey	Lawrence Taylard	
1536			
1539	Richard Cromwell alias Williams	Oliver Leder	
1542	(Sir) Richard Cromwell alias Williams	Robert ap Rice	
1545			
1547	Sir John Baker	Robert ap Rice	
1553 (Mar)	?	Thomas Audley	
1553 (Oct)	(Sir) Lawrence Taylard	Oliver Leder	
1554 (Apr)	Sir Robert Tyrwhitt	Thomas Cotton	
1554 (Nov)	William Lawrence	Henry Mannock	
1555	Thomas Maria Wingfield	William Mallory	
1558	Thomas Cotton	William Lawrence	
1559 (Jan)	Sir Robert Tyrwhitt	Simon Throckmorton	
1562–1563	Henry Cromwell alias Williams	Richard Dorrington	
1571	Sir Henry Darcy	Richard Dorrington	
1572 (Apr)	Richard Dorrington, died and replaced 1576 by Sir Henry Darcy	Francis Cromwell alias Williams	
1584 (Nov)	Sir Robert Bevill	John Dorrington	
1586	Edward Wingfield	George Walton	
1588 (Oct)	Edward Wingfield	Oliver Cromwell	
1593	Edward Wingfield	Oliver Cromwell	
1597 (Oct)	Sir Gervase Clifton	Oliver Cromwell	
1601 (Oct)	Sir Gervase Clifton	Oliver Cromwell	
1604	Sir Robert Cotton, 1st Baronet, of Connington	Sir Oliver Cromwell	
1614	Sir Robert Payne	Sir Oliver Cromwell	
1621–1622	Robert Bevill	Sir Robert Payne	
1624	Edward Montagu	Sir Oliver Cromwell	
1625	Edward Montagu	Sir Oliver Cromwell	
1626	Edward Montagu	Sir Robert Payne	
1628	Sir Robert Payne	Sir Capel Bedel	
1629–1640	No Parliaments convened		
Apr 1640	Thomas Cotton	Sir Capel Bedel	
Nov 1640	Sir Sidney Montagu, disabled 1642 replaced by Edward Montagu October 1645	Valentine Walton	
1653	Edward Montagu	Stephen Pheasant	
1654	Edward Montagu	Henry Cromwell	Stephen Pheasant
1656	Edward Montagu	Henry Cromwell	Nicholas Pedley
1659	Henry Cromwell	Nicholas Pedley	
1659	Edward Montagu	Valentine Walton	

=== 1660–1885 ===
Year	First member	First party	Second member	Second party		
1660	Viscount Mandeville		Henry Cromwell			
February 1673	Sir Nicholas Pedley		Henry Cromwell			
November 1673	Sir Nicholas Pedley		Robert Apreece			
February 1679	Hon. Ralph Montagu		Robert Apreece			
August 1679	Sir Thomas Proby, Bt		Silius Titus			
1685	Sir John Cotton, Bt		Sir Lionel Walden			
1689	Robert Montagu		Sir Robert Bernard, Bt			
1690	Robert Montagu		John Dryden			
1693	John Proby		John Dryden			
1695	Heneage Montagu		Anthony Hammond			
June 1698	Robert Apreece		Anthony Hammond			
July 1698	John Proby		Robert Throckmorton			
1699	John Proby		John Dryden			
1702	William Naylor		John Dryden			
1705	John Pocklington		John Dryden			
1708	John Pocklington		John Proby			
1710	John Pocklington		Sir John Cotton, Bt			
1713	Sir Matthew Dudley, Bt	Whig	Robert Pigott	Whig		
1715	John Bigg		Robert Pigott	Whig		
April 1722	John Bigg		Viscount Hinchingbrooke			
October 1722	John Bigg		John Proby			
1727	John Bigg		Marquess of Hartington	Whig		
1730	John Bigg		Robert Pigott	Whig		
1734	Lord Robert Montagu		Robert Pigott	Whig		
1739	Charles Clarke		Robert Pigott	Whig		
1741	William Mitchell		Coulson Fellowes			
1745	William Montagu		Coulson Fellowes			
1747	Edward Wortley-Montagu		Coulson Fellowes			
1754	The Lord Carysfort		Coulson Fellowes			
1761	The Lord Carysfort		Viscount Mandeville			
1762	The Lord Carysfort		Lord Charles Montagu			
1765	The Lord Carysfort		Robert Bernard			
1768	Viscount Hinchingbrooke	Tory	The Earl Ludlow			
1792	Lancelot Brown		The Earl Ludlow			
1794	Viscount Hinchingbrooke		The Earl Ludlow			
1796	Viscount Hinchingbrooke		Lord Frederick Montagu			
1806	Viscount Hinchingbrooke		Lord Proby			
1807	Viscount Hinchingbrooke		William Henry Fellowes	Tory		
1814	Lord Proby		William Henry Fellowes	Tory		
1818	Lord Frederick Montagu	Tory	William Henry Fellowes	Tory		
1820	Lord John Russell	Whig	William Henry Fellowes	Tory		
1826	Viscount Mandeville	Tory	William Henry Fellowes	Tory		
1830	Viscount Mandeville	Tory	Lord Strathavon	Tory		
1831	Viscount Mandeville	Tory	John Bonfoy Rooper	Whig		
1834	Viscount Mandeville	Conservative	John Bonfoy Rooper	Whig		
1837	Edward Fellowes	Conservative	George Thornhill	Conservative		
1852	Edward Fellowes	Conservative	Viscount Mandeville	Conservative		
1855	Edward Fellowes	Conservative	James Rust	Conservative		
1857 (Note: Both Heathcote and Fellowes secured the same number of votes and were returned alongside Rust in a treble election. However, after scrutiny, Heathcote was declared unduly elected in July 1857)	Edward Fellowes	Conservative	James Rust	Conservative	John Heathcoate	Whig
1859	Edward Fellowes	Conservative	Lord Robert Montagu	Conservative		
1874	Edward Fellowes	Conservative	Sir Henry Pelly, 3rd Baronet	Conservative		
1877	Edward Fellowes	Conservative	Viscount Mandeville	Conservative		
1880	William Fellowes	Conservative	Lord Douglas Gordon	Liberal		
1885	constituency abolished, Huntingdon and Ramsey from 1885					

=== 1918–1983 ===
Year	Member	Party
Huntingdon and Ramsey prior to 1918
1918	Oliver Locker-Lampson	Conservative
1922	Charles Murchison	Conservative
1923	Leonard Costello	Liberal
1924	Sir Charles Murchison	Conservative
1929	Sidney Peters	Liberal
1931	Sidney Peters	National Liberal
1945	David Renton	Liberal National
1950	David Renton	National Liberal and Conservative
1964	David Renton	Conservative and National Liberal
1970	David Renton	Conservative
1979	John Major	Conservative
1983	constituency abolished, Huntingdon and parts of Peterborough and SW Cambs from 1983	

== Elections ==
=== Elections in the 1830s ===
General election 1830: Huntingdonshire (2 seats)
Party	Candidate	Votes	%	±%
Tory	George Montagu	1,068	37.3	
Tory	Charles Gordon	990	34.6	
Whig	John Bonfoy Rooper	804	28.1	
Majority		186	6.5	
Turnout		c. 1,431	c. 75.3	
Registered electors		c. 1,900		
Tory hold		Swing		
Tory hold		Swing		

General election 1831: Huntingdonshire (2 seats)
Party	Candidate	Votes	%	±%
Whig	John Bonfoy Rooper	841	37.8	+9.7
Tory	George Montagu	812	36.5	−0.8
Whig	Charles Gordon	573	25.7	−8.9
Turnout		c. 1,113	c. 58.6	c. −16.7
Registered electors		c. 1,900		
Majority		29	1.3	N/A
Whig gain from Tory		Swing	+5.1	
Majority		239	10.8	+4.3
Tory hold		Swing	−0.8	

General election 1832: Huntingdonshire (2 seats)
Party	Candidate	Votes	%
Whig	John Bonfoy Rooper	Unopposed	
Tory	George Montagu	Unopposed	
Registered electors		2,647	
Whig hold			
Tory hold			

General election 1835: Huntingdonshire (2 seats)
Party	Candidate	Votes	%
Whig	John Bonfoy Rooper	Unopposed	
Conservative	George Montagu	Unopposed	
Registered electors		2,653	
Whig hold			
Conservative hold			

General election 1837: Huntingdonshire (2 seats)
Party	Candidate	Votes	%
Conservative	Edward Fellowes	1,392	37.5
Conservative	George Thornhill	1,332	35.9
Whig	John Bonfoy Rooper	990	26.7
Majority		342	9.2
Turnout		2,284	81.4
Registered electors		2,805	
Conservative hold			
Conservative gain from Whig			

=== Elections in the 1840s ===
General election 1841: Huntingdonshire (2 seats)
Party	Candidate	Votes	%	±%
Conservative	Edward Fellowes	Unopposed		
Conservative	George Thornhill	Unopposed		
Registered electors		3,054		
Conservative hold				
Conservative hold				

General election 1847: Huntingdonshire (2 seats)
Party	Candidate	Votes	%	±%
Conservative	Edward Fellowes	Unopposed		
Conservative	George Thornhill	Unopposed		
Registered electors		3,074		
Conservative hold				
Conservative hold				

=== Elections in the 1850s ===
Thornhill's death caused a by-election.

By-election, 11 June 1852: Huntingdonshire
Party	Candidate	Votes	%	±%
Conservative	William Montagu	Unopposed		
Conservative hold				

General election 1852: Huntingdonshire (2 seats)
Party	Candidate	Votes	%	±%
Conservative	Edward Fellowes	Unopposed		
Conservative	William Montagu	Unopposed		
Registered electors		2,852		
Conservative hold				
Conservative hold				

Montagu succeeded to the peerage, becoming 7th Duke of Manchester and causing a by-election.

By-election, 23 October 1855: Huntingdonshire
Party	Candidate	Votes	%	±%
Conservative	James Rust	Unopposed		
Conservative hold				

General election 1857: Huntingdonshire (2 seats)
Party	Candidate	Votes	%	±%
Conservative	James Rust	1,192	35.0	N/A
Conservative	Edward Fellowes	1,106	32.5	N/A
Whig	John Heathcote	1,106	32.5	New
Majority		0	±0.0	N/A
Turnout		2,255 (est)	77.3 (est)	N/A
Registered electors		2,918		
Conservative hold		Swing	N/A	
Conservative hold		Swing	N/A	
Whig win				

Securing the same number of votes, both Fellowes and Heathcote were returned alongside Rust as Members of Parliament. However, after scrutiny, Rust and Fellowes lost one vote, while Heathcote lost two, causing Heathcote to be declared unduly elected on 31 July 1857.

General election 1859: Huntingdonshire (2 seats)
Party	Candidate	Votes	%	±%
Conservative	Edward Fellowes	1,404	37.1	+4.6
Conservative	Robert Montagu	1,314	34.7	−0.3
Liberal	John Heathcote	1,068	28.2	−4.3
Majority		246	6.5	+6.5
Turnout		2,427 (est)	80.3 (est)	+3.0
Registered electors		3,024		
Conservative hold		Swing	+3.4	
Conservative hold		Swing	+0.9	

=== Elections in the 1860s ===
General election 1865: Huntingdonshire (2 seats)
Party	Candidate	Votes	%	±%
Conservative	Edward Fellowes	Unopposed		
Conservative	Robert Montagu	Unopposed		
Registered electors		2,999		
Conservative hold				
Conservative hold				

Montagu's appointment as Vice-President of the Committee of the Council on Education required a by-election.

1867 Huntingdonshire by-election
Party	Candidate	Votes	%	±%
Conservative	Robert Montagu	Unopposed		
Conservative hold				

General election 1868: Huntingdonshire (2 seats)
Party	Candidate	Votes	%	±%
Conservative	Edward Fellowes	Unopposed		
Conservative	Robert Montagu	Unopposed		
Registered electors		3,748		
Conservative hold				
Conservative hold				

=== Elections in the 1870s ===
General election 1874: Huntingdonshire (2 seats)
Party	Candidate	Votes	%	±%
Conservative	Edward Fellowes	1,648	38.1	N/A
Conservative	Henry Pelly	1,482	34.3	N/A
Liberal	Douglas Gordon	1,192	27.6	New
Majority		290	6.7	N/A
Turnout		2,757 (est)	76.8 (est)	N/A
Registered electors		3,592		
Conservative hold		Swing	N/A	
Conservative hold		Swing	N/A	

Pelly's death caused a by-election.

1877 Huntingdonshire by-election (1 seat)
Party	Candidate	Votes	%	±%
Conservative	George Montagu	1,468	51.0	−21.4
Liberal	Henry Wentworth-FitzWilliam	1,410	49.0	+21.4
Majority		58	2.0	−4.7
Turnout		2,878	76.8	±0.0
Registered electors		3,748		
Conservative hold		Swing	−21.4	

=== Elections in the 1880s ===
General election 1880: Huntingdonshire (2 seats)
Party	Candidate	Votes	%	±%
Conservative	William Fellowes	1,786	35.7	−2.4
Liberal	Douglas Gordon	1,617	32.3	+4.7
Conservative	George Montagu	1,596	31.9	−2.4
Turnout		3,403 (est)	86.0 (est)	+9.2
Registered electors		3,955		
Majority		169	3.4	−3.3
Conservative hold		Swing	−2.4	
Majority		21	0.4	N/A
Liberal gain from Conservative		Swing	−2.4	

=== Elections in the 1910s ===
General election 1918: Huntingdonshire
Party		Candidate	Votes	%	±%
C	Unionist	Oliver Locker-Lampson	10,760	62.6	
	Liberal	Robert Christopher Grey	6,416	37.4	
Majority			4,344	25.2	
Turnout			17,176	62.8	
	Unionist win (new seat)				
C indicates candidate endorsed by the coalition government.

=== Elections in the 1920s ===
Lina Scott Gatty

General election 1922: Huntingdonshire
Party	Candidate	Votes	%	±%
Unionist	Charles Murchison	10,079	50.7	−11.9
Liberal	Lina Scott Gatty	5,123	25.7	−11.7
Labour	Dermot Freyer	4,697	23.6	New
Majority		4,956	25.0	−0.2
Turnout		19,899	70.7	+7.9
Unionist hold		Swing	−0.1	

Leonard Costello

General election 1923: Huntingdonshire
Party	Candidate	Votes	%	±%
Liberal	Leonard Costello	10,465	52.7	+27.0
Unionist	Charles Murchison	9,404	47.3	−3.4
Majority		1,061	5.4	N/A
Turnout		19,869	69.6	−1.1
Liberal gain from Unionist		Swing	+15.2	

General election 1924: Huntingdonshire
Party	Candidate	Votes	%	±%
Unionist	Charles Murchison	12,827	56.9	+9.6
Liberal	Leonard Costello	9,703	43.1	−9.6
Majority		3,124	13.8	N/A
Turnout		22,530	77.8	+8.2
Unionist gain from Liberal		Swing	+9.6	

General election 1929: Huntingdonshire
Party	Candidate	Votes	%	±%
Liberal	Sidney Peters	12,889	45.6	+2.5
Unionist	Charles Murchison	11,935	42.1	−14.8
Labour	C S Giddins	3,493	12.3	New
Majority		954	3.5	N/A
Turnout		28,317	77.2	−0.6
Liberal gain from Unionist		Swing	+8.7	

=== Elections in the 1930s ===
General election 1931: Huntingdonshire
Party	Candidate	Votes	%	±%
National Liberal	Sidney Peters	23,102	83.3	+37.7
Labour	Maurice Orbach	4,624	16.7	+4.4
Majority		18,478	66.6	+63.1
Turnout		27,726	74.2	−3.0
National Liberal hold		Swing	+16.7	

General election 1935: Huntingdonshire
Party	Candidate	Votes	%	±%
National Liberal	Sidney Peters	17,287	68.7	−14.6
Labour	James Lievsley George	7,861	31.3	+14.6
Majority		9,426	37.4	−29.2
Turnout		25,148	66.2	−8.0
National Liberal hold		Swing	−14.6	

General Election 1939–40

Another General Election was required to take place before the end of 1940. The political parties had been making preparations for an election to take place and by the Autumn of 1939, the following candidates had been selected;

- Liberal National: Sidney Peters
- Labour: James Lunnon

=== Elections in the 1940s ===
General election 1945: Huntingdonshire
Party	Candidate	Votes	%	±%
National Liberal	David Renton	15,389	50.1	−18.6
Labour	W A Waters	9,458	30.8	−0.5
Liberal	Henry Walston	5,869	19.1	N/A
Majority		5,931	19.3	−18.1
Turnout		30,716	65.7	−0.5
National Liberal hold		Swing	−9.1	

=== Elections in the 1950s ===
General election 1950: Huntingdonshire
Party	Candidate	Votes	%	±%
National Liberal	David Renton	18,551	51.4	+1.3
Labour	Francis Robert Macdonald	13,096	36.3	+5.5
Liberal	William George F Thompson	4,442	12.3	−6.8
Majority		5,455	15.1	−4.2
Turnout		36,089	82.6	+16.9
National Liberal hold		Swing	−2.1	

General election 1951: Huntingdonshire
Party	Candidate	Votes	%	±%
National Liberal	David Renton	20,845	57.4	+6.0
Labour	Francis Robert Macdonald	15,487	42.6	+6.3
Majority		5,358	14.8	−0.3
Turnout		36,332	80.8	−1.8
National Liberal hold		Swing	−0.2	

General election 1955: Huntingdonshire
Party	Candidate	Votes	%	±%
National Liberal	David Renton	20,609	58.4	+1.0
Labour	John Albert Franks	14,670	41.6	−1.0
Majority		5,939	16.8	+2.0
Turnout		35,279	77.1	−3.7
National Liberal hold		Swing	+1.0	

General election 1959: Huntingdonshire
Party	Candidate	Votes	%	±%
National Liberal	David Renton	20,254	53.9	−4.5
Labour	John Wilson Fear	11,983	31.8	−9.8
Liberal	Richard Edward Walter Vanderplank	5,389	14.3	N/A
Majority		8,271	22.1	+5.3
Turnout		37,626	80.4	+3.3
National Liberal hold		Swing	+2.7	

=== Elections in the 1960s ===
General election 1964: Huntingdonshire
Party	Candidate	Votes	%	±%
National Liberal	David Renton	20,320	51.1	−2.8
Labour	Leslie J Potter	12,456	31.3	−0.5
Liberal	Peter G H Thorold	6,992	17.6	+3.3
Majority		7,864	19.8	−2.3
Turnout		39,768	78.8	−1.6
National Liberal hold		Swing	−1.2	

General election 1966: Huntingdonshire
Party	Candidate	Votes	%	±%
National Liberal	David Renton	20,504	49.1	−2.0
Labour	Martin Lawn	15,276	36.7	+5.4
Liberal	David Ralph Antony Spreckley	5,900	14.2	−3.4
Majority		5,228	12.4	−7.4
Turnout		41,680	77.6	−1.2
National Liberal hold		Swing	−3.7	

=== Elections in the 1970s ===
General election 1970: Huntingdonshire
Party	Candidate	Votes	%	±%
Conservative	David Renton	27,398	54.7	+5.6
Labour	James P P Curran	17,588	35.1	−1.6
Liberal	Michael Wilfrid B O'Loughlin	5,082	10.2	−4.0
Majority		9,810	19.6	+7.2
Turnout		50,068	75.3	−2.3
Conservative hold		Swing	+3.6	

General election February 1974: Huntingdonshire
Party	Candidate	Votes	%	±%
Conservative	David Renton	29,042	44.6	−10.1
Liberal	Dennis Graham Rowe	19,040	29.2	+19.0
Labour	Paul Andrew Ormerod	17,066	26.2	−8.9
Majority		10,002	15.4	−4.2
Turnout		65,148	82.4	+7.1
Conservative hold		Swing	−14.6	

General election October 1974: Huntingdonshire
Party	Candidate	Votes	%	±%
Conservative	David Renton	26,989	45.1	+0.5
Labour	Alan G Dowson	17,745	29.6	+3.4
Liberal	Dennis Graham Rowe	15,152	25.3	−3.9
Majority		9,244	15.5	+0.1
Turnout		59,886	75.1	−7.3
Conservative hold		Swing	−2.9	

General election 1979: Huntingdonshire
Party	Candidate	Votes	%	±%
Conservative	John Major	40,193	55.3	+10.2
Labour	Julian G H Fulbrook	18,630	25.7	−3.9
Liberal	Dennis Graham Rowe	12,812	17.6	−7.7
National Front	K T Robinson	983	1.4	New
Majority		21,563	29.6	+14.1
Turnout		72,618	77.4	+2.3
Conservative hold		Swing	+7.1	

== See also ==
- Parliamentary representation from Huntingdonshire
- List of former United Kingdom Parliament constituencies
- Unreformed House of Commons

== Notes and references ==
Notes

== Sources ==
- Leigh Rayment's Historical List of MPs – Constituencies beginning with "H" (part 4)
