= George Thornhill (MP) =

English Conservative member of parliament

George Thornhill (12 June 1783 – 19 May 1852) was an English Conservative member of parliament.

Thornhill was the eldest son of another George Thornhill, of Diddington Hall, Huntingdonshire. He was educated at Eton and St John's College, Cambridge. He studied law and was admitted to the Inner Temple in 1805. He was High Sheriff of Cambridgeshire and Huntingdonshire in 1836. He was elected to Parliament for the Huntingdonshire constituency in the 1837 general election and held the seat until his death. He had three sons who played first-class cricket: Charles, George junior and John.
