= Henry Yelverton (attorney general) =

Sixteenth-century English member of Parliament

Sir Henry Yelverton (29 June 1566 – 24 January 1630) was an English lawyer, politician, and judge.

== Early life ==
The eldest son of Sir Christopher Yelverton and his wife Margaret Catesby, Henry Yelverton was born on 29 June 1566, most likely at Easton-Mauduit, his father's house in Northamptonshire. He became a barrister on 25 April 1593 and an ancient on 25 May of the same year. He was reader in 1607.

== Career ==
In 1597, 1604 and 1614 Yelverton was elected to Parliament for the borough of Northampton. On 30 March 1604, when Sir Francis Goodwin's case was before the house, he argued for allowing Goodwin to take his seat, in the teeth of the support given by King James I to his rejection by Chancery. On 5 April, when James had issued his orders, Yelverton was frightened, and argued that the prince's command was like a thunderbolt or the roaring of a lion.

In the session of 1606–07, Yelverton was again in trouble, attacking George Home, 1st Earl of Dunbar, the king's Scottish favourite, and generally criticising the bills brought in for effecting a partial union with Scotland, while he fell under Francis Bacon's suspicion as having had a hand in a book published by the puritan lawyer Nicholas Fuller. On the other hand, Yelverton did not argue against the king's wishes in Calvin's Case and made efforts to regain the king's favour. A Mr Dummond, perhaps the courtier John Drummond of Hawthornden, advised him to enlist the help Arbella Stuart to gain the support of the Scottish Chancellor, Alexander Seton, 1st Earl of Dunfermline. Dunfermline presented Yelverton's petition to King James during his progress at Hinchingbrooke. Before the session of 1610, Yelverton sought an interview with the Earl of Dunbar, and ultimately was admitted by the king to an audience, in which he explained away the words that had given offence.

On 23 June, 1610, Yelverton asserted that the laws of England extended only to the low-water mark, and the king might therefore restrain all goods at sea from approaching the shore, and therefore only allow their being landed on payment of a duty.

In 1613, Bacon spoke of Yelverton as having been won to the side of the Crown, and on 28 October of the same year he succeeded Bacon as solicitor-general. He was knighted on 8 November, perhaps through the good word of the king's favourite, Rochester, shortly afterwards Robert Carr, 1st Earl of Somerset. Yelverton offered £500 towards the cost of The Masque of Flowers produced to celebrate Somerset's marriage to Frances Howard, but Bacon insisted on paying the whole charge.

In 1614, Yelverton again took his seat as member for Northampton in the Addled parliament. On 19 January 1615 he took an official part in the examination of Edmond Peacham under torture. About the same time he joined in signing a certificate in favour of the Chancery in the conflict with Sir Edward Coke on the question of praemunire.

On Bacon's acceptance of the great seal, in 1617, James announced that Yelverton should succeed him as attorney general. For some time, however, George Villiers, 1st Duke of Buckingham, obstructed him as a creature of the Howard family. Yelverton refused to apply to Buckingham, who sent for him; Yelverton expressed a hope that Buckingham would have no reason to complain of him, and had the warrant duly signed.

In the dispute between Coke and Buckingham about the marriage of Coke's daughter, Yelverton acted the part of mediator, and it was to his charge that Frances Coke was committed. Later on, he gave confidential information to Bacon on the feeling of Buckingham towards him, and pleaded the lord-keeper's cause at court with success.

Yelverton lost his position as attorney-general by his handling of an attack on monopolies. In April 1617, he was employed, at Buckingham's insistence, in taking legal proceedings against the opponents of the patent for gold and silver thread; but he refused to take the step of committing those persons to prison without first consulting the king.

In 1618, however, Yelverton concurred with Bacon and Montague in advising that the infringers of the patent should be prosecuted in the Star Chamber. Becoming himself one of the commissioners on 22 April 1618, he was subsequently placed on another commission issued on 20 October authorising means to be taken for the punishment of offenders, and in 1619, after the silkmen had refused to give a bond to abstain from the manufacture, he committed some of them to the Fleet prison; but being unwilling to bear the responsibility, announced his intention of releasing them unless Bacon would support him.

On 16 June, 1620, Bacon and others recommended that, in spite of Yelverton's acknowledgment of error, he should be tried in the Star-chamber on the ground of having officially passed a charter to the city of London containing unauthorised provisions, and on 27 June he was suspended from his office.

On 27 October, Yelverton more expressly acknowledged his offence in the Star-chamber; but this was again held insufficient, and on 10 November he was sentenced to imprisonment in the Tower of London during pleasure, fined, and dismissed from his place if the king approved. The king appointed Yelverton's successor in the attorney-generalship on 11 January, 1621.

If Yelverton gave offence to the court by his hesitation in defending the monopolies, he also gave offence to those who attacked the monopolies by defending them at all. On 18 April 1621, he was fetched from the Tower to answer charges brought against him in the House of Lords, where he stated in the course of his defence that his sufferings were, in his opinion, due to circumstances connected with the patent for inns.

At this James took offence, and on the 24th invited the peers to defend him against Yelverton's insinuations. On the 30th Yelverton, being called for his defence, turned fiercely upon Buckingham, charging him with using his influence with the king against him.

== Later life ==
On 16 May, the lords sentenced Yelverton to imprisonment, to make his submission to the king and Buckingham, and to pay to Buckingham five thousand marks, as well as ten thousand to the king. Buckingham at once refused to accept the money, while James was content with this vindication of himself and his favourite. Yelverton was accordingly set at liberty in July.

On 10 May 1625, soon after Charles I's accession, he was promoted to the bench as a fifth judge of the court of common pleas. In this post he remained till his death on 24 January, 1630. He was buried at Easton-Mauduit.

== Personal life ==
Yelverton married Mary, daughter of Robert Beale. His son and heir, Christopher, was knighted in 1623, was created a baronet in 1641, and died on 4 December 1654.
