= Christopher Yelverton =

English judge and politician (1536–1612)

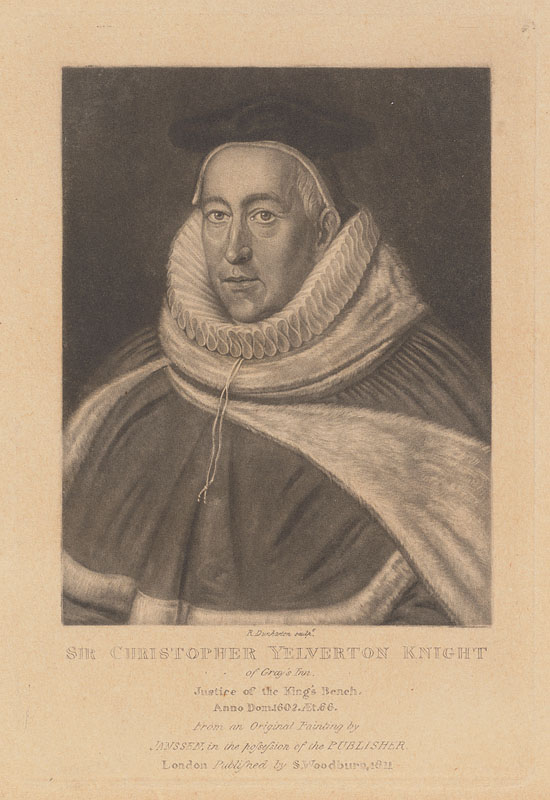
Sir Christopher Yelverton.

Sir Christopher Yelverton (1536 – 31 October 1612) was an English judge and Speaker of the House of Commons.

== Ancestry ==
Christopher Yelverton came from an ancient Norfolk family, tracing their descent back to Andrew Yelverton, who held considerable estates there in the reign of Edward II. His great-great-grandfather William Yelverton I married, first, Anne, a daughter of John Paston I (1421-1466) and Margaret Mautby, of Paston Hall, Norfolk.

The William Yelvertons II, III and IV (Christopher's father) seem to be descended from William Yelverton I's second marriage, to Eleanor Brewse of Rougham.

Christopher's father, William Yelverton IV of Rougham, Norfolk, married Anne, daughter and heiress of Sir Henry Fermor of East Barsham in Norfolk, "by whom he acquired large landed possessions."

== Early life ==
He was the third son of William Yelverton of Rougham, Norfolk. He matriculated at Queens' College, Cambridge, in 1550.

== Parliamentary career: Member of Parliament and Speaker ==
Yelverton was returned as knight of the shire for Northamptonshire in 1593. He was subsequently returned as MP for Brackley, Northamptonshire, in 1563, for Northampton in 1571, 1572 and 1597 - in which year his son Henry was also returned for the same constituency.

On 24 October 1597, Christopher Yelverton was elected Speaker of the House of Commons during the reign of Elizabeth I at a Parliament summoned to deal with "the exhaustion of the Queen's exchequer". Following precedent in modestly requesting to be excused, Yelverton went to extraordinary lengths to cite his unfitness for the role:

Neither from my person nor my nature doth this choice arise: for he that supplieth this place ought to be a man big and comely, stately and well-spoken; his voice great, his courage majestic, his nature haughty and his purse plentiful and heavy; but, contrarily, the stature of my person is small, myself not so well-spoken, my voice low, my carriage lawyer-like and of common-fashion, my nature soft and bashful, and my purse thin, light, and never yet plentiful.

Notwithstanding his diffidence, Yelverton was a conspicuously successful Speaker. He exercised moderation and discretion to defuse tensions between Parliament and the Crown. His Puritan tendencies were well known. He was an eloquent orator, though his contributions to debates show him to have been as much concerned with careful legal drafting as with rhetorical showmanship, and his conduct as Speaker was marked by a lawyerly concern to establish proper procedures for the conduct of the business.

== Legal career ==
He was recorder of Northampton from 1568 to 1599, JP for Northamptonshire from about 1573, and called to the bar and elected treasurer of Gray's Inn in 1579 and 1585. He was Reader in 1574 and 1584, when his subject was the statute of 1540 relating to execution for debt. He was created serjeant-at-law in 1589, served as Queen's Serjeant from 1598 to 1602, and was a Justice of the Court of King's Bench from 1602 to 1612.

Yelverton was an excellent technical lawyer and was regarded as a good judge, one of the few to escape criticism by Sir Robert Cecil, principal secretary, in his memorandum on the state of the judicial bench in 1603. As Queen's Serjeant he led the prosecution in Westminster Hall on 19 February 1601 of those involved in Essex's rebellion. He was also one of the judges ruling on the Postnati case in 1608. In addition, he had a broader interest in legal culture, passing on to his son a collection of legal manuscripts; and, like many other lawyers of his generation, he made his own reports of cases. These reports remained unpublished and the well-known Yelverton report is by his son Henry Yelverton.

For all his finesse as Speaker Yelverton was a man of considerable toughness. He was appointed second justice at Lancaster in 1598. As justice of the assize on the northern circuit and JP of many northern counties from 1599, he was in the forefront of the common lawyers' attack on the Council of the North. Friction developed in 1600, when he snubbed Ralph Eure, 3rd Lord Eure, vice-president, who was sitting with Sir John Savile as justice of jail delivery. Matters came to a head in 1601 when he required the lord president, Sir Thomas Cecil, 2nd Lord Burghley, to leave the court. Legal opinion was at first behind Yelverton, but in June 1602 he was summoned to the Star Chamber and publicly reprimanded for his conduct. There were more complaints about him but he weathered the criticism. Elizabeth I did not bestow a knighthood on him and it was left to James VI and I to do so. The king was more generous still, making him KB on 23 July 1603.

=== Yelverton's tribute to the rule of law ===
To illustrate the sixteenth-century reverence for the rule of law, Christopher Brooks quotes part of Yelverton's speech made in 1589 at Gray’s Inn, marking his promotion to serjeant-at-law:

I cannot sufficiently, nor amply enough magnifie the majestie and dignitie of the lawe, for it is the devine gifte and invention of god, and the profound determination of wise men, the most strong synewe of a common wealth and the soule w[i]thout w[hi]ch the magistrate cannot stand. . . . The necessitie of lawe is such that as in some nacons, where all learning is forbidden, yet the houses of law be suffred, that thereby the people may the sooner be induced to civilitie and the better provoked to the performance of there [sic] duty . . . to live w[i]thout governm[en]t is hellish and to governe without Lawe is brutish . . . the Law (saith Tully) containeth all wisdome, and all the rules of philosophie, and let them all (saith he) say what they will, if man would search the originall and very groundes of the Lawes, they seeme for weight of authoritie, strength of reason, and plenty of profit to excell all the philosophers' Libraries.

== Entertainment ==
Christopher Yelverton, as early as 1566, had written the epilogue to George Gascoigne's Jocasta, and in 1587 it appears that eight persons, Members of the Society of Gray's Inn, were engaged in the production of The Misfortunes of Arthur for the entertainment of Queen Elizabeth I, at Greenwich, on 8 February 1587: viz. Thomas Hughes, the author of the whole body of the tragedy; William Fulbecke, who wrote two speeches substitute on the representation and appended to the old printed copy; Nicholas Trotte, who furnished the introduction; Francis Flower, who penned choruses for the first and second acts; Christopher Yelverton, Francis Bacon and John Lancaster who devised the "dumb shows," mimed representations which at that time usually accompanied such performances.

"Notwithstanding his puritanism in religion, several contemporary diarists record his ribald anecdotes and conversation, and John Manningham hints that he was not averse to enjoying himself in the company of gentlewomen when he was well into his seventies."

== Private life ==
Yelverton, despite his complaints about poverty and the expense of providing for such a large family, was very active in the purchase of land in his adopted county of Northamptonshire, spending in excess of £5000 on properties in his lifetime, most of which descended on his death to his heir, Henry Yelverton. He died on 31 October 1612 'of very age' at seventy-five in his 70-room mansion at Easton Maudit and was buried on 3 November in the church at Easton Maudit, where a monument with his recumbent effigy in robes survives. He had married Margaret Catesby, the daughter of Thomas Catesby of Whiston, Northamptonshire, who was a cousin of Robert Catesby, one of the Gunpowder Plot conspirators; they had two sons and four daughters. His wife predeceased him.

Political offices
Preceded by Sir Edward Coke	Speaker of the House of Commons; 1597-1598	Succeeded by Sir John Croke
