= Edward Coke =

English lawyer and judge (1552–1634)

The Right Honourable Sir Edward Coke
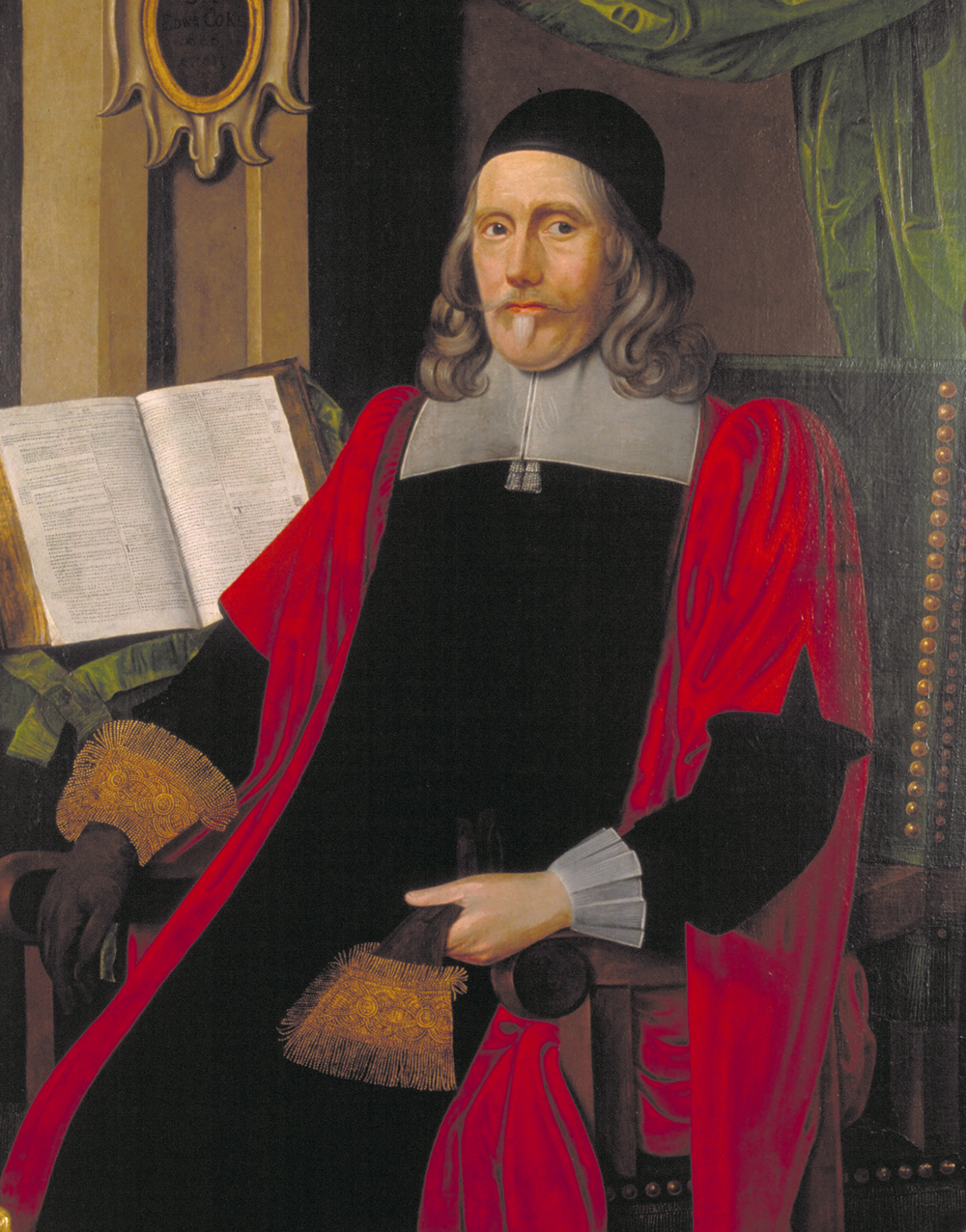
- Portrait by Gilbert Jackson, 1615

Chief Justice of the King's Bench
- In office 25 October 1613 – 15 November 1616
- Appointed by: James I
- Preceded by: Sir Thomas Fleming
- Succeeded by: Sir Henry Montagu

Chief Justice of the Common Pleas
- In office 30 June 1606 – 25 October 1613
- Appointed by: James I
- Preceded by: Sir Francis Gawdy
- Succeeded by: Sir Henry Hobart

Attorney General for England and Wales
- In office 10 April 1594 – 4 July 1606
- Appointed by: Elizabeth I
- Preceded by: Thomas Egerton
- Succeeded by: Sir Henry Hobart

Solicitor General for England and Wales
- In office 16 June 1592 – 10 April 1594
- Appointed by: Elizabeth I
- Preceded by: Thomas Egerton
- Succeeded by: Sir Thomas Fleming

Personal details
- Born: 1 February 1552 Mileham, Breckland, Norfolk, England
- Died: 3 September 1634 (aged 82) Stoke Poges, Buckinghamshire, England
- Spouse(s): Bridget Paston (died 1598); Elizabeth Cecil (died 1646)
- Education: Trinity College, Cambridge; Inner Temple
- Profession: Barrister; politician; judge

Sir Edward Coke (/kʊk/ CUUK, formerly /kuːk/; 1 February 1552 – 3 September 1634) was an English barrister, judge, and politician. He is often considered the greatest jurist of the Elizabethan and Jacobean eras.

Born into an upper-class family, Coke was educated at Trinity College, Cambridge, before leaving to study at the Inner Temple, where he was called to the Bar on 20 April 1578. As a barrister, he took part in several notable cases, including Slade's Case, before earning enough political favour to be elected to Parliament, where he served first as Solicitor General and then as Speaker of the House of Commons. Following a promotion to Attorney General he led the prosecution in several notable cases, including those against Robert Devereux, Sir Walter Raleigh, and the Gunpowder Plot conspirators. As a reward for his services he was first knighted and then made Chief Justice of the Common Pleas.

As Chief Justice, Coke restricted the use of the ex officio (Star Chamber) oath and, in the Case of Proclamations and Dr. Bonham's Case, declared the King to be subject to the law, and the laws of Parliament to be void if in violation of "common right and reason". These actions eventually led to his transfer to the Chief Justiceship of the King's Bench, where it was felt he could do less damage. Coke then successively restricted the definition of treason and declared a royal letter illegal, leading to his dismissal from the bench on 14 November 1616. With no chance of regaining his judicial posts, he instead returned to Parliament, where he swiftly became a leading member of the opposition. During his time as a Member of Parliament he wrote and campaigned for the Statute of Monopolies, which substantially restricted the ability of the monarch to grant patents, and authored and was instrumental in the passage of the Petition of Right, a document considered one of the three crucial constitutional documents of England, along with Magna Carta and the Bill of Rights 1689.

Coke is best known in modern times for his Institutes, described by John Rutledge as "almost the foundations of our law", and his Reports, which have been called "perhaps the single most influential series of named reports". Historically, he was a highly influential judge; within England and Wales, his statements and works were used to justify the right to silence, while the Statute of Monopolies is considered to be one of the first actions in the conflict between Parliament and monarch that led to the English Civil War. In America, Coke's decision in Dr. Bonham's Case was used to justify the voiding of both the Stamp Act 1765 and writs of assistance, which led to the American War of Independence; after the establishment of the United States his decisions and writings profoundly influenced the Third and Fourth amendments to the United States Constitution while necessitating the Sixteenth.

== Family background and early life ==
The surname "Coke", or "Cocke", can be traced back to a William Coke in the hundred of South Greenhoe, now the Norfolk town of Swaffham, in around 1150. The family was relatively prosperous and influential – members from the 14th century onwards included an undersheriff, a knight banneret, a barrister and a merchant. The name "Coke" was pronounced /ˈkuːk/ during the Elizabethan age, although it is now pronounced /ˈkʊk/. The origin of the name is uncertain: it has been suggested that "Coke" or "Cock" was a word meaning "river" or "chief" among the early Britons, but a more likely hypothesis is that the spelling arose from an attempt to disguise the word "cook". That "cook" and "coke" were homonyms at this time is shown by the fact that Coke's second wife, Elizabeth Hatton, regularly spelt his name "Cook" when writing to him.

Coke's father, Robert Coke, was a barrister and Bencher of Lincoln's Inn who built up a strong practice representing clients from his home area of Norfolk. Over time, he bought several manors at Congham, West Acre and Happisburgh, all in Norfolk, and was granted a coat of arms, becoming a minor member of the gentry. Coke's mother, Winifred Knightley, came from a family even more intimately linked with the law than her husband. Her father and grandfather had practised law in the Norfolk area, and her sister Audrey was married to Thomas Gawdy, a lawyer and Justice of the Court of King's Bench with links to the Earl of Arundel. This connection later served Edward well. Winifred's father later married Agnes, the sister of Nicholas Hare.

Edward Coke was born on 1 February 1552 in his father's manor of Mileham in Norfolk (acquired by him in 1553) one of eight children. The other seven were daughters – Winifred, Dorothy, Elizabeth, Ursula, Anna, Margaret and Ethelreda – although it is not known in which order the children were born. Two years after Robert Coke died on 15 November 1561, his widow married Robert Bozoun, a property trader noted for his piety and strong business acumen (once forcing Nicholas Bacon to pay an exorbitant amount of money for a piece of property). He had a tremendous influence on the Coke children: from Bozoun Coke learnt to "loathe concealers, prefer godly men and briskly do business with any willing client", something that shaped his future conduct as a lawyer, politician, and judge.

== Education and call to the Bar ==
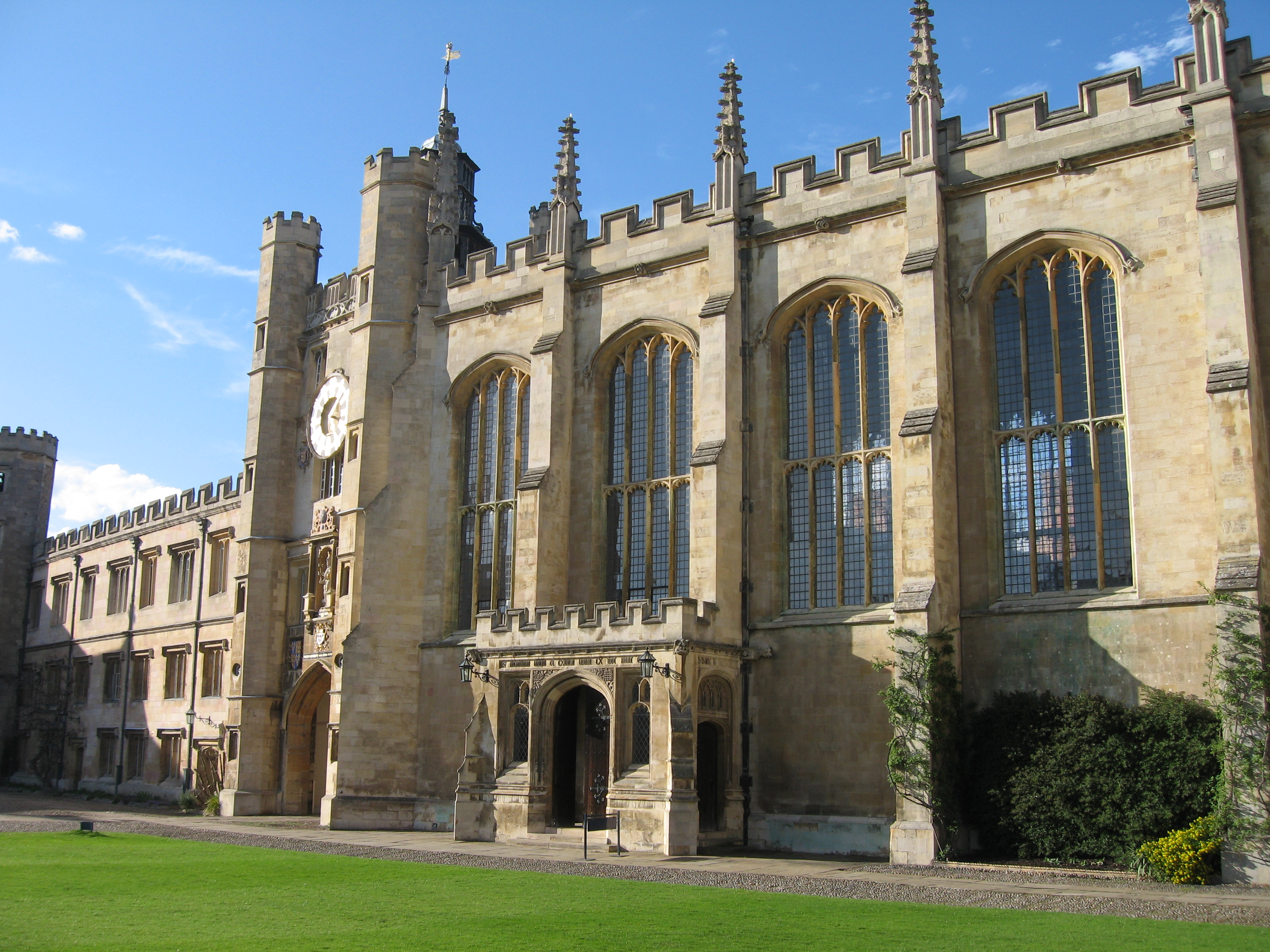
Trinity College, Cambridge, where Coke studied between 1567 and 1570

At the age of eight in 1560, Coke began studying at the Norwich Free Grammar School. The education there was based on erudition, the eventual goal being that by the age of 18 the students would have learned "to vary one sentence diversely, to make a verse exactly, to endight an epistle eloquently and learnedly, to declaim of a theme simple, and last of all to attain some competent knowledge of the Greek tongue". The students were taught rhetoric based on the Rhetorica ad Herennium, and Greek centred on the works of Homer and Virgil. Coke was taught at Norwich to value the "forcefulness of freedom of speech", something he later applied as a judge. Some accounts relate that he was a diligent student who applied himself well.

After leaving Norwich in 1567 he matriculated to Trinity College, Cambridge, where he studied for three years until the end of 1570, when he left without gaining a degree. Little is known of his time at Trinity, though he certainly studied rhetoric and dialectics under a program instituted in 1559. His biographers felt he had all the intelligence to be a good student, though a record of his academic achievements has not been found. Coke was proud of Cambridge and the time he spent there, later saying in Dr. Bonham's Case that Cambridge and Oxford were "the eyes and soul of the realm, from whence religion, the humanities, and learning were richly diffused into all parts of the realm."

After leaving Trinity College he travelled to London, where he became a member of Clifford's Inn in 1571. This was to learn the basics of the law – the Inns of Chancery, including Clifford's Inn, provided initial legal education before transfer to the Inns of Court, where one could be called to the Bar and practise as a barrister. Students were educated through arguments and debates – they would be given precedents and writs each day, discuss them at the dinner table and then argue a moot court based on those precedents and their discussions. Coke also studied various writs "till they turned honey sweet on his tongue", and after completing this stage of his legal education transferred to the Inner Temple on 24 April 1572.

At the Inner Temple, he began the second stage of his education, reading legal texts such as Glanville's Treatises and taking part in moots. He took little interest in the theatrical performances or other cultural events at the Inns, preferring to spend his time at the law courts in Westminster Hall, listening to the Serjeants argue. After six years at the Inner Temple he was called to the Bar on 20 April 1578, a remarkably fast rate of progress given the process of legal education at the time, which normally required eight years of study. Polson, a biographer of Coke, suggests that this was due to his knowledge of the law, which "excited the Benchers".

== Practice as a barrister ==
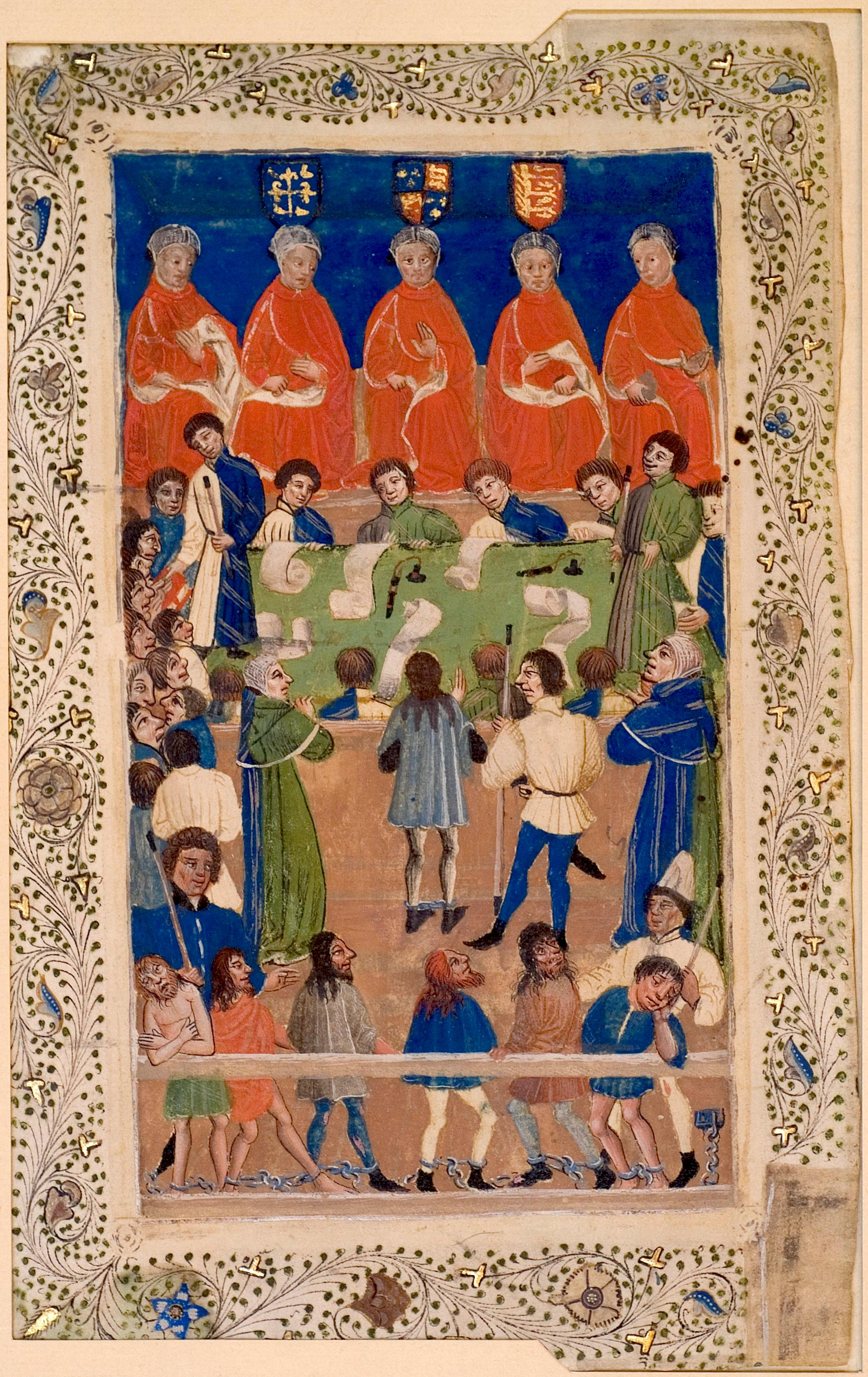
The Court of King's Bench, where Coke brought his first case

After being called to the Bar on 20 April 1578 Coke immediately began practising as a barrister. His first case was in the Court of King's Bench in 1581, and was known as Lord Cromwell's Case after the claimant, Henry, Lord Cromwell, a landlord in Coke's home county of Norfolk. The case was a charge of slander against a Mr Denny, the Vicar of Northlinham and Coke's client. In a dispute with Denny, Cromwell had hired two unlicensed preachers to harass him, denounce the Book of Common Prayer and preach the gospel in his area. Denny retorted by telling Cromwell "you like not of me, since you like those that maintain sedition". Cromwell argued that Denny was guilty of scandalum magnatum, slander against a peer of the realm because his statement implied that Cromwell himself was seditious or had seditious tendencies.

The case was actually two actions, with the first judgement being given in Denny's favour after Coke's research found a flaw in the pleadings that invalidated Cromwell's case. His counsel had worked from an inaccurate English copy of the Latin statute of scandalum magnatum which had mistranslated several passages, forcing them to start the case anew. After the case was restarted, Coke argued that Denny had commented on Cromwell's support of people attacking the Book of Common Prayer, and was not implying any deeper disloyalty. The judge ruled that Denny's statement had indeed meant this, and from this position of strength Coke forced a settlement. Coke was very proud of his actions in this case and later described it in his Reports as "an excellent point of learning in actions of slander". The next year he was elected Reader of Lyon's Inn for three years, something surprising considering his young age and likely related to his conduct in Lord Cromwell's Case. As Reader he was tasked with reading to the students at the Inn, a group that numbered about thirty at any one time, and the quality of his readings increased his reputation even further. His lectures were on the Statute of Uses, and his reputation was such that when he retired to his house after an outbreak of the plague, "nine Benchers, forty barristers, and others of the Inn accompanied him a considerable distance on his journey" in order to talk to him.

During the 1580s, Coke became intimately linked with the Howard family, the Dukes of Norfolk and Earls of Arundel. His uncle Thomas Gawdy had close links to Earl Arundel himself. In Norfolk Arundel held a liberty – he was essentially a local prince who appointed all officials, maintained his own prison, executed justice and bribed any royal clerks. His power base was his household, particularly the network of lawyers and stewards who held his estates together. Coke's uncle Thomas Gawdy had served as Steward to the Third Duke of Norfolk, and during the 1580s Coke was employed by the Howards to counter lawyers employed by the Crown, who argued that the Howards' lands were forfeit owing to the treason of the 4th Duke. As well as defeating these direct attacks Coke travelled to Cardiff to answer a challenge by Francis Dacre, son of William Dacre, 3rd Baron Dacre and uncle-in-law to the 4th Duke's three sons, Philip Howard and his two half-brothers, Thomas Howard, 1st Earl of Suffolk and Lord William Howard – he proved that Dacre's evidence was false and had the case dismissed.

Coke became involved in the now classic Shelley's Case in 1581, which created a rule in real property that is still used in some common law jurisdictions today; the case also established Coke's reputation as an attorney and case reporter. His next famous case was Chudleigh's Case, a dispute over the interpretation of the Statute of Uses, followed by Slade's Case, a dispute between the Common Pleas and King's Bench over assumpsit now regarded as a classic example of the friction between the two courts and the forward movement of contract law; Coke's argument in Slade's Case formed the first definition of consideration.

== Politics ==
Thanks to his work on their behalf, Coke had earned the favour of the Dukes of Norfolk. When he secured the Lordship of Aldeburgh for them in 1588 he also obtained the Aldeburgh parliamentary constituency, which elected two Members of Parliament (MPs). With their support, Coke was returned for Aldeburgh as an MP in February 1589.

=== Elizabeth I ===
==== Solicitor General and Speaker ====
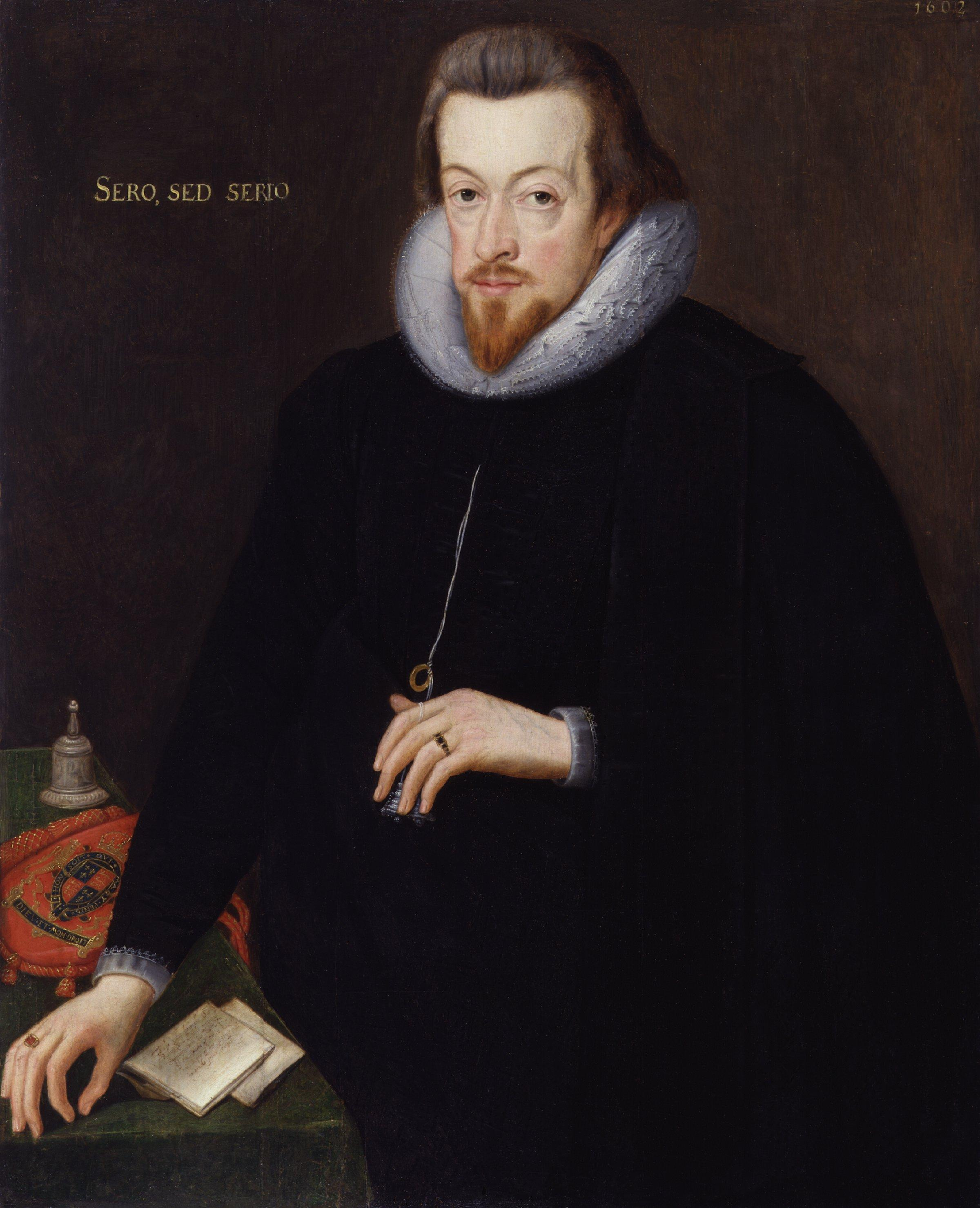
Robert Cecil, Coke's political ally who acted as a staunch defender of Elizabeth I

The political "old guard" began to change around the time Coke became a Member of Parliament. The Earl of Leicester died in 1588, followed by Sir Walter Mildmay, the Chancellor of the Exchequer, a year later, and Sir Francis Walsingham a year after that. In 1592 the Lord Chief Justice died and, according to custom the Attorney General, John Popham, succeeded him, with the Solicitor General, Thomas Egerton, succeeding Popham. This created a vacancy among the Law Officers of the Crown, and thanks to the influence of the Cecil family, Coke became Solicitor General on 16 June 1592. This was likely a narrow victory owing to Coke's defence of unpopular clients; he was summoned before Elizabeth I, who berated him until he cried before confirming him as Solicitor General.

Coke held the position only briefly; by the time he returned from a tour of Norfolk to discuss election strategy, he had been confirmed as Speaker of the House of Commons by the Privy Council, having been proposed by Francis Knollys and Thomas Heneage following his return to Parliament as MP for Norfolk. Coke held the positions of Speaker and Solicitor-General at the same time, although he did not take up his post as Speaker until the state opening of Parliament on 19 February 1593 (despite being confirmed on 28 January 1593).

After "disabling" himself in the House of Lords (a ceremony in which the incoming Speaker apologised for his failings) Parliament was suspended until 24 February; Coke returned two days later, having suffered from a stomach problem. The Parliament was intended to be a brief and simple one; with the Black Death resurgent throughout England and the threat of Spain on the horizon, the only matter was to impose certain taxes to fund the Queen's campaign against the Spanish, with no bills to be introduced. The taxes were paramount; subsidies collected in 1589 had been spent, and the war continued.

The idea of a calm, swift Parliament foundered on the rocks of religious conflict. On 27 February James Morice, a Puritan Member of Parliament, proposed two new bills: one against the bishops of the Church of England, and the other against the Court of High Commission. Morice was placed under house arrest, and seven Members of Parliament were later arrested, but the bills remained in Parliament. They were defended by Francis Knollys, one of the few remaining Puritan Members of Parliament, while other Puritans spat and coughed to drown out speeches by opponents.

Coke and Cecil, the government's two strongest defenders in Parliament, made several efforts to put off or end the debate over the bills. Cecil first pointed out that the Queen had forbidden bills on religion; Parliament ignored him, and the bill went ahead. Coke, as Speaker of the House of Commons (whose job was to schedule any bills), conducted a delaying campaign, first suggesting that the bill was too long to be read in the morning and then that it be delegated to a committee; both suggestions were voted down by the Commons. Coke continued talking until the end of the Parliamentary day in a filibuster action, granting a day of delay for the government. Immediately afterwards, Coke was summoned by the Queen, who made it clear that any action on the bills would be considered evidence of disloyalty. The warning was accepted by the Commons, and no more action was taken on the two Puritan bills.

==== Attorney General ====
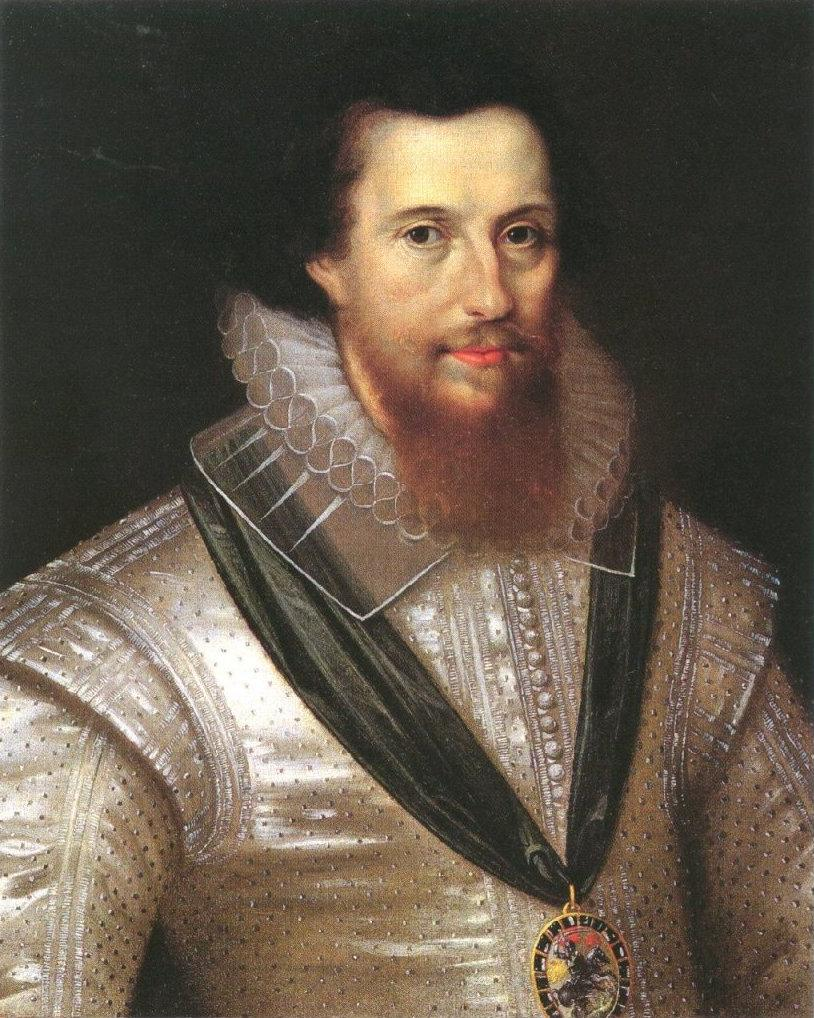
Robert Devereux, Cecil and Coke's main political rival

On 10 April 1594, Coke was made Attorney General for England and Wales thanks to his partnership with the Cecil family. Francis Bacon, his rival, was supported by Robert Devereux, who waged a constant war against Robert Cecil for control of the English government. The position of Master of the Rolls had become vacant in April 1593, and Coke was expected to be appointed according to convention; Bacon, therefore, would become Attorney General. Coke reacted by becoming even more dogmatic in his actions on behalf of the Crown, and when Devereux approached the queen on Bacon's behalf, she replied that even Bacon's uncle Lord Burghley considered him the second best candidate, after Coke. The Attorney General was the main prosecutor of the Crown, expected to bring all charges on its behalf and serve as its legal advisor in any situation. Coke was appointed in a time of particular difficulty; besides famine and the conflict with Spain, war had recently broken out in Ireland.

Coke primarily dealt with matters of treason, such as the cases of Sir John Smythe and Edward Squire. He also handled religious incidents such as the disputes between the Jesuits and the Church of England, personally interrogating John Gerard after his capture. As the 1590s continued, the infighting between Cecil and Devereux persisted, with Devereux's raid on Cádiz earning him national fame. In March 1599 Devereux was sent to defeat the growing rebellion in Ireland and was given command of 18,000 men, but by November his army was reduced to 4,000, the rest "frittered away" in exchange for "[conquering] nothing".

On 5 June 1600, he faced a panel of Privy Councillors, judges and members of the nobility at York House, where he was charged with appointing generals without the Queen's permission, ignoring orders and negotiating "very basely" with the leader of the rebel forces. While the members of the nobility wished to be gentle with Devereux, the lawyers and judges felt differently, recommending fines and confinement in the Tower of London. In the end a compromise was reached, with Devereux put under house arrest and dismissed from all his government offices.

Devereux immediately began plotting rebellion. Orders were sent out for "bedding" and "draperies" – codenames for weapons – and rebellious gentlemen gathered at Essex House to hear him talk of Elizabeth's "crooked mind and crooked carcass". In response, Coke and Cecil began a counter-plot. In 1599, Sir John Hayward had written and published The First Part of the Life and Raigne of King Henrie IV, dedicating it to Devereux. Elizabeth, furious, banned the book, suggesting that it was a "seditious prelude" intended to show her as a corrupt and poor monarch. Against the backdrop of Devereux's plot, Coke and Cecil started a new investigation into the book, hoping to prove some involvement of Devereux in the publishing. Coke interviewed Hayward's licensing cleric, Samuel Harsnett, who complained that the dedication had been "foisted" on him by Devereux. In reaction, Coke decided to bring charges of treason against Devereux, saying that he had "plotted and practised with the Pope and king of Spain for the deposing and selling of himself as well as the crown of England ... His permitting underhand that treasonable book of Henry IV to be printed and published; it being plainly deciphered, not only by the matter, and by the epistle itself, for what end and for whose behalf it was made, but also the Earl himself being present so often at the playing thereof, and with great applause giving countenance to it".

The charges were never brought because of an incident that soon transpired. On 8 February 1601 Devereux ordered his followers to meet at Essex House. A day later a group of emissaries led by Thomas Egerton and John Popham were sent to Devereux and immediately taken hostage. After a failed attempt to garner support from the population of London, Devereux found himself surrounded in Essex House; after burning his personal papers, he surrendered. On 19 February he was tried for treason, along with the Earl of Southampton. Coke led the case for the government, and Devereux was found guilty and executed; the Earl of Southampton was reprieved.

=== James I ===
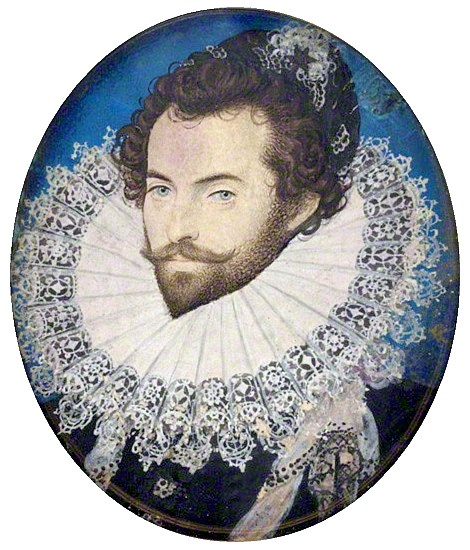
Sir Walter Raleigh, whom Coke prosecuted for treason

On 24 March 1603, Elizabeth I died. James VI of Scotland set out to claim the English throne, taking the title James I, and the Cokes immediately began ingratiating themselves with the new monarch and his family. Elizabeth Hatton, Coke's wife, travelled to Scotland to meet Anne of Denmark, the incoming Queen, and "the high-tempered beauty somehow pleased that withdrawn, strong-willed woman ... for as long as Anna lived ... Lady Hatton and her husband would retain the queen's affection and trust". Coke attended divine service with the new king on 22 May, who, following the service, took a sword from his bodyguard and knighted Coke. Coke was reconfirmed as Attorney General under James, and immediately found himself dealing with "a series of treasons, whether real or imaginary". The first of these was the trial of Sir Walter Raleigh; according to Cuthbert William Johnson, one of Coke's biographers, "There is, perhaps, no reported case in which the proofs against the prisoner were weaker than in this trial ... never was an accused person condemned on slighter grounds".

Raleigh was brought to trial on 17 November 1603, on charges of "conspiring to deprive the King of his Government; to alter religion; to bring in the Roman superstition; and to procure foreign enemies to invade the kingdom". The government alleged that on 11 June 1603, Raleigh had met with Lord Cobham, and they had agreed to bring Lady Arbella Stuart (a great great granddaughter of Henry VII) to the English throne, and to accept 600,000 marks from the Spanish government. As such, Raleigh was charged with supporting Stuart's claim to the throne and claiming Spanish money. He pleaded not guilty, with Coke's only evidence being a confession from Cobham, who was described as "a weak and unprincipled creature ... who said one thing at one time, and another thing in another, and could be relied upon in nothing". This case was "no case at all ... It supports the general charges in the indictment only by the vaguest possible reference to 'these practices,' and 'plots and invasions' of which no more is said".

Coke's behaviour during the trial has been repeatedly criticised; on this weak evidence, he called Raleigh a "notorious traitor", "vile viper" and "damnable atheist", perverting the law and using every slip of the tongue as a way of further showing Raleigh's guilt. Raleigh was found guilty and imprisoned in the Tower of London for more than a decade before finally being executed. It is generally concluded that the trial was biased strongly against Raleigh, although the assessment of Coke varies. While Magruder, in the Scottish Law Review, writes that Coke's "fair fame was tarnished and outraged" by his part in the trial, Boyer notes that Coke was, above all, loyal. He prosecuted Raleigh in that fashion because he had been asked to show Raleigh's guilt by the king, and as Attorney General, Coke was bound to obey.

The next significant government prosecution was the trial of the eight main Gunpowder Plot conspirators in Westminster Hall. The men were indicted on 27 January 1605 and tried by the Lords Commissioners. Coke conducted the prosecution for the government – an easy one, since the conspirators had no legal representation – and through his speeches, "blacken[ed] them in the eyes of the world". The conspirators were all sentenced to death and died through various means. Due to his judicial appointment, this was the last important prosecution Coke participated in.

In 1606 Coke reported the Star Chamber case De Libellis Famosis, which ruled that truth was not a defence against an accusation of seditious libel, and also held that ordinary common law courts could enforce this, a doctrine which thus outlived the Star Chamber after its abolition in 1642.

== Judicial work ==
Coke's first judicial postings came under Elizabeth; in 1585, he was made Recorder of Coventry, in 1587 Norwich, and in 1592 Recorder of London, a position he resigned upon his appointment as Solicitor General.

=== Common Pleas ===
On 20 June 1606, Coke was made a Serjeant-at-Law, a requirement for his elevation to Chief Justice of the Common Pleas, which occurred on 30 June. His conduct was noted by Johnson as "from the first, excellent; ever perfectly upright and fearlessly independent", although the convention of the day was that the judges held their positions only at the pleasure of the monarch. A biographer of Francis Bacon noted that "[t]he most offensive of Attorney Generals[sic] transformed into the most admired and venerated of Judges". Some assert that Coke became Chief Justice due to his prosecutions of Raleigh and the Gunpowder Plot conspirators, but there is no evidence to support this; instead, it was traditional at the time that a retiring Chief Justice would be replaced with the Attorney General.

==== Court of High Commission ====
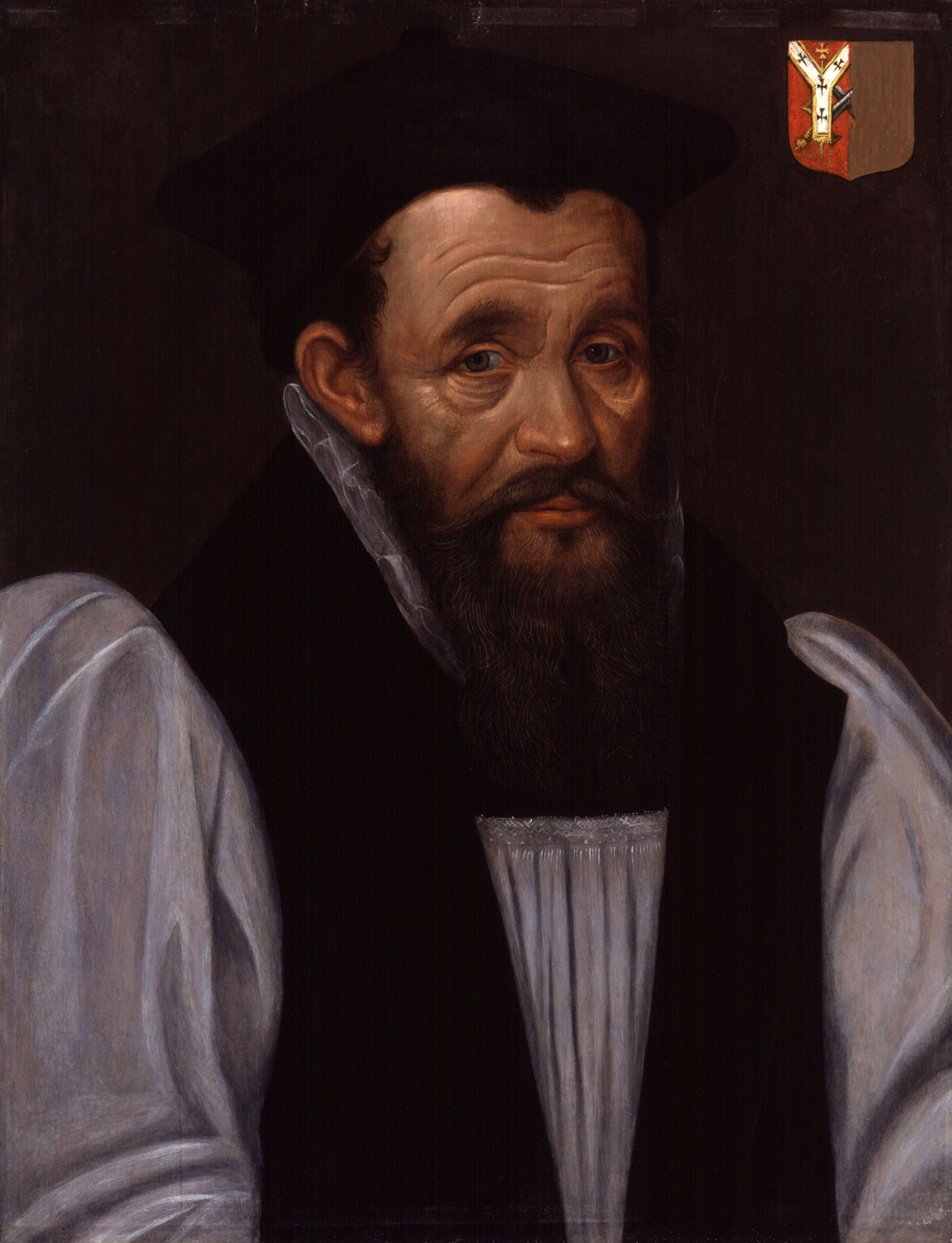
Richard Bancroft, who led the Court of High Commission during Coke's attacks on it

Coke's changed position from Attorney General to Chief Justice allowed him to openly attack organisations he had previously supported. His first target was the Court of High Commission, an ecclesiastical court established by the monarch with nearly unlimited power; it administered a mandatory ex officio oath that deliberately trapped people. The High Commission was vastly unpopular among both common lawyers and Members of Parliament, as the idea of "prerogative law" challenged both authorities. The appointment of Richard Bancroft as Archbishop of Canterbury in 1604 caused the issue to grow in importance; according to P.B. Waite, a Canadian historian, Bancroft's zeal and strictness "could hardly fail to produce an atmosphere in which principles and issues would crystallize, in which logic would supplant reasonableness". The judges, particularly Coke, began to unite with Parliament in challenging the High Commission. In 1607 Parliament openly asked for Coke's opinion on the High Commission's practices; he replied that "No man ecclesiastical or temporal shall be examined upon secret thoughts of his heart or of his secret opinion".

During this period a "notorious suit" ran through the courts, known as Fuller's Case after the defendant, Nicholas Fuller. A barrister, Fuller had several clients fined by the High Commission for non-conformity, and stated that the High Commission's procedure was "popish, under jurisdiction not of Christ but of anti-Christ". For this, Fuller was held in custody for contempt of court. The Court of King's Bench argued that this was a lay matter, while the High Commission claimed it fell under their jurisdiction. Coke had no official role, other than acting as a mediator between the two, but in the end, Fuller was convicted by the High Commission. This was a defeat for the common law, and in response, Coke spent the summer issuing writs of prohibition to again challenge Bancroft and the High Commission. On 6 November 1608, the common law judges and members of the High Commission were summoned before the king and told that they would argue and allow him to decide. Finding themselves unable to even argue coherently, instead "[standing] sullen, merely denying each others' statements", the group was dismissed and reconvened a week later. Coke, speaking for the judges, argued that the jurisdiction of the ecclesiastical courts was limited to cases where no temporal matters were involved and the rest left to the common law.

At this point, the King's own position in relation to the law, and his authority to decide this matter, was brought up, in what became known as the Case of Prohibitions. James stated that "In cases where there is no express authority in law, the King may himself decide in his royal person; the Judges are but delegates of the King". Coke challenged this, saying "the King in his own person cannot adjudge any case, either criminal – as treason, felony etc, or betwixt party and party; but this ought to be determined and adjudged in some court of justice, according to the Law and Custom of England". Coke further stated that "The common law protecteth the King", to which James replied "The King protecteth the law, and not the law the King! The King maketh judges and bishops. If the judges interpret the laws themselves and suffer none else to interpret, they may easily make, of the laws, shipmen's hose!". Coke rejected this, stating that while the monarch was not subject to any individual, he was subject to the law. Until he had gained sufficient knowledge of the law, he had no right to interpret it; he pointed out that such knowledge "demanded mastery of an artificial reason ... which requires long study and experience, before that a man can attain to the cognizance of it". Coke was only saved from imprisonment by Cecil, who pleaded with the King to show leniency, which he granted. After the conclusion of this dispute, Coke freely left, and continued to issue writs of prohibition against the High Commission.

==== Dr. Bonham's Case ====
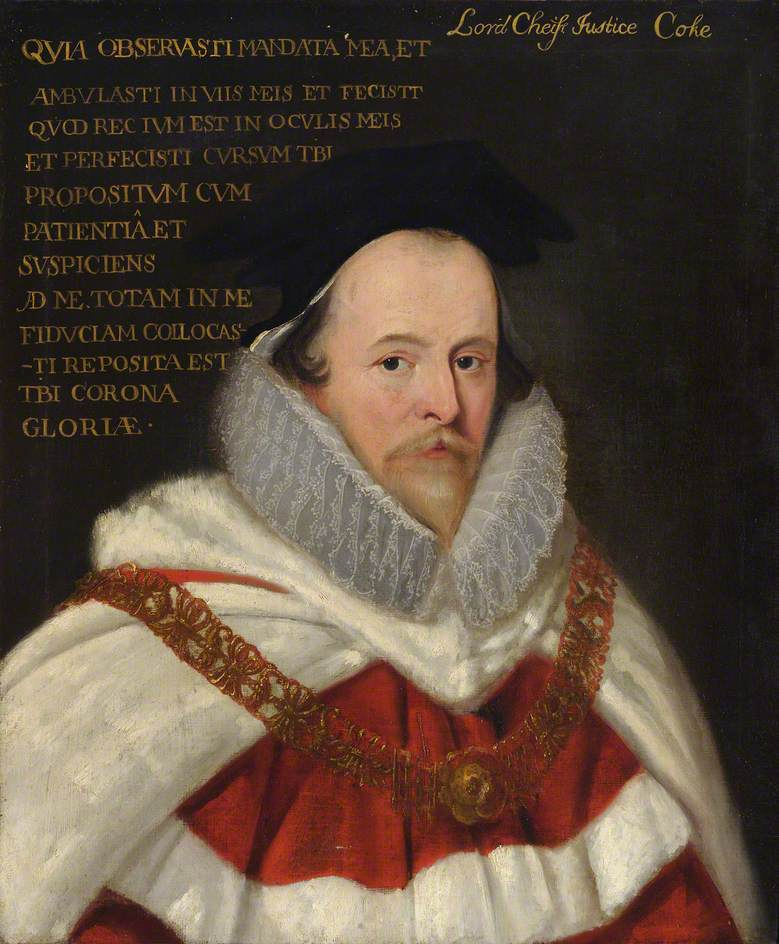
The meaning of Coke's ruling in Thomas Bonham v College of Physicians has been disputed over the years.

Thomas Bonham v College of Physicians, commonly known as Dr. Bonham's Case was a decision of the Court of Common Pleas under Coke in which he ruled that

in many cases, the common law will controul Acts of Parliament, and sometimes adjudge them to be utterly void: for when an Act of Parliament is against common right and reason, or repugnant, or impossible to be performed, the common law will controul it, and adjudge such Act to be void

Coke's meaning has been disputed over the years; some interpret his judgment as referring to judicial review of statutes to correct misunderstandings which would render them unfair, while others argue he meant that the common law courts have the power to completely strike down those statutes they deem to be repugnant.

Whatever Coke's meaning, after an initial period of application, Bonham's Case was thrown aside in favour of the growing doctrine of Parliamentary sovereignty. Initially written down by William Blackstone, this theory makes Parliament the sovereign law-maker, preventing the common law courts from not only throwing aside but also reviewing statutes in the fashion Coke suggested. Parliamentary sovereignty is now the near-universally-accepted judicial doctrine in England and Wales. Bonham's Case met a mixed reaction at the time, with the King and Lord Ellesmere both deeply unhappy with it. Nineteenth and twentieth-century academics are scarcely more favourable, calling it "a foolish doctrine alleged to have been laid down extra-judicially", and an "abortion".

In the United States, Coke's decision met with a better reaction. During the legal and public campaigns against the writs of assistance and Stamp Act 1765, Bonham's Case was given as a justification for nullifying the legislation. Marbury v. Madison, the American case which forms the basis for the exercise of judicial review in the United States under Article III of the Constitution, uses the words "void" and "repugnant", seen as a direct reference to Coke. Some academics, such as Edward Samuel Corwin, have argued that Coke's work in Bonham's Case forms the basis of judicial review and the declaration of legislation as unconstitutional in the United States. Gary L. McDowell calls this "one of the most enduring myths of American constitutional law and theory, to say nothing of history", pointing out that at no point during the Constitutional Convention was Bonham's Case referenced.

=== King's Bench ===
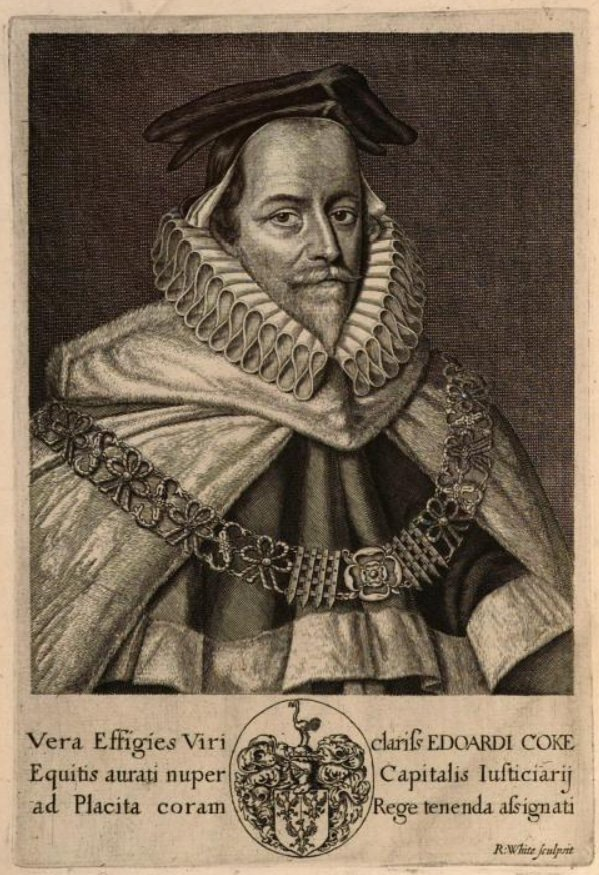
Edward Coke transferred to the Court of King's Bench on 25 October 1613.

Coke was transferred from the Common Pleas, where he was succeeded by Hobart, to the Court of King's Bench on 25 October 1613, on the advice of Bacon, presumably because Bacon and the King felt that if he was moved from a court dedicated to protecting the rights of the people to one dedicated to the rights of the King, "his capacity for harm would be diminished". From Bacon's point of view, the King's Bench was a far more precarious position for someone loyal to the common law rather than the monarch. Coke's first case of note there was Peacham's Case, in which he dictated that the writing of a sermon by the Puritan clergyman Edmund Peacham which advocated the death of the king – a sermon which was never preached or published – could not constitute treason. The King was unwilling to accept this decision and instead had him tried by Coke's opponents on the bench, who "not surprisingly" found him guilty, although his life was spared. Refusing to admit his guilt, Peacham was tortured on the rack, but "before torture, between torture and after torture; nothing could be drawn from him".

In 1616, two years after Peacham's Case, the case of commendams arose. The in commendam writ was a method of transferring ecclesiastical property, which James used in this case to allow Richard Neile to hold his bishopric and associated revenues without actually performing the duties. On 25 April 1616 the courts, at Coke's bidding, held that this action was illegal, writing to the king that "in case any letters come unto us contrary to law, we do nothing by such letters, but certify your Majesty thereof, and go forth to do the law notwithstanding the same". James called the judges before him and, furious, ripped up the letter, telling them that "I well know the true and ancient common law to be the most favourable to Kings of any law in the world, to which law I do advise you my Judges to apply your studies". While all the other judges "succumbed to royal pressure and, throwing themselves on their knees, prayed for pardon", Coke defended the letter and stated that "When the case happens I shall do that which shall be fit for a judge to do".

This was the last straw; on advice from Bacon, who had long been jealous of Coke, James I suspended Coke from the Privy Council, forbade him from going on circuit and, on 14 November, dismissed him from his post as Chief Justice of the King's Bench. This was greeted by deep resentment in the country, which saw the King's actions as tampering with justice. Coke himself reacted by sinking into a deep depression. James I then ordered Coke to spend his time "expunging and retracting such novelties and errors and offensive conceits as are dispersed in his Reports". Bacon, now in royal favour, became Lord Chancellor on 3 March 1617 and set up a commission to purge the Reports, also using his authority to expand the powers of the High Commission. With James unable to declare Coke incompetent, some of what Humphry William Woolrych describes as "colourable excuses" were produced to justify Coke's dismissal; he was accused of concealing £12,000, uttering "high words of contempt" as a judge, and declaring himself Chief Justice of England.

== Return to politics ==
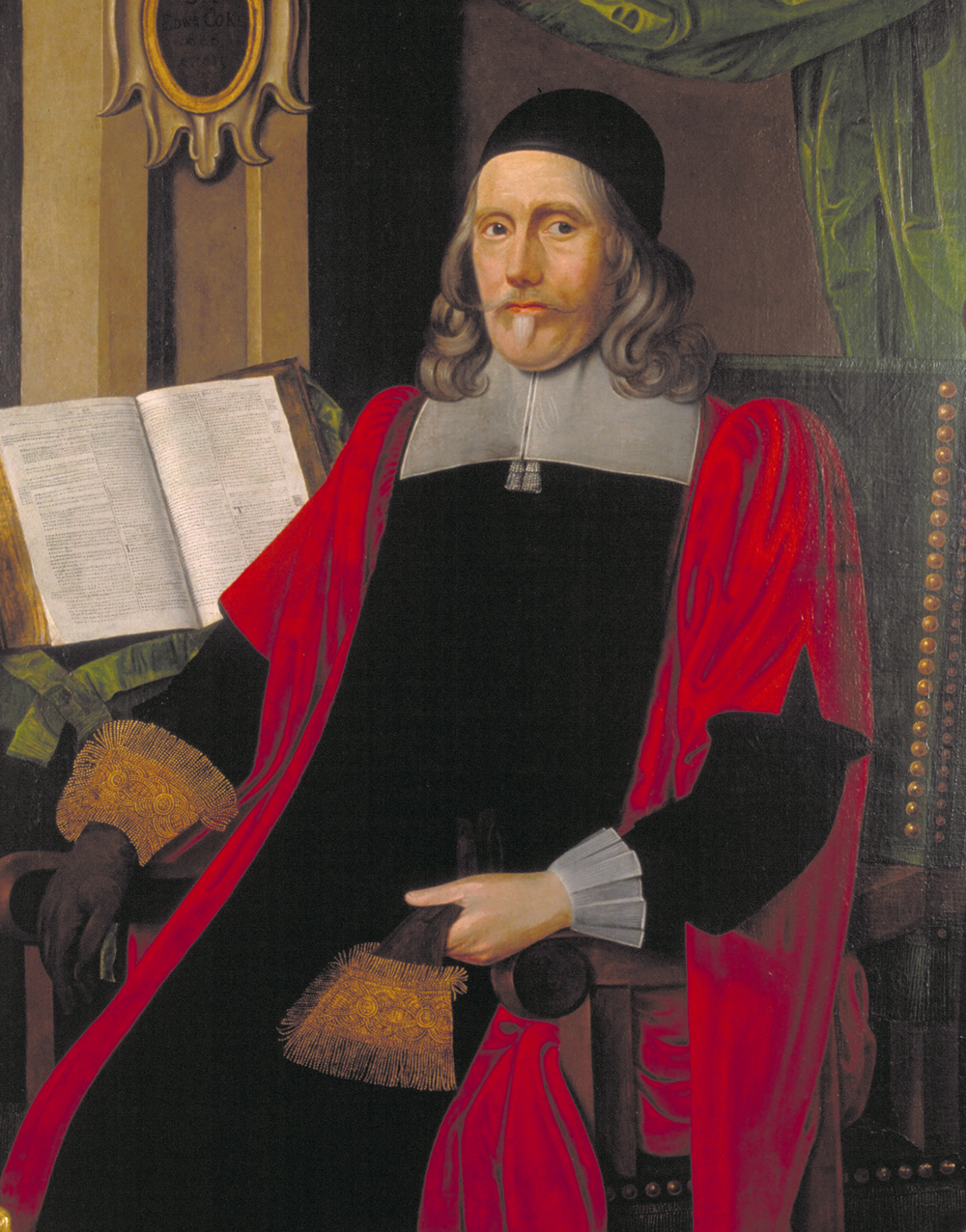
In June 1614, Edward Coke was unanimously elected High Steward of the University of Cambridge. Portrait by Gilbert Jackson in the Guildhall Art Gallery, London.

Now out of favour and with no chance of returning to the judiciary, Coke was re-elected to Parliament as an MP, ironically by order of the King, who expected Coke to support his efforts. Elected in 1620, Coke sat for Liskeard in the 1621 Parliament, which was called by the King to raise revenues; other topics of discussion included a proposed marriage between the Prince of Wales and Maria Anna of Spain, and possible military support for the King's son-in-law, Frederick V, Elector Palatine. Coke became a leading opposition MP, along with Robert Phelips, Thomas Wentworth and John Pym, campaigning against any military intervention and the marriage of the Prince of Wales and Maria Anna. His position at the head of the opposition was unsurprising given his extensive experience in both local and central government, as well as his ability to speak with authority on matters of economics, parliamentary procedure and the law. He subsequently sat as MP for Coventry (1624), Norfolk (1625) and Buckinghamshire (1628).

In June 1614, the University of Cambridge by unanimous vote elected Coke High Steward, an honorary office immediately below Chancellor of the University. Through Cecil, (previously High Steward and then Chancellor of Cambridge), Coke had procured for the university the right to send its own two representatives to Parliament, a matter of much practical benefit. A fervent Cantabrigian, Coke had a habit of naming Cambridge first, including in Parliament. When reminded that precedence belonged to Oxford "by vote of the House", Coke persisted in giving Cambridge primacy. A Privy Counsellor, Sir Thomas Edmondes, interrupted with a rebuke. It was reported that Coke suggested Edmondes not bother worrying about the primacy of Oxford or Cambridge, given that he had not attended either university.

=== Monopolies ===
Coke used his role in Parliament as a leading opposition MP to attack patents, a system he had already criticised as a judge. Historically, English patent law was based on custom and the common law, not on statute. It began as the Crown granted patents as a form of economic protection to ensure high industrial production. As gifts from the Crown, there was no judicial review, oversight or consideration, and no actual law concerning patents. To boost England's economy, Edward II began encouraging foreign workmen and inventors to settle in England, offering letters of protection that protected them from guild policy on the condition that they train English apprentices and pass on their knowledge. The letters did not grant a full monopoly; rather they acted as a passport, allowing foreign workers to travel to England and practice their trade. This process continued for three centuries, with formal procedures set out in 1561 to issue letters patent to any new industry, allowing monopolies. The granting of these patents was highly popular with the monarch because of the potential for raising revenue; a patentee was expected to pay heavily for the patent, and unlike a tax raise (another method of raising Crown money) any public unrest as a result of the patent was normally directed at the patentee, not the monarch.

Over time, this system became more and more problematic; instead of temporary monopolies on specific, imported industries, long-term monopolies came about over more common commodities, including salt and starch. These monopolies led to a showdown between the Crown and Parliament, in which it was agreed in 1601 to turn the power to administer patents over to the common law courts; at the same time, Elizabeth revoked a number of the more restrictive and damaging monopolies. Even given a string of judicial decisions criticising and overruling such monopolies, James I, when he took the throne, continued using patents to create monopolies. Coke used his position in Parliament to attack these patents, which were, according to him, "now grown like hydras' heads; they grow up as fast as they are cut off". Coke succeeded in establishing the Committee of Grievances, a body chaired by him that abolished a large number of monopolies. This was followed by a wave of protest at the patent system. On 27 March 1621, James suggested the House of Commons draw up a list of the three most objectionable patents, and he would remove them, but by this time a statute was already being prepared by Coke. After passing on 12 May it was thrown out by the House of Lords, but a Statute of Monopolies was finally passed by Parliament on 25 May 1624.

In response to both this and Coke's establishment of a sub-committee to establish freedom of speech and discuss the rights of the Commons, James announced that "you usurp upon our prerogative royal and meddle with things far above your reach". He first adjourned Parliament and then forbade the Commons from discussing "matters of state at home or abroad". Ignoring this ban, Parliament issued a "Remonstrance to the King" on 11 December 1621, authored by Coke, in which they restated their liberties and right to discuss matters of state, claiming that such rights were the "ancient and undoubted birthright and inheritance of the subjects of England". After a debate, it was sent to James, who rejected it; the Commons instead resolved to enter it into the Journal of the Commons, which required no royal authorisation. In the presence of Parliament, the king reacted by tearing the offending page from the Journal, declaring that it should be "razed out of all memories and utterly annihilated", and then dissolved Parliament. Coke was then imprisoned in the Tower of London on 27 December, being released nine months later.

=== Liberty and the Resolutions ===
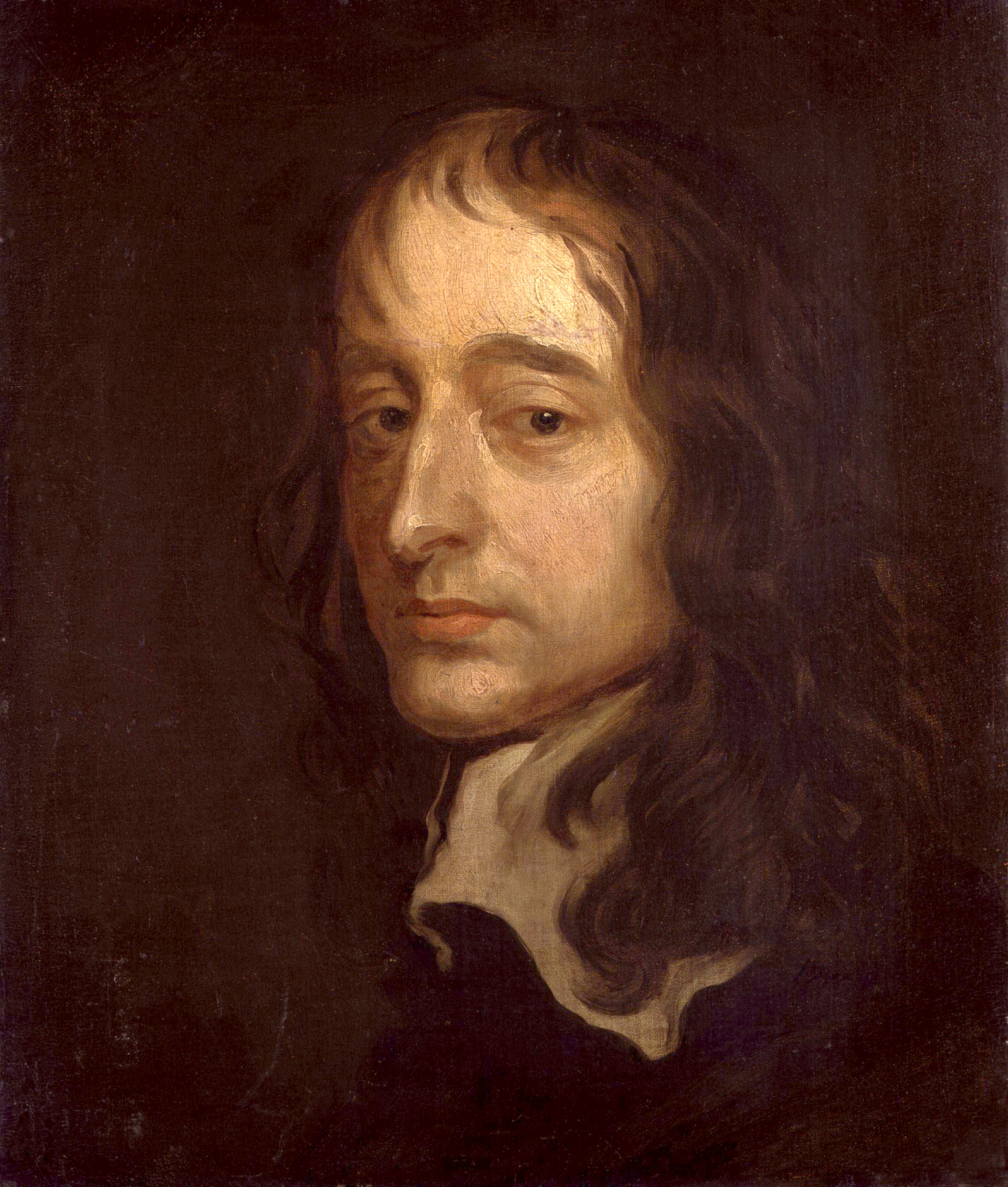
John Selden, who, along with Coke, presented the Resolutions to the House of Lords

James died on 27 March 1625 and was succeeded by his son, who became Charles I of England. Coke was made High Sheriff of Buckinghamshire by the king in 1625, which prohibited him from sitting in Parliament until his term expired a year later. Following his father's example, Charles raised loans without Parliament's sanction and imprisoned without trial those who would not pay. The judges of the Court of Common Pleas and King's Bench declared this to be illegal, and the Chief Justice Sir Ranulph Crewe was dismissed; at this, the remaining judges succumbed to the king's pressure. More and more people refused to pay, leading to Darnell's Case, in which the courts confirmed that "if no cause was given for the detention ... the prisoner could not be freed as the offence was probably too dangerous for public discussion". The result of this was that wealthy landowners refused to pay the loan and the Crown's income fell below Charles's expectations, forcing him to call a fresh Parliament in March 1627. With popular anger at Charles's policies, many MPs were opposed to him, including Pym, Coke and a young Oliver Cromwell.

Martial law was then declared, with continued imprisonment for a failure to pay the forced loans and soldiers billeted in the homes of private citizens to intimidate the population – something which led to Coke's famous declaration that "the house of an Englishman is to him as his castle". The Commons responded to these measures by insisting that Magna Carta, which expressly forbade the imprisonment of freemen without trial, was still valid. Coke then prepared the Resolutions, which later led to the Habeas Corpus Act 1679. These declared that Magna Carta was still in force, and that furthermore:

no freeman is to be committed or detained in prison, or otherwise restrained by command of the King or the Privy Council or any other, unless some lawful cause be shown ... the writ of habeas corpus cannot be denied, but should be granted to every man who is committed or detained in prison or otherwise restrained by the command of the King, the Privy Council or any other ... Any freeman so committed or detained in prison without cause being stated should be entitled to bail or be freed.

In addition, no tax or loan could be levied without Parliament's permission, and no private citizen could be forced into accepting soldiers into his home. Coke, John Selden and the rest of the Committee for Grievances presented the Resolutions to the House of Lords, with Coke citing seven statutes and 31 cases to support his argument. He told the Lords that "Imprisonment in law is a civil death [and] a prison without a prefixed time is a kind of hell". The Lords, supportive of the king, were not swayed, and Charles himself eventually rejected the Resolutions, insisting that the Commons trust him.

=== Petition of Right ===
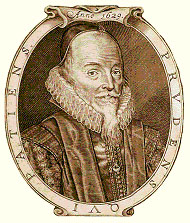
Coke at the time of the Petition of Right's passage

Coke undertook the central role in framing and writing the Petition of Right. The ongoing struggles over martial law and civil liberties, along with the rejection of the Resolutions seriously concerned the Commons. Accordingly, Coke convinced the Lords to meet with the Commons in April 1628 in order to discuss a petition to the King confirming the rights and liberties of royal subjects. The Commons immediately accepted this, and after a struggle, the Lords agreed to allow a committee chaired by Coke to draft the eventual document. Hearing of this, the King sent a message to Parliament forbidding the Commons from discussing matters of state. The resulting debate led to some MPs being unable to speak due to their fear that the King was threatening them with the destruction of Parliament. Coke, despite the fear in Parliament, stood and spoke, citing historical precedents supporting the principle that members of the Commons could, within Parliament, say whatever they wished – something now codified as Parliamentary privilege.

The Petition of Right was affirmed by the Commons and sent to the Lords, who approved it on 17 May 1628; the document's publication was met with bonfires and the ringing of church bells throughout England. As well as laying out a long list of statutes which had been broken, it proclaimed various "rights and liberties" of free Englishmen, including freedom from taxation without Parliamentary approval, the right of habeas corpus, a prohibition on soldiers being billeted in houses without the owner's will, and a prohibition on imposing martial law on civilians. It was later passed into formal law by the Long Parliament in 1641 and became one of the three constitutional documents of English civil liberties, along with Magna Carta and the Bill of Rights 1689.

== Retirement ==
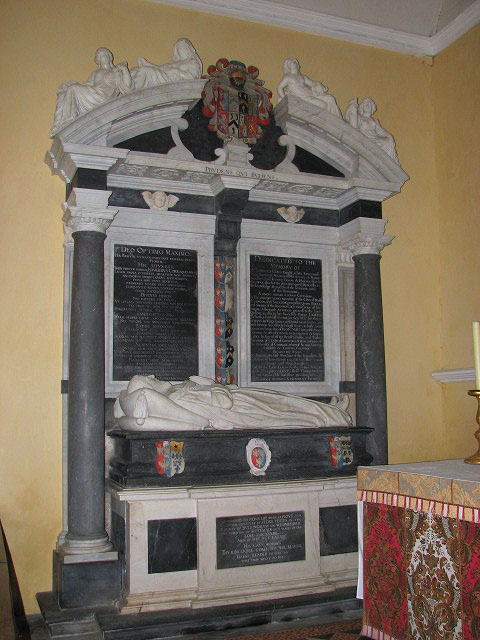
The monument to Edward Coke in St. Mary's Church, Tittleshall in Norfolk.

When Parliament was dissolved in 1629, Charles decided to govern without one, and Coke retired to his estate at Stoke Poges, Buckinghamshire, about 20 miles west of London, spending his time making revisions to his written works. He made no attempt to return to politics, stating that the Petition of Right would be left as his "greatest inheritance"; his desire to complete his writings, coupled with his advanced age, may also have been factors. Despite his age, Coke was still in good health, and exercised daily. Following an accident in which his horse fell on him, he refused to consult doctors, saying that he had "a disease which all the drugs of Asia, the gold of Africa, nor all the doctors of Europe could cure – old age", and instead chose to remain confined to the house without medical treatment. As he was on his deathbed the Privy Council ordered that his house and chambers be searched, seizing 50 manuscripts, which were later restored; his will was permanently lost.

Coke died on 3 September 1634, aged 82, and lay in state for a month at his home in Godwick to allow for friends and relatives to view the body. He remained a lifelong Anglican and was buried in St Mary's Church, Tittleshall, Norfolk. His grave is covered by a marble monument with his effigy lying on it in full judicial robes, surrounded by eight shields holding his coat of arms. A Latin inscription on the monument identifies him as "Father of twelve children and thirteen books". A second inscription, in English, gives a brief chronicle of his life and ends by stating that "His laste wordes [were] thy kingdome come, thye will be done. Learne, reader to live so, that thou may'st so die". Coke's estates passed to his son Henry.

== Personal life ==
Bridget Paston, Coke's first wife.

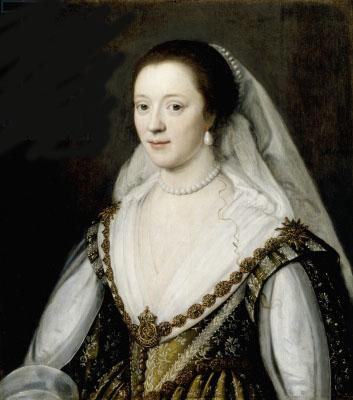
Coke's daughter Frances, Lady Purbeck, who caused a scandal by leaving her husband

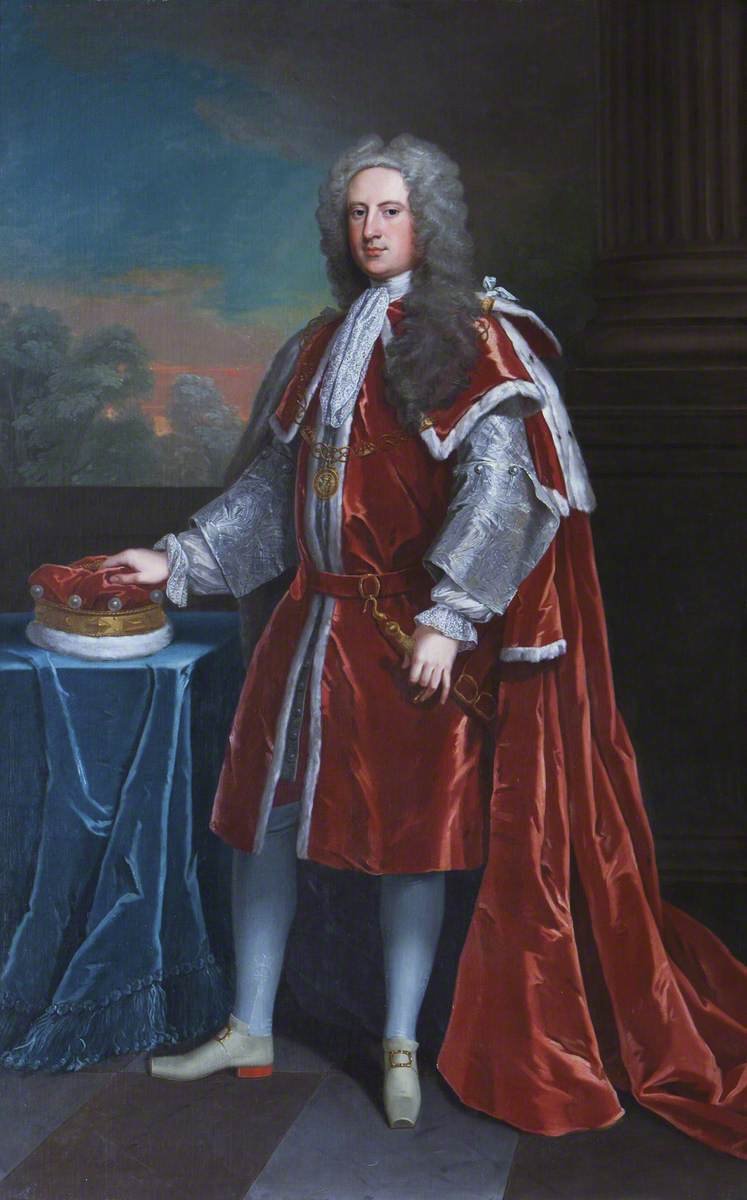
Coke's descendant Thomas Coke, 1st Earl of Leicester (fifth creation).

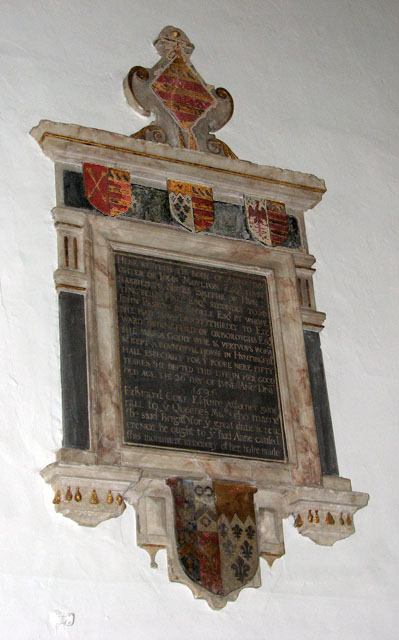
Monument erected by Sir Edward Coke in St Mary's Church, Huntingfield, Suffolk, to his mother-in-law Anne Moulton (d. 1595), of Huntingfield Hall, mother of Bridget Paston, as stated on the inscription. His arms at base impaling Paston

On 13 August 1582 Coke married Bridget, the daughter of John Paston, a Counsellor from Norwich. Paston came from a long line of lawyers and judges – his great grandfather, William Paston, was a Justice of the Court of Common Pleas. Having grown up nearby, Coke knew the family and asked for Bridget's hand immediately after she turned eighteen. At the time he was a thirty-one-year-old barrister with a strong practice, and her father had no qualms about accepting his offer. Six months after they married John Paston died, leaving his daughter and son-in-law his entire estate and several of his clients. Bridget maintained a diary, which reveals that she mainly ran the household. Despite this she was an independent woman, travelling without her husband and acting as a helpmate to Coke. Bridget was noted by Woolrych as an "incomparable" woman who had "inestimable value clearly manifested by the eulogies which are lavished on her character". The couple settled at the manor of Huntingfield, described by Catherine Drinker Bowen as "enchanting, with a legend for every turret ... A splendid gallery ran the length of the house, the Great Hall was built around six massive oaks which supported the roof as they grew".

The couple had ten children – seven sons and three daughters. The sons were Edward, Robert, Arthur, John, Henry, Clement and Thomas. Edward died young, Robert became a Knight Bachelor and married Theophila, daughter of Thomas Berkeley, Arthur married Elizabeth, heir of Sir George Walgrave, John married Meriel, daughter of Anthony Wheately, bringing Holkham Hall into the Coke family, Henry married Margaret, daughter of Richard Lovelace, and inherited the manor at Holkham from his brother John (who had seven daughters but no son), Clement married Sarah, heiress of Alexander Redich, and Thomas died as an infant. The daughters were Elizabeth, Anne and Bridget. Elizabeth died young, Anne married Ralph Sadleir, son and heir of Sir Thomas Sadleir, and Bridget married William Skinner, son and heir of Sir Vincent Skinner. Coke's descendants through Henry include the Earls of Leicester, particularly Coke of Norfolk, a landowner, Member of Parliament and agricultural reformer. Ironically in view of Coke's legal opposition to James I, a descendant of both Coke and James is Sarah Ferguson, formerly Duchess of York.

Following his first wife's death in 1598, Coke married Elizabeth Hatton, a desirable marriage due to her wealth; when he found out that Bacon was also pursuing her hand, Coke acted with all speed to complete the ceremony. It was held at a private house at the wrong time, rather than at a church between 8 and 12 in the morning; all involved parties were prosecuted for breaching ecclesiastical law, and Coke had to beg for a pardon. It is said that Coke first suggested marrying Hatton to Sir Robert Cecil, Hatton's uncle, at the funeral of Lord Burghley, Coke's patron; he needed to ensure that he would continue his rise under Burghley's son, Cecil, and did this by marrying into the family. Hatton was 26 years younger than Coke, hot-tempered and articulate; Boyer wrote that "if she and Coke were not compatible, at least they were well-matched". Their marriage having broken down in 1604, Hatton went on to become a formidable antagonist and thorn in his side. At his funeral she remarked, "We shall never see his like again, thanks be to God".

In 1602 he bought Minster Lovell, an Oxfordshire 15th-century manor house which had previously belonged to the Lovell family before it was forfeited to the state in 1485.

Coke was buried beside his first wife, who was called his "first and best wife" by his daughter Anne; his second wife died in 1646. Coke had two children with his second wife, both daughters: Elizabeth and Frances Coke, Viscountess Purbeck. Elizabeth married Sir Maurice Berkeley. Frances married John Villiers, Viscount Purbeck, but left him soon afterwards for her lover Sir Robert Howard, with whom she lived for many years, to the great scandal of the Court.

Of Coke's many children, the one who came at the last in his final years of life to manage his house at Stoke Poges and watch over him was ironically his youngest child, Frances Villiers. After Coke's dismissal as Chief Justice of the King's Bench, in an attempt to ingratiate himself with King James and his favourite, the Duke of Buckingham, Coke devised a plan to marry off his youngest daughter Frances to Buckingham's infirm older brother, Sir John Villiers. By transferring a marriage payment of £10,000 and other properties to Sir John Villiers, control of the funds would reside in the hands of Buckingham. This would lessen the pressure on the king to provide funds to his favourite. Sir John Villiers was an undesirable match for someone as beautiful and vibrant as Frances Coke. Frances and her mother, Lady Hatton, were determined to oppose the marriage. Lady Hatton, through a forged letter, claimed that Frances was promised to Henry de Vere, 18th Earl of Oxford, but the ploy was unsuccessful. To further thwart Coke's attempt, Frances and her mother, Lady Hatton, fled and hid in Sir Edmund Withipole's home. After searching many properties, Coke eventually found them there. With a band of ten retainers including his son Clem, the party crashed through the front door of Sir Withipole's house using a heavy piece of timber and found Frances and Lady Hatton upstairs. As Sir Edward dragged them apart, he commanded his daughter, "You will come home with me to Stoke". Frances was placed on a horse with her half-brother Clem and they raced away with Lady Hatton and her family members in hot pursuit. However, the muddy road conditions prevented Lady Hatton from rescuing her daughter. After a failed petition to the King by Lady Hatton through her friend (and Coke's arch-enemy) Sir Francis Bacon, in which Frances' dowry played an important role in securing the king's permission for the marriage to proceed as arranged by the bride's father, Frances was married off to Villiers against her will. Nevertheless, despite this tragic relationship trauma between father and daughter, Coke and his daughter eventually reconciled. Coke's final years with Frances devotedly by his side were very happy and peaceful ones for them both.

== Writings ==
Coke is best known for his written work – thirteen volumes of law reports, and the four-volume Institutes of the Lawes of England. John Marshall Gest, writing in the Yale Law Journal at the start of the twentieth century, noted that "There are few principles of the common law that can be studied without an examination of Coke's Institutes and Reports which summed up the legal learning of his time", although "the student is deterred by the too common abuse of Coke's character and the general criticism of his writings as dry, crabbed, verbose and pedantic". John Campbell, in The Lives of the Chief Justices of England, had said that "His reasoning... is narrow minded; [he had] utter contempt for method and style in his compositions", and says that Coke's Reports were "tinctured with quaintness and pedantry". Gest, noting this criticism, points out that:

Coke, like every man, was necessarily a product of the age in which he lived. His faults were the faults of his time, his excellencies those of all time. He was diffuse; he loved metaphor, literary quibbles and verbal conceits; so did Bacon, and so did Shakespeare. So did all the writers of his day. They were creative, not critical. But Coke as a law writer was as far superior in importance and merit to his predecessors, at least if we except Bracton, as the Elizabethan writers, in general, were superior to those whom they succeeded, and, as the great Elizabethans fixed the standard of our English tongue, so Coke established the common law on its firm foundation. A modern lawyer who heaps his abuse on Coke and his writings seems as ungrateful as a man who climbs a high wall with the aid of the sturdy shoulders of another and then gives his friend a parting kick in the face as he makes the final leap.

=== Reports ===
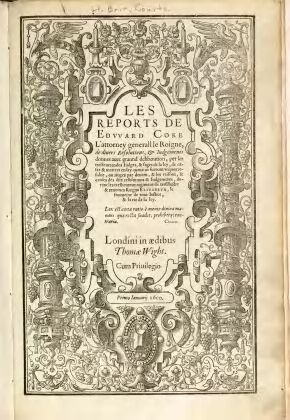
The engraved title page to the first volume of Coke's Reports (1600)

His Law Reports, known as Coke's Reports, were an archive of judgments from cases he had attended, in which he had participated or about which he had been informed. They started with notes he made as a law student in the winter of 1572, with full reporting of cases from October 1579. The Reports were initially written down in seven notebooks, four of which are lost; the first notebook contains not only law reports, but also a draft version of Coke's first Institutes of the Lawes of England. Coke began reporting cases in the traditional manner, by copying out and repeating cases found in earlier law reports, such as those of Edmund Plowden. After being called to the Bar in 1578 he began attending court cases at Westminster Hall, and soon drew the attention of court officials – many early reports have noted that he was told "by old Plowden" or "by Wray CJ". The original reports were kept in a generally chronological order, interspersed with personal memos, obituaries and notes on court practices. They are not entirely chronological; during his career, Coke took note of earlier cases which had drawn his attention. These were written down with the plea roll reference and the year in which Coke recorded them, but later editions failed to include the plea roll reference and led to inaccuracies.

The Reports have gained significant academic acclaim; writing in the Cornell Law Quarterly, Theodore Plucknett describes them as works of "incomparable richness" with a "profound influence upon the literature, and indeed the substance, of English law". John Baker has described them as "perhaps the single most influential series of named reports", and even Francis Bacon, Coke's rival, wrote in praise of them, saying "Had it not been for Sir Edward Coke's Reports (which though they may have errors, and some peremptory and extrajudicial resolutions more than are warranted, yet they contain infinite good decisions and rulings over of cases), for the law by this time had been almost like a ship without ballast; for that the cases of modern experience are fled from those that are adjudged and ruled in former time".

Although loaned to friends and family, and therefore in slight public circulation, Coke's Reports were never formally used during his lifetime. Select cases were published in 1600, containing the most famous of his decisions and pleadings, while the second volume in 1602 was more chronological in nature. The third part, published in the same year, was also chronological, while the fourth, published in 1604, was arranged by subject. The fifth part, published in 1605, is arranged similarly, as is the sixth, published in 1607. Five more volumes were published until 1615, but Coke died before he could publish a single-bound copy. No trace has been found of the draft manuscript.

Some academics have questioned the accuracy of the Reports. Coke's famous Case of Proclamations, and his speech there, was first brought into the public consciousness through its inclusion in Volume 12 of his Reports, and Roland G. Usher, writing in the English Historical Review, notes that "Certain manuscripts at Hatfield House and elsewhere seem to throw some doubt upon this famous account of a famous interview". One of the reasons given for possible inaccuracies in the later volumes of the Reports is that they were published posthumously. In July 1634, officials acting on the order of the King had seized Coke's papers, but a 1641 motion in the House of Commons restored the extant papers to Coke's eldest son. The twelfth and thirteenth volumes of the reports were based on fragments of notes several decades old, not on Coke's original manuscript.

=== Institutes ===
Coke's other main work was the Institutes of the Lawes of England, a four-volume treatise described as his "masterwork". The first volume, the Commentary upon Littleton, known as Coke on Littleton, was published in 1628. It is ostensibly a commentary on Sir Thomas Littleton's Treatise on Tenures, but actually covered many areas of the law of his time. The other three volumes were all published after his death, and covered 39 constitutional statutes of importance (starting with Magna Carta), the law relating to criminal law, and constitutional and administrative law, respectively. While the Reports were intended to give an explanation of the law chronologically, Coke's purpose was to provide an English language tutorial for students studying law at the Inns of Court. This served as an alternative to the Roman law lectures at university, which were based on Latin; according to Bowen, it was "a double vision; the Institutes as authority, the Reports as illustration by actual practise".

Part one, the Commentary upon Littleton, was undoubtedly the most famous; copies were exported to the United States early in the colonial era. The work was first printed in an American edition in 1812, by which point the English version was in its sixteenth edition, and had been commented on itself by various later legal authorities. As with the Reports, Coke's Institutes became a standard textbook in the United States, and was recorded in the law libraries of Harvard College in 1723 and Brown University in 1770; John Jay, John Adams, Theophilus Parsons and Thomas Jefferson were all influenced by it. John Rutledge later wrote that "Coke's Institutes seems to be almost the foundations of our law", while Jefferson stated that "a sounder Whig never wrote more profound learning in the orthodox doctrine of British liberties". The Third Institutes has been described as "the first really adequate discussion of treason, a work which went far towards offering the remedy of a humanized common law to the injustices of trial procedures".

The work had its detractors, with some writers criticising it for "repulsive pedantry" and "overbearing assertions", as well as incorrect citations to works that were later discredited. There are also factual inaccuracies; Kenyon Homfray in the Ecclesiastical Law Journal notes that, despite being considered the supreme legal authority on the subject of consecration, which Coke covered in the third volume of the Institutes, he offered no legal support for his opinion and ignored those pieces of case law which rejected his interpretation.

=== Jurisprudence ===
Coke's jurisprudence centres on the hierarchy of the judges, the monarch, and Parliament in making law. Coke argued that the judges of the common law were those most suited to making law, followed by Parliament, and that the monarch was bound to follow any legal rules. This principle was justified by the idea that a judge, through his professional training, internalised what political historian and theorist Alan Cromartie referred to as "an infinity of wisdom", something that mere politicians or laypersons could not understand due to the complexity of the law. Coke's Commentary on Littleton has been interpreted as deliberately obtuse, with his aim being to write what Cromartie called "a sort of anti-textbook, a work whose very form denied that legal knowledge could be organised. The original edition could not be used for reference purposes, as Coke had published it without an index ... It is a book to be 'read in' and lived with, rather than consulted, a monument to the uselessness of merely written knowledge unless it is internalised in a trained professional mind". This theory – that judges were the natural arbiters of the law – is known as the "appeal to reason", with "reason" referring not to rationality but the method and logic used by judges in upholding and striking down laws. Coke's position meant that certainty of the law and intellectual beauty was the way to see if a law was just and correct, and that the system of law could eventually become sophisticated enough to be predictable.

John Selden similarly thought that the common law was the proper law of England. He argued that this did not necessarily create judicial discretion to alter it, and that proper did not necessarily equal perfect. The law was nothing more than a contract made by the English people; this is known as the "appeal to contract". Thomas Hobbes and Francis Bacon argued against Coke's theory. They were proponents of natural law, created by the King's authority, not by any individual judge. Hobbes felt that there was no skill unique to lawyers, and that the law could be understood not through Coke's "reason" (the method used by lawyers), but through understanding the King's instructions. While judges did make law, this was only valid because it was "tacitly confirmed (because not disapproved) by the [King]".

== Legacy ==
Coke's challenge to the ecclesiastical courts and their ex officio oath is seen as the origin of the right to silence. With his decision that common law courts could issue writs of prohibition against such oaths and his arguments that such oaths were contrary to the common law (as found in his Reports and Institutes), Coke "dealt the crucial blow to the oath ex officio and to the High Commission". The case of John Lilburne later confirmed that not only was such an oath invalid, but that there was a right to silence, drawing from Coke's decisions in reaching that conclusion. In the trial of Sir Roger Casement for treason in 1916, Coke's assertion that treason is defined as "giving aide and comfort to the King's enemies within the realme or without" was the deciding factor in finding him guilty. His work in Slade's Case led to the rise of modern contract law, and his actions in the Case of Proclamations and the other pleadings which led to his eventual dismissal went some way towards securing judicial independence. The Statute of Monopolies, the foundation for which was laid by Coke and which was drafted by him, is considered one of the first steps towards the eventual English Civil War, and also "one of the landmarks in the transition of [England's] economy from the feudal to the capitalist". The legal precept that no one may enter a home unless by invitation, was established as common law in Coke's Institutes. "For a man's house is his castle, et domus sua cuique est tutissimum refugium [and each man's home is his safest refuge]." It is the origin of the famous dictum, "an Englishman's home is his castle".

Coke was particularly influential in the United States both before and after the American War of Independence. During the legal and public campaigns against the writs of assistance and Stamp Act 1765, Bonham's Case was given as a justification for nullifying the legislation, and in the income tax case of 1895, Joseph Hodges Choate used Coke's argument that a tax upon the income of the property is a tax on the property itself to have the Supreme Court of the United States declare the Wilson–Gorman Tariff Act unconstitutional. This decision ultimately led to the passage of the Sixteenth Amendment. The castle doctrine originates from Coke's statement in the Third Institutes that "A man's home is his castle – for where shall he be safe if it not be in his house?", which also profoundly influenced the Fourth Amendment to the United States Constitution; the Third Amendment, on the other hand, was influenced by the Petition of Right. Coke was also a strong influence on and mentor of Roger Williams, an English theologian who founded the Rhode Island colony in North America and was an early proponent of the doctrine of separation of church and state.

== Character ==
Coke was noted as deriving great enjoyment from and working hard at the law, but enjoying little else. He was versed in the Latin classics and maintained a sizeable estate, but the law was his primary concern. Francis Bacon, his main competitor, was known as a philosopher and man of learning, but Coke had no interest in such subjects. Notably, when given a copy of the Novum Organum by Bacon, Coke wrote puerile insults in it.

Coke's style and attitude as a barrister are well documented. He was regarded, even during his life, as the greatest lawyer of his time in both reputation and monetary success. He was eloquent, effective, forceful, and occasionally overbearing. His most famous arguments can be read in Complete State Trials Volume I and II. Most early lawyers were not noted for their eloquence, with Thomas Elyot writing that "[they] lacked elocution and pronunciation, two of the principal parts of rhetorike", and Roger Ascham saying that "they do best when they cry loudest", describing a court case where an advocate was "roaring like a bull". In court, Coke was insulting to the parties, disrespectful to the judges and "rough, blustering, overbearing"; a rival once wrote to him saying "in your pleadings you were wont to insult over misery and to inveigh bitterly at the persons, which bred you many enemies". Coke was pedantic and technical, something which saw him win many cases as a barrister, but when he became Attorney General "he showed the same qualities in a less pleasing form ... He was determined to get a conviction by every means in his power".

Francis Watt, writing in the Juridical Review, portrays this as Coke's strongest characteristic as a lawyer: that he was a man who "having once taken up a point or become engaged in a case, believes in it with all his heart and soul, whilst all the time conscious of its weakness, as well as ready to resort to every device to bolster it up". Writers have struggled to reconcile his achievements as a judge surrounding the rejection of executive power and the rights of man with his tenure as Attorney General, with Gerald P. Bodet noting that his early career as a state prosecutor was one of "arrogance and brutality".

Coke made a fortune from purchasing estates with clouded titles at a discount, whereupon, through his knowledge of the intricacies of property law, he would clear the titles on the acquired properties to his favour. About the year 1615, his amassed property acquisitions attracted the attention of the government. James I claimed that Coke "had already as much land as it was proper a subject should possess". The story goes that Coke requested the King's permission to just "add one acre more" to his holdings, and upon approval proceeded to purchase the fine estate of Castle Acre Priory in Norfolk, one of the most expensive "acres" in the land.

Coke's final words were "Thy kingdome come, thye will be done".

== Works ==
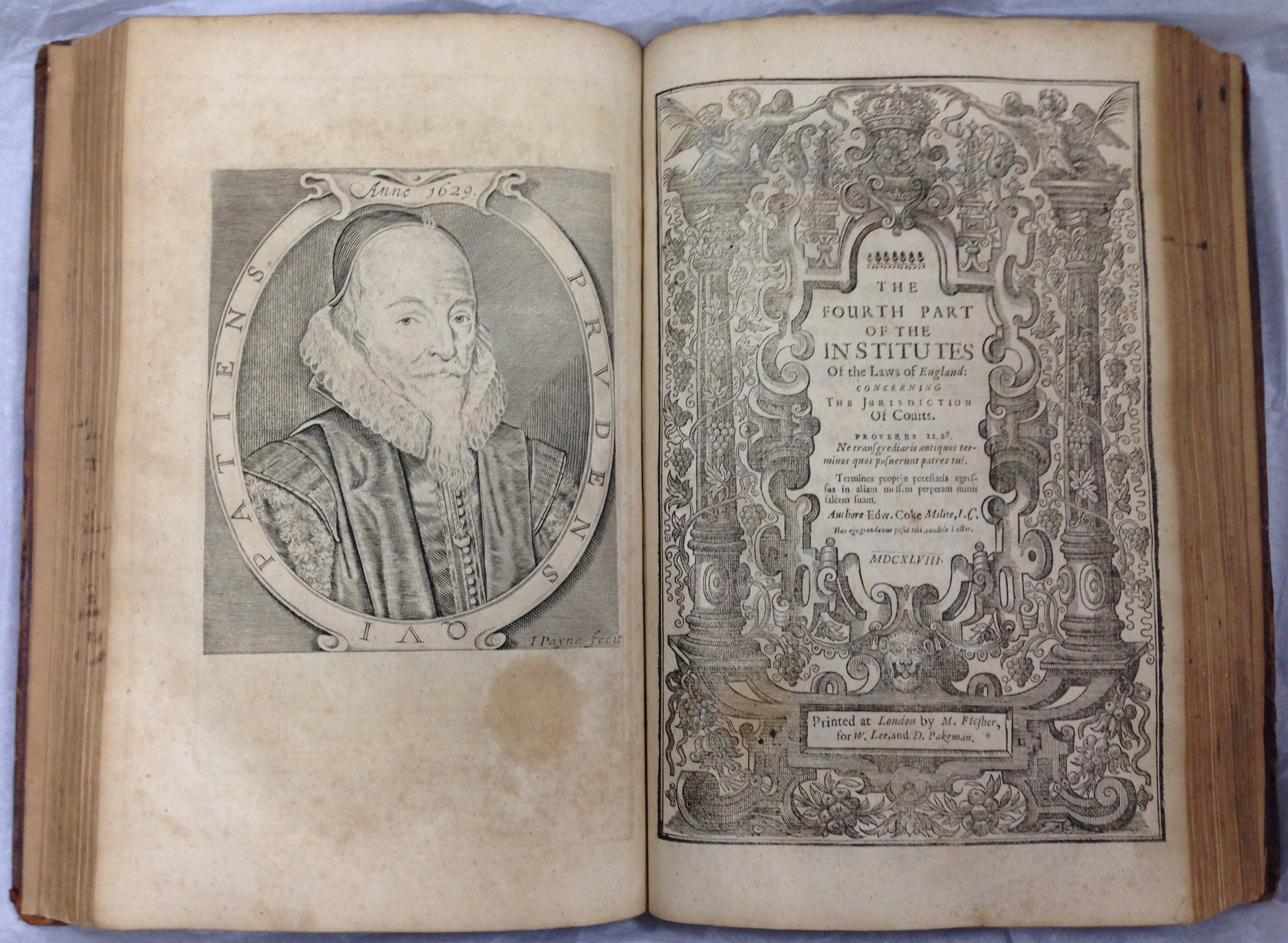
The Fourth Part of the Institutes of the Laws of England (2nd ed., 1648, frontispiece and title page)

- Institutes of the laws of England. Vol. 1st part (1 ed.). London: Society of Stationers. 1628.
- Institutes of the laws of England. Vol. 2nd part (2 ed.). London: Miles Flesher per William Lee & Daniel Pakeman. 1642.
- Institutes of the laws of England. Vol. 3d part (2 ed.). London: Miles Flesher per William Lee & Daniel Pakeman. 1648.
- Institutes of the laws of England. Vol. 4th part (2 ed.). London: Miles Flesher per William Lee & Daniel Pakeman. 1644.
- Reports. Vol. 1. London: Joseph Butterworth. 1826.
- Reports. Vol. 2. London: Joseph Butterworth. 1826.
- Reports. Vol. 3. London: Joseph Butterworth. 1826.
- Reports. Vol. 4. London: Joseph Butterworth. 1826.
- Reports. Vol. 5. London: Joseph Butterworth. 1826.
- Reports. Vol. 6. London: Joseph Butterworth. 1826.
- Reports. Vol. Analytical index. London: Joseph Butterworth. 1827.

Legal offices
| Preceded by Sir Thomas Fleming | Lord Chief Justice; 1613–1616 | Succeeded by Henry Montagu |
| Preceded by Sir Francis Gawdy | Chief Justice of the Common Pleas; 1606–1613 | Succeeded by Sir Henry Hobart |
Political offices
| Preceded by Thomas Snagge | Speaker of the House of Commons; 1592–1593 | Succeeded by Sir Christopher Yelverton |
