= Easton Maudit =

Village in Northamptonshire, England

Coordinates: 52.2193°N 0.6992°W

- Location within Northamptonshire
- Population: 88 (2001)
- OS grid reference: SP888587
- Unitary authority: North Northamptonshire
- Ceremonial county: Northamptonshire
- Region: East Midlands
- Country: England
- Sovereign state: United Kingdom
- Post town: Wellingborough
- Postcode district: NN29
- Dialling code: 01933
- Police: Northamptonshire
- Fire: Northamptonshire
- Ambulance: East Midlands
- UK Parliament: Wellingborough

Easton Maudit is a small village and civil parish in rural Northamptonshire. It takes its name from the Maudit (or Mauduit) family who purchased the estate at what was then just Easton, in 1131. There was no residential landowner in the village until 1578 when the village was acquired by Sir Christopher Yelverton. It is about 8 miles (13 km) east of Northampton town centre. At the 2011 census the population remained less than 100 and is included in the civil parish of Bozeat.

Thomas Percy was made the rector of the parish at the age of 24; he was a friend of Samuel Johnson, who was a frequent visitor to the Rectory.

== History ==
=== Church ===
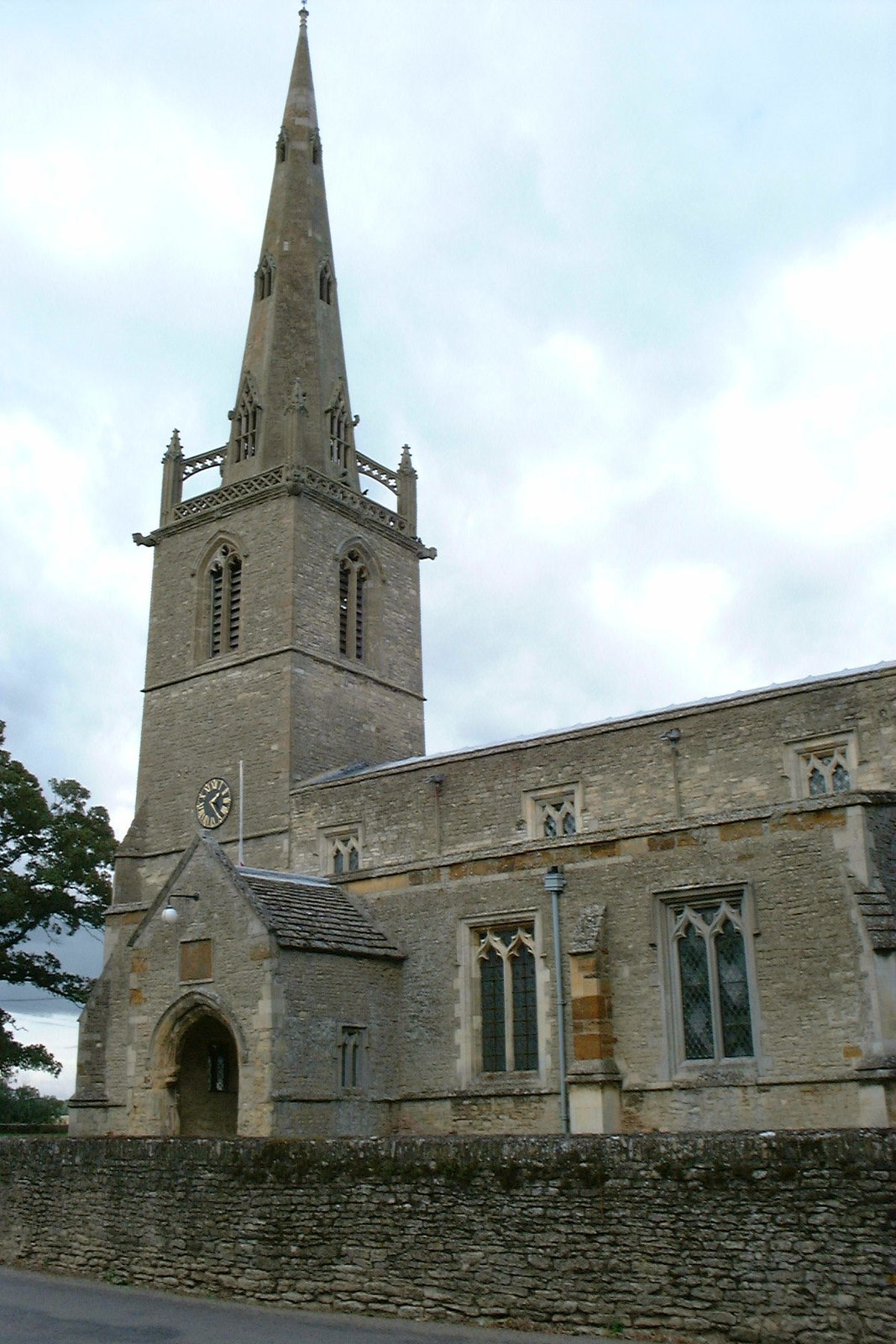

The church is dedicated to St Peter and St Paul.

The church floor was designed by Lord Alwyne Compton, Bishop of Ely, and includes the motto of the Marquesses of Northampton.

Samuel Johnson, Oliver Goldsmith, David Garrick and other members of the Garrick Club, were friends of the then rector and as well as staying in the village worshipped in the church. The chief monument is to Sir Christopher Yelverton, a Speaker of the House of Commons, who composed the prayer which is still said daily in Parliament. Yelverton's son Henry was Attorney-General to James I.

Outside the churchyard are the remains of a large oak tree - the shell of which is now artificially supported. The village and church feature in "The Hammer of God", the first episode of the 1974 Father Brown television series, starring Kenneth More.

=== Manor house ===
The village once housed a manor house. The house was purchased by the Compton family from Castle Ashby and they had the house demolished. All that now remains is the plot of the house surrounded by Lebanon Cedars.

=== World War II ===
German intelligence officer Hans Reysen parachuted in early October 1940, from a group under Theodor Rowehl. He had been born on 12 June 1911 in Berlin, studying Geology and Mining in Berlin, and at the University of California from 1936.

He stayed in buildings on Grendon Road at Yardley Hastings, but was caught around 6.50pm on October 4 1940, and taken to Percy Keggin. Reysen was briskly walked with the head of the Easton Maudit Home Guard, 41-year-old Walter Reginald Penn, to the police officer in Bozeat, John William Forth around 7.30pm. Mr Forth's wife made Mr Reysen a meal of scrambled eggs, and noticed how nervous that he was, but was polite in the way that he thanked her for the food. The Home Guard had detected a foreign accent, and how new and foreign that Reysen's clothes were. Mr Forth telephoned Wellingborough police, and Inspector Sharman drove to Bozeat at 8pm. Up until this moment, Reysen had been spoken to in a mostly convivial manner, but the police inspector was not intending to be anything like as friendly. Sharman searched Reysen, and found a gun and intelligence documents. Heysen said that he had parachuted to transmit 'weather information' back to Germany. Heysen had trained in the Lehr Infantry Regiment, an intelligence and sabotage unit. Later, when questioned in London, he narrowly escaped execution. For the rest of the war, he lived at Camp 020R.

== Notable resident ==
The actor Derek Nimmo lived in Easton Maudit and is buried in the village graveyard.

== Other village pictures ==
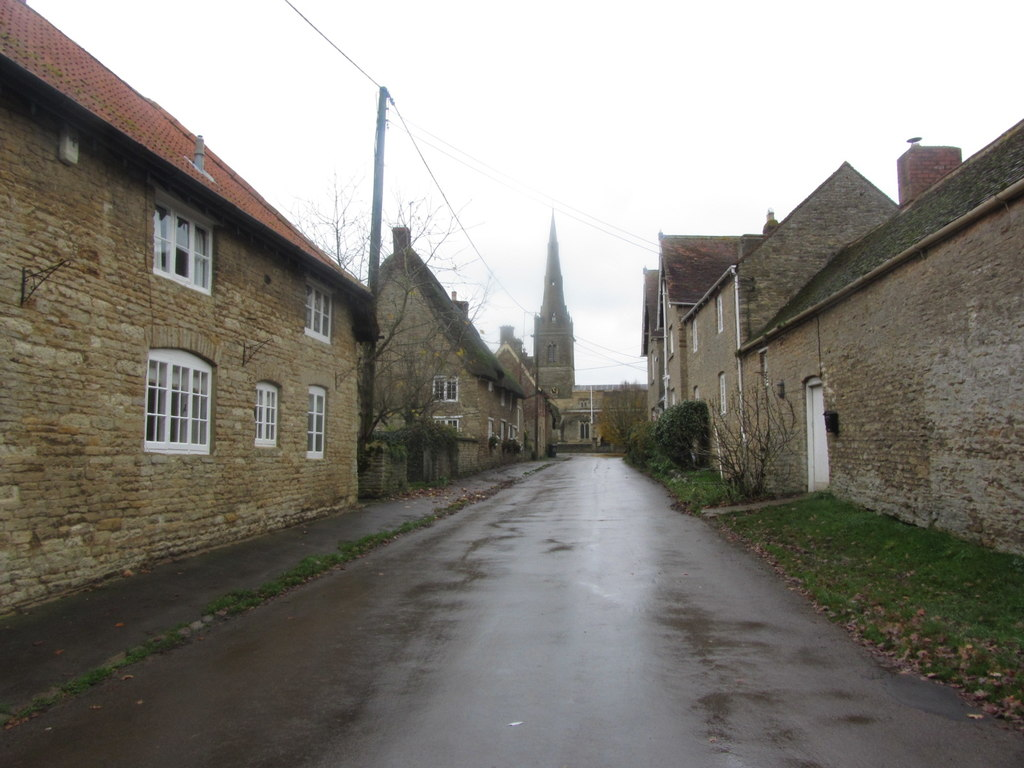

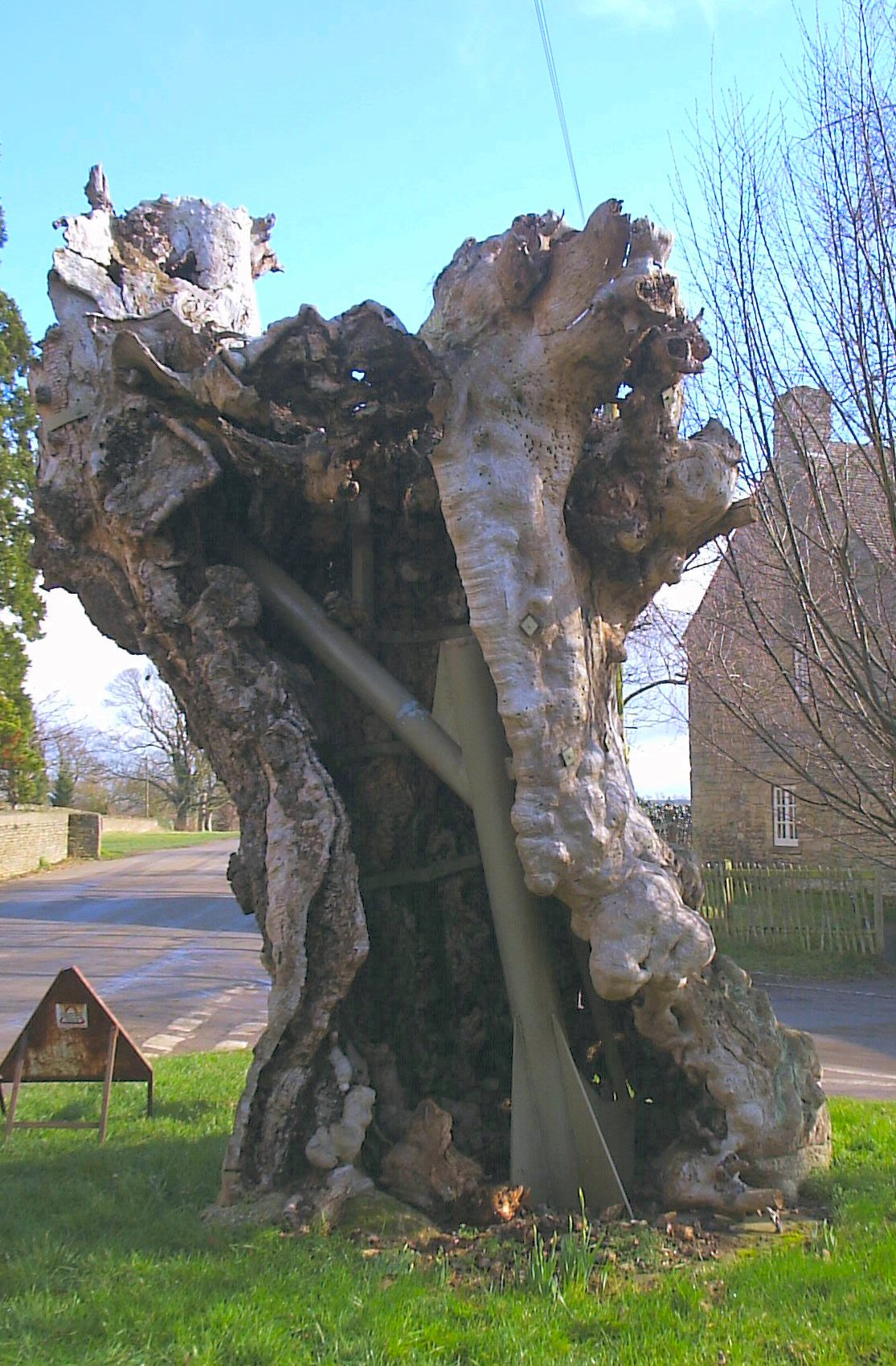
Remains of the Great Tree

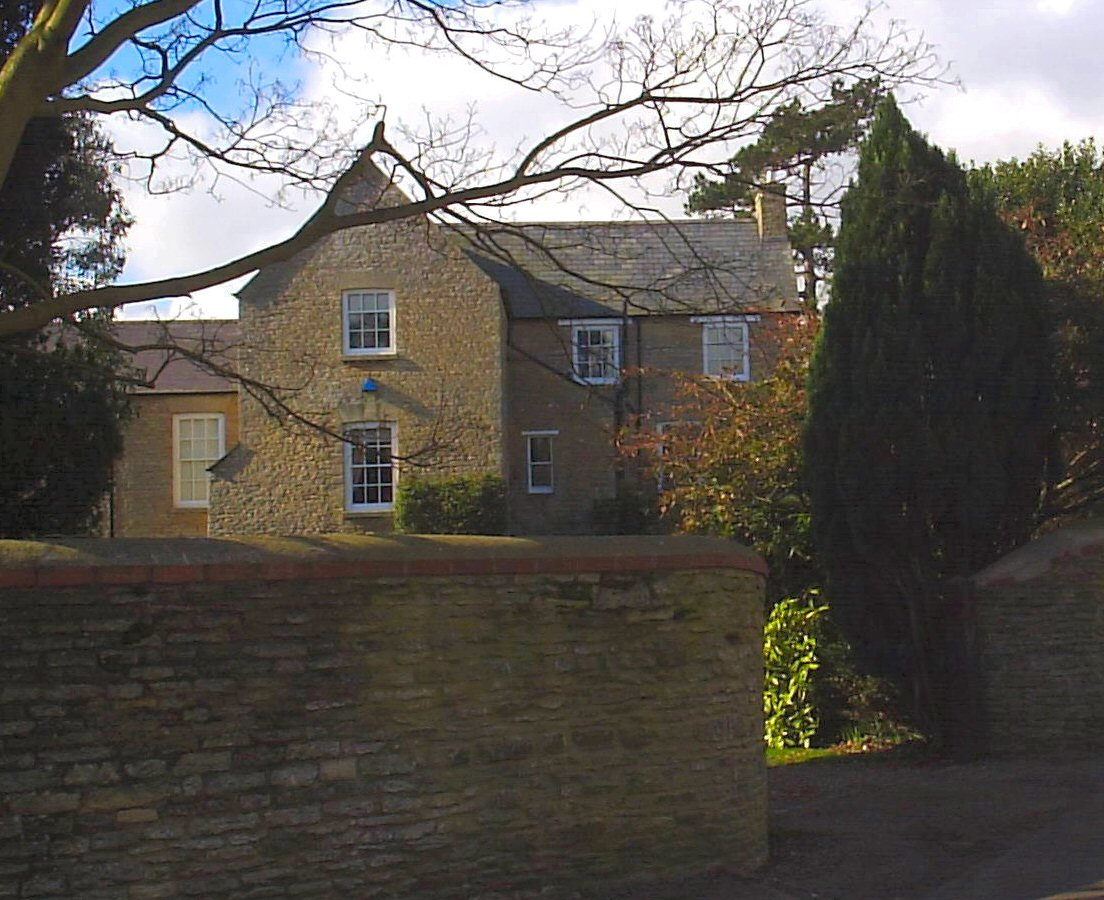
The Old Vicarage

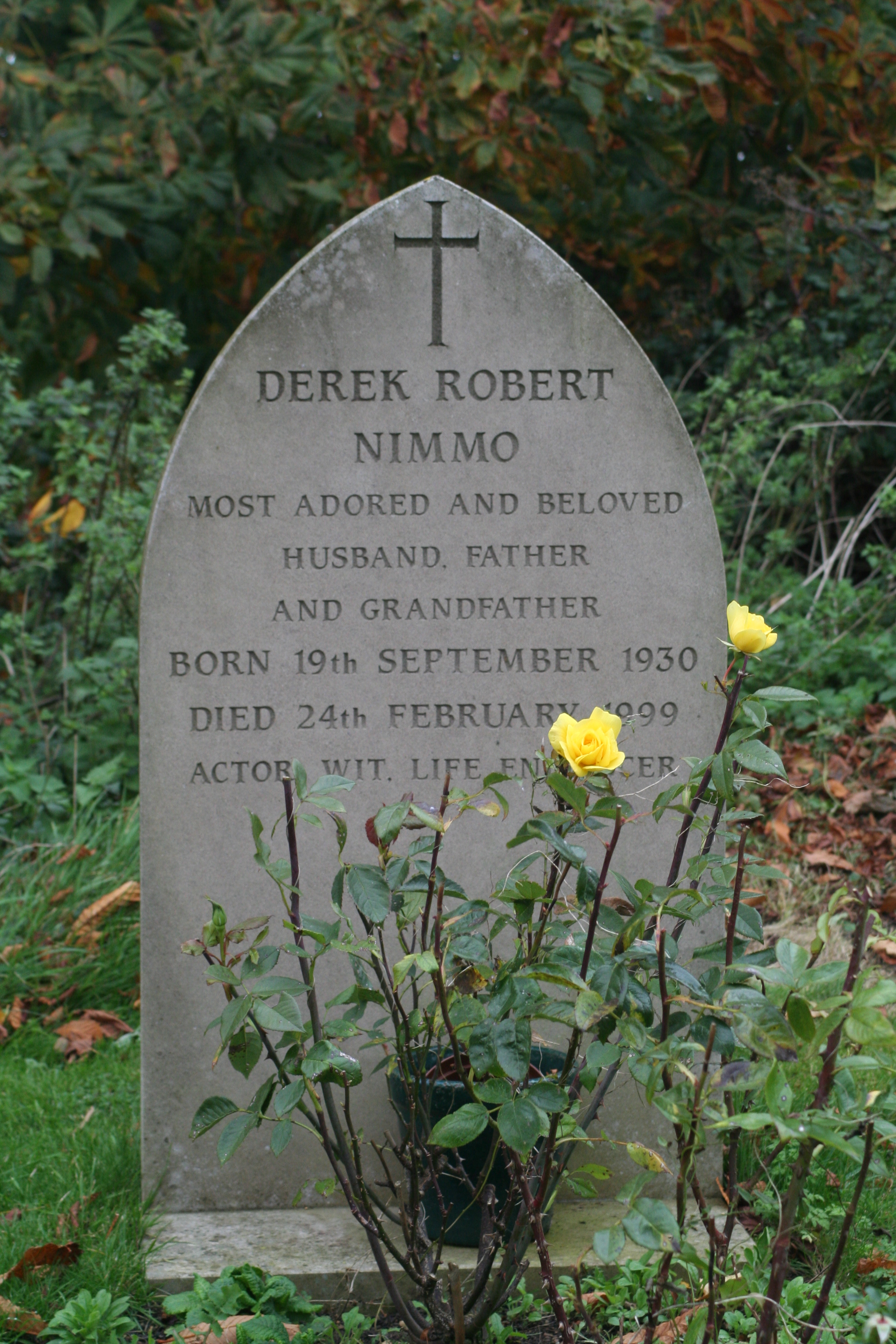
Derek Nimmo's grave

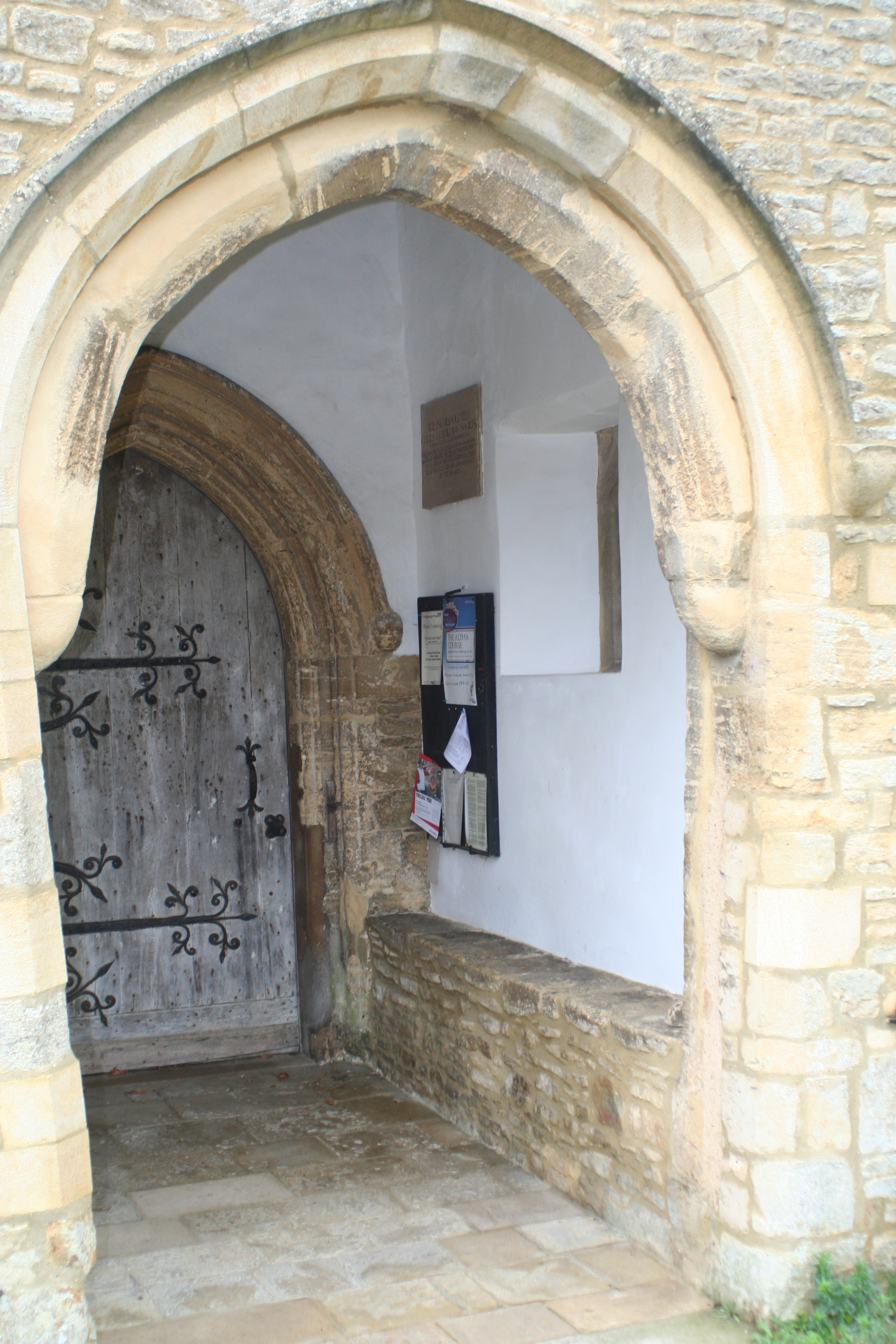
The old porch to the church

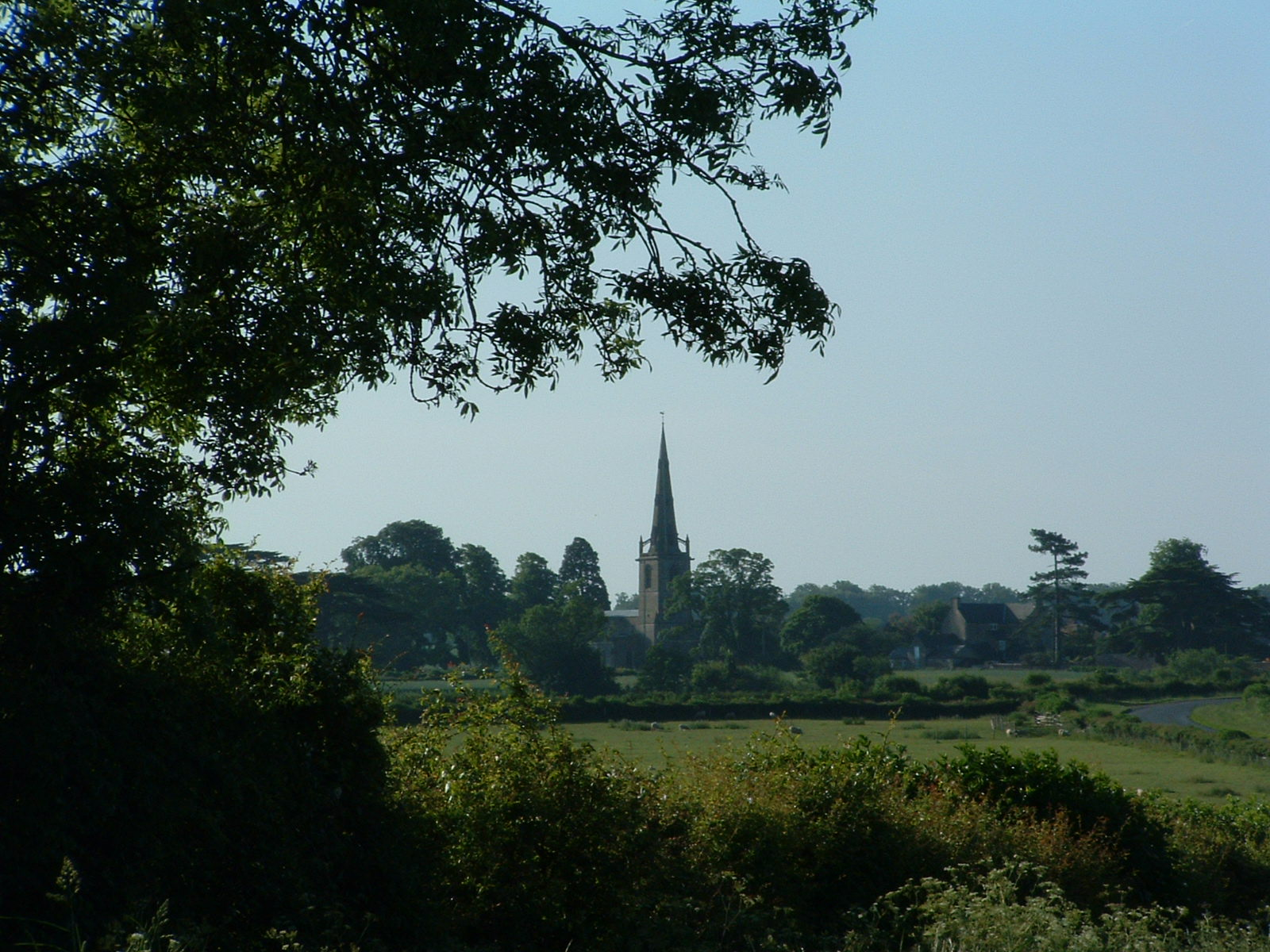
The village seen from Grendon
