= Edmund Peacham =

English clergyman and traitor

- Died: 1616; Taunton, England
- Occupation: Clergyman

Edmund Peacham, or Edmond Peacham, (died 1616) was an English clergyman and traitor. He was found guilty of treason based on an unpublished treatise he wrote that advocated for rebellion against the English crown; he was tortured and executed by the government.

== Biography ==
Peacham was instituted to the rectory of Hinton St. George, Somerset, on 15 July 1587. The patron was Sir Amias Paulet. Peacham adopted puritan opinions in early life, and sympathised with the popular party in politics. In 1603 he was accused, without, apparently, any serious result, of 'uttering in a sermon seditious and railing words against the king, and more especially against his counsellors, the bishops and judges' (Cal. State Papers, Dom. 1603-10, p. 26). The development of James I's policy in both church and state stirred in him a deep disgust, of which he made no concealment in the pulpit. James Montagu, who in 1608 became his diocesan, found it necessary to mark his resentment of Peacham's plainness of speech, and reprimanded him in his consistory court. Peacham retaliated by writing a book against that court for private circulation in manuscript, and either there or in conversation he brought grave charges against his bishop's character. Before the parliament of 1614 was dissolved he came to London, apparently to arrange for the presentation of a petition against one Dr. James and other officials of the ecclesiastical courts in the diocese of Bath and Wells. When, later in the year, he was asked to subscribe to the benevolence demanded by the king, he is said to have answered, with St. Peter, 'gold and silver he had none, but that he had he would give, which was his prayers for the king.'

In December 1614, Peacham was arrested on Montagu's complaint by order of the court of high commission. He was brought to London, and was detained in the Gatehouse. On 9 December he was transferred to the Tower of London. Ten days later he was brought to trial before the high commission court at Lambeth on a charge of libelling Montagu. He was found guilty, and was deprived of his orders.

Additional serious accusations were soon brought against him. While his house was being searched for his writings against Montagu, the officers discovered some carefully prepared notes of a sermon in which the king and the government were denounced with reckless vehemence. Not only were James's ministers charged with misconduct, the king with extravagance, and the ecclesiastical courts with a tyrannical exercise of their powers, but the king's sudden death and a rebellion of the people were declared to be the probable outcome of the government's alleged misdeeds. The council treated Peacham's words as of treasonable intent. He was at examined, but offered no defence, and declined all explanation. His defiant attitude suggested to the ministers' minds that he was implicated in some conspiracy in his neighbourhood. The Somerset gentry had shown exceptional unwillingness to contribute to the benevolence of 1614, and Peacham was known to be in friendly relations with many of them. The king, who bitterly resented Peacham's remarks on himself, urged the government to test their suspicions to the uttermost. But it was needful to obtain fuller information from the silent prisoner. Although the common law did not recognise the legality of torturing a prisoner to extort a confession, it was generally admitted that torture might be lawfully applied by the privy council to a prisoner who deliberately refused to surrender information in his possession respecting a plot against the life of the sovereign or the security of the government. Francis Bacon, who was attorney-general, laid it down as a legal maxim that 'in the highest cases of treason torture is used for discovery and not for evidence' (Spedding, iii. 114)—that is to say, torture might be used to extract from a suspected conspirator information respecting the conspiracy and his fellow-plotters, although not to obtain evidence to be employed against himself. Accordingly the king issued a warrant on 18 January 1615 to two privy councillors (Ralph Winwood and Sir Julius Cæsar), the attorney-general Bacon, Serjeant Henry Montagu, brother of the bishop of Bath and Wells, and the officers of the Tower to 'put Peacham to the manacles as in your discretion you shall see occasion if you find him obstinate and perverse, and not otherwise willing or ready to tell the truth.' Next day the torture was applied in the presence of the persons named, and he was examined 'before torture, in torture, between tortures, and after torture.' But 'nothing could be drawn from him.' He still persisted 'in his obstinate and insensible denials and former answers.' Peacham is described as an old man at the time, and the inhumanity of the proceedings was revolting.

On 21 January 1615 Bacon wrote to James that he was 'exceedingly grieved that your majesty should be so much troubled with this matter of Peacham, whose raging devil seemeth to be turned into a dumb devil.' The council, to satisfy the king's wishes, determined to bring the prisoner to trial on a charge of high treason; but doubt was entertained whether the offence was legally entitled to that description. Bacon undertook to consult the judges separately on the point before the indictment was drawn up. The king approved the suggestion. Bacon was confident that by private persuasion he could obtain from the bench a unanimous decision in favour of the council's contention. His anticipations were realised except in the case of Coke, who protested against 'such particular and auricular taking of opinions,' and further asserted that unless a written attack on the king 'disabled his title' no charge of treason could be based upon it. The arrangements for Peacham's trial were not interrupted by Coke's want of compliance; but Peacham, perceiving that his trial meant his death, resorted to desperately dishonest expedients in order to interpose delay. He declared that Sir John Sydenham, brother-in-law of Paulet, the patron of his living, had suggested to him the objectionable words. Sydenham and Paulet were summoned before the council, and Peacham was re-examined; although Peacham continued to give mysterious hints that he was abetted by persons of influence, no evidence on the point was adduced, and Peacham fell back on a denial of the authorship of the incriminating papers (10 March 1615). They were by a namesake, 'a divine, a scholar, and a traveller,' who dwelt 'sometimes at Hounslow as a minister,' who had visited Hinton St. George, and had left some manuscripts in the rectory study. Peacham was apparently referring at random to the contemporary writer, Henry Peacham.

In July, Peacham was sent to Taunton to stand his trial. On 7 August 1615 he was arraigned at the assizes before Sir Christopher Tanfield and Serjeant Montagu. Sir Randal Crewe, the king's Serjeant, and Sir Henry Yelverton, solicitor-general, came from London to conduct the case (Yonge, Diary, Camd. Soc.) 'Seven knights were taken from the bench to be of the jury.' Peacham defended himself 'very simply, but obstinately and doggedly enough.' He was, however, found guilty and condemned to death. No efforts seem to have been made to carry out the sentence. On 31 August he was examined anew, and, while admitting that he wrote the sermon, declared that he had no intention of publishing or preaching it. For seven months he lingered in the jail at Taunton. On 27 March 1616 Chamberlain wrote to Carleton: 'Peacham, the condemned minister, is dead in the jail at Taunton, where, they say, he left behind him a most wicked and desperate writing, worse than that he was convicted for.'

Peacham's persecution would not have given him posthumous fame had not James I and Bacon by their zealous efforts to obtain his conviction raised legal controversies of high constitutional importance.
