= Charles Montagu, 1st Duke of Manchester =

British peer and politician (c. 1662–1722)

His Grace The Duke of Manchester PC
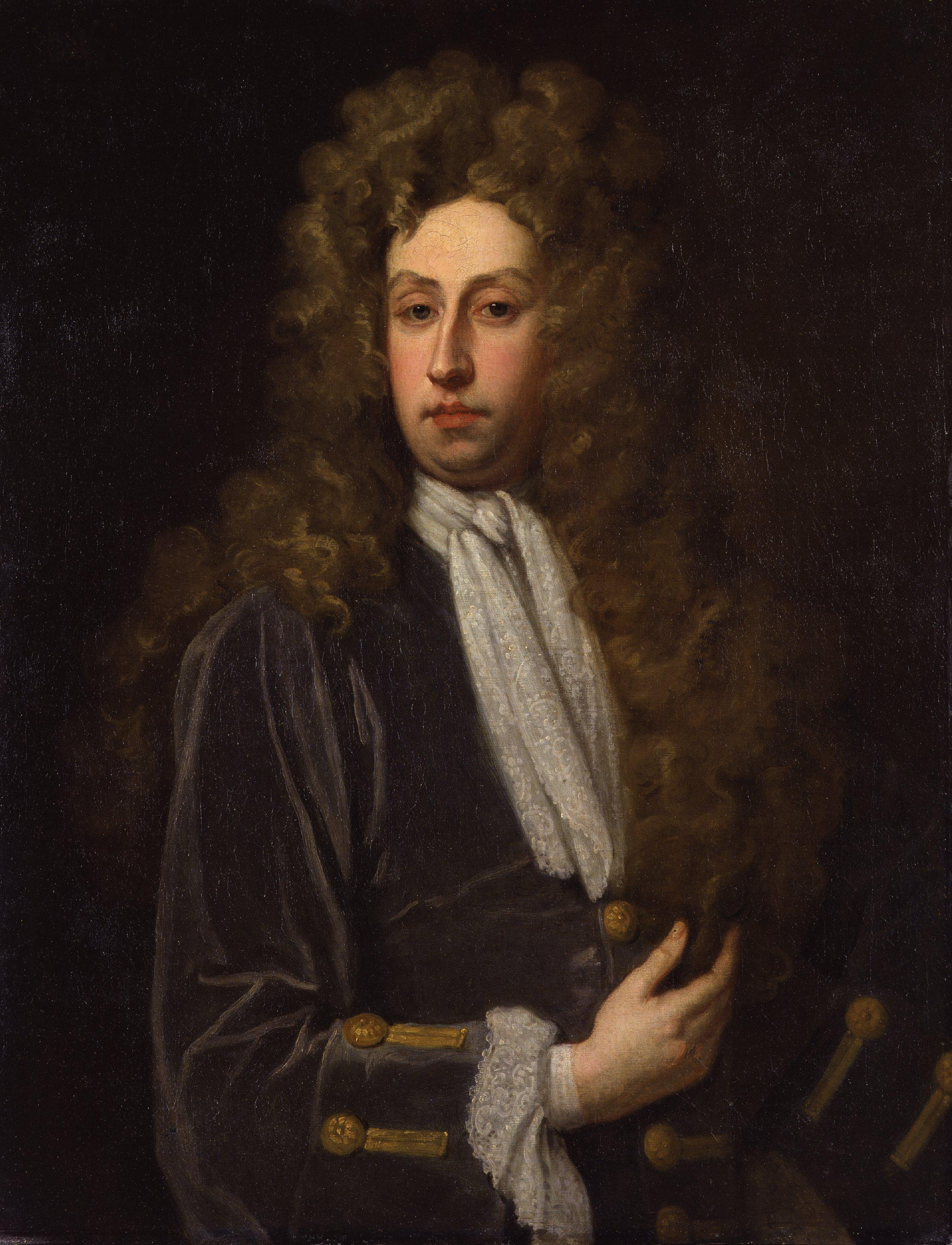
- Portrait of Lord Manchester by Godfrey Kneller, c. 1711

British Ambassador to Venice
- In office 1707–1708
- Monarch: Anne
- Preceded by: Sir Lambert Blackwell (Acting)
- Succeeded by: Christian Cole (Acting)

English Ambassador to France
- In office 1699–1701
- Monarch: William III
- Preceded by: The Earl of Jersey
- Succeeded by: The Duke of Hamilton

Personal details
- Born: Charles Edward Montagu c. 1662
- Died: 20 January 1722 (aged 59–60)
- Spouse: Doddington Greville (m. 1690; died 1720)
- Children: 4
- Parent(s): Robert Montagu, 3rd Earl of Manchester; Anne Yelverton
- Relatives: Robert Montagu (brother); Heneage Montagu (brother)
- Education: Trinity College, Cambridge

Charles Edward Montagu, 1st Duke of Manchester, PC (previously 4th Earl of Manchester) (c. 1662 – 20 January 1722) was a British aristocrat and statesman.

== Early life ==
Charles was born c. 1662 into the Noble House of Montagu. He was the eldest son of the former Anne Yelverton and Robert Montagu, 3rd Earl of Manchester. Among his siblings were Lady Anne Montagu (wife of James Howard, 3rd Earl of Suffolk) and politicians the Hon. Robert Montagu and the Hon. Heneage Montagu, both MPs for Huntingdonshire. After his father's death in 1683, his mother married Charles Montagu, 1st Earl of Halifax.

His paternal grandparents were Edward Montagu, 2nd Earl of Manchester and his second wife Lady Anne Rich (a daughter of Robert Rich, 2nd Earl of Warwick). His maternal grandparents were Sir Christopher Yelverton, 1st Baronet of Easton Maudit and Anne Twysden (daughter of Sir William Twysden, 1st Baronet).

He was educated at Trinity College, Cambridge, and succeeded to his father's earldom in 1683. Warmly sympathizing with the Whig revolution of 1688, he attended William and Mary at their coronation, and fought under William at the Boyne.

== Career ==
In 1697, he was sent as an Envoy to Venice to try to procure the release of British sailors, but the Venetians proved unwilling to negotiate. On his return in 1698, he was appointed a privy councillor. The following year he was sent as English Ambassador to France, remaining there until the outbreak of war in 1701. He was then briefly appointed Secretary of State for the Southern Department, a post he held between January and May 1702. He was then out of office until again sent to Venice, as Ambassador, but during his time there in 1707 and 1708, this negotiations (to persuade Venice to adhere to the Grand Alliance) were again unsuccessful.

In 1714, he received an appointment in the household of George I, by whom on 28 April 1719 he was created Duke of Manchester.

In 1719, he was one of the main subscribers to the Royal Academy of Music, a corporation that produced baroque opera on the stage. He also served as High Steward of the University of Cambridge from 1697 to 1722.

== Personal life ==
On 19 February 1690, Lord Manchester married the Hon. Doddington Greville (1671–1720). She was a daughter of Robert Greville, 4th Baron Brooke of Beauchamps Court and Anne (née Doddington) Greville (who married Thomas Hoby after the death of Lord Brooke in 1676). Together, they were the parents of:

- Lady Doddington Montagu (c. 1694–1774), who died unmarried.
- William Montagu, 2nd Duke of Manchester (1700–1739), who married Lady Isabella Montagu, a daughter of John Montagu, 2nd Duke of Montagu and Lady Mary Churchill (the youngest surviving daughter of John Churchill, 1st Duke of Marlborough).
- Lady Charlotte Montagu (1705–1759), who married Pattee Byng, 2nd Viscount Torrington, the eldest son of George Byng, 1st Viscount Torrington.
- Robert Montagu, 3rd Duke of Manchester (c. 1710–1762), who married Harriet Dunch, daughter and co-heiress of Edmund Dunch.

He died on 20 January 1722.

== Ancestry ==
Ancestors of Charles Montagu, 1st Duke of Manchester

8. Henry Montagu, 1st Earl of Manchester
4. Edward Montagu, 2nd Earl of Manchester
9. Catherine Spencer
2. Robert Montagu, 3rd Earl of Manchester
10. Robert Rich, 2nd Earl of Warwick
5. Lady Anne Rich
11. Frances Hatton
1. Charles Montagu, 1st Duke of Manchester
12. Henry Yelverton
6. Sir Christopher Yelverton, 1st Baronet of Easton Maudit
13. Mary Beale
3. Anne Yelverton
14. Sir William Twysden, 1st Baronet of Roydon Hall
7. Anne Twysden
15. Lady Anne Finch

Political offices
Preceded by The Viscount Grandison	Captain of the Yeomen of the Guard; 1670–1702	Succeeded by Marquess of Hartington
Preceded by James Vernon	Secretary of State for the Southern Department; 1702	Succeeded by The Earl of Nottingham
Diplomatic posts
Preceded by	British Envoy to Venice; 1697–1698	Succeeded by
Preceded by The Earl of Jersey	English Ambassador to France; 1699–1701	Vacant War of Spanish Succession Title next held by The Duke of Hamilton
Preceded by	British Ambassador to Venice; 1707–1708	Succeeded by
Honorary titles
Preceded by The Earl of Ailesbury	Lord Lieutenant of Huntingdonshire; 1689–1722	Succeeded by Viscount Hinchingbrooke
Peerage of England
Preceded by Robert Montagu	Earl of Manchester; 1683–1722	Succeeded by William Montagu
Peerage of Great Britain
New title	Duke of Manchester; 1719–1722	Succeeded by William Montagu
