= Huntingdonshire Rifles =

Auxiliary unit of the British Army

Huntingdonshire Militia Huntingdonshire Rifles 5th (Reserve) Bn, King's Royal Rifle Corps
- Active: 1558–April 1953
- Country: England (1558–1707); Kingdom of Great Britain (1707–1800); United Kingdom (1801–1953)
- Branch: Militia/Special Reserve
- Role: Infantry
- Size: 1 Battalion
- Part of: King's Royal Rifle Corps
- Garrison/HQ: Huntingdon

The Huntingdonshire Militia, (Note: There is no consistency in the sources as to whether the regiment was the 'Huntingdon' or 'Huntingdonshire' Militia.) later the Huntingdonshire Rifles, was an auxiliary military force in the county of Huntingdonshire in the East Midlands of England. From their formal organisation as Trained Bands in 1558 the Militia of Huntingdonshire served during times of international tension and Britain's major wars. They provided internal security and home defence, relieving regular troops from routine garrison duties, and acting as a source of trained officers and men for the Regular Army. The regiment later became a battalion of the King's Royal Rifle Corps, and trained thousands of reservists and recruits during World War I. It maintained a shadowy existence until final disbandment in 1953.

== Early history ==
The English militia was descended from the Anglo-Saxon Fyrd, the military force raised from the freemen of the shires under command of their Sheriff. It continued under the Norman kings, notably at the Battle of the Standard (1138). The force was reorganised under the Assizes of Arms of 1181 and 1252, and again by King Edward I's Statute of Winchester of 1285. The main threats were from Scotland, Wales or France: as an inland county Huntingdonshire avoided most of the demands.

== Huntingdonshire Trained Bands ==
The legal basis of the militia was updated by two Acts of 1557 covering musters and the maintenance of horses and armour. The county militia was now under the Lord Lieutenant, assisted by the Deputy Lieutenants and Justices of the Peace (JPs). The entry into force of these Acts in 1558 is seen as the starting date for the organised county militia in England. Several of the southern counties were called upon to send troops to suppress the Rising of the North in 1569. Although the militia obligation was universal, this assembly confirmed that it was impractical to train and equip every able-bodied man. After 1572 the practice was to select a proportion of men for the Trained Bands (TBs). They were trained by professional captains and muster-masters for up to 10 days each year. Full musters were held about every three years when the arms and armour were inspected. In 1584 Huntingdonshire was charged with supplying 200 'shot' (men with firearms), 100 bowmen and 100 'corslets' (body armour signifying pikemen).

The threat of invasion during the Spanish War led to an increase in training. At first the government emphasised the 17 'maritime' counties most vulnerable to attack, and it was not until 1586 that the inland counties were placed under lords-lieutenant (Lord St John of Bletso was appointed to Huntingdonshire in April 1588), ordered to appoint captains and muster-master corporals and to intensify training. The TBs were placed on alert in April 1588 and brought to an hour's notice in June. When warning of the invasion Armada arrived the TBs were mobilised on 23 July. The 400 Huntingdonshire TB foot joined Lord Hunsdon's army defending the queen and were formed with the Worcestershire, Leicestershire and Warwickshire TBs into Sir Henry Goodere's Regiment, 2100 strong. The county also provided 19 lancers and 65 light horse. The army gathered at Tilbury was broken up shortly after Queen Elizabeth gave her Tilbury speech on 9 August, the danger having passed.

In the 16th Century little distinction was made between the militia and the troops levied by the counties for overseas expeditions, and between 1585 and 1601 Huntingdonshire supplied 398 levies for service in Ireland, 150 for France and 50 for the Netherlands. However, the counties usually conscripted the unemployed and criminals rather than the Trained Bandsmen – in 1585 the Privy Council had ordered the impressment of able-bodied unemployed men, and the queen ordered 'none of her trayned-bands to be pressed'. Replacing the weapons issued to the levies from the militia armouries was a heavy burden on the counties.

With the passing of the threat of invasion, the trained bands declined in the early 17th Century. Later, King Charles I attempted to reform them into a national force or 'Perfect Militia' answering to the king rather than local control. In 1638 the Huntingdon TBs consisted of a foot regiment of 240 musketeers and 160 corslets, and a Troop of 20 lancers and 30 light horse.

=== Civil Wars ===
In 1639 and 1640 Charles attempted to employ the TBs for the Bishops' Wars in Scotland. However, many of those sent on this unpopular service were untrained replacements and conscripts, and many officers were corrupt or inefficient. In March 1640 the 400 men of the Huntingdon TB were ordered to be shipped to Newcastle upon Tyne for service against the Scots. They were to be at the general rendezvous by 25 May to march to Great Yarmouth on 5 June, to be ready to sail on 10 June. Once again, it seems that many of the trained bandsmen nationwide escaped service and raw substitutes were sent in their place

Control of the TBs was one of the major points of dispute between Charles I and Parliament that led to the First English Civil War. However, once open warfare had broken out neither side made much use of the TBs beyond securing the county armouries for their own full-time troops who would serve anywhere in the country, many of whom were former trained bandsmen (probably in the Earl of Manchester's Eastern Association army in the case of men from Huntingdonshire).

As Parliament tightened its grip on the country after the Second English Civil War, it passed new Militia Acts in 1648 and 1650 that replaced lords lieutenant with county commissioners appointed by Parliament or the Council of State. From now on, the term 'Trained Band' began to disappear in most counties. Under the Commonwealth and Protectorate, the militia received pay when called out, and operated alongside the New Model Army to control the country. During the campaign of 1651, the Huntingdonshire Militia were ordered to rendezvous at Northampton, but took no part in the Battle of Worcester, probably remaining in reserve at Coventry.

== Restoration Militia ==
After the Restoration of the Monarchy the English Militia was re-established by the Militia Act 1661 under the control of the king's lords lieutenant, the men to be selected by ballot. This was popularly seen as the 'Constitutional Force' to counterbalance a 'Standing Army' tainted by association with the New Model Army that had supported Oliver Cromwell's military dictatorship, and almost the whole burden of home defence and internal security was entrusted to the militia.

There was a general muster of the militia in 1685 after the Duke of Monmouth landed at Lyme Regis on 11 June, launching the Monmouth Rebellion against King James II. The West Country militia were engaged, including at the Battle of Sedgemoor, but James deliberately belittled their performance to bolster plans for a large army under his own control. After the suppression of the rebellion he suspended militia musters and planned to use the counties' weapons and militia taxes to equip and pay his expanding Regular Army, which he felt he could rely upon, unlike the locally commanded militia. When William of Orange landed in the West Country in 1688 and marched against James, the militia did not stir against him in the 'Glorious Revolution'.

The militia continued their defence role under William. In 1697 the counties were required to submit detailed lists of their militia. Under the 4th Earl of Manchester as lord-lieutenant, Huntingdonshire mustered a regiment of 390 foot in five companies commanded by Colonel Robert Apreece, and a 72-strong troop of horse under Capt Heneage Montagu, the earl's younger brother. The militia continued mustering for annual training until the Treaty of Utrecht and the accession of King George I, but after the Jacobite Rising of 1715 they passed into virtual abeyance.

== 1757 Reforms ==
Under threat of French invasion during the Seven Years' War a series of Militia Acts from 1757 reorganised the county militia regiments, the men being conscripted by means of parish ballots (paid substitutes were permitted) to serve for three years. In peacetime they assembled for 28 days' annual training. There was a property qualification for officers, who were commissioned by the lord lieutenant. An adjutant and drill sergeants were to be provided to each regiment from the Regular Army, and arms and accoutrements would be supplied when the county had secured 60 per cent of its quota of recruits.

The legislation was unpopular, and there were anti-militia riots in Huntingdonshire in 1757, 1759 and again in 1761. The county was given a quota of 320 men to be raised, and as a small county, the property qualification for militia officers in Huntingdonshire was lowered in order to find enough of them. The issue of its weapons was authorised on 23 August 1759, and it was embodied for permanent service on 22 October the same year. Although the regiment had fewer than eight companies it was allowed the full establishment of field officers (colonel, lieutenant-colonel and major) because the Lord Lieutenant (the 3rd Duke of Manchester) served as colonel himself.

The militia were disembodied in 1762 as the war was coming to an end, and continued with their annual training thereafter.

=== American War of Independence ===
The militia was embodied in March 1778 during the War of American Independence when the country was threatened with invasion by the Americans' allies, France and Spain. Huntingdonshire was commended for the rapidity with which its new men were trained. That year the regiment was stationed at Portsmouth, where together with the Buckinghamshires they were put to constructing fortifications. The officers of the two regiments complained that this work was demeaning for a citizen force intended for use only in emergencies. However, militiamen engaged in skilled work were paid extra, and the real objection seems to have been the additional work for the officers.

In the summer of 1779 the Huntingdons were on coast defence in Northumberland. It is reported that in August a detachment at Alnwick heard the sound of guns and were told that there were French frigates off the coast at nearby Alnmouth. The detachment reached the threatened spot just over two hours after the first alarm, having sent word to their commanding officer (Capt Thomas Apreece) who soon had the whole regiment on the march. It turned out that two frigates had attacked a British whaler off the coast, but had sailed away when others came up. The local commander, Lord Adam Gordon thought the whole affair a silly alarm.

In the summer of 1780 the Huntingdons were in camp at Tiptree Heath in Essex, with two regular and six other militia regiments. In September Capt Apreece in temporary command of the regiment absented himself from the camp because of his wife's illness, then prolonged his absence with spurious excuses. Lieutenant-General George Lane Parker, in command, considered that Apreece deserved to be court-martialed, but he was simply kept in arrest for some time and his behaviour reported to the Commander-in-Chief.

In November 1781 the Huntingdons were quartered for the winter in King's Lynn, where the authorities wanted one of the four companies to be removed from the town because of the shortage of billets.

Hostilities ended with the Treaty of Paris and the militia could be stood down. From 1784 to 1792 they were kept up to strength by the ballot and were supposed to assemble for 28 days' training annually, even though to save money only two-thirds of the men were actually called out each year.

=== French Revolutionary War ===
The militia had already been embodied in December 1792 before Revolutionary France declared war on Britain on 1 February 1793. The 5th Duke of Manchester was appointed colonel of the Huntingdonshire Militia on 8 May. The French Revolutionary Wars saw a new phase for the English militia: they were embodied for a whole generation, and became regiments of full-time professional soldiers (though restricted to service in the British Isles), which the regular army increasingly saw as a prime source of recruits. They served in coast defences, manned garrisons, guarded prisoners of war, and carried out internal security duties, while their traditional local defence duties were taken over by the Volunteers and mounted Yeomanry.

In the summer of 1793 the Huntingdons were camped at Warley in Essex, with the Cambridgeshires as their neighbours. There was resentment among the Cambridgeshires that they had to keep strict order in the evenings and retire to their tents at 20.00 or 21.00, while the Huntingdons were under no such restrictions. There was a riot, which was only suppressed with difficulty.

Late in 1795 the Huntingdons were at Yarmouth Barracks with the South Lincolnshire Militia. The whole force was under the command of the strict colonel of the South Lincolns, who imposed a curfew because of trouble caused by the militiamen in town. The Huntingdons rioted and devastated their quarters. For a time it looked as if they might have to be put down by force, but in the end they were sent away and replaced by the Cambridgeshires, who complained bitterly about having to move into the barracks wrecked by the Huntingdon 'banditti'. The Huntingdons' version was that they had been corrupted by the South Lincolns.

In an attempt to have as many men as possible under arms for home defence in order to release regulars, the Government created the Supplementary Militia in 1796, a compulsory levy of men to be trained in their spare time, and to be incorporated in the Militia in emergency, but uniquely Huntingdonshire was given no additional quota to raise. Indeed, after the supplementaries had been stood down and surplus militiamen encouraged to transfer to the Regular Army, the county's normal militia quota was reduced to just 159 men when the Treaty of Amiens was signed and the militia disembodied in 1802.

=== Napoleonic Wars ===
The Peace of Amiens proving short-lived, the militia were re-embodied in March 1803 and resumed their normal duties. Increasingly, they were seen as a source of trained men for the Regulars and were encouraged to transfer, for a bounty, and the militia was replenished by use of the ballot and voluntary recruitment.

During the invasion crisis of 1805, while Napoleon assembled the 'Army of England' across the English Channel at Boulogne, the Huntingdonshire Militia (177 men under the senior captain, Henry Cipriani) was guarding the Royal Arsenal, Woolwich.

=== Huntingdonshire Local Militia ===
While the Regular Militia were the mainstay of national defence during the Napoleonic Wars, they were supplemented from 1808 by the Local Militia, which were part-time and only to be used within their own districts. These were raised to counter the declining numbers of Volunteers, and if their ranks could not be filled voluntarily the militia ballot was employed. They were to be trained once a year.

Huntingdonshire was to raise a single battalion. On 24 September the vice- and deputy-lieutenants (the Lord Lieutenant, the Duke of Manchester, being absent as Governor of Jamaica) commissioned Viscount Hinchinbrooke and John Heathcote to be Lt-Col Commandant and Lt-Col respectively: they had been Colonel and Lt-Col of the former Huntingdon Volunteers. Most of the other officers had also transferred from the volunteers.

All the militia regiments were disembodied by the end of 1816, following Napoleon's final defeat at the Battle of Waterloo, and the Local Militia was disbanded.

=== Long Peace ===
After Waterloo there was another long peace. Although ballots were still held, the regular militia regiments were rarely assembled for training and their permanent staffs of sergeants and drummers (who were occasionally used to maintain public order) were progressively reduced. Officers continued to be commissioned sporadically. The 5th Duke of Manchester resigned the colonelcy of the Huntingdonshire Militia in 1827, recommending Thomas Vaughan as his successor, commenting that Vaughan had effectively been the commanding officer since 1818. Vaughan, who had been a Regular officer in the French Revolutionary War and then served in the Yeomanry and the Peterborough Volunteers, was duly appointed, and remained major-commandant (with the personal rank of colonel) until 1852. The 6th Duke of Manchester, by then lord lieutenant, commissioned his younger son Lord Robert Montagu as captain in the regiment in 1846. By 1850 Vaughan, Montagu and one lieutenant commissioned as far back as 1808 were the only officers remaining apart from the former Regular adjutant and the surgeon.

== 1852 Reforms ==
The Militia of the United Kingdom was revived by the Militia Act 1852, enacted during a renewed period of international tension. As before, units were raised and administered on a county basis, and filled by voluntary enlistment (although conscription by means of the Militia Ballot might be used if the counties failed to meet their quotas). Training was for 56 days on enlistment, then for 21–28 days per year, during which the men received full army pay. The Militia was transferred from the Home Office to the War Office (WO). Under the Act, militia units could be embodied by Royal Proclamation for full-time home defence service in three circumstances:

1. 'Whenever a state of war exists between Her Majesty and any foreign power'.
2. 'In all cases of invasion or upon imminent danger thereof'.
3. 'In all cases of rebellion or insurrection'.

The Huntingdonshire Militia was reformed and was designated a rifle regiment in 1853. New younger officers, many of them ex-Regulars, were appointed to the revived regiments. In August 1852 the lord lieutenant, John Montagu, 7th Earl of Sandwich, became colonel of the Huntingdon Rifles and William Montagu, Viscount Mandeville (soon to be 7th Duke of Manchester) was appointed major; both had formerly been officers in the Grenadier Guards.

The Crimean War having broken out and a large expeditionary force sent overseas, most of the militia were called out for home defence in 1854–55, but the Huntingdonshire Rifles was not among them, nor was it embodied during the Indian Mutiny.

Over the following years the regiment was mustered each year for 21 or 28 days' training. Militia battalions now had a large cadre of permanent staff and a number of the officers were former Regulars. Around a third of the recruits and many young officers went on to join the Regular Army. The Militia Reserve introduced in 1867 consisted of present and former militiamen who undertook to serve overseas in case of war.

== Cardwell Reforms ==
Under the 'Localisation of the Forces' scheme introduced by the Cardwell Reforms of 1872, militia regiments were brigaded with their local Regular and Volunteer battalions. For the Huntingdon Rifles this was in Sub-District No 33 (Counties of Huntingdon, Bedford and Hertford):

- 1st and 2nd Bns 16th (Bedfordshire) Regiment of Foot
- Huntingdon Rifles at Huntingdon
- Bedfordshire Militia at Bedford
- Hertfordshire Militia at Hertford
- 1st Administrative Battalion, Bedfordshire Rifle Volunteer Corps] at Woburn
- 1st Administrative Battalion, Hertfordshire Rifle Volunteer Corps at Little Gaddesden
- 2nd Administrative Battalion, Hertfordshire Rifle Volunteer Corps at Hertford

(The only Huntingdonshire RVC at this time was a single company in the 1st Cambridgeshire Administrative Battalion.)

The Militia now came under the WO rather than their county lords lieutenant.

The Earl of Sandwich and the Duke of Manchester retained their positions into the regiment into the 1880s. The duke's son and heir, George Montagu, Viscount Mandeville, was commissioned into the regiment as a lieutenant when he was 18 years old. Frederick Rooper was promoted to major to replace the duke in 1880, but the Earl of Sandwich remained Honorary Colonel until his death in 1884. Two years later his son the 8th Earl was appointed Lt-Col in command of the battalion; he became the battalion's Honorary Colonel in 1899.

Although often referred to as brigades, the sub-districts were purely administrative organisations, but in a continuation of the Cardwell Reforms a mobilisation scheme began to appear in the Army List from December 1875. This assigned Regular and Militia units to places in an order of battle of corps, divisions and brigades for the 'Active Army', even though these formations were entirely theoretical, with no staff or services assigned. The Huntingdon Rifles were assigned to 1st Brigade of 3rd Division, VII Corps. The brigade would have mustered at Darlington in time of war.

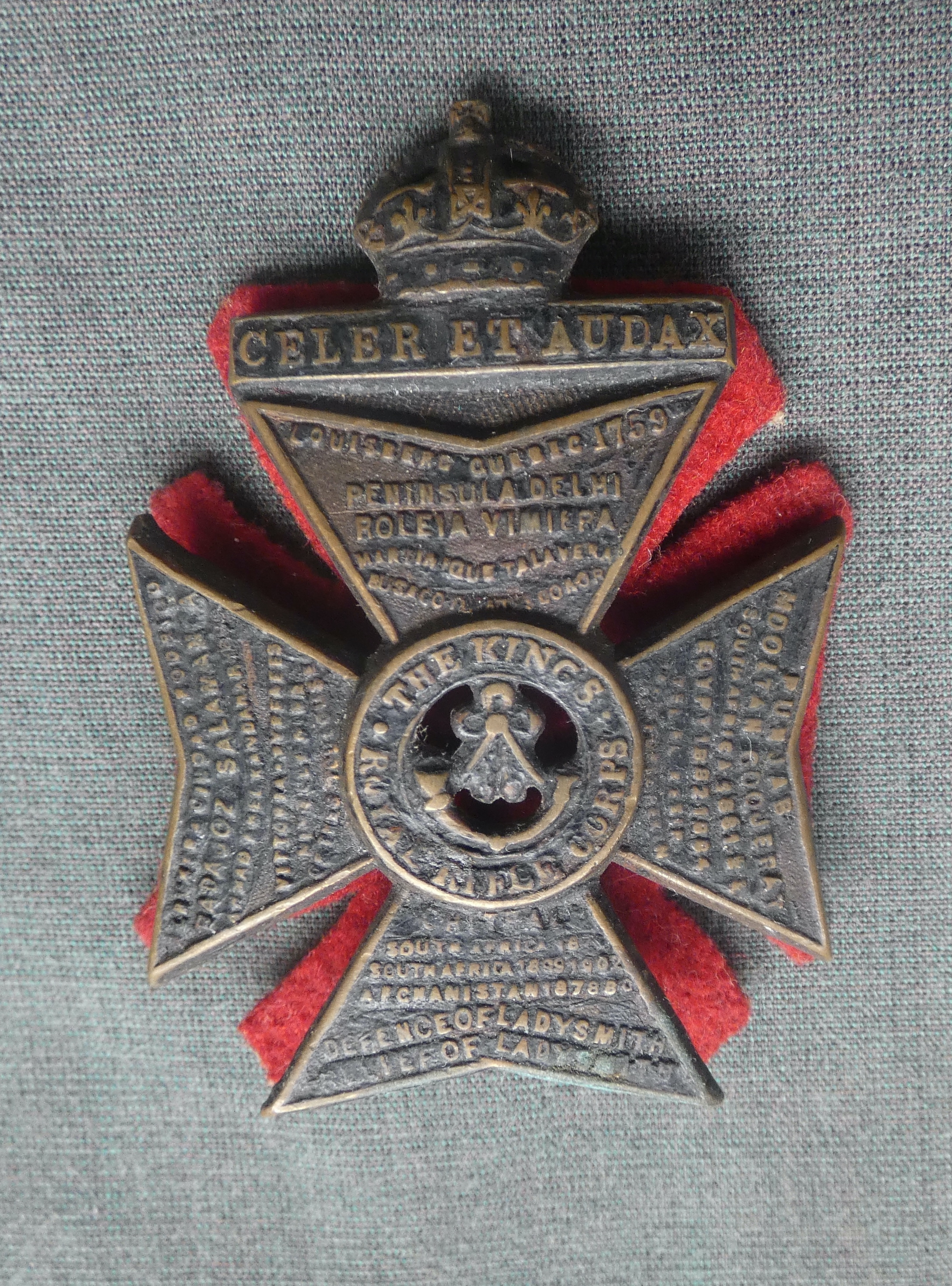
Cap badge of the King's Royal Rifle Corps ca 1918.

== 5th Battalion, King's Royal Rifle Corps ==
The Childers Reforms of 1881 completed the Cardwell process by converting the Regular regiments into two-battalion county regiments, each with two militia battalions. In Sub-District 33 the 16th Foot became the Bedfordshire and Hertfordshire Regiment, with the Bedford and Hertford militia forming its 3rd and 4th battalions. The Huntingdon Rifles were instead attached to the four-battalion King's Royal Rifle Corps (KRRC), which had no county affiliation and was joined by five English, Welsh and Irish Rifle Militia regiments. On 1 July 1881 the Huntingdon Rifles became the 5th (Huntingdon Militia) Battalion, KRRC. It retained its headquarters in Huntingdon, though the main depot for the 'Green Jackets' regiments (KRRC and Rifle Brigade) was at Peninsula Barracks, Winchester.

=== Second Boer War ===
At the outbreak of the Second Boer War in 1899 the Militia Reserve was mobilised on 7 October, just before the Boers invaded Cape Colony and Natal, and during November a few militia battalions were embodied to release regulars for service in South Africa. But after the disasters of Black Week at the start of December 1899, most of the regular army was sent to South Africa, and many more militia units were embodied to replace them for home defence. The 5th KRRC was embodied from 2 May to 4 December 1900.

== Special Reserve ==
After the Boer War, the future of the militia was called into question. There were moves to reform the Auxiliary Forces (Militia, Yeomanry and Volunteers) to take their place in the six Army Corps proposed by the Secretary of State for War, St John Brodrick. However, little of Brodrick's scheme was carried out. Under the more sweeping Haldane Reforms of 1908, the Militia was replaced by the Special Reserve (SR), a semi-professional force whose role was to provide reinforcement drafts for regular units serving overseas in wartime, rather like the earlier Militia Reserve. The 5th (Huntingdon Militia) Battalion, transferred to the SR on 31 May 1908 becoming 5th (Reserve) Battalion, KRRC, and its depot moved to Winchester.

=== 5th (Reserve) Battalion ===
On the outbreak of World War I on 4 August 1914 the 5th KRRC mobilised at Winchester under Lt-Col Richard Byron, a retired regular major, who had commanded the battalion since 22 February 1913. Within a few days it proceeded (with the 6th (Extra Reserve) Bn) to its war station at Sheerness, where it served in the Thames and Medway Garrison. As well as its defensive duties, its role was to equip the Reservists and Special Reservists of the KRRC and send them as reinforcement drafts to the Regular battalions serving overseas (the 1st, 2nd and 4th on the Western Front the 3rd at Salonika). The 5th and 6th (Reserve) Bns also formed the 14th and 15th (Reserve) Bns of the KRRC (see below) at Sheerness to supply reinforcements to the Kitchener's Army units. From 1917 to the Armistice with Germany 5th (R) Bn was at Queenborough in the Thames & Medway Garrison. Lieutenant-Col Guy St Aubyn from 15th (R) Battalion took over as CO from 7 October 1916 until he was invalided and replaced by Lt-Col William Parker-Jervis on 28 June 1918.

=== 14th (Reserve) Battalion ===
After Lord Kitchener issued his call for volunteers in August 1914, the battalions of the 1st, 2nd and 3rd New Armies ('K1', 'K2' and 'K3' of 'Kitchener's Army') were quickly formed at the regimental depots. The SR battalions also swelled with new recruits and were soon well above their establishment strength. On 8 October 1914 each SR battalion was ordered to use the surplus to form a service battalion of the 4th New Army ('K4'). Accordingly, the 5th (Reserve) Bn at Sheerness formed the 14th (Service) Bn on 25 October. Lieutenant-Col Sir Thomas Milborne-Swinnerton-Pilkington, 12th Baronet, a retired KRRC officer who had commanded the old 7th (Royal 2nd Middlesex Militia) Bn, was appointed CO on 9 November. The new battalion was assigned to 92nd Brigade of 31st Division alongside 15th (Service) Bn and began training for active service. In November they moved to billets in Westcliff-on-Sea in Essex. On 10 April 1915 the WO decided to convert the K4 battalions into 2nd Reserve units, providing drafts for the K1–K3 battalions in the same way that the SR was doing for the Regular battalions. The battalion became 14th (Reserve) Bn and 92nd Bde became 4th Reserve Brigade. In May 1915 the battalions moved to Belhus Park, and then in September to Seaford in Sussex with 4th Reserve Bde, where they trained drafts for the 7th, 8th, 9th, 10th, 11th, 12th, and 13th (Service) Bns of the KRRC. Lieutenant-Col Henry Petre took over as CO on 11 July 1916. On 1 September 1916 the 2nd Reserve battalions were transferred to the Training Reserve (TR) and 14th KRRC was split up amongst the other battalions of 4th Reserve Bde.

== Heritage & ceremonial ==
=== Uniforms & insignia ===
From its embodiment in 1759 the regiment wore a red coat with black facings. Similarly, the Regimental colour was black with the coat of arms of the Duke of Manchester in the centre. The regiment retained the black facings after it adopted Rifle green uniforms in 1853. The facings changed to red when the battalion joined the KRRC.

The regimental badge was the arms of the town of Huntingdon, representing a hunting scene with a figure in the foreground said to be Robin Hood. After 1852 the officers' pouchbelt plate had this badge in silver within a crowned garter inscribed 'Huntingdon Rifle Regiment of Militia'. The officers' black buttons at this time carried a bugle-horn. The men's Glengarry cap badge of 1874–81 was an unusual oblong bronze plaque with the arms of Huntingdon in relief. Earlier, around 1809–13, the buttons and officers' shoulder-belt plate had a simple 'H.M.' below a crown. From 1881 the battalion adopted KRRC insignia.

=== Precedence ===
In September 1759 it was ordered that militia regiments on service were to take precedence from the date of their arrival in camp. In 1760 this was altered to a system of drawing lots where regiments did duty together. During the War of American Independence the counties were given an order of precedence determined by ballot each year. For Huntingdonshire the positions were:

- 2nd on 1 June 1778
- 7th on 12 May 1779
- 26th on 6 May 1780
- 6th on 28 April 1781
- 3rd on 7 May 1782

The militia order of precedence balloted for in 1793 (Huntingdonshire was 12th) remained in force throughout the French Revolutionary War. Another ballot for precedence took place in 1803 at the start of the Napoleonic War, when Huntingdonshire was 64th. This order continued until 1833. In that year the king drew the lots for individual regiments and the resulting list remained in force with minor amendments until the end of the militia. The regiments raised before the peace of 1763 took the first 47 places; the Huntingdons were placed at 2nd, and this was retained when the list was revised in 1855. Most militia regiments ignored the numeral.

=== Commanders ===
Commanding officers of the regiment included:

Colonels

- Robert Montagu, 3rd Duke of Manchester, from 23 August 1759
- William Montagu, 5th Duke of Manchester, appointed 8 May 1793
- Thomas Vaughan, appointed 27 September 1827
- John Montagu, 7th Earl of Sandwich, appointed 4 August 1852

Honorary Colonels

- John Montagu, 7th Earl of Sandwich, (former CO) appointed 31 August 1881
- Edward Montagu, 8th Earl of Sandwich, (former CO) appointed 18 January 1899
- Lt-Gen Sir William Campbell, appointed 1917

Commanding Officers

5th Battalion

- Maj Frederick Rooper, promoted Lt-Col 5 October 1881
- Lt-Col Edward Montagu, 8th Earl of Sandwich, appointed 18 September 1886
- Maj Arthur Pixley, appointed 22 February 1899
- Maj John Rhodes, promoted 22 February 1906
- Lt-Col Richard Byron, appointed 22 February 1913
- Lt-Col Guy St Aubyn, appointed 7 October 1916, invalided 28 June 1918
- Lt-Col William Parker-Jervis, appointed 28 June 1918

14th Battalion

- Lt-Col Sir Thomas Milborne-Swinnerton-Pilkington, 12th Baronet, appointed 9 November 1914
- Lt-Col Henry Petre, appointed 11 July 1916

== See also ==
- Trained bands
- Militia (England)
- Militia (Great Britain)
- Militia (United Kingdom)
- King's Royal Rifle Corps

== Notes ==
- W.Y. Baldry, 'Order of Precedence of Militia Regiments', Journal of the Society for Army Historical Research, Vol 15, No 57 (Spring 1936), pp. 5–16.
- Maj A.F. Becke,History of the Great War: Order of Battle of Divisions, Part 3b: New Army Divisions (30–41) and 63rd (R.N.) Division, London: HM Stationery Office, 1939/Uckfield: Naval & Military Press, 2007, ISBN 978-1-84734-741-1.
- Ian F.W. Beckett, The Amateur Military Tradition 1558–1945, Manchester: Manchester University Press, 1991, ISBN 978-0-7190-2912-7/Barnsley: Pen & Sword, 2011.
- Lindsay Boynton, The Elizabethan Militia 1558–1638, London: Routledge & Keegan Paul, 1967.
- C.G. Cruickshank, Elizabeth's Army, 2nd Edn, Oxford: Oxford University Press, 1966.
- Col John K. Dunlop, The Development of the British Army 1899–1914, London: Methuen, 1938.
- Mark Charles Fissel, The Bishops' Wars: Charles I's campaigns against Scotland 1638–1640, Cambridge: Cambridge University Press, 1994, ISBN 978-0-521-34520-0.
- Sir John Fortescue, A History of the British Army, Vol I, 2nd Edn, London: Macmillan, 1910.
- Sir John Fortescue, A History of the British Army, Vol II, London: Macmillan, 1899.
- Sir John Fortescue, A History of the British Army, Vol III, 2nd Edn, London: Macmillan, 1911.
- J.B.M. Frederick, Lineage Book of British Land Forces 1660–1978, Vol I, Wakefield: Microform Academic, 1984, ISBN 978-1-85117-007-4.
- Maj-Gen Sir Steuart Hare, The Annals of the King's Royal Rifle Corps, Vol V: The Great War, London:John Murray. 1932/Uckfield: Naval & Military Press, 2015, ISBN 978-1-84342-456-8.
- Lt-Col H.G. Hart, The New Annual Army List, and Militia List (various dates from 1840).
- Col Sir Charles Harvey, The History of the 4th Battalion Norfolk Regiment (late East Norfolk Militia), London: Jarrold, 1899.
- Col George Jackson Hay, An Epitomized History of the Militia (The Constitutional Force), London:United Service Gazette, 1905.
- Capt Robert Holden, Historical Records of the 3rd and 4th Battalions of the Worcestershire Regiment, London: Kegan, Paul, Trench, 1887.
- Richard Holmes, Soldiers: Army Lives and Loyalties from Redcoats to Dusty Warriors, London: HarperPress, 2011, ISBN 978-0-00-722570-5.
- Brig E.A. James, British Regiments 1914–18, London: Samson Books, 1978, ISBN 978-0-906304-03-7/Uckfield: Naval & Military Press, 2001, ISBN 978-1-84342-197-9.
- Roger Knight, Britain Against Napoleon: The Organization of Victory 1793–1815, London: Allen Lane, 2013/Penguin, 2014, ISBN 978-0-14-103894-0.
- H.G. Parkyn, 'English Militia Regiments 1757–1935: Their Badges and Buttons', Journal of the Society for Army Historical Research, Vol 15, No 60 (Winter 1936), pp. 216–248.
- Arthur Sleigh, The Royal Militia and Yeomanry Cavalry Army List, April 1850, London: British Army Despatch Press, 1850/Uckfield: Naval and Military Press, 1991, ISBN 978-1-84342-410-9.
- Edward M. Spiers, The Army and Society 1815–1914, London: Longmans, 1980, ISBN 978-0-582-48565-5.
- War Office, A List of the Officers of the Militia, the Gentlemen & Yeomanry Cavalry, and Volunteer Infantry of the United Kingdom, 11th Edn, London: War Office, 14 October 1805/Uckfield: Naval and Military Press, 2005, ISBN 978-1-84574-207-2.
- Instructions Issued by the War Office During October 1914, London: HM Stationery Office.
- Instructions Issued by the War Office During April 1915, London: HM Stationery Office.]
- J.R. Western, The English Militia in the Eighteenth Century: The Story of a Political Issue 1660–1802, London: Routledge & Kegan Paul, 1965.
- Ray Westlake, Tracing the Rifle Volunteers, Barnsley: Pen and Sword, 2010, ISBN 978-1-84884-211-3.
