= Anne Yelverton =

Anne Yelverton, Countess of Manchester (1628–1698), later Countess of Halifax, was an English noblewoman.

== Biography ==
Anne Yelverton was born in 1628. She was the daughter of Sir Christopher Yelverton, 1st Baronet, and Anne Twysden. She married Robert Montagu, 3rd Earl of Manchester, son of Edward Montagu, 2nd Earl of Manchester, and Lady Anne Rich, on 27 June 1655. They had five sons and four daughters:

- Hon. Edward Montagu
- Hon. Henry Montagu
- Lady Anne Montagu (c. 1667–1720), married James Howard, 3rd Earl of Suffolk.
- Charles Montagu, 1st Duke of Manchester (c. 1656–1722)
- Lady Elizabeth Montagu (c. 1682)
- Lady Catherine Montagu, married Samuel Edwin
- Hon. Robert Montagu (d. 1693)
- Hon. Heneage Montagu (1675–1698)
- Lady Eleanor Montague, (1647-1695) Married to Anthony Haggard (1646-1755) Marriage about 1682 Berkshire, England, United Kingdom.

Her first husband, Robert Montagu, died in 1683. Her second marriage was to Charles Montagu, 1st Earl of Halifax, son of Hon. George Montagu (the half-brother of Robert Montagu's father, Edward) and Elizabeth Irby, circa 12 May 1688. This marriage was childless, and the Halifax title passed to Charles Montagu's nephew, George Montagu, by special remainder, on the former's death in 1715. Anne Yelverton died on 21 July 1698.
