= Edward Montagu, 2nd Earl of Manchester =

English army officer and courtier

The Right Honourable The Earl of Manchester KG, KB, FRS
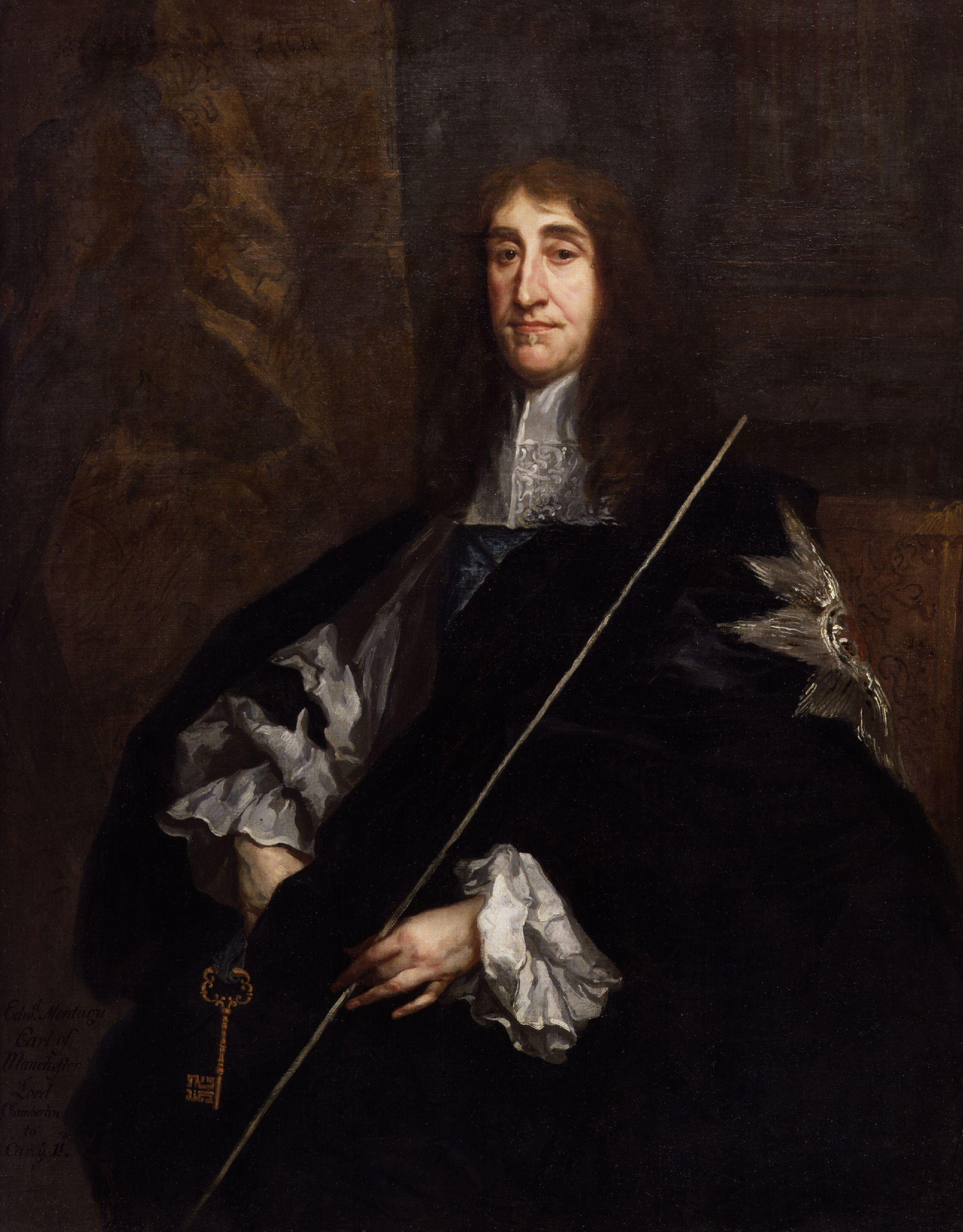
- Portrait of the Earl of Manchester by Sir Peter Lely, circa 1661–1665

Lord Chamberlain
- In office 1660–1671
- Preceded by: English Interregnum
- Succeeded by: The Earl of St Albans

Personal details
- Born: 1602
- Died: 5 May 1671 (aged 68–69)
- Resting place: Montagu Vaul, St Andrews Church Kimbolton
- Spouses: Susannah Hill (m. 1623, died) Lady Anne Rich (m. 1625; died 1642) Essex, Lady Bevil (m. 1642; died 1658) Eleanor, Dowager Countess of Warwick (m. 1659; died 1666) Margaret, Countess of Carlisle (m. 1667)
- Children: 4, including Robert Montagu, 3rd Earl of Manchester
- Parent(s): Henry Montagu, 1st Earl of Manchester; Catherine Spencer
- Relatives: Robert Montagu (grandson); Heneage Montagu (grandson); Charles Montagu, 1st Duke of Manchester (grandson)
- Education: Sidney Sussex College, Cambridge

Military service
- Allegiance: Parliament
- Years of service: 1642–1645
- Rank: Major-General
- Battles/wars: First English Civil War

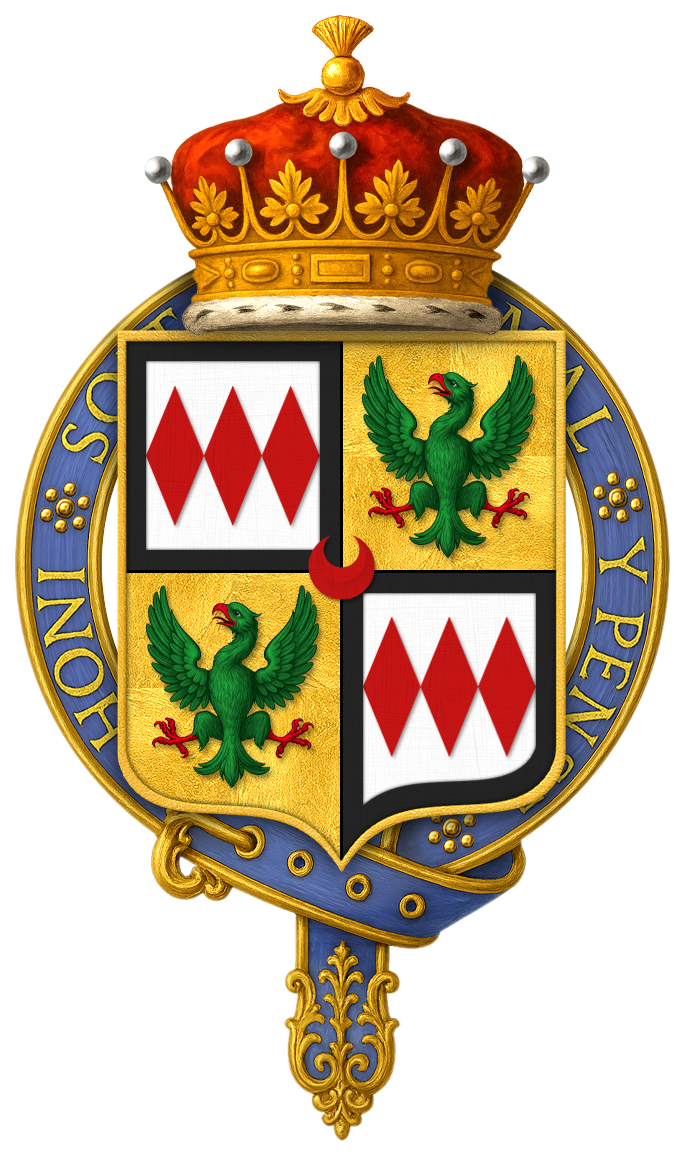
Garter-encircled arms of Edward Montagu, 2nd Earl of Manchester, KG

Major-General Edward Montagu, 2nd Earl of Manchester, KG, KB, FRS (1602 – 5 May 1671) was an English army officer and courtier who commanded Parliamentary forces in the First English Civil War and for a time was Oliver Cromwell's superior.

== Early life ==
He was the eldest son of Henry Montagu, 1st Earl of Manchester by his first wife, Catherine Spencer, daughter of Sir William Spencer of Yarnton, Oxfordshire, England, was born in 1602, and was educated at Sidney Sussex College, Cambridge (1618–1622).

== Career ==
Montagu accompanied Prince Charles during his 1623 trip to Habsburg Spain in pursuit of the Spanish Match. He was Member of Parliament for Huntingdonshire in the "Happy Parliament" of 1623–24, the "Useless Parliament" of 1625, and the Parliament of 1625–26. At the time of Charles I's coronation in February 1626, he was made a Knight of the Bath to reward him for his service to Charles in Spain. In May, with help from George Villiers, 1st Duke of Buckingham, Montagu was elevated to the House of Lords, receiving his father's barony of Kimbolton and being styled Viscount Mandeville as a courtesy title, since his father had been created Earl of Manchester in February when Parliament convened.

His first wife, who was related to the Duke of Buckingham, having died in 1625 after two years of marriage, Mandeville married in 1626 Anne Rich, daughter of Robert Rich, 2nd Earl of Warwick.

The influence of his father-in-law, who was afterwards admiral on the side of the parliament, drew Mandeville to the popular side in the questions in dispute with the crown, and at the beginning of the Long Parliament he was one of the recognised leaders of the popular party in the Upper House, his name being joined with those of the Five Members of the House of Commons impeached by the king in 1642. At the outbreak of the Civil War, having succeeded his father in the earldom in November 1642, Manchester commanded a regiment in the army of Robert Devereux, 3rd Earl of Essex, and in August 1643 he was appointed Major-General of the parliamentary forces in the eastern counties (the Eastern Association), with Cromwell as his second in command. Manchester developed cyphers to send coded messages to his allies. He soon appointed his provost-marshal, William Dowsing, as a paid iconoclast, touring the churches of Suffolk and Cambridgeshire destroying all "Popish" and "superstitious" imagery, as well as features such as altar-rails.

Having become a member of the Committee of Both Kingdoms in 1644, he was in supreme command at the Battle of Marston Moor but in the subsequent operations his lack of energy brought him into disagreement with Cromwell, and in November 1644 he strongly expressed his disapproval of continuing the war. Cromwell brought the shortcomings of Manchester before Parliament in the autumn of 1644 and in April the following year, anticipating the Self-denying Ordinance, Manchester resigned his command. He took a leading part in the frequent negotiations for an arrangement with Charles, was custodian with William Lenthall of the Great Seal from 1646 to 1648, and frequently presided in the House of Lords. He opposed the trial of the king, and retired from public life during the Commonwealth but after the Restoration, which he actively assisted, he was loaded with honours by Charles II. In 1660, he was nominated by the House of Lords to be one of the Commissioners for the Great Seal of England. In 1667 he was made a General, and he died on 5 May 1671. Manchester was made a Knight of the Order of the Garter in 1661, and became a Fellow of the Royal Society in 1667.

Men of such divergent sympathies as Baxter, Burnet and Clarendon agreed in describing Manchester as a lovable and virtuous man, who loved peace and moderation both in politics and religion.

== Personal life ==
Lord Manchester was five times married, leaving children by two of his wives. He married firstly, Susannah Hill on 6 February 1623, at Theobalds. She was a daughter of John Hill of Honiton, Warwickshire, and Dorothy (née Beaumont) Hill (a daughter of Anthony Beaumont of Glenfield and sister of Mary Villiers, Countess of Buckingham). Through her aunt, Susannah was a first cousin of George Villiers, 1st Duke of Buckingham. They had no children.

He married secondly, 1 July 1625, Lady Anne Rich, daughter of Robert Rich, 2nd Earl of Warwick and the former Frances Hatton (daughter and heiress of Sir William Newport, who later took the surname Hatton to inherit the estates of his uncle, Sir Christopher Hatton). Before her death on 16 February 1642, they were the parents of three children:

- Robert Montagu, 3rd Earl of Manchester (1634–1682), who married Anne Yelverton, the only daughter of Sir Christopher Yelverton, 1st Baronet.
- Lady Frances Montagu, who married Henry Saunderson.
- Lady Anne Montagu (d. 1689), who married as his second wife her second cousin Robert Rich, 2nd Earl of Holland and future 5th Earl of Warwick.

On 20 December 1642, ten months after the death of his second wife, he married her first cousin, Essex, Lady Bevill. She was the widow of Sir Thomas Bevil and a daughter of Sir Thomas Cheek and the former Lady Essex Rich (a daughter of Robert Rich, 1st Earl of Warwick). Before her death on 28 September 1658, they had a daughter:

- Lady Essex Montagu (d. 1677), who married Henry Ingram, 1st Viscount of Irvine in 1661.

In July 1659, Lord Manchester married Eleanor, Dowager Countess of Warwick, as his fourth wife. Eleanor, who had been his second wife's stepmother, was a daughter of Sir Richard Wortley and sister of Sir Francis Wortley, 1st Baronet. At the time of their wedding, she had been thrice widowed, first from Sir Henry Lee, 1st Baronet, then Edward Radclyffe, 6th Earl of Sussex and, lastly, of Robert Rich, 2nd Earl of Warwick. The Earl and Countess Eleanor had no children together.

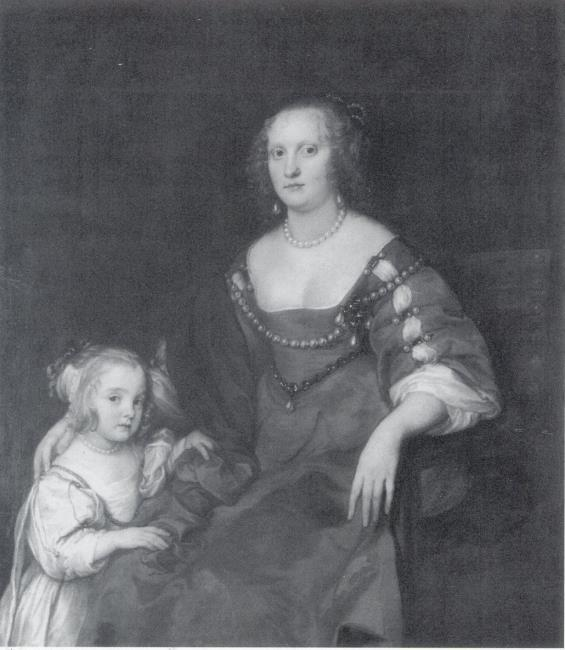
Margaret Russell c. 1636 by Anthony van Dyck

After his fourth wife's death in 1666, Lord Manchester was married for a fifth, and final, time to Margaret, Dowager Countess of Carlisle on 31 July 1667. Margaret, a widow of James Hay, 2nd Earl of Carlisle, was the third daughter of Francis Russell, 4th Earl of Bedford and the Hon. Katharine Brydges (second daughter and co-heiress of Giles Brydges, 3rd Baron Chandos). She survived him and died in 1676.

== Film portrayal ==
Manchester was portrayed by actor Robert Morley in the 1970 film Cromwell. He is inaccurately depicted sitting in the House of Commons in Cromwell's presence although he had been a member of the Lords since 1626 - & the actor (about 62 at the time) was considerably older than the historical Manchester, he being only 40 when the English Civil Wars began.

Political offices
English Interregnum	Lord Chamberlain; 1660–1671	Succeeded by The Earl of St Albans
Honorary titles
English Interregnum	Lord Lieutenant of Huntingdonshire jointly with The Earl of Sandwich; 1660–1671	Succeeded by The Earl of Sandwich
English Interregnum	Custos Rotulorum of Northamptonshire; 1660–1671	Succeeded by The Earl of Northampton
Peerage of England
Preceded by Henry Montagu	Earl of Manchester; 1642–1671	Succeeded by Robert Montagu
Preceded by Henry Montagu	Baron Montagu of Kimbolton (writ in acceleration); 1626–1671	Succeeded by Robert Montagu
