= William Manchester (disambiguation) =

William Manchester was a historian.

William Manchester may also refer to:

- William Manchester (MP) for Carlisle (UK Parliament constituency)
- William Montagu, 7th Duke of Manchester
- William Montagu, 2nd Duke of Manchester
- William Montagu, 5th Duke of Manchester
- William Montagu, 9th Duke of Manchester
