= John Hussey-Montagu, Lord Montagu =

John Hussey-Montagu, Lord Montagu (18 January 1747 – 25 June 1787) was a British politician who sat in the House of Commons from 1772 to 1787.

He was born John Hussey, only son of Edward Hussey of Westown, County Dublin, by his wife Isabella, widow of William Montagu, 2nd Duke of Manchester, and eldest daughter of John Montagu, 2nd Duke of Montagu. Edward Hussey adopted the additional surname of Montagu in 1749 on the death of the Duke of Montagu. In 1762 he was created a Baron, and his son became The Hon. John Hussey-Montagu.

John Hussey-Montagu was elected to Parliament for Windsor on 9 November 1772 following the death of Richard Tonson. He was re-elected at the general elections of 1774, 1780 and 1784. In July 1784 his father was created Earl of Beaulieu, and Hussey-Montagu adopted the courtesy title Lord Montagu.

He died unmarried at the age of 40, and was buried on 10 July 1787 at Warkton in Northamptonshire. The Earl of Mornington was elected for Windsor in his place. As his only sibling was a sister Isabella. who had died in 1772, the earldom of Beaulieu became extinct on his father's death in 1802.

Parliament of Great Britain
Preceded by Hon. Augustus Keppel; Richard Tonson	Member of Parliament for New Windsor; 1772–1787; With: Hon. Augustus Keppel 1772-1780; Peniston Portlock Powney 1780-1787	Succeeded by The Earl of Mornington; Peniston Portlock Powney
