= Earl Beaulieu =

Earldom in the Peerage of Great Britain

Earl Beaulieu (pronounced "Bewley"), of Beaulieu in the County of Southampton, was a title in the Peerage of Great Britain. It was created in 1784 for the 1st Baron Beaulieu, who had earlier represented Tiverton in the House of Commons. He had previously been created Baron Beaulieu, of Beaulieu in the County of Southampton, in 1762, also in the Peerage of Great Britain.

Born Edward Hussey, he was the husband of Lady Isabella Montagu, widow of the 2nd Duke of Manchester and daughter of the 2nd Duke of Montagu, and had assumed by Royal Licence the additional surname of Montagu in 1749. His son and heir, John, Lord Montagu, predeceased him. Consequently, both titles became extinct on Lord Beaulieu's death in 1802. Between 1790 and 1802, Earl Beaulieu also held the title Lord of Bowland, a lordship he inherited on the death of his father-in-law. On his death, the Lordship of Bowland passed to his sister-in-law's husband, Henry Scott, 3rd Duke of Buccleuch.

== Earls Beaulieu (1784) ==
- Edward Hussey-Montagu, 1st Earl Beaulieu (died 1802)
  - John Hussey-Montagu, Lord Montagu (1747–1787)

== See also ==
- Duke of Montagu
- Duke of Manchester
- Baron Montagu of Beaulieu
