= Edward Hussey-Montagu, 1st Earl Beaulieu =

British politician (1721–1802)

Edward Hussey
- Earl of Beaulieu
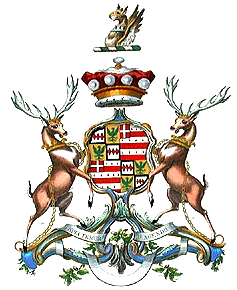
- His arms as 1st Baron Beaulieu
- Reign: 1784–1802
- Died: 25 November 1802; Dover Street, London
- Spouse: Isabella Montagu
- Issue Detail: John Hussey-Montagu, & others
- Father: James Hussey
- Mother: Catherine Parsons

Edward Hussey-Montagu, 1st Earl Beaulieu, KB (1721–1802), was a British politician. He was married to Isabella Montagu, Dowager Duchess of Manchester, a rich heiress.

== Birth and origins ==
Family tree: Lord Beaulieu

Edward Hussey-Montagu with wife, parents, and other selected relatives.

George; Hamilton d. 1676; Soldier	Frances; Jennings c. 1647 – 1730; Beauty	Richard; Talbot; Earl; Tyrconnell; 1630–1691
Richard; 1st Viscount; Rosse; 1657–1703	Elizabeth; 1667–1724
Richard; 1st Earl; Rosse d. 1741	James; Hussey d. 1759	Catherine; Parsons d. 1766
Richard; 2nd Earl; 1716–1764	1st Earl; Beaulieu d. 1802	Isabella; Montagu d. 1786
John; Lord Montagu; 1747–1787) d.v.p.*

Legend

XXX	Subject of the article	XXX	Earls of Beaulieu	XXX	Viscounts & earls of Rosse
XXX	Earls of Tyrconnell

d.v.p. = decessit vita patris (predeceased his father).

Edward was born in 1721, the son of James Hussey and his wife Catherine Parsons. His father's family was Old English, a cadet branch of the Husseys. The Husseys had come to Ireland in 1172, and became substantial landowners in County Meath and County Kerry. The senior branch of the family held the title Baron Galtrim, although this appears to have been an Irish feudal barony rather than a peerage and did not entitle its holder to sit in the Irish House of Lords. His mother was a daughter of Richard Parsons, 1st Viscount Rosse.

== Marriage and children ==
In 1743, Hussey married Isabella Montagu, Dowager Duchess of Manchester, a rich heiress, first daughter and co-heiress of the 2nd Duke of Montagu and Lady Mary née Churchill (a daughter of the 1st Duke of Marlborough). In 1749, he legally changed his surname to Hussey-Montagu.

Edward and Isabella had two children:

1. Isabella Hussey-Montagu (1750–1772)
2. John (1747–1787), MP 1772–1787, styled Baron Montagu

Both children predeceased their parents and died without descendants. In 1753 he was made a Knight Companion of the Bath.

Hussey had one child from Martha Howel, a housemaid in the service of Lord Beaulieu:

- Elizabeth Hussey, 1780–1865, "described or alleged to be his natural daughter" (600 descendants in October 2012, mainly in France).

== MP ==
From 1758 to 1762, he was Member of Parliament for Tiverton and a Whig.

== Earl of Beaulieu ==
On his retirement from parliament, Hussey was on 11 May 1762, raised to the peerage as Baron Beaulieu, of Beaulieu in the Hampshire (called the County of Southampton from 1889 to 1959), and later advanced to Earl Beaulieu in 1784, both in the peerage of Ireland.

== Death ==
Beaulieu, as he now was, died on 25 November 1802 in Dover Street (off Piccadilly), London. As his only son had predeceased him in 1787, his titles became extinct. He was buried on 14 December that year at Warkton, Northamptonshire.

== Citations and sources ==
=== Sources ===
- Cokayne, George Edward (1912). Gibbs, Vicary (ed.). The complete peerage of England, Scotland, Ireland, Great Britain and the United Kingdom, extant, extinct, or dormant. Vol. II (2nd ed.). London: St Catherine Press. OCLC 228661424. – Bass to Canning (for Beaulieu)
- Lodge, John (1789). Archdall, Mervyn (ed.). The Peerage of Ireland or, A Genealogical History of the Present Nobility of that Kingdom. Vol. VII. Dublin: James Moore. OCLC 264906028. – Barons (for Hussey)
- Malcomson, Anthony P. W. (2006). In Pursuit of a Heiress. Belfast: Ulster Historical Foundation. ISBN 978-1-903688-65-6.
- Shaw, William A. (1906). The Knights of England. Vol. I. London: Sherratt & Hughes. – Knights of orders of chivalry
- National Archives File Ref : PROB 37/80 Prerogative court of Canterbury, Cause Papers.
- The House of Commons, 1754–1790, Volume 2 / Lewis Namier, John Brooke pp 664–5.
- Parliamentary Archives, Houses of Parliament, London.
- The Gentleman's Magazine 1802, p 1167.

Parliament of Great Britain
Preceded by Henry Pelham; Nathaniel Ryder	Member of Parliament for Tiverton; 1758–1762; With: Nathaniel Ryder	Succeeded by Nathaniel Ryder; Charles Gore
Peerage of Great Britain
New creation	Earl Beaulieu; 1784–1802	Extinct
New creation	Baron Beaulieu; 1762–1802	Extinct
