= Ralph Sydenham =

Sir Ralph Sydenham (died 1671) was an English politician who sat in the House of Commons from 1641 to 1642. He supported the Royalist cause in the English Civil War.

Sydenham was the son of Sir John Sydenham of Brimpton. He was knighted in Scotland on 17 July 1617.

In 1641, Sydenham was elected Member of Parliament for Bossiney in the Long Parliament in place of Clotworthy who sat for Maldon. Sydenham followed the King to Oxford and was thus disabled from sitting in parliament on 29 September 1642. He compounded for his delinquency in a fine of £500. He lived at Youlston, Devon.

Following the Restoration in 1660, Sydenham was made Master of Charterhouse and remained in post until his death in 1671.

In 1629, Sydenham married Mary, the widow of Sir Arthur Chichester, at St Mary Abbots Church, Kensington and had a family.

Parliament of England
Preceded by Sir Christopher Yelverton, 1st Baronet; Sir John Clotworthy	Member of Parliament for Bossiney; 1641–1642; With: Sir Christopher Yelverton, 1st Baronet	Succeeded by Sir Christopher Yelverton, 1st Baronet; Lionel Copley
