= Custos Rotulorum of Huntingdonshire =

Civic post in Huntingtonshire, England

This is a list of people who have served as Custos Rotulorum (Keeper of the Rolls) of Huntingdonshire.

- Sir Richard Cromwell bef. 1544
- William Cooke 1544–1553
- Sir Robert Tyrwhitt bef. 1558 – bef. 1562
- William Lawrence bef. 1562 – aft. 1564
- Sir James Dyer bef. 1573 – c. 1579
- Sir Christopher Wray c. 1579 – bef. 1584
- Sir Henry Cromwell bef. 1584–1604
- Sir Oliver Cromwell c. 1605–1646
- Interregnum
- Edward Montagu, 1st Earl of Sandwich 1660–1672
- Robert Montagu, 3rd Earl of Manchester 1672–1681

For later custodes rotulorum, see Lord Lieutenant of Huntingdonshire.
