= Mary Montagu, Duchess of Montagu (1689–1751) =

British court official and noble

Her Grace The Duchess of Montagu
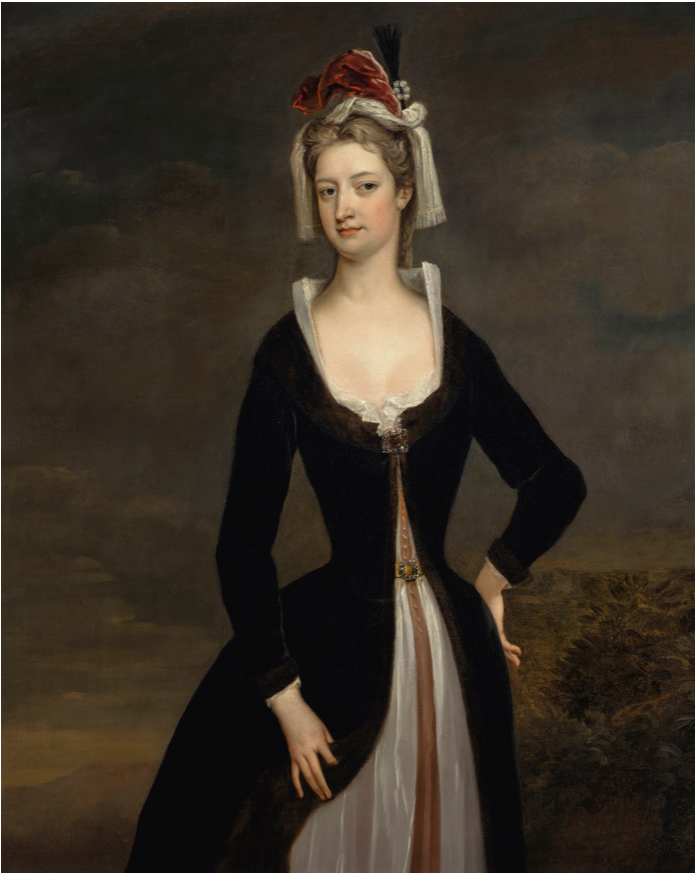
- Portrait by Charles Jervas
- Born: Lady Mary Churchill; 15 July 1689
- Died: 14 May 1751 (aged 61)
- Spouse: John Montagu, 2nd Duke of Montagu (m. 1705)
- Issue: Isabella Montagu, Duchess of Manchester; John Montagu; George Montagu; Mary Montagu, Duchess of Montagu; Edward Montagu
- Father: John Churchill, 1st Duke of Marlborough
- Mother: Sarah Jenyns

Mary Montagu, Duchess of Montagu (née Churchill; 15 July 1689 – 14 May 1751) was a British court official and noble, the wife of John Montagu, 2nd Duke of Montagu and a member of the Shakespeare Ladies Club. She was the youngest surviving daughter of John Churchill, 1st Duke of Marlborough, and his wife, Sarah Jenyns.

== Life ==
She married Montagu on 17 March 1705, when he was Earl of Montagu. They had five children:

- Isabella (с. 1706 - d. 20 December 1786), who married first William Montagu, 2nd Duke of Manchester, and second Edward Hussey-Montagu, 1st Earl of Beaulieu; there were children from her second marriage only.
- John (1706–1711)
- George (died in infancy)
- Mary (c. 1711 – 1 May 1775), who married George Brudenell, 4th Earl of Cardigan, and had children.
- Edward (27 December 1725 – May 1727)

Mary had a fractious relationship with her mother Sarah Churchill, Duchess of Marlborough, the one time 'Favourite' of Queen Anne - but was close to her father John Churchill, 1st Duke of Marlborough. It was said that Mary was her father's favourite child, the daughter who most resembled Sarah Churchill and that mother displayed an infantile jealousy towards Mary From 1714 to 1717, the Duchess was a Lady of the Bedchamber to Caroline of Ansbach, then Princess of Wales. She was painted by Sir Godfrey Kneller in 1740. A portrait of her with her husband and daughter was painted in about 1729 by Gawen Hamilton. The duchess is obliquely referred to in Delarivier Manley's 1709 satire, The New Atalantis.

Mary Montagu was a well known and popular member of the fashionable London social set and she and husband John were sympathetic to the Patriot Whig movement who were opposed to Prime Minister Robert Walpole. Mary and John Montagu were devoted patrons of George Frideric Handel. Mary joined the Shakespeare Ladies Club in 1737. Founded by Susanna Ashley-Cooper, The 4th Countess of Shaftesbury, the club commenced a campaign to 'save British culture' by lobbying theatre managers to restore Shakespeare's original plays back to the London stage and to finally raise a monument to The Bard in Poets' Corner Westminster Abbey. The Shakespeare Ladies Club achieved their aims and in 1740 (old style dating) the Shakespeare statue was placed in Westminster Abbey. The women's campaign for more Shakespeare plays was also successful, achieving a quarter of all plays on the London stage by 1740, being Shakespeare originals or derivatives. Mary Montagu (and the club) was the subject of an ode written by the poet Francis Hawling, To her Grace the Dutchess of Montague And the Rest of the Illustrious Ladies of SHAKESPEAR'S Club.

One of those who benefited from the duchess's will was Ignatius Sancho, an African slave whom she took on as a butler following her husband's death. Mary had overseen Sancho's education and she and John Montagu included him in their family circle, introducing him to composers, artists, actors and writers. Mary left him a pension, but, having failed to find an alternative career, he later returned to the service of the Montagu family.

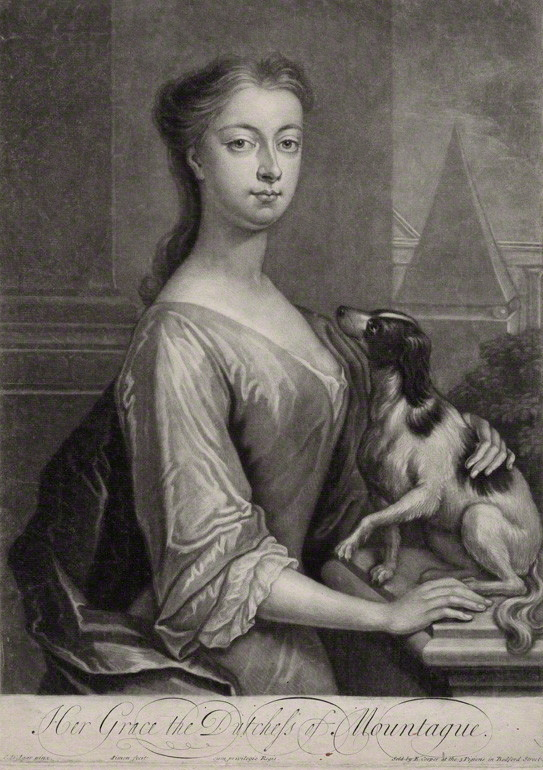
Engraving by John Simon of Mary Montagu, Duchess of Montagu

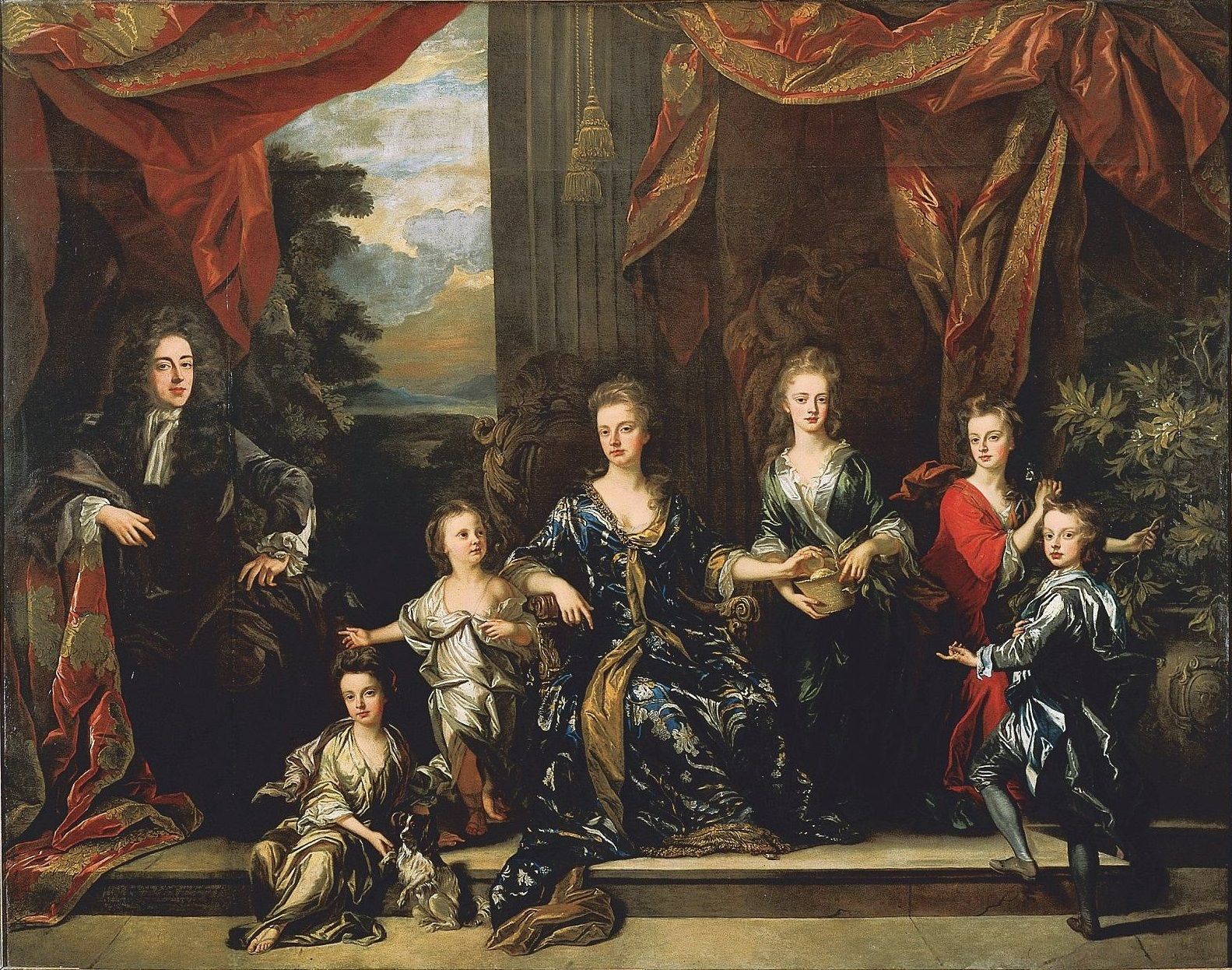
The family of John Churchill, 1st Duke of Marlborough. From left to right: The Duke of Marlborough, Elizabeth, Mary, The Duchess of Marlborough, Henrietta, Anne and John

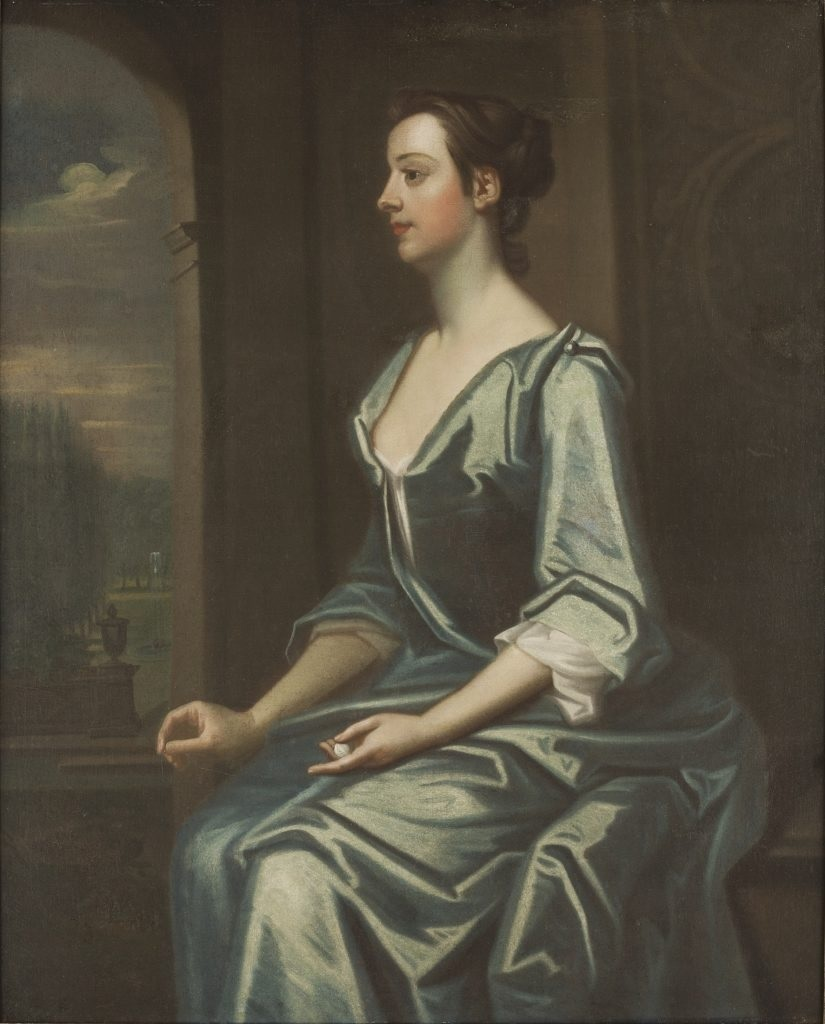
Mary Montagu (nee Churchill) 2nd Duchess of Montagu (painted 1722-26)

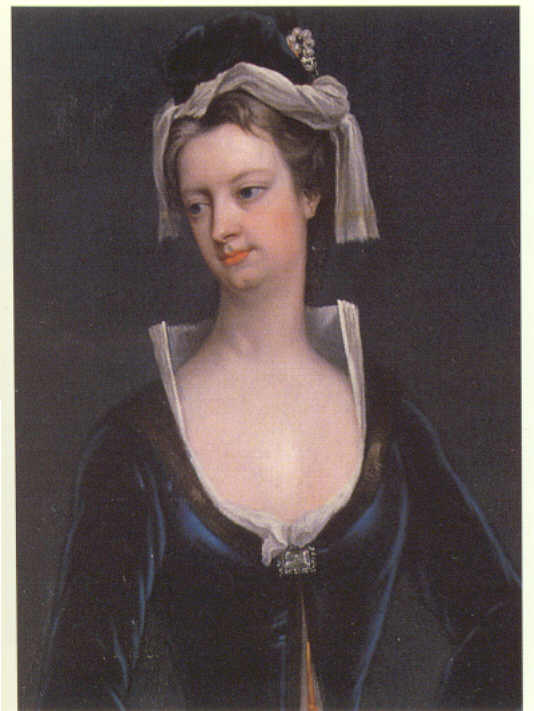
