= Edward Montagu, 8th Earl of Sandwich =

British politician (1839–1916)

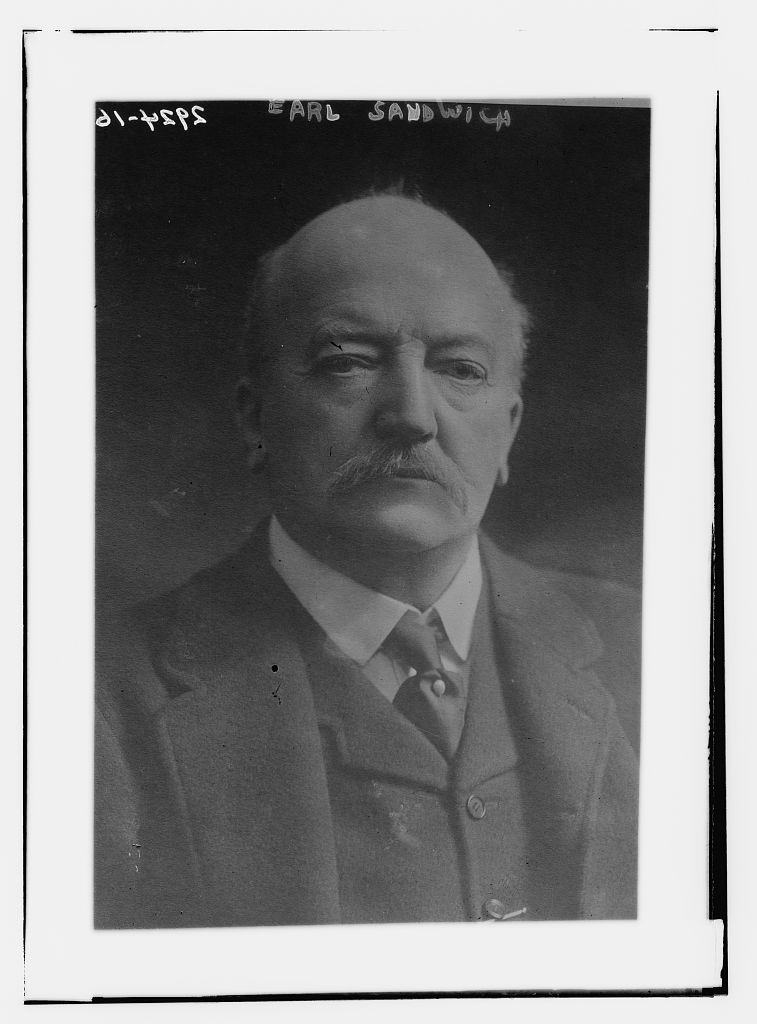
The Earl of Sandwich.

Edward George Henry Montagu, 8th Earl of Sandwich KStJ (13 July 1839 – 26 June 1916), styled Viscount Hinchingbrooke until 1884, was a British peer, Conservative politician, soldier and author.

Montagu was the eldest son of John William Montagu, 7th Earl of Sandwich, and his wife Lady Mary Paget. Field Marshal Henry Paget, 1st Marquess of Anglesey, was his maternal grandfather. He was elected to the House of Commons for Huntingdon in 1876, a seat he held until 1884, when he succeeded his father in the earldom and took his seat in the House of Lords.

As Viscount Hinchinbrooke he served in the Grenadier Guards from 1857 to 1884, attaining the regimental rank of Major and Colonel. After succeeding to the earldom he became Lieutenant-Colonel in command of the part-time 5th (Huntingdon Militia) Battalion, King's Royal Rifle Corps (several of his ancestors and Montagu kinsmen having previously commanded the Huntingdonshire Militia), and its Honorary Colonel from 1899. He was also Hon Colonel of the Huntingdonshire Cyclist Battalion in the Territorial Force. He served as Lord Lieutenant of Huntingdonshire between 1891 and 1916. He was appointed a Knight of Grace of the Venerable Order of Saint John of Jerusalem in December 1901.

Lord Sandwich died unmarried in June 1916, aged 76, and was succeeded in the earldom by his nephew George Charles Montagu.

== Works ==
Lord Sandwich was the author of five books:

- Diary in Ceylon & India, 1878-9. 1879
- Hinchingbrooke. 1910
- My Experiences in Spiritual Healing. 1915
- Memoirs 1919
- Memoirs of Edward, Earl of Sandwich, 1839-1916, Ed. 1919 (co-authored with Beatrice Erskine, "Mrs. Steuart Erskine")

== Notes ==
Parliament of the United Kingdom
Preceded by Sir John Burgess Karslake	Member of Parliament for Huntingdon; 1876–1884	Succeeded by Sir Robert Peel
Honorary titles
Preceded by The Duke of Bedford	Lord Lieutenant of Huntingdonshire; 1891–1916	Succeeded by Howard Coote
Peerage of England
Preceded by John William Montagu	Earl of Sandwich; 1884–1916	Succeeded by George Charles Montagu
