= Robert Montagu, 3rd Earl of Manchester =

English politician (1634–1683)

The Right Honourable The Earl of Manchester JP

Member of Parliament for Huntingdonshire
- In office 1660–1671 Serving with Henry Cromwell
- Preceded by: Edward Montagu; Valentine Walton
- Succeeded by: Henry Cromwell; Sir Nicholas Pedley

Personal details
- Born: 25 April 1634; St. Margaret's, Westminster, England
- Died: 14 March 1683 (aged 48); Montpellier, France
- Spouse: Anne Yelverton (m. 1655)
- Children: 9
- Parent(s): Edward Montagu, 2nd Earl of Manchester; Lady Anne Rich

Robert Montagu, 3rd Earl of Manchester JP (baptised 25 April 1634 – 14 March 1683) was an English courtier and politician who sat in the House of Commons from 1660 to 1671 when he inherited the peerage as Earl of Manchester.

== Early life ==
Montagu was born in the parish of St. Margaret's, Westminster, and baptised there on 25 April 1634. He was the only son of Edward Montagu, 2nd Earl of Manchester and his second wife Lady Anne Rich, daughter of Robert Rich, 2nd Earl of Warwick. He had two younger sisters, Lady Frances Montagu (wife of Henry Saunderson) and Lady Anne Montagu (wife of their cousin, Robert Rich, 5th Earl of Warwick). After his mother's death on 14 February 1641, his father remarried to Essex (née Cheke) Bevill (widow of Sir Robert Bevill and a daughter of Sir Thomas Cheke). From his father's third marriage, he had a younger half-sister, Lady Essex Montagu (wife of Henry Ingram, 1st Viscount of Irvine). After his father's third wife died, he remarried to Eleanor Rich (a widow of Sir Henry Lee, 1st Baronet, Edward Radclyffe, 6th Earl of Sussex, and Robert Rich, 2nd Earl of Warwick. She was the fourth daughter of Sir Richard Wortley). After her death in January 1666, he married for the fifth, and last, time to Lady Margaret Hay (widow of James Hay, 2nd Earl of Carlisle, the third daughter of Francis Russell, 4th Earl of Bedford).

His paternal grandparents were Henry Montagu, 1st Earl of Manchester and the former Catherine Spencer (a granddaughter of Sir William Spencer of Yarnton). His maternal grandparents were Robert Rich, 2nd Earl of Warwick and the former Frances Hatton (daughter and heiress of Sir William Newport, who later took the surname Hatton to inherit the estates of his uncle, Sir Christopher Hatton).

== Career ==
From 1649 to 1654, he was travelling abroad. He was captain of the militia horse for Huntingdonshire in April 1660.

Also in April 1660, Montagu was returned as Member of Parliament for Huntingdonshire in the Convention Parliament and in the following month was one of the members who waited on the king at the Hague.

He was a J.P. for Huntingdonshire and Northamptonshire, from July 1660 to 1681. Also in July, he was commissioner for oyer and terminer for the Midland circuit. From August 1660, he was commissioner for assessment and Deputy Lieutenant for Huntingdonshire until 1671.

In 1661, Montagu was again elected MP for Huntingdonshire in the Cavalier Parliament. In 1663, he became commissioner for assessment for Huntingdon and Northamptonshire until 1671, and was sent on a mission to the French king. He was created M.A. by the University of Oxford, on 8 September 1665.

In February 1666, he succeeded the Earl of Newport as gentleman of the bedchamber to the king. In 1666 and 1667, Montagu was a captain of the Duke of Monmouth's Horse in the eastern counties while the Dutch were on the coast.

Montagu inherited the title of Earl of Manchester on the death of his father in 1671 and took on the posts of Lord Lieutenant of Huntingdonshire and Custos Rotulorum. In 1672 he became master of the swans and also water-bailiff for Whittlesey Mere. He became high steward of Cambridge University in 1677.

In October 1681 Lord Manchester decided to go abroad because he had become too closely involved with cabalistic men in Northamptonshire.

== Personal life ==
On 27 June 1655, Montagu was married to Anne Yelverton at St. Giles's-in-the-Fields. Anne was the only daughter of Sir Christopher Yelverton, 1st Baronet of Easton Maudit in Northamptonshire and Anne Twisden (youngest daughter of Sir Thomas Twisden, 1st Baronet of Roydon Hall). Together, Anne and Robert were the parents of five sons and four daughters, including:

- Hon. Edward Montagu, who died young.
- Hon. Henry Montagu, who died young.
- Anne Montagu (c. 1667–1720), who married, as his third wife, James Howard, 3rd Earl of Suffolk, a son of Theophilus Howard, 2nd Earl of Suffolk.
- Charles, Duke of Manchester (c. 1656–1722), who married the Hon. Doddington Greville, a daughter of Robert Greville, 4th Baron Brooke of Beauchamps Court and Anne (née Doddington) Greville
- Lady Elizabeth Montagu (b. c. 1682), who married her cousin, Sir James Montagu, Chief Baron of the Exchequer.
- Lady Catherine Montagu, married Samuel Edwin of Llanvihangel.
- Hon. Robert Montagu (d. 1693), an MP from Huntingdonshire.
- Hon. Heneage Montagu (1675–1698), also an MP from Huntingdonshire.
- Lady Eleanor Montagu. Died unmarried in 1696 (PCC will 1696, Bond, folio 276)

He died at Montpellier in France at the age of about 48 and was buried at Kimbolton. His two eldest sons, Edward and Henry, died young and he was succeeded by his third son, Charles. His widow afterwards married Charles Montagu, 1st Earl of Halifax.

Parliament of England
Preceded by Edward Montagu; Valentine Walton	Member of Parliament for Huntingdonshire; 1660–1671; With: Henry Cromwell	Succeeded by Henry Cromwell; Sir Nicholas Pedley
Honorary titles
Preceded by The 1st Earl of Sandwich	Lord Lieutenant of Huntingdonshire jointly with The 1st Earl of Sandwich 1671–1672; 1671–1681	Succeeded by The Earl of Ailesbury (for The 2nd Earl of Sandwich)
Preceded by The 1st Earl of Sandwich	Custos Rotulorum of Huntingdonshire; 1672–1681	Succeeded by The Earl of Ailesbury (for The 2nd Earl of Sandwich)
Peerage of England
Preceded by Edward Montagu	Earl of Manchester; 1671–1683	Succeeded by Charles Montagu
