= John Montagu, 7th Earl of Sandwich =

British peer and politician (1811–1884)

The Right Honourable The Earl of Sandwich PC
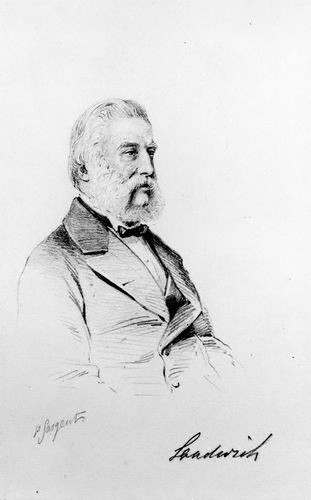
- The Earl of Sandwich.

Captain of the Honourable Corps of Gentlemen-at-Arms
- In office 27 February 1852 – 17 December 1852
- Monarch: Victoria
- Prime Minister: The Earl of Derby
- Preceded by: The Lord Foley
- Succeeded by: The Lord Foley

Master of the Buckhounds
- In office 26 February 1858 – 11 June 1859
- Monarch: Victoria
- Prime Minister: The Earl of Derby
- Preceded by: The Earl of Bessborough
- Succeeded by: The Earl of Bessborough

Personal details
- Born: 8 November 1811
- Died: 3 March 1884 (aged 72)
- Party: Conservative
- Spouse(s): (1) Lady Mary Paget (d. 1859) (2) Lady Blanche Egerton (d. 1894)
- Children: Edward Montagu, 8th Earl of Sandwich
- Parent(s): George Montagu, 6th Earl of Sandwich; Lady Louisa Mary Ann Julia Harriett
- Education: Trinity College, Cambridge

John William Montagu, 7th Earl of Sandwich PC (8 November 1811 – 3 March 1884), styled Viscount Hinchingbrooke from 1814 to 1818, was a British peer and Conservative politician. He served under Lord Derby as Captain of the Honourable Corps of Gentlemen-at-Arms in 1852 and as Master of the Buckhounds between 1858 and 1859.

== Background and education ==
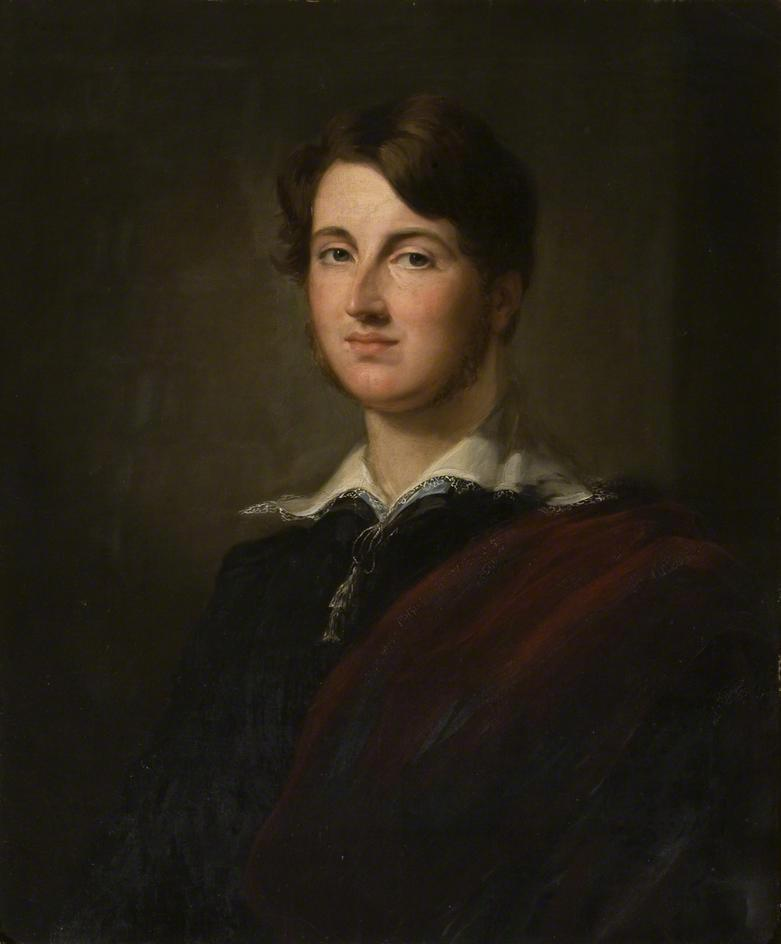
The Earl of Sandwich as a young man by Sir George Hayter.

Montagu was the son of George Montagu, 6th Earl of Sandwich, and his wife Lady Louisa Mary Ann Julia Harriett, daughter of Armar Lowry-Corry, 1st Earl Belmore. He succeeded his father in the earldom in 1818 at the age of six. He was educated at Eton and Trinity College, Cambridge. While at Cambridge he played two matches for the Cambridge University Cricket Club.

== Military career ==
He was commissioned as a Captain in the disembodied Huntingdonshire Militia on 23 March 1831. The following year he purchased the rank of Ensign & Lieutenant in the Grenadier Guards, retiring on 24 July 1835. He became Lord Lieutenant of Huntingdonshire in 1841 and when the Militia was revived in 1852 he took personal command of the reformed Huntingdonshire Rifles as Colonel. He commanded the regiment until he became the first Honorary Colonel of its successor, the 5th (Huntingdon Militia) Battalion, King's Royal Rifle Corps, on 31 August 1881.

== Political career ==
Lord Sandwich served in the Earl of Derby's first administration as Captain of the Honourable Corps of Gentlemen-at-Arms from February to December 1852 and was admitted to the Privy Council the same year. When the Conservatives returned to power under Derby in 1858 Sandwich was appointed Master of the Buckhounds, an office he retained until the government fell the following year. Apart from his political career he was also Lord-Lieutenant of Huntingdonshire between 1841 and 1884.

== Marriages and issue ==
Lord Sandwich married firstly Lady Mary Paget, daughter of Field Marshal Henry Paget, 1st Marquess of Anglesey, in 1838. They had four sons and two daughters:

- Edward George Henry Montagu, Viscount Hinchingbrooke (1839–1916), succeeded his father as 8th Earl of Sandwich, died unmarried
- Rear-Admiral Victor Alexander Montagu (20 April 1841 – 30 January 1915), married Lady Agneta Yorke, daughter of Adm. Charles Yorke, 4th Earl of Hardwicke, and were parents of:
  - George Montagu, 9th Earl of Sandwich
- Hon. Sydney Montagu (12 August 1842 – 4 April 1860), died young
- Col. Hon. Oliver George Paulet Montagu (18 October 1844 – 24 January 1893), died unmarried
- Lady Emily Caroline Hart Dyke (19 December 1846 – 8 August 1931) married Sir William Hart Dyke, 7th Bt.
- Lady Anne Florence Adelaide Montagu (8 November 1848 – 16 January 1940), married Capt. Alfred Duncombe, son of Rev. Augustus Duncombe and grandson of 6th Marquess of Queensberry

After her death in 1859 he married secondly Lady Blanche Egerton, daughter of Francis Egerton, 1st Earl of Ellesmere, in 1865.

He died in March 1884, aged 72, and was succeeded in his titles by his eldest son from his first marriage, Edward. The Countess of Sandwich died in 1894.

Political offices
| Preceded by The Lord Foley | Captain of the Honourable Corps of Gentlemen-at-Arms; 1852 | Succeeded by The Lord Foley |
| Preceded by The Earl of Bessborough | Master of the Buckhounds; 1858–1859 | Succeeded by The Earl of Bessborough |
Honorary titles
| Preceded by The Duke of Manchester | Lord Lieutenant of Huntingdonshire; 1841–1884 | Succeeded by The Duke of Bedford |
Peerage of England
| Preceded by George Montagu | Earl of Sandwich; 1818–1884 | Succeeded by Edward George Henry Montagu |
