= Isabella Montagu, Duchess of Manchester =

Her Grace The Duchess of Manchester
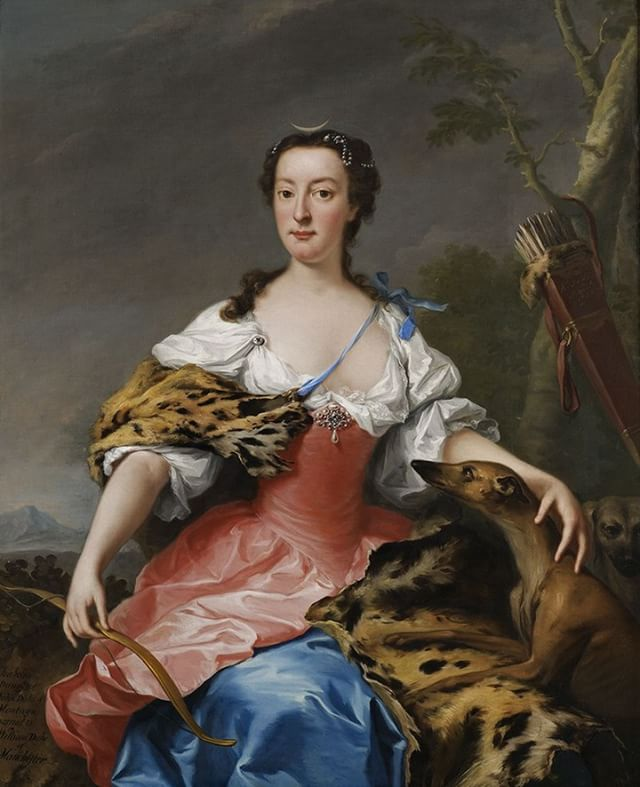
- Portrait, 1738
- Born: Lady Isabella Montagu c. 1706
- Died: 20 December 1786
- Spouses: William Montagu, 2nd Duke of Manchester (m. 1723; died 1739) Edward Hussey-Montagu, 1st Earl Beaulieu (m. 1743)
- Children: John Hussey-Montagu, Lord Montagu; Isabella Hussey-Montagu
- Parents: John Montagu, 2nd Duke of Montagu (father); Lady Mary Churchill (mother)

Isabella Montagu, Duchess of Manchester (c. 1706 – 20 December 1786), formerly Lady Isabella Montagu, was the wife of William Montagu, 2nd Duke of Manchester.

She was the daughter of John Montagu, 2nd Duke of Montagu, and his wife, the former Lady Mary Churchill. Her sister, Mary, became Countess of Cardigan. Their three brothers all died in childhood.

She married the Duke of Manchester on 16 April 1723, about two years after he had inherited the dukedom. They were childless, and remained married until the Duke's death in 1739.

The Duchess remarried, in 1743, the politician Edward Hussey-Montagu, who was raised to the peerage in 1762 as Baron Beaulieu and in 1784 was created Earl Beaulieu.

There were two children from this second marriage:

- John Hussey-Montagu, Lord Montagu (1746-1787), MP for Windsor, who died unmarried and childless
- Isabella Hussey-Montagu (1750-1772)

Isabella was one of the twenty-one 'ladies of quality and distinction' who supported Thomas Coram's efforts to establish a Foundling Hospital, who are now credited with making the endeavour a success by lending it respectability and style. She added her name to his petition on 6 January 1730, which was later presented to King George II in 1735.

The Duchess was known as a talented amateur artist, who, according to Horace Walpole, "painted remarkably well in crayons".

It was said that her second husband "lived in the shadow of his proud and wealthy wife: she, the daughter and widow of dukes, was determined that her husband's rank should correspond to her fortune." When the Montagu family title was given to the son of her younger sister, Lady Cardigan, she withdrew from court, and in 1776, when it was decided that the Duke of Montagu was to be created Earl of Montagu with remainder to his daughter, she claimed that had been promised this title for her husband. Lord North confirmed that he had given such a promise in 1772, but the king, George III, would not go back on his word. The Duke of Montagu waived his claim to the earldom, and Beaulieu was created an earl in 1784 but never received the title of Montagu.
