= Lord Lieutenant of Huntingdonshire =

Civil post in Huntingdonshire, England

This is a list of people who served as Lord Lieutenant of Huntingdonshire.

Huntingdonshire became part of Huntingdon and Peterborough in 1965; see Lord Lieutenant of Huntingdon and Peterborough. From 1672 until 1965, all Lords Lieutenant were also Custos Rotulorum of Huntingdonshire.

- William Parr, 1st Marquess of Northampton, 1549 –
- Henry Hastings, 3rd Earl of Huntingdon in 1581
- John St John, 2nd Baron St John of Bletso 8 April 1588 – 23 October 1596
- Oliver St John, 3rd Baron St John of Bletso 1 April 1597 – October 1618
- Oliver St John, 4th Baron St John of Bletso 14 March 1619 – 21 July 1627 jointly with
- Esmé Stewart, 3rd Duke of Lennox 14 March 1619 – 30 July 1624 and
- Henry Montagu, 1st Earl of Manchester 18 October 1624 – 1642 jointly with
- Oliver St John, 4th Baron St John of Bletso 5 February 1629 – 25 August 1636
- Interregnum
- Edward Montagu, 2nd Earl of Manchester 26 September 1660 – 7 May 1671 jointly with
- Edward Montagu, 1st Earl of Sandwich 26 September 1660 – 28 May 1672
- Robert Montagu, 3rd Earl of Manchester 7 May 1671 – 10 March 1681
- Robert Bruce, 1st Earl of Ailesbury 10 March 1681 – 20 October 1685 (in the absence of Edward Montagu, 2nd Earl of Sandwich)
- Thomas Bruce, 2nd Earl of Ailesbury 10 March 1681 – 8 April 1689 (in the absence of Edward Montagu, 2nd Earl of Sandwich)
- Charles Montagu, 4th Earl of Manchester 8 April 1689 – 20 January 1722
- Edward Montagu, Viscount Hinchingbrooke 14 February 1722 – 3 October 1722
- William Montagu, 2nd Duke of Manchester 25 October 1722 – 21 October 1739
- Robert Montagu, 3rd Duke of Manchester 6 November 1739 – 10 May 1762
- George Montagu, 4th Duke of Manchester 8 June 1762 – 4 September 1788
- George Montagu, 1st Duke of Montagu 7 May 1789 – 23 May 1790
- James Graham, 3rd Duke of Montrose 3 July 1790 – 14 March 1793
- William Montagu, 5th Duke of Manchester 14 March 1793 – 25 September 1841
- John Montagu, 7th Earl of Sandwich 25 September 1841 – 3 March 1884
- Francis Russell, 9th Duke of Bedford 16 April 1884 – 14 January 1891
- Edward Montagu, 8th Earl of Sandwich 17 February 1891 – 26 June 1916
- Howard Coote 6 September 1916 – 17 July 1922
- George Charles Montagu, 9th Earl of Sandwich 17 July 1922 – 28 January 1946
- Granville Proby 28 January 1946 – 9 March 1947
- Ailwyn Fellowes, 3rd Baron de Ramsey 30 July 1947 – 1965

== Deputy lieutenants ==
A deputy lieutenant of Huntingdonshire is commissioned by the Lord Lieutenant of Huntingdonshire. Deputy lieutenants support the work of the lord-lieutenant. There can be several deputy lieutenants at any time, depending on the population of the county. Their appointment does not terminate with the changing of the lord-lieutenant, but they usually retire at age 75.

=== 19th Century ===
- 2 July 1803: Sir James Duberley

== Sources ==
- J.C. Sainty (1970). "Lieutenancies of Counties, 1585–1642". Bulletin of the Institute of Historical Research (Special Supplement No. 8): 23–24.
- J.C. Sainty (1979). List of Lieutenants of Counties of England and Wales 1660-1974. London: Swift Printers (Sales) Ltd.
