= Robert Montagu (politician) =

British politician

- Died: 1693
- Father: Robert Montagu
- Relatives: Charles Montagu (brother); Heneage Montagu (brother)

Robert Montagu (died 1693) was a younger son of Robert Montagu, 3rd Earl of Manchester and Anne Yelverton. He was a knight of the shire from Huntingdonshire from 1689 until his death in 1693.

Parliament of England
| Preceded by Sir John Cotton, Bt; Sir Lionel Walden | Member for Huntingdonshire; 1689–1693; With: Sir Robert Bernard, Bt 1689–1690; John Dryden 1690–1693 | Succeeded by John Dryden; John Proby |
