= Anne Montagu, Viscountess Mandeville =

Viscountess Mandeville
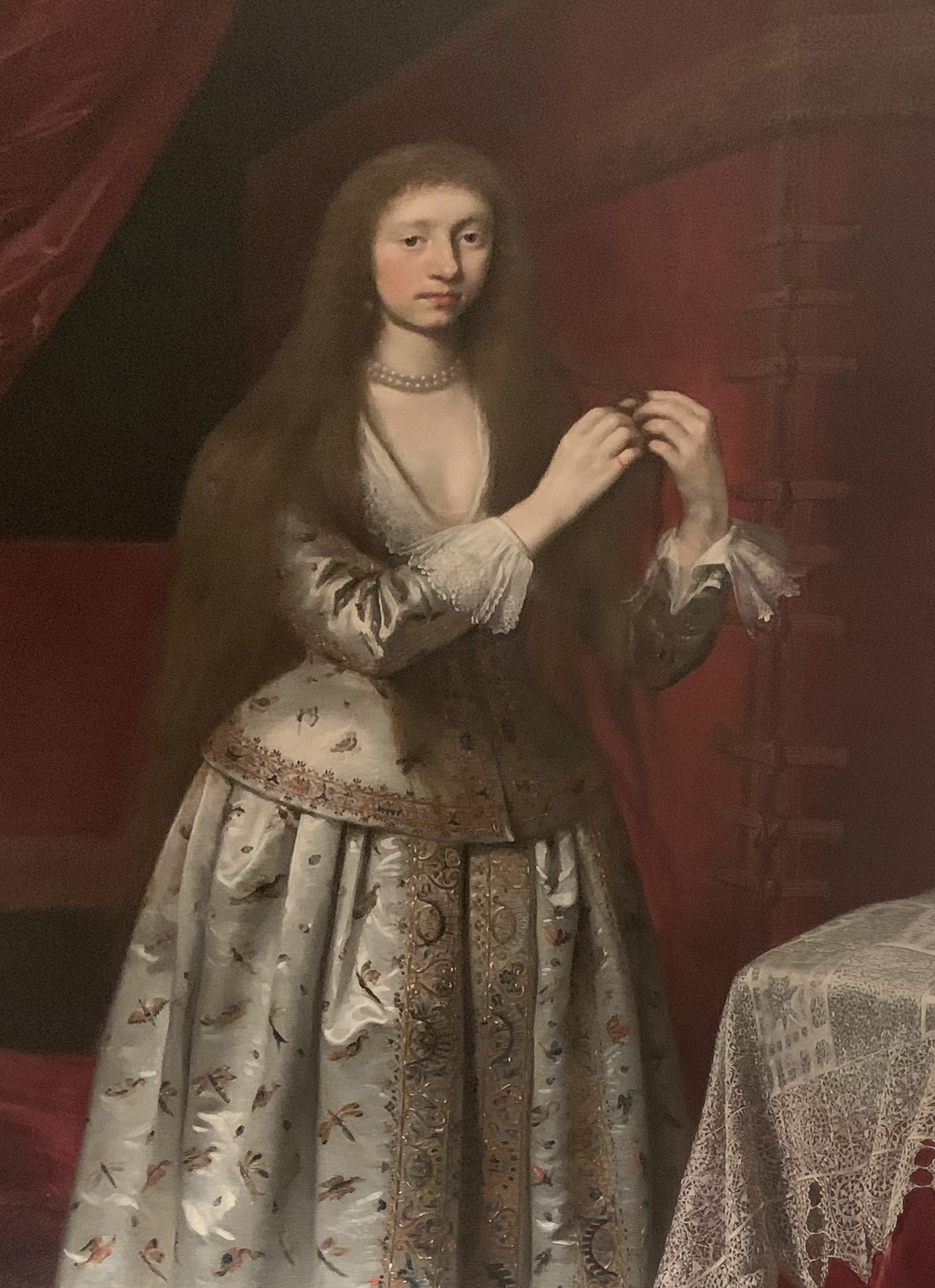
- Born: Lady Anne Rich; 1604; England
- Died: 1642 (aged 37–38); England
- Spouse: Edward Montagu, Viscount Mandeville (m. 1625)
- Children: 3
- Parent(s): Robert Rich, 2nd Earl of Warwick; Frances Hatton

Anne Montagu, Viscountess Mandeville (née Rich; 1604 – 14 February 1642), was the daughter of Robert Rich, 2nd Earl of Warwick, an English colonial administrator who opposed the policies of Charles I prior to the English Civil War. In 1625 she married, becoming the second wife of Edward Montagu, 2nd Earl of Manchester, a senior commander of Parliamentary forces during the English Civil War. She had three children by Montagu; her son Robert would later become the 3rd Earl of Manchester. Anne Montagu died a year or two before her fortieth birthday, shortly before the Civil War began.

== Early life ==
Anne was the daughter of Robert Rich, 2nd Earl of Warwick and his first wife, Frances Hatton. The Earl of Warwick was an English colonial administrator, admiral, and Puritan.

== Marriage and family ==
On 1 July 1625, aged around 21, Anne Rich married Edward Montagu, then Lord Kimbolton. This was Montagu's second marriage; he had previously been married to Susanna Hill, who died after less than two years without having any children.

In 1626, when his father was created an earl, Montagu became known as Viscount Mandeville. Through his wife's father, the Earl of Warwick, Montagu began to have Puritan sympathies and to oppose the policies of King Charles I of England. During the Civil War, Montagu became an important commander of Parliamentary forces. Viscount and Viscountess Mandeville had three children:

- Lady Anne Montagu (died 1689), who married Robert Rich, 2nd Earl of Holland, later also 5th Earl of Warwick, and had children
- Lady Frances Montagu, who married Henry Saunderson
- Robert Montagu, 3rd Earl of Manchester (1634–1682). Robert Montagu sat as a Member of Parliament in the House of Commons from 1660 until 1671 when he inherited his peerages and joined the House of Lords.

== Death and legacy ==
Anne died in 1642, shortly before war broke out between the King and Parliament., and just before her husband inherited the Earldom of Manchester in November 1642. Montagu married a further three times, his third wife being Essex Cheeke, who was Anne's second cousin; he had children by only one of his last three wives.

Anne's portrait was painted by Daniel Mytens, a Dutch artist born in Delft and trained in The Hague, who spend most of his career in England, where he became the lover of Charles I. The portrait is now held by the British Embassy at The Hague, part of the Government Art Collection.
