= Heneage Montagu =

- Born: 16 November 1675
- Died: April 1698 (aged 22)
- Father: Robert Montagu
- Relatives: Charles Montagu (brother); Robert Montagu (brother)

Heneage Montagu (16 November 1675 – April 1698) was a younger son of Robert Montagu, 3rd Earl of Manchester and Anne Yelverton. He was a knight of the shire from Huntingdonshire from 1695 until his death in 1698. He was also Captain of the Troop of Huntingdonshire Militia Horse in 1697.

Court offices
Preceded by Sir Francis Lawley, Bt	Master of the Jewel Office; 1696–1698	Succeeded by Charles Godfrey
Parliament of England
Preceded by John Dryden; John Proby	Member of Parliament for Huntingdonshire; 1695–1698; With: Anthony Hammond 1695–1698	Succeeded by Anthony Hammond; Robert Apreece
