= Sir Christopher Yelverton, 1st Baronet =

English politician

Sir Christopher Yelverton, 1st Baronet (27 March 1602 – 4 December 1654) was an English politician who sat in the House of Commons from 1640 to 1648.

Yelverton was the son of Henry Yelverton, a lawyer who became Attorney General for England and Wales, and his wife Margaret Beale, daughter of Robert Beale. He was a grandson of Christopher Yelverton, who was Speaker of the House of Commons. He was admitted as a member of Gray's Inn (1607) and Queens' College, Cambridge (1619), after which he spent several years touring Europe. He succeeded his father in 1630 and was appointed High Sheriff of Northamptonshire for 1639–40.

In November 1640, Yelverton was elected Member of Parliament for Bossiney in the Long Parliament. He was created a baronet, of Easton Mauduit in the County of Northampton, on 30 June 1641. Although not excluded under Pride's Purge he did not sit in parliament after 1648. In his last years, he is said to have been afflicted by melancholy and a deep consciousness of the sins of his youth.

Yelverton married Anne Twysden, daughter of Sir William Twysden, 1st Baronet and Anne Finch. The marriage was a very happy one. Their son Sir Henry Yelverton, 2nd Baronet inherited the baronetcy and sat as a Royalist in the Convention Parliament, and their daughter Anne married Robert Montagu, 3rd Earl of Manchester in 1665.

Parliament of England
Preceded by Sir Nathaniel Rich; Philip Fleming	Member of Parliament for Newport (Isle of Wight); 1626–1629; With: Philip Fleming	Parliament suspended until 1640
Preceded by Anthony Nicholl; Sir John Clotworthy	Member of Parliament for Bossiney; 1640–1648; With: Sir John Clotworthy 1640; Sir Ralph Sydenham 1641–1642; Lionel Copley 1647–1648	Not represented in Barebone's Parliament
Baronetage of England
New creation	Baronet (of Easton Mauduit); 1641–1654	Succeeded by Henry Yelverton
