= William Montagu, 2nd Duke of Manchester =

His Grace The Duke of Manchester KB

Lord Lieutenant of Huntingdonshire
- In office 1722–1739
- Preceded by: Viscount Hinchingbrooke
- Succeeded by: The Duke of Manchester

Duke of Manchester
- In office 1722–1739
- Preceded by: Charles Montagu
- Succeeded by: Robert Montagu

Personal details
- Born: April 1700
- Died: 21 October 1739 (aged 39)
- Spouse: Lady Isabella Montagu (m. 1723)
- Parents: Charles Montagu, 1st Duke of Manchester (father); Dodington Greville (mother)

William Montagu, 2nd Duke of Manchester, KB (April 1700 – 21 October 1739) was the son of Charles Montagu, 1st Duke of Manchester, and his wife, Dodington Greville, daughter of Robert Greville, 4th Baron Brooke of Beauchamps Court.

He married Lady Isabella Montagu, daughter of John Montagu, 2nd Duke of Montagu, on 16 April 1723.

He was made a Knight Companion of the Order of the Bath (KB) in 1725.

He died in 1739, aged 39, childless and his titles passed to his brother, Robert Montagu. Prior to his death the Duke was involved with the establishment of a new charity in London which would work to save children abandoned by their parents due to poverty and miserable conditions. The charity became known as the Foundling Hospital and its royal charter, naming the Duke of Manchester one of its founding governors, was awarded only four days prior to the duke's death.

Honorary titles
Preceded by Viscount Hinchingbrooke	Lord Lieutenant of Huntingdonshire; 1722–1739	Succeeded by The Duke of Manchester
Peerage of Great Britain
Preceded by Charles Montagu	Duke of Manchester; 1722–1739	Succeeded by Robert Montagu
