= Fruitland, Texas =

- Unincorporated community
- Location within Texas Location within the United States
- Coordinates: 33°29′54″N 97°47′38″W
- Country: United States
- State: Texas
- County: Montague
- Elevation: 1,050 ft (320 m)
- Time zone: UTC-6 (Central (CST))
  - Summer (DST): UTC-5 (CDT)
- Area code: 940
- GNIS feature ID: 1381900

Fruitland is an unincorporated community in Montague County, Texas, United States. According to the Handbook of Texas, the community had a population of 20 in 2000.

== Geography ==
Fruitland is located on Texas State Highway 101, 6 mi (9.7 km) southeast of Bowie in south-central Montague County.

== Education ==
Today, the community is served by the Bowie Independent School District.
