= Texas State Highway 101 =

State highway in Texas

State Highway 101
- SH 101, mainline in red, business route in blue

Route information
- Maintained by TxDOT
- Length: 25.559 mi (41.133 km)
- Existed: 1975–present

Major junctions
- South end: US 380 / SH 114 at Bridgeport
- US 81 / US 287 at Sunset
- North end: US 81 at Bowie

Location
- Country: United States
- State: Texas

Highway system
- Highways in Texas; Interstate; US; State; Former; Toll; Loops; Spurs; FM/RM; Park; Rec
← SH 100	→ SH 102

State Highway 101 (SH 101) is a state highway in the U.S. state of Texas that runs from Bowie to Bridgeport. It was designated along its route in 1976, running from Bowie southeast parallel to US 81/US 287 along a previous routing of those US Routes, then turning south toward Bridgeport along a previous portion of SH 114.

== Route description ==
SH 101 begins at an intersection with U.S. Route 81 on the far southeast side of Bowie, and travels southeast about 7 miles to Sunset. This section was the original routing of US 81 and US 287 before an upgraded routing was built for those routes. This section of SH 101 also remains within a mile of the upgraded US 81/US 287 along the entire route. In Sunset, the route turns to the south, departing from it parallel routing with the US Routes, and continues southward through Chico to its southern terminus on the north side of Bridgeport, where it meets U.S. Route 380 and SH 114. This section from Sunset to Bridgeport was a previous routing of SH 114 before it was redirected westward in 1976.

SH 101 has one business route, 101-B, through the city of Chico. The route was an original section of SH 114 before it was rerouted east of town in 1961. The old routing was then named State Loop 352. In 1991, the route was renamed to coincide with its parent, which had already been renumbered as SH 101.

== History ==
Historic SH 101

SH 101 was previously designated on February 17, 1925 on a route from Snyder to Colorado City. Another route from Georgetown east to SH 95 at Circleville was also designated on May 4, 1925. On March 28, 1927, the SH 101 from Georgetown to Circleville was renumbered as SH 104. As a result, there was only one SH 101 from Snyder to Colorado City. On November 30, 1932, SH 101 extended south to Sterling City. By 1936, the route was complete from Snyder to Colorado City, but was still an earthen road. By 1939, it was completed, with a terminus just west of Sterling City. The section north of Colorado City was transferred to SH 208 on February 23, 1956, with the remaining portion of the route cancelled and transferred to the northern extension of SH 163 on September 27, 1957. The current route was designated on its current path on November 25, 1975 to replace US 81 and US 287, which were routed onto a new built upgraded parallel path, and State Highway 114, which was moved to a different routing in the state.

== Major intersections ==
County	Location	mi	km	Destinations	Notes
Wise	Bridgeport	0.0	0.0	US 380 / SH 114 – Decatur, Runaway Bay	
Wise		4.5	7.2	Bus. SH 101 north – Chico	Southern terminus of Bus. SH 101
Wise		6.5	10.5	Bus. SH 101 south – Chico	Northern terminus of Bus. SH 101
Montague	Sunset	17.4	28.0	US 81 / US 287 – Alvord, Bowie	Diamond interchange
Montague	Sunset	18.0	29.0	Spur 511 south	Northern terminus of Spur 511
Montague	Bowie	25.5	41.0	US 81 – Sunset, Stoneburg	Diamond interchange
1.000 mi = 1.609 km; 1.000 km = 0.621 mi
