= U.S. Route 81 in Texas =

Section of U.S. Highway in Texas, United States

U.S. Highway 81
- US 81 highlighted in red

Route information
- Maintained by TxDOT
- Length: 81.458 mi (131.094 km)
- Existed: 1927–present

Major junctions
- South end: I-35W / US 287 in Fort Worth
- US 380 in Decatur; US 287 in Bowie; US 82 in Ringgold
- North end: US 81 at the Oklahoma state line near Ringgold

Location
- Country: United States
- State: Texas
- Counties: Tarrant, Wise, Montague

Highway system
- United States Numbered Highway System; List; Special; Divided; Highways in Texas; Interstate; US; State; Former; Toll; Loops; Spurs; FM/RM; Park; Rec
← SH 80	→ SH 81

U.S. Highway 81 (US 81) is a U.S. Highway that begins at an interchange with Interstate 35W/US 287 (I-35W/US 287) in northern Fort Worth in Texas. US 81 leaves the state and crosses the Red River into Oklahoma between Ringgold, Texas, and Terral, Oklahoma.

== Route description ==
US 81 begins at an interchange with I-35W/US 287 in northern Fort Worth. The two highways travel northwest as a freeway, passing by the Bureau of Engraving and Printing near Blue Mound Road (Farm to Market Road 156, FM 156), through the city's northwest side. US 81/US 287 leaves the city of Fort Worth and enters Wise County near Avondale. The highway runs through or near the towns of Rhome, New Fairview, Decatur, Alvord, and Sunset before separating in southern Bowie. US 81 runs through the town as Wise Street, running in a more east–west direction before turning in a more north–south direction at FM 174. The highway has a mostly rural route, running through western Montague County, before crossing the Red River into Oklahoma.

== History ==
US 81 at its inception in 1926 followed the route of State Highway 2 (SH 2), which began in Laredo and passed through San Antonio, Austin, Waco, and Fort Worth before passing over the Red River into Oklahoma four miles (6.4 km) north of Ringgold. The 1936 Official Map of the Highway System of Texas clearly shows the route labeled both as US 81 and SH 2. It was cosigned with US 83 for 18 miles (29 km) from Laredo to 2 miles (3.2 km) south of Webb, with US 79 for 18 miles (29 km) from Austin north to Round Rock, and with US 77 for 33 miles (53 km) from Waco to Hillsboro. In 1940 US 287 was extended south into Texas, and a 67-mile (108 km) stretch from Fort Worth northwest to Bowie was cosigned with US 81. The summer 1941 Texas Highway Map shows this pairing, and the current southern terminus of US 81 is still cosigned with US 287.

The spring and summer 1949 Texas Highway Department Official Map designates the length of US 81 from Laredo to Fort Worth as part of the National System of Interstate Highways, but no numeric designation was given at the time.

It was not until 1959 that parts of US 81 in Texas appeared on the Texas Official Highway Travel Map cosigned with I-35 shields. Succeeding maps reflect the slow completion of I-35 and I-35W over the stretch of US 81 between Laredo and Fort Worth, with the 1978-79 Texas Official Highway Travel Map showing only a 14-mile (23 km) section from Encinal north to 3 miles (4.8 km) south of Artesia Wells as incomplete, and the 1980 Texas Official Highway Travel Map shows that section completed. In 1980, US 81 was cosigned with I-35 and I-35W except where the Interstate bypassed towns; US 81 provided the main route through town and then reconnected with I-35 on the other side. The longest section of US 81 in 1980 not cosigned with the Interstate ran from I-35 in Hillsboro 20 miles (32 km) north to I-35W, just north of Grandview. This section of US 81 became SH 81 in 1991 when most of US 81 in Texas was decommissioned. The section of highway from Devine to Lytle became SH 132 and the section from Derby to the Pearsall town square became Spur 581 when US 81 south of Fort Worth was decommissioned in 1991.

== Junction list ==
County	Location	mi	km	Destinations	Notes
Tarrant	Fort Worth	0.0	0.0	I-35W south (US 287 south) / I-35W Express south	South end of US 287 overlap/freeway; I-35W exit 60
Tarrant	Fort Worth	1.5	2.4	Harmon Road (FM 3479)	
Tarrant	Fort Worth	3.1	5.0	FM 156 – Haslet, Blue Mound	
Tarrant	Fort Worth	3.9	6.3	Bonds Ranch Road	
Tarrant	Fort Worth	6.2	10.0	Blue Mound Road, Willow Springs Road	
Tarrant	Avondale–Fort Worth line	8.2	13.2	Bus. US 287 south / FM 718 – Newark, Saginaw	
Tarrant		10.3	16.6	Northstar Parkway	Northbound exit only; north end of freeway
Wise	Rhome	14.7	23.7	SH 114 east – Dallas	South end of freeway; south end of SH 114 overlap
Wise	Rhome	15.6	25.1	Bus. US 81 north / Bus. US 287 north / FM 3433 – Rhome	
Wise	Rhome	15.9	25.6	SH 114 west – Bridgeport	North end of SH 114 overlap
Wise	Rhome	16.8	27.0	Bus. US 81 south / Bus. US 287 south – Rhome	North end of freeway
Wise	New Fairview	19.0	30.6	FM 407 – Justin	Interchange
Wise	Decatur	27.7	44.6	Bus. US 81 north (Bus. US 287 north) to FM 2264 – Decatur	Interchange
Wise	Decatur	29.6	47.6	FM 730 – Boyd	Interchange
Wise	Decatur	30.7	49.4	Bus. US 380 / FM 51 – Weatherford, Gainesville	Interchange
Wise	Decatur	31.7	51.0	US 380 – Bridgeport, Denton	Interchange
Wise	Decatur	32.2	51.8	FM 1810 west – Chico	
Wise		33.3	53.6	Bus. US 81 south / Bus. US 287 south	
Wise	Alvord	40.4	65.0	Bus. US 81 north / Bus. US 287 north – Alvord	South end of freeway; no northbound entrance
Wise	Alvord	40.9	65.8	Hubbard Street	No southbound entrance
Wise	Alvord	41.9	67.4	FM 1655	
Wise	Alvord	43.4	69.8	Bus. US 81 south / Bus. US 287 south – Alvord	North end of freeway; southbound exit and northbound entrance
Montague	Sunset	48.5	78.1	Spur 511 – Sunset	South end of freeway
Montague	Sunset	49.7	80.0	SH 101 – Chico, Bridgeport	
Montague		51.5	82.9	Lawhorn Lane	
Montague		52.9	85.1	Fruitland Road	
Montague		54.8	88.2	Wagonseller Road	
Montague	Bowie	56.6	91.1	US 287 north / SH 101 – Wichita Falls	North end of US 287 overlap/freeway
Montague	Bowie	58.5	94.1	FM 1125 south / Mill Street	
Montague	Bowie	58.8	94.6	SH 59 (Mason Street) – Jacksboro, Montague	
Montague	Bowie	59.3	95.4	FM 174 west to US 287	
Montague	Stoneburg	67.2	108.1	FM 1806 west	South end of FM 1806 overlap
Montague	Stoneburg	67.7	109.0	FM 1806 east – Montague	North end of FM 1806 overlap
Montague	Ringgold	77.6	124.9	US 82 – Wichita Falls, Nocona, Gainesville	Interchange
Montague		78.4	126.2	Loop 19 west	
Montague		81.5	131.2	US 81 north – Waurika, Oklahoma City	Crosses the Red River into Oklahoma
1.000 mi = 1.609 km; 1.000 km = 0.621 mi: Concurrency terminus; Incomplete access

== See also ==
- Texas State Highway 81
- Texas State Highway 132
- Texas State Highway Spur 581
