= Gainesville, Henrietta and Western Railway =

American railway company

Overview
- Locale: Texas
- Dates of operation: 1886–1887

Technical
- Track gauge: 4 ft 8 1/2 in (1,435 mm) standard gauge

The Gainesville, Henrietta and Western Railway Company (GH&W) was chartered on July 23, 1886, to build a rail line from Gainesville in Cooke County, Texas, to Seymour in Baylor County, Texas, a distance of 130 miles (210 km). The line was to cross Montague, Clay, and Wichita Counties.

== History ==
Between Gainesville and Henrietta, only the town of Saint Jo existed. Other towns vied for access to the railroad, such as Montague and Seymour; however, land for the right-of-way was offered across northern portions of Cooke, Montague, and Clay Counties, and the railway produced new towns along the route, to include Myra, Muenster, Bonita, Nocona, and Belcherville, Texas. Construction began in 1886 with the establishment of section houses and depot buildings in Gainesville; it was hoped at the time that 50 miles (80 km) of line could be constructed and be serviced by passenger trains by February 10. (Note: A newspaper account in March 1887 of an 1886 report made by Missouri Pacific Railroad suggests that 66 miles (106 km) of line had already been built by the GH&W connecting Gainesville to Henrietta in 1886.) One hundred and fifty miles (240 km) of track had been completed by January 7. The line reached Saint Jo before the end of January. In May 1887, the Missouri Pacific Railroad assumed control of the GH&W.

The line was consolidated with several others to benefit the Missouri-Kansas-Texas Railway through Legislative act on April 16, 1891. At the annual meeting of stockholders held on May 6, 1891, F.M. Dougherty was elected president, R.D. Gribble vice president and J.L. Lindsay secretary and treasurer.

The town of Ringgold, also along the line, would develop after the crossing of the Rock Island line in 1892.

By 1900, the line had been extended, parallel to the Fort Worth and Denver Railway, into Wichita Falls, connecting to lines that ran to Abilene and into Oklahoma.

== Demise ==
The automobile and America's love affair with it brought the end to the small-town rail lines. In 1969, the line was abandoned with the exception of a small stretch near Wichita Falls. In 1971, the tracks were removed and sold for scrap metal. Many of the towns that developed along the line vanished long before the railroad, but others continue to prosper without it. Portions of the old right-of-way can still be seen in various places (between Henrietta and Nocona, particularly). On the eastern side of Henrietta, a U.S. Route 82 bridge over nothing still stands as a reminder of the Gainesville, Henrietta and Western Railway and its contributions to north-central Texas.
