= Texas State Highway 59 =

State highway in Texas

State Highway 59

Route information
- Maintained by TxDOT
- Length: 56.181 mi (90.415 km)
- Existed: before 1933–present

Major junctions
- South end: US 281 / US 380 / SH 114 / SH 199 at Jacksboro
- US 287 in Bowie; US 81 in Bowie
- North end: US 82 at St. Jo

Location
- Country: United States
- State: Texas

Highway system
- Highways in Texas; Interstate; US; State; Former; Toll; Loops; Spurs; FM/RM; Park; Rec
← US 59	→ US 60

State Highway 59 (SH 59) is a state highway that runs from Jacksboro to St. Jo in Texas.

== History ==
Historic SH 59

The original SH 59 was designated on August 21, 1923, between Palacios and Midfield, replacing SH 19B. On April 26, 1926, the highway was extended to the military camp west of Palacios. On November 15, 1927, the route was extended south to Tivoli (though this section was originally designated but unnumbered on October 10, 1927). On February 22, 1928, the route was extended south to Rockport, replacing part of SH 113. On March 19, 1928, this route was cancelled in exchange for extending SH 57 and rerouting SH 58.

On March 19, 1930, SH 59 was designated again between Bowie and Montague, with a proposed extension north to Nocona as a renumbering of SH 2F. On September 26, 1939, it was rerouted, so instead of going north from Montague to Nocona, it ran east from Montague to Saint Jo, replacing SH 175. The old route became new SH 175. On January 10, 1945, it was extended further south to near Jacksboro. On December 17, 1945, FM 454 from Bowie southwest 5 miles was cancelled and combined with SH 59. The final extension into Jacksboro was on October 1, 1968, over previous SH 24, which had been rerouted farther south.

== Junction list ==
County	Location	mi	km	Destinations	Notes
Jack	Jacksboro			US 281 / US 380 / SH 114 – Mineral Wells, Graham, Bridgeport	Southern terminus
Jack		9.3	15.0	FM 1810 – Cundiff	
Jack		20.4	32.8	FM 2127	
Clay	Newport	21.4	34.4	FM 1288 – Vashti	
Montague	Bowie	32.8	52.8	US 287 – Henrietta, Decatur	
Montague	Bowie	33.9	54.6	US 81	
Montague	Bowie	34.1	54.9	FM 1816	
Montague		37.0	59.5	FM 1758	
Montague	Montague	44.3	71.3	FM 455 – Forestburg	
Montague	Montague	44.6	71.8	SH 175 / FM 1806 – Nocona, Stoneburg	
Montague	St. Jo	56.2	90.4	US 82 – Henrietta, Gainesville	Northern terminus
1.000 mi = 1.609 km; 1.000 km = 0.621 mi
