= Capps Corner, Texas =

Unincorporated community in Texas, US

Coordinates: 33°48′02″N 97°30′28″W

Capps Corner is an unincorporated community in Montague County, Texas, United States.

The town is at the intersection of Farm to Market Road 1956, or "Hoosier Highway", and Farm to Market Road 677, 13 miles east of Nocona, eight miles north of Saint Jo, and six miles south of Illinois Bend in far northeastern Montague County. The settlement was established circa 1925 and named for E. G. (Cap) Adams. It was still listed as a community in 1990. Central to this small village was a "filling station" at the corner of the two farm roads, with "Capps Corner" written above the old-fashioned pumps. The store remained in business well into the 1980s; though it has since closed, it can still be seen there. The town also once boasted a small school until it consolidated with the Saint Jo Independent School District in 1961. The school can still be seen about one city block west of the old filling station. The population is less than 100.
