= Lake Nocona =

- Farmer's Creek Reservoir
- Location within Texas
- Location: Montague County, Texas
- Coordinates: 33°52′N 97°39′W
- Type: reservoir
- Built: 1959
- First flooded: 1960
- Surface area: 1,470 acres (595 ha)
- Max. depth: 80 feet (24 m)
- Water volume: 25,400 acre-feet (31,300,000 m^{3})
- Surface elevation: 827 feet (252 m)

Lake Nocona or Farmer's Creek Reservoir was begun in 1959 and completed in October 1960. It is formed by a dam on Farmer's Creek about nine miles (14 km) northeast of Nocona, Texas in northeastern Montague County and is owned and operated by North Montague County Water Supply District. The lake was constructed for municipal, industrial, and mining purposes. The elevation of the lake is 827 feet (252 m) above sea level; it has a capacity of 25,400 acre-feet (31,300,000 m^{3}), a maximum depth of 80 feet (24 m), and a surface area of 1,470 acres (595 ha). The drainage area above the dam is 94 square miles (243 km^{2}).

== Fishing ==
The lake is well stocked with largemouth bass - record 13.4 lb (6.078 kg) (1997), crappie - record 1.81 lb (0.821 kg) (1999), blue and channel catfish - record 13.13 lb (5.956 kg) (1995), and hybrid striped bass - record 11.3 lb (5.126 kg) (2005). Lake Nocona is classified as the fourth-best bass fishing lake in Texas. There is standing timber uplake and in Farmers Creek. Although amounts vary, this lake usually has around 100 acres (40 ha) of milfoil and 25 acres (10 ha) of floating pondweed, as well as many boat houses. These features furnish excellent cover for fish. Rip-rap along the dam provides excellent habitat for bass and sunfishes. In early spring and winter, big bass can be caught deep on rocky ledges off the face of the dam.

== Other Recreational Activities ==
Lake Nocona offers many recreational opportunities. Facilities include a marina, lakeside RV spaces and camping grounds, and three public parks with boat ramps and fishing piers. The three public parks are Weldon Robb, Joe Benton, and Boone. All are free public access and open year-round. Additionally, the city of Nocona has a July 4 fireworks show at Weldon Robb Park.

== Local towns and other areas of interest ==
Nocona, Texas; Capps Corner, Texas; Illinois Bend, Texas; Spanish Fort, Texas; Nocona Hills Country Club and Residential Community;
