= Hardy, Texas =

- Unincorporated community
- Location within Texas Location within the United States
- Coordinates: 33°34′35″N 97°31′14″W
- Country: United States
- State: Texas
- County: Montague
- Elevation: 984 ft (300 m)
- Time zone: UTC-6 (Central (CST))
  - Summer (DST): UTC-5 (CDT)
- Area code: 940
- GNIS feature ID: 1379888

Hardy is an unincorporated community in Montague County, Texas, United States. According to the Handbook of Texas, only six people lived in the community in 2000.

== History ==
The place was given the name Hardy in honor of R. Hardy, who built a sawmill there in 1880. There was a post office there from 1880 to 1916. Before 1885, Hardy added a steam-powered cotton gin and gristmill. The town had 103 residents by 1904, which was likely its largest population ever. Hardy's population fell to 25 by the middle of the 1930s and stayed there into the 1940s when no demographic numbers were available for several decades. As a result, rail lines bypassed the town. At the Hardy townsite, a cemetery may be seen on the county highway map from 1984. The population was six in 2000.

== Geography ==
Hardy is located on Farm to Market Road 1630, 12 mi (19 km) southeast of Montague in southeastern Montague County.

== Education ==
Today, the community is served by the Saint Jo Independent School District.
