= Nocona =

Nocona can refer to:

- Nokoni, one of the Comanche bands
- Peta Nocona, a Comanche chief
- Nocona, Texas, named after Peta Nocona
- a code name for a 2004 model of an Intel Xeon microprocessor

== See also ==
- Lake Nocona
