= Red River Station, Texas =

- Ghost town
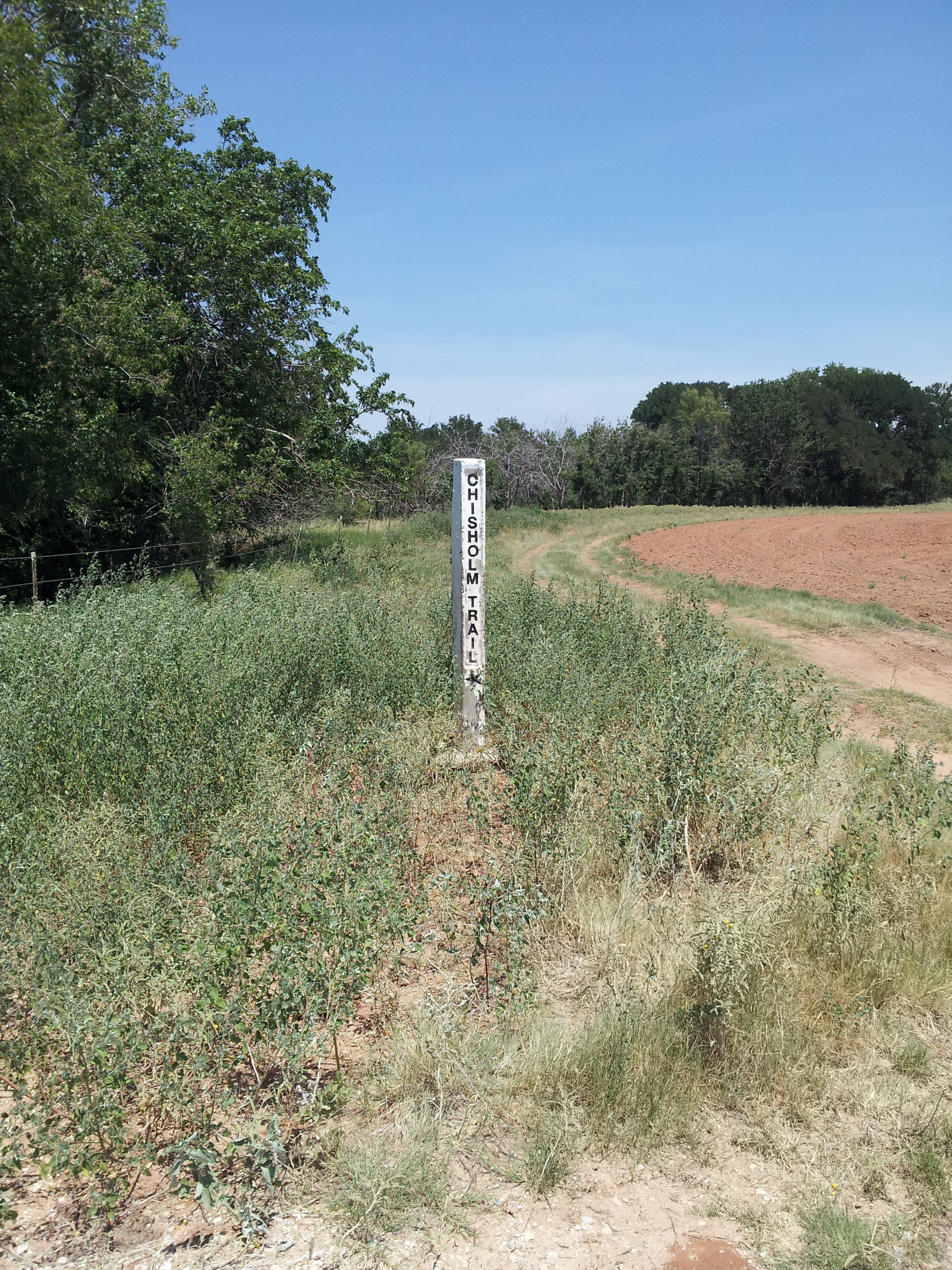
- Just south of the Red River

- Location within Texas Red River Station (the United States)
- Coordinates: 33°52′23″N 97°48′31″W
- Country: United States
- State: Texas
- County: Montague
- Settled: 1859-1860
- Founder: Pioneers
- Elevation: 842 ft (257 m)
- Time zone: UTC-6 (CST)

Red River Station is a ghost town south of the Red River at Salt Creek in northwestern Montague County, Texas, United States.

== History ==
Native Americans long used the fertile areas near the Red River for hunting. In 1859-1860, Americans began settling the area as the population of Native Americans dwindled. During the American Civil War, Confederate troops were stationed near Red River Station and patrolled along the south side of the Red River, the border between Texas and the Indian Territory.

In December 1863, a destructive Indian raid occurred, which spread from the Indian Territory, across the Red River at Red River Station, through Montague County, and into Cooke County, Texas. The Indians were between 200 and 300 strong, and massacred a number of settler families. They were chased by the Confederate military before disappearing back into the Indian Territory.

After the Civil War, cattle drives began moving from south and central Texas to Kansas, and Red River Station was the last stop in Texas on the Chisolm Trail. Virtually all cattle driven along the Chisolm Trail crossed at Red River Station. The town grew and citizens applied for a post office in 1873, initially naming it Salt Creek. In 1884, the post office's name changed to Red River Station, but the post office and the community were short-lived.

When the Gainesville, Henrietta and Western Railway (1886–87) crossed northern Montague County, its right-of-way crossed south of Red River Station, through present-day Nocona and Belcherville. As towns sprang up along the new rail line and with the end to the cattle drives, Red River Station faced extinction. A tornado also struck in the late 1880s, destroying much of the community. Rather than rebuild, citizens moved south to the communities along the new rail line and Red River Station again became farm land.

In 1887, the post office closed and the community ceased to exist. Today, nothing remains of the former community except the cemetery.

== Education ==
Red River Station is served by the Prairie Valley Independent School District.

== Historical landmarks ==
Red River Station received a historic marker in 1963 commemorating the settlement established on the Red River.

In 2009, a marker was unveiled for the Chisholm Trail.

Red River Station Cemetery is located west of Salt Creek and due south of the Red River.

=== Red River Station Cemetery ===
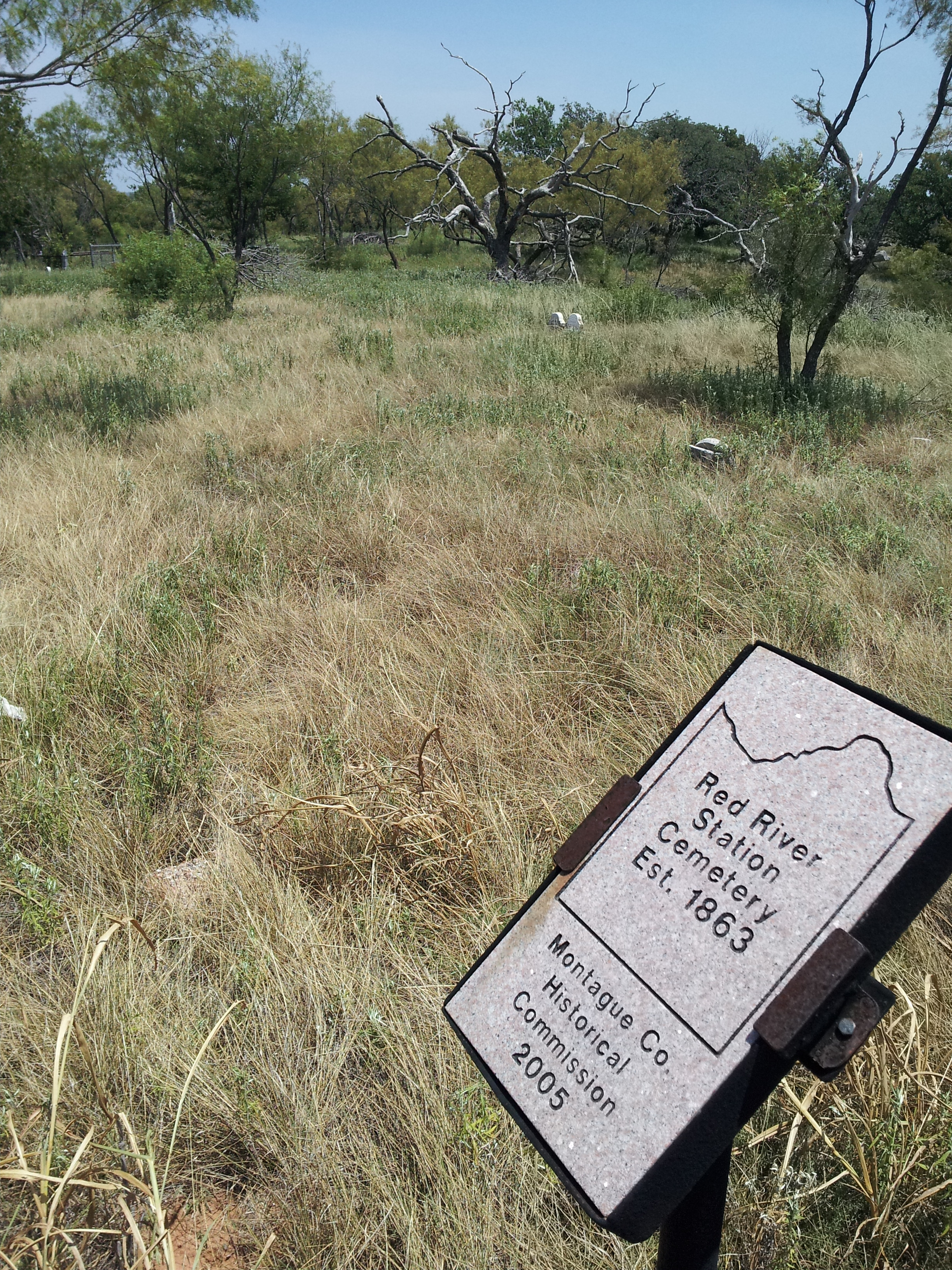

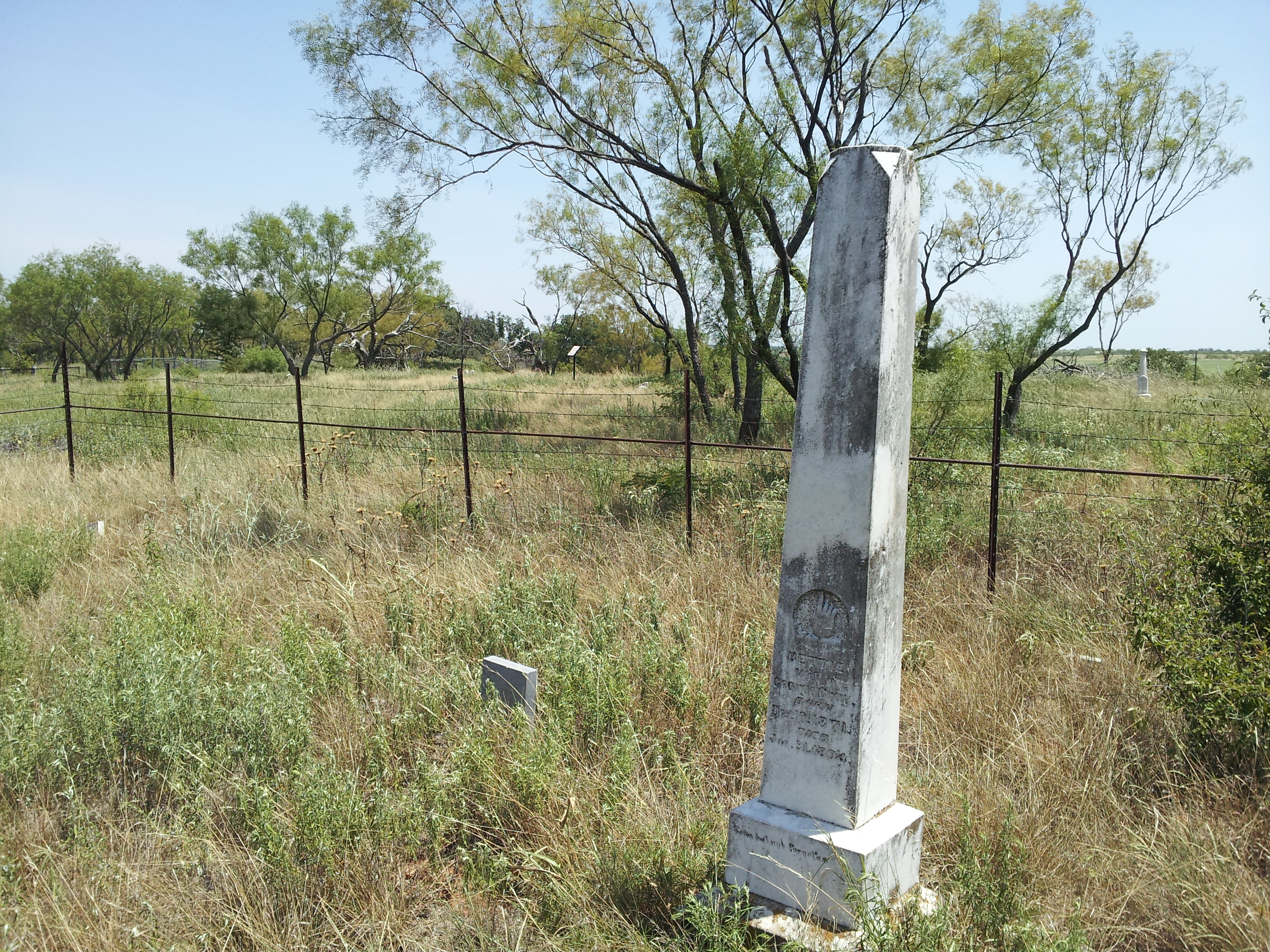

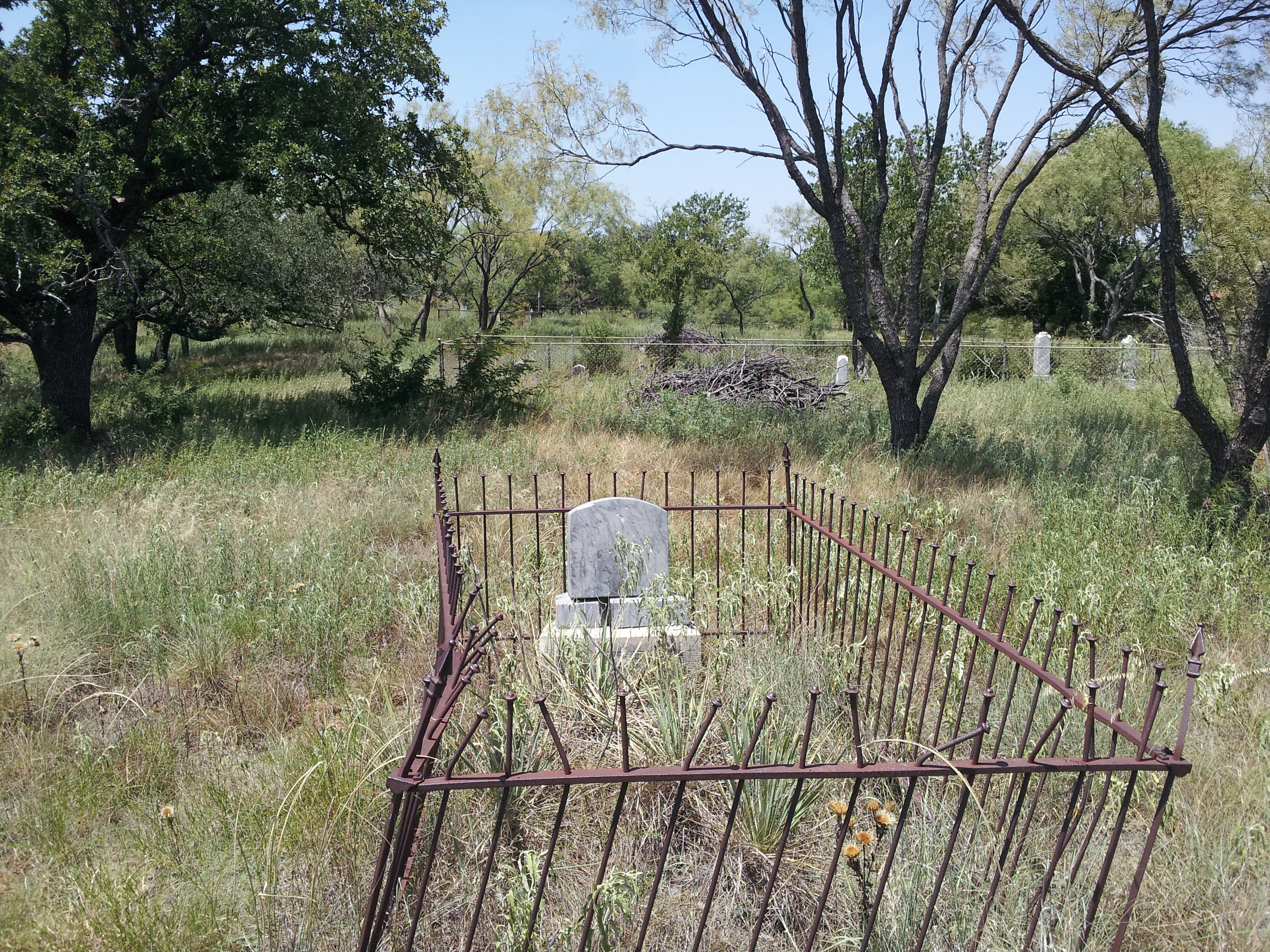

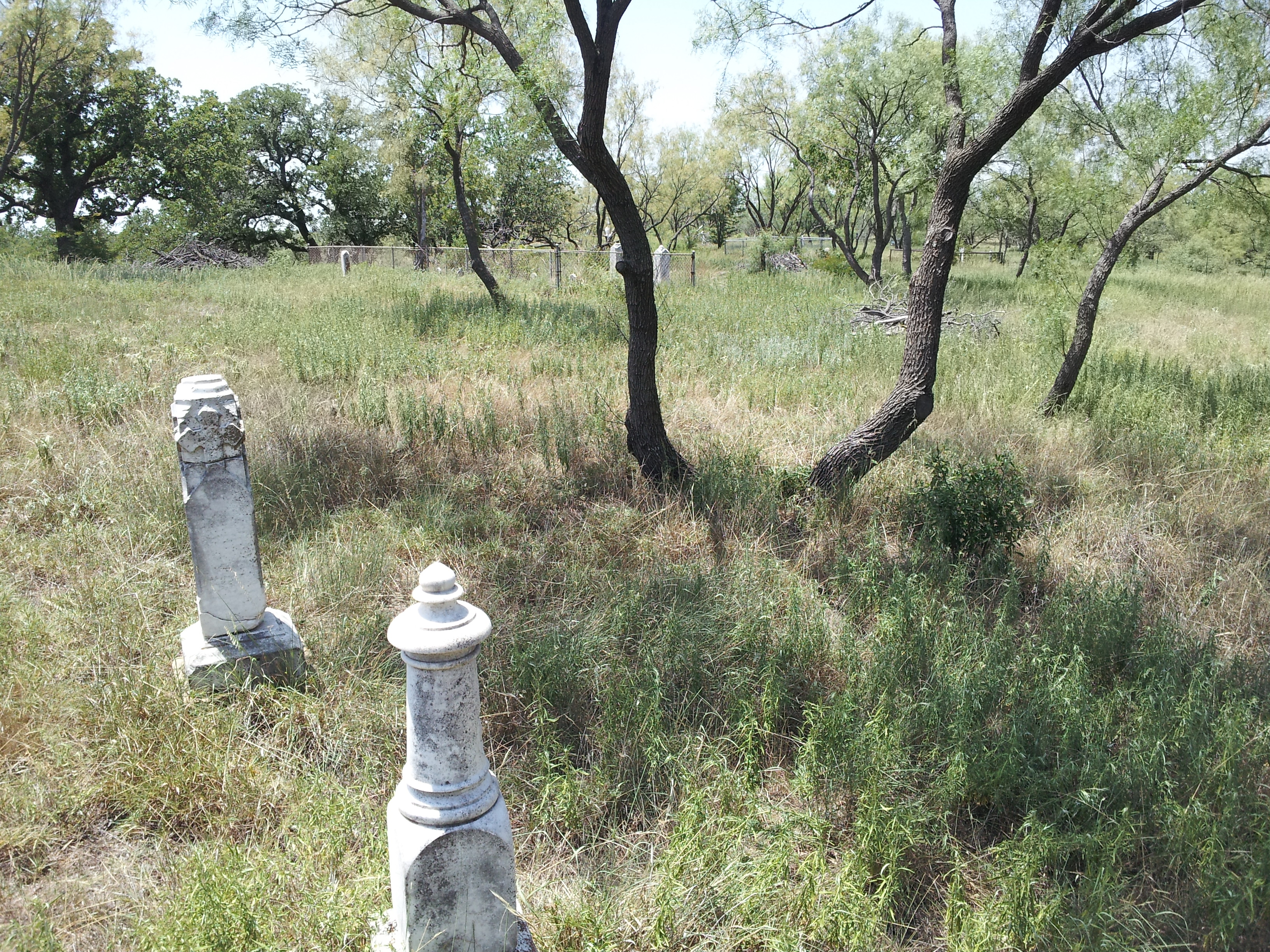
