= Bonita, Texas =

- Unincorporated community
- Location within Texas Location within the United States
- Coordinates: 33°45′32″N 97°35′40″W
- Country: United States
- State: Texas
- County: Montague
- Elevation: 994 ft (303 m)
- Time zone: UTC-6 (Central (CST))
  - Summer (DST): UTC-5 (CDT)
- Area code: 940
- GNIS feature ID: 1352658

Bonita is an unincorporated community in north-central Montague County, Texas, United States. According to the Handbook of Texas, the community had a population of 25 in 2000.

== History ==
Bonita was established in 1886 with the construction of the Gainesville, Henrietta and Western Railway through northern Montague County. It was most likely named for Bonita Hansen, an engineer's daughter, or the Spanish word bonita, due to the area's beauty. In 1887, Bonita received a post office. It became a shipping point for cattle and cotton in 1900 and had 300 residents. A bank was chartered in 1906. Fires and the construction of U.S. Route 82 from St. Jo to Nocona led to Bonita's demise. In the 1930s, it had a population of 218 and had seven businesses. By the 1950s, the population had fallen to 80 alongside three businesses, and the post office closed in 1967. Its population was 25 in 2000.

On March 26, 2009, an EF0 tornado struck Bonita, but there was no damage. On April 25, 1893, a possible F4 tornado struck Bonita. Nine homes were destroyed, two of which were leveled.

== Geography ==
Bonita is located on Farm to Market Road 1815, 9 mi (14 km) northeast of Montague in northeastern Montague County.

== Education ==
The Bonita area is serviced by the Nocona Independent School District.

== Notable person ==
- Wilcy Moore, pitcher for the New York Yankees and Boston Red Sox
