= Mallard, Texas =

- Unincorporated community
- Location within Texas Location within the United States
- Coordinates: 33°34′59″N 97°39′7″W
- Country: United States
- State: Texas
- County: Montague
- Elevation: 988 ft (301 m)
- Time zone: UTC-6 (Central (CST))
  - Summer (DST): UTC-5 (CDT)
- Area code: 940
- GNIS feature ID: 2034582

Mallard is an unincorporated community in Montague County, Texas, United States. According to the Handbook of Texas, the community had a population of 12 in 2000.

== Geography ==
Mallard is located on Farm to Market Road 455, 5 mi (8.0 km) southeast of Montague in southeastern Montague County.

== Education ==
Today, the community is served by the Forestburg Independent School District.
