= New Harp, Texas =

- Unincorporated community
- Location within Texas Location within the United States
- Coordinates: 33°27′9″N 97°34′22″W
- Country: United States
- State: Texas
- County: Montague
- Elevation: 938 ft (286 m)
- Time zone: UTC-6 (Central (CST))
  - Summer (DST): UTC-5 (CDT)
- Area code: 940
- GNIS feature ID: 1382383

New Harp is an unincorporated community in Montague County, Texas, United States. According to the Handbook of Texas, only eight people lived in the community in 2000.

== History ==
Nixon P. Harp, who opened a general shop nearby in 1879, was honored with the name. Up until around 1900, the community was known as Harp Town; thereafter, it was called Harp. There was a post office there from 1894 to 1905. Between the middle of the 1930s and the middle of the 1950s, the town's reported population peaked at 67. Thirty people called the town home in the middle of the 1960s, the last time it provided a population estimate. The population was eight in 2000.

== Geography ==
New Harp is located on Farm to Market Road 1655, 16 mi (26 km) southeast of Montague in extreme southeastern Montague County.

== Education ==
Today, the community is served by the Forestburg Independent School District.
