= Dye, Texas =

- Unincorporated community
- Location within Texas Location within the United States
- Coordinates: 33°37′14″N 97°36′45″W
- Country: United States
- State: Texas
- County: Montague
- Elevation: 1,181 ft (360 m)
- Time zone: UTC-6 (Central (CST))
  - Summer (DST): UTC-5 (CDT)
- Area code: 940
- GNIS feature ID: 1384230

Dye is an unincorporated community in Montague County, Texas, United States. According to the Handbook of Texas, the community had a population of 200 in 2000.

== History ==
It was settled around 1880 and the community grew up around J. D. Bybee's general store. From 1884 to 1905, a branch of the post office was located in Dye. Throughout its existence, Dye has been a hub for local farmers. Its documented population has never exceeded 60, and there have been no population estimates available since the late 1940s through the 1990s. Three residences and a chapel were nearby in 1961. There was a cemetery indicated on the 1983 county highway map. 200 people lived there in 2000.

== Geography ==
Dye is located on a spur off Farm to Market Road 3206, 10 mi (16 km) southeast of Montague in southeastern Montague County.

== Education ==
Today, the community is served by the Forestburg Independent School District.
