= Corinth, Montague County, Texas =

Corinth, Texas
- Ghost town
- Location within Texas Location within the United States
- Coordinates: 33°50′41″N 97°31′19″W
- Country: United States
- State: Texas
- County: Montague
- Elevation: 912 ft (278 m)
- Time zone: UTC-6 (Central (CST))
  - Summer (DST): UTC-5 (CDT)
- Area code: 940
- GNIS feature ID: 1379590

Corinth is a ghost town in Montague County, Texas, 12.4 miles (20.0 km) east-northeast of Nocona. The community never consisted of more than a community church, which served as a meeting place and school for the numerous farming families that lived in the north central Montague County area. In 1982, the old church collapsed after years of disuse. Nothing remains of the community.
