= Belcherville, Texas =

Belcherville
- unincorporated community
- Location within Texas Belcherville (the United States)
- Coordinates: 33°48′09″N 97°49′56″W
- Country: United States
- State: Texas
- County: Montague
- Time zone: UTC-6 (CST)

Belcherville is an unincorporated community in Montague County, Texas, United States. According to the Handbook of Texas, the community had a population of 34 in 2000.

== History ==
The town was originally known as Belcher, after local ranchers and landowners John and Alex Belcher, but by 1858 it had changed its name to Belcherville. The village, however, existed only as the Belcher Ranch's administrative center until 1887, when the Belchers bought 27,000 acres (11,000 ha) of land and laid up a townsite in anticipation of the Gainesville, Henrietta and Western Railway's extension through the area. That year saw the opening of a post office. Belcherville's expansion as a regional cattle and cotton shipping hub was aided by the train link and the nearby Red River Station's almost total destruction by a storm in 1890. More than twenty firms were operating there by the time it was founded in 1893. Belcherville had thirty companies and 305 persons by 1900. The municipality suffered over the twentieth century, and in 1908, locals decided to vote to rescind the charter of incorporation. Following World War I, two fires significantly damaged the local business district, and it appears that many businesses relocated to Nocona. Belcherville had 192 residents in the middle of the 1920s and 85 in the middle of the 1930s when five enterprises were running there. After 1930, the post office eventually shut down. The population of Belcherville then fluctuated, reaching ninety-four by the middle of the 1940s, dropping to thirty-one by the middle of the 1950s, and rising to ninety by the late 1960s, when there were no recorded enterprises. Since it was reportedly the smallest incorporated town in the United States in 1958, the municipality may have reincorporated in the first half of the 20th century. In the period between the 1960s and 2000, Belcherville's population was 34.

On February 10, 2009, an EF0 tornado struck Belcherville. It destroyed several outbuildings and two sheds, blew down a back door, and damaged the roof of one home. Two trees were uprooted and a water tank was flipped. Damages from the tornado were estimated at $20,000. Another EF0 tornado struck the town on May 15, 2013, causing damage to a ranch.

== Geography ==
Belcherville is located at the intersection of U.S. Route 82 and Farm to Market Road 1816, 15 mi (24 km) northwest of Montague and 6 mi (9.7 km) west of Nocona in northwestern Montague County.

== Education ==
Belcherville had two schools in 1900. Today, Belcherville is served by the Nocona Independent School District.

== Notable people ==
- Buron Fitts, 29th lieutenant governor of California.
- Foy E. Wallace, influential figure of the Church of Christ.
