= Texas State Highway 175 =

Highway in Texas

State Highway 175
- SH 175, highlighted in red

Route information
- Maintained by TxDOT
- Length: 8.493 mi (13.668 km)
- Existed: September 1939–present

Major junctions
- South end: SH 59 / FM 1806 at Montague
- North end: US 82 at Nocona

Location
- Country: United States
- State: Texas
- Counties: Montague

Highway system
- Highways in Texas; Interstate; US; State; Former; Toll; Loops; Spurs; FM/RM; Park; Rec
← US 175	→ SH 176

State Highway 175 (SH 175) is a state highway in the U.S. state of Texas that runs from Montague to Nocona in Montague County.

== Route description ==
The southern terminus of SH 175 is at an intersection with SH 59 and FM 1806 in the unincorporated community of Montague. The route heads north on a two-lane undivided road through rural areas before crossing into Nocona. In the city, SH 175 runs along Montague Street before reaching its northern terminus at US 82 in the center of the city.

== History ==
The original route was designated on August 3, 1932, between Montague and St. Jo. On July 15, 1935, SH 175 was cancelled. On August 1, 1936, SH 175 had a location survey created on it. On September 22, 1936, SH 175 was restored. On September 26, 1939, SH 59 was rerouted over SH 175, and the old route of SH 59 was renumbered as new SH 175.

== Major intersections ==
The entire route is in Montague County.

Location	mi	km	Destinations	Notes
Montague	0.000	0.000	SH 59 / FM 1806 west	
Nocona	8.493	13.668	US 82	
1.000 mi = 1.609 km; 1.000 km = 0.621 mi
