= Wilcy Moore =

American baseball player (1897–1963)

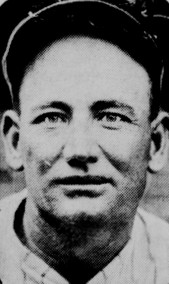
- Pitcher
- Born: May 20, 1897; Bonita, Texas, U.S.
- Died: March 29, 1963 (aged 65); Hollis, Oklahoma, U.S.
- Batted: Right Threw: Right

MLB debut
- April 14, 1927, for the New York Yankees

Last MLB appearance
- September 28, 1933, for the New York Yankees

MLB statistics
- Win–loss record: 51–44
- Earned run average: 3.70
- Strikeouts: 204
- Saves: 49
- Stats at Baseball Reference

Teams
- New York Yankees (1927–1929); Boston Red Sox (1931–1932); New York Yankees (1932–1933)

Career highlights and awards
- 3× World Series champion (1927, 1928, 1932); AL ERA leader (1927)

William Wilcy "Cy" Moore (May 20, 1897 – March 29, 1963) was an American professional baseball right-handed pitcher over parts of six seasons (1927–1933) with the New York Yankees and Boston Red Sox. He led the American League in ERA as a rookie in 1927 while playing for New York.

Moore was a member of the 1927 New York Yankees, frequently referred to as Major League Baseball's greatest team of all time. He made his MLB debut on April 14 of that season and proceeded to win 19 games, with Babe Ruth and Lou Gehrig among his teammates. Moore was the winning pitcher in Game 4 of the 1927 World Series, pitching all nine innings for the champion Yankees against the Pittsburgh Pirates. New York won the game in the bottom of the ninth inning on a wild pitch.

He also won the fourth and final game of the 1932 World Series, in which the Yankees defeated the Chicago Cubs.

Primarily a relief pitcher, Moore was a member of the Yankee staff during the 1928 World Series as well, but was not needed as the team's starting pitchers threw four consecutive complete games.

He was traded by the Yankees on November 21, 1929, and was reacquired by them on August 1, 1932.

For his career, Moore compiled a 51–44 record, with a 3.70 ERA and 204 strikeouts. In his two World Series, he went 2–0 in three appearances with a 0.56 ERA.

When scouted in 1926, Moore claimed he was 27, but records have proven that his actual age was then 29.

He was born in Bonita, Texas and later died in Hollis, Oklahoma at the age of 65.

== See also ==
- List of Major League Baseball annual ERA leaders
- List of Major League Baseball annual saves leaders
