= Nocona Hills, Texas =

- CDP
- Location within Texas Location within the United States
- Coordinates: 33°51′09″N 97°38′37″W
- Country: United States
- State: Texas
- County: Montague

Area
  - Total: 6.306 sq mi (16.33 km^{2})
  - Land: 5.205 sq mi (13.48 km^{2})
  - Water: 1.101 sq mi (2.85 km^{2})
- Elevation: 856 ft (261 m)

Population (2010)
  - Total: 675
  - Density: 130/sq mi (50.1/km^{2})
- Time zone: UTC-6 (Central (CST))
  - Summer (DST): UTC-5 (CDT)
- Area code: 940
- GNIS feature ID: 2586963

Nocona Hills is an unincorporated community and census-designated place in Montague County, Texas, United States. As of the 2020 census, Nocona Hills had a population of 637.

== Geography ==
According to the U.S. Census Bureau, the community has an area of 6.306 square miles (16.33 km^{2}); 5.205 square miles (13.48 km^{2}) of its area is land, and 1.101 square miles (2.85 km^{2}) is water.

== Demographics ==
Historical population
Census	Pop.	Note	%±
2010	675		—
2020	637		−5.6%
U.S. Decennial Census; 1850–1900 1910; 1920 1930 1940; 1950 1960 1970; 1980 1990 2000; 2010 2020

Nocona Hills first appeared as a census designated place in the 2010 U.S. census.

Nocona Hills CDP, Texas – Racial and ethnic composition Note: the US Census treats Hispanic/Latino as an ethnic category. This table excludes Latinos from the racial categories and assigns them to a separate category. Hispanics/Latinos may be of any race.
Race / Ethnicity (NH = Non-Hispanic)	Pop 2010	Pop 2020	% 2010	% 2020
White alone (NH)	624	552	92.44%	86.66%
Black or African American alone (NH)	5	3	0.74%	0.47%
Native American or Alaska Native alone (NH)	4	3	0.59%	0.47%
Asian alone (NH)	0	3	0.00%	0.47%
Native Hawaiian or Pacific Islander alone (NH)	0	1	0.00%	0.16%
Other race alone (NH)	0	3	0.00%	0.47%
Mixed race or Multiracial (NH)	6	34	0.89%	5.34%
Hispanic or Latino (any race)	36	38	5.33%	5.97%
Total	675	637	100.00%	100.00%
