= Illinois Bend, Texas =

- unincorporated community
- Location within Texas Illinois Bend (the United States)
- Coordinates: 33°52′54″N 97°29′14″W
- Country: United States
- State: Texas
- County: Montague
- Settled: 1862
- Founded by: C. M. Ward
- Elevation: 778 ft (237 m)
- Time zone: UTC-6 (CST)
- GNIS feature ID: 1379983

Illinois Bend is an unincorporated community in Montague County, Texas, United States. According to the Handbook of Texas, the community had a population of 30 in 2000.

== History ==
The community was founded in 1862 by a small group of people who relocated to Texas from Illinois. It was formerly known as Wardville after the local landowner C. M. Ward. When a post office was established there in 1877, the name was changed to Illinois Bend. The community had 300 residents, two gristmills, numerous cotton gins, and several churches in 1885. Due to rail lines avoiding the village, its population had decreased to 112 by 1910. In the late 1940s, when one business was there, there were 68 residents. Sometime around 1930, the community's post office was shut down. There were just 51 people living in Illinois Bend by the late 1960s. The population had decreased to thirty by 2000. It then went up to 40 in 2020.

Early settlers were plagued by occasional raids from Comanche and Kiowa Indians who had been placed in the Leased Lands north of the Red River and on the eastern border of the Chickasaw Nation.

On May 15, 2013, an EF0 tornado struck Illinois Bend. It damaged a home and downed several trees. Another tornado reportedly struck the community on March 20, 1955, injuring one.

== Geography ==
Illinois Bend is located on Farm to Market Road 677, 20 mi (32 km) northeast of Montague in the extreme northeastern corner of Montague County.

== Education ==
Illinois Bend had its own school in 1885. Today, the community is served by the Saint Jo Independent School District.
