= Ringgold, Texas =

Ringgold
- CDP
- Location within Texas Location within the United States
- Coordinates: 33°48′52″N 97°56′33″W
- Country: United States
- State: Texas
- County: Montague
- Elevation: 899 ft (274 m)
- Time zone: UTC-6 (Central (CST))
  - Summer (DST): UTC-5 (CDT)
- GNIS feature ID: 2805820

Ringgold is an unincorporated community in Montague County, Texas, United States. As of the 2020 census, Ringgold had a population of 146. It is approximately 20 miles (32 km) northwest of Montague, the county seat.

== Schools ==
Ringgold has one school, Ringgold Elementary School. Older students who live in Ringgold attend schools in nearby Stoneburg, where a consolidated school district (Gold-Burg ISD) has been established. Students may also opt to attend school in Nocona.

== History ==
The area around Ringgold was settled in 1892, when a land owner began selling parcels in the area where the Rock Island Line railroad built a line. The town was first named Harrisonia after the land owner, Joe Harris, but he renamed it Ringgold after his wife's family. A post office was established the same year.

As an intersection of rail lines, Ringgold became a market town for the immediate area, and it reached its highest population of around 400 in the mid-1920s.

On January 1, 2006, about half of the town was destroyed by a wildfire that burned 32 homes. The event prompted much Dallas/Fort Worth area media coverage.

== Demographics ==
Historical population
Census	Pop.	Note	%±
2020	146		—
U.S. Decennial Census; 1850–1900 1910; 1920 1930 1940; 1950 1960 1970; 1980 1990 2000; 2010 2020

Ringgold first appeared as a census designated place in the 2020 U.S. census.

=== 2020 Census ===
Ringgold CDP, Texas – Racial and ethnic composition Note: the US Census treats Hispanic/Latino as an ethnic category. This table excludes Latinos from the racial categories and assigns them to a separate category. Hispanics/Latinos may be of any race.
Race / Ethnicity (NH = Non-Hispanic)	Pop 2020	% 2020
White alone (NH)	110	75.34%
Black or African American alone (NH)	0	0.00%
Native American or Alaska Native alone (NH)	5	3.42%
Asian alone (NH)	0	0.00%
Native Hawaiian or Pacific Islander alone (NH)	0	0.00%
Other race alone (NH)	0	0.00%
Mixed race or Multiracial (NH)	13	8.90%
Hispanic or Latino (any race)	18	12.33%
Total	146	100.00%
