= Bowie Independent School District =

School district in Texas, United States

Location
- 341 US Hwy 287 North Access; Bowie, Texas76230 ESC Region 9 USA
- Coordinates: 33°33′23″N 97°51′1″W

District information
- Type: Independent school district
- Grades: Pre-K through 12
- Superintendent: Blake Enlow
- Schools: 4 (2009-10)
- NCES District ID: 4810990

Students and staff
- Students: 1,670 (2010-11)
- Teachers: 121.97 (2009-10) (on full-time equivalent (FTE) basis)
- Student–teacher ratio: 13.22 (2009-10)
- Athletic conference: UIL Class 3A Football Division I
- District mascot: Jackrabbits
- Colors: Maroon & White

Other information
- TEA District Accountability Rating for 2011-12: Academically Acceptable
- Website: Bowie ISD

The Bowie Independent School District is a public school district based in Bowie, Texas, United States. Located in Montague County, the district also serves the city of Sunset. Small portions of the district extend into Jack and Clay Counties.

== Finances ==
As of the 2010–2011 school year, the appraised valuation of property in the district was $603,249,000. The maintenance tax rate was $0.104 and the bond tax rate was $0.025 per $100 of appraised valuation.

== Academic achievement ==
In 2011, the school district was rated "academically acceptable" by the Texas Education Agency. Forty-nine percent of districts in Texas in 2011 received the same rating. No state accountability ratings will be given to districts in 2012. A school district in Texas can receive one of four possible rankings from the Texas Education Agency: Exemplary (the highest possible ranking), Recognized, Academically Acceptable, and Academically Unacceptable (the lowest possible ranking).

Historical district TEA accountability ratings

- 2011: Academically Acceptable
- 2010: Recognized
- 2009: Academically Acceptable
- 2008: Academically Acceptable
- 2007: Academically Acceptable
- 2006: Academically Acceptable
- 2005: Academically Acceptable
- 2004: Academically Acceptable

== Schools ==
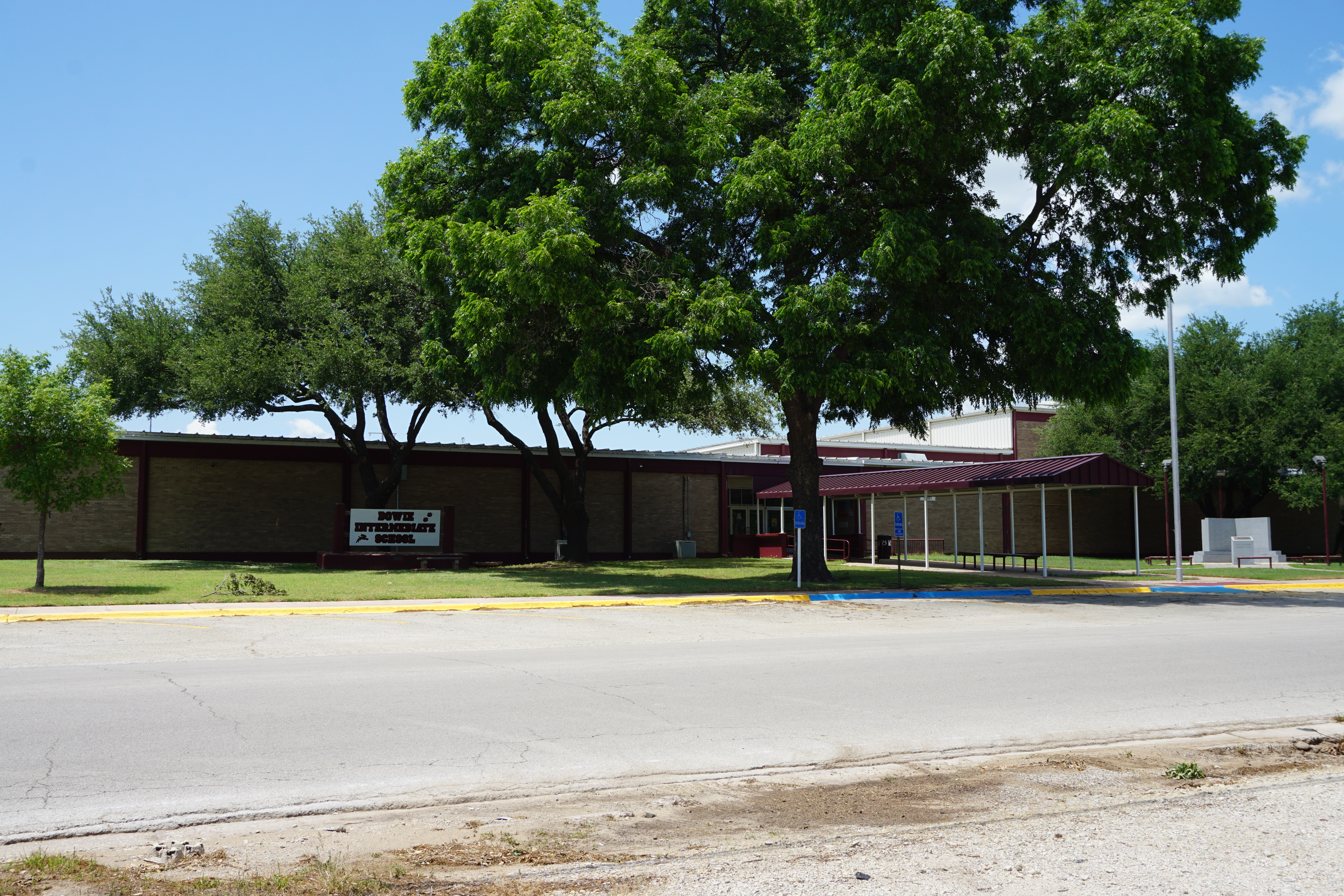
Bowie Intermediate School

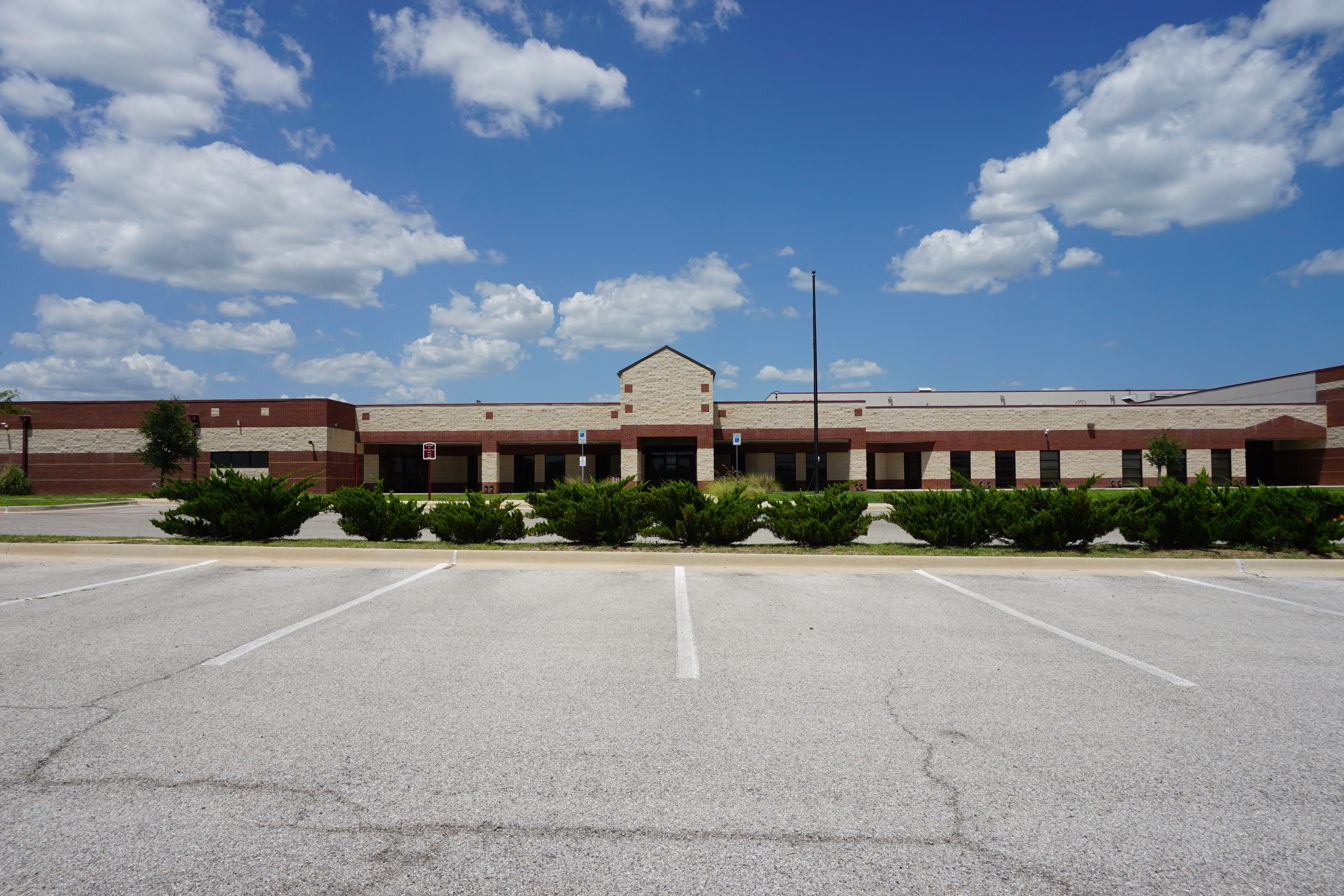
Bowie High School

In the 2011–2012 school year, the district operated four schools.

- Bowie High (grades 9-12)
- Bowie Junior High (grades 6-8)
- Bowie Intermediate (grades 3-5)
- Bowie Elementary (prekindergarten-grade 2)

== See also ==
- List of school districts in Texas
- List of high schools in Texas
