= Prairie Valley Independent School District =

School district in Texas

Location
- north central Montague County, TX ESC Region 9 USA

District information
- Type: Public
- Grades: Pre-K through 12
- Superintendent: Tim West

Students and staff
- Athletic conference: UIL Class A (non-football member)
- District mascot: Bulldog
- Colors: Blue, gold, and white

Other information
- Website: www.prairievalleyisd.net

Prairie Valley Independent School District is a public school district in north central Montague County, Texas (USA).

The district has two campuses - Prairie Valley High/Junior High (Grades 6–12) and Prairie Valley Elementary (Grades PK-5) - located in one building. Prairie Valley Elementary was a 2004 National Blue Ribbon School.

The district's name, school colors, and mascot were the result of compromises made in 1940 when the Prairie Point and Valley View schools merged (the latter is not the same as either of the currently existing Valley View districts in Texas, specifically the one in neighboring Cooke County). The name is a combination of the two former districts, the school colors (blue and gold) came from Prairie Point while the school mascot (the bulldog) came from Valley View.

In 2009, the school district was rated "exemplary" by the Texas Education Agency.

The district began a "flex Monday" program in fall 2021.
