= Montague County, Texas =

County in Texas, US

- County
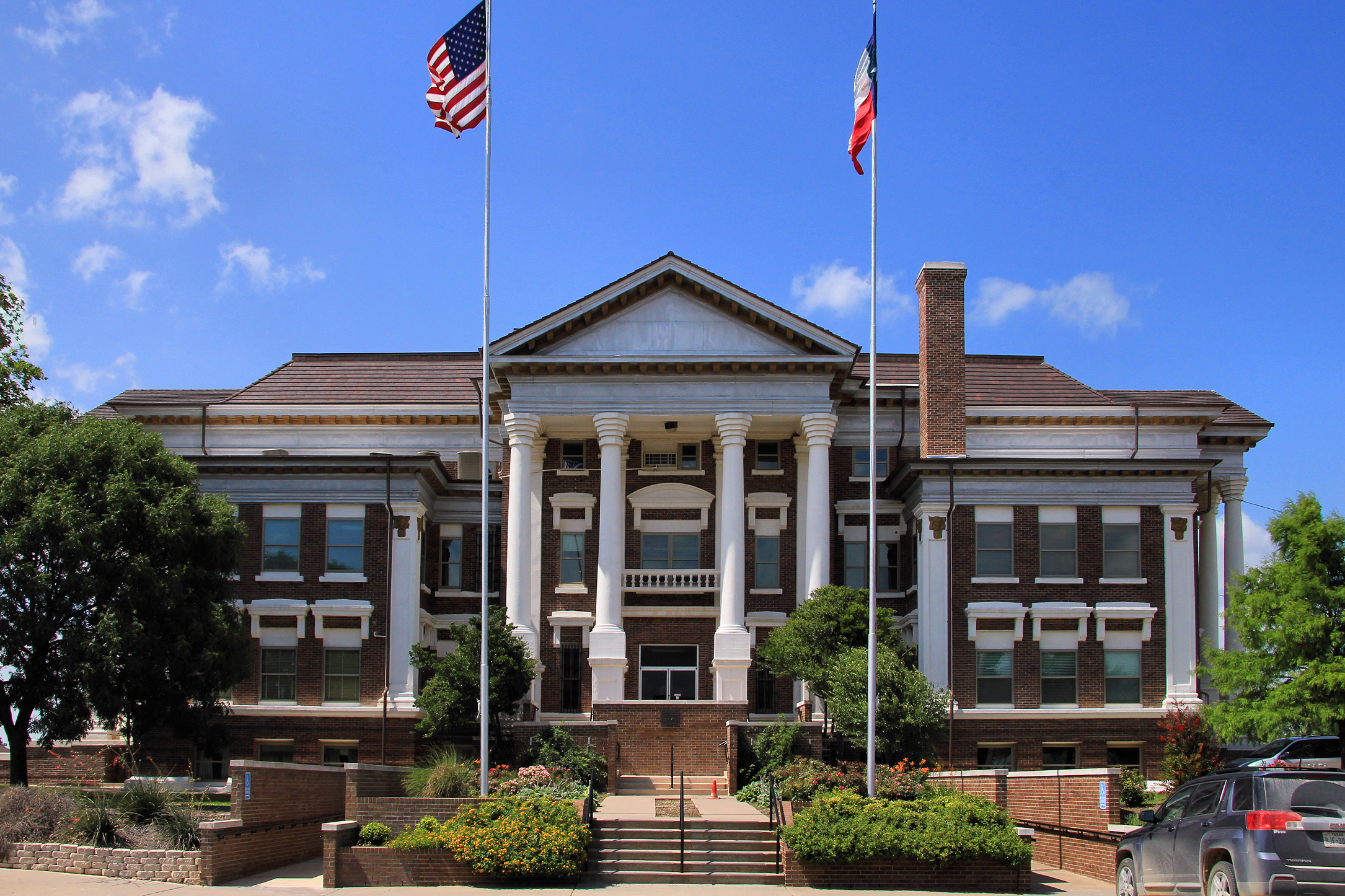
- The Montague County Courthouse in Montague

- Location within the U.S. state of Texas
- Coordinates: 33°40′N 97°44′W
- Country: United States
- State: Texas
- Founded: 1858
- Named for: Daniel Montague
- Seat: Montague
- Largest city: Bowie

Area
  - Total: 938 sq mi (2,430 km^{2})
  - Land: 931 sq mi (2,410 km^{2})
  - Water: 7.4 sq mi (19 km^{2}) 0.8%

Population (2020)
  - Total: 19,965
  - Estimate (2025): 21,966 ▲
  - Density: 21.4/sq mi (8.28/km^{2})
- Time zone: UTC−6 (Central)
  - Summer (DST): UTC−5 (CDT)
- Congressional district: 13th
- Website: www.co.montague.tx.us

Montague County (/ˈmɒnteɪɡ/ MON-tayg) is a county located in the U.S. state of Texas, established in 1857. As of the 2020 census, its population was 19,965. The county seat is Montague. The county was created in 1857 and organized the next year. It is named for Daniel Montague, a surveyor and soldier in the Mexican–American War.

== History ==
In the mid- to late 19th century, the county was the site of the trading post known as Red River Station, established near the river of the same name by Jesse Chisholm, a Cherokee merchant who also served as an important interpreter for the Republic of Texas and the United States. Together with Black Bear, a Lenape guide, he had scouted and developed what became known as the Chisholm Trail north through Indian Territory, where he had more trading posts, and into Kansas.

In the post-Civil War period, ranchers suffered from low prices for their beef cattle, as overproduction had occurred during the war, when their regular markets were cut off. Learning about high prices and demand in the East, they began to have their cattle driven to railheads in Kansas for shipment to the east. Red River Station became the southern terminus for the Chisholm Trail, and the gathering place for thousands of Texas Longhorns during annual cattle drives to railheads in Kansas. Over the years, an estimated five million cattle were driven north to Kansas. The cattle were gathered by cowboys from ranches in East and West Texas; the cattle were then driven overland north to Kansas. They were shipped east, where they could command much higher prices. After railroads were constructed into Texas, the cattle drives to Kansas ended.

== Geography ==
According to the U.S. Census Bureau, the county has a total area of 938 sq mi (2,430 km^{2}), of which 931 sq mi (2,410 km^{2}) are land and 7.4 sq mi (19 km^{2}) (0.8%) are covered by water.

=== Adjacent counties ===
- Jefferson County, Oklahoma (north)
- Love County, Oklahoma (northeast)
- Cooke County (east)
- Wise County (south)
- Jack County (southwest)
- Clay County (west)

=== National protected area ===
- Lyndon B. Johnson National Grassland (part)

== Demographics ==
Historical population
Census	Pop.	Note	%±
1860	849		—
1870	890		4.8%
1880	11,257		1,164.8%
1890	18,863		67.6%
1900	24,800		31.5%
1910	25,123		1.3%
1920	22,200		−11.6%
1930	19,159		−13.7%
1940	20,442		6.7%
1950	17,070		−16.5%
1960	14,893		−12.8%
1970	15,326		2.9%
1980	17,410		13.6%
1990	17,274		−0.8%
2000	19,117		10.7%
2010	19,719		3.1%
2020	19,965		1.2%
2025 (est.)	21,966	▲	10.0%
U.S. Decennial Census; 1850–2010 2010 2020

=== Racial and ethnic composition ===
Montague County, Texas – Racial and ethnic composition Note: the US Census treats Hispanic/Latino as an ethnic category. This table excludes Latinos from the racial categories and assigns them to a separate category. Hispanics/Latinos may be of any race.
Race / Ethnicity (NH = Non-Hispanic)	Pop 1980	Pop 1990	Pop 2000	Pop 2010	Pop 2020	% 1980	% 1990	% 2000	% 2010	% 2020
White alone (NH)	17,086	16,632	17,717	17,347	16,342	98.14%	96.28%	92.68%	87.97%	81.85%
Black or African American alone (NH)	2	4	28	38	73	0.01%	0.02%	0.15%	0.19%	0.37%
Native American or Alaska Native alone (NH)	68	71	123	137	155	0.39%	0.41%	0.64%	0.69%	0.78%
Asian alone (NH)	10	13	49	59	84	0.06%	0.08%	0.26%	0.30%	0.42%
Native Hawaiian or Pacific Islander alone (NH)	x	x	3	3	4	x	x	0.02%	0.02%	0.02%
Other race alone (NH)	5	6	2	3	34	0.03%	0.03%	0.01%	0.02%	0.17%
Mixed race or Multiracial (NH)	x	x	160	202	912	x	x	0.84%	1.02%	4.57%
Hispanic or Latino (any race)	239	548	1,035	1,930	2,361	1.37%	3.17%	5.41%	9.79%	11.83%
Total	17,410	17,274	19,117	19,719	19,965	100.00%	100.00%	100.00%	100.00%	100.00%

=== 2020 census ===
As of the 2020 census, the county had a population of 19,965, a median age of 45.1 years, 22.1% of residents under the age of 18, and 23.1% aged 65 years or older. For every 100 females there were 96.8 males, and for every 100 females age 18 and over there were 95.3 males age 18 and over.

The racial makeup of the county as of the 2020 census was 85.5% White, 0.4% Black or African American, 1.0% American Indian and Alaska Native, 0.4% Asian, <0.1% Native Hawaiian and Pacific Islander, 3.6% from some other race, and 9.1% from two or more races. Hispanic or Latino residents of any race comprised 11.8% of the population.

As of the 2020 census, 27.1% of residents lived in urban areas while 72.9% lived in rural areas.

As of the 2020 census, there were 8,112 households in the county, of which 28.0% had children under the age of 18 living in them. Of all households, 51.8% were married-couple households, 18.7% were households with a male householder and no spouse or partner present, and 23.8% were households with a female householder and no spouse or partner present. About 28.4% of all households were made up of individuals and 15.3% had someone living alone who was 65 years of age or older.

As of the 2020 census there were 10,248 housing units, of which 20.8% were vacant. Among occupied housing units, 75.8% were owner-occupied and 24.2% were renter-occupied. The homeowner vacancy rate was 2.6% and the rental vacancy rate was 10.8%.

=== 2000 census ===
As of the 2000 census, 19,117 people, 7,770 households, and 5,485 families were residing in the county. The population density was 20 people/mi^{2} (7.7 people/km^{2}). The 9,862 housing units averaged 11 per square mile (4.2/km^{2}). The racial makeup of the county was 95.95% White, 0.18% African American, 0.74% Native American, 0.26% Asian, 1.67% from other races, and 1.21% from two or more races. About 5.41% of the population was Hispanic or Latino of any race.

Of the 7,770 households, 28.70% had children under the age of 18 living with them, 58.10% were married couples living together, 8.80% had a female householder with no husband present, and 29.40% were not families. About 27.10% of all households were made up of individuals, and 14.70% had someone living alone who was 65 years of age or older. The average household size was 2.41, and the average family size was 2.91.

In the county, the age distribution was 24.00% under 18, 6.80% from 18 to 24, 24.30% from 25 to 44, 25.10% from 45 to 64, and 19.80% who were 65 or older. The median age was 41 years. For every 100 females, there were 92.50 males. For every 100 females age 18 and over, there were 89.80 males.

The median income for a household in the county was $31,048, and for a family was $38,226. Males had a median income of $31,585 versus $19,589 for females. The per capita income for the county was $17,115. About 10.00% of families and 14.00% of the population were below the poverty line, including 17.80% of those under age 18 and 11.90% of those age 65 or over.

== Education ==
These school districts serve Montague County:

- Alvord ISD (mostly in Wise County)
- Bowie ISD (small portion in Clay, Jack Counties)
- Forestburg ISD
- Gold-Burg ISD (small portion in Clay County)
- Montague ISD
- Nocona ISD
- Prairie Valley ISD
- Saint Jo ISD (small portion in Cooke County)
- Slidell ISD (partly in Wise, Denton counties; small portion in Cooke County)

In addition, a branch of North Central Texas College operates in Bowie.

== Transportation ==
=== Major highways ===
- U.S. Highway 81
- U.S. Highway 82
- U.S. Highway 287
- State Highway 59
- State Highway 101
- State Highway 175
- Loop 19
  - Spur 19
- Spur 511

=== Farm to Market Roads ===
- FM 103
- FM 174
- FM 455
- FM 677
- FM 730
- FM 922
- FM 1106
- FM 1125
- FM 1630
- FM 1655
- FM 1749
- FM 1758
- FM 1759
- FM 1806
- FM 1815
- FM 1816
- FM 1956
- FM 2382
- FM 2634
- FM 2849
- FM 2953
- FM 3043
- FM 3301
- FM 3394
- FM 3428

== Communities ==
=== Cities ===
- Bowie (largest city)
- Nocona
- St. Jo

=== Census-designated places ===
- Montague (county seat)
- Nocona Hills
- Ringgold
- Sunset

=== Other unincorporated communities ===
- Belcherville
- Bonita
- Dye
- Forestburg
- Fruitland
- Hardy
- Illinois Bend
- Mallard
- New Harp
- Spanish Fort
- Stoneburg

=== Ghost towns ===
- Capps Corner
- Corinth
- Gladys
- Hynds City
- Red River Station
- Rowland
- Salona

== Politics ==
Republican Drew Springer, a businessman from Muenster in Cooke County, represents Montague County in the Texas House of Representatives. He carried the county in the 2012 Republican runoff election.

Prior to 1996, Montague County was strongly Democratic in presidential elections. The only Republican Party candidates who managed to win the county from 1912 to 1992 were Herbert Hoover in 1928 and Richard Nixon and Ronald Reagan in their 49-state landslides of 1972 and 1984, respectively. Since 1996, the county has swung hard to the supporting Republican Party, in similar fashion to almost all white-majority rural counties in the Solid South.

Montague County is located within District 68 of the Texas House of Representatives. Montague County is located within District 30 of the Texas Senate.

United States presidential election results for Montague County, Texas
Year	Republican		Democratic		Third party(ies)	
Year	No.	%	No.	%	No.	%
1912	151	7.04%	1,531	71.34%	464	21.62%
1916	245	10.68%	1,803	78.56%	247	10.76%
1920	474	19.79%	1,714	71.57%	207	8.64%
1924	586	17.93%	2,236	68.40%	447	13.67%
1928	1,519	51.13%	1,452	48.87%	0	0.00%
1932	262	7.75%	3,090	91.39%	29	0.86%
1936	324	10.36%	2,789	89.16%	15	0.48%
1940	530	13.63%	3,352	86.21%	6	0.15%
1944	429	11.56%	2,900	78.17%	381	10.27%
1948	475	13.35%	2,872	80.74%	210	5.90%
1952	2,367	43.97%	3,012	55.95%	4	0.07%
1956	2,003	45.81%	2,358	53.93%	11	0.25%
1960	2,101	47.05%	2,346	52.54%	18	0.40%
1964	1,106	22.78%	3,746	77.14%	4	0.08%
1968	1,736	33.35%	2,555	49.09%	914	17.56%
1972	3,463	72.63%	1,286	26.97%	19	0.40%
1976	2,182	34.67%	4,087	64.93%	25	0.40%
1980	3,143	48.56%	3,233	49.95%	96	1.48%
1984	4,406	62.67%	2,602	37.01%	22	0.31%
1988	3,475	48.36%	3,689	51.34%	22	0.31%
1992	2,304	30.61%	2,885	38.33%	2,337	31.05%
1996	3,029	45.71%	2,718	41.02%	879	13.27%
2000	4,951	67.54%	2,256	30.78%	123	1.68%
2004	5,910	74.84%	1,946	24.64%	41	0.52%
2008	6,245	78.55%	1,597	20.09%	108	1.36%
2012	6,549	84.49%	1,116	14.40%	86	1.11%
2016	7,526	87.47%	885	10.29%	193	2.24%
2020	8,615	87.62%	1,097	11.16%	120	1.22%
2024	9,825	88.51%	1,208	10.88%	68	0.61%

United States Senate election results for Montague County, Texas1
Year	Republican		Democratic		Third party(ies)	
Year	No.	%	No.	%	No.	%
2024	9,489	86.15%	1,353	12.28%	172	1.56%

United States Senate election results for Montague County, Texas2
Year	Republican		Democratic		Third party(ies)	
Year	No.	%	No.	%	No.	%
2020	8,526	87.37%	1,051	10.77%	182	1.86%

Texas Gubernatorial election results for Montague County
Year	Republican		Democratic		Third party(ies)	
Year	No.	%	No.	%	No.	%
2022	7,004	89.17%	765	9.74%	86	1.09%

== See also ==
- National Register of Historic Places listings in Montague County, Texas
- Recorded Texas Historic Landmarks in Montague County
- Buford T. Justice
