= Stoneburg, Texas =

- Unincorporated community
- Location within Texas Location within the United States
- Coordinates: 33°40′16″N 97°54′19″W
- Country: United States
- State: Texas
- County: Montague
- Elevation: 938 ft (286 m)
- Time zone: UTC-6 (Central (CST))
  - Summer (DST): UTC-5 (CDT)
- Area code: 940
- GNIS feature ID: 1369240

Stoneburg is an unincorporated community in Montague County, Texas, United States. According to the Handbook of Texas, it had a population of approximately 51 in 2000.

== History ==
In April 1958, an F3 tornado struck Stoneburg, injuring one person. On May 18, 1946, an F4 tornado struck Stoneburg. On April 29, 1906, another tornado hit Stoneburg. On April 9, 2009, Stoneburg was destroyed in a wildfire.

Convicted murderer Henry Lee Lucas was picked up by a Pentecostal minister from the House of Prayer in Stoneburg while hitchhiking.

== Geography ==
Stoneburg sits at the intersection of U.S. Route 81 and Farm to Market Road 1806, 15 mi (24 km) west of Montague and 12 mi (19 km) north of Bowie in west-central Montague County. Bowie Lake is 2 miles (3.2 km) southwest of the town.

== Education ==
W.T. Small used his ranch as a school in 1883. The Gold-Burg Independent School District serves area students.
