= Sunset, Montague County, Texas =

Sunset, Texas
- census-designated place
- Location of Sunset, Texas

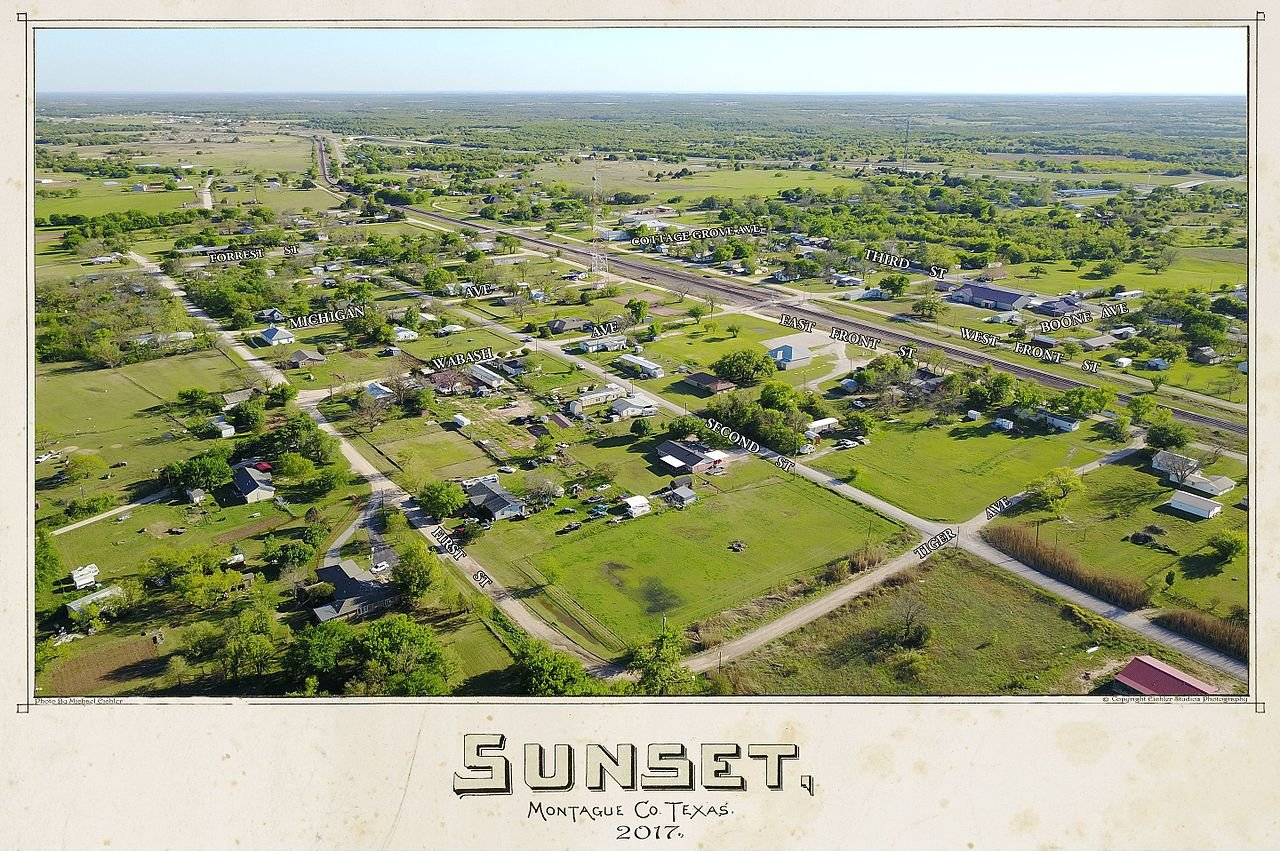
- Aerial of Sunset in 2017 - Michael Eichler
- Coordinates: 33°26′58″N 97°45′32″W
- Country: United States
- State: Texas
- County: Montague

Area
  - Total: 1.1 sq mi (2.8 km^{2})
  - Land: 1.1 sq mi (2.8 km^{2})
  - Water: 0 sq mi (0.0 km^{2})
- Elevation: 988 ft (301 m)

Population (2020)
  - Total: 543
  - Density: 500/sq mi (190/km^{2})
- Time zone: UTC-6 (Central (CST))
  - Summer (DST): UTC-5 (CDT)
- ZIP code: 76270
- Area code: 940
- FIPS code: 48-71264
- GNIS feature ID: 2586993

Sunset is an unincorporated community in Montague County, Texas, United States. Until 1900, a surveying error had placed the community in Wise County. The Fort Worth and Denver Railway runs through Sunset. The population was 339 at the 2000 census. The city disincorporated on April 19, 2007.

== History ==
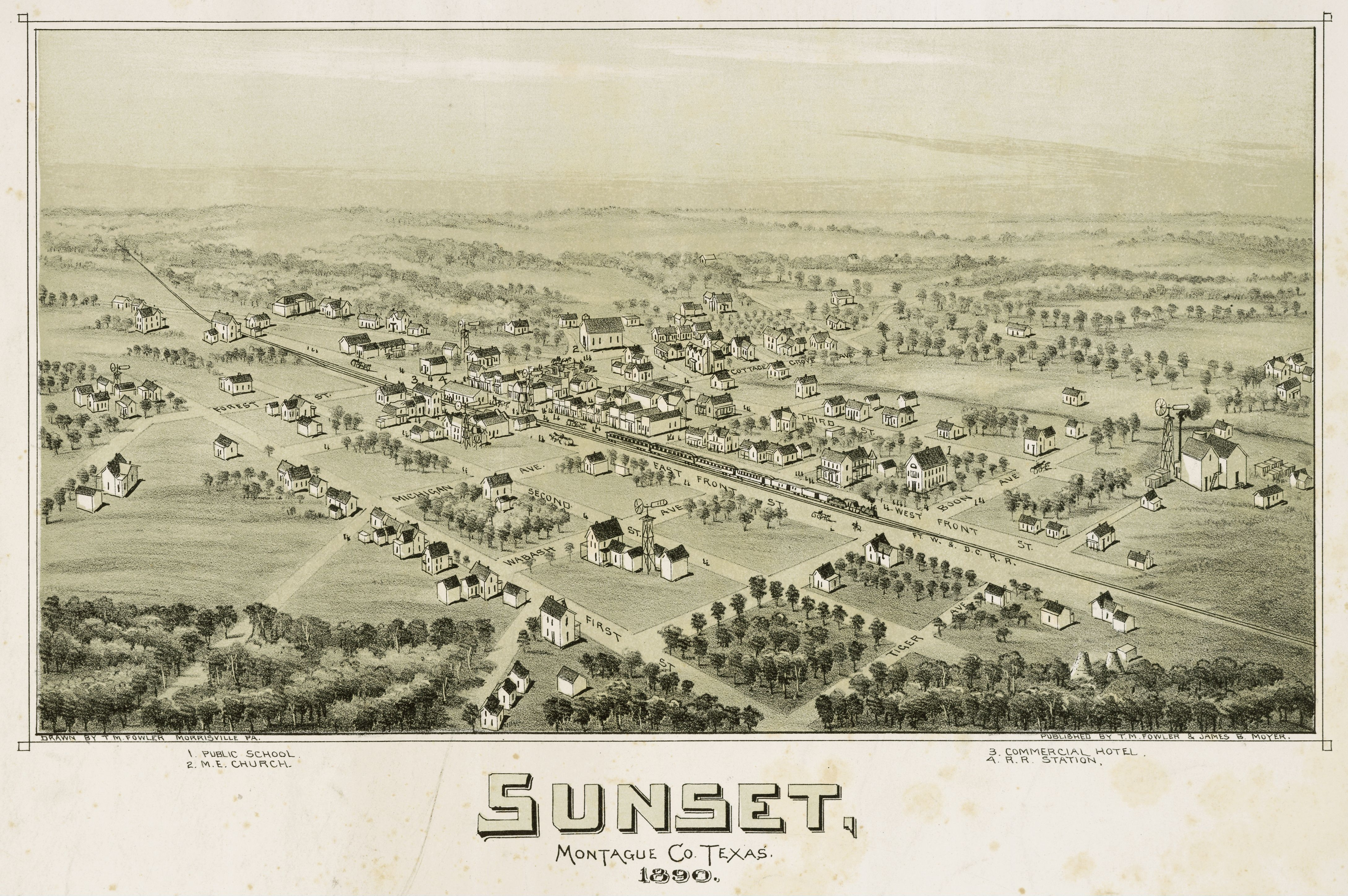
Sunset T.M. Fowler 1890

=== 2009 wildfires ===
On April 9, 2009, the community was evacuated in advance of approaching wildfires. The fires ripped through the town in "patchwork fashion", destroying many homes and businesses.

== Geography ==
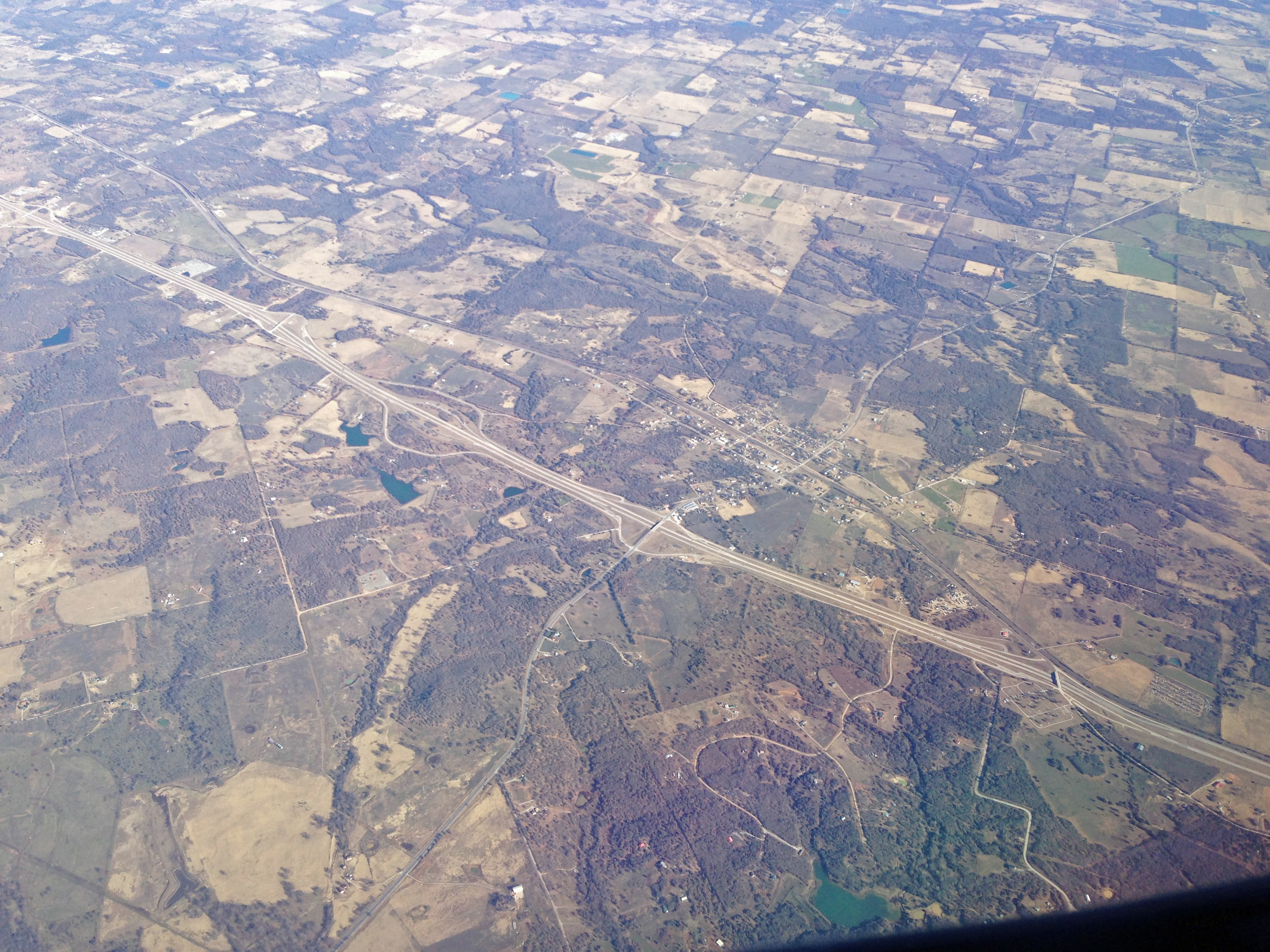
Sunset from above - Fredlyfish4

According to the United States Census Bureau, the city has a total area of 1.1 square miles (2.8 km^{2}), all land.

== Demographics ==
Historical population
Census	Pop.	Note	%±
2000	339		—
2010	497		46.6%
2020	543		9.3%
U.S. Decennial Census; 1850–1900 1910; 1920 1930 1940; 1950 1960 1970; 1980 1990 2000; 2010 2020

Sunset appeared as a city in the 2000 U.S. census; and was redesignated as a census designated place in the 2010 U.S. census.

=== 2020 census ===
Sunset CDP (Montague County), Texas – Racial and ethnic composition Note: the US Census treats Hispanic/Latino as an ethnic category. This table excludes Latinos from the racial categories and assigns them to a separate category. Hispanics/Latinos may be of any race.
Race / Ethnicity (NH = Non-Hispanic)	Pop 2000	Pop 2010	Pop 2020	% 2000	% 2010	% 2020
White alone (NH)	317	459	468	93.51%	92.35%	86.19%
Black or African American alone (NH)	0	5	5	0.00%	1.01%	0.92%
Native American or Alaska Native alone (NH)	0	4	4	0.00%	0.80%	0.74%
Asian alone (NH)	4	1	1	1.18%	0.20%	0.18%
Native Hawaiian or Pacific Islander alone (NH)	0	0	0	0.00%	0.00%	0.00%
Other race alone (NH)	0	0	0	0.00%	0.00%	0.00%
Mixed race or Multiracial (NH)	7	1	17	2.06%	0.20%	3.13%
Hispanic or Latino (any race)	11	27	48	3.24%	5.43%	8.84%
Total	339	497	543	100.00%	100.00%	100.00%

As of the census of 2000, Sunset had 339 people, 133 households, and 90 families with a population density of 318.8 people per square mile (123.5/km^{2}). Additionally, Sunset had 151 housing units at an average density of 142.0 per square mile (54.8/km^{2}). The racial makeup was 95.28% White, 1.18% Asian, 1.47% from other races, and 2.06% from two or more races. Hispanics or Latinos of any race were 3.24% of the population.

Of the 133 households noted in the 2000 census, 36.1% had children under the age of 18, 54.1% were married couples living together, 8.3% had a female householder with no husband present, and 31.6% were not families. About 28.6% of all households were made up of individuals, and 14.3% had someone living alone who was 65 years of age or older. The average household size was 2.55 and the average family size was 3.15.

Per the 2000 census, the population of Sunset was distributed as 18 or younger (28.6%), 18-24 (7.7%), 25-44 (28.9%), 45-64 (22.1%), and 65 or older (12.7%). The median age was 35 years.

The median income at the 2000 census was $24,886 for households and $29,643 for families. Males had a median income of $26,875 versus $17,083 for females. The per capita income for the city was $11,304. About 17.3% of families and 16.5% of the population were below the poverty line, including 26.4% of those under the age of 18 and 4.2% of those 65 or over.

== Education ==
Sunset is served by the Bowie Independent School District.
