= Saint Jo Independent School District =

School district in Texas, United States

Coordinates: 33.6915°N 97.5219°W

Saint Jo Independent School District is a public school district based in Saint Jo, Texas (USA).

Located in Montague County, a small portion of the district extends into Cooke County.

== Academic achievement ==
In 2009, the school district was rated "recognized" by the Texas Education Agency.

== Schools ==
- Saint Jo High School (Grades 7-12)
- Saint Jo Elementary School (Grades PK-6)
  - 2005 National Blue Ribbon School

== See also ==
- List of school districts in Texas
