= Bowie, Texas =

City in Montague County, Texas, US

Bowie
- City
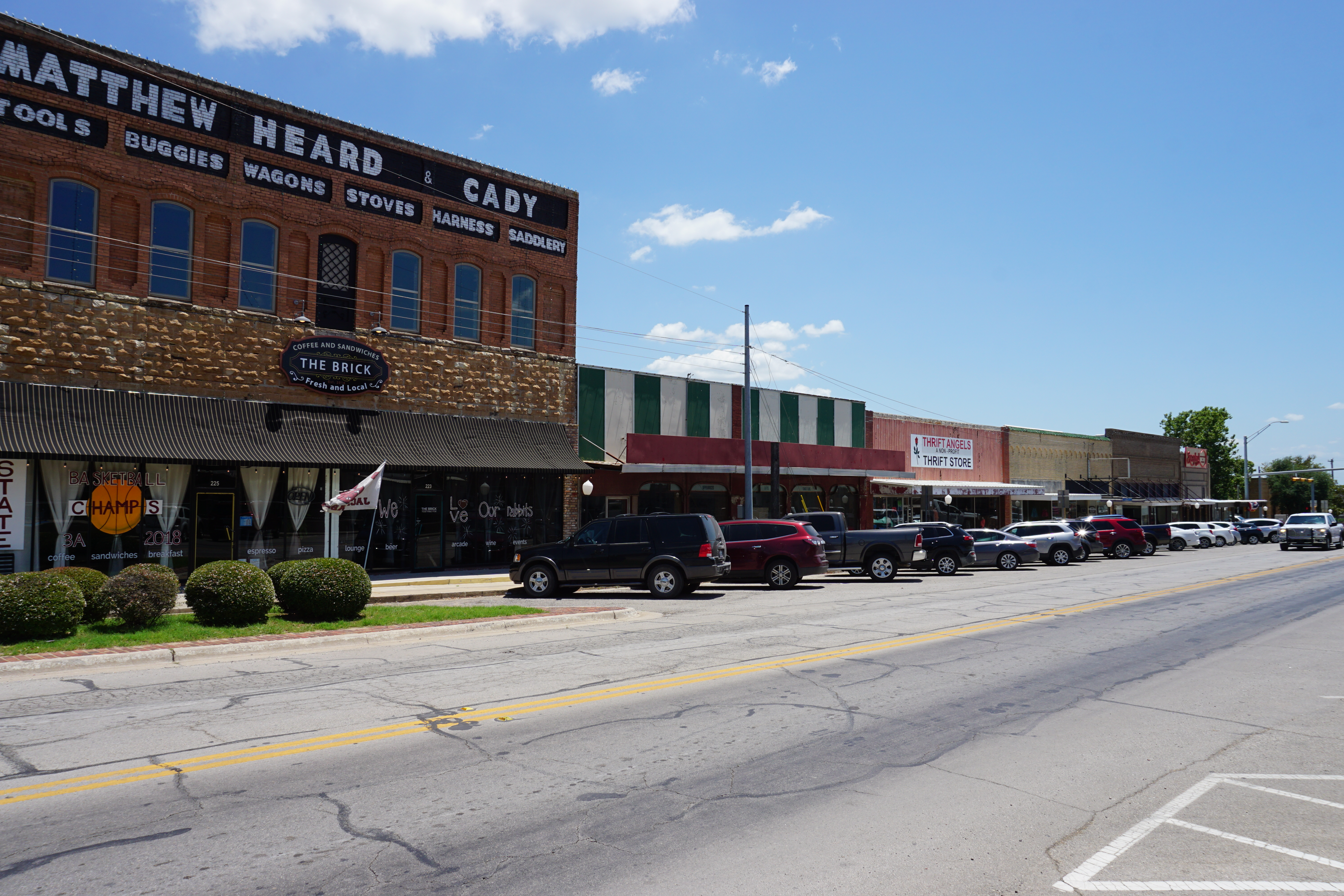
- Downtown Bowie, Texas
- Interactive map of Bowie
- Coordinates: 33°33′32″N 97°50′55″W
- Country: United States
- State: Texas
- County: Montague

Government
  - Type: Council-Manager

Area
  - Total: 5.54 sq mi (14.36 km^{2})
  - Land: 5.52 sq mi (14.29 km^{2})
  - Water: 0.023 sq mi (0.06 km^{2})
- Elevation: 1,116 ft (340 m)

Population (2020)
  - Total: 5,448
  - Estimate (2021): 5,534
  - Density: 987.4/sq mi (381.2/km^{2})
- Time zone: UTC-6 (Central (CST))
  - Summer (DST): UTC-5 (CDT)
- ZIP code: 76230
- Area code: 940
- FIPS code: 48-09640
- GNIS feature ID: 1352736
- Website: www.cityofbowietx.com

Bowie (/ˈbuːi/ BOO-ee) is a town in Montague County, Texas, United States. Its population was 5,448 at the 2020 census.

== History ==
On July 22, 1881, Bowie was incorporated as a town in Montague County, Texas, United States. (A separate Bowie County includes Texarkana in northeastern Texas.) The town began to expand with the arrival of the Fort Worth and Denver Railway in 1882. In 1884, four men robbed the First National Bank of Bowie and allegedly left with over $10,000 in gold coins. Townspeople gave chase and eventually captured the robbers, who were hanged for their crimes. By 1913, the town had a population of more than 5,000, and included the Bowie Commercial College.

U.S. President Franklin D. Roosevelt visited the town on his train on July 11, 1938. He ceremonially purchased biscuits from businessman Amon G. Carter of Fort Worth, who had grown up in Bowie. On August 19, 1941, Rex Beard, Jr., robbed the First National Bank of Bowie and was captured in December of that same year. An EF1 tornado hit the town of Bowie on May 22, 2020. On March 21, 2022, two EF1 tornadoes hit the town.

== Geography ==
According to the United States Census Bureau, Bowie has a total area of 5.54 square miles (14.3 km^{2}), of which 0.02 sq mi (0.052 km^{2}) is covered by water.

=== Climate ===
The climate in this area is characterized by hot, humid summers and generally mild to cool winters. According to the Köppen climate classification, Bowie has a humid subtropical climate, Cfa on climate maps. Record extremes there have ranged from 115 °F (46 °C) in June 1980 to −15 °F (−26 °C) in February 1899.

Climate data for Bowie, Texas (1991–2020 normals, extremes 1897–present)
| Month | Jan | Feb | Mar | Apr | May | Jun | Jul | Aug | Sep | Oct | Nov | Dec | Year |
|---|---|---|---|---|---|---|---|---|---|---|---|---|---|
| Record high °F (°C) | 92 (33) | 94 (34) | 100 (38) | 105 (41) | 107 (42) | 115 (46) | 113 (45) | 114 (46) | 109 (43) | 103 (39) | 91 (33) | 88 (31) | 115 (46) |
| Mean maximum °F (°C) | 75.4 (24.1) | 80.0 (26.7) | 86.7 (30.4) | 89.3 (31.8) | 93.4 (34.1) | 96.5 (35.8) | 101.0 (38.3) | 101.6 (38.7) | 97.4 (36.3) | 90.7 (32.6) | 81.6 (27.6) | 76.1 (24.5) | 103.4 (39.7) |
| Mean daily maximum °F (°C) | 54.1 (12.3) | 58.4 (14.7) | 66.7 (19.3) | 74.4 (23.6) | 81.0 (27.2) | 88.7 (31.5) | 93.4 (34.1) | 93.9 (34.4) | 86.3 (30.2) | 76.2 (24.6) | 64.8 (18.2) | 55.4 (13.0) | 74.4 (23.6) |
| Daily mean °F (°C) | 42.0 (5.6) | 46.1 (7.8) | 54.2 (12.3) | 62.0 (16.7) | 70.2 (21.2) | 78.3 (25.7) | 82.6 (28.1) | 82.6 (28.1) | 75.0 (23.9) | 64.3 (17.9) | 52.7 (11.5) | 43.8 (6.6) | 62.8 (17.1) |
| Mean daily minimum °F (°C) | 30.0 (−1.1) | 33.8 (1.0) | 41.7 (5.4) | 49.6 (9.8) | 59.4 (15.2) | 68.0 (20.0) | 71.9 (22.2) | 71.4 (21.9) | 63.6 (17.6) | 52.4 (11.3) | 40.5 (4.7) | 32.2 (0.1) | 51.2 (10.7) |
| Mean minimum °F (°C) | 15.6 (−9.1) | 19.0 (−7.2) | 24.6 (−4.1) | 34.2 (1.2) | 44.7 (7.1) | 58.9 (14.9) | 65.3 (18.5) | 63.9 (17.7) | 51.3 (10.7) | 36.0 (2.2) | 24.8 (−4.0) | 17.2 (−8.2) | 11.8 (−11.2) |
| Record low °F (°C) | −6 (−21) | −15 (−26) | 7 (−14) | 22 (−6) | 33 (1) | 45 (7) | 50 (10) | 52 (11) | 36 (2) | 18 (−8) | 13 (−11) | −11 (−24) | −15 (−26) |
| Average precipitation inches (mm) | 1.64 (42) | 2.29 (58) | 3.00 (76) | 3.04 (77) | 5.22 (133) | 4.00 (102) | 2.63 (67) | 2.47 (63) | 3.23 (82) | 3.62 (92) | 2.10 (53) | 2.08 (53) | 35.32 (897) |
| Average snowfall inches (cm) | 0.4 (1.0) | 0.0 (0.0) | 0.0 (0.0) | 0.0 (0.0) | 0.0 (0.0) | 0.0 (0.0) | 0.0 (0.0) | 0.0 (0.0) | 0.0 (0.0) | 0.0 (0.0) | 0.0 (0.0) | 0.3 (0.76) | 0.7 (1.8) |
| Average precipitation days (≥ 0.01 in) | 4.5 | 4.8 | 5.4 | 5.4 | 7.8 | 6.3 | 4.1 | 4.5 | 5.1 | 5.6 | 4.4 | 4.2 | 62.1 |
| Average snowy days (≥ 0.1 in) | 0.2 | 0.1 | 0.1 | 0.0 | 0.0 | 0.0 | 0.0 | 0.0 | 0.0 | 0.0 | 0.0 | 0.2 | 0.6 |
Source: NOAAIEM

=== Roads ===
- U.S. Route 81
- U.S. Route 287
- Texas State Highway 59

== Demographics ==
Historical population
| Census | Pop. | Note | %± |
|---|---|---|---|
| 1890 | 1,486 | | — |
| 1900 | 2,600 | | 75.0% |
| 1910 | 2,874 | | 10.5% |
| 1920 | 3,179 | | 10.6% |
| 1930 | 3,131 | | −1.5% |
| 1940 | 3,470 | | 10.8% |
| 1950 | 4,544 | | 31.0% |
| 1960 | 4,566 | | 0.5% |
| 1970 | 5,185 | | 13.6% |
| 1980 | 5,610 | | 8.2% |
| 1990 | 4,990 | | −11.1% |
| 2000 | 5,219 | | 4.6% |
| 2010 | 5,218 | | 0.0% |
| 2020 | 5,448 | | 4.4% |
| 2021 (est.) | 5,534 | | 1.6% |
U.S. Decennial Census

=== 2020 census ===
Bowie racial composition (NH = Non-Hispanic) (Note: Note: the US Census treats Hispanic/Latino as an ethnic category. This table excludes Latinos from the racial categories and assigns them to a separate category. Hispanics/Latinos can be of any race.)
| Race | Number | Percentage |
|---|---|---|
| White (NH) | 4,177 | 76.67% |
| Black or African American (NH) | 33 | 0.61% |
| Native American or Alaska Native (NH) | 44 | 0.81% |
| Asian (NH) | 36 | 0.66% |
| Pacific Islander (NH) | 2 | 0.04% |
| Some other race (NH) | 7 | 0.13% |
| Multiracial (NH) | 275 | 5.05% |
| Hispanic or Latino | 874 | 16.04% |
| Total | 5,448 | |

As of the 2020 census, Bowie had a population of 5,448. The median age was 38.5 years; 25.9% of residents were under 18 and 20.2% of residents were 65 or older. For every 100 females there were 89.2 males, and for every 100 females 18 and over, there were 85.3 males 18 and over.

About 98.3% of residents lived in urban areas, while 1.7% lived in rural areas.

Of the 2,127 households in Bowie, 33.1% had children under 18 living in them, 44.8% were married-couple households, 17.5% were households with a male householder and no spouse or partner present, and 31.0% were households with a female householder and no spouse or partner present. About 31.4% of all households were made up of individuals, and 17.5% had someone living alone who was 65 or older.

Of the 2,506 housing units, 15.1% were vacant. Among occupied housing units, 63.3% were owner-occupied and 36.7% were renter-occupied. The homeowner vacancy rate was 3.2% and the rental vacancy rate was 12.2%.

Racial composition as of the 2020 census
| Race | Percent |
|---|---|
| White | 81.6% |
| Black or African American | 0.7% |
| American Indian and Alaska Native | 1.0% |
| Asian | 0.7% |
| Native Hawaiian and other Pacific Islander | <0.1% |
| Some other race | 4.2% |
| Two or more races | 11.9% |
| Hispanic or Latino (of any race)' | 16.0% |

=== 2010 census ===
As of the 2010 United States census, 5,218 people and 2,090 households, with 2,489 housing units, were living in the town. The population density was 945.6 people per square mile. The average household size was 2.32 and the average family size was 2.99. The racial makeup of the town was 91.9% White, 0.2% African American, 1.0% Native American, 0.7% Asian, and 2.0% from two or more races. Hispanics or Latinos of any race were 11.6% of the population. The median income for a household in the town was $33,846. The per capita income for the town was $19,063.

== Education ==
The town is served by the Bowie Independent School District and a branch campus of North Central Texas College.

== Airport ==
Bowie Municipal Airport
- IATA: none; ICAO: none; FAA LID: 0F2

Summary
- Airport type: Public
- Owner: City of Bowie
- Serves: Bowie, Texas
- Location: 522 Private Road, Bowie, TX 76230
- Elevation AMSL: 1,101 ft (336 m)
- Coordinates: 33°36′06″N 097°46′32″W

Map
- Location within Texas

Runways
| Direction | Length | | Surface |
| Direction | ft | m | Surface |
|---|---|---|---|
| 17/35 | 3,603 | 1,098 | Asphalt |

Statistics (2022)
- Aircraft operations (year ending 9/19/2022): 7,350
- Based aircraft: 29
- Sources: Federal Aviation Administration

Bowie Municipal Airport (FAA LID: 0F2) is a city-owned public airport of the town, located approximately 4 nautical miles (7.4 km) northeast of the central business district. The airport has no IATA or ICAO designation.

Bowie Municipal Airport covers 52 acres (21 ha) at an elevation of 1,101 feet (336 m) above mean sea level and has one runway: 17/35: 3,603 x 60 ft. (1,098 x 18 m), surface - asphalt

For the 12-month period ending September 19, 2022, the airport had 7,350 aircraft operations, an average of 20 per day; 100% general aviation and <1% military. At that time, 29 aircraft were based at this airport, 28 single-engine, and 1 helicopter.

=== Accidents and incidents ===
- 15 August 2014: A Cessna 414, registration number N127BC, was on approach to land when it suddenly went into a spin and hit the ground in a nose-down attitude. The aircraft was consumed in an immediate postimpact fire and the pilot and single passenger were killed. An autopsy of the pilot revealed acute, premortem, nonocclusive thrombosis of the left anterior descending coronary artery, and the medical examiner concluded, "[the pilot] died primarily to hypertensive and atherosclerotic cardiovascular disease and that his multiple blunt force injuries likely contributed to his death." The accident was attributed to "The pilot's incapacitation in flight as the result of an acute cardiac event, which resulted in a loss of control and collision with terrain."

== Notable people ==
- James V. Allred, 33rd governor of Texas
- Amon Carter, businessman, creator and publisher of the Fort Worth Star-Telegram
- Woodrow Chambliss, actor

== Gallery ==
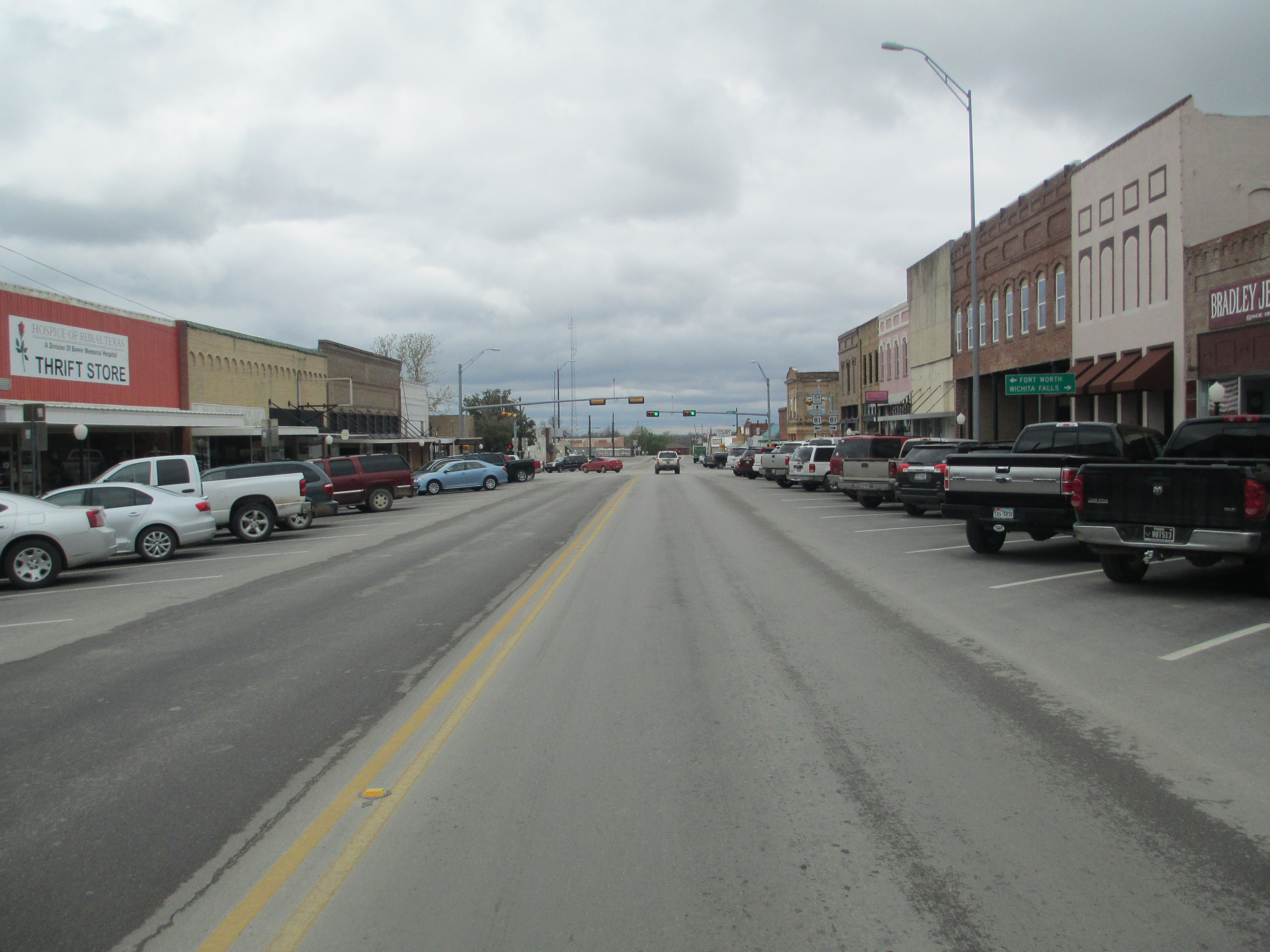
A look at downtown Bowie (2013)

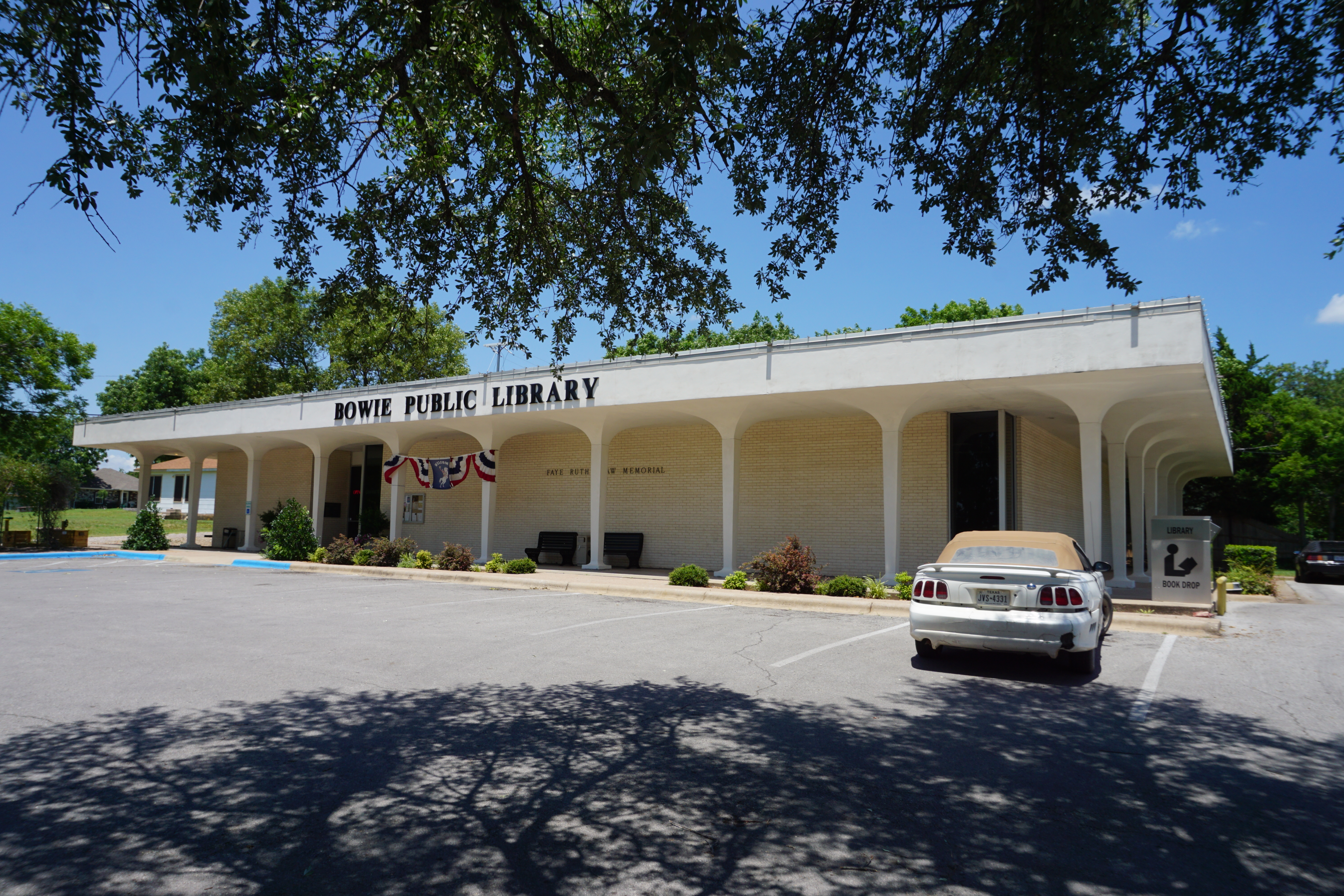
Bowie Public Library

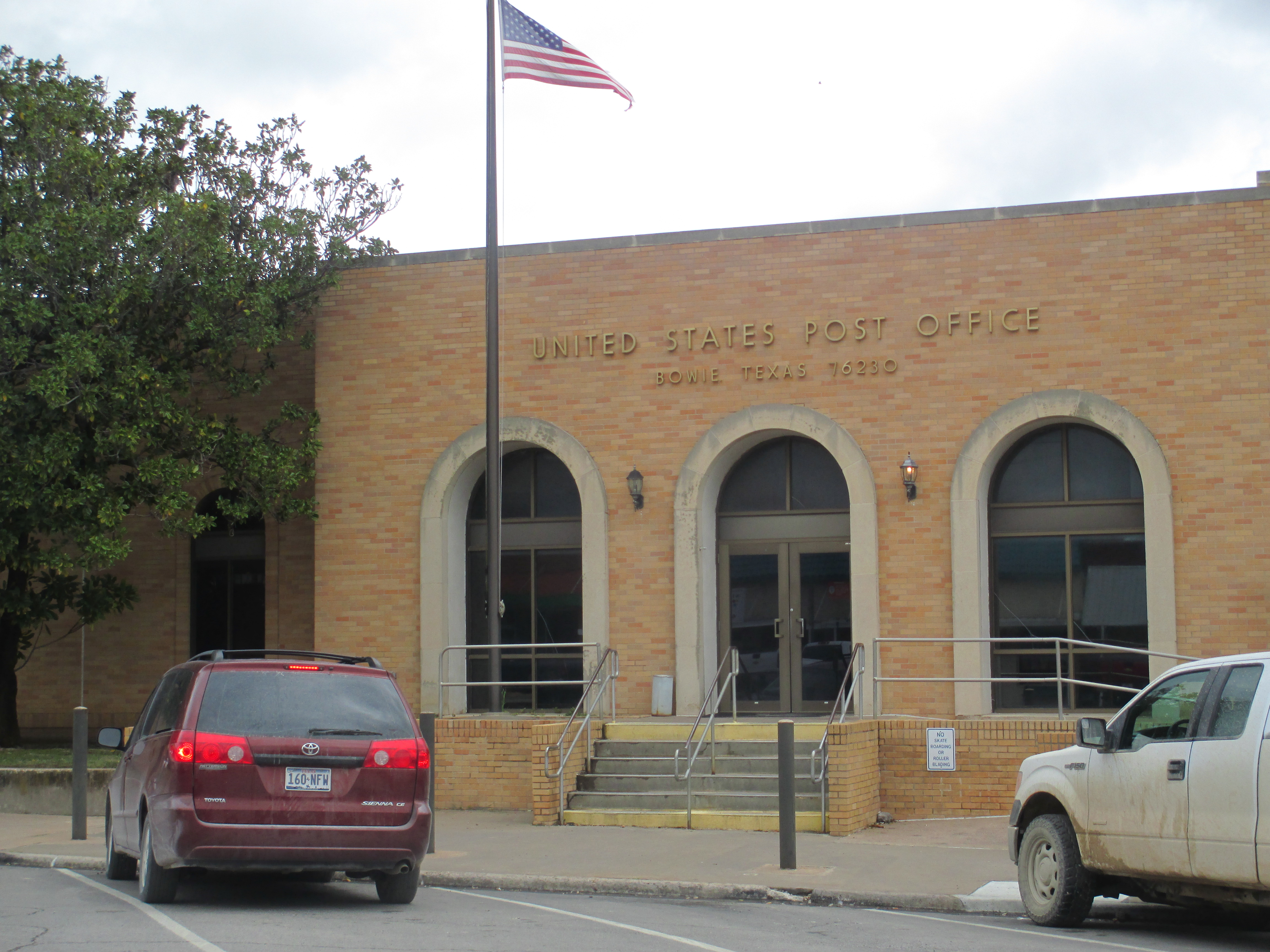
U.S. Post Office in Bowie

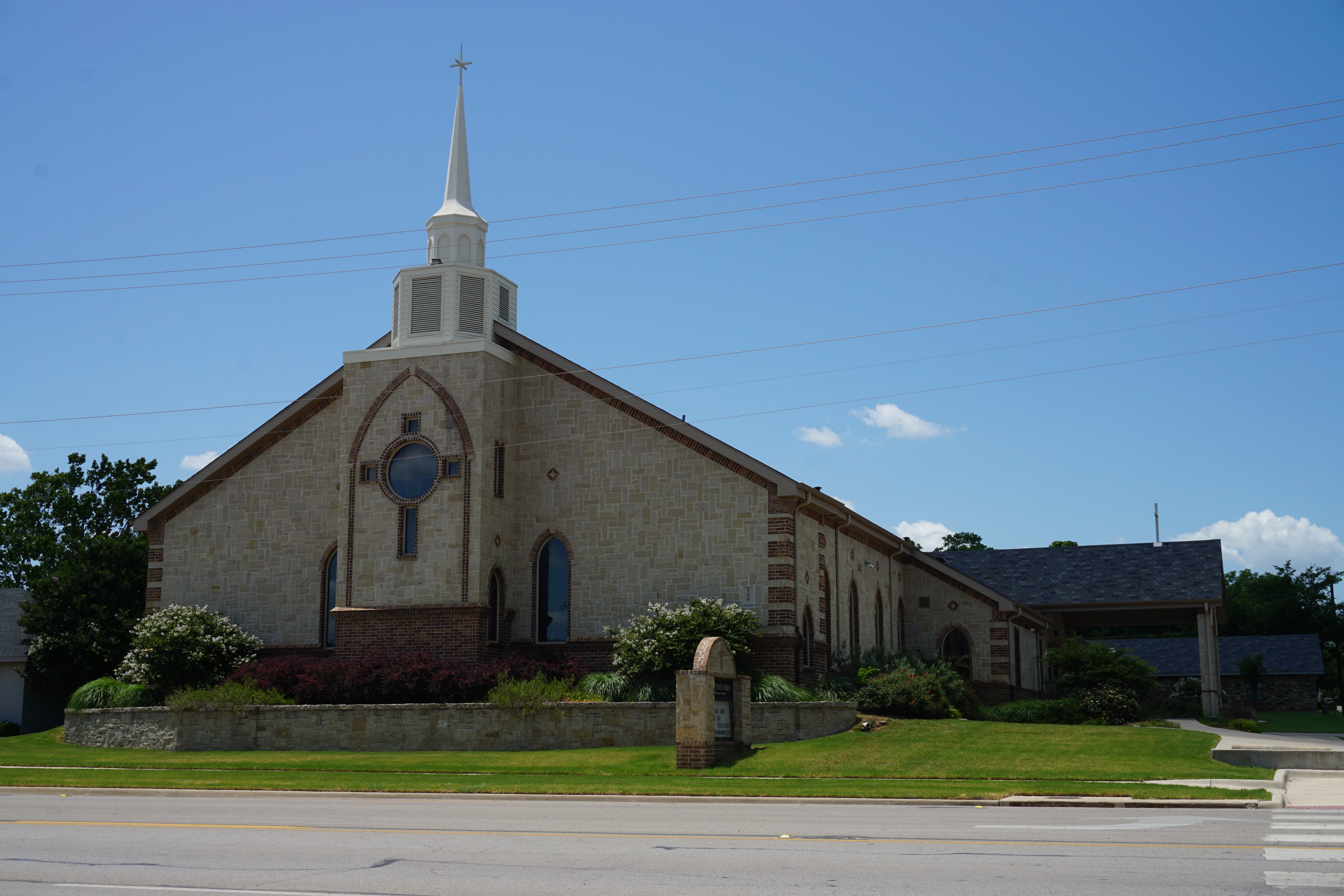
St. Peter Lutheran Church at 906 Highway 59 North in Bowie; Pastor Larry Knobloch (2013)
