= St. Jo, Texas =

Saint Jo, Texas
- City
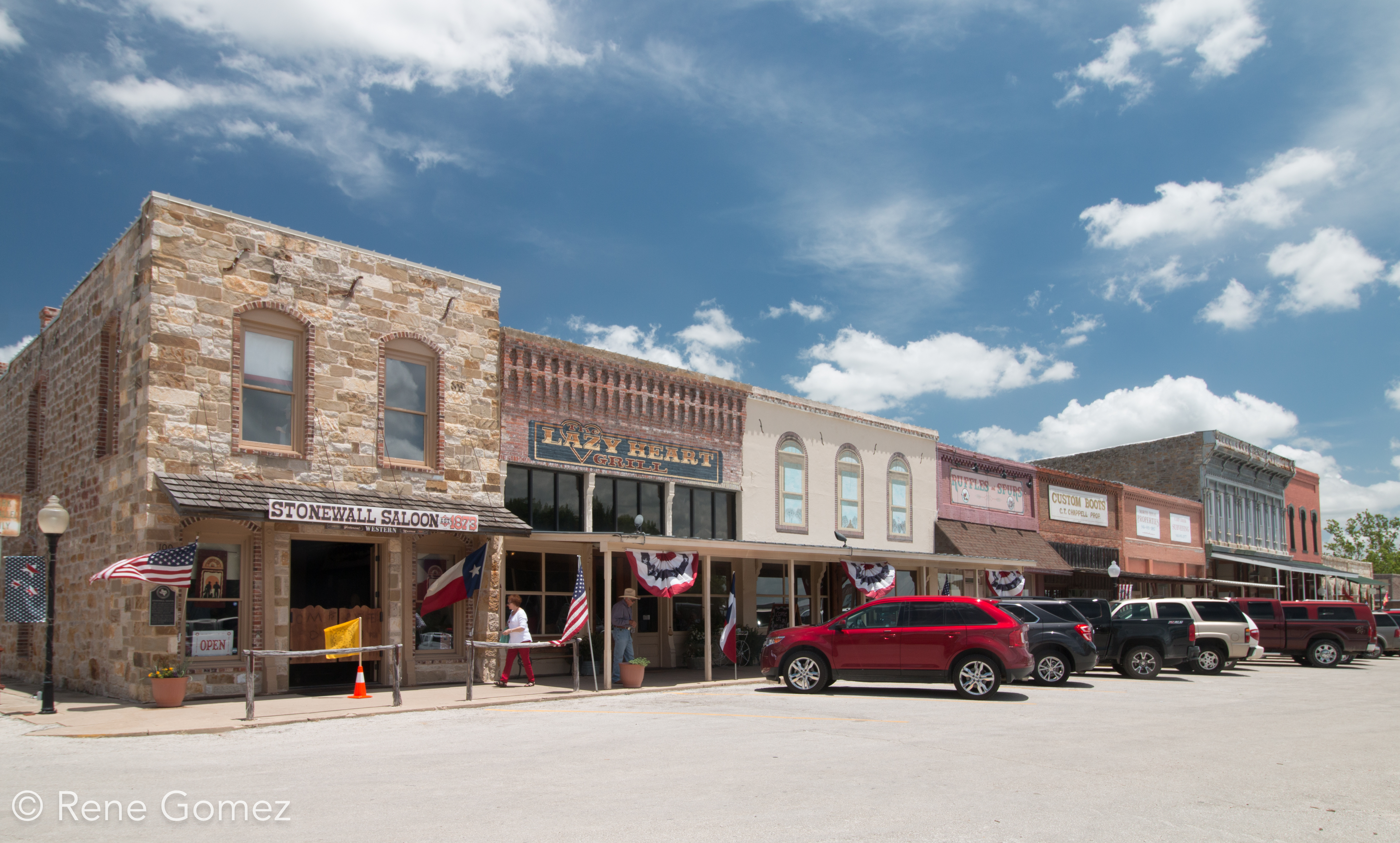

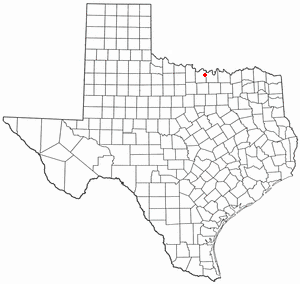
- Location of Saint Jo, Texas

- Coordinates: 33°41′42″N 97°31′23″W
- Country: United States
- State: Texas
- County: Montague

Area
  - Total: 1.08 sq mi (2.79 km^{2})
  - Land: 1.08 sq mi (2.79 km^{2})
  - Water: 0 sq mi (0.00 km^{2})
- Elevation: 1,142 ft (348 m)

Population (2020)
  - Total: 881
  - Density: 818/sq mi (316/km^{2})
- Time zone: UTC-6 (Central (CST))
  - Summer (DST): UTC-5 (CDT)
- FIPS code: 48-64184
- GNIS feature ID: 2411760

Saint Jo is a city in Montague County, Texas, United States, along the northern border of the state. The population was 881 at the 2020 census.

== History ==
Established by primarily European Americans in 1856, the city was originally known as Head of Elm, named for its location at the headwaters of the Elm Fork of the Trinity River, one of the four distinct headwaters. Numerous settlers came to this area from the Upper South of Tennessee and Kentucky, attracted to new opportunities in Texas.

Joe Howell was a surveyor who originally laid out the town and is credited as founder. According to one account, Irby Holt Boggess from Tennessee gave leadership in partnership with Howell in or around 1872. This account was displayed in 1986 in the Stonewall Saloon Museum on the town square of Saint Jo. It is incorporated in a story about Boggess.

Howell was said to have opposed alcoholic beverage sales, and was given the pejorative nickname "Saint Jo." This was also applied to the town he founded. But in 1880 Zachariah T. Haden, who had come from Paducah, Kentucky with his family, was working as a saloon keeper in Saint Jo, perhaps at the Stonewall Saloon.

Saint Jo was located near Red River Station, a trading post on the Red River. In the post-Civil War period, this post became the southern terminus of the Chisholm Trail. As ranchers undertook cattle drives to get their cattle to railheads in Kansas and then shipped East, where they could command high prices, the areas related to the trail began to develop increased populations and businesses. Cowboys were the chief customers for saloons and hotels in these towns. Eventually railroads were constructed into Texas, ending the cattle drives to Kansas, and drawing off business along the trail.

After the United States' 20th-century Prohibition era, from 1920 to 1933, Saint Jo voted to remain a "dry" city. It was not until May 2009 that residents voted to allow the sale of alcoholic beverages for off-premises consumption.

Saint Jo has been proud of its Western heritage and encourages tourism related to it. For instance, the Stonewall Saloon has been preserved for use as a museum, and the main street has retained its late 19th-century character.

On May 6, 2017, the Real Chisholm Trail Symposium met in Saint Jo. Program participants included representatives of the West Texas Historical Association, the Trail Drivers Association, and the Fort Sill Museum in Fort Sill, Oklahoma. Gary and Margaret Kraisinger, the joint authors of the 2004 book The Western: The Greatest Texas Cattle Trail, 1874–1886, also appeared.

The city holds BoHo Saint Jo semiannually, a collaborative event produced with the retail clothing store Panache. The event features local vendors who can showcase their locally sourced goods.

== Geography ==
According to the United States Census Bureau, the city has a total area of 1.1 square miles (2.8 km^{2}), all land.

== Demographics ==
Historical population
Census	Pop.	Note	%±
1880	342		—
1890	710		107.6%
1900	825		16.2%
1910	822		−0.4%
1920	985		19.8%
1930	960		−2.5%
1940	1,010		5.2%
1950	1,147		13.6%
1960	977		−14.8%
1970	1,054		7.9%
1980	1,071		1.6%
1990	1,048		−2.1%
2000	977		−6.8%
2010	1,043		6.8%
2020	881		−15.5%
U.S. Decennial Census

=== 2020 census ===
As of the 2020 census, St. Jo had a population of 881 residents, 356 households, and 240 families residing in the city. The median age was 37.8 years, with 27.4% of residents under the age of 18 and 17.1% age 65 or older. For every 100 females there were 87.8 males, and for every 100 females age 18 and over there were 85.0 males age 18 and over.

0.0% of residents lived in urban areas, while 100.0% lived in rural areas.

Of those households, 35.4% had children under the age of 18 living in them. Of all households, 46.9% were married-couple households, 19.4% were households with a male householder and no spouse or partner present, and 28.9% were households with a female householder and no spouse or partner present. About 30.7% of all households were made up of individuals and 14.6% had someone living alone who was 65 years of age or older.

There were 436 housing units, of which 18.3% were vacant. The homeowner vacancy rate was 3.9% and the rental vacancy rate was 13.6%.

Racial composition as of the 2020 census
Race	Number	Percent
White	758	86.0%
Black or African American	3	0.3%
American Indian and Alaska Native	4	0.5%
Asian	0	0.0%
Native Hawaiian and Other Pacific Islander	0	0.0%
Some other race	35	4.0%
Two or more races	81	9.2%
Hispanic or Latino (of any race)	86	9.8%

=== 2000 census ===
As of the census of 2000, there were 977 people, 404 households, and 271 families residing in the city. The population density was 911.5 inhabitants per square mile (351.9/km^{2}). There were 470 housing units at an average density of 438.5 per square mile (169.3/km^{2}). The racial makeup of the city was 97.11% White, 0.20% African American, 0.82% Native American, 0.10% Asian, 1.43% from other races, and 1.33% from two or more races. Hispanic or Latino of any race were 4.30% of the population.

There were 404 households, out of which 31.9% had children under the age of 18 living with them, 49.0% were married couples living together, 13.4% had a female householder with no husband present, and 32.9% were non-families. 30.9% of all households were made up of individuals, and 17.1% had someone living alone who was 65 years of age or older. The average household size was 2.40 and the average family size was 3.00.

In the city, the population was spread out, with 27.3% under the age of 18, 7.1% from 18 to 24, 25.2% from 25 to 44, 20.7% from 45 to 64, and 19.8% who were 65 years of age or older. The median age was 38 years. For every 100 females, there were 88.2 males. For every 100 females age 18 and over, there were 84.4 males.

The median income for a household in the city was $27,045, and the median income for a family was $35,500. Males had a median income of $31,711 versus $20,859 for females. The per capita income for the city was $15,225. About 13.5% of families and 15.5% of the population were below the poverty line, including 21.5% of those under age 18 and 13.9% of those age 65 or over.

== Education ==
Saint Jo is served by the Saint Jo Independent School District.

== Photo gallery ==
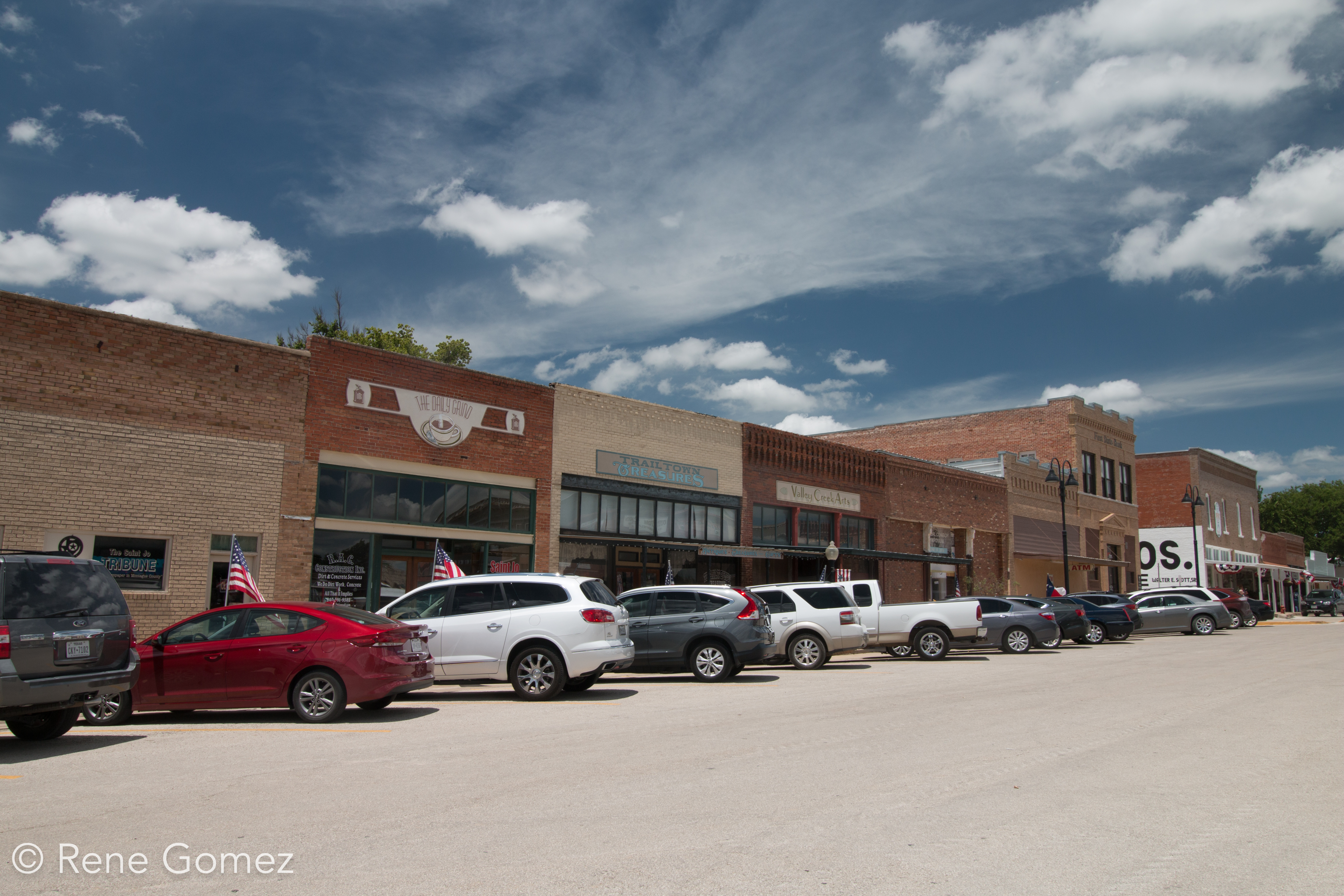
Downtown St. Jo

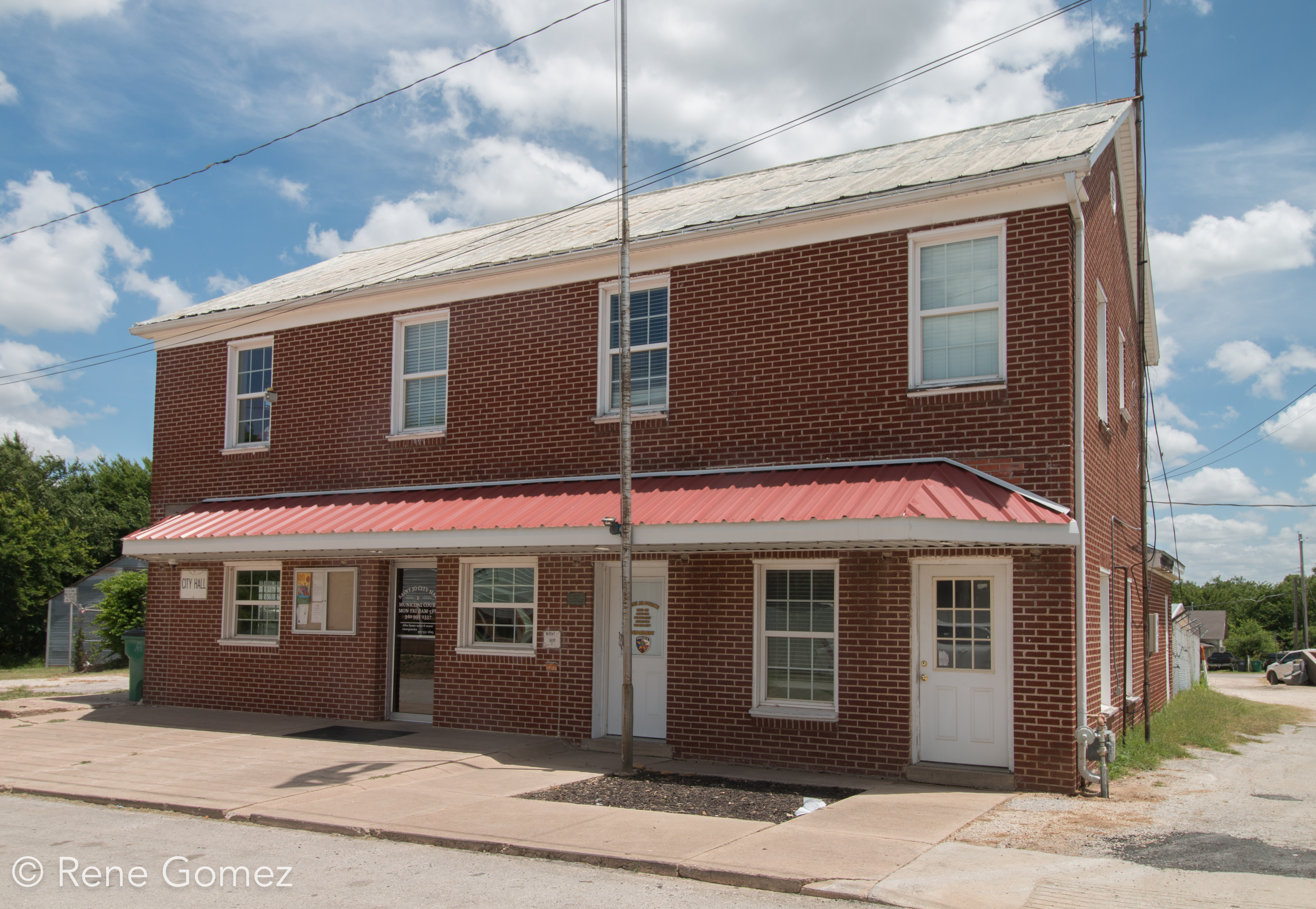
City hall
