= Montagu (surname) =

Montagu (/ˈmɒntəɡjuː/ MON-tə-ghew) is an English surname of Old French origin, a form of Montague. One notable family with this surname is the House of Montagu, who include the Earls of Sandwich. Notable people with the surname include:

- Lady Agneta Harriet Montagu (1838–1919), English aristocrat and bridesmaid to Alexandra of Denmark
- Alberta Montagu, Countess of Sandwich (1877–1951), American wife of the 9th Earl of Sandwich
- Alexander Montagu, 13th Duke of Manchester (b. 1962), the current Duke of Manchester
- Ashley Montagu (1905–1999), anthropologist
- Charles Montagu (disambiguation), several persons
- David Montagu, 4th Baron Swaythling (1928–1998), British peer and industrialist
- Edward Montagu (disambiguation), several persons

- Edward Montagu, 1st Baron Montagu (died 1361), English peer
- Sir Edward Montagu (judge) (c.1485–1556/1557), English lawyer and judge
- Sir Edward Montagu of Boughton (1532–1601/1602) of Boughton House
- Edward Montagu, 1st Baron Montagu of Boughton (1560–1644), son of the above
- Edward Montagu, 2nd Earl of Manchester (1602–1671)
- Edward Montagu, 1st Earl of Sandwich (1625–1672), English landowner, military officer and politician
- Edward Montagu, 2nd Earl of Sandwich (1648–1688)
- Edward Montagu, 2nd Baron Montagu of Boughton (1616–1684), Baron Montagu of Boughton House
- Edward Montagu (died 1665) (c. 1636–1665), English MP for Sandwich
- Edward Montagu (1649–1690), English MP for Northamptonshire and Seaford
- Edward Montagu (1672–1710), English MP for Chippenham
- Edward Montagu, Viscount Hinchingbrooke (1692–1722)
- Edward Montagu, 3rd Earl of Sandwich (1670–1729)
- Edward Montagu (died 1738) (after 1684–1738), British MP for Northampton
- Edward Montagu (1692–1776), British MP for Huntingdon
- Edward Wortley Montagu (traveller) (1713–1776), English author and traveller
- Sir Edward Wortley Montagu (diplomat) (1678–1761), British diplomat
- Edward Hussey-Montagu, 1st Earl Beaulieu (1721–1802), British peer and politician
- Edward Montagu (Indian Army officer) (1755–1799)
- Edward Montagu, 8th Earl of Sandwich (1839–1916), Conservative politician and author (known as Viscount Hinchingbrooke until 1884)
- Edward Douglas-Scott-Montagu, 3rd Baron Montagu of Beaulieu (1926–2015), English politician

- Edwin Montagu (1879–1924), British Liberal politician
- Elizabeth Montagu (1718–1800), British bluestocking
- Lady Elizabeth Montagu (1917–2006), British novelist and nurse
- Ewen Montagu (1901–1985), British judge, writer and Naval intelligence officer
- Felicity Montagu (b. 1960), British actress
- Frederick Montagu (disambiguation)
- George Montagu, 4th Duke of Manchester (1737–1788), British politician and diplomat
- George Montagu (naturalist) (1753–1815), British naturalist
- George Montagu (Royal Navy officer) (1750–1829)
- Georgina Montagu, British journalist and author
- Heneage Montagu (1675–1698), younger son of Robert Montagu, 3rd Earl of Manchester
- Henry Montagu, 1st Earl of Manchester (c. 1563 – 1642), English judge, politician and peer
- Henry Neville Montagu (c. 1823–1901), teacher and journalist in Australia
- James Montagu (judge) (1666–1723), English barrister, and judge
- James Montagu (Royal Navy officer) (1752–1794)
- Jennifer Montagu (born 1931), British art historian
- John Montagu (disambiguation), several persons

- John Montagu, 1st Baron Montagu (c. 1330–c. 1390), English nobleman
- John Montagu, 3rd Earl of Salisbury (c. 1350–1400), English nobleman
- John Montagu (Trinity) (c. 1650–1728), Master of Trinity College, Cambridge, 1683–1699
- John Montagu, 2nd Duke of Montagu (1690–1749), British peer
- John Montagu, 4th Earl of Sandwich (1718–1792), British statesman, claimed inventor of the sandwich
- John Montagu (Royal Navy officer) (1719–1795), Governor for Newfoundland and Labrador
- John Montagu, Marquess of Monthermer (1735–1770), British peer
- John Montagu, 5th Earl of Sandwich (1744–1814), British peer and Tory politician
- John Montagu (colonial secretary) (1797–1853), British army officer and Colonial Secretary
- John Montagu, 7th Earl of Sandwich (1811–1884), British peer and Conservative politician
- John Montagu, 11th Earl of Sandwich (born 1943), British entrepreneur and politician

- Julie Montagu, Viscountess Hinchingbrooke (born 1972), American entrepreneur, yoga instructor, blogger, writer and reality television star
- Lady Mary Faith Montagu (1911–1983), British aristocrat
- Lady Mary Wortley Montagu (1689–1762), British aristocrat and writer
- Lily Montagu (1873–1963), first woman to play a major role in Reform Judaism
- Ralph Montagu, 1st Duke of Montagu (1638–1709), English courtier and diplomat
- Bishop Richard Montagu (1577–1641), English cleric and writer
- Lord Robert Montagu (1825–1902), British Conservative politician and member of the Privy Council
- Louis Montagu, 2nd Baron Swaythling (1869–1927), British financier and Jewish anti-Zionist
- Nicholas Montagu (b. 1944), British civil servant
- Robert Montagu (disambiguation), several people
- Samuel Montagu, 1st Baron Swaythling (1832–1911), British banker, philanthropist and Liberal politician

== See also ==
- Montague (surname)
- Montague (given name)
