= Montague =

Montague may refer to:

== Places ==
=== Australia ===
- Barunguba / Montague Island, an island off the coast of New South Wales
  - Montague Island Light, the island's lighthouse

In Victoria, South Melbourne:

  - Montague Street Bridge, South Melbourne
  - Montague Street light rail station, South Melbourne

=== Canada ===
- Montague, Ontario
  - Smiths Falls-Montague Airport
- Montague, Prince Edward Island
  - Lower Montague, Prince Edward Island
  - Montague-Kilmuir, an electoral district
- Montague Gold Mines, Nova Scotia
- Montague Harbour
  - Montague Harbour Marine Provincial Park
- Montague Road, Prince Edward Island

=== United Kingdom ===
- Montague Road, London
- Montague Street, London
- Shepton Montague Somerset, England
- Montagu House, Bloomsbury, the first home of the British Museum, also known as Montague House
- Montagu House, Portman Square, built for Elizabeth Montagu on Portman Square
- Montagu House, Whitehall, another London mansion

=== United States ===
- Montague Island (Alaska)
- Montague, California
  - Montague Airport (California)
  - County Route G4 (California), the Montague Expressway, in the Silicon Valley
- Montague station in San Jose, California
- Montague, Massachusetts
  - Montague Road, Mass south of Montague Center
  - Montague Center Historic District
    - Gill–Montague Bridge
    - Montague City Road Bridge
- Montague Township, Michigan
  - Montague, Michigan
- Henry Montague House in Kalamazoo, Michigan, which was listed on the National Register of Historic Places in 1983
- Montague, Missouri
- Montague Township, New Jersey
  - Milford–Montague Toll Bridge
- Montague, New York
- Brooklyn, New York
  - Montague Street Tunnel
  - Montague-Court Building
- Montague, North Carolina
- Montague County, Texas
  - Montague, Texas
    - Montague Independent School District

=== Elsewhere ===
- 535 Montague, a minor planet orbiting the Sun
- Montague Island (disambiguation)

== People with the name ==
- Montague (given name)
- Montague (surname)

== Arts, entertainment, and media ==
=== Fictional characters ===
- Montague family, one of the main families in the play Romeo and Juliet by William Shakespeare
- Monty Bodkin, a fictional character in three novels of English comic writer P. G. Wodehouse
- Montague (Johnny Test) the mouse, a cartoon character
- Montague Egg, a fictional amateur detective
- Dr. John Montague, one of the main characters in Gothic horror novel The Haunting of Hill House
- Montague "Monty" D'Ysquith Navarro, a main character in the musical comedy A Gentleman's Guide to Love and Murder
- The real name of Duck the Great Western Engine, a character from Thomas the Tank Engine & Friends

=== Other uses in arts, entertainment, and media ===
- Montague (album), a 2020 album by Hov1
- "Montague Road", a song by Laura Veirs on her album The Triumphs and Travails of Orphan Mae
- I Capuleti e i Montecchi (The Capulets and the Montagues), an opera by Bellini
- Montagues and Capulets, also known as Dance of the Knights, from Prokofiev's ballet Romeo and Juliet

== Schools ==
- Montague Regional High School, Canada
- Montague Road School, England, which was replaced by The National Academy

== Ships ==
- HMS Montague, several Royal navy ships
- Montague (brigantine), patrol and settlement vessel, Nova Scotia, 1758-1760
- USS Montague (AKA-98), Andromeda-class attack cargo ship

== Other uses ==
- Montague Bicycles
- Montague grammar, an approach to natural language semantics
- Montague Hospital, South Yorkshire, England
- Montague's harrier, a migratory bird of prey
- Montague (horse)

== See also ==
- without "e"
- Montagu (disambiguation)
- Montagu House (disambiguation)
- Montaigu (disambiguation)
