= John Montagu (colonial secretary) =

British colonial secretary (1797–1853)

Colonial Secretary of the Cape Colony
- In office 23 April 1843 – 4 November 1853
- Preceded by: Sir John Bell
- Succeeded by: Sir Rawson Rawson

Colonial Secretary of Van Diemen's Land
- In office 8 August 1834 – 2 February 1842
- Preceded by: John Burnett
- Succeeded by: George Thomas Boyes

Personal details
- Born: 21 August 1797 Lackham, Wiltshire, England
- Died: 4 November 1853 (aged 56) Brighton, Sussex, England
- Resting place: Brompton Cemetery, London
- Spouse: Jessy Worsley (m. 1823–1853)
- Parent: Edward Montagu (father)
- Relatives: James Montagu (uncle); Sir George Montagu (uncle); John Montagu (grandfather)
- Education: Cheam School, Surrey

Military service
- Branch: British Army
- Years of service: 1814–1830
- Rank: Captain
- Regiments: 52nd, 64th, 81st, and 40th Foot
- Battles: Battle of Waterloo (1815)

John Montagu (21 August 1797 – 4 November 1853) was a British army officer and civil servant who served as Colonial Secretary of Van Diemen's Land from 1834 to 1842, and Colonial Secretary of the Cape Colony from 1843 to 1853.

Montagu is best known for his highly publicised dispute with Sir John Franklin, the famed polar explorer who held the office of Lieutenant-Governor of Van Diemen's Land at the time. After Montagu's suspension from office by Franklin, he travelled to London and managed to successfully plead his case and find the necessary support to nullify his suspension. Instead of a return to Van Diemen's Land, Montagu was offered the position of Colonial Secretary of the Cape Colony, which he accepted.

Franklin's subsequent removal from office meant he would be available for command of the Royal Navy's renewed attempt to complete the charting of the Northwest Passage, through the Arctic archipelago. The Franklin expedition set out in 1845, and was never heard from again.

== Early life ==
Montagu was born in Lackham, Wiltshire, the second son of Lieutenant-Colonel Edward Montagu, and his wife Barbara, née Fleetwood. Edward Montagu was great-great-grandson of Lord James Montagu (d. 1665), who was younger son of Henry Montagu, 1st Earl of Manchester. Edward died in 1799.

=== Army career ===
Montagu was sent to England to be educated; he was taught at Cheam School in Surrey, Parson's Green, in Knightsbridge, and by a private tutor. In February 1814, Montagu was commissioned ensign in the 52nd Regiment of Foot. Montagu fought at the battle of Waterloo, was promoted to lieutenant in November 1815, and to captain in the 64th Regiment of Foot in November 1822.
