= John Montagu =

John Montagu may refer to:

- John Montagu, 1st Baron Montagu (c. 1330–c. 1390), English nobleman
- John Montagu, 3rd Earl of Salisbury (c. 1350–1400), English nobleman
- John Montagu (Trinity) (c. 1650–1728), Master of Trinity College, Cambridge, 1683–1699
- John Montagu, 2nd Duke of Montagu (1690–1749), British peer
- John Montagu, 4th Earl of Sandwich (1718–1792), British statesman, claimed to be the eponymous inventor of the sandwich
- John Montagu (Royal Navy officer) (1719–1795), Commodore Governor for Newfoundland and Labrador, 1776–1778
- John Montagu, Marquess of Monthermer (1735–1770), British peer
- John Montagu, 5th Earl of Sandwich (1744–1814), British peer and Tory politician
- John Montagu (colonial secretary) (1797–1853), British army officer and Colonial Secretary of Van Diemen's Land and the Cape Colony
- John Montagu, 7th Earl of Sandwich (1811–1884), British peer and Conservative politician
- John Montagu, 11th Earl of Sandwich (1943–2025), British businessman and politician

== See also ==
- John Montague (disambiguation)
- Montagu (disambiguation)
