= Admiral Montagu =

Admiral Montagu may refer to:

- Edward Montagu, 1st Earl of Sandwich (1625–1672), British Royal Navy admiral
- George Montagu (Royal Navy officer) (1750–1829), British Royal Navy admiral
- John Montagu (Royal Navy officer) (1719–1795), British Royal Navy admiral
- Robert Montagu (Royal Navy officer) (1763–1830), British Royal Navy admiral
- Simon Montagu, 1st Baron Montagu (died 1316), English Admiral of the Fleet
- Victor Montagu (Royal Navy officer) (1841–1915), British Royal Navy rear admiral
- William Augustus Montagu (1785–1852), British Royal Navy vice admiral
