= Montagu House =

Montagu House or Montague House may refer to:

== England ==
- Montagu House, Bloomsbury, former mansion that became first home of the British Museum, also known as Montague House, since demolished
  - (a slang term for British Museum, on Great Russell Street, London, on site of former mansion)
- Montagu House, Portman Square, built for Elizabeth Montagu on Portman Square
- Montagu House, Whitehall, another London mansion
- Montagu House, Blackheath

== United States ==
- Henry Montague House, Kalamazoo, Michigan, listed on the National Register of Historic Places

== Australia ==
- Monty House (Montague Grant House, born 1946), Western Australian politician

== See also ==
- Montacute House
- Montague (disambiguation)
- Montagu (disambiguation)
