= Colonial Secretary of Tasmania =

British Colonial Office secretary

The Colonial Secretary of Van Diemen's Land (later Colonial Secretary of Tasmania) was the representative of the British Colonial Office in Van Diemen's Land (later Tasmania), and was usually appointed from Britain. In 1884, the role was renamed Chief Secretary.

== List of colonial secretaries of Van Diemen's Land/Tasmania ==
The following is an incomplete list of colonial secretaries of Van Diemen's Land/Tasmania:

=== Colonial secretaries of Van Diemen's Land ===
Colonial Secretary	Period in office
William H. Hamilton (acting)	1825–1826
John Burnett	1826 – 1834
John Montagu	1834–1838
Matthew Forster (acting)	1839–1840
John Montagu	1840 – 2 February 1842
George Thomas Boyes (acting)	2 February 1842 – 20 April 1843
James Ebenezer Bicheno	20 April 1843 – 25 February 1851
Peter Fraser (acting)	25 February 1851 – April 1852
Henry Samuel Chapman	April 1852 – November 1852
William Thomas Napier Champ	November 1852 – 31 October 1856

=== Colonial secretaries of Tasmania ===
Colonial Secretary	Period in office
William Thomas Napier Champ	1 November 1856 – 26 February 1857
Thomas George Gregson	26 February 1857 – 25 April 1857
William Henty	25 April 1857 – 1 November 1862
Frederick Maitland Innes	1 November 1862 – 21 January 1863
James Whyte	21 January 1863 – 24 November 1866
Richard Dry	24 November 1866 – 2 August 1869
James Milne Wilson	2 August 1869 – 4 November 1872
James Reid Scott	4 November 1872 – 4 August 1873
Thomas Daniel Chapman	4 August 1873 – 10 April 1876
George Gilmore	10 April 1876 – 20 July 1876
Thomas Reibey	20 July 1876 – 9 August 1877
William Moore	11 August 1877 – 20 December 1878
Thomas Reibey	20 December 1878 – 30 October 1879
William Moore	30 October 1879 – August 1884
