= Charles George Baker =

British-born soldier (1830–1906)

Charles George Baker VC
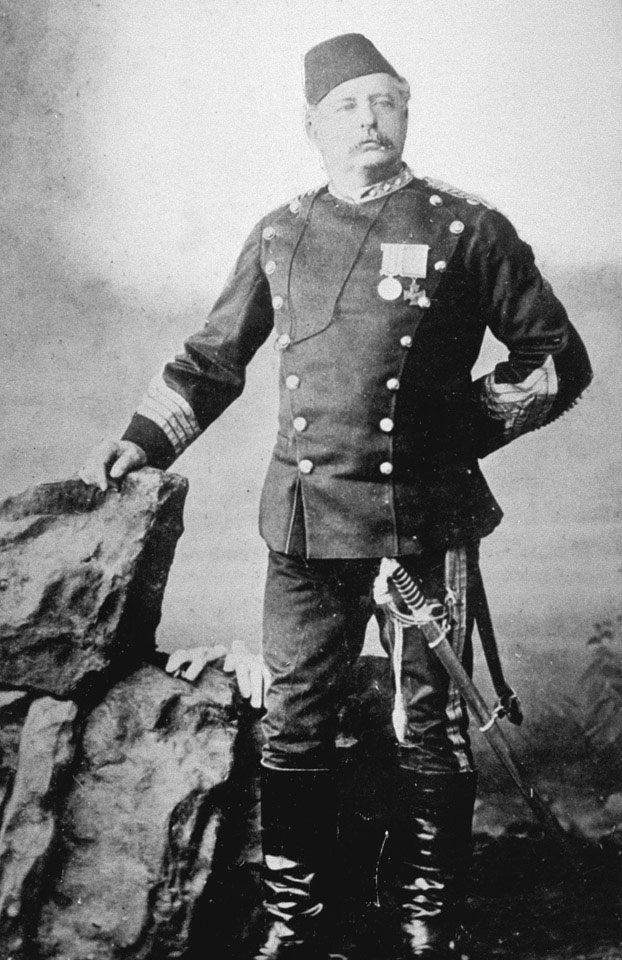
- Born: 8 December 1830; Noakhali, Bengal Presidency, British India
- Died: 19 February 1906 (aged 75); Southbourne, Dorset
- Burial place: Christchurch Cemetery, Dorset
- Military career
- Allegiance: United Kingdom
- Branch: Bengal Army; Turkish Army
- Rank: Major General
- Conflicts: Indian Mutiny; 1861 Sikkim Expedition; Russo-Turkish War
- Awards: Victoria Cross; Indian Mutiny Medal
- Other work: Head of the Egyptian Police Force

Major General and Lewa Pasha Charles George Baker VC (8 December 1830 – 19 February 1906) was a British Merchant Navy officer, a Bengal Army officer, a Turkish Army officer, and head of the Egyptian Police.

He was responsible for the rescue of the passengers and crew of the wrecked Steamship Douro. He was also a recipient of the Victoria Cross, the highest and most prestigious award for gallantry in the face of the enemy that can be awarded to British and Commonwealth forces. He subsequently went on to serve in the Turkish Army, becoming a Major General and Lewa Pasha. Following this he became head of the Egyptian Police Force.

== Early life ==
Charles George Baker was born in Noacolly (Noakhali), Bengal, British India on 8 December 1830 to John and Lydia Baker from Suffolk. John Baker was a Doctor in the East India Company's Medical Service. The young Baker was sent to England to be educated, attending schools in Halesworth and Lowestoft in Suffolk.

== Wreck of the Douro ==
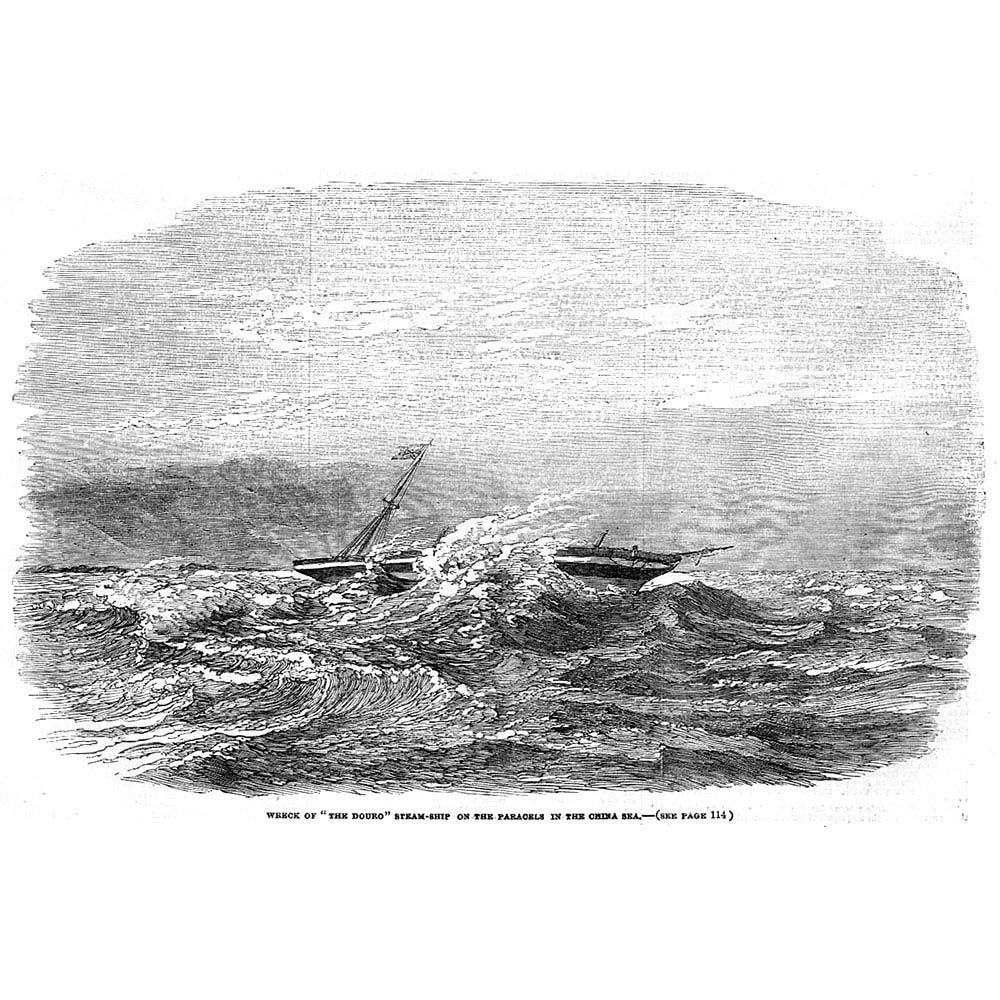
Engraving of the wreck of the Steamship "Douro" on the Paracels in the China Sea, taken from the Illustrated London News, 5 August 1854

While an employee of the Peninsular and Oriental Steam Navigation Company in 1854, Baker was serving as Second Officer aboard the Douro, a passenger vessel. As the ship was sailing near the Paracel Islands it struck the north shoal and was wrecked. On 26 May, accompanied by seven volunteers, Baker took a Jolly boat and set out for Hainan which he estimated was 123 miles (198 km) away. According to the log he kept, on arrival at the island of Hainan they were unable to locate signs of habitation, so the decision was made by him to head for Hong Kong. The first vessels they encountered on their journey turned out to be pirates who refused food, water, and other assistance unless the crew allowed themselves to be stripped of all valuables. The boat was able to escape, facing adverse weather conditions and taking on water.

After a journey totalling over 500 miles (800 km), the boat reached Hong Kong on the morning of 3 June. Baker reported the wreck, and was successful in securing rescue for the passengers and crew of the Douro, with the Steamships Malta, Tartar, and Pekin arriving at the site of the wreck on 5, 6 and 8 June respectively. The only loss of life from this incident was a member of the ship's crew who had fallen overboard.

== Military service ==
Shortly afterwards Baker found employment in the East India Company's Bengal Army, eventually joining the Bengal Military Police Battalion under then-Captain Thomas Rattray. He was appointed as Second in Command of the Bengal Military Police Battalion on its formation, on 15 April 1856, while simultaneously holding the positions within the unit of Commandant of Cavalry and Officiating Commandant. Baker served with them through the Indian Mutiny.

=== Victoria Cross ===
He was 27 years old, and a lieutenant during September 1858 when the cavalry portion of the Bengal Military Police Battalion was assigned to the Field Force commanded by Lieutenant-Colonel William West Turner CB, then responsible for the security of the Grand Trunk Road.

==== Baker's report ====
On 27 September Lt. Baker sent the following despatch to Lt. Col. Turner, detailing action at Suhejnee (Sahejani), near Peroo (Piro), Bhojpur:

Lieutenant C. G. Baker, Commandant of Cavalry, 1st Bengal Police Battalion, to Captain Gordon, Field Adjutant, Lieutenant-Colonel Turner's Field Force.
Camp Munjhaen,
September 27, 1858.

SIR, FOR the information of Lieutenant-Colonel Turner, C.B., Commanding Field Force, I have the honour to report the details of a successful attack by the cavalry detachments under my command, upon the rebel force at Suhejnee, near Peroo, which resulted in the total rout of the enemy, whose loss is estimated at from 80 to 90 killed and many wounded, with but a comparatively small list of casualties on our side.

In compliance with the orders of the officer commanding the field force, the detachments of cavalry noted in the margin [3rd Seikh Irregular Cavalry.—Ressaldar 1, Duffadars 3, Trumpeter 1, Troopers 49; Total 54. Under Lieutenant Broughton.—Volunteer doing duty; G. C. Blake, Esq. 1st Bengal Police Cavalry.—Resseldar 1, Jemadars 2, Duffadars 6, Trumpeter I, Troopers 58; Total 63. Under Lieutenant C. G. Baker.—Volunteers doing duty; Lieutenant and Adjutant Nolan, 2nd Bengal Police Battalion, and George B. Chicken, Esq., Master Indian Navy] marched at about 1 P.M. yesterday, with the view of intercepting the retreat of the rebel force posted in the village of Suhejnee, distant five miles.

On nearing the village above mentioned, I discovered the enemy in possession of it, as well as in occupation of all the neighbouring topes of trees, sugar-cane khets, &c., from which positions a heavy fire was at once opened. An irregular fire at intervals from the adjacent village of Nonar proved that place to be also held by the mutineer force.

Requesting Lieutenant Broughton, with the 3rd Seikh Irregular Cavalry, to take up a position to the north-west of Suhejnee, clear of the enemy's fire, which was now very hot, I halted my troop, and despatched a note to Lieutenant Colonel Turner, C.B., reporting the position of the enemy and the very difficult nature of the ground for cavalry to act upon, being a succession of muddy rice khets, intersected by water-courses.

The enemy observing us stationary, and seeing no infantry or guns advancing in support, became bold, threw out skirmishers, and emerging from their cover drew up in line, their right resting on Suhejnee, and their left on the village of Russowlee [Rasauli]. At this moment the rebel force must have mustered from 900 to 1000 strong in infantry, with 50 cavalry.

The enemy advanced. Without exchanging a shot I at once retired slowly, followed up steadily by the rebel line for a hundred yards clear of village or jungle, when suddenly wheeling about my divisions into line with a hearty cheer, we charged into and through the centre of the enemy's line, Lieutenant Broughton with his detachment immediately following up the movement, with excellent effect from his position upon the enemy's left. The rebel right wing, of about 300 men, broke at once, but the centre and left, observing the great labour of the horses in crossing the heavy ground, stood, and, receiving the charge with repeated volleys, were cut down or broke only a few yards ahead of the cavalry. From this moment the pursuit was limited to the strongest and best horses of the force, numbering some 60 of all ranks, who, dashing into and swimming a deep and wide nullah, followed the flying enemy through the village of Russowlee and its sugarcane khets, over two miles of swamp, and five hundred yards into the thick jungles near Peroo, when, both men and horses being completely exhausted, I sounded the halt and assembly, and, collecting my wounded returned to Camp at Munjhaen about 6 P.M.

==== Further Information ====
Only one man under Lt. Baker's command was killed during this action and 17 wounded including George Bell Chicken, a civilian Master Mariner who was serving as a volunteer with the Naval Brigade.

When the report of Lt. Baker's actions reached the Commander-in-Chief of the Army in India (General Campbell) he directed his Adjutant-General to write the following to the Governor-General, Lord Canning:

"I have the honour to request, on the part of his lordship, that you will have the goodness to direct the attention of the Right Honourable the Governor-General to the brilliancy of the exploit performed by Lieutenant G. C. Baker, of the Bengal Police Battalion, which is deserving of the highest encomium, on account both of conception and execution. His lordship is of opinion that the Victoria Cross should be awarded to Lieutenant Baker, and to Mr. Chicken, of the Indian Navy, and he will take immediate measures for the execution of his intention in this respect."

=== Citation ===
For his actions on that day Lieutenant Baker was awarded the Victoria Cross. His citation reads:

For gallant conduct on the occasion of an attack on the rebels at Suhejnee, near Peroo, on the 27th September, 1858

==== Date of action ====
In the despatch sent by Lieutenant Baker to his superiors, the action is stated as taking place on 26 September 1858. The date noted in reports from his commanders, and the date noted in the London Gazette however, is 27 September 1858. The reason for this discrepancy is not known.

=== Later career ===
After the Mutiny, Baker continued to serve with the Bengal Military Police Battalion, and took part in an 1861 Expedition to Sikkim. In 1863 he was appointed as Officiating Deputy Inspector-General of Military Police for the Dacca Circle of Bengal.

After leaving India, he served in the forces of Sultan Abdul Hamid II under his namesake Valentine Baker in the Balkan theatre during the Russo-Turkish War, and was taken prisoner by the Russians. As a reward from the Sultan for his service in Turkey, Baker was given the rank of Major General and appointed Lewa Pasha. Baker then went with Valentine Baker to Egypt, working under him and eventually succeeding him as head of the Egyptian police force. He went on to become Chief of the Public Security Department of the Egyptian Ministry of the Interior, holding that post until his retirement in 1895.

== Retirement ==
After retiring from service with the Egyptian government, Major General Baker moved to Southbourne with his wife Charlotte, residing in the South Cliff Hotel on Belle Vue Road. He died on 19 February 1906 in Southbourne, and was laid to rest in Christchurch Cemetery in Dorset.
