= Montague Township =

Montague Township may refer to the following townships:

- Montague, Ontario, Canada
- Montague Township, Michigan, United States
- Montague Township, New Jersey, United States

== See also ==
- Montague (disambiguation)
