= Montagu =

Montagu may refer to:

- Montagu (surname)

== Titles of nobility ==
- Duke of Montagu
- Marquess of Montagu
  - John Neville, 1st Marquess of Montagu (c. 1431 – 1471), Yorkist leader in the Wars of the Roses
- Baron Montagu of Beaulieu
- Baron Montagu of Boughton
- Montagu Baronets, alternate name for the Baron Swaythling

== Places ==
- Montagu (Bahamas Parliament constituency)
- Montagu, South Africa
- Montagu Island, in the Southern Ocean
- Montagu Bay, Tasmania, a suburb of Hobart
- Montagu, Tasmania, a rural locality
- West Montagu, Tasmania, a rural locality

== Ships ==
- HMS Montagu, 74-gun third rate ship of the line launched in 1779 and broken up in 1818
- HMS Montagu, Duncan-class battleship launched in 1901 and wrecked in 1906

== Other uses ==
- Ashley Montagu Resolution, petition to the World Court to end the genital modification and mutilation of children
- Montagu C. Butler Library, major collection of items in and about Esperanto
- Montagu (clothing)
- Montagu's harrier, migratory bird of prey of the harrier family
- Montagu–Chelmsford Reforms, the basis of the Government of India Act 1919
- Montagu Private Equity
- Montagu Pass

== See also ==
- Montagu House (disambiguation)
- Montague (disambiguation)
- Montaign
- Montaigne (disambiguation)
- Montaigu (disambiguation)
