= George Bell Chicken =

Recipient of the Victoria Cross

- Born: 2 March 1833; Howdon Pans, Wallsend, Northumberland
- Died: May 1860 (aged 27); Bay of Bengal
- Military career
- Allegiance: United Kingdom
- Units: Indian Naval Brigade
- Conflicts: Indian Mutiny
- Awards: Victoria Cross
- Other work: Sailor

George Bell Chicken VC (2 March 1833 – May 1860) was a British sailor and a recipient of the Victoria Cross, the highest award for gallantry in the face of the enemy that can be awarded to British and Commonwealth forces. He was one of only five civilians to be awarded the VC, and was awarded the medal for actions while serving ashore as a volunteer in the Indian Naval Brigade during the Indian Mutiny in 1858. In 1860, he returned to sea, and died while in command of schooner Emily which was lost in a storm in the Bay of Bengal.

== Early life and Victoria Cross ==
Chicken was born on either 2 or 6 March 1833 at either Howdon Pans, Wallsend, Northumberland, or Bishopswearmouth, Durham. He was the son of George Chicken and his wife, Elizabeth (née Bell). During the Indian Mutiny, Chicken volunteered for service as a civilian, and on 31 July 1858, he was taken on strength at HMS Calcutta. As an acting-master, he served several months at Fort William, India, before being assigned to No. 3 Detachment of the Indian Naval Brigade. He deployed with them to Jagdispur, in Bengal, to provide artillery support.

He was 25 years old when fighting in the action that resulted in his being awarded the VC. On 27 September 1858, at Suhejnee (Sahejani), near Peroo, Bengal, Chicken was attached to a party of cavalry from the Bengal Military Police Battalion, commanded by Lieutenant Charles George Baker, and accompanied by a detachment of the 3rd Sikh Irregular Cavalry commanded by Lieutenant William Edward Delves Broughton. They routed a force of about 700 mutineers and in the pursuit which followed, Chicken forged ahead and charged into the middle of about 20 mutineers, killing five before he was forced off his horse and injured, sustaining severe wounds to his left wrist and left shoulder joints. He would have been killed if four of his fellow troopers had not arrived and rescued him.

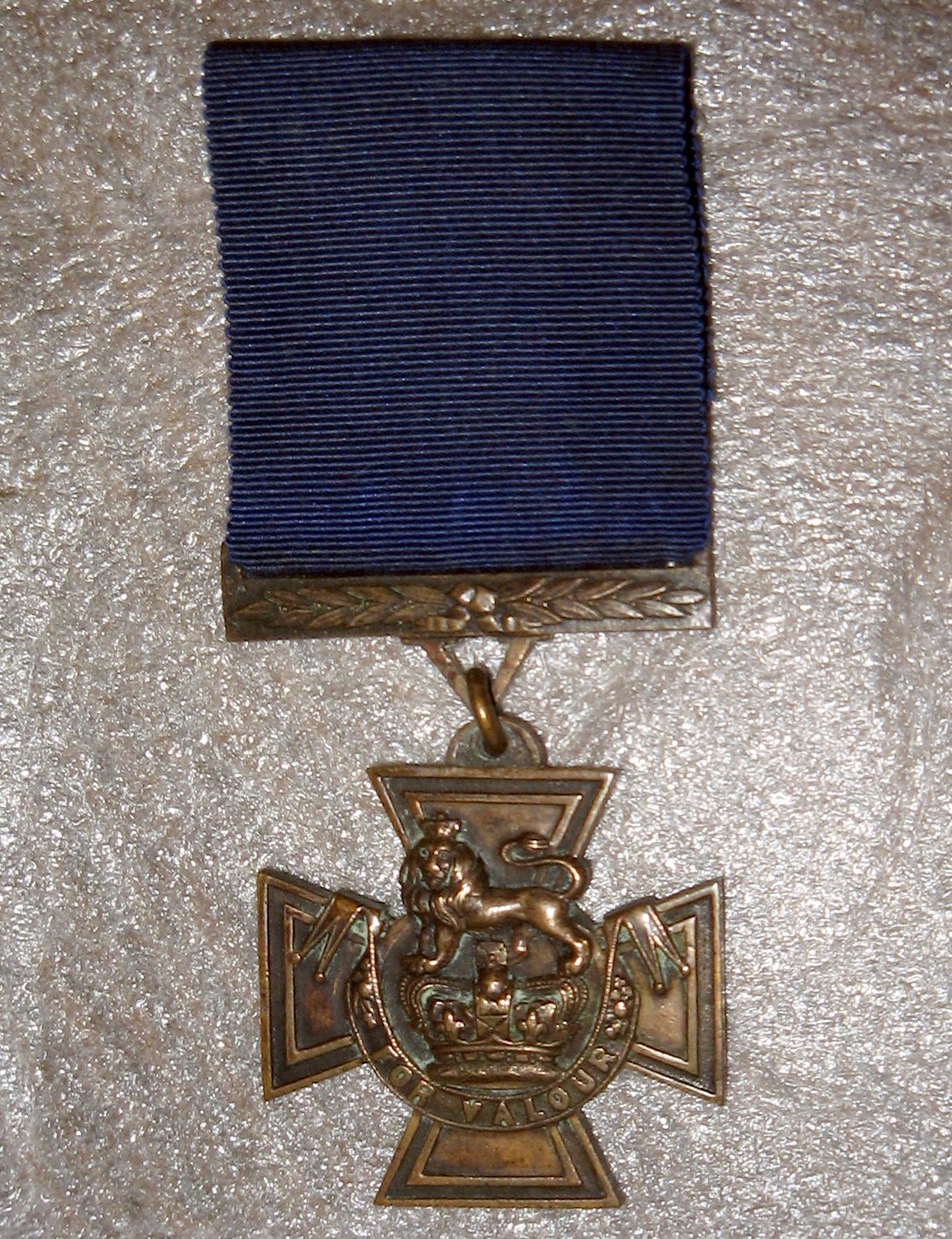
Victoria Cross (pre-1918 naval version)

Lieutenant Baker wrote the following about Chicken's conduct in a despatch to Captain Gordon, Field Adjutant, Lieutenant Colonel Turner's Field Force:

Mr. G. B. Chicken, Master, Indian Navy, of the Dehree Naval Brigade, and Lieutenant and Adjutant Nolan, of the 2nd Bengal Police Battalion, both Volunteers, doing duty with my troop, rendered me the greatest assistance and service. The former Officer, who, I regret to say, was most severely wounded, performed a very gallant act, in charging into the jungle, and attacking a body of some 20 Sepoys, who were preparing to rally and open fire upon the now scattered pursuers. Surrounded on all sides, but fighting desperately, he would have been cut to pieces, had not Lance Duffadar Kala Khan, Duffadar Ukber Khan, and Trooper Shabaz Khan, of the 1st Bengal Police Cavalry, with Trooper Dhull Sing, of the 3rd Seikh Irregular Cavalry, dashed into the crowd to his rescue, and routed it after killing several of the enemy.

A note was attached from Captain Rattray, commanding officer of the Bengal Military Police Battalion that included the following:

It is also my pleasing duty to bring forward the name of George Bell Chicken, Master, Indian Navy. This officer volunteered for service with my corps when it started from Dehree, with a determination as he expressed it, to win his medal, and nobly has he earned it; he, as Lieutenant Baker writes, charged into the middle of a considerable number of the enemy, and he succeeded in killing five before he was cut down himself. I consider this officer as well worthy the consideration of Government.

This note was forwarded to Lieutenant-Colonel W. W. Turner, Commander of the Troops on the Grand Trunk Road, who attached the following about Mr. Chicken:

I beg most respectfully and warmly to request, that the Brigadier-General will be pleased to bring to the notice of his Excellency the Commander-in-Chief, the judgement and gallantry of Lieutenant Baker, who on all former occasions has shown a marked zeal and intelligence, and the officers named by him, particularly Mr. Chicken, Master, Indian Naval Brigade, who was severely wounded.

When this note reached the Commander-in-Chief of the Army in India, Lord Clyde, the following was included in a note sent to the Governor-General Lord Canning:

I have the honour to request, on the part of his lordship, that you will have the goodness to direct the attention of the Right Honourable the Governor-General to the brilliancy of the exploit performed by Lieutenant G. C. Baker, of the Bengal Police Battalion, which is deserving of the highest encomium, on account both of conception and execution. His lordship is of opinion that the Victoria Cross should be awarded to Lieutenant Baker, and to Mr. Chicken, of the Indian Navy, and he will take immediate measures for the execution of his intention in this respect.

His citation in the London Gazette reads:

Indian Naval Brigade. For great gallantry on the 27th September, 1858, at Suhejnee, near Peroo, in having charged into the middle of a considerable number of the rebels, who were preparing to rally and open fire upon the scattered pursuers. They were surrounded on all sides, but, fighting desperately, Mr. Chicken succeeded in killing five before he was cut down himself. He would have been cut to pieces, had not some of the men of the 1st Bengal Police and 3rd Seikh Irregular Cavalry, dashed into the crowd to his rescue/and routed it, after killing several of the Enemy.

== Further information ==
Chicken was one of only five civilians to be awarded the VC. His VC is described as "the only Naval VC to be won on horse-back".

After the action at Suhejnee, Chicken served in the naval brigade for another two years. He was lost at sea in May 1860 when his schooner Emily was reportedly lost with all hands in the Bay of Bengal during bad weather.

== The medal ==
The VC was originally sent to India for presentation to Chicken; however, he died before it could be bestowed upon him and the medal subsequently went missing. As a result, another medal was struck and was sent to his father, a master mariner of Shadwell, on 4 March 1862. The VC and other items came up for sale in Canada in 1987.

In 2006, the medal – believed to be the original that was sent to India, and not the one sent to the recipient's father – was purchased by Lord Ashcroft. It is displayed as part of the collection in the Lord Ashcroft Gallery at the Imperial War Museum, London.

== Bibliography ==
- Ashcroft, Michael (2007) [2006]. Victoria Cross Heroes. Headline Review. ISBN 978-0-7553-1633-5.
- Hastings, D.J (1988). The Royal Indian Navy, 1612–1950. McFarland. ISBN 9780899502762.
- Whitworth, Alan (2015). VCs of the North: Cumbria, Durham and Northumberland. Pen & Sword. ISBN 9781473848221.
- Winton, John (2016). The Victoria Cross at Sea: The Sailors, Marines and Naval Airmen Awarded Britain's Highest Honour. Frontline Books. ISBN 9781473876156.
