= Montague (surname) =

Montague (/ˈmɒntəɡjuː/ MON-tə-ghew) is an English surname of Old French origin, a form of Montagu. Notable people with the surname include:

- Adrian Montague (born 1948), British businessman
- Sir Anderson Montague-Barlow, 1st Baronet (1868–1951), British barrister and Conservative Party politician
- Andrew Jackson Montague (1862–1937), American politician, 44th Governor of Virginia 1902–1906 and US Congressman 1912–1937
- Andrew Montague (Irish politician), Lord Mayor of Dublin 2011–2012
- Ashley Montague (1905–1999), British-American anthropologist and humanist
- Ben Montague, British musician and singer-songwriter
- Bruce Montague (1939–2022), British actor
- Charles Edward Montague (1867–1928), British journalist and author
- Daniel Montague (1867–1912), United States Navy sailor and recipient of the Medal of Honor (Spanish–American War)
- Daniel Montague (land surveyor) (1798–1876), American land surveyor, politician and soldier
- Darrell Montague (born 1987), American mixed martial artist
- Diana Montague (born 1953), British opera mezzo-soprano concert singer
- Ed Montague (shortstop) (1905–1988), US Major League Baseball infielder, later scout
- Ed Montague (umpire) (born 1948), US Major League Baseball umpire, son of the baseball player
- Edward Wortley Montague (1713–1776), British Member of Parliament, author and traveller
- Edwin Montague (1885–1937), British olympic athlete
- Edwin Montagu (1879–1924), British Liberal politician
- Eleanor Montague (1926–2018), American radiologist and educator; member of the Texas Women's Hall of Fame
- Evelyn Montague (1900–1948), British olympic athlete and journalist, son of Charles Edward Montague
- Fred Montague (1864–1919), British silent film actor
- Frederick Montague, 1st Baron Amwell (1876–1966), British Labour Party politician
- Henry Montague (1813–1909), American politician (Michigan)
- Henry James Montague, stage name for Henry James Mann (1843–1878), British-born American actor
- James Montague (bishop) (1568–1618), English bishop
- James J. Montague (1873–1941), American journalist, satirist and poet
- James Piotr Montague (born 1979), British writer and journalist
- John Montague (poet) (1929–2016), US-born Irish poet and writer
- John Montague (baseball) (born 1947) US Major League Baseball pitcher
- John Montague (golfer) (1903–1972), American golfer
- Lee Montague (1927–2025), British actor
- Magnificent Montague (born 1928), American R&B disc jockey
- Margaret Prescott Montague (1878–1955), American short story writer and novelist
- Michael Montague, Baron Montague of Oxford (1932–1999), British businessman and politician
- Monte Montague, stage name for Walter H. Montague (1891–1959), American film actor
- Raye Montague (1935–2018), United States naval engineer
- Read Montague (born 1960), American neuroscientist and popular science author
- Richard Montague (1930–1971), American mathematician and philosopher; creator of the "Montague grammar" approach to natural language semantics
- Robert Latane Montague (1819–1880), American politician from Virginia who served in the Confederate States Congress
- Robert Miller Montague (1899–1958), American soldier, Lieutenant General in the United States Army
- Robert Montague (Jamaican politician) (born 1965), Jamaican politician in the Jamaica Labour Party
- Ross Montague (born 1988), British professional footballer
- Samuel L. Montague (1829–1869), American politician, active in Cambridge, Massachusetts
- Samuel S. Montague (1830–1883), American railway pioneer, responsible for building the western half of the First Transcontinental Railroad
- Sarah Montague (born 1966), British radio journalist and Today presenter
- Stephen Montague (born 1943), American composer
- Walter Humphries Montague (1858–1915), Canadian politician in the Conservative Party of Canada
- William Pepperell Montague (1873–1953), American professor of philosophy at Berkeley and Columbia

== See also ==
- Montagu (surname)
- Montague (given name)
- McTague (surname)
