= Montague Elementary School =

Montague Elementary School may refer to:

- Montague Elementary School - Montague, Texas - Montague Independent School District
- Montague Township Elementary School - Montague Township, New Jersey - Montague Township School District

== See also ==
- Montague Village Elementary School - Fort Hood, Texas - Killeen Independent School District
- Montague Consolidated School - Montague, Prince Edward Island - Public Schools Branch (formerly in the Eastern School District)
