= Action of 14 September 1779 =

1779 battle of the American Revolutionary War

- Part of the American Revolutionary War
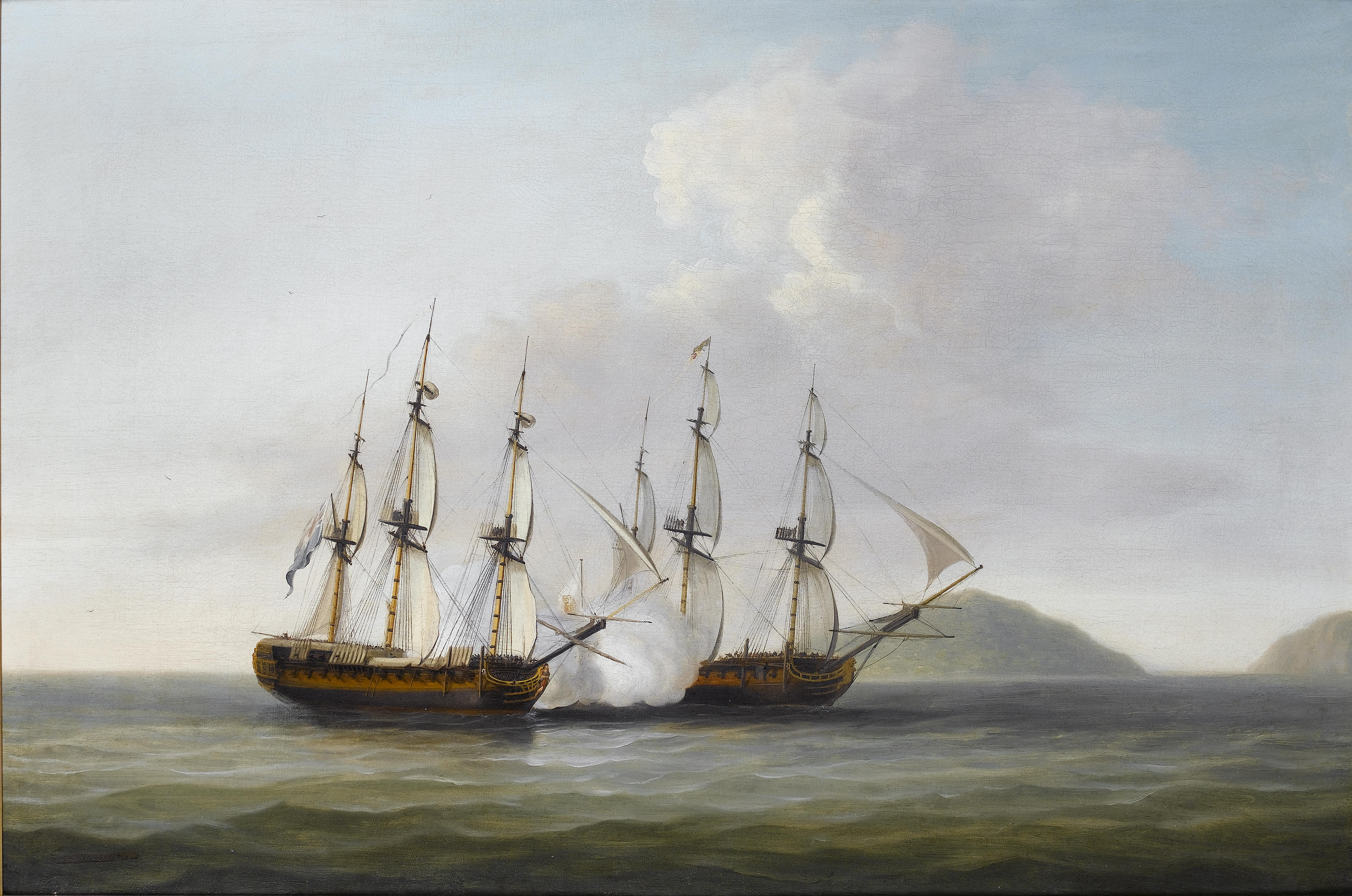
- HMS Pearl, engaging the Spanish frigate Santa Monica off the Azores, 14th. September 1779; Dominic Serres, 1781
Date	14 September 1779
Location	Off the Azores, Atlantic Ocean
Result	British victory

Belligerents
Great Britain	Spain

Commanders and leaders
George Montagu	Manuel Núñez Gaona (POW)

Strength
1 frigate	1 frigate

Casualties and losses
12 killed 19 wounded	38 killed 45 wounded 180 captured 1 frigate captured

The action of 14 September 1779 was a minor naval engagement that occurred on 14 September 1779, off the Azores between the Royal Navy frigate HMS Pearl under the command of George Montagu and the Spanish Navy frigate Santa Mónica under the command of Miguel de Nunes, with Pearl capturing Santa Mónica after a brief engagement. In September 1779, three years into the American Revolutionary War, Montagu set sail on Pearl on a cruise in the eastern fringes of the Atlantic Ocean.

On 14 September, Montagu encountered Santa Mónica sailing nearby. Pearl chased the Spanish frigate after she tried to escape, catching up with her after a two-hour chase and exchanging a furious cannonade. Both vessels were of equal size, although Santa Mónica had less cannons than Pearl, and many crewmen on the Spanish frigate had never seen action before. After outmanoeuvring and raking Santa Mónica twice, de Nunes struck his colours. The Spanish frigate was taken back to a British port.

== Background ==
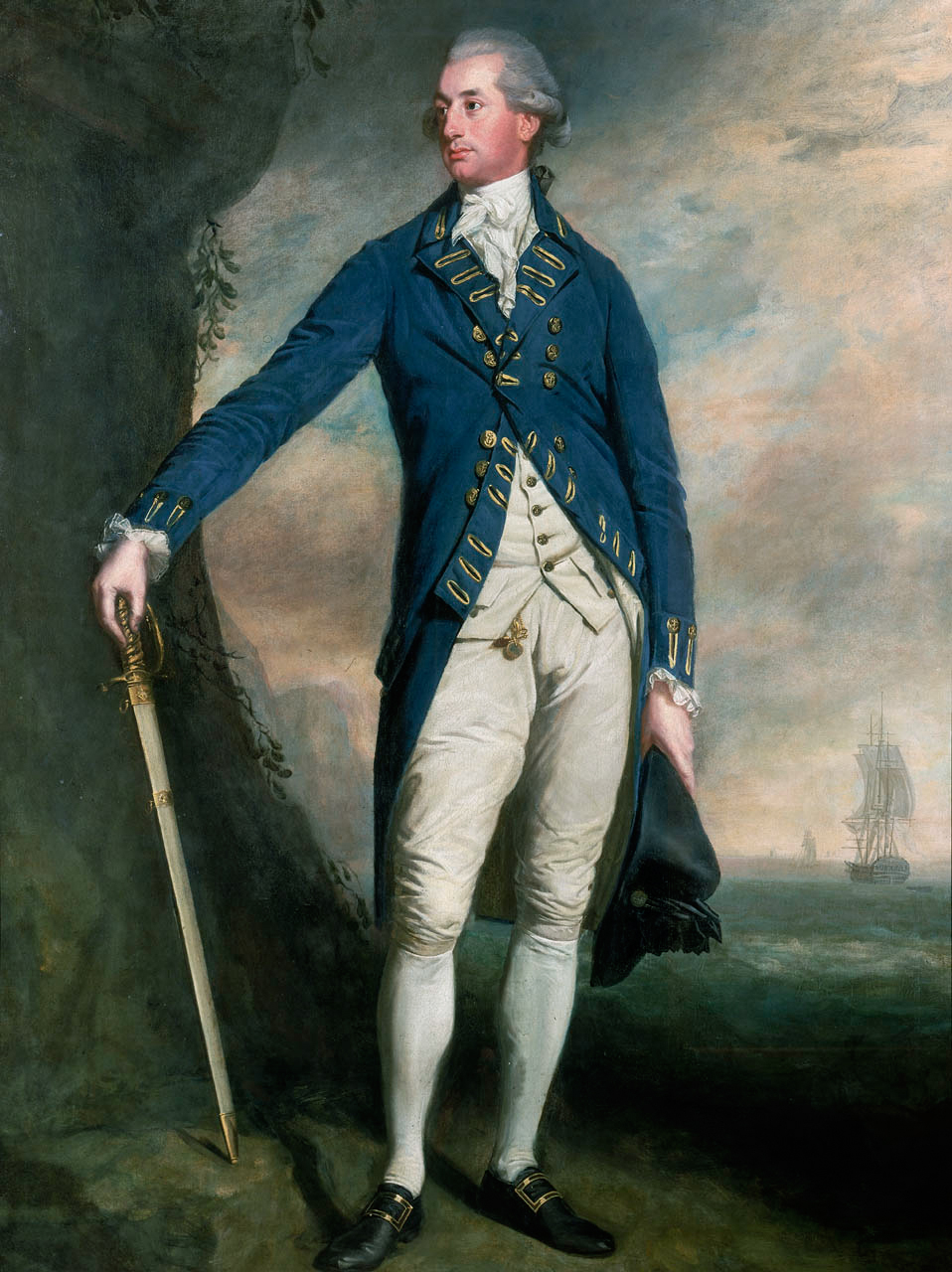
Portrait of George Montagu by Thomas Beach

In the aftermath of the Seven Years' War, Spain was forced to cede Florida (Note: Which was divided into West Florida and East Florida.) and Menorca in the Treaty of Paris to the British, gaining back Havana and Manila in return. The war marked a humiliating downfall from the height of Spanish military ascendancy during the War of the Austrian Succession, and forced the King of Spain Charles III to undergo a military review of his armed forces. This resulted in a massive reorganization of the Spanish military from the top down. Spain entered the American Revolutionary War on the side of the Americans, eager to avenge their earlier defeat, and laid siege to Gibraltar along with dispatching expeditions to re-capture Florida and Menorca. The Royal Navy dispatched naval forces to the Atlantic Ocean to resupply the garrison of Gibraltar and ensure Spanish forces did not hold command of the seas, which would have certainly led to the capture of the "gateway to the Mediterranean".

Since July 1779, the Spanish Navy had conducted naval patrols near the Azores to search for British ships in the area. The force dispatched consisted of a small squadron of warships under the command of Lieutenant-general Don Antonio de Ulloa. The ships under his command were made up of four ships of the line: his 80-gun flagship Fenix (famed for bringing the young Charles III from Naples to Barcelona), Gallardo, Diligent and San Julián, and the frigates Santa Maria and Santa Mónica. The British commander, George Montagu, had received his first command in 1771 at the age of 21. In 1779, he was given command of the frigate HMS Pearl. On 14 September, while Montagu was cruising off the Azores in the early hours of the morning, he spotted a large Spanish ship. He gave to order to give chase to the ship, and after a two-hour chase caught up to her and identified her as a Spanish frigate, with both ships readying themselves for the ensuing battle.

== Battle ==
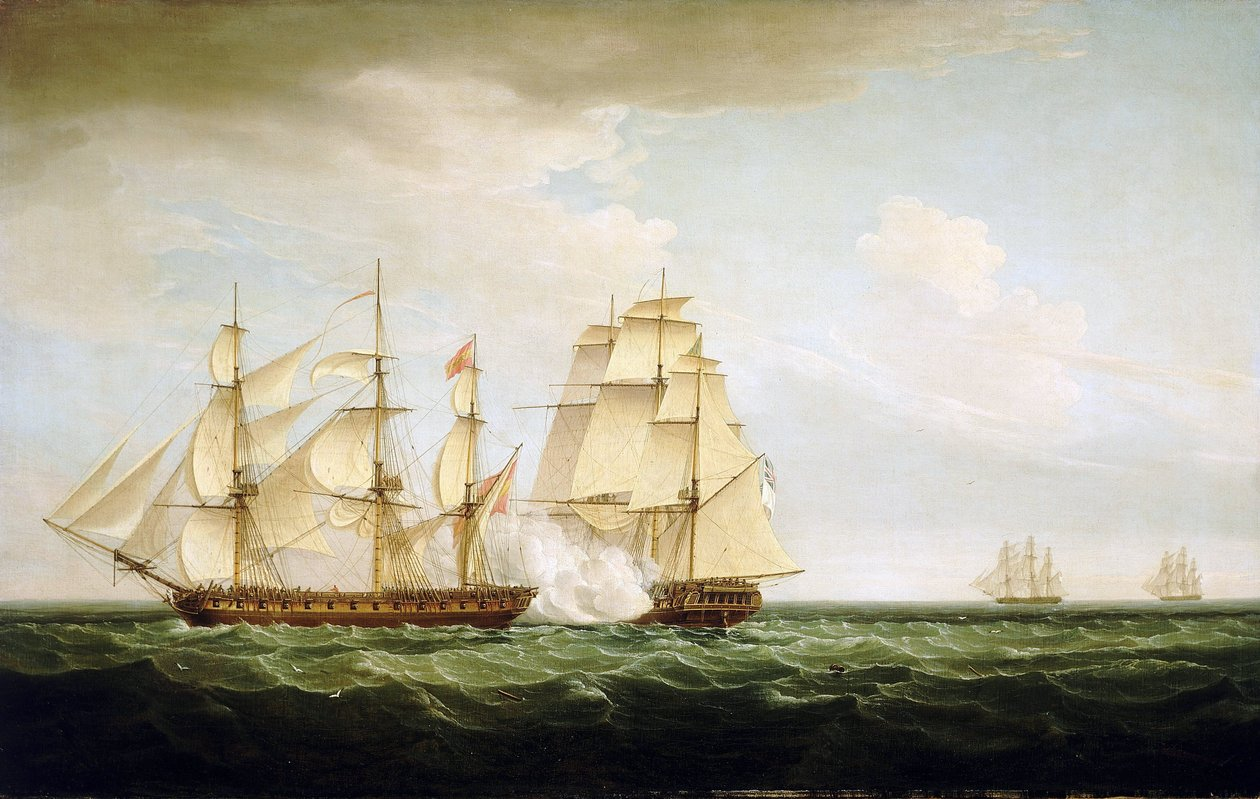
HMS Pearl and the Santa Monica, 14 September 1779, by Thomas Whitcombe

At 09:30 in the morning, Pearl finally caught up with Santa Mónica. With the Pearl bearing down on him, de Nunes readied his ship for battle, meeting the approaching British frigate with a broadside, commencing the action. Both ships were evenly matched in most regards, although the Pearl, being a newly commissioned ship, had only ten men onboard who had actually had service on board a man-of-war before, while the Santa Mónica had less cannons than her British opponent. The battle went on for some time, with both frigates suffering increasing casualties and damage to their rigging. Despite having a less skilled crew under his command compared to the Spanish warship, Montagu's men were able to inflict significantly more damage to the Spanish frigate than they were receiving in return. During the engagement, Montagu managed to direct his ship into a position where he could rake the Santa Mónica, with de Nunes being unable to stop the Pearl from raking her twice.

After fighting for two hours, Santa Mónica had taken severe damage to both her rigging and her hull, and had suffered thirty-eight men killed and forty-five wounded; realizing that he was unable to win this battle and unwilling to sacrifice the lives of more of his men, de Nunes struck his colours to the British. The whole engagement lasted roughly the average length of single-ship actions. After de Nunes struck his colours, Montagu sent a prize crew on board the Santa Mónica to take possession of her. As per custom, de Nunes presented his sword to Montagu to signal his surrender. The two frigates than sailed back to a British port, with the weather being calm enough that neither ship foundered due to the damage they suffered in the battle. Pearl had suffered little damage overall except in her rigging; in addition, she had suffered a loss of twelve men killed and nineteen wounded. The surviving crew of the Pearl were awarded appropriate prize money from valuables taken from the captured Spanish ship.

== Aftermath ==
The captured Spanish prisoners, numbering one hundred and eighty in all, were brought ashore as prisoners of war, and were eventually exchanged for British prisoners held by the Spanish after the Treaty of Amiens was signed between the United Kingdom and Spain (among others) in 1802. After news reached the Spanish Admiralty of the loss of the Santa Mónica, Ulloa was court martialled in Cádiz for the loss of one of the ships under his command. During the court martial, which took place in October, he was honourably acquitted for the loss of his ship. While she safely in port, the Santa Mónica was given a thorough examination by the British. She was a newly constructed ship (just like the Pearl), mounting twenty-six long twelve-pounder guns on her main deck, and two four-pounder guns on her quarterdeck, with a crew of two hundred and seventy-one men in total. Santa Mónica was also of a significantly larger size than the Pearl, which was an unrealized advantage that de Nunes had during the engagement. The Royal Navy decided to take the Santa Mónica into service as HMS Santa Monica. She saw no action, and was wrecked off the coast of Tortola on 1 April 1782, ending her brief career.

Montagu continued his service in the war. In December 1779, the Pearl set sail with a British squadron under Admiral George Rodney, and on 8 January assisted in the capture of a large Spanish convoy; but having sprung her foremast during the battle, was ordered to sail back home with the captured prizes. Montagu also saw action at the Battle of Cape Henry under Mariot Arbuthnot, which was proved to be his last battle before the conclusion of the war. He later saw service again at the Glorious First of June, where his actions during the battle engendered controversy thanks to his refusal to heed orders given by the British commander, Earl Howe. Despite the eventual British victory against the Franco-Spanish siege of Gibraltar, the Americans proved unable to be defeated and the British decided to end the war by recognizing the independence of the American colonies. The effects of the revolution would go on to have a profound impact on Europe, which would eventually lead to the French Revolution, paving the way for the French Revolutionary Wars.

== Order of battle ==
Ship	Commander	Navy	Guns	Casualties		
Ship	Commander	Navy	Guns	Killed	Wounded	Total
HMS Pearl	George Montagu		32	12	19	31
Santa Mónica (captured)	Miguel de Nunes (POW)		28	38	45	83

== Bibliography ==
- Beatson, Robert (1804). Naval and Military Memoirs of Great Britain, From 1727 to 1783. Vol. 6. Longman, Hurst, Rees and Orme.
- Winfield, Rif (2007). British Warships of the Age of Sail 1714–1792: Design, Construction, Careers and Fates. Seaforth. ISBN 978-1-86176-295-5.
