= Montaigu =

Montaigu or Montaigut may refer to:

== Places ==
=== Belgium ===
- the French exonym for Scherpenheuvel

=== France ===
- Montaigu, Aisne, in the Aisne département
- Montaigu, Jura, in the Jura département
- Montaigu, Vendée, in the Vendée département
- Montaigu-de-Quercy, in the Tarn-et-Garonne département
- Montaigu-la-Brisette, in the Manche département
- Montaigu-le-Blin, in the Allier département
- Montaigu-les-Bois, in the Manche département
- Montaigu-Vendée, in the Vendée département
- Montaigut, Puy-de-Dôme, in the Puy-de-Dôme département
- Montaigut-le-Blanc, Creuse, in the Creuse département
- Montaigut-le-Blanc, Puy-de-Dôme, in the Puy-de-Dôme département
- Montaigut-sur-Save, in the Haute-Garonne département
- Château de Montaigut at Gissac in the Aveyron département

== Other uses ==
- Collège de Montaigu, a constituent college of the Faculty of Arts of the University of Paris
- Counts of Montaigu, a French noble family of the 11th and 12th centuries
- Sofia Achaval de Montaigu, Argentine designer, stylist, editor, and model
- Thibault de Montaigu, French writer and journalist

== See also ==
- Montagu (disambiguation)
- Montague (disambiguation)
