= Montague Island =

Montague Island may refer to:

- Barunguba / Montague Island, New South Wales, Australia
- Montague Island (Alaska), U.S.
- Montague Island (Baja California), Mexico
- Montague Island, former name of Peel Island, Cumbria, England

== See also ==
- Montague (disambiguation)
- Montagu Island
