= McTague (surname) =

McTague is a surname. Notable people with the surname include:

- Mary-Ellen McTague, British chef
- Mike McTague (born 1957), Canadian former professional football player
- Timothy McTague, American guitarist
- Tom McTague, British author and journalist
- Tony McTague (born 1946), Irish Gaelic footballer

== See also ==
- Montague (surname)
