= Charles Montague =

Charles Montague may refer to:

- Charles Edward Montague (1867–1928), English journalist and author
- Charles Montague Bakewell (1867–1957), American professor and politician
- Charles Montague Cooke (1849–1909), businessman in the Kingdom of Hawaii
- Charles Montague Cooke Jr. (1874–1948), American malacologist
- Charles Montague Ede (1865–1925), Hong Kong businessman and politician
- C. Montague Shaw (Charles Montague Shaw, 1882–1968), Australian actor

== See also ==
- Charles Montagu (disambiguation)
