= Sappho (1785 ship) =

British merchant ship and whaler (1785–1798)

History

Great Britain
- Name: Sappho
- Namesake: Sappho
- Builder: Shields
- Launched: 1785
- Fate: Last listed 1798

General characteristics
- Tons burthen: 139, or 200 (bm)
- Armament: 2 × 4-pounder guns (post–1793)

Sappho was launched at Shields in 1785. She spent most of her career trading with the Baltic, though she made some voyages elsewhere, and in particular, between 1788 and 1799 she made a voyage to the Falkland Islands as a whaler. She was last listed in 1798, having perhaps been captured in late 1797.

== Career ==
Sappho first appeared in Lloyd's Register in 1786.

Year	Master	Owner	Trade	Source
1786	Sanderson	T.Weir	Gothenburg–London	LR
1787	Sanderson; T.Middleton	T.Weir; Ogle & Co.	Gothenburg–London; London–Southern Fishery	LR

Whaling voyage (1787–1789): Captain Thomas Middleton sailed from London on 5 December 1787, bound for the Falkland Islands. In April 1789 Sappho and Elizabeth and Mary, James Hopper, master, were in Port Desire when a Spanish frigate arrived and confiscated thousands of seal skins they had gathered. Sappho herself had to give up some 7,000 seal skins. In April 1789 she put into Port Desire for water and repairs. Sappho returned to London on 16 July 1789 with one tun of sperm oil, eight tuns of whale oil, four cwt whale bone, and 19,000 seal skins.

Year	Master	Owner	Trade	Source
1790	G.Middleton; W.Moody	Horncastle	London–Petersburg	LR
1793	W.Moody; Illegible; J.French	Horncastle; G.Kendal	London–Ostend; London–Lisbon	LR
1794	J.French; J.Greathead	G.Kedall	London–Lisbon	LR
1795	Greathed	Kendall	London–Pernambuco	LR
1796	Greethed	Kendall	London–Riga	LR

== Fate ==
Sappho was last listed in 1798 with data unchanged from 1796.

A French privateer captured and took into Bordeaux in 1797 a Sappho, Elliot, master, as Sappho was sailing from Lisbon to Limerick. Although at the time Sappho was a unique name in Lloyd's Register, it may require original research to determine whether the captured Sappho was the Sappho of this article.
