= HMS Terror (1741) =

History

Great Britain
- Name: HMS Terror
- Ordered: 14 September 1741
- Builder: Greville & Whestone, Limehouse
- Laid down: 9 October 1741
- Fate: Sold in 1754

General characteristics
- Tons burthen: 27145/94, or 278 (bm)
- Length: Overall:91 ft 9 in (28.0 m); Keel:74 ft 11 in (22.8 m)
- Beam: 26 ft 5 in (8.1 m)
- Depth of hold: 11 ft 2 in (3.4 m)
- Propulsion: Sail
- Sail plan: Bomb: Ketch; Sloop: Sloop
- Complement: Bomb:60; Sloop:100
- Armament: Bomb:8 × 4-pounder guns + 12 × ½-pounder swivel guns + 1 × 13" & 1 × 10" mortar; Sloop:10 × 44-pounder guns + 14 × ½-pounder swivel guns

History

Great Britain
- Name: Duke of York
- Renamed: Elizabeth and Margaret (1784)
- Fate: Last listed 1794

General characteristics
- Tons burthen: 200, or 250, or 280, or 288 (bm)
- Armament: 1776: 18 guns; 1779: 8 × 4-pounder guns

HMS Terror was a bomb vessel launched in 1741, converted to a sloop, and sold in 1754. She went into mercantile service, becoming the northern whale fishery whaler Duke of York. In 1784 her name changed to Elizabeth and Margaret, and she continued as a Greenland whaler, before becoming a whaler in the British southern whale fishery. She was last listed in 1794.

== Royal Navy ==
Commander Abraham Duncomb commissioned Terror in March 1742. Commander John Moore was captain of Terror from 26 February 1742 to 5 May 1743.

From 6 May 1743 to 14 May 1744 she was under the command of Commander James Broadley and engaged in taking soundings and serving with Admiral Norriss's fleet in the Channel. In 1744 Norris was asked to defend Britain from an imminent French invasion. While he was preparing, storms scattered the invasion transports, with heavy loss of life, and ended the immediate threat. Terror and her tender were themselves wrecked on the Sussex coast, but salvaged.

On 4 December 1744 Robert Duff was promoted to Commander. He recommissioned Terror in that month.

In 1745 Terror was re-rated as a sloop.

In March 1746 Terror landed troops from Mingary Castle, which was being used as a barracks, who carried out raids on Morvern, known as the burning of Morvern punishing Jacobite supporters.

Terror was involved in the Skirmish of Loch nan Uamh during the Jacobite rising, where a broadside from the French privateer French privateer Bellone disabled her.

Duff left Terror on 22 October 1746. Commander T. Riggs succeeded him on 23 October. Commander G.Hudson succeeded Riggs on 16 February 1747.

Disposal: Terror was paid off in June 1748. She underwent several surveys in succeeding years until on 29 September 1754 the Navy ordered her to be sold for £203. She was sold on 3 December at Deptford.

== Mercantile service ==
=== Duke of York ===
The entry for Duke of York in the 1764 volume of Lloyd's Register (LR) noted that she was the former Terror bomb, built in 1740 in a King's Yard (i.e., she had been built for the Royal Navy). (Note: The 1764 volume is the earliest volume of LR available online. The next available volume is for 1768, but the pages that would include Duke of York are missing.)

Year	Master	Owner	Trade	Source
1764	D.Wharton	Manby & Co.	Greenland	LR

Data on Greenland whaling voyages shows Duke of York having engaged in whaling from 1762 on.

Year	Master	Where	Whales	Tuns whale oil
1762			0	0
1763			3	44
1764			1	15.5
1765			1	20
1766			2	37
1767			0	0
1768			0	4.5
1769			7	82.5
1770	Bourfloor	Greenland	5.5	85
1771			3	20
1772			5	100
1773			1	24
1774			2	90
1775			0	12
1776			3	49.5

The next available issues of LR were the volumes for 1776, 1778, and 1779. Duke of York left whaling for some years, serving as a transport instead, before returning to the Greenland whale fishery.

Year	Master	Owner	Trade	Source & notes
1776	Rh Petrie	W.Kilbinton	London–Greenland	LR; large repairs 1770, 1772, & 1774
1778	J.Graham	W.Kilbinton	Cork transport	LR; large repairs 1770, 1772, & 1774
1779	J.Graham; H.Clow	W.Kilbinton	Transport London; London–Greenland	LR; large repairs 1770, 1772, 1774, & 1777

Year	Master	Where	Whales	Tuns whale oil
1779			8	62.5
1780			7	70
1781			10	59.5
1782			7.5	85
1783			12	70
1784			10	59.5

=== Elizabeth and Margaret ===
LR for 1784 showed Duke of York's name changing to Elizabeth and Margaret, though she remained a Greenland whaler.

Year	Master	Owner	Trade	Source & notes
1784 (ex-Duke of York)	H.Clow	Lucas & Co.	London–Greenland	LR; large repairs 1770, 1772, 1777, & 1778, and repairs 1782
1784 (Elizabeth and Margaret)	H.Clow	Lucas & Co.	London–Greenland	LR; "fev" repairs and good repair 1784

Year	Master	Where	Whales	Tuns whale oil
1785	Clow	Greenland	4	3.5
1786			3	70
1787			3	70
1788	Dodd	Greenland	4	37.5

In 1788 Elizabeth and Margaret's owners (Joseph Lucas & Christopher Spencer), decided to cease fishing in the northern whale fishery and to try the southern whale fishery instead.

Year	Master	Owner	Trade	Source & notes
1789	J.Hopper	Lucas & Co.	London–Southern Fisherry	LR; large repairs 1770, 1772, 1774, 1777, & 1778, and good repairs 1782 & 1788

1st southern whaling voyage (1788–1789): Captain James Hopper sailed from London on 16 October 1788, bound for the coast of Patagonia. In April 1789 Elizabeth and Margaret and Sappho were in Port Desire when a Spanish frigate arrived and confiscated thousands of seal skins they had gathered. Sappho returned to England in July 1990 and Elizabeth and Margaret may have also returned about the same time.

2nd southern whaling voyage (1789–1790): Elizabeth and Margaret, Captain James Hopper, may have sailed for the southern fishery in 1789. On 22 February 1790 Elizabeth and Margaret and Lucy were at Table Bay when HMS Guardian arrived in great distress and unable to make her way into safety. Elizabeth and Margaret and Lucy (Captain William Gardiner Dyer), and some other whalers despatched seven boats and helped bring her in. Elizabeth and Margaret returned via Saint Helena and Cabo Verde, arriving back in London on 20 September 1790.

3rd southern whaling voyage (1790–1792): Captain Hopper sailed from London on 28 December 1790, bound for the southern fishery. Elizabeth and Margaret returned on 19 May 1792.

== Fate ==
Elizabeth and Margaret was last listed in 1794, with data unchanged since 1788. She did not appear in Lloyd's List's ship arrival and departure data in 1793–1794.
