= Clan Rattray =

Highland Scottish clan

- Motto: Super sidera votum (My wishes are above the stars)

Chief
- Lachlan Rattray
- of Rattray
- Seat: Craighall
- Historic seat: Rattray Castle
Allied clans
Clan Hay
Clan Stewart (17th and 18th centuries)
Rival clans
Clan Stewart (16th century)

Clan Rattray is a Highland Scottish clan.

== History ==
=== Origins of the clan ===
The name Rattray is taken from the barony of Rattray in Perthshire. This barony has been in their possession since the eleventh century. The Rattray estate includes the ruins of a pict rath-tref or fort dwelling. It stands on a sandy mound which is associated by local tradition with Pagan rites.

The first recorded Laird of Rattray was Alan who witnessed charters by William the Lion and Alexander II of Scotland.

=== Wars of Scottish Independence ===
During the Wars of Scottish Independence, Alan's grandson, Eustace Rattray, was captured at the Battle of Dunbar (1296) and taken to England as a prisoner. Eustace's son was Adam Rattray who swore fealty to Edward I of England, appearing on the Ragman Rolls of 1296. Adam was succeeded by his son, Alexander Rattray, who was amongst the barons who sat in the Parliament at Ayr to determine the succession to the throne in 1315. Alexander was succeeded by his brother, Eustace, the sixth Laird of Rattray, who was accused of being involved in a plot to depose Robert the Bruce, but he was later acquitted.

=== 15th and 16th centuries ===
In 1463 Sir Silvester Rattray of Rattray was an ambassador to England and inherited from his mother large estates around Fortingall in Atholl. This caused the powerful Stewart Earl of Atholl to be jealous. Silvester Rattray was succeeded by his son, John, who had been knighted in 1488 by James IV of Scotland. His eldest son died serving in the Netherlands as a professional soldier but he left another two sons and two daughters. The eldest of the two daughters was Grizel who had married John Stewart, Earl of Atholl and the earl promptly claimed half of the barony of Rattray in her right. The earl also induced his wife's sister, Elizabeth, to try to obtain her share of the Rattray barony. Sir John Rattray's second son, Patrick Rattray, was driven from Rattray Castle in 1516 by the Earl of Atholl and was forced to take refuge in Nether Kinballoch where he built a new house at Craighall. However the Stewart Earl of Atholl murdered him in 1533.

The third son of Sir John Rattray was another Silvester Rattray who succeeded his murdered brother. Due to the Earl of Atholl's continuing threats he petitioned to the king for dispensation to be legally recognised in the courts in Dundee instead of Perth where the Earl of Atholl had great influence and Silvester considered the visit too dangerous.

Silvester Rattray was succeeded by his son, David Rattray of Craighall, who had three sons. The second son was another Silvester Rattray who was Reverend of Persie and became the first minister of Rattray after the Scottish Reformation. The eldest son, George, was murdered in 1592 and so Silvester, the younger son, succeeded to the title.

=== 17th century and Civil War ===
Silvester Rattray was tutored by his uncle, the Reverend John Rattray and allied himself to the powerful Earls of Erroll, chiefs of Clan Hay. He died in 1612 leaving three sons. The eldest son was David Rattray who fought for Charles I of England during the Scottish Civil War and as a result his seat at Craighall endured a short siege. The youngest son was John Rattray who was captured at the Battle of Worcester in 1651 after the defeat of Charles II of England, then imprisoned in the Tower of London.

The Rattrays sought to consolidate their lands and in 1648 Patrick Rattray obtained a new charter to their lands under the great seal which united the barony of Kinballoch with Rattray and their other associated parishes into the one free barony of Craighall-Rattray. In 1682 the new barony passed to Patrick's eldest son and also laid claim to the Rattray lands that had been sized by the Stewart Earl of Atholl in the 16th century.

James Rattray of Rannagulzion and Corb fought at the Battle of Killiecrankie in 1689. Referred to as James, son of David Rattray of Rannagullane.

=== 18th century and Jacobite risings ===
Patrick Rattray's only son, Thomas Rattray, entered the Church and rose to be the Bishop of Brechin (then of Dunkeld) and became Primus of Scotland in 1739. Thomas was a Jacobite and his second son, John Rattray, was the physician to the Jacobite leader, Charles Edward Stuart, following him throughout the Jacobite rising of 1745. He was captured after the Battle of Culloden but upon the intervention of Duncan Forbes, Lord Culloden he was reprieved. The bishop's eldest son, James Rattray, sheltered Jacobite fugitives at Craighall.

James Rattray of Rannagulzion was commissioned as a major of foot in the Atholl brigade in the 1745 rising. See commission into Prince Charles's army as a Major of foot in Tullibardines regiment National Library of Scotland. Served in the Ogilvie regiment.

=== 19th century and the British Empire ===
Col. Thomas Rattray, C.S.I., C.B., B.S.C. (a Rattray of Rannagulzion) commanded the Governor-General's bodyguard cavalry and is well known for having raised a new police battalion, known as the Bengal Military Police Battalion, at Lahore on 15 April 1856, which distinguished itself throughout the Indian Mutiny. This famous battalion, which was regularised as an infantry unit in the British Indian Army as the 45th Rattray's Sikhs in the 1860s, later became the 3rd Battalion 11th Sikh Regiment in 1922 and then the 3rd battalion the Sikh Regiment (Rattray's) in the modern Indian army.

The twenty-second and twenty-third Lairds of Rattray died without heirs and the estate then passed to a cousin, the Honourable James Clerk Rattray, sheriff depute of Edinburgh. James Clerk Rattray, the twenty-sixth Laird was a distinguished soldier who rose to the rank of general and who in 1897 was created a Knight of the Bath. He served during the Crimean War and during the Indian Mutiny of 1857.

== Clan Chief ==
The Chief of Clan Rattray is Lachlan Rattray of Rattray who is the 29th Chief of Clan Rattray. Lachlan Rattray of Rattray is a current member of the Standing Council of Scottish Chiefs.

== Castle and Seat ==
The seat of the chief of Clan Rattray is still at Craighall-Rattray. Their historic seat was at Rattray Castle.

== Clan Septs ==
The septs of the Clan Rattray include: Rannagulzion, Dalrulzion, Brewlands, Persie and Beatts.

Variations in spelling include Ratray, Ratre, Ratteray, Ratteree, Ratterree, Retrey, Rettra, Rettray, and Rotray.

== See also ==
- Scottish clan
