= John Montague =

John Montague is the name of:

- John Montague (poet) (1929–2016), Irish poet and writer
- John Montague (baseball) (born 1947), baseball relief pitcher
- John Montague (golfer) (1903–1972), American golfer

== See also ==
- John Montagu (disambiguation)
