= Edward Montagu =

Edward Montagu may refer to:

- Edward Montagu, 1st Baron Montagu (died 1361), English peer
- Sir Edward Montagu (judge) (c. 1488–1557), English lawyer and judge
- Sir Edward Montagu of Boughton (1532–1601/1602) of Boughton House
- Edward Montagu, 1st Baron Montagu of Boughton (1560–1644), son of the above
- Edward Montagu, 2nd Earl of Manchester (1602–1671),
- Edward Montagu, 1st Earl of Sandwich (1625–1672), English landowner, military officer and politician
- Edward Montagu, 2nd Earl of Sandwich (1648–1688)
- Edward Montagu, 2nd Baron Montagu of Boughton (1616–1684), Baron Montagu of Boughton House
- Edward Montagu (died 1665) (c. 1636–1665), English MP for Sandwich
- Edward Montagu (1649–1690), English MP for Northamptonshire and Seaford
- Edward Montagu (1672–1710), English MP for Chippenham
- Edward Montagu, Viscount Hinchingbrooke (1692–1722)
- Edward Montagu, 3rd Earl of Sandwich (1670–1729)
- Edward Montagu (died 1738) (after 1684–1738), British MP for Northampton
- Edward Montagu (1692–1776), British MP for Huntingdon
- Edward Wortley Montagu (traveller) (1713–1776), English author and traveller
- Sir Edward Wortley Montagu (diplomat) (1678–1761), British diplomat
- Edward Hussey-Montagu, 1st Earl Beaulieu (1721–1802), British peer and politician
- Edward Montagu (Indian Army officer) (1755–1799)
- Edward Montagu, 5th Baron Rokeby (1787–1847)
- Edward Montagu, 8th Earl of Sandwich (1839–1916), Conservative politician and author (known as Viscount Hinchingbrooke until 1884)
- Edward Douglas-Scott-Montagu, 3rd Baron Montagu of Beaulieu (1926–2015), English politician

== See also ==
- Ed Montague (disambiguation)
- Edwin Samuel Montagu (1879–1924), British politician
