= Robert Duff (Royal Navy officer) =

Vice-Admiral Robert Duff
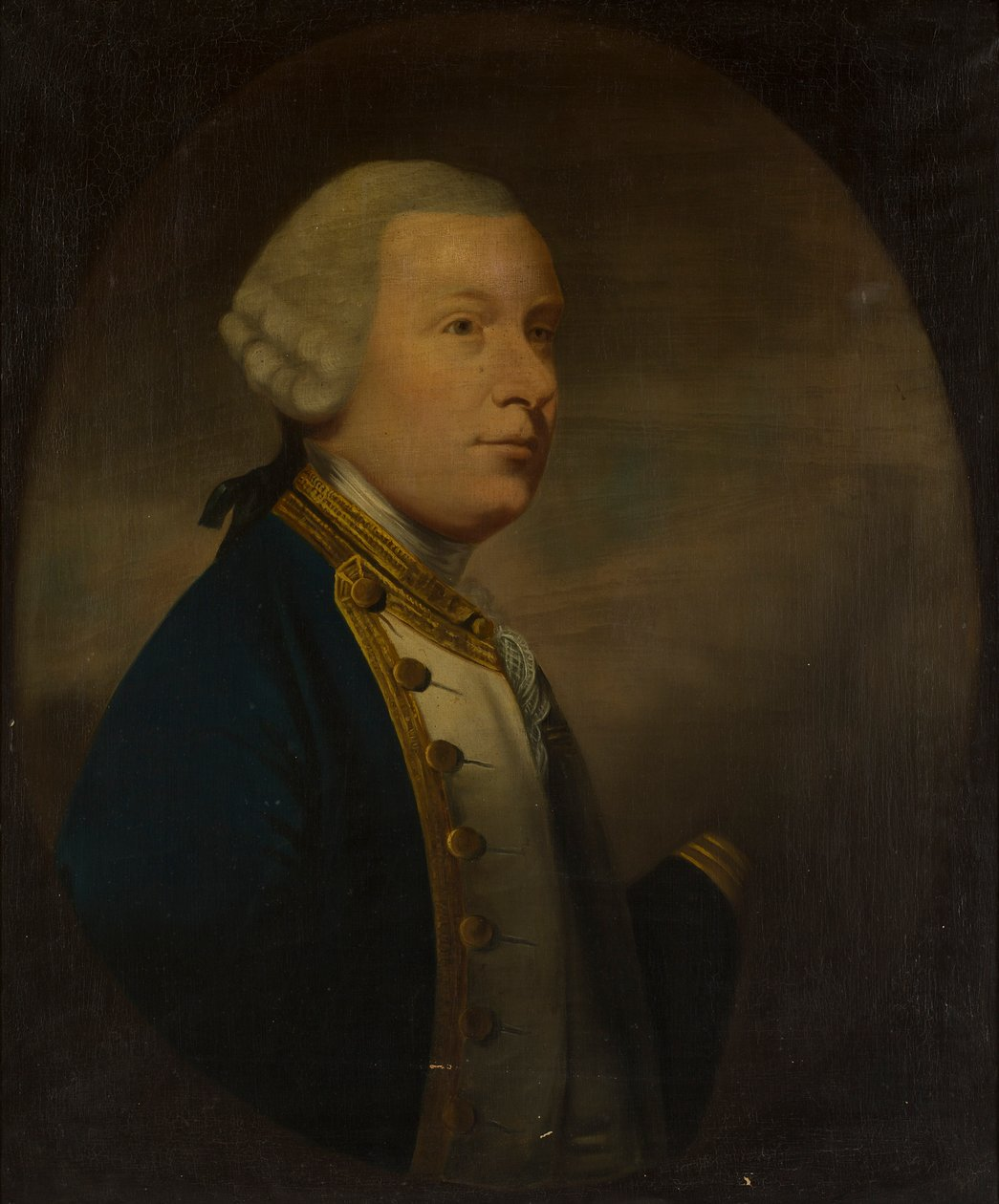
- Portrait by Tilly Kettle
- Born: c. 1721
- Died: 6 June 1787; Queensferry, Scotland
- Relatives: William Duff, 1st Earl Fife (cousin); George Duff (grandnephew); Norwich Duff (great-grandnephew); Robert Duff (great-grandson)
- Military career
- Allegiance: Great Britain
- Branch: Royal Navy
- Rank: Vice admiral
- Commands: HMS Terror; HMS Anglesea; HMS Rochester; HMS Foudroyant
- Conflicts: War of the Austrian Succession; Seven Years' War; American Revolutionary War

Viceregal styles of Robert Duff
- Reference style: His Excellency
- Spoken style: Your Excellency

Vice-Admiral Robert Duff (c. 1721 – 6 June 1787) was a Royal Navy officer and colonial administrator who served in the War of the Austrian Succession, Seven Years' War and American War of Independence. He briefly served as colonial governor of Newfoundland.

== Family and early life ==
Duff was born c. 1721, among the youngest of more than thirty children of Patrick Duff of Craigston in Aberdeenshire (about 7 miles (11 km) west of Aberdeen, just north-northeast of Westhill), by Craigston's second wife. Little is known about his early life, but a story that does survive attests to his father's fecundity and possibly also to Robert's own spirited approach. Walking in his garden the father, Patrick Duff, came across a small boy and enquired 'And wha's laddie are you?' to which his son, the future Admiral Robert Duff, replied 'Dinna ye ken your ain son Robbie, ye auld fool!'. Robert joined the navy and was listed a lieutenant by 9 March 1739. He was advanced to commander on 4 December 1744, and by 1746 was in command of the bomb vessel HMS Terror, serving off the Scottish coast. Duff received the command of the 44-gun Anglesea on 23 October, and remained in her off the Irish and English coasts until the signing of the Treaty of Aix-la-Chapelle in 1748 that ended the War of the Austrian Succession.

== Seven Years' War ==
Duff's next ship was the 50-gun HMS Rochester, which he joined in 1755. He spent several years cruising, either independently or as part of the main fleet, and in 1758 was part of Commodore Richard Howe's squadron defending the expeditions against St Malo, Cherbourg and St Cas. He became senior officer of a small squadron stationed off Brittany in 1759, watching the French fleet in Morbihan, while a fleet under Edward Hawke blockaded Brest, France. While at anchor in Quiberon Bay on 20 November, his scouts reported a large French fleet to the south of Belle Île. Duff hurried his squadron, consisting of four 50-gun ships and four frigates, out to sea while the French chased them. Before they could be caught, the main fleet under Hawke came up and overran the French, defeating them in the decisive Battle of Quiberon Bay.

Duff was then appointed to the 80-gun HMS Foudroyant and went out with her to the West Indies with Rear-Admiral George Brydges Rodney's fleet. Duff saw action at the capture of Martinique during January and February 1762, but owing to his seniority, he refused to serve as Rodney's flag-captain, and was sent home. In 1764 he married Helen Duff, the daughter of his cousin, the first Earl of Fife. Duff was promoted to rear-admiral of the blue on 31 March 1775, and in April was sent out as commander-in-chief at Newfoundland. His posting was brief, in 1776 he became rear-admiral of the white and in September 1777 he was appointed to the command of the Mediterranean Fleet, with the 60-gun HMS Panther as his flagship.

== American War of Independence ==
By now a rear-admiral of the red, he supported the British forces defending Gibraltar from Don Antonio Barcelo's fleet when the siege there broke out in 1779, but had limited forces at his disposal and he was recalled early in 1780. He had been promoted to vice-admiral of the blue on 29 January 1778, and was advanced to vice-admiral of the white later that year, but held no further command after his return to England in 1780.

== Later years and death ==
His portrait was painted by Sir Joshua Reynolds for Greenwich Hospital. Increasingly ill with gout during his later years, he died at Queensferry on 6 June 1787, his death being attributed to an attack of gout in the stomach. He had a number of children by his marriage to Helen Duff:

- Jean (1765-1839), in 1791 married her cousin (Robert's nephew) James Clerk-Rattray of Edinburgh, later Baron of the Exchequer
- A son (b.1766, dsp)
- Robert William (b.1767, grandfather of Robert Duff)
- A child (b. 1775, d. young)
- Adam (1775–1840)
- James Alexander Duff (1777–1800)

Another of Robert Duff's relations, his grandnephew George Duff, achieved distinction in the navy. He was part of Horatio Nelson's fleet, and was assigned to command the inshore squadron watching the enemy in Cádiz prior to the Battle of Trafalgar. He commanded the 74-gun HMS Mars during the battle, and was killed during the fighting.

== Notes ==
Political offices
Preceded by Molyneux Shuldham	Commodore Governor of Newfoundland; 1775	Succeeded by John Montagu
Military offices
Preceded by Robert Man	Commander-in-Chief, Mediterranean Fleet; 1778–1780	Succeeded by Vacant
