= Ed Montague =

Ed Montague may refer to:

- Ed Montague (shortstop) (1905–1988), American baseball player
- Ed Montague (umpire) (born 1948), American baseball umpire

== See also ==
- Edward Montague (disambiguation)
