= John Burnett (colonial secretary) =

Australian politician

John Burnett (September 1781 – 10 July 1860) was the first Colonial Secretary of Van Diemen's Land.

Burnett served from March 1826 until 1835. Several scandals and maladministration characterised his tenure. He worked with Lieutenant Governor George Arthur in conducting the Vandemonian wars against the aboriginal population.

== See also ==
- Colonial Secretary of Van Diemen's Land
