= Montague, Texas =

Census-designated place in Texas, US

- Census-designated place (CDP) & Unincorporated Community
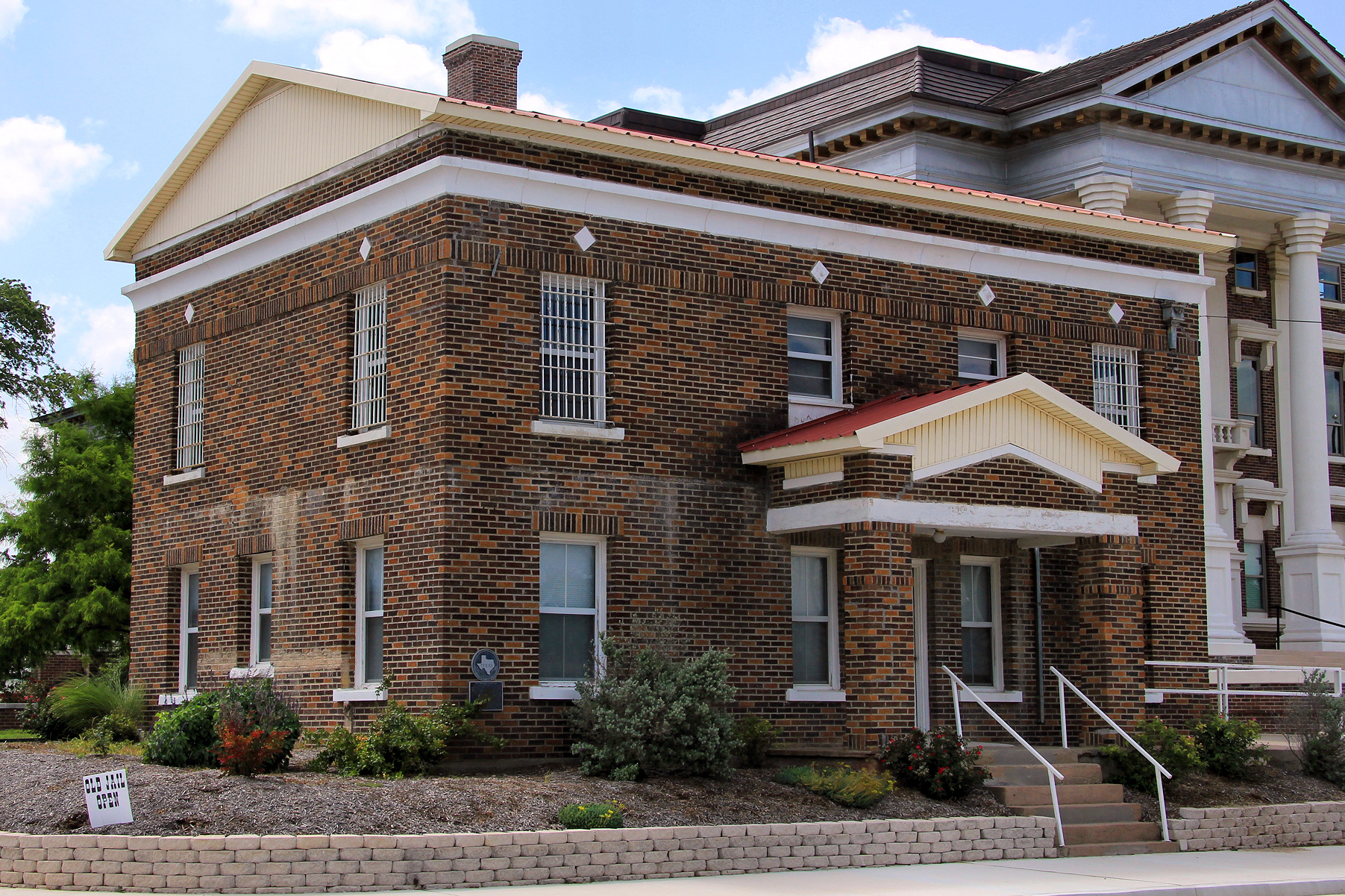
- Old Montague County Jail in Montague

- Location within Texas
- Coordinates: 33°39′55″N 97°43′15″W
- Country: United States
- State: Texas
- County: Montague
- Named for: Daniel Montague

Area
  - Total: 1.276 sq mi (3.30 km^{2})
  - Land: 1.276 sq mi (3.30 km^{2})
  - Water: 0 sq mi (0 km^{2})
- Elevation: 1,070 ft (330 m)

Population (2010)
  - Total: 304
  - Density: 238/sq mi (92.0/km^{2})
- Time zone: UTC-6 (Central (CST))
  - Summer (DST): UTC-5 (CDT)
- ZIP Code: 76251
- Area code: 940
- GNIS feature ID: 2586961

Montague (/ˈmɒnteɪɡ/ MON-tayg) is a census-designated place and unincorporated community in Montague County, Texas, United States. It is the county seat of Montague County, and as of the 2020 census, Montague had a population of 261.

== History ==
Montague was established in 1858 on 160 acres (0.65 km^{2}) of land donated by the state of Texas. The community was named for Daniel Montague, an early surveyor. A post office opened in 1860.

By 1880, an estimated 400 residents lived in the community. They supported five businesses, three churches, a school, and the only flour and grist mills in the county. Montague was incorporated in 1886. That year W.A. Morris and C.C. White tried to raise funds to construct an independent rail line to connect Montague with Bowie, but they were unable to gain a sufficient amount. Bypassed by the railroad, the community suffered isolation and lack of growth. Residents of the town voted to dis-incorporate the community in 1900.

In 1915, an estimated 300 people lived in Montague. That figure reached a low of 284 in 1947. As highways were constructed following World War II, and more people and freight traveled by automobiles and trucks, a modest recovery began. The community began growing again by the 1970s. In 1990 and 2000, around 400 residents lived in the community.

== Geography ==
Montague is located near the intersection of State Highways 59 and 175 in central Montague County.

The community is situated approximately 80 miles (130 km) northwest of Fort Worth, 60 miles (97 km) southeast of Wichita Falls, and 11 miles (18 km) northeast of Bowie.

=== Climate ===
The climate in this area is characterized by hot, humid summers and generally mild to cool winters. According to the Köppen Climate Classification system, Montague has a humid subtropical climate, abbreviated "Cfa" on climate maps.

== Demographics ==
Historical population
Census	Pop.	Note	%±
2010	304		—
2020	261		−14.1%
U.S. Decennial Census; 1850–1900 1910; 1920 1930 1940; 1950 1960 1970; 1980 1990 2000; 2010 2020

Montague first appeared as a census designated place in the 2010 U.S. census.

Montague CDP, Texas – Racial and ethnic composition Note: the US Census treats Hispanic/Latino as an ethnic category. This table excludes Latinos from the racial categories and assigns them to a separate category. Hispanics/Latinos may be of any race.
Race / Ethnicity (NH = Non-Hispanic)	Pop 2010	Pop 2020	% 2010	% 2020
White alone (NH)	275	236	90.46%	90.42%
Black or African American alone (NH)	4	0	1.32%	0.00%
Native American or Alaska Native alone (NH)	0	1	0.00%	0.38%
Asian alone (NH)	0	0	0.00%	0.00%
Native Hawaiian or Pacific Islander alone (NH)	0	0	0.00%	0.00%
Other race alone (NH)	0	1	0.00%	0.38%
Mixed race or Multiracial (NH)	0	5	0.00%	1.92%
Hispanic or Latino (any race)	25	18	8.22%	6.90%
Total	304	261	100.00%	100.00%

As of the 2020 United States census, there were 261 people, 90 households, and 60 families residing in the CDP.

== Education ==
Public education in Montague is provided by the Montague Independent School District, which serves students in grades pre-kindergarten through eighth. Ninth through twelfth graders attend high school in nearby Nocona or Bowie.

== See also ==
- List of Texas county seats
