= Daniel Montague (surveyor) =

American land surveyor and politician (1798–1876)

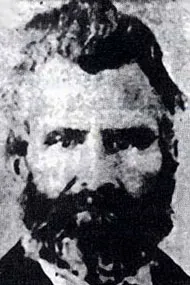
- Born: August 22, 1798; South Hadley, Massachusetts, US
- Died: December 20, 1876 (aged 78); Texas, US
- Occupation(s): Land surveyor, politician, soldier

Daniel Montague (August 22, 1798 – December 20, 1876) was an American land surveyor, politician and soldier.

== Biography ==
Montague was born on August 22, 1798, in South Hadley, Massachusetts, to Seth Montague and Rachel Smith, the third of nine children. He moved to Oklahoma then Louisiana, where he began work as a surveyor and established a plantation.

In 1836, Montague moved to Texas to help Sam Houston in the Battle of San Jacinto, but arrived after the battle concluded. He then returned to Louisiana to settle business affairs before moving back with his family to settle Warren, Texas. In 1843, he commanded the last fight between settlers and Native Americans in Grayson County. He was also a party member of the Jacob Snively expedition.

Montague was elected surveyor of the Fannin Land District in 1854. He was also elected Cooke county commissioner in 1858 and 1862.

During the Mexican–American War, Montague served in the 3rd Texas Cavalry Regiment, under the command of William C. Young. He moved to Cooke County by 1849. He was one of twelve men selected in the jury in the trial for the Great Hanging at Gainesville.

After the American Civil War, Montague moved into a valley on the Tuxpan River. He died on December 20, 1876, in Texas. Montague County and the community in the county with the same name were named in his honor.
