= James Clerk-Rattray =

- Baron Clerk-Rattray, 24th Laird of Rattray
- Born: John Clerk; Edinburgh, Edinburghshire, Scotland
- Died: 105, Princes Street, Edinburgh
- Spouse: Jean Duff
- Issue: Jane Clerk-Rattray; Robert Clerk-Rattray
- Father: Dr David Clerk
- Mother: Helen Duff of Craigston
- Occupation: Lawyer and Advocate

The Hon James Clerk-Rattray FRSE FSAScot (3 December 1763–29 August 1831) was an 18th/19th century Scottish landowner and lawyer who rose to be Baron of the Exchequer.

== Life ==
He was born John Clerk on 3 December 1763 in the South Side of Edinburgh on 3 December 1763 the son of Helen Duff, of Craigston in Aberdeenshire (about 7 miles (11 km) west of Aberdeen, just north-northeast of Westhill), and her husband, Dr David Clerk. His mother was a sister of Admiral Robert Duff. His father was a physician at the Edinburgh Royal Infirmary. The Clerk family were long-standing landowners in the south of Edinburgh and give their name to Clerk Street.

He was educated at the High School in Edinburgh then studied law at the University of Edinburgh. He passed the Scottish Bar as an advocate in 1785. In 1793 he became Sheriff Depute of Edinburghshire. In 1809 he became a Baron of the Exchequer.

When he inherited the estate of Craighall Rattray he changed the family name to Clerk-Rattray and became the 24th Laird of Rattray.

In 1817 he was elected a Fellow of the Royal Society of Edinburgh. His proposers were William Miller, Lord Glenlee, Thomas Charles Hope, and James Russell.

His Edinburgh residence in late life was 105 Princes Street, facing onto Edinburgh Castle.

He died on 29 August 1831.

== Family ==
In 1791 he married his cousin, Jane (Jean) Duff, only daughter of Admiral Duff of Fetteresso.
