= Peter Gordon Fraser =

Scottish public servant (1808–1888)

Colonial Secretary of Van Diemen's Land

Personal details
- Born: March 21, 1808 Scotland
- Died: 1888 (aged 79–80) Weston-super-Mare, England
- Occupation: Public servant; politician; artist

Peter Gordon Fraser (1808-1888) was a Scottish public servant and later a politician and artist in Van Diemen's Land.

Fraser was born on 21 March 1808, the fourth child of Donald and Jane Fraser. Fraser commenced work at the Colonial Office in 1835.

Fraser was at one point the "Colonial Secretary in Van Diemen's Land", a position that later became the Premier of Tasmania.

He died in 1888 in Weston-super-Mare.
