= Henry Montague =

American politician (1813–1909)

Member of the Michigan House of Representatives from the Kalamazoo County 2nd district
- In office January 1, 1855 – December 31, 1856
- Preceded by: Epaphroditus Ransom
- Succeeded by: James Kipp

Personal details
- Born: July 30, 1813 Hadley, Massachusetts, US
- Died: 1909 (aged 95–96)
- Party: Republican

Henry Montague (July 30, 1813 – 1909) was a Michigan politician.

== Early life ==
Montague was born on July 30, 1813, in Hadley, Massachusetts. Montague moved to Michigan in 1835.

== Career ==
Montague was a farmer. On November 8, 1854, Montague was elected to the Michigan House of Representatives where he represented the Kalamazoo County 2nd district from January 3, 1855, to December 31, 1856. Montague was a Republican, but it is unclear if he carried this party affiliation during his time in the legislature or only afterwards. Montague served as a trustee to an asylum in Michigan from 1857 to 1859. In 1859, Montague was appointed to the position of asylum steward which he served as until October 1, 1885.

== Death ==
Montague died in 1909.

== See also ==
- Henry Montague House
