= Charles Montagu =

Charles Montagu may refer to:

- Charles Montagu (of Boughton) (1564–1625), English MP for Higham Ferrers
- Charles Montagu, 1st Earl of Halifax (1661–1715), English poet and statesman
- Charles Montagu, 1st Duke of Manchester (c.1656–1722)
- Charles Montagu (died 1721) (c.1658–1721), English coal owner and member of parliament for Durham
- Charles Montagu (of Papplewick) (died 1759), member of parliament for Westminster, St. Germans, Camelford, Northampton and St. Albans
- Sir Charles Montagu (British Army officer) (died 1777), British general
- Lord Charles Montagu (1741–1784), Royal Governor of the Province of South Carolina
- Charles Montagu, 5th Baron Swaythling (born 1954)

== See also ==
- Charles Montagu-Scott, 4th Duke of Buccleuch (1772–1819)
- Charles Montague (disambiguation)
