= 45th Rattray's Sikhs =

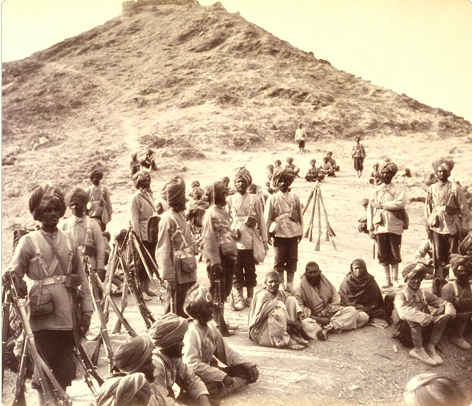
- Active: 1856–1922
- Country: Indian Empire
- Branch: Army
- Type: Infantry
- Part of: Bengal Army (to 1895); Bengal Command
- Nickname: Rattray's Sikhs
- Colors: 1859 Drab; faced blue 1870 Red; faced light buff 1886 white
- Engagements: 1857–1859 Indian Mutiny; Defence of Arrah; 1858 Afghanistan; 1878 Ali Masjid; Punjab Frontier; Malakand

The 45th Rattray's Sikhs was an infantry regiment of the British Indian Army. They could trace their origins to the 1st Bengal Military Police Battalion raised in April 1856, at Lahore, by Captain Thomas Rattray originally consisting of a troop of 100 cavalry and 500 infantry. The initial class composition of the troops was 50% Sikhs and 50% Dogras, Rajputs and Mussulmans (Muslims) from the Punjab and the North-West Frontier. It is said that he went through the villages challenging men to wrestle with him on the condition that they had to join up. Whatever the case, the regiment was raised and trained and developed as an elite corps, which soon saw action in Bihar (then part of Eastern Bengal) in the Sonthal 'parganas'. After sterling service in Bihar, Bengal and Assam, and during the 1857 Mutiny, the cavalry portion was eventually disbanded in 1864 and the infantry section was taken into the line of Bengal Native Infantry as the '45th (Rattray's Sikh) Native Regiment of Infantry'.

After World War I the Indian government reformed the army moving from single battalion regiments to multi battalion regiments. In 1922, the 45th Rattray's Sikhs became the 3rd Battalion, 11th Sikh Regiment. The regiment was allocated to the new India on independence and is now the 3rd Battalion, the Sikh Regiment, with its headquarters at Ramgarh, Jharkhand (formerly part of Bihar state), India.

== Defence of Arrah ==
The battle honour Defence of Arrah was awarded to the Bengal Military Police Battalion for their conduct during the Siege of Arrah, when a party of 68 men (including 50 from this unit) held out for 7 days against an estimated 2000–3000 mutinying sepoys and rebellious citizens, suffering only one casualty.

== North West Frontier Province ==
The regiment was posted to the North West Frontier Province several times. In 1897, it saw action in Malakand (Landikai), Bajour in Mamund and the Bara valley in Tirah. In 1901, it saw action in Waziristan and in 1908 in Zakka Khel.

== World War I ==
During World War I, the regiment was deployed to Mesopotamia/Iraq for periods of 1916-1921.

Subedar Labh Singh was wounded and awarded the Military Cross on 26th May, 1919. Nineteen soldiers in the regiment were awarded the Indian Order of Merit over the course of the campaign.

== Victoria Cross ==
On 27 September 1858 a party of Cavalry commanded by Lieutenant Charles George Baker (Commandant of Cavalry for the Bengal Military Police Battalion), consisting of 69 men from the Bengal Military Police Battalion and 56 men from the 3rd Sikh Irregular Cavalry defeated a force of around 1000 mutinying Bengal Native Infantry soldiers. Only one man from Lt. Baker's force was killed during this operation. For this action, Lieutenant Baker received the Victoria Cross.

== Predecessor names ==
- 1856–58: Bengal Military Police Battalion
- 1858–63: 1st Bengal Military Police Battalion
- 1864: 45th (Rattray's Sikh) Regiment, Bengal Native Infantry
- 1885: 45th (Rattray's Sikh) Regiment, Bengal Infantry
- 1901: 45th (Rattray's) Sikh Infantry
- 1903: 45th Rattray's Sikhs

== Alternative Names ==
During the 1857–59 Indian Mutiny the Bengal Military Police Battalion appears in official paperwork with the following names:

- 1st Bengal Police Battalion
- 1st Bengal Police Battalion. (Seikhs.)
- 1st Bengal Seikh Police Battalion
- Bengal Police Battalion
- Bengal Police Corps
- Bengal Police Seikh Battalion
- Rattray's Seikhs
- Seikh Police Battalion
- Seikh Police Corps

== See also ==
- Clan Rattray
- Clan Rattray website
- Muhammad Habib Khan Tarin
