= Frederick Montagu =

Frederick Montagu may refer to:

- Frederick Montagu (MP, born 1733) (1733–1800), British member of parliament (MP) for Northampton, and for Higham Ferrers
- Lord Frederick Montagu (1774–1827), British politician, Postmaster General and MP for Huntingdonshire

== See also ==
- Fred Montague (1864–1919), English film actor
- Fred Montague, 1st Baron Amwell (Frederick Montague, 1876–1966), British politician, MP for Islington West
