= La Bonneterie Cevenole =

La Bonneterie Cevenole is a French clothing company in Ardèche region in southern France.

Founded in 1925, the company is famous for their Montagu brand shirts. These shirts are made of artificial fibre (polyamide) and are guaranteed to last. The company also makes a line of bedroom linens. The company specializes in producing outerwear garments through knitting processes, using yarn as a primary material.

These shirts have the strongest market in Asia, particularly China and Hong Kong.
