= Henry Montague House =

Historic house in Michigan, United States

- U.S. National Register of Historic Places
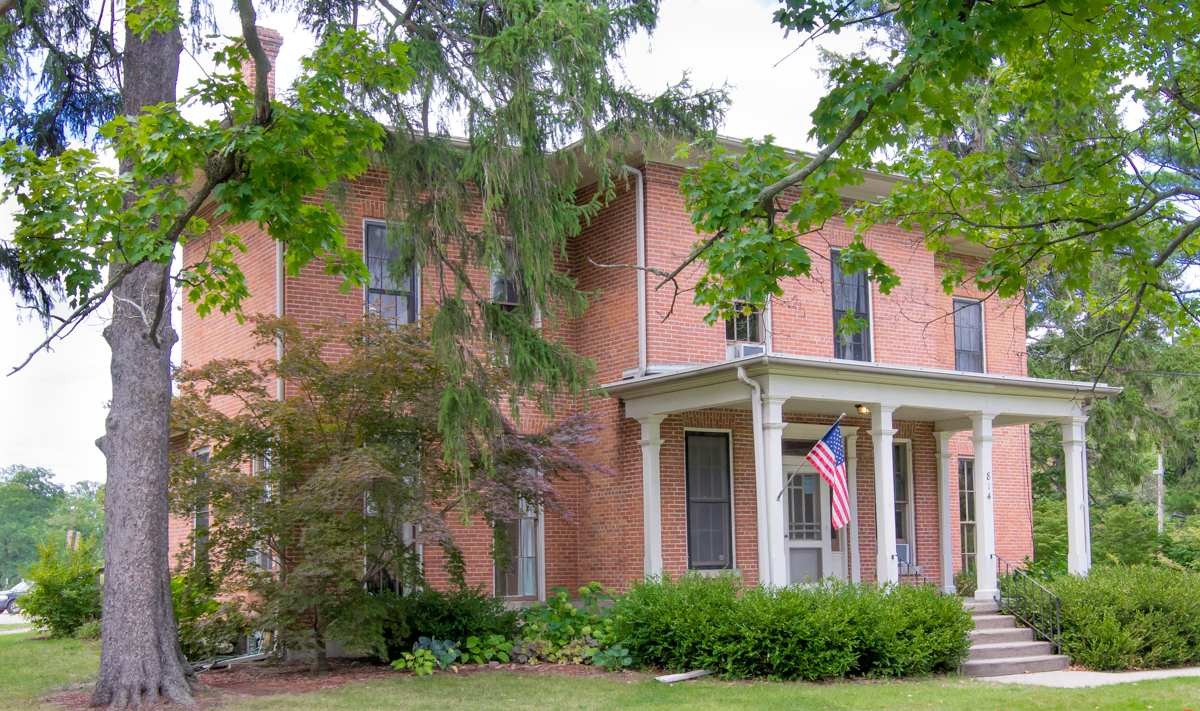

- Location within Michigan Location within the United States
- Interactive map
- Location: 814 Oakland Dr., Kalamazoo, Michigan
- Coordinates: 42°17′01″N 85°35′56″W
- Area: less than one acre
- Built: 1861
- Architectural style: Greek Revival, Italianate
- MPS: Kalamazoo MRA
- NRHP reference No.: 83000864
- Added to NRHP: May 27, 1983

The Henry Montague House in Kalamazoo, Michigan was built in 1861. It includes Greek Revival and Italianate stylings. It was listed on the National Register of Historic Places in 1983.

== History ==
Henry Montague arrived in Kalamazoo in the 1830s from Massachusetts, and was closely involved with the abolitionist movement. He was elected to the state House of Representatives in 1854, and advocated that the state Insane Asylum be located in Kalamazoo. He was ultimately successful, and when the Kalamazoo Psychiatric Hospital opened in 1859, Montague served as its first steward, a post he held until 1884. In 1861, Montague built this "simple but spacious brick home" on land he had purchased adjacent to the Asylum. During his time here, Montague entertained friends in the abolitionist movement, including Sojourner Truth. Montague lived in the house until his death In 1909. After that time, the house served as the residence of various state hospital officials.

== Description ==
The Montague House is a two-story brick structure with a broad, symmetrical facade, including a projecting, veranda-fronted central section. It has square-head windows and a simply detailed transom-and-sidelight entrance, giving the house a Greek Revival look. However, the broadly projecting eaves of the house and hip roof show an Italianate influence. The house serves as the office for Western Michigan University's Association of American University Professors.
