= Montague Independent School District =

School district in Texas, United States

Coordinates: 33.6662°N 97.7206°W

Location
- Montague, Texas; United States

District information
- Type: Public

Other information
- Website: www.montagueisd.org

Montague Independent School District is a public school district based in Montague, Texas (USA). Montague ISD operates one school for grades K-8.

In 2009, the school district was rated "recognized" by the Texas Education Agency.

The district changed to a four-day school week in fall 2022.

== See also ==
- Non-high school district
