= James Montagu (Royal Navy officer) =

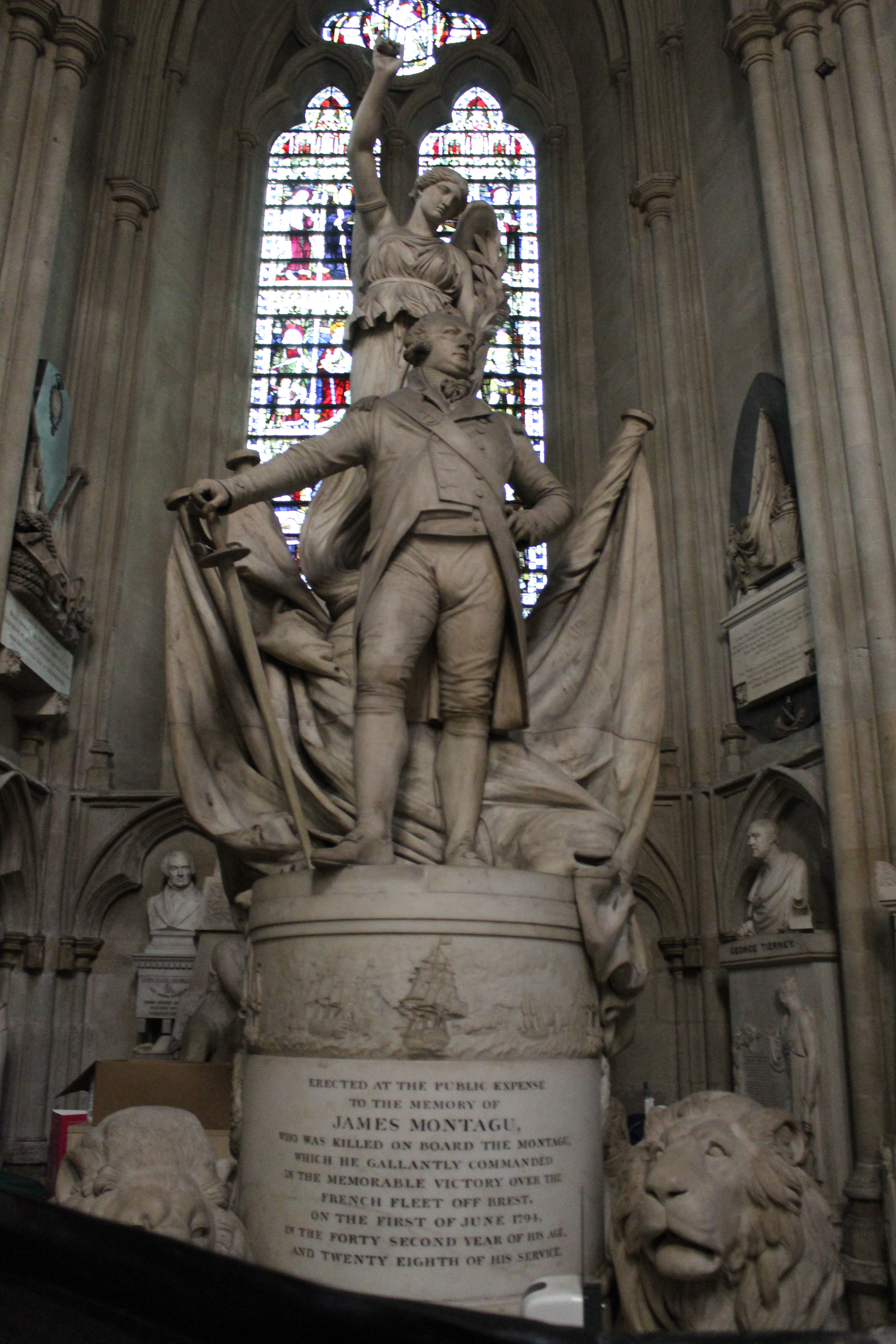
Monument to Montagu in Westminster Abbey

Captain James Montagu (12 August 1752 – 1 June 1794) was a Royal Navy officer who served in the American War of Independence and War of the First Coalition.

== Life ==
Montagu was the third son of Admiral John Montagu, and brother of Admiral George Montagu and of Edward Montagu (1755–1799).

On 18 August 1771 Montagu was promoted by his father to the rank of lieutenant, and on 11 September 1773 to be commander of the sloop HMS Tamar. In her, and afterwards in HMS Kingfisher, he continued on the North American station, and on 14 November 1775 he was posted to HMS Mercury. In December 1776 he was sent to England with the despatches announcing the capture of Rhode Island by Sir Peter Parker and General Clinton.

He then returned to North America; but on 24 December 1777, coming down the North (or Hudson's) River, Mercury struck on a hulk which the enemy had sunk in the fairway, and became a total wreck. Montagu was tried by court-martial at New York, but acquitted of all blame, and in July 1778 he was appointed to the frigate HMS Medea, which for the next two years he commanded on the home station, cruising in the North Sea, in the Channel, or occasionally as far south as Lisbon.

In October 1780 he was moved into the frigate HMS Juno, and, after a year of similar service in the Channel, in February 1782 sailed with Sir Richard Bickerton for the East Indies. Juno arrived at Bombay in August 1782, and on 20 June 1783 was present at the action off Cuddalore, the last between Sir Edward Hughes and the Bailli de Suffren.

Montagu returned to England in the beginning of 1785, and being then unable to obtain employment afloat he went, in October 1786, to France on a twelve-months' leave. In October 1787 he was back in England, but had no employment till the outbreak of the revolutionary war, when at his own special request—apparently on account of the name—he was appointed to the 74-gun third-rate HMS Montagu, one of the grand fleet under Lord Howe during the campaigns of 1793 and 1794.

In the battle off Ushant, on 1 June 1794, Montagu was killed.

== Commemoration ==
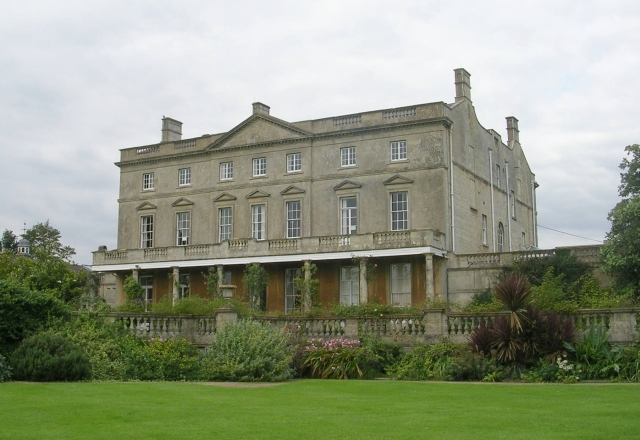
Rear of Lackham House

A monumental statue of Montagu, by John Flaxman, was erected in Westminster Abbey in 1804. The monument is the basis of a vignette at the beginning of Unconditional Surrender (1961) by Evelyn Waugh.

== Lackham House ==
The Montagu family seat was at Lackham, in the north of Lacock parish, Wiltshire. James arranged for the demolition of the medieval house there and its replacement by a three-storey country house in Palladian style, which was completed in 1796, after his death. Since 1946, the house and grounds have housed an agricultural college which is now part of Wiltshire College.
