= George Montagu (Royal Navy officer) =

Royal Navy Admiral (1750–1829)

Admiral Sir George Montagu
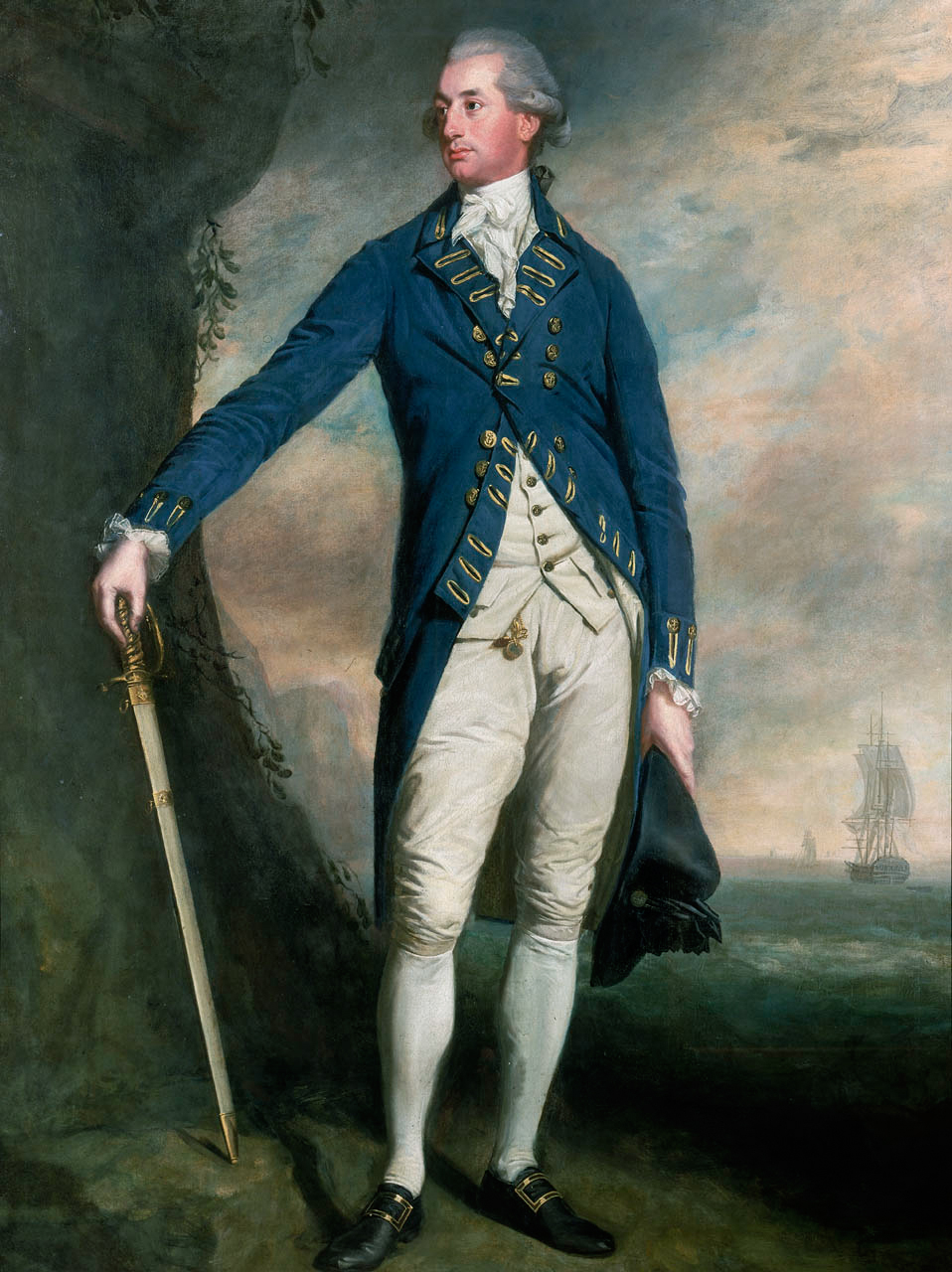
- Portrait by Thomas Beach, c. 1780–1790
- Born: 12 December 1750
- Died: 24 December 1829 (aged 79)
- Relatives: John Montagu; James Montagu; Edward Montagu
- Military career
- Allegiance: Kingdom of Great Britain; Great Britain and Ireland
- Branch: Royal Navy
- Service years: 1763–1815
- Rank: Admiral of the Red
- Commands: Portsmouth Command
- Conflicts: American Revolutionary War; French Revolutionary Wars; Napoleonic Wars

Admiral Sir George Montagu (12 December 1750 – 24 December 1829) was a Royal Navy officer, the second son of Admiral John Montagu, and the brother of Captain James Montagu and Lieutenant-Colonel Edward Montagu.

== Early career ==
In 1763 Montagu entered the Royal Academy at Portsmouth, and was then appointed to HMS Preston with Captain Alan Gardner (afterwards Admiral Lord Gardner), going out to the Jamaica station with the flag of Rear Admiral William Parry. He served in Preston for three years, before following Captain Gardner to HMS Levant. He finally returned to England in 1770.

He passed his lieutenant's examination on 2 October 1770, and on 14 January 1771 was appointed lieutenant of HMS Marlborough. In February he was moved into HMS Captain, going out to North America as the flagship of his father. On 9 April 1773 he was appointed commander in the 18 gun sloop HMS Kingfisher, and on 15 April 1774 (Pay-book of the Fowey) he was posted to HMS Fowey. In her he continued on the North American station during the early years of the war of independence, actively co-operating with the army in the embarkation at Boston in March, and in the reduction of New York City in October 1776.

Shortly after he returned to England in bad health. From 1777 to 1779 he commanded HMS Romney, as flag captain to his father at Newfoundland. On his return he was appointed to the 32-gun frigate HMS Pearl, which when cruising near the Azores on 14 September 1779, captured the Spanish frigate Santa Monica of equal force. In December Pearl sailed with the fleet under Sir George Rodney, and assisted in the capture of the Caracas convoy; but having sprung her foremast, was ordered home with the prizes. She was afterwards sent out to North America, and on 30 September 1780, while on a cruise off the Bermudas, captured the Espérance, a frigate-built privateer of 32 guns. In the battle of Cape Henry, on 16 March 1781, she acted as repeating frigate. She was not with the fleet during the battle of the Chesapeake on 5 September, but joined it, still off Cape Henry, on the 14th, and was left to keep watch on the movements of the French till the 25th, when she sailed for New York. On 19 October she sailed again with the fleet, and on the 23rd was stationed ahead as a look-out (Pearl's Log). She returned to England in 1782.

During the Spanish Armament of 1790 Montagu was appointed to HMS Hector (74) and went out to the Leeward Islands in 1793 with Rear Admiral Gardner, and thence to Jamaica, to convoy the homeward-bound trade. He was afterwards with the squadron in the Downs, under the orders of Rear Admiral MacBride, until 12 April 1794, when he was promoted to the rank of rear admiral, and, hoisting his flag in the Hector, joined the grand fleet under Lord Howe.

== The Glorious First of June ==
On 4 May he was detached, with a squadron of six ships of the line, to convoy a large fleet of merchant ships as far as Cape Finisterre. His further orders were to cruise to the westward till 20 May, in the hope of meeting the French provision convoy daily expected from America. The convoy, however, did not arrive at that time, and Montagu, after making several important captures, returned to Plymouth on 30 May. He had extended his cruise for several days beyond the prescribed limit, but had not been able to communicate with Howe. On 2 June he received orders from the Admiralty to put to sea again with every available ship, and to cruise off Brest in order to intercept the French provision fleet. On the 3rd the Audacious came in with news of the partial action of 28 May; but Montagu, having no other orders, put to sea on 4 June with nine ships of the line. On the evening of the 8th he chased a French squadron of eight ships into Brest, and at daybreak on the 9th found a French fleet of nineteen ships of the line a few miles to the westward of him. Though several of these were under jurymasts, or in tow of others, they all appeared capable of defending themselves, and fourteen of them seemed to be ordinarily effective. Of Howe's success Montagu had no information. All he could hope was that by stretching to the southward, with a northerly wind, he might tempt the French so far to leeward of their port that Howe, if following them up, might be able to secure them. The French commander, Villaret, however, was not inclined to run such a risk, and, after a slight demonstration of chasing him, resumed his course and steered for Brest, while Montagu, after looking for Howe to the north-west, and failing to find him, bore away for the Channel, and on the 12th anchored in Cawsand Bay.

In 1823 Captain Brenton, in relating these events in the first volume of his Naval History, pp. 296–300, attacked Montagu's conduct in not bringing on a general action, and said that "Lord Chatham and the board of admiralty expressed some displeasure at the conduct of the rear-admiral, and he was ordered or permitted to strike his flag." Montagu published A Refutation of the Incorrect Statements and Unjust Insinuations contained in Captain Brenton's "Naval History of Great Britain," as far as the same refers to the Conduct of Admiral Sir George Montagu; in a Letter addressed to the Author. Montagu was perhaps too old, too angry, and too little practised in literary fencing to punish Brenton as he deserved; but he had no difficulty in showing that Brenton's facts were untrue.

Howe and the Admiralty fully approved of Montagu's conduct; and when, in bad health, rendered worse by the shock of his brother's death during the battle, he applied for permission to resign his command, they both expressed their regret and a hope that his absence might be short.

On 1 June 1795 he was promoted to vice admiral, and in March 1799 he was offered the command at the Nore, which he declined, as beneath his rank. In April 1800 Lord St. Vincent offered him the post of second in command in the Channel; but other officers were appointed by the admiralty, and there was no vacancy (Addit. MS. 31158, ff. 113, 117). On 1 January 1801 he was made admiral; but when shortly afterwards he applied for a command, St. Vincent, who had become first lord of the admiralty, replied that he had learned there was "an insuperable bar" to his "being employed in any way". He refused to say what the bar was; but it would appear to have been some misunderstanding of his conduct in 1794, as it gave way on a perusal of the official letters which Montagu had received at the time, and in 1803 he was appointed Commander-in-Chief, Portsmouth. He held this post for five and a half years, and in August 1810 was presented with "a superb piece of plate" as "a tribute of respect and esteem" by the captains who had fitted out at Portsmouth during his command. On 2 January 1815, he was nominated a G.C.B., but had no service after the peace. He died on 24 December 1829.

== Family ==
In 1783 Montagu married his first cousin, Charlotte, the daughter and co-heiress of George Wroughton of Wilcot, Wiltshire, and had a daughter and four sons. The eldest son, George, adopted the name of Wroughton in 1826, and died a lieutenant-colonel in the army in 1871. The second, John William, died an admiral on the retired list in 1882; the third, James, was also a retired admiral at his death in 1868; the fourth, Edward (died 1820), was in holy orders.

His daughter, Georgiana (died 1854), married Admiral Sir John Gore.

Military offices
Preceded by Lord Gardner	Commander-in-Chief, Portsmouth; 1803–1809	Succeeded by Sir Roger Curtis
