= Edward Montagu (Indian Army officer) =

Edward Montagu (1755–1799), Indian officer, was youngest son of Admiral John Montagu, and brother to Admiral Sir George Montagu and Captain James Montagu.

Educated at the Royal Academy of Woolwich, he went out to Bengal as an East India cadet in 1770. There being no commission vacant on his arrival, he was first placed in the ‘select picket,’ a military body composed of the cadets then present at Calcutta.

On 16 May 1772 he was admitted into the Bengal Artillery as lieutenant-fireworker, and by 24 Sept. 1777 he had risen to the rank of first-lieutenant of artillery. He was attached to Brigadier-general Thomas Goddard's army during the Mahratta campaign of 1781, and was successfully employed against certain Mahratta forts on the Rohilcund border, on one occasion being severely wounded in the face by an arrow.

In 1782 he accompanied Colonel Pearce's detachment, sent to join Sir Eyre Coote (1726–1783), then engaged against Haider Ali and his French allies in the Carnatic, and in 1783 he commanded the English artillery in the siege unsuccessfully attempted by General James Stuart of Cuddalore, a strong Carnatic fortress then held by the French. On the conclusion of the war in the Carnatic (1784), Montagu returned to Bengal. He was promoted to a captaincy on 13 Oct. 1784. He took a prominent part in the invasion of Mysore, conducted by Lord Cornwallis in 1791. He superintended the artillery employed in the sieges of Nandidrúg (captured 19 Oct. 1791) and Savandrúg (captured 21 Dec. 1791). For his skill and vigour Montagu received special commendation from Lord Cornwallis. The war concluded in favour of the English in 1792. On 1 March 1794 Montagu was made lieutenant-colonel, being now third on the list of Bengal artillery officers.

In the final war against Tipu, sultan of Mysore (1799), Montagu, as commander of the Bengal artillery, accompanied the army under General Harris which was directed to invade Mysore from Madras. On 9 April 1799 Seringapatam, the Mysore capital, was formally invested. On 2 May Montagu, while directing his battery, was struck in the shoulder by a cannon-shot from the enemy's lines. He died from the effects of the wound on 8 May 1799.
