= John Montagu (Royal Navy officer) =

Royal Navy officer, politician and colonial administrator (1719–1795)

Admiral John Montagu
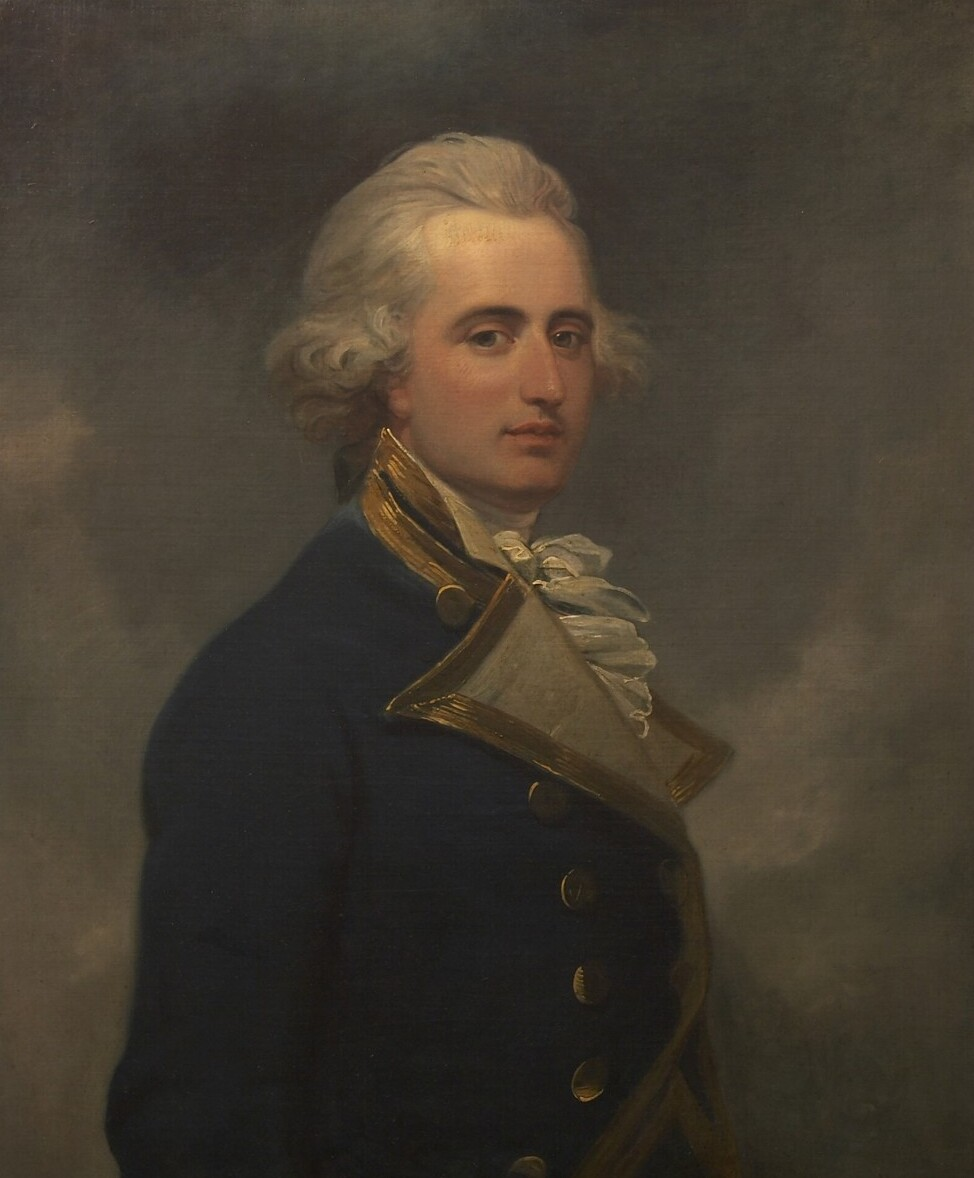
- Portrait by Richard Cosway

Member of the Great Britain Parliament for Huntingdon
- In office 1748–1754 Serving with Edward Montagu
- Preceded by: Edward Montagu; Kelland Courtenay
- Succeeded by: Edward Montagu; Robert Jones

Governor of Newfoundland
- In office 1776–1778
- Preceded by: Robert Duff
- Succeeded by: Richard Edwards
- Military career
- Born: 1719; Lackham, Wiltshire
- Died: 7 September 1795 (aged 75–76); Fareham, Hampshire
- Alma mater: Royal Naval Academy
- Children: 5, including George, James, and Edward
- Allegiance: Great Britain
- Branch: Royal Navy
- Service years: 1733–1795
- Rank: Admiral
- Commands: HMS Hinchinbrook; HMS Rose; HMS Ambuscade; HMS Tilbury; HMS Greenwich; HMS Bristol; HMS Kent; HMS Mermaid; HMS Elizabeth; HMS Monarch; HMS Raisonnable; HMS Panther; HMS Terrible; HMS Newark; HMS Princess Amelia; HMS Magnanime; HMS Dragon; HMS Bellona; Downs Station; North American Station; Newfoundland Station; Portsmouth Command
- Conflicts: War of the Austrian Succession; Battle of Toulon; First Battle of Cape Finisterre; Seven Years' War; Battle of Cartagena; Capture of Belle Île; American Revolutionary War

Viceregal styles of John Montagu
- Reference style: His Excellency
- Spoken style: Your Excellency

Admiral John Montagu (1719 – 7 September 1795) was a Royal Navy officer, politician and colonial administrator who served as the governor of Newfoundland.

== Naval career ==
He was born in 1719, son of James Montagu of Lackham, Lacock, Wiltshire (died 1747), and great-grandson of James Montagu of Lackham (1602–1665), third son of Henry Montagu, 1st Earl of Manchester. Montagu began his naval career in the Royal Naval Academy, Portsmouth on 14 August 1733.

He was promoted Lieutenant in 1740 and served on HMS Buckingham and, in 1744, was present at the Battle of Toulon. In 1757 he was present at the execution of Admiral John Byng. Promoted to Rear-Admiral 1 November 1770, he served as Commander-in-Chief of the North American Station from 1771 to 1774, reporting his arriving at Boston on HMS Captain, 13 August 1771 along with HMS Lively, HMS Tamar and HMS Swan.

In June 1772, Montagu was involved in the Gaspee Affair as the commanding officer of Lieutenant William Duddingston, where he unsuccessfully tried to identify and have prosecuted the men who attacked Dudingston's ship, HMS Gaspee.

The Admiralty informed Montagu 4 September 1773 that as C-in-C he and Lieutenants commanding armed vessels were not able to preside at any Court Martials.

Returning to England on board HMS Captain, Montagu arrived at Spithead 1 August 1774.

He acknowledged his promotion to Rear Admiral of the Red by letter from Widley 4 April 1775. The Admiralty informed Montagu was made Vice-Admiral of Blue 6 February 1776 and a week later he was in London to take up his commission. He was then appointed Governor and Commander-in-Chief of Newfoundland. Montagu captured St. Pierre and Miquelon for the British and defended Newfoundland from both French and American privateers. By his swift actions he had prevented the French from capturing Carbonear and Harbour Grace.

In 1783 he was made Commander-in-Chief, Portsmouth. He was promoted to Admiral of the Blue in 1782 and Admiral of the White in 1787.

== Family ==
Montagu married Sophia Wroughton on 2 December 1748 and had one daughter and four sons. Of his sons, George and James became naval officers, while Edward became a lieutenant-colonel in the Royal Artillery. His daughter Sophia lived at Dale Park and the house there was constructed for her and her husband.

== See also ==
- Governors of Newfoundland
- List of people of Newfoundland and Labrador

Parliament of Great Britain
Preceded by Edward Montagu; Kelland Courtenay	Member of Parliament for Huntingdon; 1748–1754; With: Edward Montagu	Succeeded by Edward Montagu; Robert Jones
Military offices
Preceded by James Gambier	Commander-in-Chief, North American Station; 1771–1774	Succeeded by Samuel Graves
Political offices
Preceded by Robert Duff	Commodore Governor of Newfoundland; 1776–1778	Succeeded by Richard Edwards
Military offices
Preceded by Thomas Pye	Commander-in-Chief, Portsmouth; 1783–1786	Succeeded by Viscount Hood
