= List of Farm to Market Roads in Texas (2100–2199) =

- Texas Farm to Market Road and Ranch to Market Road markers

Highway names
- Interstates: Interstate Highway X (IH-X, I-X)
- US Highways: U.S. Highway X (US X)
- State: State Highway X (SH X)
- Loops: Loop X
- Spurs: Spur X
- Recreational: Recreational Road X (RE X)
- Farm or Ranch to Market Roads: Farm to Market Road X (FM X); Ranch to Market Road X (RM X)
- Park Roads: Park Road X (PR X)

System links
- Highways in Texas; Interstate; US; State; Former; Toll; Loops; Spurs; FM/RM; Park; Rec

Farm to Market Roads in Texas are owned and maintained by the Texas Department of Transportation (TxDOT).

== FM 2100 ==
Farm to Market Road 2100
- Location: Harris County
- Length: 14.201 mi (22.854 km)
- Existed: 1953–present

Farm to Market Road 2100 (FM 2100) is located in Harris County. The 14-mile-long (23 km) route has its southern terminus in Barrett at a junction with US 90 (Crosby Freeway), which also serves as the eastern terminus of Bus. US 90 and the western terminus of FM 1942. FM 2100 runs northward via Crosby to an intersection FM 1960 in Huffman. It continues northward, paralleling the eastern shore of Lake Houston, before state maintenance and the FM 2100 designation end. The roadway continues under county maintenance as Huffman-Cleveland Road, which becomes FM 1485 about 4 miles (6.4 km) to the north.

FM 2100 was designated on October 28, 1953, from US 90 via Crosby to a point 6.2 miles (10.0 km) north. On September 29, 1954, the designation was extended north 4.0 miles (6.4 km) to FM 1008 (now FM 1960) at Huffman, and it was extended north an additional 2.5 miles (4.0 km) to Wolf Road on July 11, 1968. On September 29, 1977, it was extended northwest 2.1 miles (3.4 km). On June 27, 1995, the section from FM 1960 to US 90 was transferred to Urban Road 2100 (UR 2100). The designation of this segment reverted to FM 2100 with the elimination of the Urban Road system on November 15, 2018. On August 28, 2003, the designation was extended north to FM 1485, pending improvements to Huffman-Cleveland Road; however, as of 2023, this portion is not part of the state highway system.

The southern segment, between US 90 and FM 1960, has long been considered one of the most dangerous roadways in the area. Construction began in 2019 to expand FM 2100 from South Diamondhead Boulevard in Crosby to FM 1960 from a two-lane undivided roadway to a four-lane divided one. Originally scheduled for completion in January 2021, the project was finished in March 2023.

In 2016, TxDOT proposed widening FM 2100 from two lanes to four from the intersection with FM 1960 to the northern terminus. The project was unfunded as of August 2018.

In February 2023, TxDOT completed its environmental assessment regarding the northern extension of FM 2100, which is proposed to run from the current northern terminus via Huffman-Cleveland Road before turning to the northeast along a new right of way to an interchange with SH 99 (Grand Parkway) at Plum Grove Road, east of the toll road's junction with FM 1485.

== FM 2101 ==
Farm to Market Road 2101
- Location: Hunt County
- Length: 14.246 mi (22.927 km)
- Existed: 1953–present

Farm to Market Road 2101 (FM 2101) is located in Hunt County.

The southern terminus of FM 2101 is at SH 34 northeast of Quinlan. From this location, the roadway travels to the east and briefly dips southward toward Lake Tawakoni before turning northward, roughly paralleling SH 34 for its entire length. The route enters the city of Greenville and ends at FM 1570 at the western edge of Majors Airport.

The southern section of FM 2101 was designated on October 28, 1953, and ran approximately 4.0 miles (6.4 km) from SH 34 along the northern shore of Lake Tawakoni. The route was extended northward, first to FM 1564 on September 27, 1960, and then to the current northern terminus at FM 1570 on May 7, 1970.

Junction list

The entire route is in Hunt County.

Location	mi	km	Destinations	Notes
	0.0	0.0	SH 34 – Quinlan	Southern terminus
	6.7	10.8	FM 2947 – Lone Oak	
	9.3	15.0	FM 1564	
Greenville	14.3	23.0	FM 1570 (Jack Finney Blvd.)	Northern terminus
1.000 mi = 1.609 km; 1.000 km = 0.621 mi

== FM 2102 ==
Farm to Market Road 2102
- Location: Karnes County
- Length: 14.478 mi (Note: The certified length given is shorter than the actual mileage, as the TxDOT description of FM 2102 considers it to be discontinuous at rather than concurrent with FM 626.) (23.300 km)
- Existed: September 21, 1955–present

Farm to Market Road 2102 (FM 2102) is located in Karnes County.

FM 2102 begins at an intersection with FM 99 near Fashing. The highway travels in a mostly eastern direction and has a brief overlap with FM 626 west of Kenedy. FM 2102 continues to run in a more eastern direction before ending at an intersection with SH 72 in Kenedy.

The current FM 2102 was designated on September 21, 1955, running from FM 626 near Lenz to SH 72 near Kenedy at a distance of 7.5 miles (12.1 km). The highway was extended 7.0 miles (11.3 km) from FM 626 to FM 99 on May 6, 1964.

=== FM 2102 (1953) ===
Farm to Market Road 2102
- Location: Rains County
- Existed: October 28, 1953–November 29, 1954

FM 2102 was first designated on October 28, 1953, running from US 69 at Emory westward at a distance of 5.8 miles (9.3 km). On October 26, 1954, the highway was extended west 7.4 miles (11.9 km) to the Hunt County line. The highway was cancelled and combined with FM 35 on November 29, 1954.

== FM 2103 ==
Farm to Market Road 2103
- Location: Childress County
- Length: 4.724 mi (7.603 km)
- Existed: October 26, 1953–present

Farm to Market Road 2103 (FM 2103) is located in southern Childress County. The western terminus is at an intersection with CR 5; the roadway west of here is CR 180. FM 2103 travels eastward, with several turns to the north, before ending at an intersection with US 62/US 83; the roadway continues east as CR 178.

FM 2103 was designated on October 26, 1953, running from US 83 westward 1.5 miles (2.4 km) to a road intersection (present-day CR 202). It was extended 3.5 miles (5.6 km) to its current western terminus on November 21, 1956.

== FM 2104 ==
Farm to Market Road 2104
- Location: Bastrop County
- Length: 12.485 mi (20.093 km)
- Existed: 1953–present

Farm to Market Road 2104 (FM 2104) is located in Bastrop County. The highway travels from FM 153 near Smithville to US 290 in Paige.

FM 2104 was designated on October 28, 1953, traveling from US 290 at Paige to a road intersection at a distance of 6.5 miles (10.5 km). The highway was extended 7.5 miles (12.1 km) to FM 153 on November 21, 1956.

Junction list

The entire route is in Bastrop County.

Location	mi	km	Destinations	Notes
	0.0	0.0	FM 153 – Smithville, Winchester	
	6.9	11.1	FM 2239 east – Serbin	
Paige	12.5	20.1	US 290 – Austin, Giddings	
1.000 mi = 1.609 km; 1.000 km = 0.621 mi

== FM 2105 ==
Farm to Market Road 2105
- Location: Tom Green County
- Length: 6.952 mi (11.188 km)
- Existed: October 31, 1957–present

Farm to Market Road 2105 (FM 2105) is located in Tom Green County.

FM 2105 begins at US 87 between Grape Creek and San Angelo. The highway runs east just north of San Angelo and intersects SH 208 before ending at an intersection with US 277.

The current FM 2105 was designated on October 31, 1957, along its current route. Despite running through more rural areas outside of the city, the entirety of the route was redesignated Urban Road 2105 (UR 2105) on June 27, 1995. The designation reverted to FM 2105 with the elimination of the Urban Road system on November 15, 2018.

Junction list

The entire route is in Tom Green County.

Location	mi	km	Destinations	Notes
	0.0	0.0	US 87 – Sterling City, San Angelo	
	3.0	4.8	SH 207 – Robert Lee, San Angelo	
	6.9	11.1	US 277 – Bronte, San Angelo	
1.000 mi = 1.609 km; 1.000 km = 0.621 mi

=== FM 2105 (1953) ===
Farm to Market Road 2105
- Location: Lubbock County
- Existed: October 28, 1953–November 1, 1954

FM 2105 was first designated on October 28, 1953, running from US 87 in Abernathy east to a road intersection at a distance of 6.7 miles (10.8 km). The highway was cancelled on November 1, 1954, with the mileage being transferred to FM 597.

== FM 2106 ==
Farm to Market Road 2106
- Location: Garza County
- Length: 4.904 mi (7.892 km)
- Existed: October 28, 1953–present

Farm to Market Road 2106 (FM 2106) is located in Garza County. It begins at an intersection with CR 180 and runs north to an intersection with US 84 in Southland.

FM 2106 was designated on October 28, 1953, along the current route.

Junction list

The entire route is in Garza County.

Location	mi	km	Destinations	Notes
	0.0	0.0	County Road 180	
	1.0	1.6	FM 211 – Wilson	
Southland	4.9	7.9	US 84 – Lubbock, Post	
1.000 mi = 1.609 km; 1.000 km = 0.621 mi

== FM 2107 ==
Farm to Market Road 2107
- Location: Bandera County
- Length: 8.458 mi (13.612 km)
- Existed: 1953–present

Farm to Market Road 2107 (FM 2107) is located in Bandera County in the Texas Hill Country.

FM 2107 begins at a point on North Prong Creek Road and runs southeast for approximately 8.5 miles (13.7 km) before ending at an intersection with SH 16 northwest of Medina. FM 2107 runs parallel to the North Prong Medina River for its entire length.

FM 2107 was designated on October 28, 1953, running from SH 16 northwest at a distance of 5.0 miles (8.0 km). The highway was extended 3.2 miles (5.1 km) on October 13, 1954.

== FM 2108 ==
Farm to Market Road 2108
- Location: Angelina County
- Length: 3.731 mi (6.004 km)
- Existed: 1953–present

Farm to Market Road 2108 (FM 2108) is located in Angelina County, traveling just south of Lufkin.

FM 2108 begins at an intersection with US 59 north of Burke near the Angelina County Airport. The highway travels through an area that is mixed between rural and suburban. FM 2108 ends at an intersection with FM 58.

FM 2108 was designated on October 28, 1953, along the current route.

Junction list

The entire route is in Angelina County.

Location	mi	km	Destinations	Notes
	0.0	0.0	Future I-69 / US 59 – Lufkin, Diboll	U.S. 59 is the future I-69
	2.9	4.7	FM 819 – Angelina College	
	3.7	6.0	FM 58 – Lufkin	
1.000 mi = 1.609 km; 1.000 km = 0.621 mi

== FM 2109 ==
Farm to Market Road 2109
- Location: Angelina County
- Length: 17.202 mi (27.684 km)
- Existed: 1953–present

Farm to Market Road 2109 (FM 2109) is located in Angelina County.

FM 2109 runs from FM 1669 in Huntington to SH 147 in Zavalla. The highway travels in an eastern direction from FM 1669 to the Sam Rayburn Reservoir near County Road 198. FM 2109 then turns south and runs through the Angelina National Forest and runs closely to the lake.

FM 2109 was designated on October 28, 1953, running from FM 328 in Huntington eastward at a distance of 4.1 miles (6.6 km). The highway was extended 0.1 miles (0.16 km) westward to FM 1669 on March 23, 1954. FM 2109 was extended 4.8 miles (7.7 km) to Ora on November 21, 1956. The highway was extended 3.4 miles (5.5 km) to SH 147 on September 30, 1964, absorbing FM 2662 in the process.

Junction list

The entire route is in Angelina County.

Location	mi	km	Destinations	Notes
Huntington	0.0	0.0	FM 1669	
Huntington	0.1	0.16	FM 328 east	
	10.0	16.1	FM 2801 east – Hooks Creek Park	
	13.9	22.4	FM 3124 east – Monterey Park	
Zavalla	17.2	27.7	SH 147 – San Augustine, Zavalla	
1.000 mi = 1.609 km; 1.000 km = 0.621 mi

== FM 2110 ==
Farm to Market Road 2110
- Location: Houston County
- Length: 8.603 mi (13.845 km)
- Existed: 1953–present

Farm to Market Road 2110 (FM 2110) is located in Houston County.

FM 2110 was designated on October 28, 1953, running from SH 19 in Crockett southwestward at a distance of 6.0 miles (9.7 km). The highway was extended 2.1 miles (3.4 km) southwestward on September 29, 1977.

Junction list

The entire route is in Houston County.

Location	mi	km	Destinations	Notes
	0.0	0.0	Old Huntsville Road	
Crockett	7.8	12.6	Loop 304	
Crockett	8.6	13.8	SH 19 (4th Street) – Palestine, Trinity	
1.000 mi = 1.609 km; 1.000 km = 0.621 mi

== FM 2111 ==
Farm to Market Road 2111
- Location: Runnels County
- Length: 18.437 mi (29.671 km)
- Existed: October 31, 1957–present

Farm to Market Road 2111 (FM 2111) is located in Runnels County.

FM 2111 begins at an intersection with FM 2133. The highway crosses the Colorado River and runs just west of the Ballinger City Lake. FM 2111 intersects SH 158 northwest of Ballinger. The highway travels through more rural areas north of SH 158 and ends at an intersection with SH 153/FM 384 west of Winters.

The current FM 2111 was designated on October 31, 1957, running from FM 53 (now SH 153) and FM 384 southward at a distance of 5.0 miles (8.0 km). The highway was extended 7.2 miles (11.6 km) to SH 158 on October 31, 1958. FM 2111 was extended 6.3 miles (10.1 km) to FM 2133 on May 7, 1970.

=== FM 2111 (1953) ===
Farm to Market Road 2111
- Location: Nacogdoches County
- Existed: October 28, 1953–September 30, 1955

A previous route numbered FM 2111 was designated on October 28, 1953, traveling from SH 21 in Nacogdoches southwestward to Alazan at a distance of 7.8 miles (12.6 km). The highway was extended west 6.6 miles (10.6 km) to FM 225 on August 24, 1955. The highway was cancelled on September 30, 1955, with the mileage being transferred to FM 225.

== FM 2112 ==
Farm to Market Road 2112
- Location: Nacogdoches County
- Length: 4.949 mi (7.965 km)
- Existed: 1953–present

Farm to Market Road 2112 (FM 2112) is located in Nacogdoches County.

FM 2112 begins at an intersection with SH 7 east of Nacogdoches. The highway runs through wooded areas just east of the city and ends at an intersection with FM 1878.

FM 2112 was designated on October 28, 1953, running from SH 7 east of Nacogdoches northward at a distance of 4.8 miles (7.7 km). The highway was extended to FM 1878 on October 13, 1954.

Junction list

The entire route is in Nacogdoches County.

Location	mi	km	Destinations	Notes
	0.0	0.0	SH 7 – Nacogdoches, Center	
	2.0	3.2	FM 2713 east	
	4.9	7.9	FM 1878 – Nacogdoches	
1.000 mi = 1.609 km; 1.000 km = 0.621 mi

== FM 2113 ==
Farm to Market Road 2113
- Location: McLennan County
- Length: 16.097 mi (25.906 km)
- Existed: 1953–present

Farm to Market Road 2113 (FM 2113) is located in McLennan County, running from Moody to Hewitt.

FM 2113 begins at an intersection with FM 107 in Moody and runs northeast through mostly rural farm land. The highway turns in a more eastern direction after an intersection with FM 2416 and passes by a few subdivisions near FM 2837. FM 2113 enters Hewitt and almost immediately has an interchange with FM 1695. The highway runs through suburban areas of Hewitt along Spring Valley Road before ending at a junction with I-35/FM 2063.

FM 2113 was designated on October 28, 1953, running from US 81 5.0 miles (8.0 km) south of Waco to a point 3.5 miles (5.6 km) northwestward of Spring Valley at a distance of 4.6 miles (7.4 km). The highway was extended 4.0 miles (6.4 km) southwestward on October 26, 1954. The road was extended 8.4 miles (13.5 km) to FM 107 at Moody on July 28, 1955. On June 27, 1995, the section of FM 2113 between FM 1695 and I-35 was redesignated Urban Road 2113 (UR 2113). The designation reverted to FM 2113 with the elimination of the Urban Road system on November 15, 2018.

Junction list

The entire route is in McLennan County.

Location	mi	km	Destinations	Notes
Moody	0.0	0.0	FM 107 to SH 317 – Eddy	
Spring Valley	8.0	12.9	FM 2416 west – McGregor	
	11.4	18.3	FM 2837 to US 84 – Lorena	
Hewitt	13.5	21.7	FM 1695 (Hewitt Drive)	Interchange
Hewitt	15.7	25.3	I-35 north	Interchange; northbound exit only
Hewitt	16.1	25.9	I-35 / FM 2063 north (Sun Valley Boulevard)	I-35 exit 328
1.000 mi = 1.609 km; 1.000 km = 0.621 mi: Incomplete access

== FM 2114 ==
Farm to Market Road 2114
- Location: Bosque, Hill, and McLennan counties
- Length: 38.025 mi (Note: The certified length given is shorter than the actual mileage, as the TxDOT description of FM 2114 considers it to be discontinuous at rather than concurrent with FM 308.) (61.195 km)
- Existed: 1953–present

Farm to Market Road 2114 (FM 2114) is located in Central Texas, running from FM 56 southeast of Laguna Park to SH 171 in Hubbard.

FM 2114 begins at an intersection with FM 56 southeast of Laguna Park near Lake Whitney. The highway travels in a mostly eastern direction before turning south near Smiths Bend and turns back to the east after crossing the Brazos River. FM 2114 turns to the northeast at FM 1304 west and the two highways have a brief overlap with FM 2114 turning southeast at FM 1304 east. The highway enters into McLennan County at County Line Road and travels along T.M. West Parkway and enters West near I-35/US 77. FM 2114 travels along Oak Street through the town and turns onto Cottonwood Road at FM 2311. The highway leaves West and travels in a northeast direction to Penelope where it has a brief overlap with FM 308. After leaving Penelope, FM 2114 travels in an eastward direction to Hubbard, where it ends at an intersection with SH 171.

FM 2114 was designated on October 28, 1953, running from US 81 at West northeastward to the Hill County line at a distance of 6.9 miles (11.1 km); approximately 0.2 miles (0.32 km) of the former Spur 53 was used for this highway. FM 2114 was extended eastward to FM 308 in Penelope on June 28, 1963. FM 2114 was extended westward to FM 56 and eastward to SH 171 in Hubbard on July 24, 1963; this extension replaced FM 2411 and FM 1888.

Junction list

County	Location	mi	km	Destinations	Notes
Bosque		0.0	0.0	FM 56 – Valley Mills, Laguna Park	
Hill		6.7	10.8	FM 1304 west	West end of FM 1304 overlap
Hill		6.9	11.1	FM 1304 east – Abbott	East end of FM 1304 overlap
Hill		9.1	14.6	FM 933 – Whitney, Gholson	
McLennan	West	17.5	28.2	I-35 / US 77 – Dallas, Fort Worth, Waco	I-35 exit 353
McLennan	West	18.2	29.3	FM 2311 south (Oak Street) – Leroy	
Hill	Penelope	29.5	47.5	FM 308 south – Leroy	West end of FM 308 overlap
Hill	Penelope	29.8	48.0	FM 308 north – Malone	East end of FM 308 overlap
Hill	Hubbard	38.2	61.5	SH 171 – Hillsboro, Hubbard	
1.000 mi = 1.609 km; 1.000 km = 0.621 mi

== FM 2115 ==
Farm to Market Road 2115
- Location: Bell County
- Length: 6.087 mi (9.796 km)
- Existed: October 28, 1953–present

Farm to Market Road 2115 (FM 2115) is located in Bell County. It runs from FM 487 east of Jarrell northward 6 miles (9.7 km) to I-35 exit 282 south of Salado.

FM 2115 was designated on October 28, 1953, along the current route.

== FM 2116 ==
Farm to Market Road 2116
- Location: Milam County
- Length: 2.459 mi (3.957 km)
- Existed: May 22, 1958–present

Farm to Market Road 2116 (FM 2116) is located in Milam County. State maintenance and the FM 2116 designation begin along a county road near Alcoa Lake. The route travels northeast 2.5 miles (4.0 km) to an intersection with FM 487 south of Praesel.

The current FM 2116 was designated on May 22, 1958, running 4 miles (6.4 km) from US 77 (now FM 487) to an Alcoa plant. The easternmost 1.5 miles (2.4 km) were returned to the county on July 25, 1960.

=== FM 2116 (1953) ===
Farm to Market Road 2116
- Location: Falls County
- Existed: October 28, 1953–April 22, 1958

A previous route numbered FM 2116 was designated on October 28, 1953, from SH 7 at Chilton northeastward 6.5 miles (10.5 km) to Satin. FM 2116 was cancelled on April 22, 1958, and transferred to FM 434.

== FM 2117 ==
Farm to Market Road 2117
- Location: Falls County
- Length: 4.739 mi (7.627 km)
- Existed: 1953–present

== FM 2118 ==
Farm to Market Road 2118
- Location: Red River County
- Length: 8.967 mi (14.431 km)
- Existed: 1953–present

== FM 2119 ==
Farm to Market Road 2119
- Location: Reeves and Culberson counties
- Length: 39.958 mi (64.306 km)
- Existed: 1953–present

Farm to Market Road 2119 (FM 2119) is located in Reeves and Culberson counties.

The western terminus of FM 2119 is at Duval Rd. at Rustler Springs in unincorporated Culberson County. The route travels southeast for approximately 40 miles (64 km) and crosses into Reeves County before ending at Bus. I-20-B near Pecos.

FM 2119 was established on October 28, 1953, as a 4-mile (6.4 km) road from its current southern terminus at Bus. I-20-B (then US 80) near Pecos. On January 23, 1980, the designation was extended approximately 36.7 miles (59.1 km) northwest to Rustler Springs.

== FM 2120 ==
Farm to Market Road 2120
- Location: Red River County
- Length: 9.388 mi (15.109 km)
- Existed: 1953–present

== FM 2121 ==
Farm to Market Road 2121
- Location: Lamar County
- Length: 2.138 mi (3.441 km)
- Existed: 1953–present

== FM 2122 ==
Farm to Market Road 2122
- Location: Lamar County
- Length: 4.921 mi (7.920 km)
- Existed: 1953–present

== FM 2123 ==
Farm to Market Road 2123
- Location: Wise County
- Length: 16.001 mi (25.751 km)
- Existed: 1953–present

== FM 2124 ==
Farm to Market Road 2124
- Location: Hemphill County
- Length: 6.403 mi (10.305 km)
- Existed: 1953–present

== FM 2125 ==
Farm to Market Road 2125
- Location: Brown County
- Length: 9.884 mi (15.907 km)
- Existed: 1953–present

== FM 2126 ==
Farm to Market Road 2126
- Location: Brown County
- Length: 5.918 mi (9.524 km)
- Existed: October 28, 1953–present

Farm to Market Road 2126 (FM 2126) is located in Brown County. It forms a portion of a beltway around the southeast side of Brownwood, running from FM 45 near Camp Bowie northeast to a junction with US 84/US 183 east of Early.

FM 2126 was designated on October 28, 1953, along the current route.

Junction list

The entire route is in Brown County.

Location	mi	km	Destinations	Notes
Brownwood	0.0	0.0	FM 45 – Richland Springs	Southern terminus
	1.4	2.3	FM 2524 north – Brownwood	
	4.4	7.1	FM 2525	
	5.9	9.5	US 84 / US 183 – Early, Goldthwaite	Northern terminus
1.000 mi = 1.609 km; 1.000 km = 0.621 mi

== FM 2127 ==
Farm to Market Road 2127
- Location: Jack, Montague, and Wise counties
- Length: 25.604 mi (41.206 km)
- Existed: December 19, 1955–present

Farm to Market Road 2127 (FM 2127) is located in northeastern Jack, far southwestern Montague, and northwestern Wise counties.

FM 2127 is a two-lane route for its entire length. It begins in Jack County at a junction with SH 148 between Jacksboro and Henrietta. The route travels generally to the east, through the community of Postoak. It intersects SH 59 south of Newport before turning to the southeast. The roadway briefly enters Montague County for about a half mile before reentering Jack County. FM 2127 continues into Wise County and to Crafton before turning to the south and reaching its terminus at FM 1810 near Lake Bridgeport.

The current designation of FM 2127 was established in Wise County on December 19, 1955, from SH 24 (now part of FM 1810) to Crafton. The route was extended into Jack County to FM 1125 on June 2, 1967, and further lengthened through Montague County over the western portion of FM 1125 to SH 148 on August 16, 1968.

Junction list

County	Location	mi	km	Destinations	Notes
Jack		0.0	0.0	SH 148 – Henrietta, Jacksboro	Western terminus
Jack		10.8	17.4	SH 59 – Newport, Jacksboro	
Montague				No major intersections	
Jack		16.2	26.1	FM 1125 – Bowie, Lake Amon G. Carter	
Wise		22.7	36.5	FM 2265 – Alvord	
Wise		25.6	41.2	FM 1810 – Chico	Eastern terminus
1.000 mi = 1.609 km; 1.000 km = 0.621 mi

=== FM 2127 (1953) ===
Farm to Market Road 2127
- Location: Delta County
- Existed: October 28, 1953–October 15, 1954

FM 2127 was first designated on October 28, 1953, as a route in Delta County, running from FM 1528 west to a road intersection at a distance of 1.6 miles (2.6 km). The highway was cancelled on October 15, 1954, with the highway being combined with FM 2068.

== FM 2128 ==
Farm to Market Road 2128
- Location: Hidalgo County
- Length: 4.439 mi (7.144 km)
- Existed: December 16, 1957–present

Farm to Market Road 2128 (FM 2128) is located in Hidalgo County in the Rio Grande Valley.

FM 2128 begins at an intersection with Bus. US 281 (Closner Boulevard) in Edinburg. The highway travels along Schunior Street through a residential area northeast of downtown. FM 2128 has a junction with I-69C/US 281 with Schunior Street becoming Richardson Road and runs through suburban areas of Cesar Chavez before entering an unincorporated area of the county. The highway continues to run through suburban areas before ending at an intersection with SH 107.

The current FM 2128 was designated on December 16, 1957, along the current route. The entire highway was internally redesignated as Urban Road 2128 (UR 2128) on June 27, 1995. The designation reverted to FM 2128 with the elimination of the Urban Road system on November 15, 2018.

=== FM 2128 (1953) ===
Farm to Market Road 2128
- Location: Howard County
- Existed: October 28, 1953–September 30, 1954

The first route numbered FM 2128 was designated on October 28, 1953, running from RM 33 south of Big Spring southwestward at a distance of 6.0 miles (9.7 km). The highway was cancelled and combined with FM 818 on September 30, 1954.

=== FM 2128 (1955) ===
Farm to Market Road 2128
- Location: Burleson County
- Existed: December 19, 1955–November 29, 1957

The second route numbered FM 2128 was designated on December 19, 1955, running from SH 21 southwest of Caldwell to a road intersection at a distance of 7.3 miles (11.7 km). The highway was extended 4.0 miles (6.4 km) to another road intersection near Black Jack Church on November 21, 1956. FM 2128 was cancelled on November 29, 1957, with the mileage being transferred to FM 908.

== FM 2129 ==
Farm to Market Road 2129
- Location: Schleicher and Sutton counties
- Length: 22.928 mi (36.899 km)
- Existed: August 24, 1955–present

Farm to Market Road 2129 (FM 2129) is located in Schleicher and Sutton counties.

FM 2129 begins at an intersection with RM 1312 and ends at an intersection with US 277 south of Eldorado.

The current FM 2129 was designated on August 24, 1955, running from US 277 westward at a distance of 8.0 miles (12.9 km). The highway was extended 3.0 miles (4.8 km) southwestward on September 27, 1960. FM 2129 was extended 11.5 miles (18.5 km) to US 290 (now RM 1312) on June 2, 1967.

=== FM 2129 (1953) ===
Farm to Market Road 2129
- Location: Hockley and Lamb counties
- Existed: October 28, 1953–December 31, 1954

FM 2129 was first designated on October 28, 1953, running from SH 290 (now SH 114) west of Levelland northward at a distance of 12.8 miles (20.6 km). The road was extended north 10.7 miles (17.2 km) to FM 54 on October 26, 1954. The designation was cancelled and the route's mileage was combined with that of FM 303 on December 31, 1954.

== FM 2130 ==
Farm to Market Road 2130
- Location: Hockley County
- Length: 16.265 mi (26.176 km)
- Existed: 1953–present

Farm to Market Road 2130 (FM 2130) is located in eastern Hockley County.

FM 2130 begins at an intersection with SH 114 east of Smyer. The highway runs in a mostly northern direction and intersects FM 2641 and has an overlap with FM 1294 before intersecting US 84 in the town of Roundup. FM 2130 continues to run north before ending at an intersection with FM 597 east of Anton.

FM 2130 was designated on October 28, 1953, running from FM 1175 (now FM 597) to US 84 at a distance of 2.8 miles (4.5 km). The highway was extended 13.9 miles (22.4 km) from US 84 to SH 290 (now SH 114) on October 26, 1954.

Junction list

The entire route is in Hockley County.

Location	mi	km	Destinations	Notes
	0.0	0.0	SH 114 – Levelland, Lubbock	
	5.5	8.9	FM 2641 east	
	7.2	11.6	FM 1294 west	South end of FM 1294 overlap
	8.2	13.2	FM 1294 east – Shallowater	North end of FM 1294 overlap
Roundup	13.5	21.7	US 84 – Littlefield, Lubbock	
	16.3	26.2	FM 597 – Anton, Abernathy	
1.000 mi = 1.609 km; 1.000 km = 0.621 mi: Concurrency terminus

== FM 2131 ==
Farm to Market Road 2131
- Location: Coleman County
- Length: 15.547 mi (25.020 km)
- Existed: 1953–present

== FM 2132 ==
Farm to Market Road 2132
- Location: Coleman and Runnels counties
- Length: 8.578 mi (13.805 km)
- Existed: 1953–present

== FM 2133 ==
Farm to Market Road 2133
- Location: Runnels County
- Length: 16.916 mi (27.224 km)
- Existed: 1953–present

== FM 2134 ==
Farm to Market Road 2134
- Location: Concho and Coleman counties
- Length: 24.922 mi (40.108 km)
- Existed: October 28, 1953 (Note: FM 2134 was designated as RM 2134 from October 31, 1957, to May 5, 1992.)–present

Farm to Market Road 2134 (FM 2134) comprises two discontinuous segments in Concho and Coleman counties. The Concho County segment is 18.7 miles (30.1 km) long and begins at US 87 east of Eden. It runs northward via Millersview, where it intersects FM 765, before ending at FM 1929 near the southwestern side of O.H. Ivie Reservoir at the confluence of the Concho River and Colorado River. FM 2134 resumes in Coleman County at the eastern shore of the reservoir. It runs eastward approximately 6.3 miles (10.1 km), intersecting RE 9, before ending at FM 503 south of Voss.

FM 2134 was designated October 28, 1953, from FM 765 at Millersview northward 5 miles (8.0 km). It was extended northward 3.2 miles (5.1 km) on October 26, 1954, and then northeastward 4.5 miles (7.2 km) to the Colorado River on August 24, 1955. The route was renumbered Ranch to Market Road 2134 (RM 2134) and was extended to FM 566 (now FM 503) on October 31, 1957. The southward extension to US 87 occurred on May 5, 1966 (replacing FM 2743). The roadway was divided into two segments due to the construction of the reservoir in the late 1980s; access to the Concho River shore of the reservoir is now provided by RE 11. The designation of the route reverted to FM 2134 on May 5, 1992.

== FM 2135 ==
Farm to Market Road 2135
- Location: Johnson County
- Length: 5.255 mi (8.457 km)
- Existed: September 20, 1961–present

=== FM 2135 (1953) ===
Farm to Market Road 2135
- Location: Scleicher County
- Existed: October 29, 1953–October 4, 1960

A previous route numbered FM 2135 was designated on October 29, 1953, from RM 33 (now US 190), 12.4 miles (20.0 km) west of Eldorado, to a point 5.0 miles (8.0 km) north. FM 2135 was cancelled on October 4, 1960, and transferred to FM 1828.

== FM 2136 ==
Farm to Market Road 2136
- Location: Bosque County
- Length: 8.806 mi (14.172 km)
- Existed: 1953–present

== FM 2137 ==
Farm to Market Road 2137
- Location: Cherokee and Smith counties
- Length: 5.233 mi (8.422 km)
- Existed: 1953–present

Farm to Market Road 2137 (FM 2137) runs about 5.2 miles (8.4 km) from an intersection with FM 855 in Cherokee County northeast to an intersection with FM 344 in Smith County.

FM 2137 was designated on October 28, 1953.

== FM 2138 ==
Farm to Market Road 2138
- Location: Cherokee County
- Length: 10.903 mi (17.547 km)
- Existed: 1953–present

Farm to Market Road 2138 (Maydelle Highway) is a 10.903-mile (17.547 km) state road in Cherokee County, that connects U.S. Route 84 in Maydelle with FM 347 in Jacksonville.

== RM 2139 ==
Ranch to Market Road 2139
- Location: Sterling County
- Length: 12.847 mi (20.675 km)
- Existed: November 3, 1972–present

Ranch to Market Road 2139 (RM 2139) is located in Sterling County. State maintenance and the RM 2139 designation begin at a point on Old Big Lake Road southwest of Sterling City. The route travels northeast 12.8 miles (20.6 km) to an intersection with SH 163.

RM 2139 was designated on November 3, 1972, running from SH 163 southwestward 5 miles (8.0 km). It was extended 4 miles (6.4 km) on October 21, 1981.

=== FM 2139 (1953) ===
Farm to Market Road 2139
- Location: Cherokee County
- Existed: October 28, 1953–January 31, 1972

Farm to Market Road 2139 (FM 2139) was designated in Cherokee County on October 28, 1953, from FM 752 southeastward 6.5 miles (10.5 km) to SH 294 at Alto. FM 2139 was cancelled on January 31, 1972, and combined with FM 752.

== FM 2140 ==
Farm to Market Road 2140
- Location: Shelby County
- Length: 2.875 mi (4.627 km)
- Existed: 1953–present

== FM 2141 ==
Farm to Market Road 2141
- Location: Shelby County
- Length: 1.87 mi (3.01 km)
- Existed: 1953–present

== FM 2142 ==
Farm to Market Road 2142
- Location: Fisher and Jones counties
- Length: 11.091 mi (17.849 km)
- Existed: March 29, 1957–present

=== FM 2142 (1953) ===
Farm to Market Road 2142
- Location: Austin County
- Existed: October 28, 1953–October 15, 1954

The original FM 2142 as designated on October 28, 1953, from SH 36 in Sealy to a point 5.4 miles (8.7 km) northwest. On September 27, 1954, the road was extended northwest 6.0 miles (9.7 km) to FM 1088 (now FM 949). FM 2142 was cancelled on October 15, 1954, and became a portion of FM 1094.

== FM 2143 ==
Farm to Market Road 2143
- Location: Calhoun County
- Length: 4.589 mi (7.385 km)
- Existed: 1953–present

== FM 2144 ==
Farm to Market Road 2144
- Location: Colorado County
- Length: 5.159 mi (8.303 km)
- Existed: 1953–present

== FM 2145 ==
Farm to Market Road 2145
- Location: Fayette County
- Length: 10.052 mi (16.177 km)
- Existed: 1953–present

FM 2145 begins at an intersection with U.S. Route 77 at the northern edge of La Grange. The highway travels in a north-northeast direction, passes through Nechanitz and after curving southeast, terminates passing Waldeck Church Ln and merging with FM 1291 just southwest of Waldeck.

== FM 2146 ==
Farm to Market Road 2146
- Location: Atascosa County
- Length: 12.76 mi (Note: The certified length given is shorter than the actual mileage, as the TxDOT description of FM 2146 considers it to be discontinuous at rather than concurrent with SH 173.) (20.54 km)
- Existed: 1953–present

Farm to Market Road 2146 (FM 2146) is located in Atascosa County.

FM 2146 begins at an intersection with FM 1333 north of Charlotte. The highway travels in a more eastern direction and turns northeast at County Road 300. FM 2146 has a brief overlap with SH 173 northwest of Jourdanton and runs through the town of Amphion. The highway continues to run in a northeast direction and ends at an intersection with FM 476 northwest of Poteet.

FM 2146 was designated on October 28, 1953, running from FM 476 near Poteet to SH 173 at a distance of 6.3 miles (10.1 km). The highway was extended southwestward of SH 173 on September 5, 1973, absorbing FM 3235 in the process.

Junction list

The entire route is in Atascosa County.

Location	mi	km	Destinations	Notes
	0.0	0.0	FM 1333 – Charlotte	
	6.3	10.1	SH 173 north – Devine	South end of SH 173 overlap
	6.6	10.6	SH 173 south – Jourdanton	North end of SH 173 overlap
	13.1	21.1	FM 476 – Somerset, Poteet	
1.000 mi = 1.609 km; 1.000 km = 0.621 mi: Concurrency terminus

== RM 2147 ==
Ranch to Market Road 2147
- Location: Llano and Burnet counties
- Length: 13.278 mi (Note: The certified length given is shorter than the actual mileage, as the TxDOT description of RM 2147 considers it to be discontinuous at rather than concurrent with US 281.) (21.369 km)
- Existed: September 27, 1960–present

Ranch to Market Road 2147 (RM 2147) is located in Llano and Burnet counties.

RM 2147 begins at an intersection with SH 71 near Horseshoe Bay. The highway travels through Horseshoe Bay and Cottonwood Shores, running parallel to the Colorado River, Lake LBJ and Lake Marble Falls. RM 2147 enters the southern portion of Marble Falls and begins an overlap with US 281. The two highways travel south and RM 2147 leaves the overlap and travels in a mostly eastward direction before ending at County Road 402.

RM 2147 was designated on September 27, 1960, running from US 281 to the Alvin Writz Dam at a distance of 4.7 miles (7.6 km). The highway was extended 5.1 miles (8.2 km) to RM 93 (now SH 71) on June 28, 1963. RM 2147 was extended along US 281 and 4.3 miles (6.9 km) east of US 281 on November 5, 1971.

Junction list

County	Location	mi	km	Destinations	Notes
Llano		0.0	0.0	SH 71 – Llano, Austin	
Burnet	Marble Falls	9.5	15.3	US 281 north – Burnet	West end of US 281 overlap
Burnet	Marble Falls	11.0	17.7	US 281 south – Johnson City	East end of US 281 overlap
Burnet		14.8	23.8	County Road 402	
1.000 mi = 1.609 km; 1.000 km = 0.621 mi: Concurrency terminus

=== FM 2147 (1953) ===
Farm to Market Road 2147
- Location: Frio County
- Existed: October 28, 1953–December 16, 1959

FM 2147 was designated on October 28, 1953, running from FM 472 at Big Foot to a road intersection at a distance of 7.0 miles (11.3 km). FM 2147 became part of FM 472 on May 18, 1954, and FM 2147 was reassigned to an 8.4 miles (13.5 km) route from FM 472 to US 81 at Moore that was a redesignation of the old route of FM 472. FM 2147 was cancelled on December 16, 1959, with the mileage being transferred to FM 462.

== FM 2148 ==
Farm to Market Road 2148
- Location: Bowie County
- Length: 11.893 mi (19.140 km)
- Existed: 1953–present

== FM 2149 ==
Farm to Market Road 2149
- Location: Bowie County
- Length: 11.768 mi (18.939 km)
- Existed: 1953–present

== FM 2150 ==
Farm to Market Road 2150
- Location: Lubbock and Crosby counties
- Length: 5.795 mi (9.326 km)
- Existed: September 21, 1955–present

Farm to Market Road 2150 (FM 2150) is located in Lubbock and Crosby counties.

FM 2150 begins at an intersection with Bus. US 84 in Slaton. The highway travels in an eastern direction through rural areas and enters Crosby County before state maintenance ends at County Road 254.

The current FM 2150 was designated on September 21, 1955, running from US 84 eastward to a road intersection at a distance of 3.8 miles (6.1 km). The highway was extended 1.0 mile (1.6 km) eastward to the Crosby County line on November 24, 1959. FM 2150 was extended eastward 1.1 miles (1.8 km) on November 3, 1972.

=== FM 2150 (1953) ===
Farm to Market Road 2150
- Location: Cass County
- Existed: October 28, 1953–November 1, 1954

FM 2150 was first designated on October 28, 1953, running from SH 11 at Hughes Springs northward to a road intersection at a distance of 4.7 miles (7.6 km). The highway was cancelled and combined with FM 161 on November 1, 1954.

== FM 2151 ==
Farm to Market Road 2151
- Location: Cass County
- Existed: October 28, 1953–June 5, 1987

Farm to Market Road 2151 (FM 2151) was located in Cass County. It was designated on October 28, 1953, running from FM 249 south of Bloomburg to SH 77 at a distance of 4.7 miles (7.6 km). The highway was cancelled on June 5, 1987, with the mileage being transferred to FM 3129.

== FM 2152 ==
Farm to Market Road 2152
- Location: Titus County
- Length: 8.423 mi (13.556 km)
- Existed: 1953–present

== FM 2153 ==
Farm to Market Road 2153
- Location: Denton County
- Length: 5.845 mi (9.407 km)
- Existed: September 21, 1955–present

Farm to Market Road 2153 (FM 2153) is located in Denton County, running from FM 2164 east of Sanger to FM 428 northeast of Denton.

The current FM 2153 was designated on September 21, 1955, running from SH 10 (now FM 428) to a road intersection at a distance of 4.3 miles (6.9 km). The highway was extended 1.5 miles (2.4 km) to FM 2164 in 1960.

=== FM 2153 (1953) ===
Farm to Market Road 2153
- Location: McMullen County
- Existed: October 28, 1953–October 27, 1954

A previous route numbered FM 2153 was designated on October 28, 1953, running from FM 63 at Calliham northward at a distance of 5.5 miles (8.9 km). On October 13, 1954, the road was extended north 3.0 miles (4.8 km) to the Live Oak County line. The highway was cancelled and combined with FM 99 on October 27, 1954.

== FM 2154 ==
Farm to Market Road 2154
- Location: Brazos County
- Length: 19.747 mi (31.780 km)
- Existed: 1953–present

Farm to Market Road 2154 (FM 2154) is located in Brazos County. It runs from SH 6, 4.5 miles (7.2 km) northwest of Navasota, northwestward via Millican and Wellborn, to FM 60 in College Station. It is known as Wellborn Road in College Station, which continues past its terminus at FM 60 into Bryan. Much of the route parallels a Union Pacific Railroad line, which serves as the dividing line between the Main Campus and the West Campus of Texas A&M University.

FM 2154 was designated on October 28, 1953, from FM 60 in College Station southeast and south 6.7 miles (10.8 km) to Wellborn. On October 31, 1958, the road was extended 8.3 miles (13.4 km) to Millican. On May 6, 1964, a 5.5-mile (8.9 km) section from Millican to SH 6 was added and the currency with FM 159 in Millican was removed. On December 14, 1989, a 1.6-mile (2.6 km) section from the end of the route to FM 1179 was added. On June 1, 1991, a new one way pair was proposed between FM 2154 and FM 3518 between FM 60 and FM 1179, replacing FM 3518, but this was not included in the mileage of FM 2154 as it was a one-way pair. On June 27, 1995, the section from FM 2818 to FM 1179 was redesignated Urban Road 2154 (UR 2154); the 1989 extension was also cancelled. The designation of this segment reverted to FM 2154 with the elimination of the Urban Road system on November 15, 2018.

Junction list

The entire route is in Brazos County.

Location	mi	km	Destinations	Notes
	0.0	0.0	SH 6 – College Station, Navasota	Interchange; future I-14
Millican	5.1	8.2	FM 159	
College Station	15.0	24.1	SH 40 east (William D. Fitch Parkway)	
College Station	17.2	27.7	FM 2818 (Harvey Mitchell Parkway)	Interchange
College Station	18.8	30.3	FM 2347 east (George Bush Drive) – Easterwood Airport, George Bush Library	
College Station	19.2	30.9	Old Main Drive – Texas A&M University	Interchange
College Station	19.7	31.7	FM 60 (University Drive, Raymond Stotzer Parkway)	Interchange
1.000 mi = 1.609 km; 1.000 km = 0.621 mi

== FM 2155 ==
Farm to Market Road 2155
- Location: Burleson County
- Length: 5.372 mi (8.645 km)
- Existed: 1953–present

== FM 2156 ==
Farm to Market Road 2156
- Location: Erath and Comanche counties
- Length: 14.002 mi (22.534 km)
- Existed: 1953–present

== FM 2157 ==
Farm to Market Road 2157
- Location: Howard County
- Length: 7.3 mi (11.7 km)
- Existed: August 30, 1988–present

Farm to Market Road 2157 (FM 2157) is a proposed road from FM 700 southwestward 7.3 miles (11.7 km) to US 87 in Big Spring.

=== FM 2157 (1953) ===
Farm to Market Road 2157
- Location: Erath and Hood counties
- Existed: October 28, 1953–December 20, 1984

A previous route numbered FM 2157 was designated on October 28, 1953, from US 281 in Stephenville east 4.3 miles (6.9 km) to a road intersection. On August 24, 1955, the road was extended east 7.4 miles (11.9 km) to a road intersection in Cedar Point. On May 6, 1964, the road was extended east 4.3 miles (6.9 km). On November 25, 1975, the road was extended east and north 0.4 miles (0.64 km) to the county line. On January 2, 1976, the road was extended northeast 9.3 miles (15.0 km) to US 377 west of Tolar, replacing FM 2870, but six months later this section was transferred back to FM 2870 while FM 2157 was rerouted to FM 204 near Paluxy. FM 2157 was cancelled on December 20, 1984, by district request and transferred to FM 205; at the same time, FM 204 was transferred to FM 51.

== FM 2158 ==
Farm to Market Road 2158
- Location: Madison County
- Length: 5.057 mi (8.138 km)
- Existed: 1953–present

== FM 2159 ==
Farm to Market Road 2159
- Location: Robertson County
- Length: 8.566 mi (13.786 km)
- Existed: 1953–present

== FM 2160 ==
Farm to Market Road 2160
- Location: Houston County
- Length: 3.07 mi (4.94 km)
- Existed: September 21, 1956–present

=== FM 2160 (1953) ===
Farm to Market Road 2160
- Location: Walker County
- Existed: October 29, 1953–September 29, 1955

A previous route numbered FM 2160 was designated on October 29, 1953, from US 75 at New Waverly northwest 6.2 miles (10.0 km) to a road intersection. FM 2160 was cancelled on September 29, 1955, and transferred to FM 1374.

== FM 2161 ==
Farm to Market Road 2161
- Location: Carson County
- Length: 12.781 mi (20.569 km)
- Existed: 1953–present

== FM 2162 ==
Farm to Market Road 2162
- Location: Donley County
- Length: 9.637 mi (15.509 km)
- Existed: 1953–present

== FM 2163 ==
Farm to Market Road 2163
- Location: Haskell County
- Length: 17.062 mi (27.459 km)
- Existed: 1953–present

== FM 2164 ==
Farm to Market Road 2164
- Location: Denton County
- Length: 9.784 mi (15.746 km)
- Existed: 1953–present

Farm to Market Road 2164 (FM 2164) is located in Denton County.

FM 2164 begins at an intersection with US 77 in Denton. The highway travels along N. Locust Street and travels through suburban areas of the city with the route becoming more rural north of Loop 288. FM 2164 leaves the city near FM 3163 and travels through farm land with some rural subdivisions and has a brief overlap with FM 455 in eastern Sanger near the southwestern shore of Lake Ray Roberts. The highway ends at an intersection with FM 1190 west of the lake.

FM 2164 was designated on October 28, 1953, running from US 77 northward to a road intersection at a distance of 4.2 miles (6.8 km). The highway was extended 1.2 miles (1.9 km) to a road intersection north of Clear Creek on October 31, 1957. FM 2164 was extended to FM 455 on January 24, 1959. The section of highway between US 77 and Loop 288 was internally redesignated as Urban Road 2164 (UR 2164) on June 27, 1995. The designation reverted to FM 2164 with the elimination of the Urban Road system on November 15, 2018.

Junction list

The entire route is in Denton County.

Location	mi	km	Destinations	Notes
Denton	0.0	0.0	US 77 – Denton, Gainesville	
Denton	1.3	2.1	Loop 288	
Denton	4.0	6.4	FM 3163 west	
	7.4	11.9	FM 2153 east to FM 428	
Sanger	9.2	14.8	FM 455 east – Pilot Point	South end of FM 455 overlap
Sanger	9.3	15.0	FM 455 west – Sanger	North end of FM 455 overlap
	9.8	15.8	FM 1190	
1.000 mi = 1.609 km; 1.000 km = 0.621 mi

== FM 2165 ==
Farm to Market Road 2165
- Location: Aransas County
- Length: 2.421 mi (3.896 km)
- Existed: 1953–present

== RM 2166 ==
Ranch to Market Road 2166
- Location: Tom Green County
- Length: 3.731 mi (6.004 km)
- Existed: June 2, 1967–present

=== FM 2166 ===
Farm to Market Road 2166
- Location: Hall and Collingsworth counties
- Existed: October 28, 1953–June 1, 1966

FM 2166 was designated on October 28, 1953 from SH 256 (now US 287) in Memphis northeast 2.1 miles to the Collingsworth County line. On August 1, 1963 the road was extended northeast 14 miles to FM 1056 south of Quail. FM 2366 was cancelled on June 1, 1966 and became a portion of FM 1547.

== FM 2167 ==
Farm to Market Road 2167 (FM 2167) is a designation that has been used twice. No highway currently uses the FM 2167 designation.

=== FM 2167 (1953) ===
Farm to Market Road 2167
- Location: Wheeler County
- Existed: October 29, 1953–June 1, 1962

The first route numbered FM 2167 was designated on October 28, 1953, from US 83 in Wheeler southwest and west 5.8 miles (9.3 km) to a road intersection. On May 26, 1954, the eastern terminus was moved to SH 152. On October 31, 1957, the road was extended west and south 5.0 miles (8.0 km) to a point across the Red River. FM 2167 was cancelled on June 1, 1962, and transferred to FM 2473.

=== FM 2167 (1963) ===
Farm to Market Road 2167
- Location: Briscoe County
- Existed: March 21, 1963–October 27, 1994

The second route numbered FM 2167 was designated on March 21, 1963, from SH 256 9.5 miles (15.3 km) east of Silverton, south 1.3 miles (2.1 km) to the Haynes Boy Scout Camp (now Caprock Canyons State Park and Trailway). This route was formerly FM 1986 from 1954 to 1956. TxDOT stopped maintaining the road on February 3, 1982, after a locked gate was set up across the road, although it retained the FM designation. FM 2167 was cancelled and removed from the state highway system on October 27, 1994, because the road was blocked by the gate.

== FM 2168 ==
Farm to Market Road 2168
- Location: Wheeler County
- Length: 3.118 mi (5.018 km)
- Existed: 1953–present

== FM 2169 ==
Farm to Market Road 2169
- Location: Kimble County
- Length: 15.62 mi (Note: The certified length given is shorter than the actual mileage, as the TxDOT description of FM 2169 considers it to be discontinuous at rather than concurrent with Loop 481 and the Interstate 10 frontage road.) (25.14 km)
- Existed: 1953–present

Farm to Market Road 2169 (FM 2169) is located in Kimble County in the Texas Hill Country.

FM 2169 begins at an intersection with US 377 in Junction. The highway runs south along Flatrock Lane and leaves the Junction city limits after crossing the South Llano River and turns to the east near the campus of Texas Tech University at Junction and runs through hilly terrain and intersects with Loop 481. FM 2169 has a short overlap with Loop 481 and leaves the overlap near Lake Junction before re-entering Junction along Martinez Street and interchanging with I-10/US 83. The highway traverses hilly terrain, running east and south before meeting I-10 again, this time in Segovia. FM 2169 continues to run through hills and intersects with RM 479 before ending at I-10 northwest of Mountain Home.

FM 2169 was designated on October 28, 1953, running from US 290 near Junction, northeastward and eastward at a distance of 2.7 miles (4.3 km). The highway was extended 7.0 miles (11.3 km) to US 290 near Segovia on October 31, 1957. FM 2169 was extended 1.5 miles (2.4 km) southwest of US 290 near Junction on October 31, 1958. The highway was extended 3.93 miles (6.32 km) over an old section of US 290 on November 31, 1969, with the construction of I-10. FM 2169 was extended 0.7 miles (1.1 km) along Flatrock Lane in Junction to US 377 on January 28, 2010.

Junction list

The entire route is in Kimble County.

Location	mi	km	Destinations	Notes
Junction	0.0	0.0	US 377 – Rocksprings	
	2.1	3.4	Loop 481 east	West end of Loop 481 overlap
	2.4	3.9	Loop 481 west – Junction	East end of Loop 481 overlap
Junction	3.3	5.3	I-10 / US 83 – Fort Stockton, San Antonio	I-10 exit 457
Segovia	12.3	19.8	I-10 – San Antonio	I-10 exit 465
	15.8	25.4	RM 479 south – Noxville	
	16.5	26.6	I-10	I-10 exit 472
1.000 mi = 1.609 km; 1.000 km = 0.621 mi: Concurrency terminus

== FM 2170 ==
Farm to Market Road 2170
- Location: Collin County
- Length: 1.63 mi (2.62 km)
- Existed: 1953–present

Farm to Market Road 2170 (FM 2170) is located in Collin County.

FM 2170 begins at an intersection with FM 2551 (Angel Parkway) in Allen. The highway travels east and enters Lucas near Lovejoy High School. FM 2170 travels through the Lovejoy area and ends at an intersection with FM 1378 (Country Club Road). The highway is known as Main Street in Allen and Estates Parkway in Lucas.

FM 2170 was designated on October 28, 1953, running from SH 121 southeastward to US 75 near Allen at a distance of 4.3 miles (6.9 km). The highway was extended 5.5 miles (8.9 km) southeastward of US 75 to a road intersection in Parker on October 26, 1954. The section of FM 2170 between SH 121 and US 75 was cancelled, as 2.3 miles (3.7 km) were renumbered as FM 2319 and FM 2170 was rerouted to continue west to the US 75 freeway. On September 27, 1957, FM 2319 was cancelled in exchange for extending FM 2448 (later became part of FM 2478, but this section was given to the city in 1988; FM 2448 was reassigned to another route) north from Bethany to SH 121. FM 2170 was rerouted again on October 31, 1958, with part of FM 2170 absorbing a section of FM 2551 with part of the old FM 2170 becoming a part of FM 1378. The highway was extended 3.3 miles (5.3 km) to FM 2478 on June 28, 1963. The entire highway was internally redesignated as Urban Road 2170 (UR 2170) on June 27, 1995. On August 28, 1997, the section west of SH 5 was given to the city of Allen. On September 30, 2004, the section west of FM 2551 as given to the city of Allen. The designation of the remaining segment of UR 2170 reverted to FM 2170 with the elimination of the Urban Road system on November 15, 2018.

== FM 2171 ==
Farm to Market Road 2171
- Location: Hutchinson County
- Length: 4.322 mi (6.956 km)
- Existed: 1953–present

== FM 2172 ==
Farm to Market Road 2172
- Location: Lipscomb County
- Length: 9.088 mi (14.626 km)
- Existed: 1953–present

== FM 2173 ==
Farm to Market Road 2173
- Location: Bexar County
- Existed: October 28, 1953–September 4, 1973

Farm to Market Road 2173 (FM 2173) was located in southwest Bexar County.

FM 2173 was designated on October 28, 1953, from US 81 (now I-35), 1.5 miles (2.4 km) south of Von Ormy, north 4.4 miles (7.1 km) to Macdona. On September 21, 1955, a 4.0-mile (6.4 km) section from US 81 to FM 1518 at Somerset was added. On January 27, 1971, a section from Macdona to a point 1.32 miles (2.12 km) south was cancelled. FM 2173 was cancelled on September 4, 1973: the section from FM 1518 to a point 0.5 miles (0.80 km) north was cancelled and the section from 0.5 miles (0.80 km) north of FM 1518 to a point 6.2 miles (10.0 km) became FM 1604 (now Loop 1604).

== FM 2174 ==
Farm to Market Road 2174
- Location: Hood and Somervell counties
- Length: 4.253 mi (6.845 km)
- Existed: 1953–present

== FM 2175 ==
Farm to Market Road 2175
- Location: Matagorda County
- Length: 2.137 mi (3.439 km)
- Existed: 1953–present

== FM 2176 ==
Farm to Market Road 2176
- Location: Potter County
- Length: 6.049 mi (9.735 km)
- Existed: 1953–present

Farm to Market Road 2176 (FM 2176) is located in Potter County, mostly traveling through more rural areas of northwestern Amarillo.

FM 2176 begins at the intersection of Broadway Drive and Hughes Street. The highway travels north along Broadway Drive and runs along the western edge of the Ross Golf Course until intersecting Hastings Avenue. FM 2176 passes a vineyard and leaves the city limits at an interchange with Loop 335. The highway briefly travels through suburban areas of unincorporated Potter County and turns east onto Givens Avenue before ending at FM 1719.

FM 2176 was designated on October 29, 1953, along its current route, except it extended north to US 87/US 287. The route was redesignated Urban Road 2176 (UR 2176) in 1995. On March 31, 2005, the section along Givens Avenue was transferred to FM 1719. The designation of the remaining segment of UR 2176 reverted to FM 2176 with the elimination of the Urban Road system on November 15, 2018.

== FM 2177 ==
Farm to Market Road 2177
- Location: Orange County
- Length: 1.936 mi (3.116 km)
- Existed: 1953–present

== FM 2178 ==
Farm to Market Road 2178
- Location: Young and Archer counties
- Length: 18.781 mi (30.225 km)
- Existed: 1953–present

== FM 2179 ==
Farm to Market Road 2179
- Location: Young County
- Length: 6.206 mi (9.988 km)
- Existed: 1953–present

== FM 2180 ==
Farm to Market Road 2180
- Location: Baylor County
- Length: 4.922 mi (7.921 km)
- Existed: 1953–present

== FM 2181 ==
Farm to Market Road 2181
- Location: Denton County
- Length: 8.605 mi (13.848 km)
- Existed: September 21, 1955–present

Farm to Market Road 2181 (FM 2181) is located in the northern part of the Dallas-Fort Worth Metroplex. The highway runs as a "loop" of I-35E, serving many housing developments in Corinth, Copper Canyon, and Denton.

FM 2181 begins at an intersection with I-35E in southern Corinth, near Lake Dallas and Hickory. To the east of this intersection, the road continues as Swisher Road towards the Lewisville Lake Toll Bridge.

FM 2181 runs as an east–west highway from I-35E to Old Alton Road, despite being signed north–south. The highway turns north, running through the southern part of Denton. At Teasley Road, the highway turns west–east again, and then turns north–south, before ending at I-35E a few miles southeast of UNT. Teasley Road continues north of I-35 as a local road.

As of 2015 the stretch between I-35E in Corinth and FM 2499 is being widened to a divided highway to accommodate urban growth.

The current FM 2181 was designated on September 21, 1955, from Bus. US 77 south 4.0 miles (6.4 km). On May 2, 1962, it was extended south and east 5.4 miles (8.7 km) to I-35E. On May 16, 1988, the section from US 77 south to I-35E was removed from the state highway system. In 1995, the route was redesignated Urban Road 2181 (UR 2181). The designation reverted to FM 2181 with the elimination of the Urban Road system on November 15, 2018.

Junction list

The entire highway is in Denton County.

Location	mi	km	Destinations	Notes
Corinth	0.0	0.0	I-35E / Swisher Road	I-35E exit 458; southern terminus; continues east as Swisher Road.
Corinth	3.2	5.1	FM 2499 (Village Parkway) – Flower Mound, Corinth	Barrel Strap Road north of FM 2181
Denton	8.6	13.8	I-35E	I-35E exit 465A; northern terminus.
1.000 mi = 1.609 km; 1.000 km = 0.621 mi

=== FM 2181 (1953) ===
Farm to Market Road 2181
- Location: Baylor County
- Existed: October 28, 1953–August 24, 1955

FM 2181 was designated on October 28, 1953, from SH 199 (now SH 114), 1.2 miles (1.9 km) southeast of Wendover, south and west 3.2 miles (5.1 km) to a road intersection. On April 20, 1954, the eastern terminus was relocated farther east along SH 199, lengthening the route by 0.7 miles (1.1 km). FM 2181 was cancelled on August 21, 1955, and transferred to FM 1285.

== FM 2182 ==
Farm to Market Road 2182
- Location: Cochran County
- Length: 2.174 mi (3.499 km)
- Existed: November 24, 1959–present

=== FM 2182 (1953) ===
Farm to Market Road 2182
- Location: Wichita and Wilbarger counties
- Existed: October 29, 1953–February 2, 1959

A previous route numbered FM 2182 was designated on October 29, 1953, from SH 25, 1.1 miles (1.8 km) south of Electra, southwest 7.5 miles (12.1 km) to a road intersection. FM 2182 was cancelled on February 2, 1959, and transferred to FM 1811.

== FM 2183 ==
Farm to Market Road 2183
- Location: Mitchell and Howard counties
- Length: 13.584 mi (21.861 km)
- Existed: March 29, 1957–present

=== FM 2183 (1953) ===
Farm to Market Road 2183
- Location: Wilbarger County
- Existed: October 29, 1953–November 1, 1955

A previous route numbered FM 2183 was designated on October 29, 1953, from US 70, northwest 1.9 miles (3.1 km) to the Foard County line. FM 2183 was cancelled on November 1, 1955, and transferred to FM 98.

== FM 2184 ==
Farm to Market Road 2184
- Location: Bell County
- Length: 10.412 mi (16.756 km)
- Existed: 1953–present

== FM 2185 ==
Farm to Market Road 2185
- Location: Culberson County
- Length: 41.818 mi (67.300 km)
- Existed: 1953–present

Farm to Market Road 2185 (FM 2185) is located in Culberson County in West Texas. It is 41 miles (66 km) in length.

The southern terminus of FM 2185 is at SH 54 in Van Horn. FM 2118 follows East 9th Street east out of Van Horn towards Culberson County Airport. It intersects FM 2809. The highway continues northward to RM 652.

FM 2185 was established on October 28, 1953, as a 15.0-mile-long (24.1 km) road from its current southern terminus at SH 54 in Van Horn, northeastward to Wild Horse Farming District. On July 11, 1968, the highway was extended approximately 11.5 miles (18.5 km) northeastward. It was extended again on October 1 of that year to RM 652, a total of approximately 81.1 miles (130.5 km). On April 30, 1991, FM 2185 was split into two segments, as the central section (from 12.7 miles (20.4 km) south of RM 652 to 6.2 miles (10.0 km) south of RM 652) was removed from the state highway system and returned to the county for maintenance. On January 26, 2006, the northern section of FM 2185 was redesignated FM 3541, and the section from 42.4 miles (68.2 km) northeast of SH 54 to 12.7 miles (20.4 km) south of RM 652 was removed from the state highway system and returned to the county for maintenance. On August 27, 2020, the deleted portions of FM 2185 were restored, replacing FM 3541 and returning the road to its previous length.

== FM 2186 ==
Farm to Market Road 2186
- Location: Ranadll County
- Length: 7.429 mi (11.956 km)
- Existed: October 31, 1958–present

Farm to Market Road 2186 (FM 2186) is located in Randall County, running southwest of Amarillo.

FM 2186 begins at an intersection with Bushland Road near a rural subdivision. The highway travels east along Hollywood Road through mostly rural areas of Randall County. FM 2186 passes by a subdivision near FM 2590 and enters Amarillo before ending at an intersection with Loop 335.

The current FM 2186 was designated on October 31, 1958, running from US 60/US 87 southwest of Amarillo to a road intersection at a distance of 8.5 miles (13.7 km). Part of FM 2186 was transferred to Loop 335 when that highway was extended around southern and western Amarillo in 1977. On April 26, 2018, the section of FM 2186 from Helium Road to FM 2590 (old intersection of Loop 335) was transferred to Loop 335 when it was rerouted.

=== FM 2186 (1953) ===
Farm to Market Road 2186
- Location: Tom Green County
- Existed: October 29, 1953–March 24, 1958

A previous route numbered FM 2186 was designated on October 29, 1953, running from US 87 near Water Valley southwestward and westward at a distance of 8.2 miles (13.2 km). The highway was cancelled on March 24, 1958, with the mileage being transferred to RM 2034.

== FM 2187 ==
Farm to Market Road 2187
- Location: Austin County
- Length: 11.904 mi (19.158 km)
- Existed: June 28, 1963–present

=== FM 2187 (1953) ===
Farm to Market Road 2187
- Location: San Patricio County
- Existed: October 29, 1953–July 24, 1963

A previous route numbered FM 2187 was designated on October 29, 1953, from FM 630, south 4.0 miles (6.4 km) to SH 9 (now I-37) at Edroy. On October 31, 1957, the road was extended north 5.0 miles (8.0 km) from FM 630 to a road intersection. FM 2187 was cancelled on July 24, 1963, and transferred to FM 796.

== FM 2188 ==
Farm to Market Road 2188
- Location: McLennan County
- Length: 2.232 mi (3.592 km)
- Existed: October 31, 1957–present

=== FM 2188 (1953) ===
Farm to Market Road 2188
- Location: Montague County
- Existed: December 2, 1953–January 10, 1957

A previous route numbered FM 2188 was designated on December 2, 1953, from SH 175 in Montague northwest 4.6 miles (7.4 km) to a county road. FM 2188 was cancelled on January 10, 1957, and transferred to FM 1806.

== FM 2189 ==
Farm to Market Road 2189
- Location: San Augustine County
- Length: 1.713 mi (2.757 km)
- Existed: April 25, 1978–present

Farm to Market Road 2189 (FM 2189) is located in San Augustine County. It runs from FM 2390 southeastward 1.7 miles (2.7 km) before state maintenance ends. The route is located within the Angelina National Forest.

FM 2189 was designated on April 25, 1978, along the current route.

=== FM 2189 (1953) ===
Farm to Market Road 2189
- Location: Bailey County
- Existed: December 2, 1953–September 19, 1968

A previous route numbered FM 2189 was designated in Bailey County on December 2, 1953, from SH 214, 3 miles (4.8 km) north of Enochs, east 4.5 miles (7.2 km) to FM 54. FM 2189 was cancelled on September 19, 1968, and became a portion of FM 37.

=== RM 2189 ===
Ranch to Market Road 2189
- Location: Reeves County
- Existed: August 4, 1971–July 31, 1974

Ranch to Market Road 2189 (RM 2189) was designated in Reeves County on August 4, 1971, from I-10, about 3.6 miles (5.8 km) south of I-20, to a point 2.5 miles (4.0 km) southeast as a replacement of a section of US 290, which was rerouted along I-10. RM 2189 was cancelled on July 31, 1974, due to low traffic counts.

== FM 2190 ==
Farm to Market Road 2190
- Location: Jack County
- Length: 13.105 mi (21.090 km)
- Existed: November 21, 1956–present

=== FM 2190 (1953) ===
Farm to Market Road 2190
- Location: Bailey County
- Existed: December 2, 1953–November 1, 1954

A previous route numbered FM 2190 was designated on December 2, 1953, from FM 1760, 7.5 miles (12.1 km) east of the TX/NM state line, north 2.7 miles (4.3 km) to the Palmer County line. Eleven months later FM 2190 was cancelled and transferred to FM 1731.

== FM 2191 ==
Farm to Market Road 2191
- Location: Brooks County
- Length: 12.338 mi (19.856 km)
- Existed: 1953–present

== FM 2192 ==
Farm to Market Road 2192
- Location: Lubbock and Lynn counties
- Length: 7.062 mi (11.365 km)
- Existed: 1953–present

Farm to Market Road 2192 (FM 2192) is located in Lubbock and Lynn counties in the South Plains region.

FM 2192 begins at an intersection with FM 211 near Wilson. The highway travels in a mostly northern direction, briefly running in a western direction at Lynn County Road 2. FM 2192 enters into Lubbock County just south of County Road 7900 (210th Street). The highway ends at an intersection with FM 41, with the roadway continuing north as County Road 2730 (which eventually becomes FM 3431).

FM 2192 was designated on December 2, 1953, running from FM 211 near Wilson to the Lubbock County line at a distance of 6.0 miles (9.7 km). The highway was extended 1.5 miles (2.4 km) to FM 41 on February 1, 1957.

== FM 2193 ==
Farm to Market Road 2193
- Location: Washington County
- Length: 2.722 mi (4.381 km)
- Existed: October 29, 1953–present

Farm to Market Road 2193 (FM 2193) is located in Washington County. It runs from SH 105 east to FM 1155.

FM 2193 was designated on October 29, 1953, from SH 90 (now SH 105), 8 miles (13 km) northeast of Brenham, east 3.0 miles (4.8 km) to a road intersection. On August 24, 1955, the road was extended south 5.0 miles (8.0 km) to US 290, replacing FM 2194. On December 19, 1956, an 8.2-mile (13.2 km) section from US 290 north to FM 1155 was transferred to FM 1155.

== FM 2194 ==
Farm to Market Road 2194
- Location: Collin and Hunt counties
- Length: 14.216 mi (22.878 km)
- Existed: 1955–present

=== FM 2194 (1953) ===
Farm to Market Road 2194
- Location: Washington County
- Existed: October 29, 1953–September 20, 1955

A previous route numbered FM 2194 was designated on October 29, 1953, from US 290 (now FM 1371) at Chappell Hill north 8.2 miles (13.2 km) to a road intersection. On August 24, 1954, the road was extended south 0.69 miles (1.11 km) over a former section of US 290 to new US 290. FM 2194 was cancelled on September 20, 1955, and transferred to FM 2193 (now FM 1155).

== FM 2195 ==
Farm to Market Road 2195
- Location: Cochran County
- Length: 5.518 mi (8.880 km)
- Existed: 1953–present

== FM 2196 ==
Farm to Market Road 2196
- Location: Terry and Yoakum counties
- Length: 29.206 mi (47.003 km)
- Existed: 1953–present

Farm to Market Road 2196 (FM 2196) is located in Terry and Yoakum counties in the South Plains region.

FM 2196 begins at an intersection with SH 214 north of Plains. The highway travels in an eastern direction through rural areas with farm and ranch land with oil pumps before ending at an intersection with US 385 north of Brownfield. FM 2196 serves as a relief route for US 82/US 380 between Plains and Brownfield, as the highway runs closely parallel to that highway between the two towns.

FM 2196 was designated on December 2, 1953, running from FM 402 northward and westward at a distance of 6.0 miles (9.7 km). The highway was extended 5.6 miles (9.0 km) westward to a road intersection on October 26, 1954. FM 2196 was rerouted; the section from FM 402 northward 2.2 miles (3.5 km) was transferred to the new FM 3262, and FM 2196 was rerouted to FM 1780 on October 26, 1975, replacing the old FM 3262. The highway was extended 12.0 miles (19.3 km) from FM 1780 to SH 214 on January 30, 1989.

Junction list

County	Location	mi	km	Destinations	Notes
Yoakum		0.0	0.0	SH 214 – Morton, Plains	
Yoakum		12.0	19.3	FM 1780 – Whiteface, Seagraves	
Terry		20.6	33.2	FM 3262 south	
Terry		23.5	37.8	FM 303	
Terry		29.2	47.0	US 385 – Levelland, Brownfield	
1.000 mi = 1.609 km; 1.000 km = 0.621 mi

== FM 2197 ==
Farm to Market Road 2197
- Location: Lamb County
- Length: 5.862 mi (9.434 km)
- Existed: 1953–present

== FM 2198 ==
Farm to Market Road 2198
- Location: Harrison County
- Length: 4.963 mi (7.987 km)
- Existed: 1953–present

Farm to Market Road 2198 (FM 2198) is located in Harrison County. The highway runs from SH 43/FM 134 near Karnack northeastward to Cypress Drive in Uncertain.

FM 2198 was designated in 1953, running from FM 134 near the entrance to Caddo Lake State Park northeastward to a road intersection. In 1962, the highway was extended westward to FM 1915 (now SH 43) along an old section of FM 134 when that highway was re-routed.

Junction list

The entire route is in Harrison County.

Location	mi	km	Destinations	Notes
	0.0	0.0	SH 43 / FM 134	
	0.5	0.80	PR 2 north – Caddo Lake State Park	
Uncertain	4.9	7.9	Cypress Drive	
1.000 mi = 1.609 km; 1.000 km = 0.621 mi

== FM 2199 ==
Farm to Market Road 2199
- Location: Harrison County
- Length: 6.487 mi (10.440 km)
- Existed: December 2, 1953–present

Farm to Market Road 2199 (FM 2199) is located in Harrison County. Its southern terminus is at FM 31 at Crossroads. The route runs north, crossing I-20 at exit 624 and intersecting US 80. FM 2199 enters Scottsville, crossing a Union Pacific railroad line before reaching its northern terminus at FM 1998. The roadway continues beyond this point as Harkins Lane.

FM 2199 was designated on December 2, 1953, from US 80 to FM 1998. It was extended south to FM 31 on August 24, 1955.

Junction list

The entire route is in Harrison County.

Location	mi	km	Destinations	Notes
	0.0	0.0	FM 31	
	3.3	5.3	I-20 – Dallas, Shreveport	I-20 exit 624
	4.8	7.7	US 80	
Scottsville	6.5	10.5	FM 1998	
1.000 mi = 1.609 km; 1.000 km = 0.621 mi
