= Farm to Market Road 1125 =

Road in Texas, United States

Farm to Market Road 1125

Route information
- Maintained by TxDOT
- Length: 15.136 mi (24.359 km)
- Existed: 1949–present

Major junctions
- South end: FM 2127 near Crafton
- US 287 in Bowie
- North end: US 81 in Bowie

Location
- Country: United States
- State: Texas
- Counties: Jack, Montague

Highway system
- Highways in Texas; Interstate; US; State; Former; Toll; Loops; Spurs; FM/RM; Park; Rec
← FM 1124	→ FM 1126

Farm to Market Road 1125 (FM 1125) is a farm to market road that connects the farming areas of northern Jack County and southern Montague County with Bowie, Texas.

== Route description ==
FM 1125 begins in far northeastern Jack County, at an intersection with FM 2127. The two-lane route travels to the northeast, entering Montague County, and crosses the dam along the south shore of Lake Amon G. Carter. East of the lake, the roadway turns to the north and travels through unincorporated Montague County before entering Bowie. FM 1125 has a junction with the US 287 freeway and continues into central Bowie as Rock Hill Road. It turns onto Decatur Street and then Mill Street before state maintenance ends at an intersection with US 81.

== History ==
FM 1125 was first designated in Jack County on January 27, 1949; its original designation was from SH 148 between Henrietta and Jacksboro eastward to the community of Postoak. The designation was extended 1.2 miles (1.9 km) eastward on December 17, 1952, and then to SH 59 south of Newport on October 24, 1953. The route was first extended 4.8 miles (7.7 km) into Montague County on October 31, 1958. The road was extended to the Montague County line on June 28, 1963; the continuation to US 81 in Bowie was established on July 25, 1963, replacing FM 2094. The section from the current western terminus at FM 2127 to SH 148 became a part of FM 2127 on August 16, 1968, bringing FM 1125 to its current routing.

== Major intersections ==
County	Location	mi	km	Destinations	Notes
Jack		0.0	0.0	FM 2127 – Crafton	Southern terminus
Montague		7.5	12.1	Bridge over Lake Amon G. Carter	
Montague	Bowie	13.8	22.2	US 287 – Henrietta, Decatur	
Montague	Bowie	15.1	24.3	US 81 – Ringgold, Decatur	Northern terminus
1.000 mi = 1.609 km; 1.000 km = 0.621 mi
