= Roundup, Texas =

Unincorporated community in the United States

- Unincorporated community
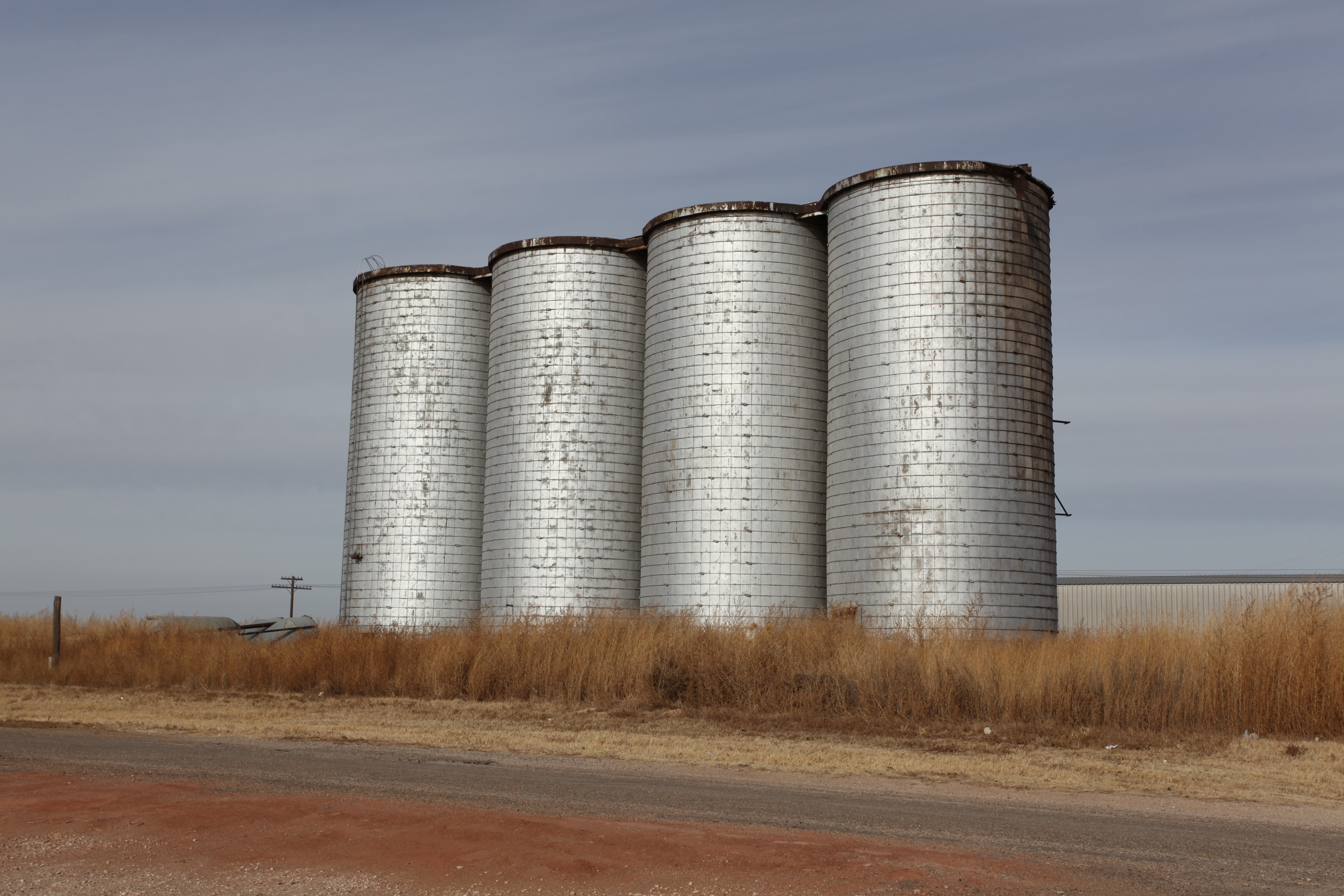
- Grain silos along the tracks in Roundup

- Location within Texas Location within the United States
- Coordinates: 33°45′44″N 102°05′50″W
- Country: United States
- State: Texas
- County: Hockley
- Region: Llano Estacado
- Established: 1912
- Elevation: 3,369 ft (1,027 m)

Population (2000)
  - Total: 20
- Time zone: UTC-6 (CST)
- ZIP: 79336
- Area code: 806

Roundup is an unincorporated community located in northeastern Hockley County, Texas, United States. The town is located on the high plains of the Llano Estacado at the intersection of U.S. Route 84 and Farm to Market Road 2130 between Anton and Shallowater.

== History ==
Roundup was established in 1912 and was originally located on the second Spade Ranch. The town was developed as a stop on the Santa Fe Railroad and shipped cattle, cotton, and grain for the ranch. The town's population peaked at 50 in 1948 then declined to 27 in 1980 and today the population is estimated to be around 20.

== Education ==
The town is served by the Anton Independent School District.

== See also ==
- U.S. Route 84
- BNSF Railway
- Yellow House Draw
- Blackwater Draw
- Caprock Escarpment
- Earth, Texas
