= Ruth Carter Stevenson =

American art collector (1923–2013)

- Born: October 19, 1923; Fort Worth, Texas, US
- Died: January 6, 2013 (aged 89); Fort Worth, Texas, US
- Occupation: Art collector
- Known for: Amon Carter Museum of American Art

Ruth Carter Stevenson (October 19, 1923 – January 6, 2013) was an American art collector. She was the founder of the Amon Carter Museum of American Art.

== Biography ==
Stevenson was born on October 19, 1923, in Fort Worth, Texas, to publisher Amon G. Carter and Nenetta Carter. She was the second daughter of Carter, the creator and publisher of the Fort Worth Star-Telegram, and her brother was publisher Amon G. Carter Jr. She graduated from the Madeira School and then earned a chemistry degree from Sarah Lawrence College in Yonkers, New York in 1945.

Her father specified in his will that a museum specializing in Western American art to be created after his death in 1955, to house his more than 700 art objects depicting the American West, primarily paintings and sculptures by Frederic Remington and Charles Russell. Stevenson hired architect Philip Johnson to design the building and opened the Amon Carter Museum of Western Art in January 1961, following her father's wishes. She was the first president of the museum's board of trustees and was president at her death in 2013.

Stevenson was also the first woman to be appointed to the board of directors of the National Gallery of Art in Washington, D.C., and the first woman to become the chairman of that board. Along with local art enthusiasts Owen Day and Sam Cantey III, Stephenson assembled An Art Exhibition for the President and Mrs. John F. Kennedy on November 21, 1963, which decorated the suite in the Hotel Texas in Fort Worth, occupied by President John F. Kennedy and Jacqueline Kennedy Onassis on the night before his assassination on November 22.

Ruth Carter Stevenson died at her home in Fort Worth, on January 6, 2013, aged 89.
