= Amon G. Carter Jr. =

American publisher, investor and heir (1919–1982)

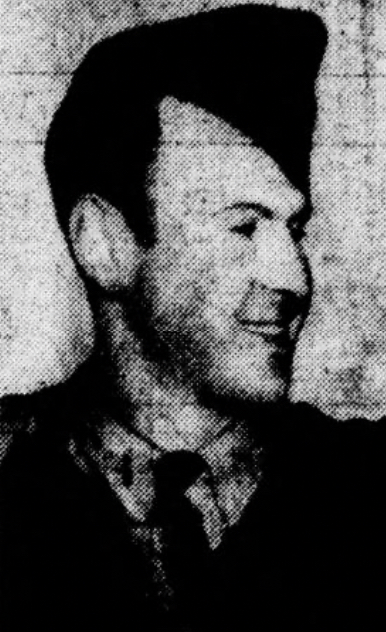
- Carter in a 1945 publication of The Washington Star
- Born: December 23, 1919; Fort Worth, Texas, US
- Died: July 24, 1982 (aged 62); Stemmons Corridor, Dallas, Texas, US
- Occupations: Publisher, investor, heir
- Children: 3
- Father: Amon G. Carter
- Family: Ruth Carter Stevenson (sister)

Amon Gary Carter Jr. (December 23, 1919 – July 24, 1982) was an American publisher, investor and heir. The son of publisher Amon G. Carter, he managed his father's Fort Worth Star-Telegram following his death, as well as being an executive in American Airlines and a board member of several businesses.

== Early life and military career ==
Carter was born on December 23, 1919, in Fort Worth, Texas, to publisher Amon G. Carter and his wife Nenetta (née Burton). His sister was art collector Ruth Carter Stevenson. By age 10, he worked as a newspaper seller for his father's Fort Worth Star-Telegram. As a teenager, he worked as a copy boy and photographer.

In 1938, Carter graduated from the Culver Military Academy and enlisted into the United States Army. During World War II, he fought in the North African campaign as a lieutenant artillery officer of the 1st Armored Division, during which he was taken by German soldiers near Sbeitla, and held in Oflag 64 until 1945. While imprisoned, he published an illicit newspaper and created a mail line to circumvent the prison's official one. He also collected stamps while there, which he began after creating his mail line. Following the war, Carter returned to the United States, and in June 1946, he graduated from the University of Texas System with a degree in business.

== Career ==
He continued working for the Star-Telegram, becoming its treasurer in 1952. When his father died in 1955, he succeeded him as president of the newspaper, which he was until his death. In 1974, he agreed to the joint sale of the newspaper to Capital Cities/ABC and LIN Media, a deal worth $155 million. In 1979, he was appointed chairman of its board of directors.

Besides the Star-Telegram, Carter was president of the Amon G. Carter Foundation, a charity. He was a director in American Airlines—which his father was a founder of—and played a role in their headquarters' move to Fort Worth. He also influenced the Texas Rangers' move, which Carter was the second-largest shareholder of. He served as a board member of Texas Christian University, the Amon Carter Museum of American Art, the Fort Worth Stock Show & Rodeo, the Texas Sports Hall of Fame, and the West Texas Chamber of Commerce.

== Personal life and death ==
A coin collector, Carter was a founding member of the International Paper Money Society, and served on the United States Assay Commission. He was also a member of the United Methodist Church. Politically, he was an Independent Democrat. He was a recipient of the B'nai B'rith Gold Medallion and the Silver Beaver Award. He married George Ann Carter (née Brown) and had three children with her. He died on July 24, 1982, aged 62, of a heart attack while driving on the Stemmons Corridor in Dallas. He was brought to Parkland Memorial Hospital, where he died. In 1982, the Amon G. Carter Jr. Exhibits Hall, a venue, was named for him.
