= Carter Peak (Texas) =

Mountain in Texas, United States

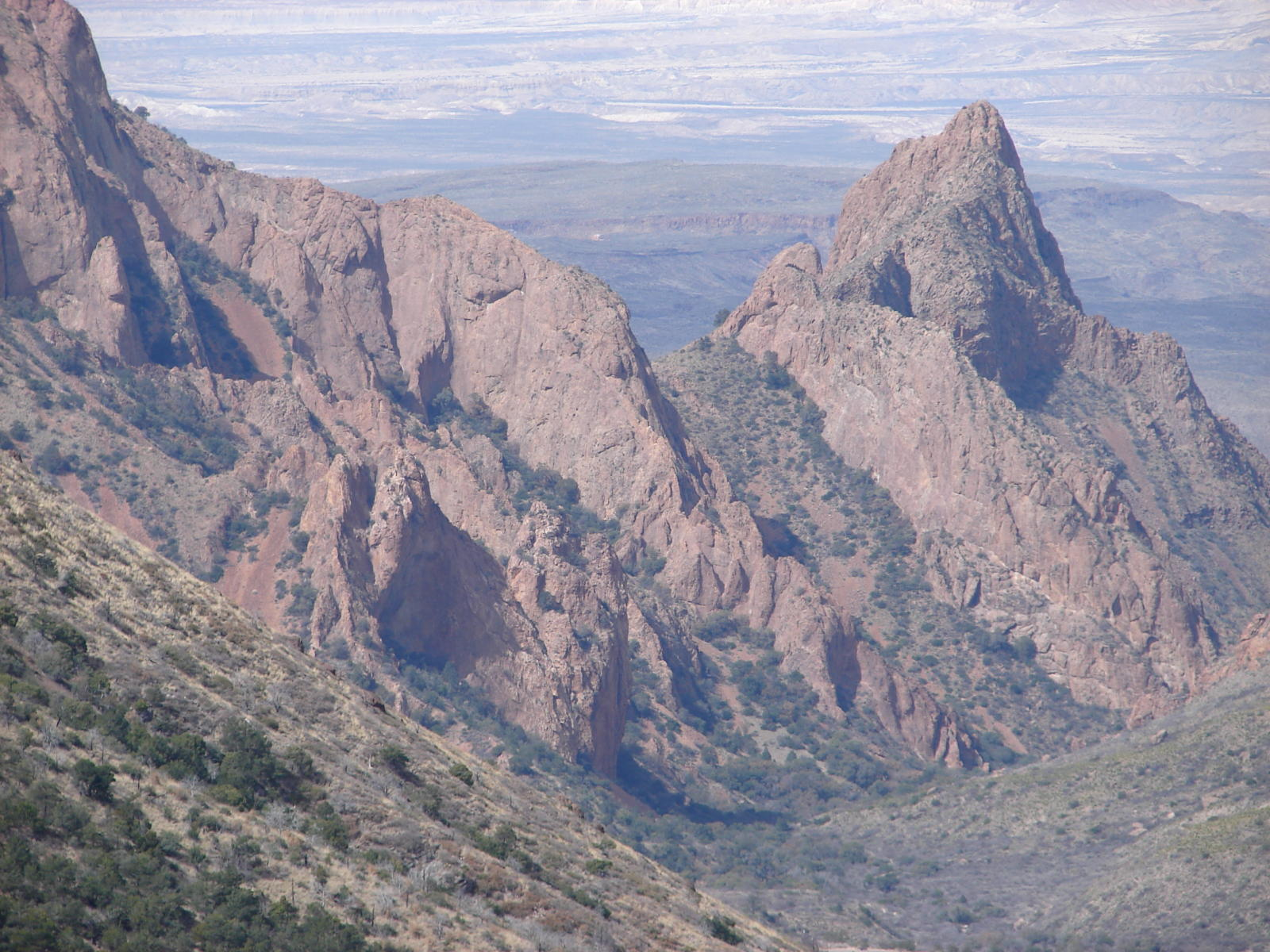
- East aspect

Highest point
- Elevation: 5,690 ft (1,734 m)
- Prominence: 437 ft (133 m)
- Parent peak: Vernon Bailey Peak (6,672 ft)
- Isolation: 0.79 mi (1.27 km)
- Coordinates: 29°16′38″N 103°19′54″W

Naming
- Etymology: Amon G. Carter

Geography
- Location within Texas Location within the United States
- Country: United States
- State: Texas
- County: Brewster
- Protected area: Big Bend National Park
- Parent range: Chisos Mountains
- Topo map: USGS The Basin

Geology
- Rock age: Oligocene
- Rock type: Intrusive rock

Climbing
- Easiest route: class 3

Carter Peak is a 5,690-foot-elevation (1,734-meter) summit in Brewster County, Texas, United States.

== Description ==
Carter Peak is located on the west side of the Chisos Mountains in Big Bend National Park. The mountain is composed of intrusive rock which formed during the Oligocene period. Topographic relief is significant as the summit rises 1,500 feet (457 m) above Oak Canyon in one-quarter mile (0.4 km). The nearest higher neighbor is Vernon Bailey Peak, 0.78 miles (1.26 km) to the northeast. Based on the Köppen climate classification, Carter Peak is located in a hot arid climate zone with hot summers and mild winters. Any scant precipitation runoff from the peak's slopes drains south to Cottonwood Creek and north into Oak Creek which are both part of the Rio Grande watershed. The lower slopes of the mountain are covered by juniper, oak, and piñon. The mountain's toponym was officially adopted in 1957 by the United States Board on Geographic Names to honor Amon G. Carter (1879–1955), publisher of the Fort Worth Star-Telegram, and promoter of the establishment of Big Bend National Park.

== See also ==
- List of mountain peaks of Texas
- Geography of Texas

== Gallery ==
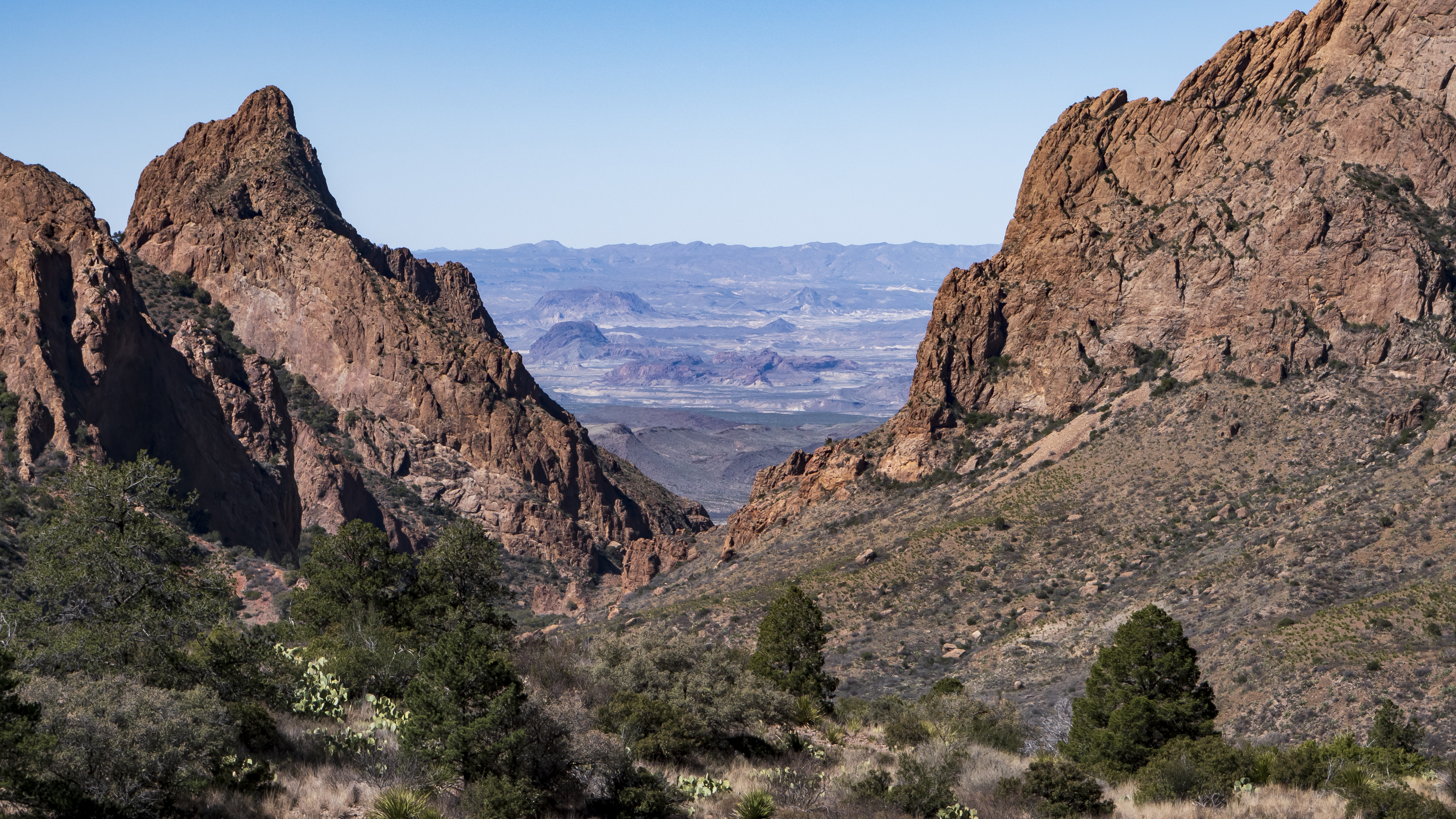
"The Window" with Carter Peak to the left

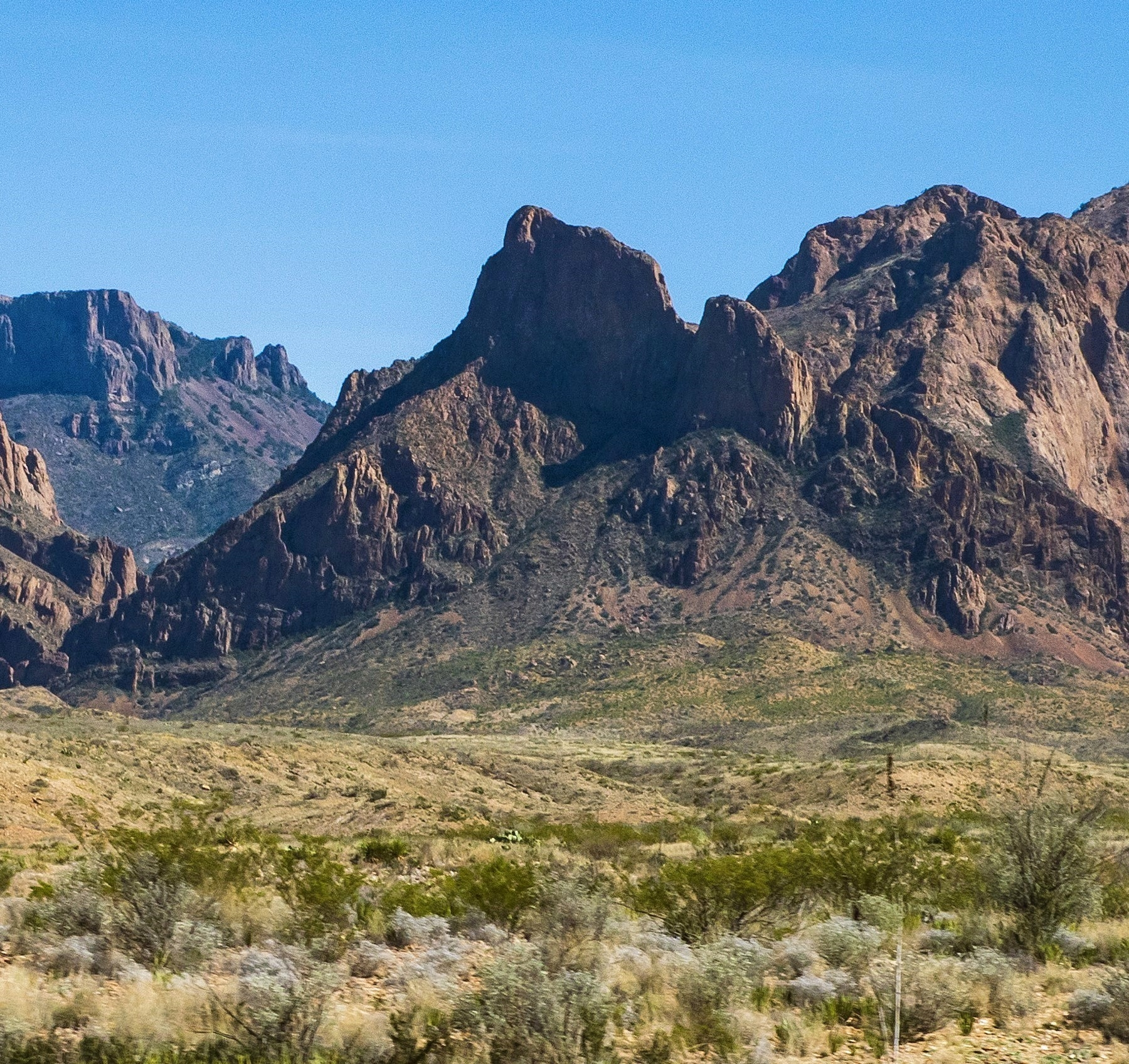
West aspect

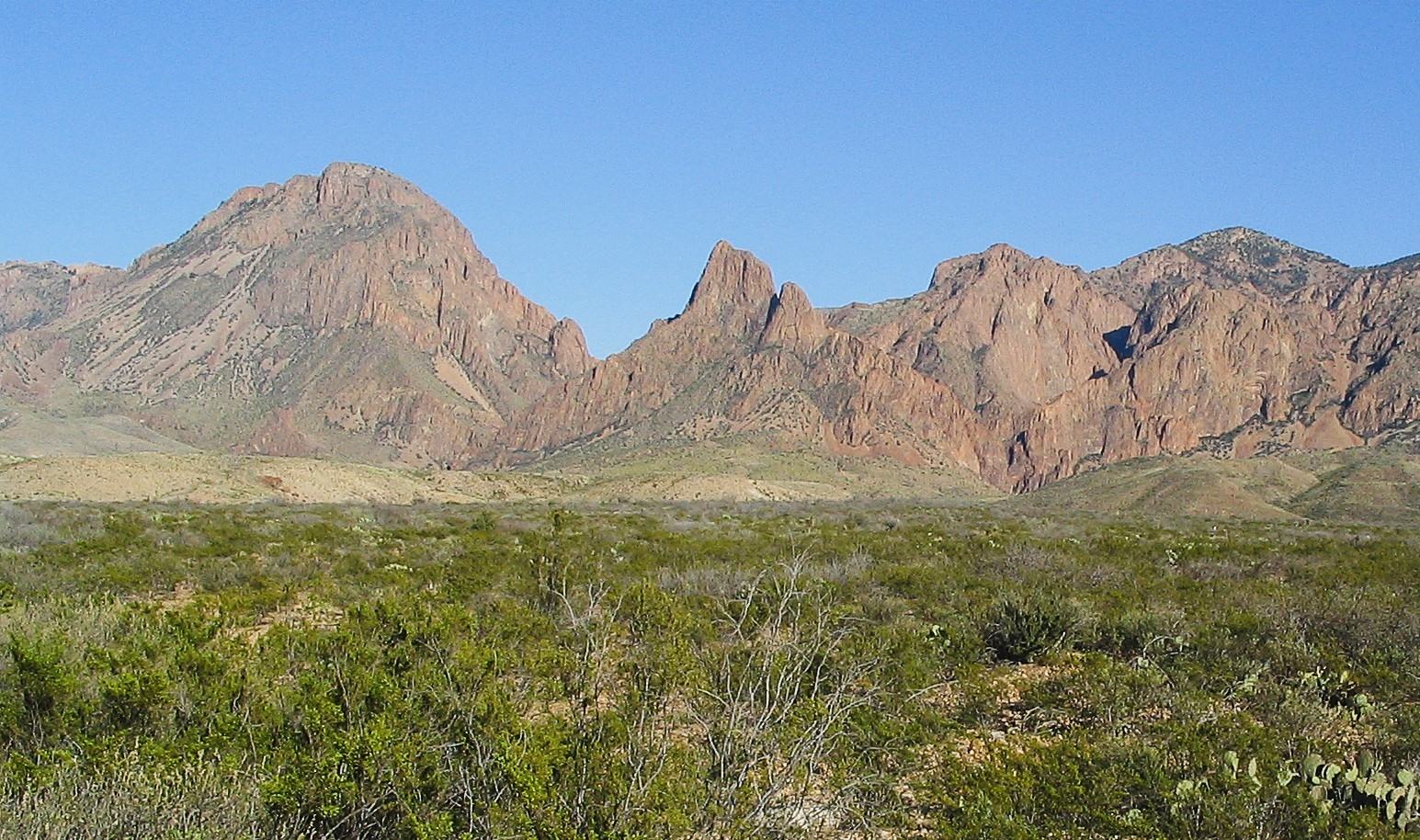
Carter Peak (centered) viewed from west. Vernon Bailey Peak (left).

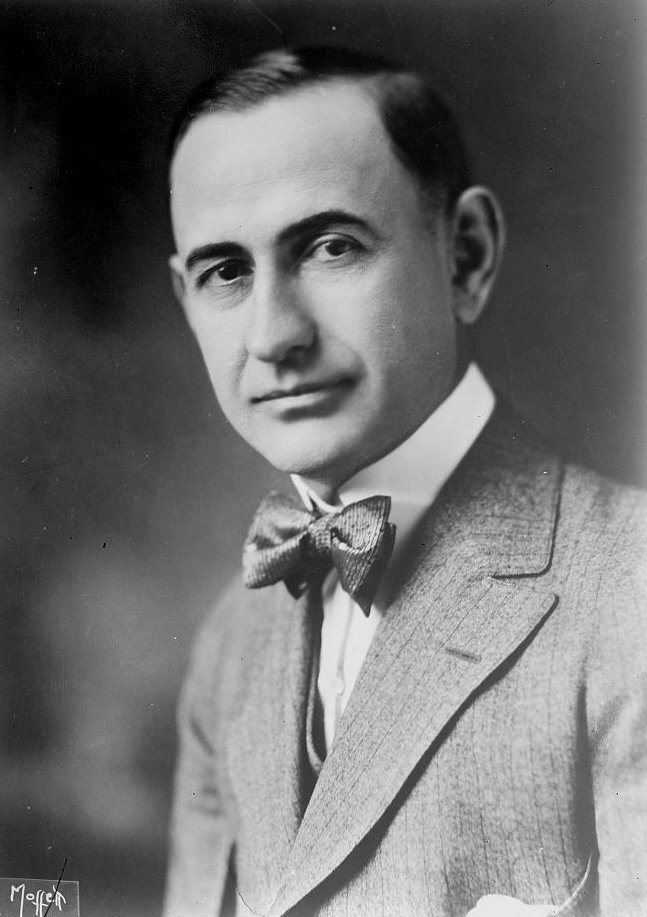
Amon G. Carter
