= Anton High School =

Location
- 100 Ellwood Blvd. Anton, Texas 79313-0309; United States

Information
- School type: Public high school
- School district: Anton Independent School District
- Principal: Dwight Rice
- Staff: 18.36 (FTE)
- Grades: PK-12
- Enrollment: 170 (2023–2024)
- Student to teacher ratio: 9.26
- Colors: Purple & Gold
- Athletics conference: UIL Class A
- Mascot: Bulldog
- Website: Anton High School

Anton High School is a public secondary school located in the city of Anton, Texas, USA and classified as a 1A school by the UIL. It is a part of the Anton Independent School District located in southwestern Hockley County. In 2015, the school was rated "Met Standard" by the Texas Education Agency.

== Academics ==
- UIL Literary Criticism Champions -
  - 1993(1A)

== Athletics ==
The Anton Bulldogs compete in these sports -

Cross Country, 6-Man Football, Basketball, Powerlifting, Tennis & Track

=== State titles ===
- Boys Golf -
  - 1971(B)
