= Amon G. Carter =

American publisher and art collector (1879–1955)

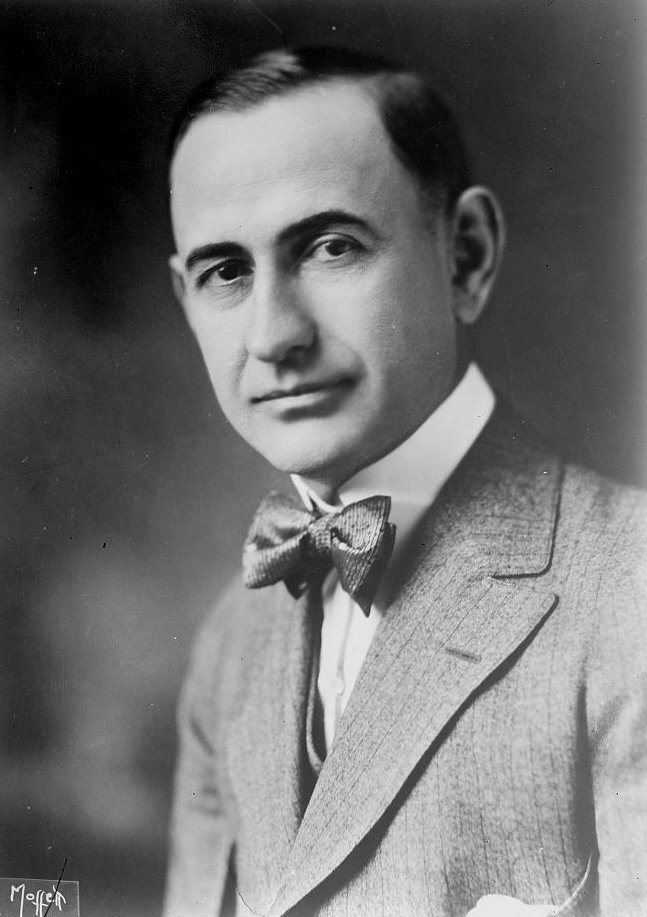
- Born: Giles Amon Carter; December 11, 1879; Crafton, Texas, U.S.
- Died: June 23, 1955 (aged 75); Fort Worth, Texas, U.S.
- Resting place: Greenwood Memorial Cemetery
- Education: Texas Tech University
- Occupation: Publisher

Amon Giles Carter Sr. (born Giles Amon Carter; December 11, 1879 – June 23, 1955) was an American newspaperman. He was the creator and publisher of the Fort Worth Star-Telegram, as well as a civic booster for Fort Worth, Texas. He is the namesake of the Amon Carter Museum of American Art, which was founded by his daughter, Ruth Carter Stevenson, in January 1961.

== Biography ==
Carter was born on December 11, 1879, in Crafton, Texas. After his mother died in 1892, he moved away from his remaining family, to Bowie, Texas, where he supported himself with a variety of odd jobs. At those jobs, he learned salesmanship, and became a travelling salesman as a young man. Bowie residents have recalled that he was one of the original "chicken & bread boys" who sold sandwiches represented as "chicken" to passengers at the rail station during the depression. The sandwiches, it was thought, were really made of rabbits that the boys had hunted. To this day Bowie has an annual Chicken & Bread Festival each October.

=== Publisher ===
In May 1905, Carter accepted a job as an advertising space salesman in Fort Worth. A few months later, he agreed to help finance and run a new newspaper in town. The Fort Worth Star printed its first newspaper on February 1, 1906, with Carter as the advertising manager. The Star lost money, and was in danger of going bankrupt when Carter had an audacious idea: raise additional money and purchase his newspaper's main competition, the Fort Worth Telegram. In November 1908, the Star purchased the Telegram for $100,000, and the two newspapers combined on January 1, 1909, into the Fort Worth Star-Telegram.

From 1923 until after World War II, the Star-Telegram had the largest circulation of any newspaper in the South, serving not just Fort Worth but also West Texas, New Mexico, and western Oklahoma. The newspaper created WBAP, the oldest radio station in Fort Worth, in 1922; and followed it with Texas' first television station, WBAP-TV, in 1948.

=== Civic booster ===
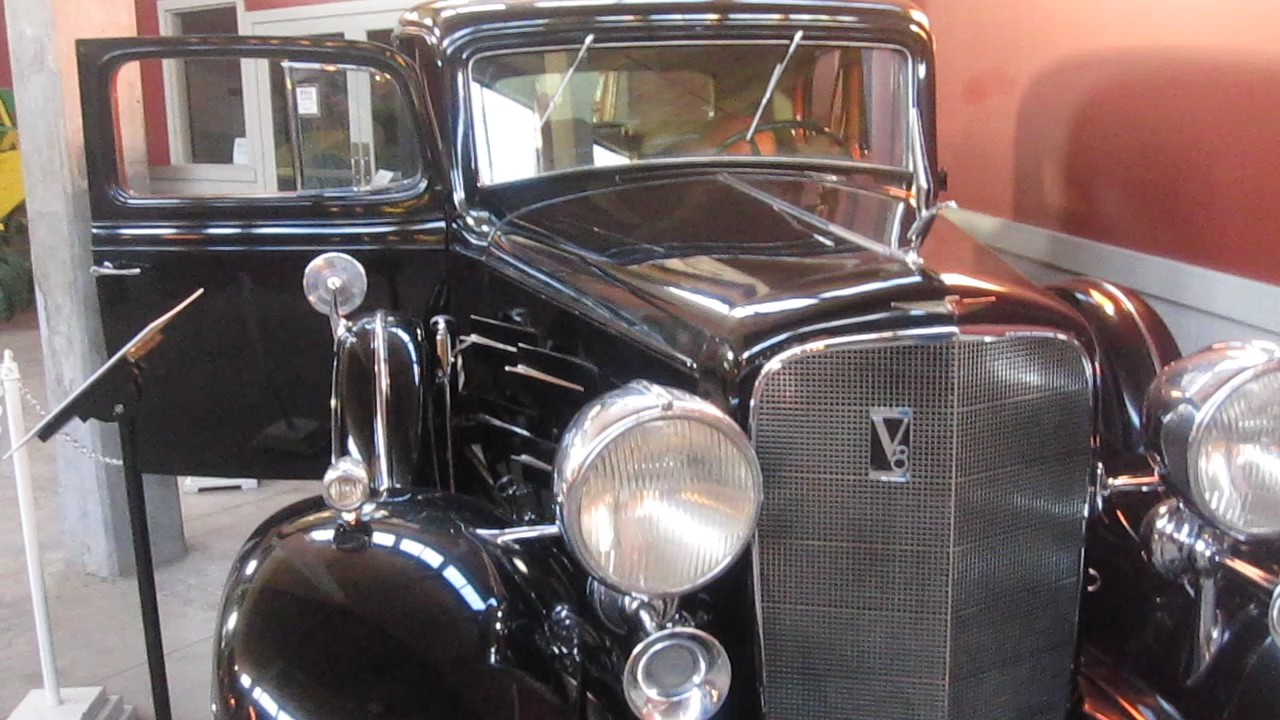
This Cadillac owned by Amon G. Carter, Sr., is displayed at the Texas Cowboy Hall of Fame in Fort Worth, Texas.

Carter parlayed this money and power into celebrity as a national spokesman for Fort Worth and West Texas (Carter popularized the description of Fort Worth as "Where the West Begins", a phrase which still appears daily on the Star-Telegram's front page, and Fort Worth Police Department vehicles). During the 1920s and 1930s, Carter personified the image of the Texas cowboy in the national mind: an uninhibited story-teller, gambler, and drinker, generous with his money and quick to draw his six-shooters. Major magazines such as Time and the Saturday Evening Post ran profiles of Carter, and he counted Will Rogers and Walter Winchell among his friends. The well-publicized hospitality of his Shady Oak Farm near Lake Worth was open to any major celebrity or businessman passing through Fort Worth. In 1961, National Geographic said that Carter had done "more than any other one person to build the city into its present image".

Carter used his national stage to drum up business and government spending for his home region. From the Texas state legislature, he got a four-year college (now Texas Tech University) for Lubbock, where he was first chairman of the Board of Directors. He persuaded Southern Air Transport (now American Airlines) to move its headquarters from Dallas to nearby Fort Worth. Several oil companies moved or kept their headquarters in Fort Worth after personal interventions by Carter. In addition Carter was influential in obtaining for Fort Worth the construction of Air Force Plant 4 (now the headquarters of Lockheed Martin Aeronautics) and the relocation of Bell Aircraft (now Bell Helicopter Textron).

Carter's disdain for Dallas, Fort Worth's much larger and much richer neighbor, was legendary in Texas. One of the best-known stories about Carter is that he would take a sack lunch whenever he traveled to Dallas so he wouldn't have to spend any money there. He was also quoted as saying "Fort Worth is where the West begins...and Dallas is where the East peters out." On his orders, the Star-Telegram television station, WBAP-TV, avoided mentions of Dallas or of even being part of a merged Dallas–Fort Worth television market on his orders even when it was clear the two cities would be a single market. Carter's heirs maintained this line until NBC pressured them to relent several years after Carter's death, along with a move of its transmitter to Cedar Hill to cover both cities equally.

After World War II, Carter stopped barnstorming on behalf of Fort Worth. In January 1951, Carter received a donation from the Texas and Pacific Railway—steam locomotive No. 610—and he put it on static display near the Will Rogers Memorial Coliseum on behalf of the Southwestern Exposition and Fat Stock Show. In 1953, he suffered the first of several heart attacks; the final one, two years later, was fatal. On June 23, 1955, Carter died in Fort Worth, Texas. He was buried in Greenwood Memorial Cemetery in Fort Worth.

== Legacy ==
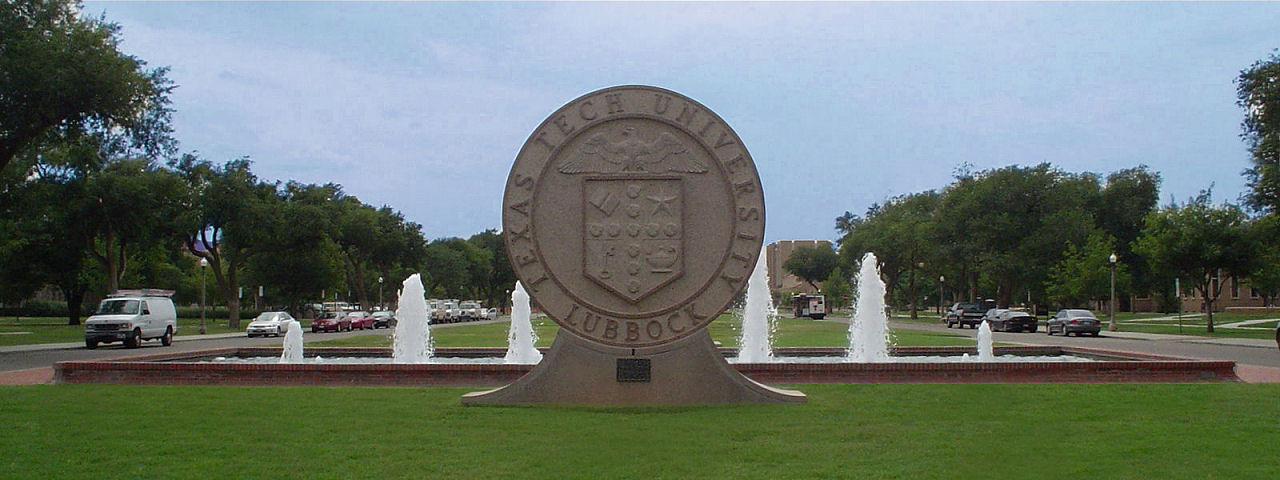
Amon G. Carter Plaza, the main entry to Texas Tech University

- Texas Christian University in Fort Worth named its football stadium Amon G. Carter Stadium to recognize Carter's contributions to the college.
- The main entrance of the Texas Tech University campus in Lubbock, Texas, is named Amon G. Carter Plaza. The plaza includes a sculpture of the university's seal, set against a backdrop of a seven-jet fountain and an equestrian statue, entitled Riding into the Sunset.
- Fort Worth's former commercial airport (whose remains may be seen just north of 183 before you enter Dallas/Fort Worth International Airport and the current location of the American Airlines corporate headquarters), bore his name as Amon G. Carter Airfield. The airport was later changed to Greater Southwest International Airport before operations moved to DFW in 1974.
- Following the airport's demolition, in 1979, its main runway was converted to a city street and named Amon Carter Boulevard. By coincidence, KXAS-TV and Telemundo station KXTX-TV moved to new studio facilities along that street in 2013, and a conference room in the facility was named for Carter.
- Carter BloodCare, one of the largest blood banks in the country, is named after Carter after he provided grant money to help charter the nonprofit in 1959.
- Carter Peak in Big Bend National Park is named in honor of Carter's contributions to the establishment of the park.
- The main auditorium at Texas A&M School of Law is named after Amon Carter. It was a gift of the Amon G. Carter Foundation.
- The Southern Air Transport terminal at Fort Worth Meacham International Airport, now Atlantic Aviation, was dedicated to Amon Carter in 1933.
- The Fort Worth ISD's Amon Carter Riverside High School honors Carter.
- YMCA Camp Carter (YMCA of Metropolitan Fort Worth) located in Fort Worth.
- Amon G. Carter Lake in Bowie, Texas is also named after Mr. Carter.
- Locomotive No. 610 was later removed from display at the Will Rogers Coliseum and restored for use in pulling the American Freedom Train with financial assistance from Carter's son, Amon G. Carter Jr.. Since 1986, No. 610 has remained on display at the Texas State Railroad in Palestine.
