= Anton Independent School District =

School district in Texas

Location
- 100 Ellwood Blvd. Anton, Texas ESC Region 17 USA
- Coordinates: 33°48′55″N 102°9′48″W

District information
- Type: Independent school district
- Grades: Pre-K through 12
- Superintendent: Jim Knight
- Schools: 1 (2009-10)
- NCES District ID: 4808230

Students and staff
- Students: 245 (2010-11)
- Teachers: 29.89 (2009-10) (on full-time equivalent (FTE) basis)
- Student–teacher ratio: 9.07 (2009-10)
- Athletic conference: UIL Class 1A 6-man Football Division I
- District mascot: Bulldogs
- Colors: Purple, Gold

Other information
- TEA District Accountability Rating for 2011: Academically Acceptable
- Website: Anton ISD

Anton Independent School District is a public school district based in Anton, Texas (USA). The district operates one high school, Anton High School.

== Finances ==
As of the 2010–2011 school year, the appraised valuation of property in the district was $120,850,000. The maintenance tax rate was $0.104 and the bond tax rate was $0.000 per $100 of appraised valuation.

== Academic achievement ==
In 2011, the school district was rated "academically acceptable" by the Texas Education Agency. Forty-nine percent of districts in Texas in 2011 received the same rating. No state accountability ratings will be given to districts in 2012. A school district in Texas can receive one of four possible rankings from the Texas Education Agency: Exemplary (the highest possible ranking), Recognized, Academically Acceptable, and Academically Unacceptable (the lowest possible ranking).

Historical district TEA accountability ratings

- 2011: Academically Acceptable
- 2010: Recognized
- 2009: Academically Acceptable
- 2008: Academically Acceptable
- 2007: Recognized
- 2006: Academically Acceptable
- 2005: Academically Acceptable
- 2004: Academically Acceptable

== See also ==
- List of school districts in Texas
- List of high schools in Texas
