= Crafton, Texas =

Community in northwestern Wise County, Texas, United States

Coordinates: 33°22′09″N 97°54′21″W

Crafton is a community in northwestern Wise County, Texas, United States. Initially laid out in the 1870s or 1880s by George Craft, the town's namesake, Crafton reached a population of 250 in 1885 and had several businesses, churches, and a school. It struggled economically after the turn of the 19th century, when railroads bypassed the town, and its population declined to an estimated twenty in 2000.

== Location ==
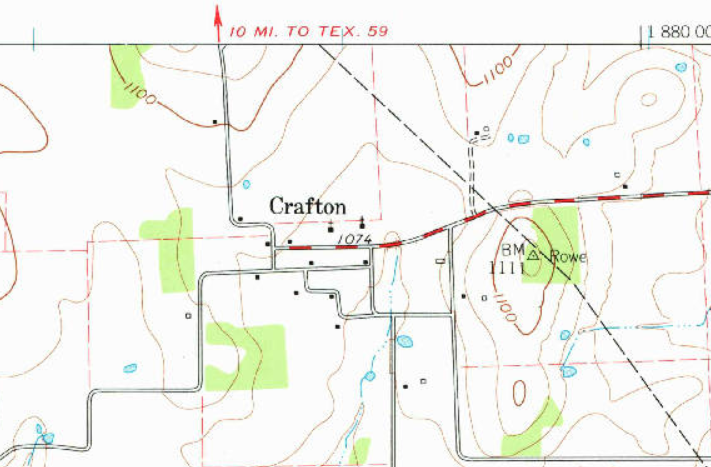
The Crafton area, as presented in a 1961 USGS topographic map

Crafton is located in northwestern Wise County, Texas, off Farm to Market Road 2127. The town is located at the headwaters of Indian River. It is 18 miles (29 km) to the northwest of the city of Decatur, and approximately 2 miles (3.2 km) east of Wise County's border with Jack County. Additionally, it is 2 miles (3.2 km) east of the Old Spanish Trail, a historic trading route, and 1 mile (1.6 km) north of the nearby Butterfield Overland Mail route.

== History ==
Crafton is named after George Craft, a farmer, politician, and surveyor. Craft moved to Wise County, Texas, in the second half of the 19th century with his wife, Emily. There they laid out what would become Crafton in the 1870s or 1880s. (Note: Sources conflict over the date that Crafton was laid out: an 1885 profile of George Craft gives the date as 1878, while the book Texas Place Names dates it to 1883, and a newspaper profile on the town states that it was surveyed in March 1883.) Craft laid claim to a plot of 160 acres (65 ha) in 1877, and the governor of Texas granted him a patent on April 12, 1880. He gradually sold lots from his land to be built into the town. Craft later represented the town in the Texas House of Representatives, from 1885 to 1887. The town served as a place for local farmers to sell their crops.

Historian Jerry Flemmons described Crafton in the 1870s as "a wart-like collection of mismatched sod and log houses mounted on hump-backed hills." By 1885, Crafton had a population of 250. In the 1880s and 90s it was the site of at least seven businesses, a steam mill, three churches, a hotel, and a cotton gin. The town had a school that could hold 250 students. By 1890, the town's population was around 200.

The town flooded on September 9, 1900. A tornado hit the town in late March 1909, destroying all buildings holding businesses but one, as well as the town's Methodist and Baptist churches. A later profile described the buildings that were destroyed as "four churches, one gin, two blacksmith shops, two drug stores, one school, 3 other businesses, and seven residences." The town was rebuilt but struggled after railways were built that did not go through the town at the end of the 19th century, and as the region grew less cotton.

The town's post office closed in 1917, and its population was estimated at 168 in the mid-1920s. Crafton's population had further declined to fifty by 1950 and reached twenty in 1986. The community's population was still twenty in 2000.

== Notable person ==
Amon G. Carter, publisher and promoter of Fort Worth, Texas, was born in a log cabin just outside of Crafton. Carter lived there for just a few years but thought positively of his time there, and after visiting in the 1930s, he attempted to purchase the Presbyterian church's bell, as his mother had attended the church. He was unsuccessful in this effort but instead got the Baptist Church's bell. In his later years, Carter donated funds for an all-faith tabernacle in Crafton.

== Bibliography ==
- Callary, Edward (June 2, 2020). Texas Place Names. University of Texas Press. ISBN 978-1-4773-2064-8.
- Cervantez, Brian A. (2019). Amon Carter: A Lone Star Life. University of Oklahoma Press. ISBN 978-0-8061-6329-1.
- Flemmons, Jerry (1978). Amon: The Life of Amon Carter, Sr., of Texas. Jenkins Publishing. ISBN 0836301552.
- Flemmons, Jerry (1998). Amon: The Texan Who Played Cowboy for America. Texas Tech University Press. ISBN 978-0-89672-564-5.
- Loughery, E. H. (1885). Personnel of the Texas State Government For 1885 (PDF). J. M. Snyder.
