= Anton, Texas =

- City
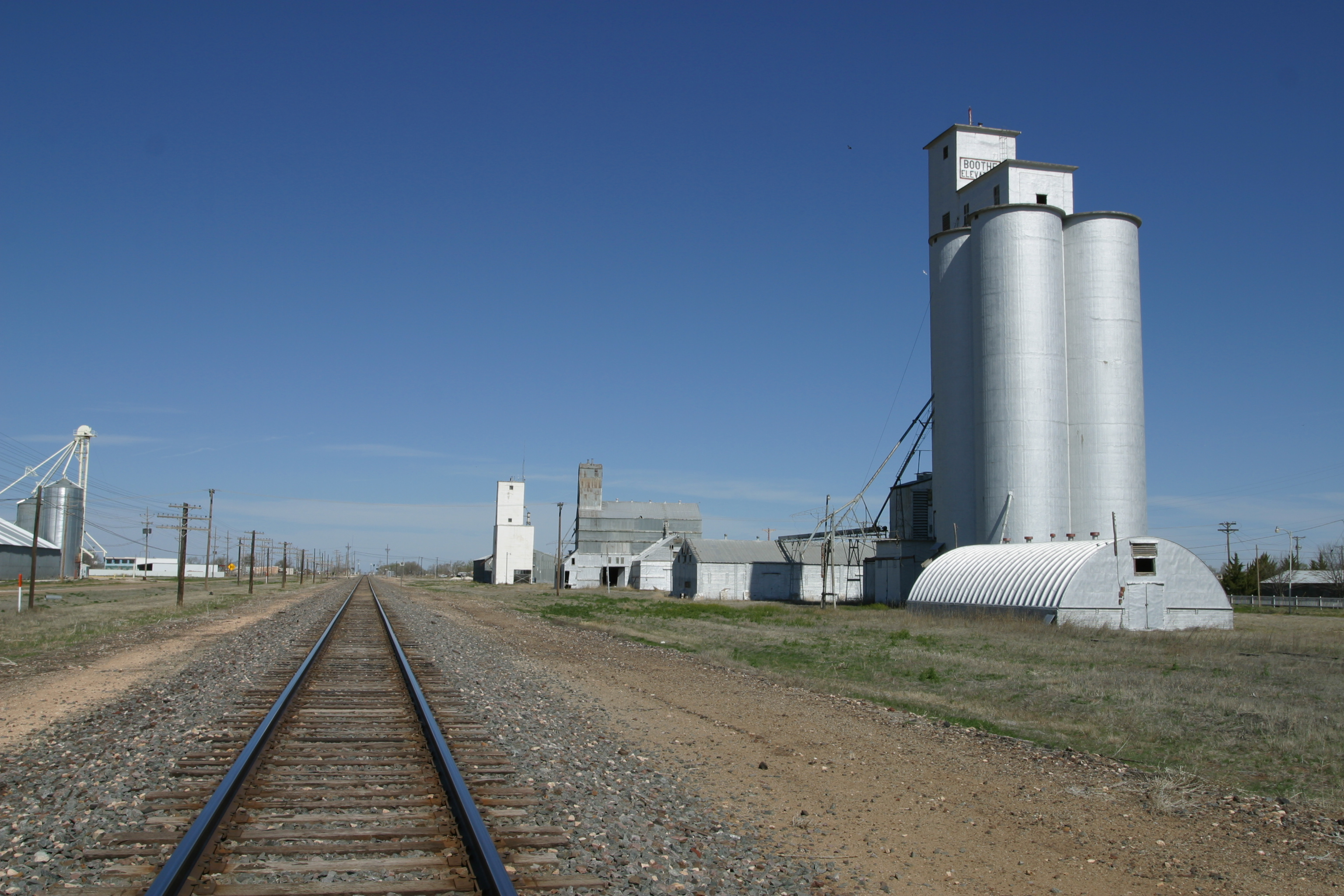
- Boothe Elevators and BNSF Railway in Anton
- Interactive map of Anton, Texas
- Location within Texas
- Coordinates: 33°48′40″N 102°09′50″W
- Country: United States
- State: Texas
- County: Hockley
- Region: Llano Estacado
- Established: 1924

Area
  - Total: 0.78 sq mi (2.02 km^{2})
  - Land: 0.78 sq mi (2.02 km^{2})
  - Water: 0 sq mi (0.00 km^{2})
- Elevation: 3,389 ft (1,033 m)

Population (2020)
  - Total: 907
  - Density: 1,160/sq mi (449/km^{2})
- Time zone: UTC-6 (CST)
- ZIP code: 79313
- Area code: 806
- FIPS code: 48-03540
- GNIS feature ID: 1351209

Anton (/ˈæntən/ ANT-ən) is a city in Hockley County, Texas, United States. The population was 907 at the 2020 census.

== History ==
Anton was founded in 1924 near the center of the north pasture of the former Spade Ranch when ranch owner William Leonard Ellwood contracted with the Anton Townsite Company to plat a town at the site of Danforth Switch, a spur of the Pecos and Northern Texas Railway. The town was named in honor of J.F. Anton, a Santa Fe railroad executive.

Anton's first mayor was Paul Grover Whitfield, who was born in July 1908, so in 1924 was only 16 or 17 years old. He told everyone he was 18, so was able to accept the position. He is, therefore, on record as being the youngest mayor ever in Texas at the time, and since he was under 18, the record stands to this day and likely will for all time. Whether an election was held or if he simply volunteered for the position is unclear. In those days, identification was not required because most agreements were done with a handshake.

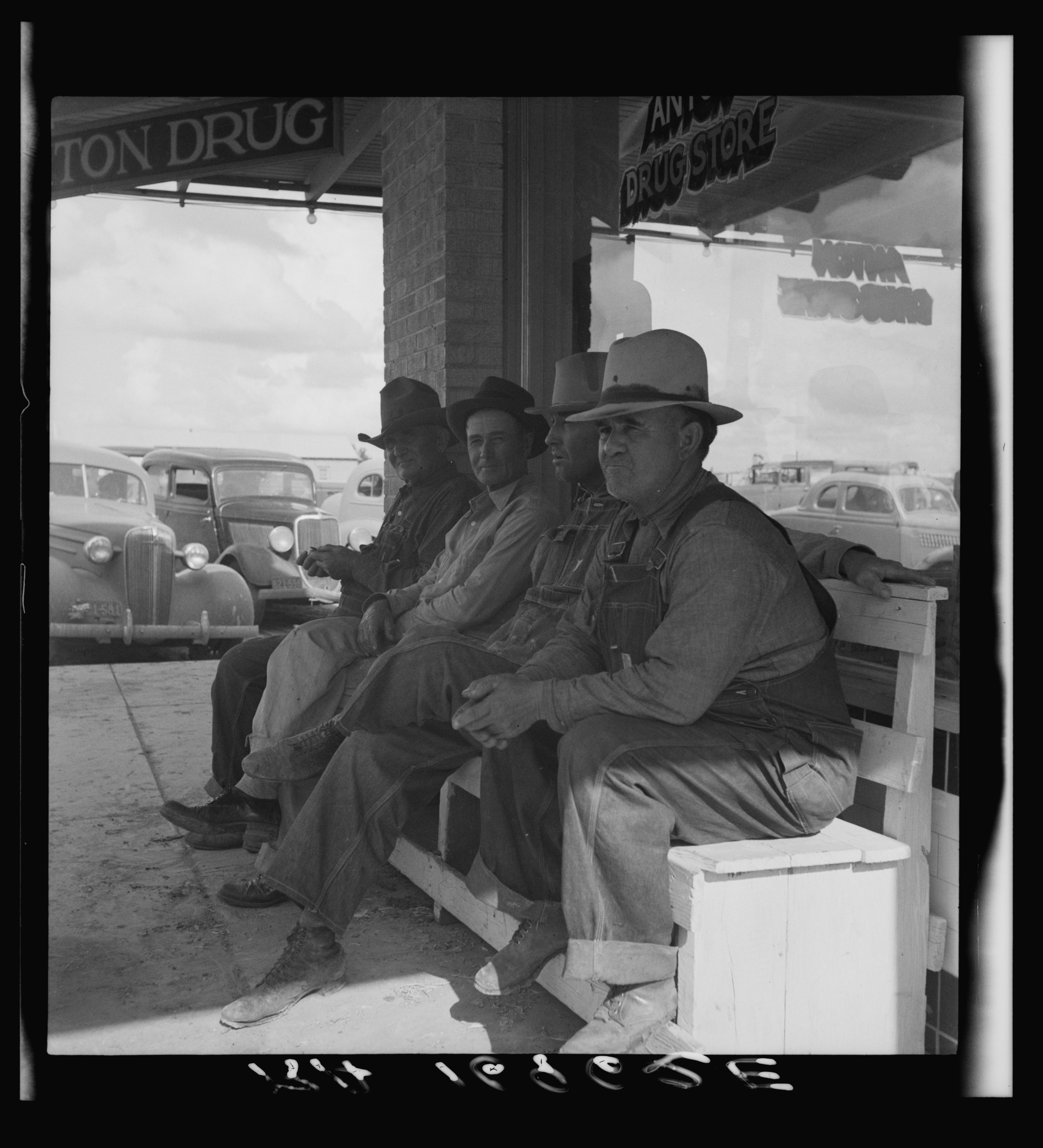
Famerers in Anton during the Dust Bowl

In the 1930s, Anton was impacted by the Dust Bowl.

== Geography ==
Anton sits just to the east of the geographic center of the level High Plains of the Llano Estacado. The flat terrain is broken to the west by a dry watercourse called Yellow House Draw, which passes about 0.5 miles (1 km) to the southwest of Anton.

Anton is well situated with regard to transportation. It is located at the intersection of U.S. Route 84 and Farm to Market Roads 168 and 597. US 84 leads southeast 25 miles (40 km) to Lubbock and northwest 12 miles (19 km) to Littlefield. The Burlington Northern Santa Fe Railway passes through the western edge of town.

According to the United States Census Bureau, the city has a total area of 0.77 square miles (2.0 km^{2}), all land.

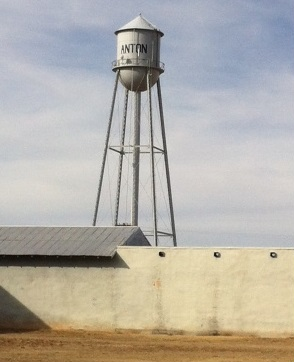
Anton water tower

== Demographics ==
Historical population
Census	Pop.	Note	%±
1940	548		—
1950	934		70.4%
1960	1,068		14.3%
1970	1,034		−3.2%
1980	1,180		14.1%
1990	1,212		2.7%
2000	1,200		−1.0%
2010	1,126		−6.2%
2020	907		−19.4%
U.S. Decennial Census

=== 2020 census ===
As of the 2020 census, Anton had a population of 907. The median age was 39.7 years. 26.2% of residents were under the age of 18 and 17.6% of residents were 65 years of age or older. For every 100 females there were 95.1 males, and for every 100 females age 18 and over there were 95.6 males age 18 and over.

As of the 2020 census, 0% of residents lived in urban areas, while 100.0% lived in rural areas.

There were 357 households in Anton, of which 31.4% had children under the age of 18 living in them. Of all households, 47.6% were married-couple households, 18.8% were households with a male householder and no spouse or partner present, and 29.4% were households with a female householder and no spouse or partner present. About 27.4% of all households were made up of individuals and 16.6% had someone living alone who was 65 years of age or older.

There were 424 housing units, of which 15.8% were vacant. Among occupied housing units, 76.2% were owner-occupied and 23.8% were renter-occupied. The homeowner vacancy rate was <0.1% and the rental vacancy rate was 20.9%.

Racial composition as of the 2020 census
Race	Percent
White	53.4%
Black or African American	2.8%
American Indian and Alaska Native	1.8%
Asian	0%
Native Hawaiian and Other Pacific Islander	0%
Some other race	11.2%
Two or more races	30.9%
Hispanic or Latino (of any race)	53.7%

=== 2000 census ===
As of the 2000 census, there were 1,200 people, 423 households, and 313 families residing in the city. The population density was 1,512.4 inhabitants per square mile (583.9/km^{2}). There were 465 housing units at an average density of 586.1 per square mile (226.3/km^{2}). The racial makeup of the city was 71.92% White, 5.33% African American, 21.17% from other races, and 1.58% from two or more races. Hispanic or Latino of any race were 45.83% of the population.

There were 423 households, out of which 39.7% had children under the age of 18 living with them, 61.5% were married couples living together, 9.0% had a female householder with no husband present, and 25.8% were non-families. 23.9% of all households were made up of individuals, and 14.7% had someone living alone who was 65 years of age or older. The average household size was 2.84 and the average family size was 3.40.

In the city, the population was spread out, with 32.8% under the age of 18, 7.8% from 18 to 24, 25.9% from 25 to 44, 18.8% from 45 to 64, and 14.8% who were 65 years of age or older. The median age was 34 years. For every 100 females, there were 95.4 males. For every 100 females age 18 and over, there were 89.9 males.

The median income for a household in the city was $30,924, and the median income for a family was $36,250. Males had a median income of $26,188 versus $18,036 for females. The per capita income for the city was $13,001. About 15.0% of families and 21.6% of the population were below the poverty line, including 23.8% of those under age 18 and 21.5% of those age 65 or over.

== Education ==
Anton is served by the Anton Independent School District and is home to the Anton High School Bulldogs.
