= Lake Amon G. Carter =

Lake in Montague County, Texas, United States

Coordinates: 33.479°N 97.884°W

Lake Amon G. Carter is situated 6 miles south of Bowie in Montague county, Texas, and is situated on Big Sandy Creek. Lake Amon G. Carter is technically two lakes in one. The original lake was built in 1956 and has a different type of habitat than the 500-acre extension constructed in 1985. In the thirty-year gap between the original lake and the expansion there became a habitat in the original lake that does not exist in the new expansion. The lake has a surface area of 1,848 acres and a maximum depth of 50 feet. The conservation pool elevation is 920 feet above sea level.

The lake is about 30 minutes northwest of Fort Worth, Texas. The lake is smaller than some surrounding lakes in the area and around the Dallas Fort Worth metroplex. The size of this lake was expanded to help control the amount of flood water that would go down stream to several flood plains.

== History ==
The dam first started construction in 1955 and was named the Amon G. Carter lake because of the Fort Worth, philanthropist and businessman by the same name. This initial dam and lake were made to control the flow of water and stop flood output along the Big Sandy Creek. The dam was completed in August 1956. Only about 30 years later was there another impoundment to expand the lake. The lakes are connected by a twenty-foot tunnel. Lake Amon G. Carter is also used for some mining that are in the area.

== Wildlife ==
Lake Amon G. Carter holds several species of fish including Largemouth Bass, Catfish, Crappie, White Bass and Sunfish. The older section of the lake has rocky shorelines and cattail beds while the new lake has much standing timber and many weed beds along the shoreline. Lake Amon G. Carter is a popular site for bass fishing in the spring and fall. There is species of water willow, brushy pondweed and coontail that populate the lake.

The lake is stocked with fish species as "fingerlings" every year to maintain the amount of wildlife that are in the lake.

== Recreation ==
Lake Amon G. Carter is a lake that has several recreational uses such as, boating, fishing, skiing, and camping. The fishing in this lake is better than most Texas lakes as the lake is less turbid than most north Texas lakes.
