= Superior Air Parts Vantage =

American/Chinese aircraft engine

Vantage
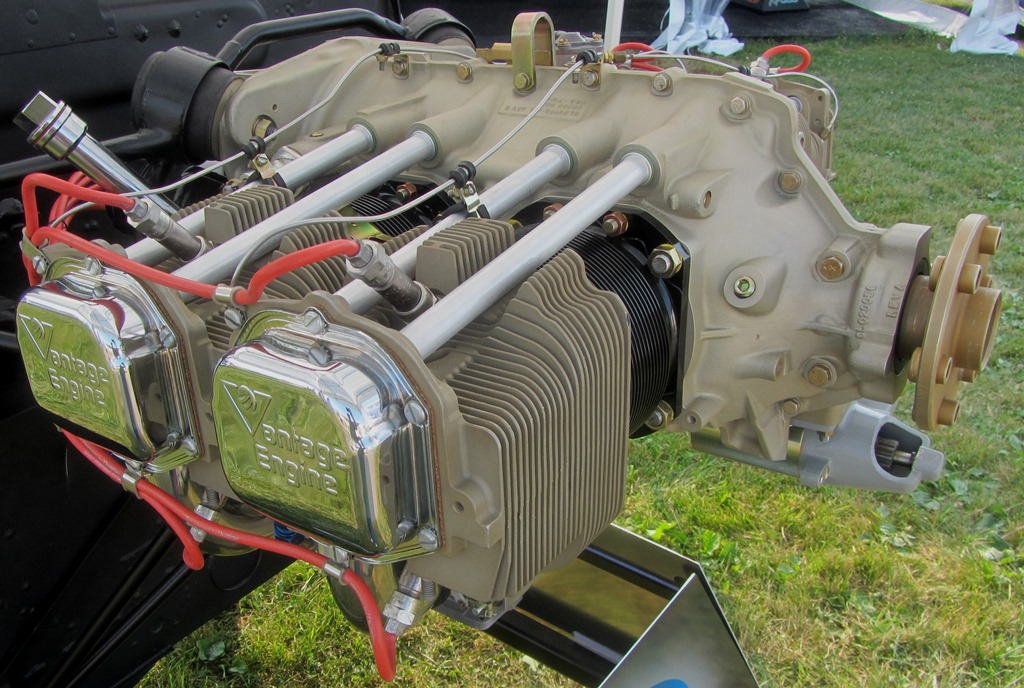
- Type: Piston aircraft engine
- National origin: United States
- Manufacturer: Superior Air Parts
- Major applications: Cessna 172
- Manufactured: 2004–present
- Developed from: Superior Air Parts XP-360

The Superior Air Parts Vantage is a type certified piston aircraft engine developed by Superior Air Parts of Coppell, Texas, United States and based upon the non-certified Superior Air Parts XP-360. The design is officially designated the Superior Air Parts O-360 and IO-360. Vantage is a marketing name.

The company is owned by the Chinese company Superior Aviation Beijing, which is 60% owned by Chairman Cheng Shenzong and 40% owned by Beijing E-Town, an economic development agency of the municipal government of Beijing.

== Development ==
The Vantage engine is a development of the XP-360 experimental engine that was put through the US Federal Aviation Administration engine type certification process starting in 1996. Certification was based on FAR 33 through amendment 20, effective 13 December 2000, application 17 July 2001 and certification was achieved on 31 March 2004. The initial time between overhauls was set at 1,000 hours, with an aim of expanding that to 2,000 hours.

== Design ==
The engine is a four-cylinder, horizontally opposed, four-stroke, 361 cu in (5,916 cc) displacement, air-cooled, direct-drive, gasoline engine design. It produces 165 to 180 hp (123 to 134 kW), depending on the model. It is available in carburetor-equipped and fuel injected versions.

== Variants ==
=== O-360 ===
==== 180 hp models ====
O-360-A1A2
Carburetor-equipped model with a thin wall front main bearing journal crankshaft, for a fixed pitch propeller, and a number 1 style dynafocal engine mount for a rear propeller governor, that produces 180 hp (134 kW) at 2700 rpm, with a compression ratio of 8.5:1 and a basic dry weight of 288 lb (131 kg).
O-360-A2A2
Carburetor-equipped model with a thin wall front main bearing journal crankshaft, for a fixed pitch propeller, and a number 2 style dynafocal engine mount for a rear propeller governor, that produces 180 hp (134 kW) at 2700 rpm, with a compression ratio of 8.5:1 and a basic dry weight of 288 lb (131 kg).
O-360-A3A2
Carburetor-equipped model with a thin wall front main bearing journal crankshaft, for a fixed pitch propeller, and a conical style engine mount for a rear propeller governor, that produces 180 hp (134 kW) at 2700 rpm, with a compression ratio of 8.5:1 and with a basic dry weight of 288 lb (131 kg).
O-360-A4A2
Carburetor-equipped model with a thin wall front main bearing journal crankshaft, for a fixed pitch propeller, and a number 1 style dynafocal engine mount for a front propeller governor, that produces 180 hp (134 kW) at 2700 rpm, with a compression ratio of 8.5:1 and with a basic dry weight of 291 lb (132 kg).
O-360-A5A2
Carburetor-equipped model with a thin wall front main bearing journal crankshaft, for a fixed pitch propeller, and a number 2 style dynafocal engine mount for a front propeller governor, that produces 180 hp (134 kW) at 2700 rpm, with a compression ratio of 8.5:1 and with a basic dry weight of 291 lb (132 kg).
O-360-A6A2
Carburetor-equipped model with a thin wall front main bearing journal crankshaft, for a fixed pitch propeller, and a conical engine mount for a front propeller governor, that produces 180 hp (134 kW) at 2700 rpm, with a compression ratio of 8.5:1 and with a basic dry weight of 291 lb (132 kg).
O-360-B1A2
Carburetor-equipped model with a thin wall front main bearing journal crankshaft, for a constant speed propeller, and a number 1 style dynafocal engine mount for a rear propeller governor, that produces 180 hp (134 kW) at 2700 rpm, with a compression ratio of 8.5:1 and with a basic dry weight of 291 lb (132 kg).
O-360-B2A2
Carburetor-equipped model with a thin wall front main bearing journal crankshaft, for a constant speed propeller, and a number 2 style dynafocal engine mount for a rear propeller governor, that produces 180 hp (134 kW) at 2700 rpm, with a compression ratio of 8.5:1 and with a basic dry weight of 291 lb (132 kg).
O-360-B3A2
Carburetor-equipped model with a thin wall front main bearing journal crankshaft, for a constant speedh propeller, and a conical style engine mount for a rear propeller governor, that produces 180 hp (134 kW) at 2700 rpm, with a compression ratio of 8.5:1 and with a basic dry weight of 291 lb (132 kg).
O-360-B4A2
Carburetor-equipped model with a thin wall front main bearing journal crankshaft, for a constant speed propeller, and a number 1 style dynafocal engine mount for a front propeller governor, that produces 180 hp (134 kW) at 2700 rpm, with a compression ratio of 8.5:1 and with a basic dry weight of 291 lb (132 kg).
O-360-B5A2
Carburetor-equipped model with a thin wall front main bearing journal crankshaft, for a constant speed propeller, and a number 2 style dynafocal engine mount for a front propeller governor, that produces 180 hp (134 kW) at 2700 rpm, with a compression ratio of 8.5:1 and with a basic dry weight of 291 lb (132 kg).
O-360-B6A2
Carburetor-equipped model with a thin wall front main bearing journal crankshaft, for a constant speed propeller, and a conical engine mount for a front propeller governor, that produces 180 hp (134 kW) at 2700 rpm, with a compression ratio of 8.5:1 and with a basic dry weight of 291 lb (132 kg).
O-360-C1A2
Carburetor-equipped model with a heavy wall front main bearing journal crankshaft, for a fixed pitch propeller, and a number 1 style dynafocal engine mount for a rear propeller governor, that produces 180 hp (134 kW) at 2700 rpm, with a compression ratio of 8.5:1 and with a basic dry weight of 291 lb (132 kg).
O-360-C2A2
Carburetor-equipped model with a heavy wall front main bearing journal crankshaft, for a fixed pitch propeller, and a number 2 style dynafocal engine mount for a rear propeller governor, that produces 180 hp (134 kW) at 2700 rpm, with a compression ratio of 8.5:1 and with a basic dry weight of 291 lb (132 kg).
O-360-C3A2
Carburetor-equipped model with a heavy wall front main bearing journal crankshaft, for a fixed pitch propeller, and a conical style engine mount for a rear propeller governor, that produces 180 hp (134 kW) at 2700 rpm, with a compression ratio of 8.5:1 and with a basic dry weight of 291 lb (132 kg).
O-360-C4A2
Carburetor-equipped model with a heavy wall front main bearing journal crankshaft, for a fixed pitch propeller, and a number 1 style dynafocal engine mount for a front propeller governor, that produces 180 hp (134 kW) at 2700 rpm, with a compression ratio of 8.5:1 and with a basic dry weight of 294 lb (133 kg).
O-360-C5A2
Carburetor-equipped model with a heavy wall front main bearing journal crankshaft, for a fixed pitch propeller, and a number 2 style dynafocal engine mount for a front propeller governor, that produces 180 hp (134 kW) at 2700 rpm, with a compression ratio of 8.5:1 and with a basic dry weight of 294 lb (133 kg).
O-360-C6A2
Carburetor-equipped model with a heavy wall front main bearing journal crankshaft, for a fixed pitch propeller, and a conical engine mount for a front propeller governor, that produces 180 hp (134 kW) at 2700 rpm, with a compression ratio of 8.5:1 and with a basic dry weight of 294 lb (133 kg).
O-360-D1A2
Carburetor-equipped model with a heavy wall front main bearing journal crankshaft, for a constant speed propeller, and a number 1 style dynafocal engine mount for a rear propeller governor, that produces 180 hp (134 kW) at 2700 rpm, with a compression ratio of 8.5:1 and with a basic dry weight of 294 lb (133 kg).
O-360-D2A2
Carburetor-equipped model with a heavy wall front main bearing journal crankshaft, for a constant speed propeller, and a number 2 style dynafocal engine mount for a rear propeller governor, that produces 180 hp (134 kW) at 2700 rpm, with a compression ratio of 8.5:1 and with a basic dry weight of 294 lb (133 kg).
O-360-D3A2
Carburetor-equipped model with a heavy wall front main bearing journal crankshaft, for a constant speed propeller, and a conical style engine mount for a rear propeller governor, that produces 180 hp (134 kW) at 2700 rpm, with a compression ratio of 8.5:1 and with a basic dry weight of 294 lb (133 kg).
O-360-D4A2
Carburetor-equipped model with a heavy wall front main bearing journal crankshaft, for a constant speed propeller, and a number 1 style dynafocal engine mount for a front propeller governor, that produces 180 hp (134 kW) at 2700 rpm, with a compression ratio of 8.5:1 and with a basic dry weight of 294 lb (133 kg).
O-360-D5A2
Carburetor-equipped model with a heavy wall front main bearing journal crankshaft, for a constant speed propeller, and a number 2 style dynafocal engine mount for a front propeller governor, that produces 180 hp (134 kW) at 2700 rpm, with a compression ratio of 8.5:1 and with a basic dry weight of 294 lb (133 kg).
O-360-D6A2
Carburetor-equipped model with a heavy wall front main bearing journal crankshaft, for a constant speed propeller, and a conical engine mount for a front propeller governor, that produces 180 hp (134 kW) at 2700 rpm, with a compression ratio of 8.5:1 and with a basic dry weight of 294 lb (133 kg).
O-360-E1A2
Carburetor-equipped model with a solid front main bearing journal crankshaft, for a fixed pitch propeller, and a number 1 style dynafocal engine mount for a rear propeller governor, that produces 180 hp (134 kW) at 2700 rpm, with a compression ratio of 8.5:1 and with a basic dry weight of 295 lb (134 kg).
O-360-E2A2
Carburetor-equipped model with a thin wall front main bearing journal crankshaft, for a fixed pitch propeller, and a number 2 style dynafocal engine mount for a rear propeller governor, that produces 180 hp (134 kW) at 2700 rpm, with a compression ratio of 8.5:1 and with a basic dry weight of 295 lb (134 kg).
O-360-E3A2
Carburetor-equipped model with a solid front main bearing journal crankshaft, for a fixed pitch propeller, and a conical style engine mount for a rear propeller governor, that produces 180 hp (134 kW) at 2700 rpm, with a compression ratio of 8.5:1 and with a basic dry weight of 295 lb (134 kg).
O-360-E4A2
Carburetor-equipped model with a solid front main bearing journal crankshaft, for a fixed pitch propeller, and a number 1 style dynafocal engine mount for a front propeller governor, that produces 180 hp (134 kW) at 2700 rpm, with a compression ratio of 8.5:1 and with a basic dry weight of 298 lb (135 kg).
O-360-E5A2
Carburetor-equipped model with a solid front main bearing journal crankshaft, for a fixed pitch propeller, and a number 2 style dynafocal engine mount for a front propeller governor, that produces 180 hp (134 kW) at 2700 rpm, with a compression ratio of 8.5:1 and with a basic dry weight of 298 lb (135 kg).
O-360-E6A2
Carburetor-equipped model with a solid front main bearing journal crankshaft, for a fixed pitch propeller, and a conical engine mount for a front propeller governor, that produces 180 hp (134 kW) at 2700 rpm, with a compression ratio of 8.5:1 and with a basic dry weight of 298 lb (135 kg).

==== 168 hp models ====
O-360-A1A1
Carburetor-equipped model with a thin wall front main bearing journal crankshaft, for a fixed pitch propeller, and a number 1 style dynafocal engine mount for a rear propeller governor, that produces 168 hp (125 kW) at 2700 rpm, with a compression ratio of 7.2:1 and a basic dry weight of 288 lb (131 kg).
O-360-A2A1
Carburetor-equipped model with a thin wall front main bearing journal crankshaft, for a fixed pitch propeller, and a number 2 style dynafocal engine mount for a rear propeller governor, that produces 168 hp (125 kW) at 2700 rpm, with a compression ratio of 7.2:1 and a basic dry weight of 288 lb (131 kg).
O-360-A3A1
Carburetor-equipped model with a thin wall front main bearing journal crankshaft, for a fixed pitch propeller, and a conical style engine mount for a rear propeller governor, that produces 168 hp (125 kW) at 2700 rpm, with a compression ratio of 7.2:1 and with a basic dry weight of 288 lb (131 kg).
O-360-A4A1
Carburetor-equipped model with a thin wall front main bearing journal crankshaft, for a fixed pitch propeller, and a number 1 style dynafocal engine mount for a front propeller governor, that produces 168 hp (125 kW) at 2700 rpm, with a compression ratio of 7.2:1 and with a basic dry weight of 291 lb (132 kg).
O-360-A5A1
Carburetor-equipped model with a thin wall front main bearing journal crankshaft, for a fixed pitch propeller, and a number 2 style dynafocal engine mount for a front propeller governor, that produces 168 hp (125 kW) at 2700 rpm, with a compression ratio of 7.2:1 and with a basic dry weight of 291 lb (132 kg).
O-360-B1A1
Carburetor-equipped model with a thin wall front main bearing journal crankshaft, for a constant speed propeller, and a number 1 style dynafocal engine mount for a rear propeller governor, that produces 168 hp (125 kW) at 2700 rpm, with a compression ratio of 7.2:1 and with a basic dry weight of 291 lb (132 kg).
O-360-B2A1
Carburetor-equipped model with a thin wall front main bearing journal crankshaft, for a constant speed propeller, and a number 2 style dynafocal engine mount for a rear propeller governor, that produces 168 hp (125 kW) at 2700 rpm, with a compression ratio of 7.2:1 and with a basic dry weight of 291 lb (132 kg).
O-360-B3A1
Carburetor-equipped model with a thin wall front main bearing journal crankshaft, for a constant speedh propeller, and a conical style engine mount for a rear propeller governor, that produces 168 hp (125 kW) at 2700 rpm, with a compression ratio of 7.2:1 and with a basic dry weight of 291 lb (132 kg).
O-360-B4A1
Carburetor-equipped model with a thin wall front main bearing journal crankshaft, for a constant speed propeller, and a number 1 style dynafocal engine mount for a front propeller governor, that produces 168 hp (125 kW) at 2700 rpm, with a compression ratio of 7.2:1 and with a basic dry weight of 291 lb (132 kg).
O-360-B5A1
Carburetor-equipped model with a thin wall front main bearing journal crankshaft, for a constant speed propeller, and a number 2 style dynafocal engine mount for a front propeller governor, that produces 168 hp (125 kW) at 2700 rpm, with a compression ratio of 7.2:1 and with a basic dry weight of 291 lb (132 kg).
O-360-B6A1
Carburetor-equipped model with a thin wall front main bearing journal crankshaft, for a constant speed propeller, and a conical engine mount for a front propeller governor, that produces 168 hp (125 kW) at 2700 rpm, with a compression ratio of 7.2:1 and with a basic dry weight of 291 lb (132 kg).
O-360-C1A1
Carburetor-equipped model with a heavy wall front main bearing journal crankshaft, for a fixed pitch propeller, and a number 1 style dynafocal engine mount for a rear propeller governor, that produces 168 hp (125 kW) at 2700 rpm, with a compression ratio of 7.2:1 and with a basic dry weight of 291 lb (132 kg).
O-360-C2A1
Carburetor-equipped model with a heavy wall front main bearing journal crankshaft, for a fixed pitch propeller, and a number 2 style dynafocal engine mount for a rear propeller governor, that produces 168 hp (125 kW) at 2700 rpm, with a compression ratio of 7.2:1 and with a basic dry weight of 291 lb (132 kg).
O-360-C3A1
Carburetor-equipped model with a heavy wall front main bearing journal crankshaft, for a fixed pitch propeller, and a conical style engine mount for a rear propeller governor, that produces 168 hp (125 kW) at 2700 rpm, with a compression ratio of 7.2:1 and with a basic dry weight of 291 lb (132 kg).
O-360-C4A1
Carburetor-equipped model with a heavy wall front main bearing journal crankshaft, for a fixed pitch propeller, and a number 1 style dynafocal engine mount for a front propeller governor, that produces 168 hp (125 kW) at 2700 rpm, with a compression ratio of 7.2:1 and with a basic dry weight of 294 lb (133 kg).
O-360-C5A1
Carburetor-equipped model with a heavy wall front main bearing journal crankshaft, for a fixed pitch propeller, and a number 2 style dynafocal engine mount for a front propeller governor, that produces 168 hp (125 kW) at 2700 rpm, with a compression ratio of 7.2:1 and with a basic dry weight of 294 lb (133 kg).
O-360-C6A1
Carburetor-equipped model with a heavy wall front main bearing journal crankshaft, for a fixed pitch propeller, and a conical engine mount for a front propeller governor, that produces 168 hp (125 kW) at 2700 rpm, with a compression ratio of 7.2:1 and with a basic dry weight of 294 lb (133 kg).
O-360-D1A1
Carburetor-equipped model with a heavy wall front main bearing journal crankshaft, for a constant speed propeller, and a number 1 style dynafocal engine mount for a rear propeller governor, that produces 168 hp (125 kW) at 2700 rpm, with a compression ratio of 7.2:1 and with a basic dry weight of 294 lb (133 kg).
O-360-D2A1
Carburetor-equipped model with a heavy wall front main bearing journal crankshaft, for a constant speed propeller, and a number 2 style dynafocal engine mount for a rear propeller governor, that produces 168 hp (125 kW) at 2700 rpm, with a compression ratio of 7.2:1 and with a basic dry weight of 294 lb (133 kg).
O-360-D3A1
Carburetor-equipped model with a heavy wall front main bearing journal crankshaft, for a constant speed propeller, and a conical style engine mount for a rear propeller governor, that produces 168 hp (125 kW) at 2700 rpm, with a compression ratio of 7.2:1 and with a basic dry weight of 294 lb (133 kg).
O-360-D4A1
Carburetor-equipped model with a heavy wall front main bearing journal crankshaft, for a constant speed propeller, and a number 1 style dynafocal engine mount for a front propeller governor, that produces 168 hp (125 kW) at 2700 rpm, with a compression ratio of 7.2:1 and with a basic dry weight of 294 lb (133 kg).
O-360-D5A1
Carburetor-equipped model with a heavy wall front main bearing journal crankshaft, for a constant speed propeller, and a number 2 style dynafocal engine mount for a front propeller governor, that produces 168 hp (125 kW) at 2700 rpm, with a compression ratio of 7.2:1 and with a basic dry weight of 294 lb (133 kg).
O-360-D6A1
Carburetor-equipped model with a heavy wall front main bearing journal crankshaft, for a constant speed propeller, and a conical engine mount for a front propeller governor, that produces 168 hp (125 kW) at 2700 rpm, with a compression ratio of 7.2:1 and with a basic dry weight of 294 lb (133 kg).
O-360-E1A1
Carburetor-equipped model with a solid front main bearing journal crankshaft, for a fixed pitch propeller, and a number 1 style dynafocal engine mount for a rear propeller governor, that produces 168 hp (125 kW) at 2700 rpm, with a compression ratio of 7.2:1 and with a basic dry weight of 295 lb (134 kg).
O-360-E2A1
Carburetor-equipped model with a thin wall front main bearing journal crankshaft, for a fixed pitch propeller, and a number 2 style dynafocal engine mount for a rear propeller governor, that produces 168 hp (125 kW) at 2700 rpm, with a compression ratio of 7.2:1 and with a basic dry weight of 295 lb (134 kg).
O-360-E3A1
Carburetor-equipped model with a solid front main bearing journal crankshaft, for a fixed pitch propeller, and a conical style engine mount for a rear propeller governor, that produces 168 hp (125 kW) at 2700 rpm, with a compression ratio of 7.2:1 and with a basic dry weight of 295 lb (134 kg).
O-360-E4A1
Carburetor-equipped model with a solid front main bearing journal crankshaft, for a fixed pitch propeller, and a number 1 style dynafocal engine mount for a front propeller governor, that produces 168 hp (125 kW) at 2700 rpm, with a compression ratio of 7.2:1 and with a basic dry weight of 298 lb (135 kg).
O-360-E5A1
Carburetor-equipped model with a solid front main bearing journal crankshaft, for a fixed pitch propeller, and a number 2 style dynafocal engine mount for a front propeller governor, that produces 168 hp (125 kW) at 2700 rpm, with a compression ratio of 7.2:1 and with a basic dry weight of 298 lb (135 kg).
O-360-E6A1
Carburetor-equipped model with a solid front main bearing journal crankshaft, for a fixed pitch propeller, and a conical engine mount for a front propeller governor, that produces 168 hp (125 kW) at 2700 rpm, with a compression ratio of 7.2:1 and with a basic dry weight of 298 lb (135 kg).

=== IO-360 ===
==== 180 hp models ====
IO-360-A1A2
Fuel injection-equipped model with a thin wall front main bearing journal crankshaft, for a fixed pitch propeller, and a number 1 style dynafocal engine mount for a rear propeller governor, that produces 180 hp (134 kW) at 2700 rpm, with a compression ratio of 8.5:1 and a basic dry weight of 290 lb (132 kg).
IO-360-A2A2
Fuel injection-equipped model with a thin wall front main bearing journal crankshaft, for a fixed pitch propeller, and a number 2 style dynafocal engine mount for a rear propeller governor, that produces 180 hp (134 kW) at 2700 rpm, with a compression ratio of 8.5:1 and a basic dry weight of 290 lb (132 kg).
IO-360-A3A2
Fuel injection-equipped model with a thin wall front main bearing journal crankshaft, for a fixed pitch propeller, and a conical style engine mount for a rear propeller governor, that produces 180 hp (134 kW) at 2700 rpm, with a compression ratio of 8.5:1 and with a basic dry weight of 290 lb (132 kg).
IO-360-A4A2
Fuel injection-equipped model with a thin wall front main bearing journal crankshaft, for a fixed pitch propeller, and a number 1 style dynafocal engine mount for a front propeller governor, that produces 180 hp (134 kW) at 2700 rpm, with a compression ratio of 8.5:1 and with a basic dry weight of 293 lb (133 kg).
IO-360-A5A2
Fuel injection-equipped model with a thin wall front main bearing journal crankshaft, for a fixed pitch propeller, and a number 2 style dynafocal engine mount for a front propeller governor, that produces 180 hp (134 kW) at 2700 rpm, with a compression ratio of 8.5:1 and with a basic dry weight of 293 lb (133 kg).
IO-360-A6A2
Fuel injection-equipped model with a thin wall front main bearing journal crankshaft, for a fixed pitch propeller, and a conical engine mount for a front propeller governor, that produces 180 hp (134 kW) at 2700 rpm, with a compression ratio of 8.5:1 and with a basic dry weight of 293 lb (133 kg).
IO-360-B1A2
Fuel injection-equipped model with a thin wall front main bearing journal crankshaft, for a constant speed propeller, and a number 1 style dynafocal engine mount for a rear propeller governor, that produces 180 hp (134 kW) at 2700 rpm, with a compression ratio of 8.5:1 and with a basic dry weight of 293 lb (133 kg).
IO-360-B2A2
Fuel injection-equipped model with a thin wall front main bearing journal crankshaft, for a constant speed propeller, and a number 2 style dynafocal engine mount for a rear propeller governor, that produces 180 hp (134 kW) at 2700 rpm, with a compression ratio of 8.5:1 and with a basic dry weight of 293 lb (133 kg).
IO-360-B3A2
Fuel injection-equipped model with a thin wall front main bearing journal crankshaft, for a constant speedh propeller, and a conical style engine mount for a rear propeller governor, that produces 180 hp (134 kW) at 2700 rpm, with a compression ratio of 8.5:1 and with a basic dry weight of 293 lb (133 kg).
IO-360-B4A2
Fuel injection-equipped model with a thin wall front main bearing journal crankshaft, for a constant speed propeller, and a number 1 style dynafocal engine mount for a front propeller governor, that produces 180 hp (134 kW) at 2700 rpm, with a compression ratio of 8.5:1 and with a basic dry weight of 293 lb (133 kg).
IO-360-B5A2
Fuel injection-equipped model with a thin wall front main bearing journal crankshaft, for a constant speed propeller, and a number 2 style dynafocal engine mount for a front propeller governor, that produces 180 hp (134 kW) at 2700 rpm, with a compression ratio of 8.5:1 and with a basic dry weight of 293 lb (133 kg).
IO-360-B6A2
Fuel injection-equipped model with a thin wall front main bearing journal crankshaft, for a constant speed propeller, and a conical engine mount for a front propeller governor, that produces 180 hp (134 kW) at 2700 rpm, with a compression ratio of 8.5:1 and with a basic dry weight of 293 lb (133 kg).
IO-360-C1A2
Fuel injection-equipped model with a heavy wall front main bearing journal crankshaft, for a fixed pitch propeller, and a number 1 style dynafocal engine mount for a rear propeller governor, that produces 180 hp (134 kW) at 2700 rpm, with a compression ratio of 8.5:1 and with a basic dry weight of 293 lb (133 kg).
IO-360-C2A2
Fuel injection-equipped model with a heavy wall front main bearing journal crankshaft, for a fixed pitch propeller, and a number 2 style dynafocal engine mount for a rear propeller governor, that produces 180 hp (134 kW) at 2700 rpm, with a compression ratio of 8.5:1 and with a basic dry weight of 293 lb (133 kg).
IO-360-C3A2
Fuel injection-equipped model with a heavy wall front main bearing journal crankshaft, for a fixed pitch propeller, and a conical style engine mount for a rear propeller governor, that produces 180 hp (134 kW) at 2700 rpm, with a compression ratio of 8.5:1 and with a basic dry weight of 293 lb (133 kg).
IO-360-C4A2
Fuel injection-equipped model with a heavy wall front main bearing journal crankshaft, for a fixed pitch propeller, and a number 1 style dynafocal engine mount for a front propeller governor, that produces 180 hp (134 kW) at 2700 rpm, with a compression ratio of 8.5:1 and with a basic dry weight of 296 lb (134 kg).
IO-360-C5A2
Fuel injection-equipped model with a heavy wall front main bearing journal crankshaft, for a fixed pitch propeller, and a number 2 style dynafocal engine mount for a front propeller governor, that produces 180 hp (134 kW) at 2700 rpm, with a compression ratio of 8.5:1 and with a basic dry weight of 296 lb (134 kg).
IO-360-C6A2
Fuel injection-equipped model with a heavy wall front main bearing journal crankshaft, for a fixed pitch propeller, and a conical engine mount for a front propeller governor, that produces 180 hp (134 kW) at 2700 rpm, with a compression ratio of 8.5:1 and with a basic dry weight of 296 lb (134 kg).
IO-360-D1A2
Fuel injection-equipped model with a heavy wall front main bearing journal crankshaft, for a constant speed propeller, and a number 1 style dynafocal engine mount for a rear propeller governor, that produces 180 hp (134 kW) at 2700 rpm, with a compression ratio of 8.5:1 and with a basic dry weight of 296 lb (134 kg).
IO-360-D2A2
Fuel injection-equipped model with a heavy wall front main bearing journal crankshaft, for a constant speed propeller, and a number 2 style dynafocal engine mount for a rear propeller governor, that produces 180 hp (134 kW) at 2700 rpm, with a compression ratio of 8.5:1 and with a basic dry weight of 296 lb (134 kg).
IO-360-D3A2
Fuel injection-equipped model with a heavy wall front main bearing journal crankshaft, for a constant speed propeller, and a conical style engine mount for a rear propeller governor, that produces 180 hp (134 kW) at 2700 rpm, with a compression ratio of 8.5:1 and with a basic dry weight of 296 lb (134 kg).
IO-360-D4A2
Fuel injection-equipped model with a heavy wall front main bearing journal crankshaft, for a constant speed propeller, and a number 1 style dynafocal engine mount for a front propeller governor, that produces 180 hp (134 kW) at 2700 rpm, with a compression ratio of 8.5:1 and with a basic dry weight of 296 lb (134 kg).
IO-360-D5A2
Fuel injection-equipped model with a heavy wall front main bearing journal crankshaft, for a constant speed propeller, and a number 2 style dynafocal engine mount for a front propeller governor, that produces 180 hp (134 kW) at 2700 rpm, with a compression ratio of 8.5:1 and with a basic dry weight of 296 lb (134 kg).
IO-360-D6A2
Fuel injection-equipped model with a heavy wall front main bearing journal crankshaft, for a constant speed propeller, and a conical engine mount for a front propeller governor, that produces 180 hp (134 kW) at 2700 rpm, with a compression ratio of 8.5:1 and with a basic dry weight of 296 lb (134 kg).
IO-360-E1A2
Fuel injection-equipped model with a solid front main bearing journal crankshaft, for a fixed pitch propeller, and a number 1 style dynafocal engine mount for a rear propeller governor, that produces 180 hp (134 kW) at 2700 rpm, with a compression ratio of 8.5:1 and with a basic dry weight of 297 lb (135 kg).
IO-360-E2A2
Fuel injection-equipped model with a thin wall front main bearing journal crankshaft, for a fixed pitch propeller, and a number 2 style dynafocal engine mount for a rear propeller governor, that produces 180 hp (134 kW) at 2700 rpm, with a compression ratio of 8.5:1 and with a basic dry weight of 297 lb (135 kg).
IO-360-E3A2
Fuel injection-equipped model with a solid front main bearing journal crankshaft, for a fixed pitch propeller, and a conical style engine mount for a rear propeller governor, that produces 180 hp (134 kW) at 2700 rpm, with a compression ratio of 8.5:1 and with a basic dry weight of 297 lb (135 kg).
IO-360-E4A2
Fuel injection-equipped model with a solid front main bearing journal crankshaft, for a fixed pitch propeller, and a number 1 style dynafocal engine mount for a front propeller governor, that produces 180 hp (134 kW) at 2700 rpm, with a compression ratio of 8.5:1 and with a basic dry weight of 300 lb (140 kg).
IO-360-E5A2
Fuel injection-equipped model with a solid front main bearing journal crankshaft, for a fixed pitch propeller, and a number 2 style dynafocal engine mount for a front propeller governor, that produces 180 hp (134 kW) at 2700 rpm, with a compression ratio of 8.5:1 and with a basic dry weight of 300 lb (140 kg).
IO-360-E6A2
Fuel injection-equipped model with a solid front main bearing journal crankshaft, for a fixed pitch propeller, and a conical engine mount for a front propeller governor, that produces 180 hp (134 kW) at 2700 rpm, with a compression ratio of 8.5:1 and with a basic dry weight of 300 lb (140 kg).

==== 168 hp models ====
IO-360-A1A1
Fuel injection-equipped model with a thin wall front main bearing journal crankshaft, for a fixed pitch propeller, and a number 1 style dynafocal engine mount for a rear propeller governor, that produces 168 hp (125 kW) at 2700 rpm, with a compression ratio of 7.2:1 and a basic dry weight of 290 lb (132 kg).
IO-360-A2A1
Fuel injection-equipped model with a thin wall front main bearing journal crankshaft, for a fixed pitch propeller, and a number 2 style dynafocal engine mount for a rear propeller governor, that produces 168 hp (125 kW) at 2700 rpm, with a compression ratio of 7.2:1 and a basic dry weight of 290 lb (132 kg).
IO-360-A3A1
Fuel injection-equipped model with a thin wall front main bearing journal crankshaft, for a fixed pitch propeller, and a conical style engine mount for a rear propeller governor, that produces 168 hp (125 kW) at 2700 rpm, with a compression ratio of 7.2:1 and with a basic dry weight of 290 lb (132 kg).
IO-360-A4A1
Fuel injection-equipped model with a thin wall front main bearing journal crankshaft, for a fixed pitch propeller, and a number 1 style dynafocal engine mount for a front propeller governor, that produces 168 hp (125 kW) at 2700 rpm, with a compression ratio of 7.2:1 and with a basic dry weight of 293 lb (133 kg).
IO-360-A5A1
Fuel injection-equipped model with a thin wall front main bearing journal crankshaft, for a fixed pitch propeller, and a number 2 style dynafocal engine mount for a front propeller governor, that produces 168 hp (125 kW) at 2700 rpm, with a compression ratio of 7.2:1 and with a basic dry weight of 293 lb (133 kg).
IO-360-A6A1
Fuel injection-equipped model with a thin wall front main bearing journal crankshaft, for a fixed pitch propeller, and a conical engine mount for a front propeller governor, that produces 168 hp (125 kW) at 2700 rpm, with a compression ratio of 7.2:1 and with a basic dry weight of 293 lb (133 kg).
IO-360-B1A1
Fuel injection-equipped model with a thin wall front main bearing journal crankshaft, for a constant speed propeller, and a number 1 style dynafocal engine mount for a rear propeller governor, that produces 168 hp (125 kW) at 2700 rpm, with a compression ratio of 7.2:1 and with a basic dry weight of 293 lb (133 kg).
IO-360-B2A1
Fuel injection-equipped model with a thin wall front main bearing journal crankshaft, for a constant speed propeller, and a number 2 style dynafocal engine mount for a rear propeller governor, that produces 168 hp (125 kW) at 2700 rpm, with a compression ratio of 7.2:1 and with a basic dry weight of 293 lb (133 kg).
IO-360-B3A1
Fuel injection-equipped model with a thin wall front main bearing journal crankshaft, for a constant speedh propeller, and a conical style engine mount for a rear propeller governor, that produces 168 hp (125 kW) at 2700 rpm, with a compression ratio of 7.2:1 and with a basic dry weight of 293 lb (133 kg).
IO-360-B4A1
Fuel injection-equipped model with a thin wall front main bearing journal crankshaft, for a constant speed propeller, and a number 1 style dynafocal engine mount for a front propeller governor, that produces 168 hp (125 kW) at 2700 rpm, with a compression ratio of 7.2:1 and with a basic dry weight of 293 lb (133 kg).
IO-360-B5A1
Fuel injection-equipped model with a thin wall front main bearing journal crankshaft, for a constant speed propeller, and a number 2 style dynafocal engine mount for a front propeller governor, that produces 168 hp (125 kW) at 2700 rpm, with a compression ratio of 7.2:1 and with a basic dry weight of 293 lb (133 kg).
IO-360-B6A1
Fuel injection-equipped model with a thin wall front main bearing journal crankshaft, for a constant speed propeller, and a conical engine mount for a front propeller governor, that produces 168 hp (125 kW) at 2700 rpm, with a compression ratio of 7.2:1 and with a basic dry weight of 293 lb (133 kg).
IO-360-C1A1
Fuel injection-equipped model with a heavy wall front main bearing journal crankshaft, for a fixed pitch propeller, and a number 1 style dynafocal engine mount for a rear propeller governor, that produces 168 hp (125 kW) at 2700 rpm, with a compression ratio of 7.2:1 and with a basic dry weight of 293 lb (133 kg).
IO-360-C2A1
Fuel injection-equipped model with a heavy wall front main bearing journal crankshaft, for a fixed pitch propeller, and a number 2 style dynafocal engine mount for a rear propeller governor, that produces 168 hp (125 kW) at 2700 rpm, with a compression ratio of 7.2:1 and with a basic dry weight of 293 lb (133 kg).
IO-360-C3A1
Fuel injection-equipped model with a heavy wall front main bearing journal crankshaft, for a fixed pitch propeller, and a conical style engine mount for a rear propeller governor, that produces 168 hp (125 kW) at 2700 rpm, with a compression ratio of 7.2:1 and with a basic dry weight of 293 lb (133 kg).
IO-360-C4A1
Fuel injection-equipped model with a heavy wall front main bearing journal crankshaft, for a fixed pitch propeller, and a number 1 style dynafocal engine mount for a front propeller governor, that produces 168 hp (125 kW) at 2700 rpm, with a compression ratio of 7.2:1 and with a basic dry weight of 296 lb (134 kg).
IO-360-C5A1
Fuel injection-equipped model with a heavy wall front main bearing journal crankshaft, for a fixed pitch propeller, and a number 2 style dynafocal engine mount for a front propeller governor, that produces 168 hp (125 kW) at 2700 rpm, with a compression ratio of 7.2:1 and with a basic dry weight of 296 lb (134 kg).
IO-360-C6A1
Fuel injection-equipped model with a heavy wall front main bearing journal crankshaft, for a fixed pitch propeller, and a conical engine mount for a front propeller governor, that produces 168 hp (125 kW) at 2700 rpm, with a compression ratio of 7.2:1 and with a basic dry weight of 296 lb (134 kg).
IO-360-D1A1
Fuel injection-equipped model with a heavy wall front main bearing journal crankshaft, for a constant speed propeller, and a number 1 style dynafocal engine mount for a rear propeller governor, that produces 168 hp (125 kW) at 2700 rpm, with a compression ratio of 7.2:1 and with a basic dry weight of 296 lb (134 kg).
IO-360-D2A1
Fuel injection-equipped model with a heavy wall front main bearing journal crankshaft, for a constant speed propeller, and a number 2 style dynafocal engine mount for a rear propeller governor, that produces 168 hp (125 kW) at 2700 rpm, with a compression ratio of 7.2:1 and with a basic dry weight of 296 lb (134 kg).
IO-360-D3A1
Fuel injection-equipped model with a heavy wall front main bearing journal crankshaft, for a constant speed propeller, and a conical style engine mount for a rear propeller governor, that produces 168 hp (125 kW) at 2700 rpm, with a compression ratio of 7.2:1 and with a basic dry weight of 296 lb (134 kg).
IO-360-D4A1
Fuel injection-equipped model with a heavy wall front main bearing journal crankshaft, for a constant speed propeller, and a number 1 style dynafocal engine mount for a front propeller governor, that produces 168 hp (125 kW) at 2700 rpm, with a compression ratio of 7.2:1 and with a basic dry weight of 296 lb (134 kg).
IO-360-D5A1
Fuel injection-equipped model with a heavy wall front main bearing journal crankshaft, for a constant speed propeller, and a number 2 style dynafocal engine mount for a front propeller governor, that produces 168 hp (125 kW) at 2700 rpm, with a compression ratio of 7.2:1 and with a basic dry weight of 296 lb (134 kg).
IO-360-D6A1
Fuel injection-equipped model with a heavy wall front main bearing journal crankshaft, for a constant speed propeller, and a conical engine mount for a front propeller governor, that produces 168 hp (125 kW) at 2700 rpm, with a compression ratio of 7.2:1 and with a basic dry weight of 296 lb (134 kg).
IO-360-E1A1
Fuel injection-equipped model with a solid front main bearing journal crankshaft, for a fixed pitch propeller, and a number 1 style dynafocal engine mount for a rear propeller governor, that produces 168 hp (125 kW) at 2700 rpm, with a compression ratio of 7.2:1 and with a basic dry weight of 297 lb (135 kg).
IO-360-E2A1
Fuel injection-equipped model with a thin wall front main bearing journal crankshaft, for a fixed pitch propeller, and a number 2 style dynafocal engine mount for a rear propeller governor, that produces 168 hp (125 kW) at 2700 rpm, with a compression ratio of 7.2:1 and with a basic dry weight of 297 lb (135 kg).
IO-360-E3A1
Fuel injection-equipped model with a solid front main bearing journal crankshaft, for a fixed pitch propeller, and a conical style engine mount for a rear propeller governor, that produces 168 hp (125 kW) at 2700 rpm, with a compression ratio of 7.2:1 and with a basic dry weight of 297 lb (135 kg).
IO-360-E4A1
Fuel injection-equipped model with a solid front main bearing journal crankshaft, for a fixed pitch propeller, and a number 1 style dynafocal engine mount for a front propeller governor, that produces 168 hp (125 kW) at 2700 rpm, with a compression ratio of 7.2:1 and with a basic dry weight of 300 lb (140 kg).
IO-360-E5A1
Fuel injection-equipped model with a solid front main bearing journal crankshaft, for a fixed pitch propeller, and a number 2 style dynafocal engine mount for a front propeller governor, that produces 168 hp (125 kW) at 2700 rpm, with a compression ratio of 7.2:1 and with a basic dry weight of 300 lb (140 kg).
IO-360-E6A1
Fuel injection-equipped model with a solid front main bearing journal crankshaft, for a fixed pitch propeller, and a conical engine mount for a front propeller governor, that produces 168 hp (125 kW) at 2700 rpm, with a compression ratio of 7.2:1 and with a basic dry weight of 300 lb (140 kg).

== Applications ==
- Cessna 172

== Specifications (O-360-A1A2) ==
Data from TCDS

=== General characteristics ===
- Type: Four-cylinder, dual magneto, horizontally opposed, four-stroke aircraft engine
- Bore: 5.125 in (130 mm)
- Stroke: 4.375 in (111 mm)
- Displacement: 361 cu in (5,916 cc)
- Length: 32.4 in (823 mm)
- Width: 33.4 in (848 mm)
- Height: 24.6 in (625 mm)
- Dry weight: 288 lb (131 kg), dry

=== Components ===
- Fuel system: Precision Airmotive MA-4-5 carburetor
- Fuel type: 100LL or 100VLL avgas or 91 octane automotive gasoline with no alcohol
- Oil system: 8 US qt (8 L) dry sump
- Cooling system: air
- Reduction gear: none

=== Performance ===
- Power output: 180 hp (134 kW)
- Compression ratio: 8.5:1

== See also ==
- Lycoming O-360

Related lists

- List of aircraft engines
