= Superior Air Parts XP-382 =

- Type: Aircraft engine
- National origin: United States
- Manufacturer: Superior Air Parts

The Superior Air Parts XP-382 is an aircraft engine, designed and produced by Superior Air Parts of Coppell, Texas, United States for use in homebuilt aircraft.

The company is owned by the Chinese company Superior Aviation Beijing, which is 60% owned by Chairman Cheng Shenzong and 40% owned by Beijing E-Town, an economic development agency of the municipal government of Beijing.

== Design and development ==
The engine is a four-cylinder four-stroke, horizontally-opposed, 382 cu in (6,260 cc) displacement, fuel injected air-cooled, direct-drive, gasoline engine design. It produces 200 hp (149 kW), with an 8.9:1 compression ratio.

The engine is not type certified and is therefore intended for homebuilt aircraft.

In March 2019 the engine type was withdrawn from service and all customer engines were subject to a mandatory, immediate buy-back by the manufacturer to remove them from service. The company made this decision based on detonation problems found in some XP-400 engines that could not be resolved. Due to parts commonality, the decision was made to buy-back the XP-382 engines as well.

== Specifications (XP-382) ==
Data from Manufacturer

=== General characteristics ===
- Type: Four-cylinder, four-stroke aircraft engine
- Displacement: 382 cc (23.3 cu in)
- Length: 32.8 in (833 mm)
- Width: 33.5 in (851 mm)
- Height: 24.0 in (610 mm)
- Dry weight: 302 lb (137.0 kg)

=== Components ===
- Fuel type: gasoline
- Cooling system: air
- Reduction gear: none

=== Performance ===
- Power output: 200 hp (149 kW)
- Compression ratio: 8.9:1

== See also ==
Related lists

- List of aircraft engines
