= Superior Air Parts Gemini Diesel 100 =

Gemini Diesel 100
- Type: Aircraft engine
- National origin: United States
- Manufacturer: Superior Air Parts

The Superior Air Parts Gemini Diesel 100 is a diesel aircraft engine, under development by Superior Air Parts of Coppell, Texas, United States for use in homebuilt aircraft.

The company is owned by the Chinese company Superior Aviation Beijing, which is 60% owned by Chairman Cheng Shenzong and 40% owned by Beijing E-Town, an economic development agency of the municipal government of Beijing.

== Design and development ==
The Gemini Diesel 100 is a three-cylinder two-stroke, in-line, supercharged liquid-cooled, diesel engine design. It produces 100 hp (75 kW), with a helical gear mechanical gearbox reduction drive with a reduction ratio of 1.586:1.

The engine design uses an opposed-piston engine, with "two-opposing-pistons-per-cylinder", based upon the Second World War 6-cylinder, 12-piston Junkers Jumo 205 engine concept.

The engine was originally developed by UK based Powerplant Developments, who flew development engines for more than 10,000 hours. Superior acquired the company in 2015.

The engine will not be type certified and is therefore intended for homebuilt and light-sport aircraft.

== Specifications (Gemini Diesel 100) ==
Data from Tacke and manufacturer

=== General characteristics ===
- Type: Three-cylinder, two-stroke aircraft uniflow diesel engine
- Bore: 70 mm (2.8 in)
- Stroke: 72 mm (2.8 in)
- Dry weight: 72.5 kg (159.8 lb)

=== Components ===
- Fuel type: Diesel fuel, bio-diesel and Jet-A
- Cooling system: liquid
- Reduction gear: helical gear mechanical gearbox, reduction ratio of 1.586:1

=== Performance ===
- Power output: 100 hp (75 kW)

== See also ==
Related lists

- List of aircraft engines
