= Superior Air Parts XP-320 =

- Type: Aircraft engine
- National origin: United States
- Manufacturer: Superior Air Parts

The Superior Air Parts XP-320 is an aircraft engine, designed and produced by Superior Air Parts of Coppell, Texas, United States for use in homebuilt aircraft.

The company is owned by the Chinese company Superior Aviation Beijing, which is 60% owned by Chairman Cheng Shenzong and 40% owned by Beijing E-Town, an economic development agency of the municipal government of Beijing.

== Design and development ==
The engine is a four-cylinder four-stroke, horizontally-opposed, 320 cu in (5,244 cc) displacement, air-cooled, direct-drive, gasoline engine design. It produces 160 hp (119 kW) standard, although 150 hp (112 kW) and 165 hp (123 kW) versions are available. It is available in both carburetor and fuel injected versions. Compression ratios of 8.5:1, 7:1 and 9:1 are available.

The engine is not type certified and is therefore intended for homebuilt aircraft.

== Specifications (XP-320) ==
Data from Tacke and manufacturer

=== General characteristics ===
- Type: Four-cylinder, four-stroke aircraft engine
- Displacement: 320 cc (19.5 cu in)
- Length: 32.8 in (833 mm)
- Width: 32.3 in (820 mm)
- Height: 24.6 in (625 mm)
- Dry weight: 285 to 290 lb (129.3 to 131.5 kg) depending on configuration

=== Components ===
- Fuel type: gasoline
- Cooling system: air
- Reduction gear: none

=== Performance ===
- Power output: 160 hp (119 kW)
- Compression ratio: 8.5:1

== See also ==
Related lists

- List of aircraft engines
