= Brantley =

Brantley may refer to:

== Places ==
=== United States ===
- Brantley, Alabama, a town
- Brantley County, Georgia
- Brantley Lake, a lake in southwestern New Mexico

== People ==
=== Surname ===
- Ben Brantley (born 1954), American journalist
- Betsy Brantley (born 1955), American actress
- Bobby Brantley (born 1948), American politician
- Caleb Brantley (born 1994), American football player
- Charles Brantley (horse breeder) (1924–2016), Tennessee Walking Horse breeder
- Chris Brantley (born 1970), American football player
- Cliff Brantley (born 1968), American baseball player
- Curtis Brantley (born 1940), American politician and educator
- Ella Thomas Foreacre Brantley (1864–1948), American clubwoman and civic leader
- Jarrell Brantley (born 1996), American basketball player
- Jeff Brantley (born 1963), American baseball player
- Jennifer Brantley, American singer-songwriter
- John Brantley (born 1989), American football player
- John Brantley (linebacker) (born 1965), American football player
- Larry Brantley, American voice actor and comedian
- Mark Brantley (born 1969), St Kitts and Nevis politician
- Maurice Brantley (born 1968), American boxer
- Michael Brantley (born 1987), American baseball player
- Mickey Brantley (born 1961), American baseball player
- Mike Brantley, American bluegrass musician
- Naseim Brantley, American football player
- Rosemary Brantley, American fashion designer
- Scot Brantley (born 1958), American football player
- Susan Brantley (born 1958), American geologist and geochemist
- Theodore M. Brantley (1851–1922), American jurist
- Tom Brantley (born 1970), American jazz musician
- William F. Brantley (1830–1870), American lawyer and soldier
- William Gordon Brantley (1860–1934), American politician and lawyer

=== Given name ===
- Brantley Coile, American inventor
- Brantley Gilbert (born 1985), American singer-songwriter
- Brantley York (1805–1891), American cleric and educator

=== Middle name ===
- W. Brantley Harvey Jr. (1930-2018), American lawyer and politician
- W. Brantley Harvey Sr. (1893-1981), American lawyer and politician

== See also ==
- Brantly (disambiguation)
- Brankley (disambiguation)
