= Superior Air Parts Gemini Diesel 125 =

Diesel aircraft engine under development

Gemini Diesel 125
- Type: Aircraft engine
- National origin: United States
- Manufacturer: Superior Air Parts

The Superior Air Parts Gemini Diesel 125 is a diesel aircraft engine, under development by Superior Air Parts of Coppell, Texas, United States for use in homebuilt aircraft.

The company is owned by the Chinese company Superior Aviation Beijing, which is 60% owned by Chairman Cheng Shenzong and 40% owned by Beijing E-Town, an economic development agency of the municipal government of Beijing.

== Design and development ==
The Gemini Diesel 125 is a three-cylinder two-stroke, in-line, supercharged liquid-cooled, diesel engine design. It produces 125 hp (93 kW), with a helical gear mechanical gearbox reduction drive with a reduction ratio of 1.586:1.

The engine design uses an opposed-piston engine, with "two-opposing-pistons-per-cylinder", based upon the Second World War 6-cylinder, 12-piston Junkers Jumo 205 engine concept.

The engine will not be type certified and is therefore intended for homebuilt and light-sport aircraft.

== Specifications (Gemini Diesel 125) ==
Data from Tacke and manufacturer

=== General characteristics ===
- Type: Three-cylinder, two-stroke aircraft uniflow diesel engine
- Dry weight: 79.5 kg (175.3 lb)

=== Components ===
- Fuel type: Diesel fuel, bio-diesel and Jet-A
- Cooling system: liquid
- Reduction gear: helical gear mechanical gearbox, reduction ratio of 1.586:1

=== Performance ===
- Power output: 125 hp (93 kW)

== See also ==
Related lists

- List of aircraft engines
