= Superior Air Parts XP-400 =

- Type: Aircraft engine
- National origin: United States
- Manufacturer: Superior Air Parts

The Superior Air Parts XP-400 is an aircraft engine, designed and produced by Superior Air Parts of Coppell, Texas, United States for use in homebuilt aircraft.

The company is owned by the Chinese company Superior Aviation Beijing, which is 60% owned by Chairman Cheng Shenzong and 40% owned by Beijing E-Town, an economic development agency of the municipal government of Beijing.

== Design and development ==
The engine is a four-cylinder four-stroke, horizontally-opposed, 400 cu in (6,555 cc) displacement, fuel injected air-cooled, direct-drive, gasoline engine design. It produces 215 hp (160 kW), with an 8.9:1 compression ratio.

The engine is not type certified and is therefore intended for homebuilt aircraft.

In March 2019 the engine type was withdrawn from service and all customer engines were subject to a mandatory, immediate buy-back by the manufacturer to remove them from service. The company made this decision based on detonation problems found in some XP-400 engines that could not be resolved. Due to parts commonality, the decision was made to buy-back the Superior Air Parts XP-382 engines as well.

In February 2020, Superior settled a lawsuit regarding the 2016 fatal crash of a Van's Aircraft RV-8A for US$5M. The crash was due to the failure of the crankshaft in the installed XP-400 engine. In the accident investigation the NTSB determined that the crankshaft failed due to metal fatigue. The crankshaft had 20 hours of flight time on it at the time of failure.

== Specifications (XP-400) ==
Data from Tacke and manufacturer

=== General characteristics ===
- Type: Four-cylinder, four-stroke aircraft engine
- Displacement: 400 cu in (6,555 cc)
- Length: 32.8 in (833 mm)
- Width: 34.3 in (871 mm)
- Height: 24.0 in (610 mm)
- Dry weight: 310 lb (140.6 kg)

=== Components ===
- Fuel type: gasoline
- Cooling system: air
- Reduction gear: none

=== Performance ===
- Power output: 180 hp (134 kW)
- Compression ratio: 8.9:1

== See also ==
Related lists

- List of aircraft engines
