= Brantly =

Brantly may refer to:

- Brantly International, American aviation manufacturer
- Brantly, given name
  - Brantly Womack, American scholar
- Brantly, surname
  - Keith Brantly, American long-distance runner
  - Rob Brantly, American baseball player
  - Justin Brantly, American football player
  - Kent Brantly, American physician and author
  - Newby O. Brantly, American inventor and entrepreneur
  - Susan Brantly, American scholar
  - Theodore Brantly, American jurist

== See also ==
- Brantley (disambiguation)
