= Brantly 305 =

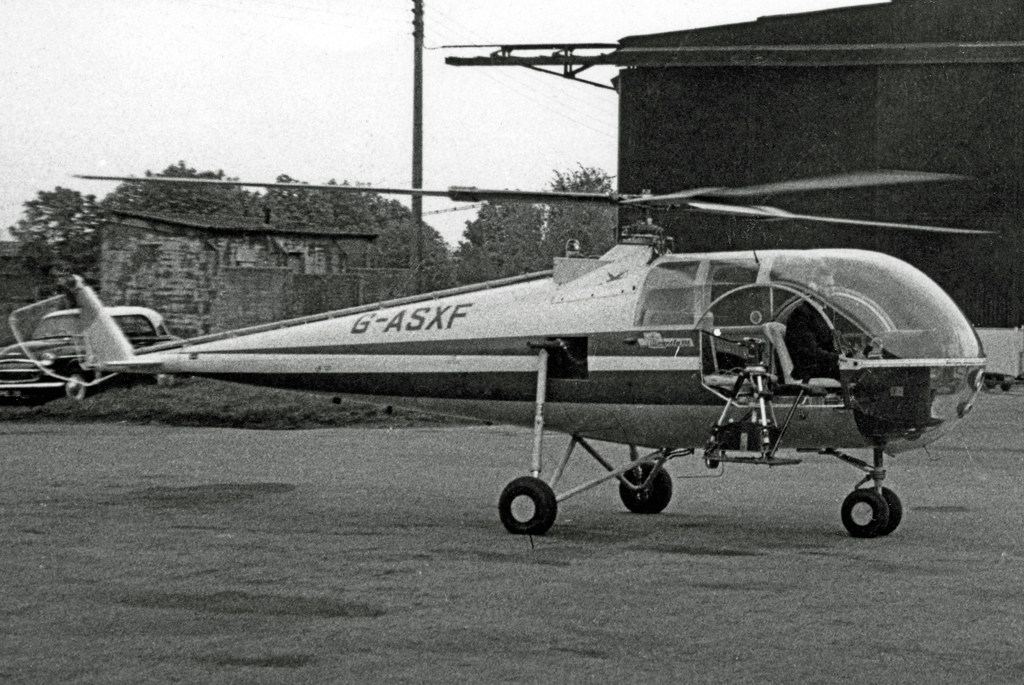
- Brantly 305 at Oxford Airport UK in 1966

General information
- Type: Light helicopter
- National origin: United States of America
- Manufacturer: Brantly Helicopter Corporation

History
- First flight: January 1964

The Brantly 305 is an American five-seat light helicopter of the 1960s. It is an enlarged version of the Brantly B-2 which was produced by the Brantly Helicopter Corporation.

== Design and development ==
The five-seater Model 305 helicopter is based on the smaller two-seat Brantly B-2 that was designed by Newby O. Brantly. The helicopter is powered by a Lycoming IVO-540 flat six piston engine. The enlarged cabin has room for five passengers, two side-by-side forward-facing seats and a bench seat at the rear for three passengers. The Model 305 first flew during January 1964 and FAA type approval was received 29 July 1965. 45 were built during the mid 60's by Brantly and Brantly-Hynes produced an improved version in 1985 of which 4 were built. The Brantly 305 suffered from a ground resonance problems. Hynes developed a more powerful and streamline version in 1993, none were produced.

== Specifications ==
Data from Jane's All The World's Aircraft 1976-77

General characteristics

- Crew: 1
- Capacity: 4 passengers
- Length: 32 ft 11 in (10.03 m) (overall length, rotors turning), 24 ft 5 in (7.44 m) (fuselage length)
- Height: 8 ft 0 1/8 in (2.442 m)
- Empty weight: 1,800 lb (816 kg)
- Max takeoff weight: 2,900 lb (1,315 kg)
- Fuel capacity: 43 US gal (36 imp gal; 160 L)
- Powerplant: 1 × Lycoming IVO-540-A1A air-cooled flat-six engine, 305 hp (227 kW)
- Main rotor diameter: 28 ft 8 in (8.74 m)
- Main rotor area: 35.8 sq ft (3.33 m^{2})

Performance

- Maximum speed: 120 mph (190 km/h, 100 kn) at sea level
- Cruise speed: 110 mph (180 km/h, 96 kn) at sea level
- Range: 220 mi (350 km, 190 nmi)
- Service ceiling: 12,000 ft (3,700 m)
- Rate of climb: 975 ft/min (4.95 m/s)

== See also ==
Related development

- Brantly B-2
