= Newport, Texas =

- Unincorporated community
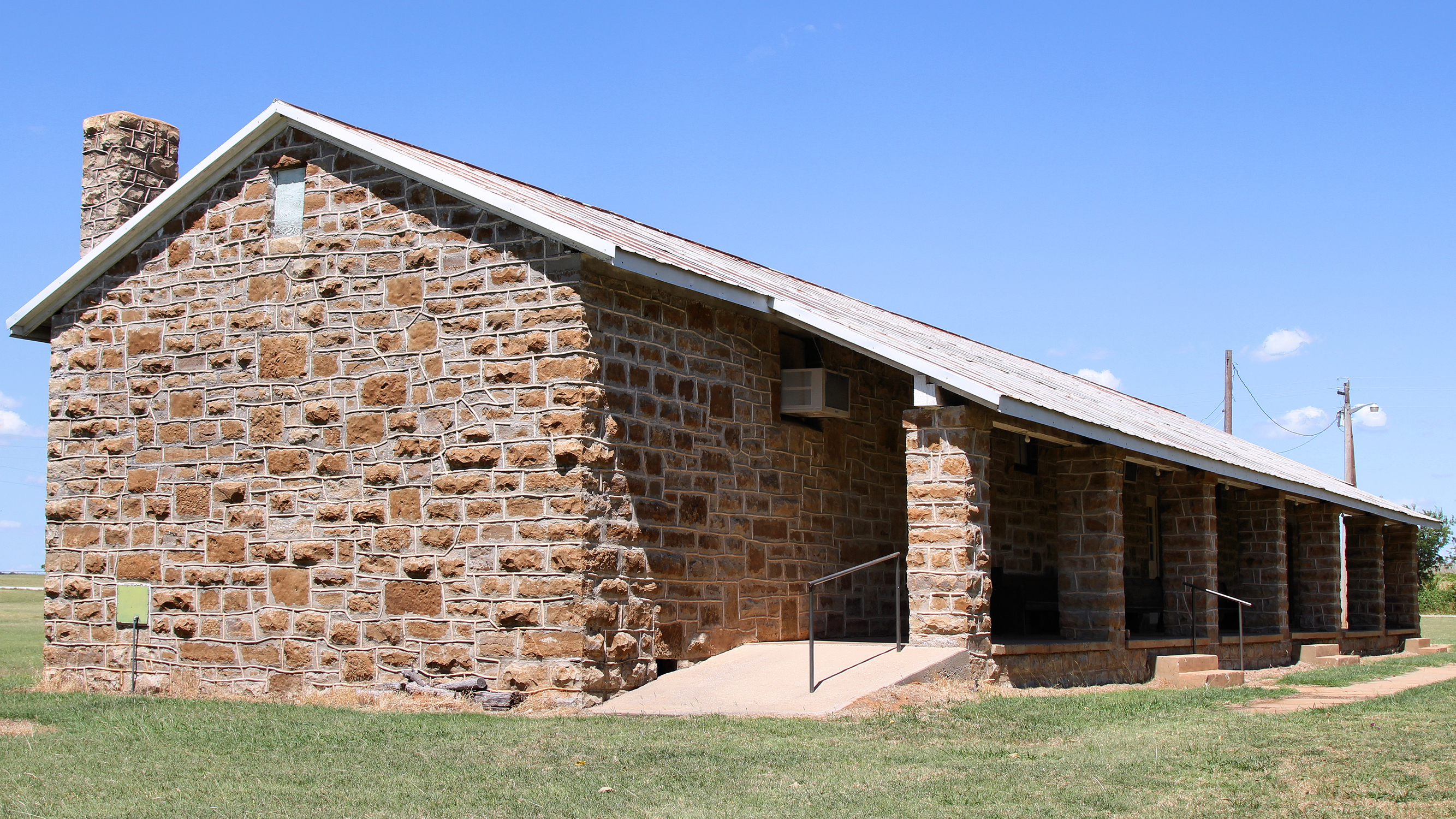
- The former school in Newport, Texas was built by the Works Progress Administration in 1939.

- Location within Texas Location within the United States
- Coordinates: 33°28′04″N 98°00′59″W
- Country: United States
- State: Texas
- County: Clay
- Elevation: 1,024 ft (312 m)
- Time zone: UTC-6 (Central (CST))
  - Summer (DST): UTC-5 (CDT)
- Area code: 940
- GNIS feature ID: 1363855

Newport is an unincorporated community in Clay and Jack counties in Texas, United States. According to the Handbook of Texas, the community had a population of 70 in 2000. It is located within the Wichita Falls metropolitan area.

== History ==
The community was first known as Bear Hill when L. Hancock founded it in 1872. After a post office opened there in 1878, the name was changed to Newport the following year. Newport is a word created by merging the initial letters of the surnames of seven prominent locals. Newport had 176 residents by 1900. By the middle of the 1920s, it had grown to 280, and it remained there until the mid-1940s, when twelve local enterprises began operations, and into the 1930s. The population had decreased to 85 by the middle of the 1950s, and there were just three companies. 70 people were projected to live in Newport between the 1960s and 2000. By 1990, Newport had grown into Jack County and had only one business listed.

On April 5–6, 1955, an F3 tornado hit the towns of Antelope, Shannon, and Newport, but did not cause any damage.

== Geography ==
Newport is located at the intersection of Farm to Market Roads 2127 and 1288 on Texas State Highway 59, 24 mi (39 km) southeast of Henrietta in extreme southeastern Clay County and northeastern Jack County.

== Education ==
Today, Newport is served by the Bowie Independent School District.

== Notable people ==
- John Coyle White served more than twenty-six years as the elected commissioner of the Texas Department of Agriculture. White was the chairman of the Democratic National Committee from 1978 to 1981.
- Felix G. Bransford, who served on the 20th Texas Legislature.
- Newby O. Brantly, founder of the Brantly Helicopter Corporation.
