= Qingdao Haili Helicopters =

Chinese aircraft manufacturer

- Founded: 2007
- Headquarters: Qingdao, China
- Owner: Shenzong Cheng
- Subsidiaries: Brantly International, Superior Aviation Beijing

Qingdao Haili Helicopters is a Chinese aircraft manufacturer. The organization was formed in 2007 to acquire the American helicopter company Brantly International, and manufacture the Brantly B-2 series of helicopters. The company later developed an unmanned version of the Brantly design developed with Weifang Tianxiang Aerospace Industry that was first flown in 2011. In 2011, Superior Aviation Beijing was merged with Brantley. In 2012, the company suspended production of the B2-B due to poor export sales.

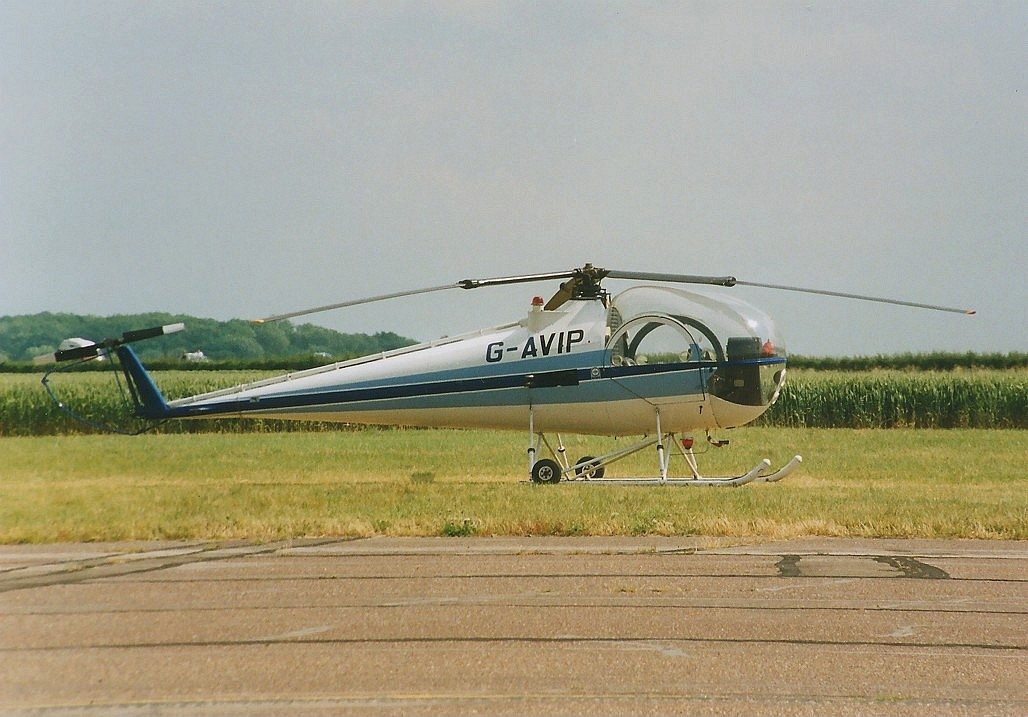
An example of the B2-B Helicopter

== Aircraft ==
Summary of aircraft built by Qingdao Haili Helicopters
Model name	First flight	Number built	Type
Brantly B-2			Helicopter
V750 UAV	2011	1	B-2 based Helicopter UAV
