= Wega 180 =

Brazilian amateur-built aircraft

General information
- Type: Amateur-built aircraft
- National origin: Brazil
- Manufacturer: Wega Aircraft
- Status: In production (2017)

History
- Introduction date: 2013

The Wega 180 is a Brazilian amateur-built aircraft designed and produced by Wega Aircraft (Wega Industria Aeronautica) of Palhoça, Santa Catarina, introduced at the Sun 'n Fun airshow in 2013. The aircraft is supplied as a kit for amateur construction or as a complete ready-to-fly-aircraft.

== Design and development ==
The aircraft features a cantilever low-wing, a two-seats-in-side-by-side configuration enclosed cockpit under a bubble canopy, retractable tricycle landing gear and a single engine in tractor configuration.

The aircraft is made from carbon fibre. Its 7.78 m (25.5 ft) span wing employs an NFL (1)-0215F airfoil at the wing root transitioning to a Wortmann FX-62-K-131 at the wing tip. The wing has an area of 9.06 m^{2} (97.5 sq ft) and mounts flaps. The wing is a separate structure and is attached to the fuselage with four bolts. The standard engines used are the 180 hp (134 kW) Superior XP-360 and the 180 hp (134 kW) Lycoming IO-360 four-stroke powerplants.

== Operational history ==
Reviewers Roy Beisswenger and Marino Boric described the design in a 2015 review as "a modern, two-place, high-performance aircraft...[with] aerobatic features and claims a high 300 km/h (190-knot) cruise speed in a comfortable, ergonomic cabin...the aircraft's clean design, together with the retractable gear, helps Wega to reach a max airspeed of 350 km/h".

== Specifications (Wega 180) ==
Data from Tacke and manufacturer

General characteristics

- Crew: one
- Capacity: one passenger
- Length: 6.556 m (21 ft 6 in)
- Wingspan: 7.86 m (25 ft 9 in)
- Height: 2.315 m (7 ft 7 in)
- Wing area: 9.06 m^{2} (97.5 sq ft)
- Airfoil: Wing root: NFL (1)-0215F, wing tip: Wortmann FX-62-K-131
- Empty weight: 550 kg (1,213 lb)
- Gross weight: 910 kg (2,006 lb)
- Fuel capacity: 214 litres (47 imp gal; 57 US gal)
- Powerplant: 1 × Superior XP-360 four cylinder, air-cooled, four stroke aircraft engine, 130 kW (180 hp)
- Propellers: 3-bladed constant speed propeller

Performance

- Maximum speed: 352 km/h (219 mph, 190 kn)
- Cruise speed: 306 km/h (190 mph, 165 kn)
- Stall speed: 102 km/h (63 mph, 55 kn) flaps down
- Range: 2,345 km (1,457 mi, 1,266 nmi)
- Service ceiling: 5,000 m (16,000 ft)
- g limits: +6/-4
- Maximum glide ratio: 15:1
- Rate of climb: 8 m/s (1,600 ft/min)
- Wing loading: 100.0 kg/m^{2} (20.5 lb/sq ft)

== See also ==
- List of aerobatic aircraft
