= Superior Air Parts =

Sailboat class

Superior Air Parts, Incorporated
- Company type: Private company
- Industry: Aerospace
- Founded: 1967
- Headquarters: Coppell, Texas, United States
- Key people: CEO: Keith Chatten
- Products: Aircraft engines and parts
- Owner: Superior Aviation Beijing
- Website: www.superiorairparts.com

Superior Air Parts, Inc. is a Chinese-owned manufacturer of aviation piston engine replacement parts, headquartered in Coppell, Texas, United States. The company has been owned by Superior Aviation Beijing since 2010.

== History ==
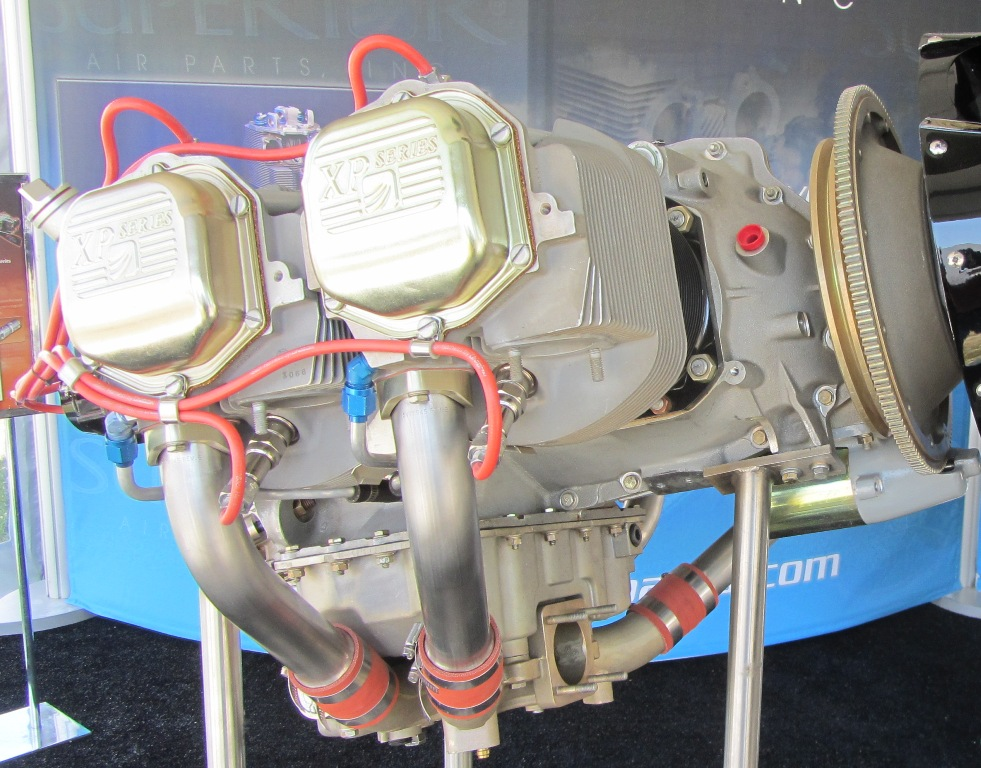
Superior XP-360 engine for homebuilt aircraft

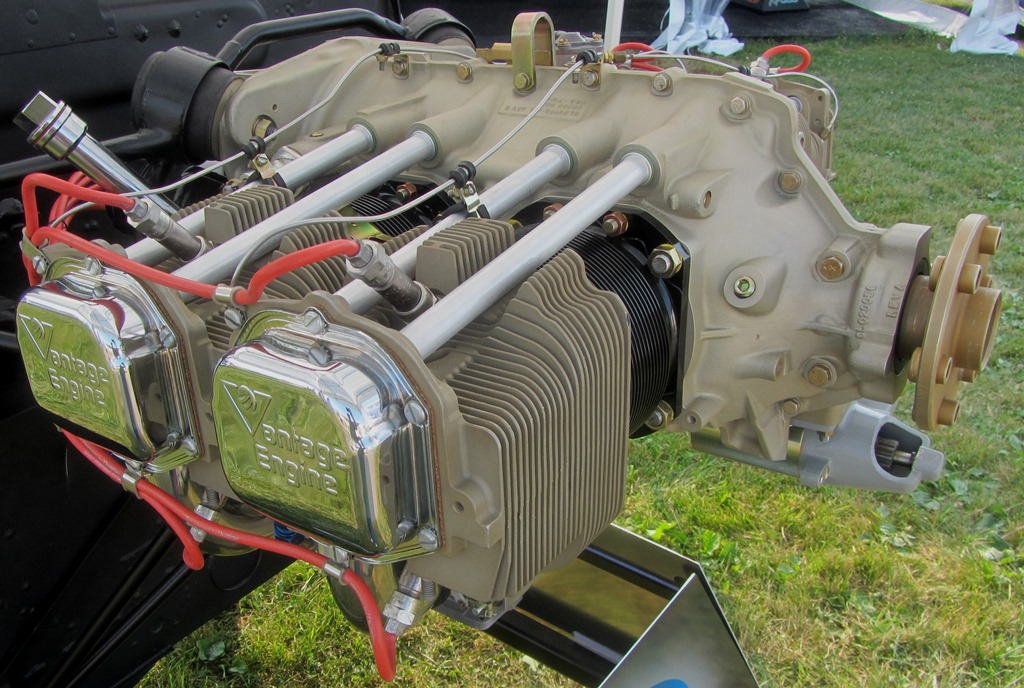
Superior Vantage type certified engine

Superior Air Parts started as a manufacturer of valve guides in 1967. The company branched out into FAA/PMA approved parts for general aviation aircraft. The company manufactures replacement parts for Lycoming and Continental aircraft engines. The cylinder assemblies use newer cylinder head alloys and fully hardened cylinder liners. Most of the company's production is outsourced, with Superior ensuring that the parts meet their engineering and testing standards.

The company was bought by the German engine manufacturer Thielert, in 2006. Thielert was seeking a parts distribution network in North America, as part of its effort to sell its Centurion diesel aircraft engine series. Thielert already had a business relationship with Superior, as it had been engaged in the production of Superior's after-market engine cylinders.

In 2008, Superior Air Parts' parent company Thielert declared bankruptcy, Superior itself filed for Chapter 11 bankruptcy on 31 December 2008 and laid off many of its staff. In August 2010, Superior was sold to Superior Aviation Beijing for US$7M. Superior Aviation Beijing is 60% owned by Superior Aviation Beijing Chairman Cheng Shenzong and 40% by Beijing E-Town, an economic development agency of Beijing's municipal government. Tim Archer, the former marketing and sales VP for Superior became the new CEO for the US subsidiary and oversaw the establishment of a piston engine production facility in Beijing.

At AirVenture 2012 CEO Tim Archer announced that the company was recovering from its bankruptcy and that the Chinese investment had been critical in that turn around. The company was at that time able to ship almost 90% of parts in its catalog and was training Chinese technicians in Vantage engine production for the Asian market.

In March 2019 the Superior Air Parts XP-400 and Superior Air Parts XP-382 engines were withdrawn from service and all customer engines were subject to a mandatory, immediate buy-back by the company to remove them from service. The company made this decision based on detonation problems found in some XP-400 engines that could not be resolved. Due to parts commonality, the decision was made to buy-back the XP-382 engines as well.

In February 2020, Superior settled a lawsuit regarding the 2016 fatal crash of a Van's Aircraft RV-8A for US$5M. The crash was due to the failure of the crankshaft in the installed XP-400 engine. In the accident investigation the NTSB determined that the crankshaft failed due to metal fatigue. The crankshaft had 20 hours of flight time on it at the time of failure.

== Products ==
The company has developed a series of non-certified engines for light-sport aircraft and homebuilt aircraft, including the 160 hp (119 kW) XP-320, 180 hp (134 kW) XP-360, 200 hp (149 kW) XP-382 and the 215 hp (160 kW) XP-400. A line of diesel engines is under development, including the 100 hp (75 kW) Gemini Diesel 100 and 125 hp (93 kW) Gemini Diesel 125.

The XP-360 was developed into a certified engine design, the Superior O-360, marketed as the Vantage and certified in 2004.

== Engines ==
Summary of engines built by Superior Air Parts
Model name	First run	Number built	Type
Superior Air Parts Vantage			Type certified, four cylinder, horizontally opposed, air-cooled aircraft engine
Superior Air Parts XP-320			Four cylinder, horizontally opposed, air-cooled aircraft engine
Superior Air Parts XP-360			Four cylinder, horizontally opposed, air-cooled aircraft engine
Superior Air Parts XP-382			Four cylinder, horizontally opposed, air-cooled aircraft engine
Superior Air Parts XP-400			Four cylinder, horizontally opposed, air-cooled aircraft engine
Superior Air Parts Gemini Diesel 100			Three cylinder, liquid-cooled diesel aircraft engine
Superior Air Parts Gemini Diesel 125			Three cylinder, liquid-cooled diesel aircraft engine
