= Los Angeles Fashion Week =

Fashion industry event

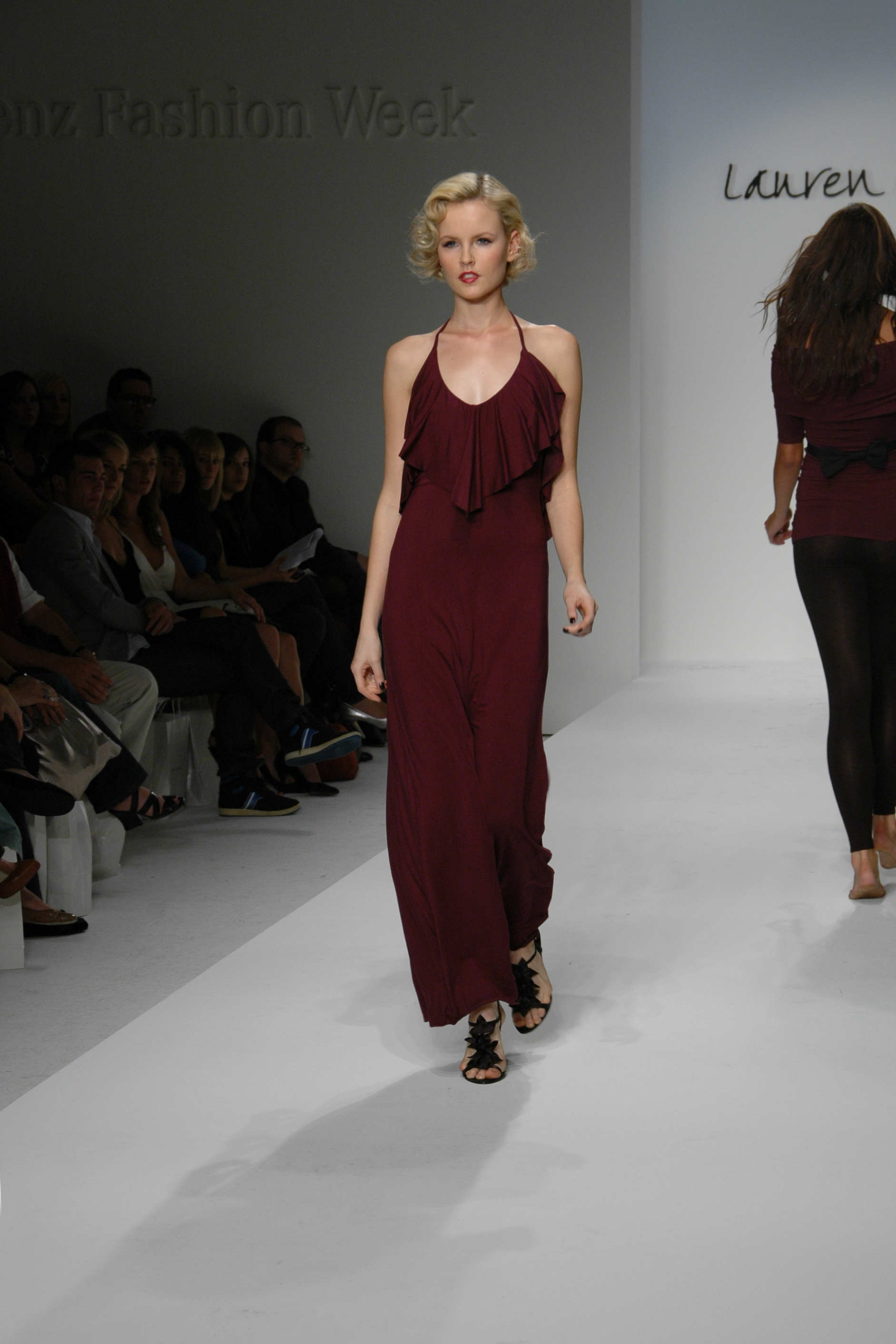
Los Angeles Fashion Week at Smashbox Studios, Culver City, CA 03/11/2008

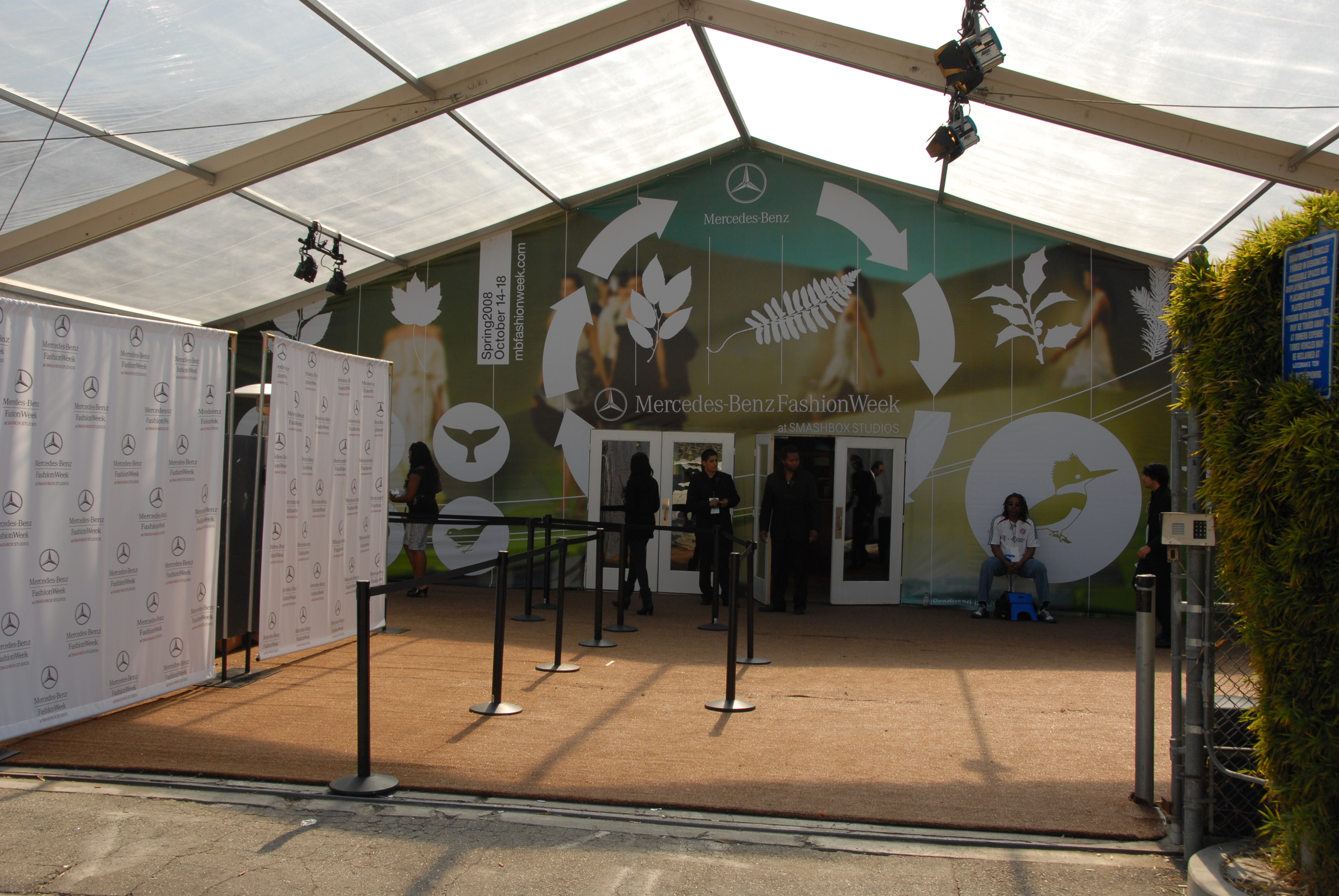
Mercedes Benz Fashion Week 2008

Los Angeles Fashion Week (LAFW) is a fashion week that occurs biannually in Los Angeles, California. Multiple show producers hold events throughout the Greater Los Angeles area each March and October. Traditionally, the City of Los Angeles identified the third weekend of those respective months as the beginning of its Fashion Week. However, new independent event producers have been transitioning Fashion Week related activities to coincide closer in time with the LA Fashion Market Week.

== History ==
Los Angeles Fashion Week was created as a West Coast alternative to New York Fashion Week, originally Press Week, which was created by Eleanor Lambert in 1953. Independently produced events, working alongside designers began inviting fashion journalists to see collections from Southern California. Since the late 1990s, Fashion Week has been represented by a community of L.A. fashion producers, designers, journalists, and marketers interested in its success.

In 2002, IMG's fashion division, which produces Mercedes-Benz Fashion Week in New York, made its first foray west, with Mercedes-Benz Shows LA in downtown Los Angeles at The Standard hotel. Simultaneously, Davis Factor and Dean Factor produced Smashbox Fashion Week Los Angeles at Smashbox Studios in Culver City. Dozens of designers showed their collections to journalists, celebrities, family and friends at these two centralized venues, while others still chose to show their collections in unique off site venues such as nightclubs, private estates, train stations, churches and lofts. In 2003, IMG and Smashbox united under one banner to streamline services and venues, choosing the Factor-owned Smashbox Studios Culver City location over downtown Los Angeles venues. The relationship between IMG and Smashbox Studios lasted for five years, with the October 2008 shows marking their final presentation together.

In October 2005, the now-defunct LA Fashion Awards debuted to celebrate and honor the very best of California fashion. The annual Awards were timed at the closing of Fashion Week and the opening of Market Week in October, at the service of both retail store buyers and press. A nominating committee of more than forty of LA's top fashion journalists, merchandisers, stylists, designers and marketplace experts participate in the selection process. Among past winners are educator Rosemary Brantley; retailers Ron Herman, Fred Segal, Cameron Silver and Christos Garkinos; designers Trina Turk, Monique Lhuillier and Max Azria; fashion innovators Nony Tochterman of Petro Zillia, Rozae Nichols and Juan Carlos Obando; journalist Rose Apodaca; stylist Arianne Phillips; web publisher DailyCandy; event producer Gen Art; brands American Apparel, Volcom, J Brand, Bebe, Guess; and the television show Project Runway. The program was produced by LA Fashion Awards, LLC, which was co-founded by fashion industry veterans Jennifer Uner and Mary Hill with the support of several visionary sponsors and the endorsement of local fashion industry non-profit organizations California Fashion Association, Fashion Group International of Los Angeles, Fashion Business Incorporated, the Fashion District BID, and also the Los Angeles County Economic Development Corporation. The Awards were placed on hiatus in October 2008 after sponsorship support was put on hold in the wake of the financial market meltdown that September.

In February 2007, artist Peter Gurnz, developer Gary Warfel, and downtown resident Brady Westwater – all members of the Downtown Los Angeles Neighborhood Council (DLANC) – created an alternative Fashion Week venue in Downtown Los Angeles, It was produced by a local arts organization, BOXeight, founded by artist/designer Peter Gurnz. In Spring 2007, after just six weeks of preparation, BOXeight Fashion Week had its first show at the Los Angeles Theater. In Fall 2007, it moved to Vibiana LA, the newly restored Cathedral of Saint Vibiana. In 2008, it moved again, this time eastward to BOXeight's headquarters on the fringe of downtown's warehouse district, which added further patina to its independent street credibility.

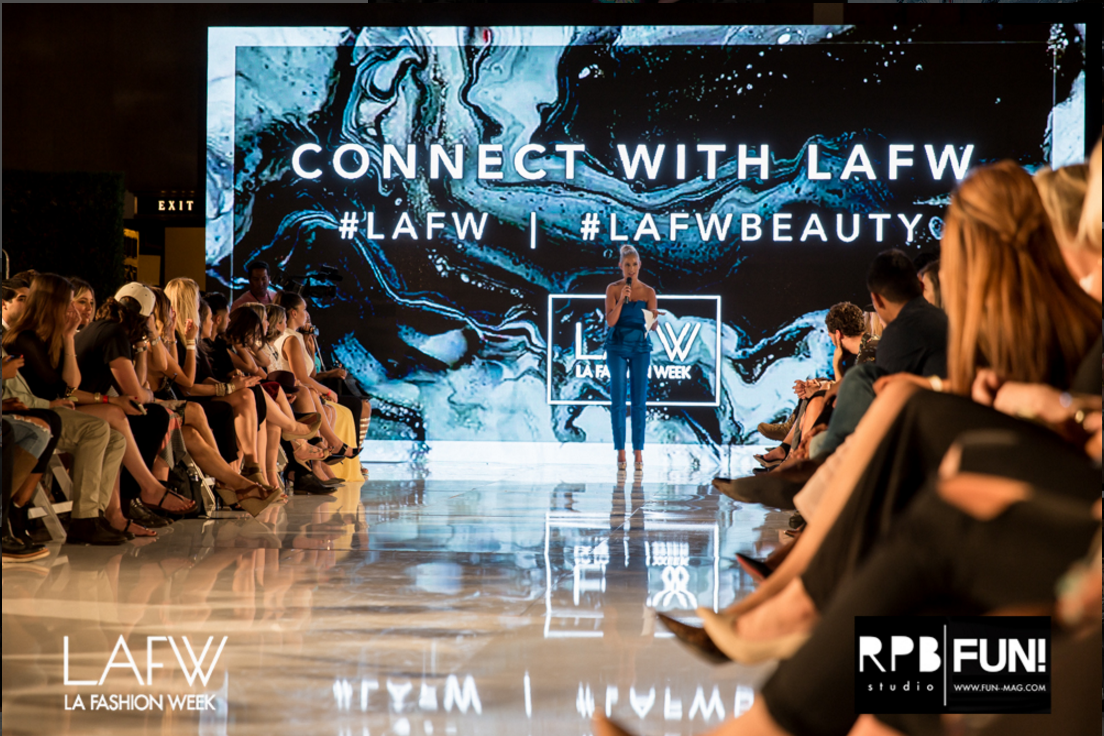
LA Fashion Week (LAFW) Spring/Summer 2016

In October 2007, City of Los Angeles Mayor Antonio Villaraigosa recognized the contributions of the fashion industry with a compelling speech at the opening of the LA Fashion Awards and visited the Designers & Agents trade show and the wholesale showrooms at the Cooper Design Space, New Mart and California Market Center. Early in 2008, the mayor's office briefly formed a committee to better harness and organize the energies of the loose consortium that has worked diligently to improve the reputation of Los Angeles as a fashion capital and the bottom lines of the businesses operating there.

Los Angeles' Fashion Week has traditionally been characterized by the diversity of independent productions operating throughout the metro area.

== Multiple producers are covered in the press as "LA Fashion Week" ==
The term "LA Fashion Week" dates at least as far back as 2001.

As a result, several productions are included in roundups of "LA Fashion Week" coverage, in press outlets such as the LA Times and WWD.

According to the LA Times: "Fashion Week (or more accurately weeks) in Los Angeles occurs each spring and fall with multiple organizations (currently including Art Hearts Fashion, L.A. Fashion Week and Style Fashion Week) holding events throughout greater Los Angeles shortly after the twice-yearly Paris women’s ready-to-wear shows have wrapped."

== Trademark and Revolving "Official" Status ==
In 2015, a Canadian named Arthur Chipman produced the first shows under the trademark for "LA Fashion Week", now located at LAFW.net, according to the Los Angeles Times.

The press release stated the events had returned from 2008, although the trademark was acquired in 2015:

"“Although the ‘official’ LA Fashion Week has been on hiatus since 2008, we are back in full force!”"

However, according to the LA Times: "Those who follow these things as closely as we do may recognize 2008 as the year the wheels came off the partnership between Smashbox Studios in Culver City and NYC-based event producer IMG ending the closest thing L.A. had to a unified fashion week. But to the best of our recollection, neither that group nor any of the smaller efforts that unspooled that year claimed to be an “official” fashion week. And to be honest, we're not even sure what that designation exactly means."

Previously, Style Fashion Week was declared the "official" LA Fashion Week by Mayor Eric Garcetti. Subsequently, LA Fashion Week was declared the "official fashion week of Los Angeles" by Garcetti according to Racked.

LAFW.net's first show was held in Los Angeles in 2015 according to the Los Angeles Times.

However, various productions are included in the press in roundups of "LA Fashion Week."

== Attendance ==
Fashion week events are notorious for being exclusive to designers, social media influencers, and celebrities. Los Angeles fashion week has some shows available for the general public, but also counts with shows that are invitation only.

== See also ==
- List of fashion events
