= Brantly B-2 =

1953 utility helicopter family by Brantly International

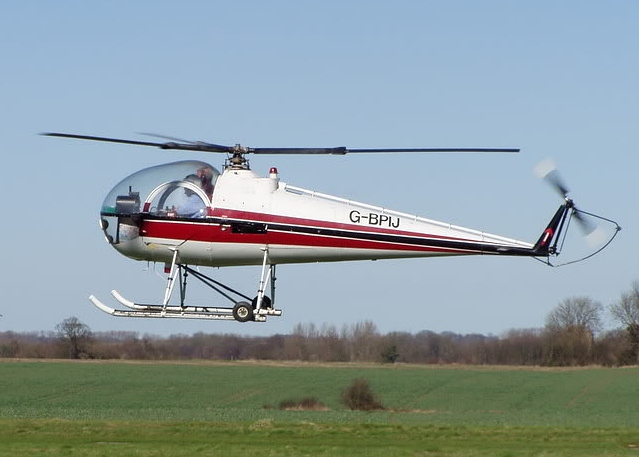
- Brantly B2 in a hover

General information
- Type: Light Helicopter
- Manufacturer: Brantly Helicopter Corporation
- Designer: Newby O. Brantly
- Status: In production (2011)
- Number built: 334

History
- Introduction date: 1958
- First flight: 21 February 1953

The Brantly B-2 is an American two-seat light helicopter produced by the Brantly Helicopter Corporation.

== Design and development ==
After the failure of his first design, the Brantly B-1, Newby O. Brantly decided to design a simpler and less complicated helicopter for the private buyer. The B-2 had a single main rotor and an anti-torque tail rotor and first flew on 21 February 1953. This was followed by an improved second prototype that first flew on 14 August 1956.

The B-2A was introduced with a modified cabin, and the B-2B had a larger 180 hp fuel-injected engine. The B-2B has a three-bladed articulated main rotor and an all-metal fuselage, it can be operated with skid, wheel or float landing gear. The piston engine is fitted vertically in the fuselage behind the cabin.

== Operational history ==
The basic design has remained in production for over 50 years. The United States Army ordered five B-2s (designated the YHO-3) to be evaluated in the Light Observation Helicopter competition in 1958, although it lost the bid, the Army operated the H-5T unmanned variant as target from 1986. Introduced in the early 1970s, an improved larger version with five seats was designated the Brantly 305.

== Variants ==
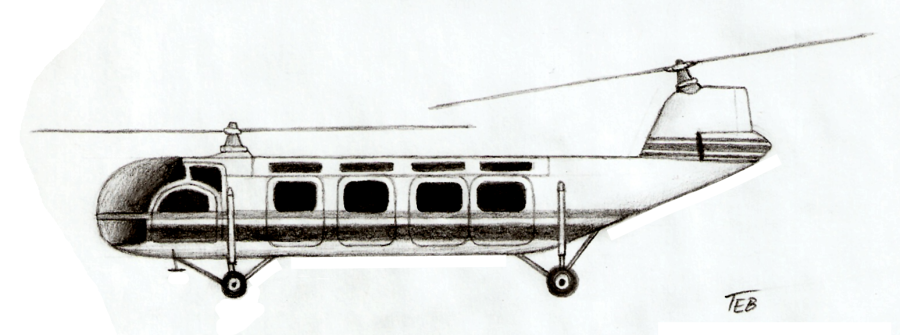
The unbuilt Brantly B2J10 10-seat transport helicopter. Was to be powered by two Allison 250-C18 or two Boeing 550-1-12C engines.

- Brantly B-2: Two-seat single-engined light utility helicopter.
  - Brantly YHO-3: United States military designation for the B2.
- Brantly B-2A: Initial production version.
- Brantly B-2B: Improved version, fitted with new metal rotor blades, and an uprated fuel-injected 180 hp Lycoming piston engine.
- Brantly 305: Larger five-seat version.
- H-2: Designation of the B-2B built by Brantly-Hynes between 1976 and 1979.
- Brantly B-2J10: Projected tandem-rotor version with longer and wider fuselage for carrying passengers and/or cargo. Unbuilt.
- V750 UAV: An UAV version developed by Qingdao Haili Helicopters Co. Ltd., a joint venture between Brantly International Inc, Qingdao Wenquan International Aviation Investment Co., Ltd, and Qingdao Brantly Investment Consultation Co., Ltd. Maiden flight was completed on May 7, 2011, and received an order from an unnamed customer

== Accidents and incidents ==
The B-2 has had 21 fatal accidents between February 1964 and August 2009.

== Surviving aircraft ==
- B-2 N2143U was purchased in 1962 and flown by Dean Svec for all of its total of 2,108 hrs. It was retired in 2006 and is now on permanent public display at the Crawford Auto-Aviation Museum, Western Reserve Historical Society in Cleveland, Ohio.

A B2B belonging to the Flying Gyrocopter and Old Aircraft museum at Midden-Zeeland, Netherlands was reportedly about to fly again November 2009.

A Greek road-assistance company named Express Service based in Thessaloniki operated a B2B Brantly-Hynes helicopter for several years. That helicopter started flying in 1978 and had the Greek registration number SX-AHH. First captain was the pilot Kaltekis Spyridon.

B2 sn#18 is in Chino awaiting restoration after the 2005/2010 floods at Corona airport, a month underwater did little corrosive damage..., a B2B acquired for spares to complete restoration (dual serial numbers found "spliced together bird")

== Specifications (B-2B with skid landing gear) ==
Data from Jane's All the World's Aircraft 1976–77.

General characteristics

- Crew: 2
- Length: 21 ft 9 in (6.63 m)
- Height: 6 ft 9 in (2.06 m)
- Empty weight: 1,020 lb (463 kg)
- Max takeoff weight: 1,670 lb (757 kg)
- Fuel capacity: 31 US gal (26 imp gal; 120 L)
- Powerplant: 1 × Avco Lycoming IVO-360-A1A air-cooled flat-four engine, 180 hp (130 kW)
- Main rotor diameter: 23 ft 9 in (7.24 m)
- Main rotor area: 442 sq ft (41.1 m^{2})

Performance

- Maximum speed: 100 mph (160 km/h, 87 kn) at sea level
- Cruise speed: 90 mph (140 km/h, 78 kn) (75% power)
- Range: 250 mi (400 km, 220 nmi)
- Service ceiling: 10,800 ft (3,300 m)
- Rate of climb: 1,900 ft/min (9.7 m/s)

== See also ==
Related lists

- List of military aircraft of the United States

== Bibliography ==
- "Aircraft Production List: 5: The Brantly B-2: Part One". Archive. No. 4. Air-Britain. 1990. pp. 91–92. ISSN 0262-4923.
- Bridgman, Leonard; Taylor, John W. R., eds. (1958). Jane's All the World's Aircraft 1958–59. London: Sampson Low, Marston & Company. Ltd.
- Elliott, Bryn (January–February 1999). "On the Beat: The First 60 Years of Britain's Air Police". Air Enthusiast. No. 79. pp. 68–75. ISSN 0143-5450.
- Elliott, Bryn (May–June 1999). "On the Beat: The First 60 Years of Britain's Air Police, Part Two". Air Enthusiast. No. 81. pp. 64–69. ISSN 0143-5450.
- Frawley, Gerard. The International Directory of Civil Aircraft. Aerospace Publications Pty Ltd, 1997. ISBN 1-875671-26-9.
- Harding, Stephen (1990). U.S Army Aircraft since 1947. Shrewsbury, UK: Airlife. ISBN 1-85310-102-8.
- Taylor, John W. R., ed. (1976). Jane's All the World's Aircraft 1976–77. London: Jane's Yearbooks. ISBN 0-354-00538-3.
