= Brankley =

Brankley may refer to:

- Tammy Brankley Mulchi
- Brankley Pastures

== See also ==
- Brantley (disambiguation)
