= Brantly B-1 =

General information
- Type: light coaxial-rotor helicopter
- Manufacturer: Brantly Helicopter Corporation
- Designer: Newby O. Brantly
- Status: abandoned

History
- First flight: 1946

The Brantly B-1 was a 2-seat, coaxial-rotor helicopter designed by Newby O. Brantly and constructed by the Pennsylvania Elastic Company, Brantly's employer.

== Design and development ==
In 1946, Brantly started flight testing the B-1 prototype (NX69125), which used a 150 hp Franklin O-335 engine in the fabric fuselage and two three-bladed rotors that rotated at 320 rpm and were fitted coaxially. The collective, cyclic, and differential controls were enclosed in the rotor hubs and ran in an oil-bath. Each rotor blade weighed 5.5 kilos. It also had a fixed wheel undercarriage with a tailwheel under the tailfin.

Unfortunately, the design was too heavy and complex and was abandoned.

== Specifications ==
Data from

General characteristics

- Crew: 1
- Capacity: 1
- Length: 17 ft 6 in (5.33 m)
- Height: 7 ft 9 in (2.36 m)
- Empty weight: 1,325 lb (601 kg)
- Gross weight: 2,000 lb (907 kg)
- Powerplant: 1 × Franklin O-335 6-cyl. air-cooled horizontally=opposed piston engine, 150 hp (110 kW)
- Main rotor diameter: × 29 ft 6 in (9 m)

Performance

- Cruise speed: 113 mph (182 km/h, 98 kn)
- Range: 400 mi (640 km, 350 nmi)
