= Tempo Group =

Tempo Group is a Chinese auto parts supplier in brakes, shocks, control arms and other automotive chassis parts and components. Its main manufacturing operations are in China. The company has also operated since the late 1990s in North America where it maintains a sales presence and has an equity stake of 24% in the former chassis business of Delphi Automotive.

== Acquisitions ==
In 2009 it participated in a consortium that included the government of the Fangshan District of Beijing and Shougang Corporation to acquire the bankrupt chassis and brakes business of Delphi Automotive.

Later it participated in another consortium with E-Town, an economic development agency of Beijing, to acquire Nexteer from General Motors for $450 million.
