= Superior Air Parts XP-360 =

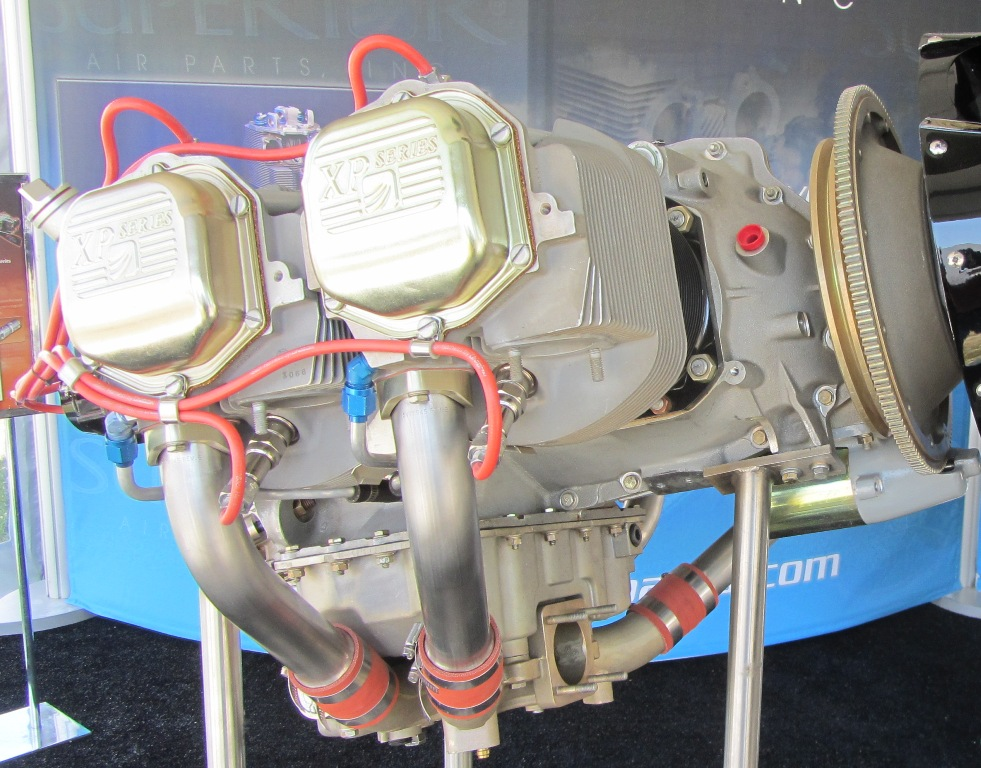
- Type: Aircraft engine
- National origin: United States
- Manufacturer: Superior Air Parts

The Superior Air Parts XP-360 is an aircraft engine, designed and produced by Superior Air Parts of Coppell, Texas, United States for use in homebuilt aircraft.

The company is owned by the Chinese company Superior Aviation Beijing, which is 60% owned by Chairman Cheng Shenzong and 40% owned by Beijing E-Town, an economic development agency of the municipal government of Beijing.

== Design and development ==
The engine is a four-cylinder four-stroke, horizontally-opposed, 360 cu in (5,899 cc) displacement, air-cooled, direct-drive, gasoline engine design. It produces 180 hp (134 kW) standard, although 170 hp (127 kW) and 195 hp (145 kW) versions are available. It is available in carburetor and fuel injected versions.

The engine is not type certified and is therefore intended for homebuilt aircraft.

== Specifications (XP-360) ==
Data from Tacke and manufacturer

=== General characteristics ===
- Type: Four-cylinder, four-stroke aircraft engine
- Displacement: 360 cu in (5,899.3 cc)
- Length: 32.8 in (833 mm)
- Width: 33.4 in (848 mm)
- Height: 24.6 in (625 mm)
- Dry weight: 288 to 297 lb (130.6 to 134.7 kg) depending on configuration

=== Components ===
- Fuel type: gasoline
- Cooling system: air
- Reduction gear: none

=== Performance ===
- Power output: 180 hp (134 kW)
- Compression ratio: 8.5:1

== See also ==
Related lists

- List of aircraft engines
