= Jennifer Brantley =

American singer-songwriter

Jennifer Brantley is a country and Americana singer/songwriter in Nashville, TN.

In 2009, Brantley performed a duet called, "Heart of Stone" with former RCA recording artist Razzy Bailey on his CD titled, "Damn Good Time." The CD also contains duets with Johnny Cash and Mickey Gilley. Brantley also appeared with Razzy on Ernest Tubb's Midnite Jamboree, which is broadcast from "The Air Castle of the South" WSM (AM), "Home of the Grand Ole Opry."

In 2007, Brantley was also nominated for Americana Female Singer/songwriter of the Year for the Los Angeles Music Awards.

Brantley is a cast member of the "Nashville Traditions" radio show that is set to air on WSM 650AM, which will reach 38 states in the United States and parts of Canada. The premier show aired Dec 10, 2010.
