= Rosemary Brantley =

American fashion designer

Rosemary Brantley is an American fashion designer and educator. She is the chair of the fashion design department of Otis College of Art and Design, since 1980. She is also co-founding member of her own sportsware company, Staples.

== Biography ==
Brantley's career began in Dallas, Texas, where she worked both as a fashion model and as an assistant in the fashion office of Neiman Marcus. There she met designer Stan Herman, who at the time taught at Parsons School of Design in New York City, and later became President of the Council of Fashion Designers of America (CFDA). Impressing Herman with her sense of style and design, Rosemary was accepted to attend Parsons on his recommendation. When Rosemary graduated from Parsons in 1973, she was named "Designer of the Year."

During the 1970s Rosemary worked for various companies in London as a designer, illustrator, and merchandiser, eventually becoming head designer of the Jaeger American Collection, prior to returning to New York City to work for Kasper Joan Leslie.

Brantley moved to Los Angeles in 1980 to accept an appointment as Department Chair of Otis' new Fashion Design program. Under her leadership, the department grew to become one of largest and most influential fashion programs in the country, providing design talent to some of the largest U.S. apparel companies and most recognized labels. Otis' Fashion Design program enjoys an international reputation, hosting an annual lineup of designers who directly mentor students, such as Isabel Toledo, Bob Mackie, Francisco Costa, Todd Oldham, and Cynthia Rowley. Todd Oldham has said "I have led critiques at many fashion design schools and by far Otis is the leader. In 2005, Brantley was recognized for her significant contributions to the fashion industry by the LA Fashion Awards with their "Inspiration Award." Student work under their mentorships is showcased each year at the Otis Scholarship Benefit and Fashion Show. The event has since been staged at the Beverly Hilton Hotel in Beverly Hills, garnering critical attention from the Los Angeles Times, Women's Wear Daily, and Apparel News.
