= Brantly International =

American helicopter manufacturing company

- Industry: Aerospace
- Founded: 1945
- Founder: Newby O. Brantly
- Headquarters: Coppell, Texas
- Key people: Cheng Shenzong (President)
- Products: Helicopters
- Number of employees: 20
- Parent: Lear Jet (1966–1969)

Brantly International Inc. is an American helicopter company with its engineering and administrative offices based Coppell, Texas, United States. Manufacturing of Brantly-designed helicopters is now carried out by Qingdao Haili Helicopters of China.

== History ==
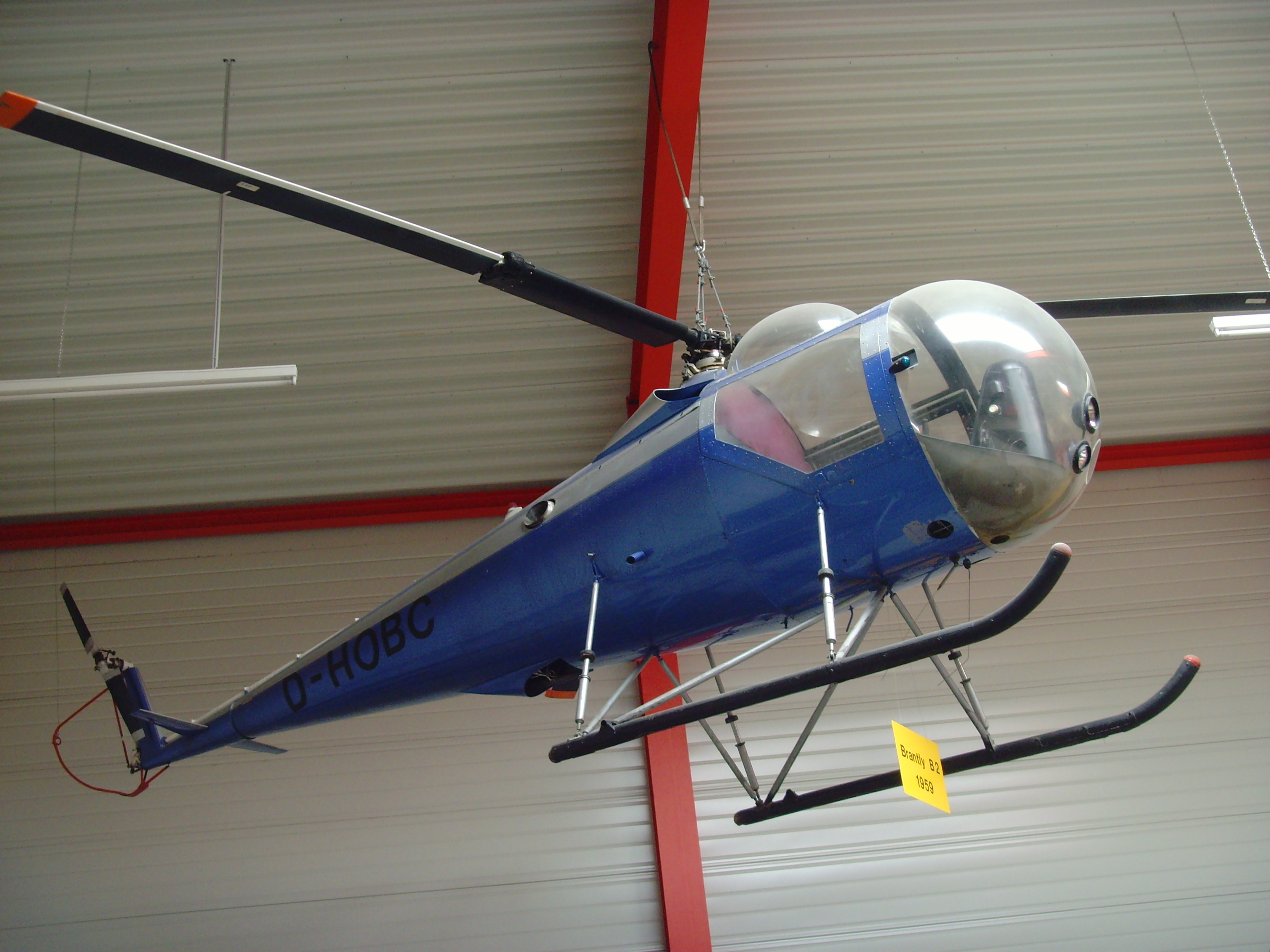
A Brantly B.2 on display at the Flugausstellung Hermeskeil

=== Brantly Helicopter ===
The company started out 1945 as Brantly Helicopter Corporation in Philadelphia, Pennsylvania, founded by Newby O. Brantly. Brantly was so impressed with the Sikorsky VS-300 that he decided to design his own helicopter. In 1946 his first helicopter, the Brantly B-1 with coaxial rotors made its first flight. The B-1 was not put into production.

Using lessons learned from the B-1, he decided to build a two-seater with a simple rotor design. This helicopter, the Brantly B-2, made its first flight 1953. In 1957 the company moved to Frederick, Oklahoma, where the B-2 was certified in 1959. He later designed the Brantly 305, a five-seater which made its first flight 1964. It was certified by the FAA in 1965, the same year it entered production.

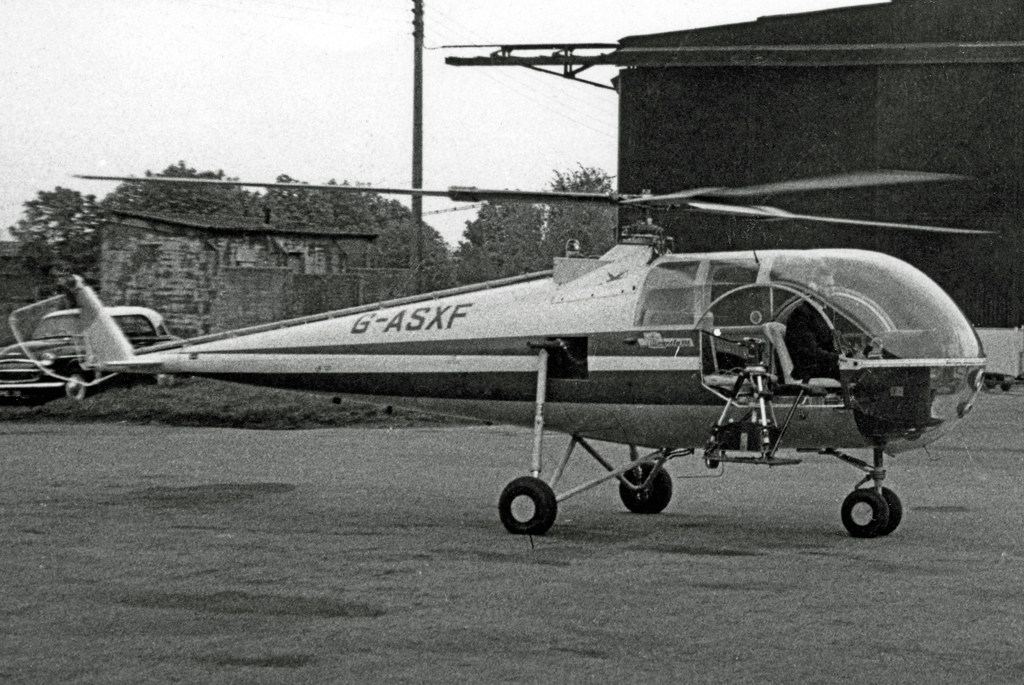
A Brantly 305 at Kidlington Airport

Lear Jet acquired the Brantly Helicopter Corporation in 1966; at this time the 180,000 sq ft (17,000 m^{2}) factory in Frederick, Oklahoma had 100 employees. The factory moved to Wichita, Kansas in 1969. Aeronautical Research & Development Corporation (ARDC) bought all the rights to Brantly helicopters from Lear Jet in 1969, but they ended operations in early 1970.

=== Brantly-Hynes ===
In 1972, the rights were acquired as Brantly Operators Inc. by Michael K. Hynes. He renamed the company in 1975 as Brantly-Hynes Helicopter Inc. Later that year, the Franklin Capital Corp, headed by F. Lee Bailey who also owned Enstrom Helicopter Corporation at that time, purchased the company. Brantly-Hynes originally were just providing product support but later placed the B-2 and 305 back into production.

=== Brantly International ===
The new factory in Vernon was built 1989 by Japanese-American businessman James T. Kimura, who renamed the company as Brantly International. In 1994, the ownership was transferred to a Beijing-based company, FESCO. In 1996, they achieved an FAA production certificate. In 2007, Cheng Shenzong, referred to as the "helicopter king" in China, acquired a major interest in the company, and a joint venture between Brantly International Inc, Qingdao Wenquan International Aviation Investment Co., Ltd, and Qingdao Brantly Investment Consultation Co., Ltd. was established.

The factory at the Wilbarger County Airport closed at the end of 2010, and engineering and administrative offices of Brantly moved to Coppell, Texas. Not many helicopters were sold in the last years of manufacturing in Texas. The Aerospace Industries Association (AIA) statistic for US Civil Helicopter Shipments between 1981 and 2007 showed 12 delivered B-2Bs.

Qingdao Haili Helicopters Co. Ltd. is now the only manufacturer of the B-2B helicopter.

== Products ==
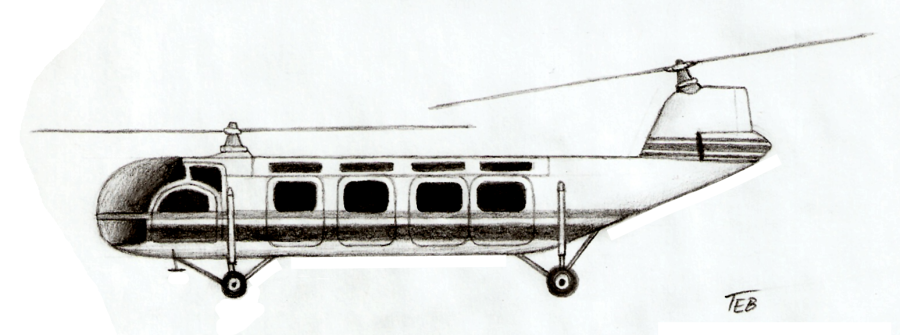
Brantly B-2J10 tandem-rotor

- 1946 - Brantly B-1
- 1953 - Brantly B-2: pre-production version.
  - Brantly B-2A: basic production version.
  - Brantly B-2B: improved version of the B-2, fitted with new metal rotor blades and an uprated fuel-injected 180 hp Lycoming piston engine. This is the only version currently available.
  - Brantly B-2J10: projected tandem-rotor version with longer and wider fuselage for carrying passengers and/or cargo. None built.
- 1964 – Brantly 305: an enlarged B-2.
