= Newby O. Brantly =

Newby Odell Brantly
- Born: April 13, 1905; Newport, Texas
- Died: July 19, 1993 (aged 88); Frederick, Oklahoma
- Known for: Brantly Helicopter Corporation

Newby Odell Brantly (April 13, 1905 – July 19, 1993) was an American inventor, engineer and entrepreneur who founded the Brantly Helicopter Corporation.

== Life ==
Born in Newport, Texas, Newby Brantly was the son of William Franklin and Ida Mae Brantly. He married Emma Dean Armstrong in 1932. After she died in 1968, he married Virginia Beth Hackler in 1969 and they had a daughter, Lynne Susan. The National Pilots Association named him 1961 "Pilot of the Year".

His inventions, amongst others, were a knitting machine for Penn Elastic Company (US-Patent 2067900 of 1935), a pumpjack (US-Patent 4534168 of 1983), a brassiere for female athletes (U.S. Pat. No. 3,665,929 issued on May 30, 1972) and a backhoe loader for tractors.

As an entrepreneur he founded Brantly Helicopter, the Brantly Manufacturing Company and 1968 Frybrant in Frederick, Oklahoma.

Brantly died in Frederick, Oklahoma, age 88 years.
