= Superior Aviation Beijing =

Chinese aircraft manufacturer

Superior Aviation Beijing Co. Ltd.
- Industry: Aerospace
- Founded: 2010
- Headquarters: Beijing, China
- Key people: Chairman Cheng Shenzong
- Subsidiaries: Superior Air Parts, Brantly International, Qingdao Brantly Investment Group, Weifang Freesky Aviation Industry, Qingdao Haili Helicopter Manufacturing

Superior Aviation Beijing is a Chinese aircraft manufacturer.

Superior was initially formed as Qingdao Haili Helicopter Co and Qingdao Brantly Investment Group, a private venture that purchased the Brantly International rights and tooling to manufacture a UAV in China.

Superior Aviation was formed in 2010 with the purchase of the American aircraft part manufacturer, Superior Air Parts. It is 60% owned by Chairman Cheng Shenzong, and 40% owned by Beijing E-Town International Investment & Development Co., Ltd., an economic development agency of the Beijing municipal government.

In July 2012, Superior entered a contract to take over the assets of Hawker Beechcraft pending approval. The deal did not include the Hawker Beechcraft Defense Company subsidiary. On 18 October 2012 multiple sources reported that the negotiations for the takeover had failed. Euan Rocha and Stuart Grudgings writing for Reuters reported that the CEO of Hawker Beechcraft, Steve Miller, had attributed the failure to "China-bashing by U.S. presidential candidates may have contributed to failure of the talks" although an article in that Wall Street Journal pointed to other reasons for the failure of the negotiations, including national security concerns as "the company's defense operations were integrated with its civilian businesses that proved difficult to untangle", and legal complications, as "advisers in the U.S. had trouble negotiating with Chinese representatives unfamiliar with U.S. finance and bankruptcy law." A press release from Hawker Beechcraft ascribing the failure to the fact that, "the proposed transaction with Superior could not be completed on terms acceptable to the company." Textron Aviation eventually bought Hawker Beechcraft in 2014.

The company owns Superior Air Parts, Brantly International, Qingdao Brantly Investment Group, Weifang Freesky Aviation Industry and Qingdao Haili Helicopter Manufacturing.
