= Beijing E-Town =

Chinese economic development agency

Agency overview
- Formed: 1994
- Parent department: Beijing Municipal People's Government
- Website: www.beijingetown.com.cn

Beijing E-Town (Chinese: 北京亦庄) is an economic development agency of the Beijing Municipal People's Government that traces its origins to 1994 when the Beijing government chartered an entity to help foster high tech manufacturing in Beijing.

E-Town supports high-tech manufacturing by multiple means. When it was established, E-Town's responsibility was to operate the Beijing Economic-Technological Development Area (BDA) in Daxing district, an industrial park that accounts for much of the manufacturing in Beijing. E-Town would eventually go into investment management as a participant in buyer consortiums that acquired cross-border assets and in financial investments in private equity and venture capital funds.

== Acquisitions ==
Through acquisitions as part of a consortium with other buyers, E-Town International has acquired several high tech manufacturing businesses in the semiconductor, aviation, automotive, and telecom sectors.

=== Early investments ===
One of E-Town's earliest outbound investments was in UTStarcom in 2010. In exchange for newly issued common stock shares in UTStarcom, Beijing E-Town International Investment and Development Co., Ltd., an investment subsidiary of E-Town, invested $25 million in the company.

In 2010, E-Town along with the Tempo Group and Aviation Industry Corporation of China, both Chinese companies, formed a joint venture, Pacific Century Motors, as an investment vehicle for acquiring Nexteer Automotive, an auto parts company producing steering and driveline components, from General Motors for $450 million. During the 2008 financial crisis, Nexteer was on the brink of closure. The acquisition by the Chinese buyer group led to a turnaround with revenue growing from US$2 billion in 2010 to US$2.4 billion in 2013. During that period of time Nexteer has invested $400 million in the US operations of the company.

=== Aviation ambitions ===
E-Town has sought to enter into the aviation business through outbound acquisitions and floated a plan for aviation manufacturing in Beijing.

It holds 40% of the ownership interest in Superior Aviation Beijing, which in July 2012 proposed a US$1.79 billion purchase of Hawker Beechcraft, a US-based business jet and general aviation manufacturer that entered into bankruptcy reorganization in the same year. However, the deal was not consummated due to concerns that included the prospect of rejection of the deal by US regulators. Hawker Beechcraft blamed the failure on anti-Chinese investment climate in the US led to regulatory uncertainty for approval of the deal. Following collapse of the deal, Superior paid a $50 million "break fee" to the company as had been agreed according to the purchase agreement. The failure to close a deal with E-Town was a blow to the bankrupt company, which would emerge from bankruptcy as the Beechcraft Corporation, a re-branded smaller company after the closure of the jet lines and layoff of workers.

=== Semiconductor ===
E-Town has been particularly keen to invest in the semiconductor sector since 2015.

In 2015, it participated as member of a large buyer consortium Uphill Investment in the acquisition of Integrated Silicon Solution Inc., a major producer of NOR flash, for US$731 million. The buyer consortium of Uphill Investment Co. comprised eTown MemTek Ltd, Summitview Capital, Beijing Integrated Circuit Design and Test Fund, and Huaqing Jiye Investment Management Co., Ltd. eTown MemTek Ltd is formed by GigaDevice with E-Town.

As part of the buyer consortium, Beijing E-Town Dragon Semiconductor Industry Investment Center, E-Town International led on the acquisition of Fremont, California-based Mattson Technology, a semiconductor equipment manufacturer, in 2016. In another transaction in 2016, E-Town International as part of another buyer consortium, this time with Chipone Technology, acquired Integrated Memory Logic Limited for $136 million.

== Fund of funds ==
E-Town Capital has invested in numerous private equity and investment funds through its fund of funds. In an advertisement in China Daily at the end of 2016, E-Town Capital stated it had "over 240 billion RMB in 50 funds". Notably it has established a cross-border buyout fund with AGIC Capital to buy Gimatic Srl, an Italian manufacturer of mechanical front arm, and Krauss Maffei.
