= Greeting (disambiguation) =

A greeting is an act of communication in which human beings intentionally make their presence known to each other.

Greeting may also refer to:

== Films ==
- Greetings (1968 film), 1968 film by Brian De Palma

== Music ==
- Greeting (album), 2004 album by Nami Tamaki
- The Greeting, 1978 album a McCoy Tyner film
- "Greetings", a song by P.O.D. from The Fundamental Elements of Southtown
- "Greetings", a song by Devin Townsend from Ocean Machine: Biomech
- "Greetings", a song by Pixy from Reborn

== Other uses ==
- Thomas Greeting, English musician
