= Lectionary 186 =

Lectionary ℓ 186
- New Testament manuscript
- Text: Evangelistarion †
- Date: 11th century
- Script: Greek
- Now at: Trinity College, Cambridge
- Size: 31.5 cm by 22.5 cm
- Hand: beautifully written

Lectionary 186, designated by siglum ℓ 186 (in the Gregory-Aland numbering) is a Greek manuscript of the New Testament, on parchment leaves. Palaeographically it has been assigned to the 11th century. Scrivener labelled it by 221^{e}.

== Description ==
The codex contains Lessons from the Gospels of John, Matthew, Luke lectionary (Evangelistarium), on 218 parchment leaves (31.5 cm by 22.5 cm), with lacunae. The text is written in Greek minuscule letters, in two columns per page, 20 lines per page, in beautiful bold minuscule letters. The headings in gold capitals, initials in gold colours. It contains illuminations and musical notes in red.

There are daily lessons from Easter to Pentecost.

== History ==
The manuscript once was in possession of Thomas Gale (1636–1702) along with Minuscule 66.

It was examined by Scrivener, who added it to the list of New Testament manuscripts. Gregory saw it in 1883.

The manuscript is not cited in the critical editions of the Greek New Testament (UBS3).

Currently the codex is located in the Trinity College (O. IV. 22) at Cambridge.

== See also ==
- List of New Testament lectionaries
- Biblical manuscript
- Textual criticism

== Bibliography ==
- F. H. A. Scrivener, Adversaria critica Sacra (Cambridge 1893), p. 14.
