= Samuel Gale =

English antiquary

Samuel Gale (17 December 1682 – 10 January 1754) was an English antiquary, and a founder of the Society of Antiquaries of London.

== Early life ==
Samiel Gale was born in the parish of St Faith's, London, on 17 December 1682, the youngest son of Thomas Gale, Dean of York, and his wife Barbara, daughter of Roger Pepys, and brother of Roger Gale. He was baptised on 20 December, his cousin Samuel Pepys being one of his godfathers. He was educated at St Paul's School, London, where his father was High Master, but did not attend university.

== Career ==
Around 1702 Gale obtained a post in the Custom House, London. At the time of his death, he was one of the land surveyors of the customs, and searcher of the books and curiosities imported into England. Gale was one of the founders of the revived Society of Antiquaries, and was elected its first treasurer in January 1718. He resigned the treasurership in 1740. He was also a member of the Spalding Gentlemen's Society, and of the Brazennose Literary Society at Stamford (founded 1745).

Gale went on archaeological excursions through England. For many years he and his friend Andrew Ducarel used to travel incognito in August, journeying about fifteen miles a day. They took up their quarters at an inn, exploring the country for three or four miles round. They had with them William Camden's Britannia and a set of maps. In 1705 Gale visited Oxford, Bath and Stonehenge, and wrote descriptive accounts. On 29 August 1744 he made a pilgrimage with William Stukeley to Croyland Abbey. On 16 May 1747 he visited Cannons, the mansion of the Duke of Chandos, and, lamenting its impending demolition, went into the chapel, and preached an appropriate sermon, while his two companions sang an anthem and psalms.

== Death and personal life ==
Gale died of a fever on 10 January 1754 at his lodgings, the Chicken-house, Hampstead. He was buried by Stukeley on 14 January in the burial ground of St George's, Queen Square, London, near the Foundling Hospital. He was unmarried.

== Legacy ==
A portrait of Gale was painted by his close friend, Isaac Whood.

His collection of prints by Wenceslaus Hollar, Jacques Callot, and others was sold by auction in 1754 by Abraham Langford. Most of his books were bought by Osborn.

== Works ==
The only writings published by Gale in his lifetime were A History of Winchester Cathedral (1715; a work begun by Henry Hyde, 2nd Earl of Clarendon), and two papers – "Ulphus' Horn at York" and "Cæsar's passage over the Thames" – in Archaeologia, vol. 1. He gave some material to Francis Drake for his Eboracum, and probably furnished Thomas Hearne with readings of John Leland's Itinerary. George Vertue's prints of the old chapel under London Bridge were designed under his patronage.

After his death, Gale's unpublished manuscripts became the property of his only sister Elizabeth, and came into the hands of her husband, Stukeley; from whom they passed to Ducarel, and were then bought by Richard Gough. John Nichols printed many of them in the Reliquiæ Galeanæ (1781, &c.), including the "Tour through several parts of England" in 1705 (revised by Gale, 1730); "A Dissertation on Celts"; "Account of some Antiquities at Glastonbury", 1711; and "Observations on Kingsbury, Middlesex", 1751.
