= Minuscule 66 =

Greek minuscule manuscript of the New Testament

- New Testament manuscript
- Name: Galei Londinensis
- Text: Gospels
- Date: 14th century
- Script: Greek
- Found: 1674, John Covel
- Now at: Trinity College
- Size: 21.4 cm by 14.6 cm
- Type: Byzantine text-type
- Category: V
- Note: member of K^{r}

Minuscule 66 (in the Gregory-Aland numbering), ε 519 (von Soden), known as Codex Galei Londinensis, is a Greek minuscule manuscript of the New Testament, on paper leaves. Palaeographically it has been assigned to the 14th century.

== Description ==
The codex contains a complete text of the four Gospels on 298 leaves (size 21.4 cm by 14.6 cm). The text is written in one column per page, 21 lines per page.

The text is divided according to the κεφάλαια (chapters), whose numbers are given at the margin, with their τίτλοι (titles) at the top of the pages. There is also a division according to the Αmmonian Sections, with references to the Eusebian Canons.

It contains the Epistle to Carpian, Eusebian Canon tables (only 5 leaves), lists of the κεφάλαια (lists of contents) are placed before each Gospel, synaxaria, Menologion, pictures, lectionary markings at the margin (for liturgical use), ἀναγνώσεις (lessons), and numbers of στίχοι at the end of each Gospel. Some scholia in the margin were added by a later hand.

== Text ==
The Greek text of the codex is a representative of the Byzantine text-type. Hermann von Soden classified it to the textual family K^{r}. Aland placed it in Category V. According to the Claremont Profile Method it belongs to the textual family K^{r} in Luke 1, 10, and 20.

== History ==
The manuscript once was in possession of Thomas Gale (1636-1702) – along with Lectionary 186 – hence name of the codex. It was examined and described by Mill, Scrivener, Gregory, and Hatch.

Scrivener collated its text in 1862, but publish posthumously in 1893 in his Adversaria critica sacra.

It is currently housed at the Trinity College (O. VIII. 3), at Cambridge.

== See also ==
- List of New Testament minuscules
- Biblical manuscript
- Textual criticism
