= Jane Birch =

Servant to diarist Samuel Pepys

- Born: c. 1643
- Died: 1700s
- Employers: Elisabeth Pepys; Samuel Pepys
- Spouse: Thomas Edwards

Jane Birch (b. 1643/4, d. after 1703) was a servant to Elisabeth and Samuel Pepys from when she was 14 and then, off and on, until Samuel's death. She is notable because over 10% of the population of London were women servants and her life is well documented by her employer's detailed personal diary.

== Life ==
She was working for Samuel and Elizabeth Pepys from when she was 14 and they all moved into a rented house in Whitehall in 1658. Evidence suggests that she had come to London to find work as she was not born or brought up in London as her mother lived outside the city.

Her life is known because, although over 10% of the population of London were women servants, her life is the only one that is well documented by her employer's personal detailed diary. Pepys started his daily diary on 1 January 1660. Pepys made 113 references about her in his diary and then mentioned her in his letters and his will.

Samuel Pepys prospered, and in 1660 the household moved to the City of London and he took on more staff. The Navy also supplied "a boy" who wore livery, carried a sword, and ran errands for Samuel. One of Birch's brothers, Wayneman Birch, took on this role but it ended badly.

In 1661 Jane Birch was joined by a second maid and in 1662 Birch became "cook-maid" being paid £3 a year. Samuel Pepys was known for trying to take advantage of his staff. In 1662 Samuel Pepys recorded that he was contemplating trying to see if "his wench" would co-operate, but he decided that Birch may well cause him problems if she reported his misbehavior to his wife. Her cooking was appreciated although at the end of the year she was promoted again to replace another servant, Sarah, as chambermaid. Her promotion to chambermaid meant that she worked closely with Elizabeth Pepys and after Elizabeth complained of "saucy words" Birch was obliged to leave in February 1663. In 1663 the Pepys staff were joined by a third maid and then a companion to Elizabeth Pepys.

In 1666 Elizabeth Pepys rediscovered Birch and she was re-employed in the Pepys household to take charge of the cooking. Birch left employment with the Pepys in 1669 to marry. In the previous year Pepys had sexually assaulted her and this had caused suspicion by Elizabeth. Birch married Tom Edwards who was an ex-chorister (recommended by Henry Cooke) who was employed by the Navy to look after Samuel Pepys in 1664. This was to do the job that Wayneman Birch had failed to do. The marriage was organised by Elizabeth and the feast was paid for by the Pepys. Samuel did not attend but he did give them £60 and Elizabeth made it up to £80. Elizabeth Pepys died in 1669. Tom was still employed by the Navy and after he died in 1681, Jane returned to the Pepys household. She did marry again but she was soon a widow for the second time.

Pepys died in 1703 and in his will he left Jane Birch five guineas to pay for her clothes for the funeral and re-confirmed a £15 annuity that he had given her in 1690.
