= Joseph Robson Tanner =

British historian

Joseph Robson Tanner (28 July 1860 – 15 January 1931) was an English historian, an expert on Samuel Pepys, author of numerous publications and Fellow of St John's College, Cambridge.

== Life ==
Tanner was born in Frome, Somerset, the eldest son of Joseph Tanner. He was educated at Mill Hill School, London, and at St John's College, Cambridge, where he took a First in the Historical Tripos in 1882. He was President of the Cambridge Union Society in Easter Term, 1883. He was a lecturer in History at St John's, from 1883 to 1921, and lecturer on Indian History to Indian Civil Service students, from 1885 to 1893.

In 1883 Tanner became a Fellow of St John's and was an Assistant Tutor from 1895 to 1900, a Tutor from 1900 to 1912, and Tutorial Bursar, 1900–21. He served as a deputy to the Regius Professor of Modern History, 1926–27.

In 1888 Tanner married Charlotte Maria, second daughter of George J. Larkman of Belton. After living in Cambridge for forty-two years he moved to Woodside, Aldeburgh, Suffolk. He is buried at the Parish of the Ascension Burial Ground in Cambridge.

== Select publications ==
- Two Discourses of the Navy 1638 and 1659, by John Hollond; and A Discourse of the Navy, 1660, by Sir Robert Slyngesbie, ed., 1896.
- Pepys's Memoirs of the Royal Navy, ed., 1906.
- The Navy of the Commonwealth and the First Dutch War, 1906.
- The Historical Register of the University of Cambridge, being a supplement to the Calendar with a record of university offices, honours and distinctions to the year 1910, ed., 1917.
- Samuel Pepys and the Royal Navy [Lees Knowles Lectures, 1919], 1920.
- Tudor Constitutional Documents, A.D. 1485–1603, ed., 1922.
- Mr Pepys: An Introduction to the Diary together with a Sketch of his Later Life, 1925.
- Pepys's Naval Minutes, 1926.
- Private Correspondence of Samuel Pepys, 1679–1703, ed., 1926.
- English Constitutional Conflicts of the seventeenth century, 1603–1689, 1928.
- Further Correspondence of Samuel Pepys, 1662–1679, ed., 1929.
- Constitutional Documents of the Reign of James I, A.D. 1603-1625, 1930.

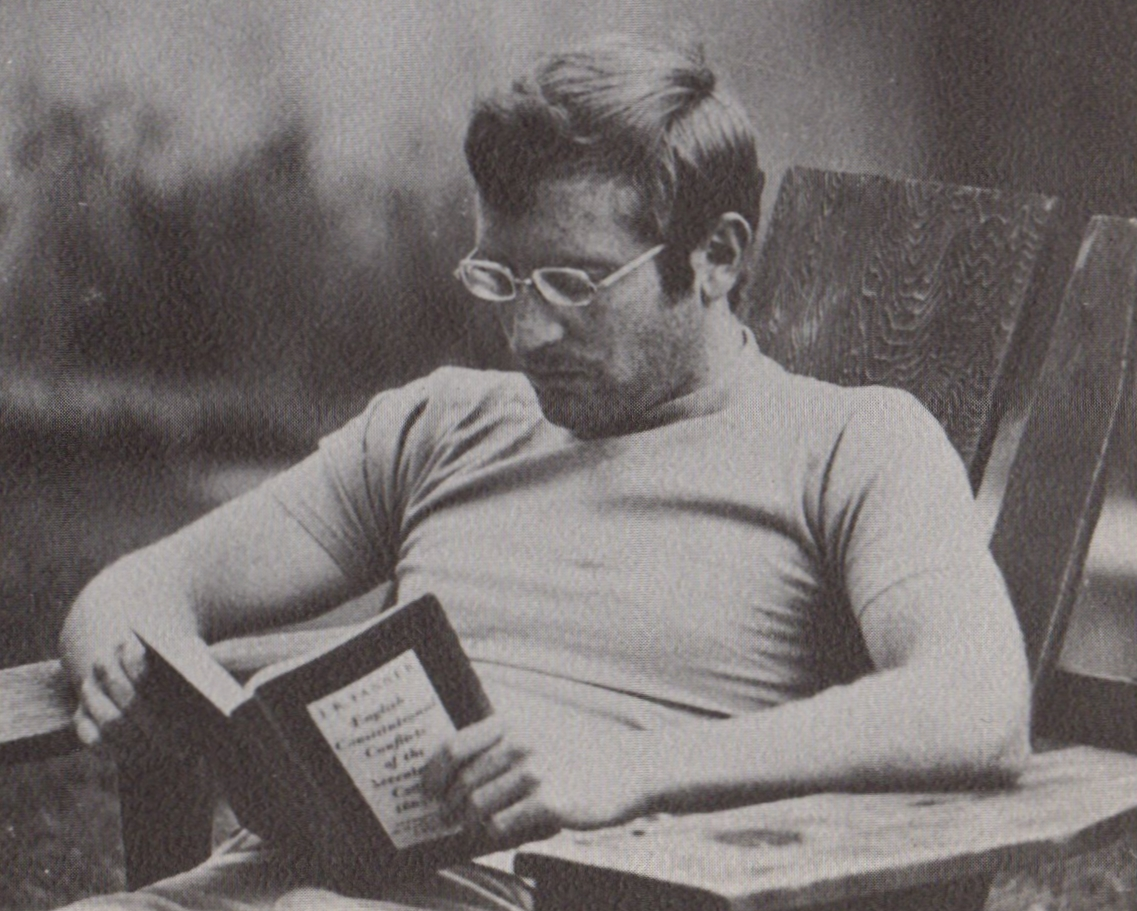
Student reading Tanner's English Constitutional Conflicts at Shimer College in 1973.
