= Elisabeth Pepys =

Wife of Samuel Pepys (1640–1669)

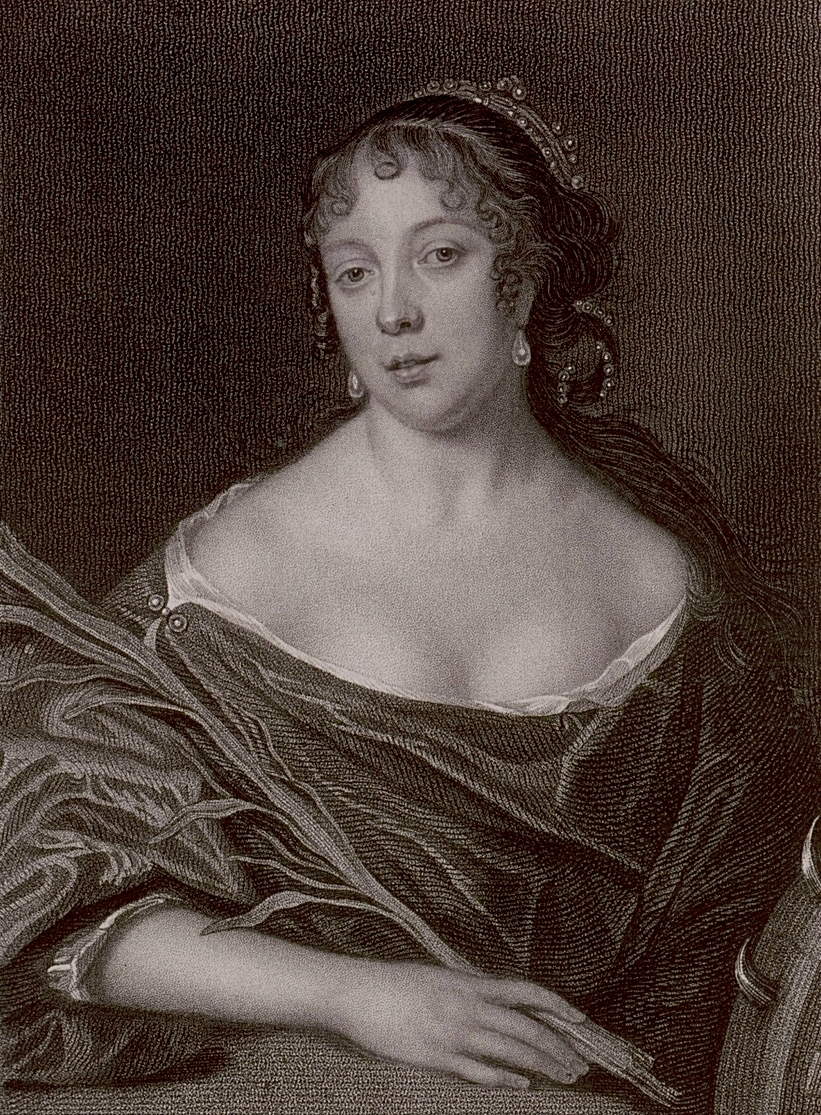
- Elisabeth Pepys in a stipple engraving by John Thomson, after a painting of 1666 (now destroyed) by John Hayls
- Born: Elisabeth de St Michel; 23 October 1640; Bideford, Devon, England
- Died: 10 November 1669 (aged 29); London, England
- Resting place: St Olave's, London, England
- Known for: Husband's diary
- Spouse: Samuel Pepys (m. 1655)

Elisabeth Pepys (née de St Michel; 23 October 1640 – 10 November 1669) was the wife of Samuel Pepys, whom she married in 1655, shortly before her fifteenth birthday.

Her father, Alexandre Marchant de St Michel, was born a French Roman Catholic but later converted to the Church of England. He married Dorothea, a daughter of Sir Francis Kingsmill, in Ireland. Elizabeth was born near Bideford in Devon on 23 October 1640. She died of typhoid on 10 November 1669.

Elisabeth was a second cousin once removed of the writer Anne Finch, Countess of Winchilsea.

== Diary of Samuel Pepys ==
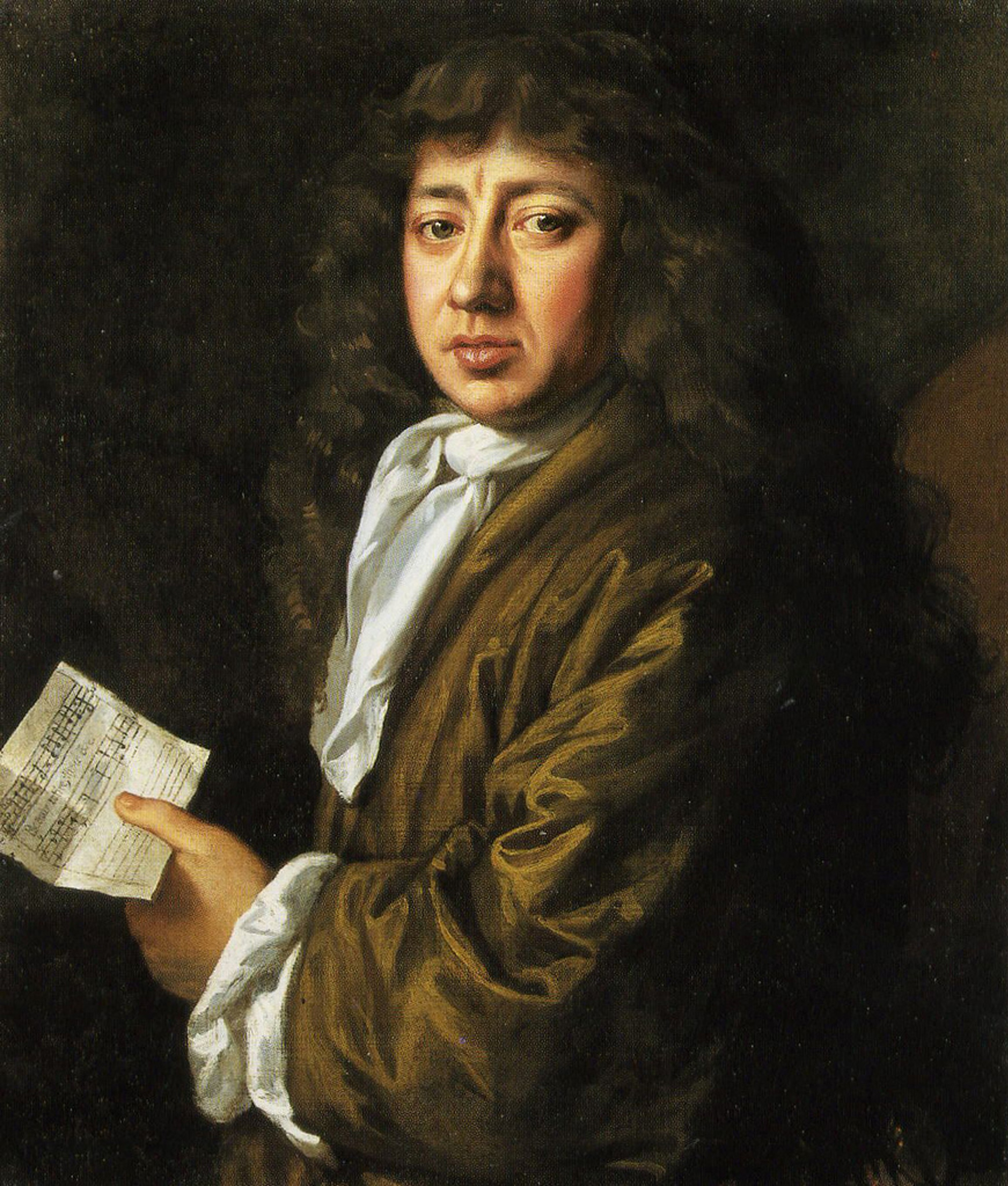
Samuel Pepys by John Hayls, who also painted Mrs Pepys

Most of what is known about Elisabeth Pepys comes from her husband's diary, which he kept between January 1660 and 31 May 1669. Their marriage and relationship are a key theme throughout. They were married on 1 December 1655 at St Margaret's, Westminster, not by a clergyman but by Richard Sherwyn, Esq., a Westminster Justice of the Peace, an arrangement for civil marriages put in place by Cromwell's government. Samuel Pepys later remembered the wedding in great detail, recalling that Elisabeth had worn a petticoat trimmed with gold lace. Although the couple had a civil ceremony on 1 December 1655, they celebrated their wedding anniversary on 10 October, when a religious ceremony was held and they started to live together. Richard Ollard attributes this lapse of time to Elisabeth's youth.

It is well known that Samuel was unfaithful to Elisabeth, often with their own maids. His best documented affair is one with the young housemaid Deb Willet, whom Pepys became particularly fond of, referring to her in the second to last line of his diary. However, it is clear that Pepys held strong feelings for his wife throughout their marriage. When they were away from each other, Samuel greatly missed Elisabeth. Although they were separated for several months shortly after marrying, this has been considered to be a result of Samuel's strong feelings of jealousy. They reunited shortly before the diary was begun and lived in Axe Yard. The couple had a 14-year-old servant named Jane Birch and she and her eventual husband were their longest serving staff. In time as the household prospered the staff increased including a companion maid for Elisabeth. There were five in total with the longest, Mary Mercer, employed for two years. Jane Birch left after Elisabeth complained about her lack of respect, but it was Elisabeth who later sought her out to re-employ her as a cook. After Samuel Pepys had behaved badly towards Jane Birch, it was Elisabeth who arranged her wedding and she added £20 to the £60 that Samuel gave as a wedding gift. Samuel did not attend.

Samuel's changeable feelings for Elisabeth can be seen throughout his diary. A resentful sentence from 25 April 1663 suggests jealous feelings surrounding her and her dancing teacher, or perhaps a simple familiarity with Elisabeth and her self-confidence: "...merrily practising to dance, which my wife hath begun to learn this day of Mr. Pembleton, but I fear will hardly do any great good at it, because she is conceited that she do well already, though I think no such thing."

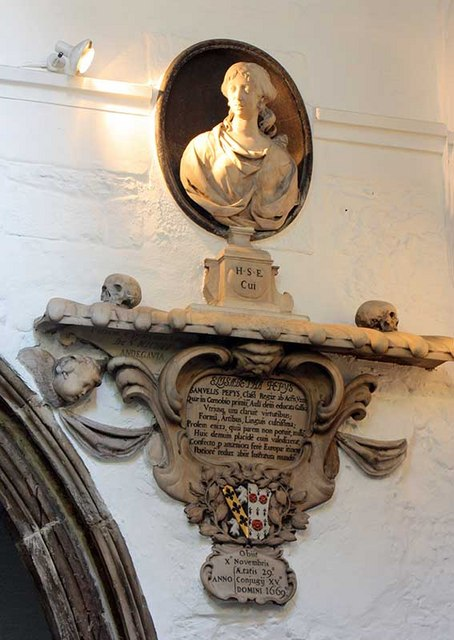
Memorial to Elisabeth Pepys, St Olave's

Samuel's affection towards Elisabeth can be seen prominently in letters during her severe typhoid fever and after her death, as he apologises to fellow politicians and naval captains for not attending board meetings for four weeks after the death and not keeping up to date with letters during her illness: "CAPTAIN ELLIOT, I beg you earnestly to believe that nothing but the sorrow and distraction I have been in by the death of my wife, increased by the suddenness with which it pleased God to surprise me therewith, after a voyage so full of health and content, could have forced me to so long a neglect of my private concernments."

Following Elisabeth’s death, Samuel’s continuing affection towards her has been suggested through his succeeding relationship with Mary Skinner and his decision to not marry her, even though, as evidenced in his letters to John Evelyn, she acted as his wife in all but name. Similarly, when he died in 1703, regardless of his long-term relationship with Mary Skinner, on his own orders Pepys was laid to rest next to his wife.

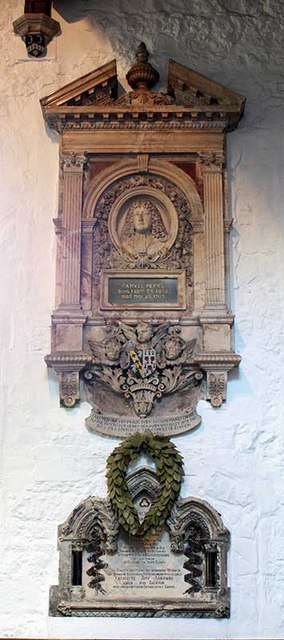
Memorial to Samuel Pepys, St Olave's

== In popular culture ==
In 1991, Dale Spender published a fictional literary spoof, The Diary of Elizabeth Pepys (1991, Grafton Books, London). Purportedly written by Elisabeth, the book is a feminist critique of women's lives in Restoration London.
