= Talbot Pepys =

English politician

Talbot Pepys (c. March or April 1583 – 1 March 1666) was an English politician who sat in the House of Commons in 1625.

Pepys was the youngest son of John Pepys of Cottenham, Cambridgeshire and his wife Edith Talbot. He was baptised at Impington on 2 April 1583. His mother died five months after his birth. He inherited the site of his father's mansion at Impington when he was just six years old in 1589.

Pepys matriculated from King's College, Cambridge in 1595 and became a scholar of Trinity Hall, Cambridge in 1601. He was admitted at Middle Temple on 13 May 1605 and was called to the bar in 1613. In 1624 he was appointed Recorder of Cambridge Corporation, a position he held until 1660.

In 1625, Pepys was elected Member of Parliament for Cambridge. He was Reader of Middle Temple in 1631 and Treasurer in 1640.

Pepys was often visited by his great nephew Samuel Pepys the diarist and was considered a very wise man.

Pepys died at the age of 82 at Impington and was buried in Impington Church on 5 March 1666.

Pepys married firstly, Beatrice Castell, daughter of John Castell of Raveningham, Norfolk on 3 August 1617. They had five children. After Beatrice's death he married secondly Paulina, who died in 1626 and was buried at St Peter's Church in Cambridge. He married his third wife Mary Tesmond not long after Paulina's death. His last wife was Mary Barker. His son Roger followed him as recorder of Cambridge and was also MP for the constituency.

Parliament of England
Preceded by Francis Brakyn; Robert Luckyn	Member of Parliament for Cambridge; 1625; With: Thomas Meautys	Succeeded by Thomas Purchase; Thomas Meautys
