= Samuel Pepys =

English diarist, civil servant and politician (1633–1703)

Samuel Pepys FRS
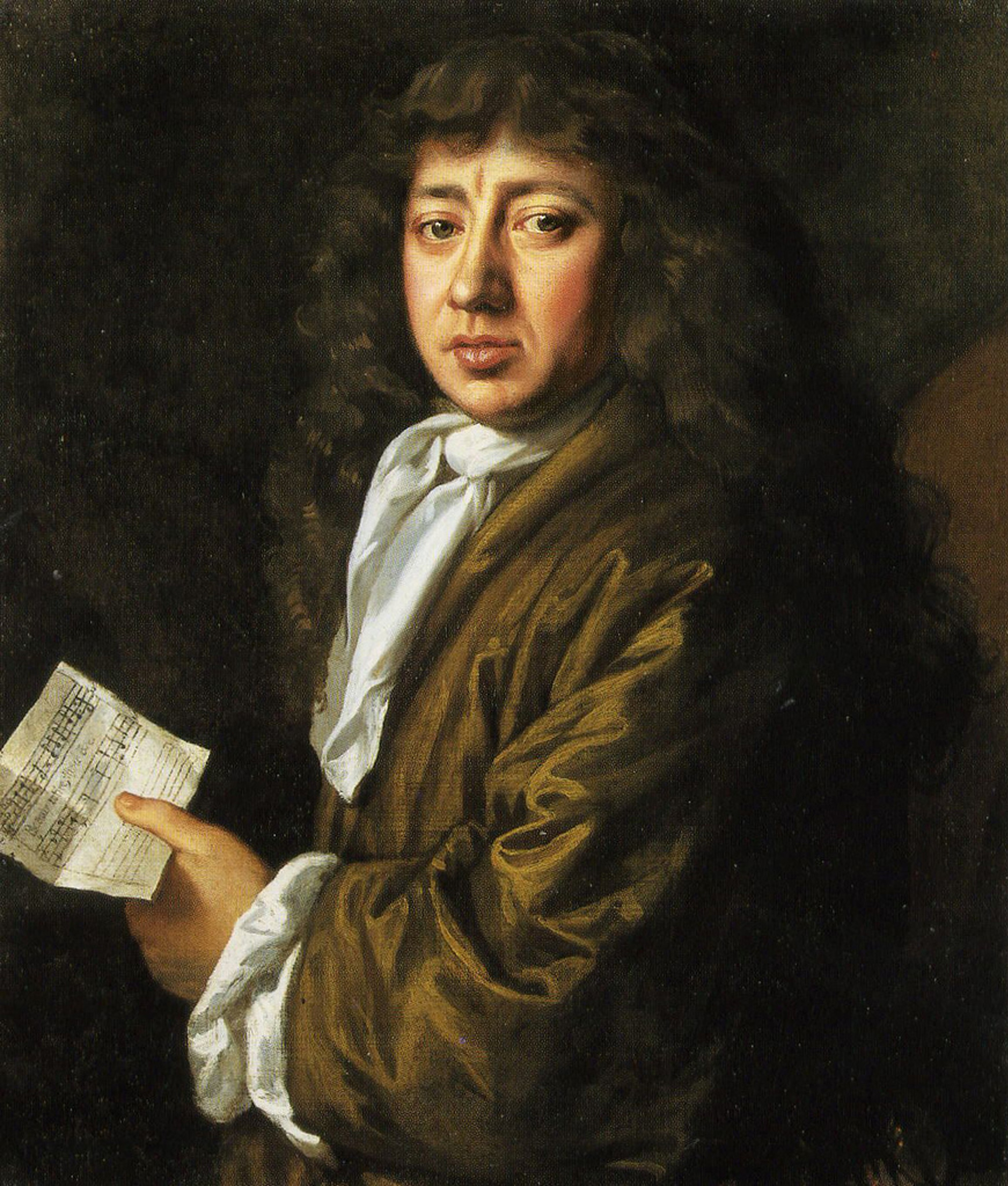
- Portrait by John Hayls, 1666

President of the Royal Society
- In office 1 December 1684 – 30 November 1686
- Preceded by: Cyril Wyche
- Succeeded by: John Vaughan

Member of Parliament for Harwich
- In office 1685–1689
- Preceded by: Thomas Middleton; Philip Parker
- Succeeded by: Thomas Middleton; John Eldred
- In office 1679–1679
- Preceded by: Capel Luckyn; Thomas King
- Succeeded by: Thomas Middleton; Philip Parker

Member of Parliament for Castle Rising
- In office 1673–1679
- Preceded by: Robert Paston; John Trevor
- Succeeded by: Robert Howard; James Hoste

Personal details
- Born: 23 February 1633 Fleet Street, London, England
- Died: 26 May 1703 (aged 70) Clapham, Surrey, England
- Resting place: St Olave's, London; 51.510878°N 0.079627°W
- Party: Tory
- Spouse: Elisabeth de St Michel (m. 1655; died 1669)
- Relatives: Edward Montagu (cousin); Talbot Pepys (great uncle); Sir Richard Pepys (cousin); Richard Edgcumbe
- Education: Huntingdon Grammar School; St Paul's School; Magdalene College, Cambridge
- Occupation: Naval administrator; Chief Secretary to the Admiralty; Tory Member of Parliament for Castle Rising and Harwich
- Known for: Diarist

Samuel Pepys (/ˈpiːps/ PEEPS; 23 February 1633 – 26 May 1703) was an English writer and Tory politician. He served as an official in the Navy Board and Member of Parliament, but is now most renowned for the diary he kept for almost a decade. It is considered one of the most notable diaries ever written, particularly for its detailed personal accounts of his everyday life, the Great Plague of London and the Fire of London. For historians it is an important primary source of the Stuart Restoration and of upper-middle class London life at the time.

Son of a tailor, Pepys was educated at St Paul's School and attended Magdalene College, Cambridge. After receiving his Bachelor of Arts degree, he entered the service of his cousin Sir Edward Montagu, and later found work as a teller in the Exchequer under George Downing. Pepys began to keep a detailed private diary in 1660. The diary provides a combination of personal revelation and eyewitness accounts of major events, such as the Second Anglo-Dutch War, the Great Plague of London, and the Great Fire of London. He recorded his daily life until 1669 when concerns over fading eyesight forced him to abandon the routine.

In 1660, courtesy of Montagu, Pepys secured the position of the Clerk of the Acts to the Navy Board. Despite his lack of maritime experience, he eventually rose to become the Chief Secretary to the Admiralty under both Charles II and James II through patronage, diligence, and his talent for administration. His influence and reforms at the English Admiralty were important in the early professionalisation of the Royal Navy. He was elected MP for Castle Rising in 1673 and Harwich in 1679 and 1685. From 1684 to 1686, he served as President of the Royal Society.

== Early life ==
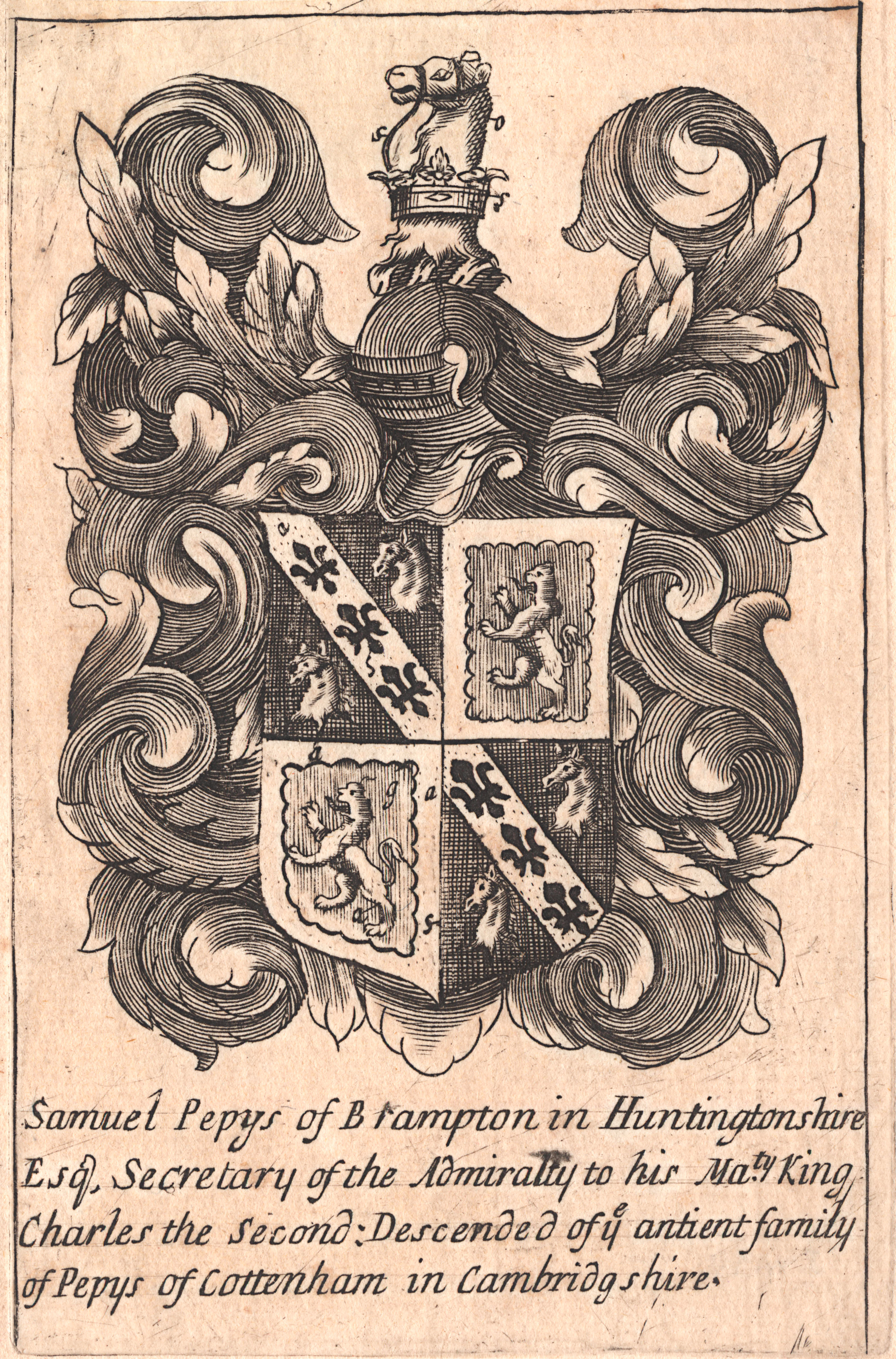
Bookplate, c. 1680–1690, with arms of Samuel Pepys: Quarterly 1st & 4th: Sable, on a bend or between two nag's heads erased argent three fleurs-de-lis of the field (Pepys); 2nd & 3rd: Gules, a lion rampant within a bordure engrailed or (Talbot). Samuel Pepys was descended from John Pepys who married Elizabeth Talbot, the heiress of Cottenham in Cambridgeshire. The Pepys arms are borne by the Pepys family, Earls of Cottenham.

Pepys was born in Salisbury Court, Fleet Street, London, on 23 February 1633, the son of John Pepys (1601–1680), a tailor, and Margaret Pepys (née Kite; died 1667), daughter of a Whitechapel butcher. His great-uncle Talbot Pepys was Recorder and briefly Member of Parliament (MP) for Cambridge in 1625. His father's first cousin Sir Richard Pepys was elected MP for Sudbury in 1640, appointed Baron of the Exchequer on 30 May 1654, and appointed Lord Chief Justice of Ireland on 25 September 1655.

Pepys was the fifth of 11 children, but child mortality was high and he was soon the eldest survivor. He was baptised at St Bride's Church on 3 March 1633. Pepys did not spend all of his infancy in London; for a while, he was sent to live with nurse Goody Lawrence at Kingsland, just north of the city. In about 1644, Pepys attended Huntingdon Grammar School before being educated at St Paul's School, London, c. 1646–1650. He attended the execution of Charles I in 1649.

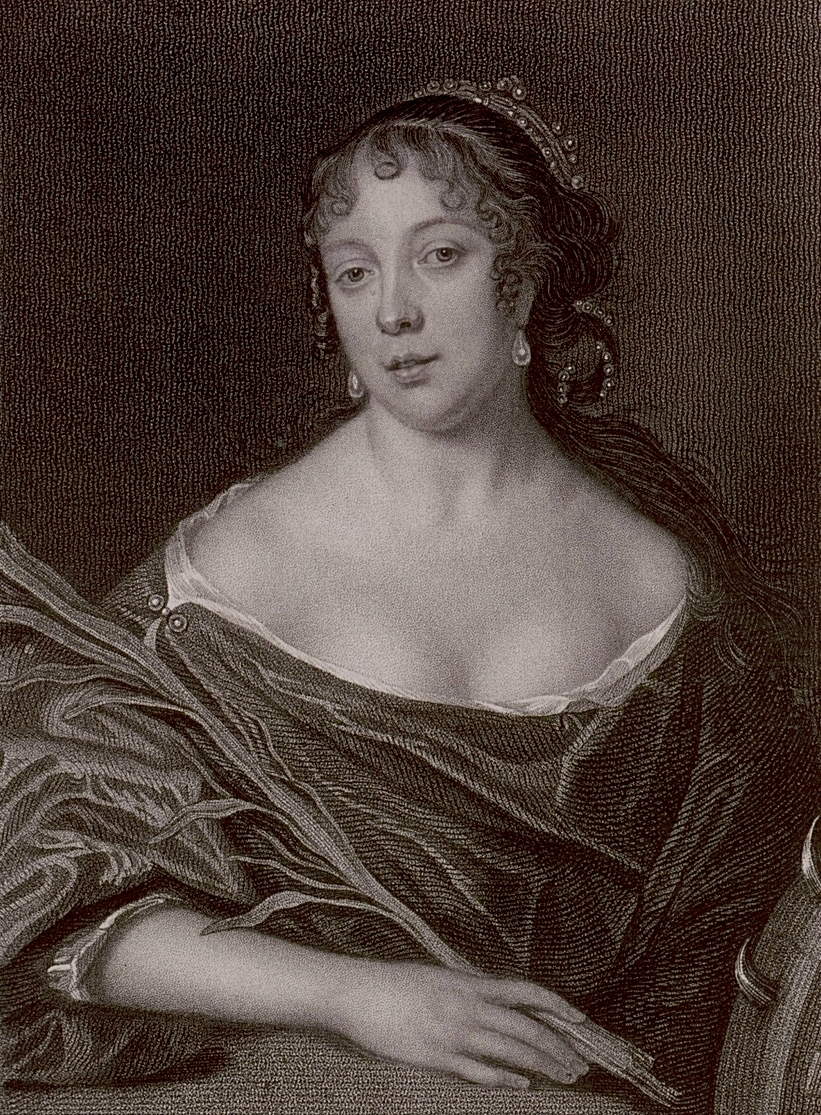
Elisabeth de St Michel, Pepys's wife. Stipple engraving by James Thomson, after a 1666 painting (now destroyed) by John Hayls.

In 1650, he went to the University of Cambridge, having received two exhibitions from St Paul's School (perhaps owing to the influence of George Downing, who was chairman of the judges and for whom he later worked at the Exchequer) and a grant from the Mercers' Company. In October, he was admitted as a sizar to Magdalene College; he moved there in March 1651 and took his Bachelor of Arts degree in 1654.

Later in 1654 or early in 1655, he entered the household of one of his father's cousins, Sir Edward Montagu, who was later created the 1st Earl of Sandwich.

When he was 22, Pepys married 14-year-old Elisabeth de St Michel, a descendant of French Huguenot immigrants, first in a religious ceremony on 10 October 1655 and later in a civil ceremony on 1 December 1655 at St Margaret's, Westminster.

=== Illness ===
From a young age, Pepys suffered from bladder stones in his urinary tract—a condition that had also afflicted his mother and his brother John. He was almost never without pain, as well as other symptoms, including "blood in the urine" (haematuria). By the time of his marriage, the condition was very severe.

In 1657, Pepys decided to undergo surgery; not an easy option, as the operation was known to be especially painful and hazardous. Nevertheless, Pepys consulted surgeon Thomas Hollier and, on 26 March 1658, the operation took place in a bedroom in the house of Pepys's cousin Jane Turner. (Note: The procedure, described by Pepys as being "cut of the stone", was conducted without anaesthetics or antiseptics and involved restraining the patient with ropes and four strong men. The surgeon then made an incision along the perineum (between the scrotum and the anus), about three inches (8 cm) long and deep enough to cut into the bladder. The stone was removed through this opening with pincers from below, assisted, from above, by a tool inserted into the bladder through the penis. A detailed description can be found in Tomalin (2002).) Pepys's stone was successfully removed (Note: The stone was described as being the size of a tennis ball; presumably, a real tennis ball, which is slightly smaller than a modern lawn tennis ball, but still an unusually large stone.) and he resolved to hold a celebration on every anniversary of the operation, which he did for several years. (Note: On Monday 26 March 1660, he wrote, in his diary, "This day it is two years since it pleased God that I was cut of the stone at Mrs. Turner's in Salisbury Court. And did resolve while I live to keep it a festival, as I did the last year at my house, and for ever to have Mrs. Turner and her company with me.") However, there were long-term effects from the operation. The incision on his bladder broke open again late in his life. The procedure may have left him sterile, though there is no direct evidence for this, as he was childless before the operation. (Note: There are references in the diary to pains in his bladder, whenever he caught cold. In April 1700, Pepys wrote, to his nephew Jackson, "It has been my calamity for much the greatest part of this time to have been kept bedrid, under an evil so rarely known as to have had it matter of universal surprise and with little less general opinion of its dangerousness; namely, that the cicatrice of a wound occasioned upon my cutting of the stone, without hearing anything of it in all this time, should after more than 40 years' perfect cure, break out again." After Pepys's death, the post-mortem examination showed his left kidney was completely ulcerated; seven stones, weighing four-and-a-half ounces (130 g), were also found. His bladder was gangrenous, and the old wound was broken open again.) In mid-1658 Pepys moved to Axe Yard, near the modern Downing Street. He worked as a teller in the Exchequer under George Downing.

== Diary ==
Spoken excerpt of Pepys's diary

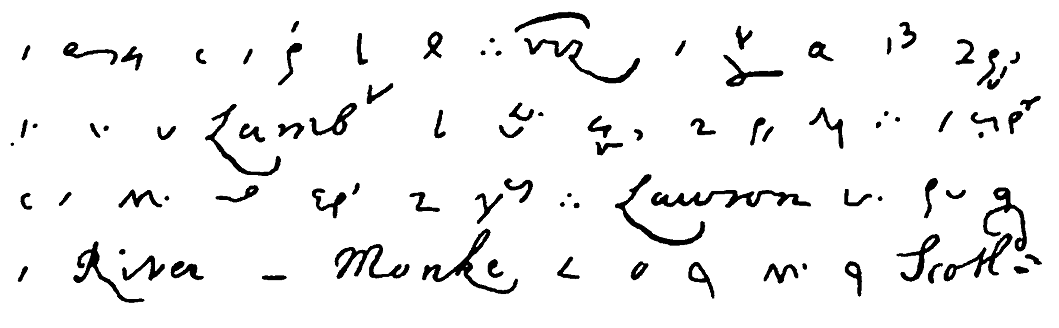
A facsimile of part of the first entry in the diary

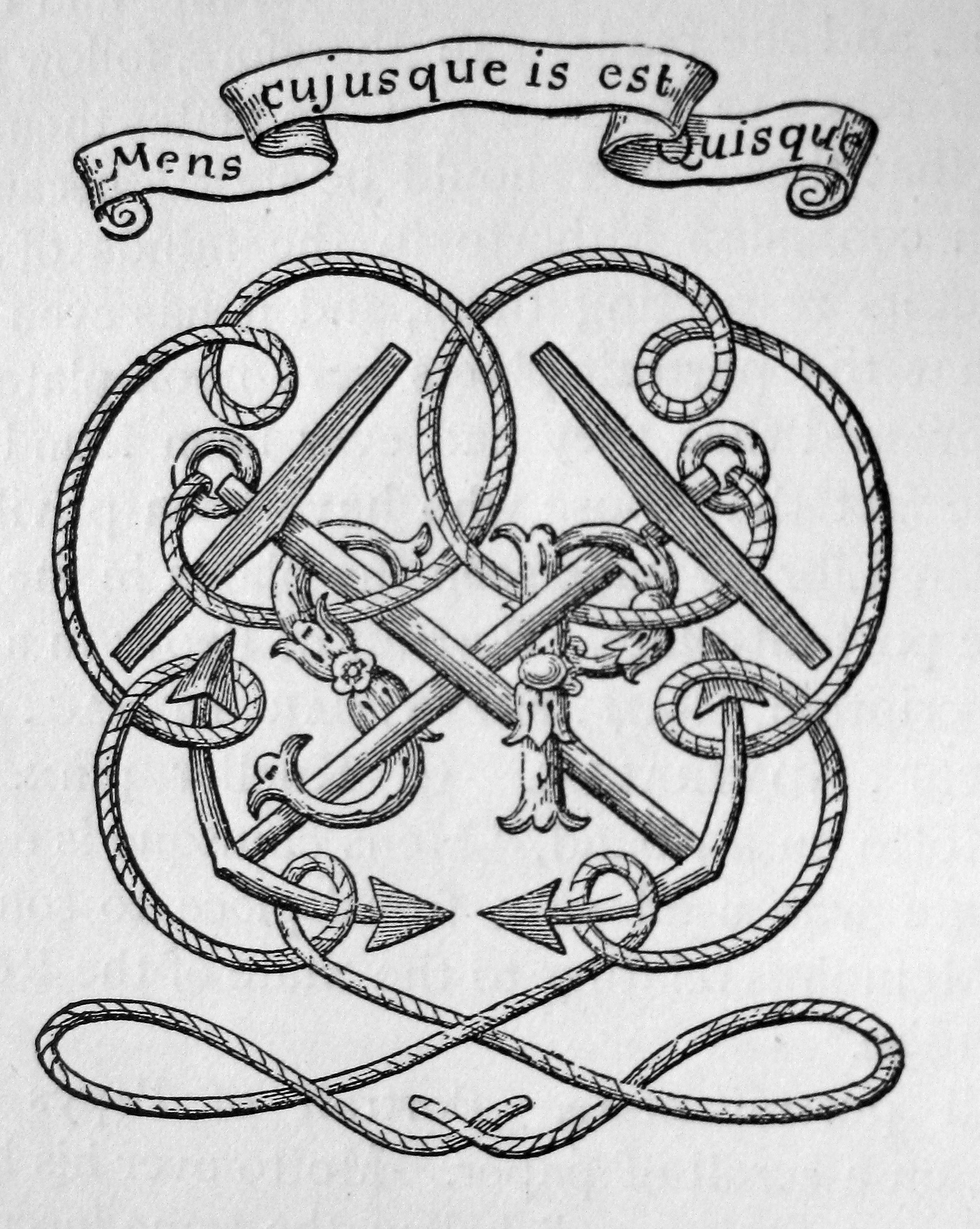
Samuel Pepys's bookplate. The motto reads Mens cujusque is est Quisque – "Mind Makes the Man".

On 1 January 1660 ("1 January 1659/1660" in contemporary terms), Pepys began to keep a diary. He recorded his daily life for almost 10 years. This record of a decade of Pepys's life in one and a quarter million words and populated by over 3,000 individuals is often regarded as Britain's most celebrated diary. Pepys has been called the greatest diarist of all time due to his frankness in writing concerning his own weaknesses and the accuracy with which he records events of daily British life and major events in the 17th century. Pepys wrote about the contemporary court and theatre (including his amorous affairs with the actresses), his household, and major political and social occurrences. Historians have used his diary to gain greater insight and understanding of life in London in the 17th century. Pepys wrote consistently on subjects such as personal finances, the time he got up in the morning, the weather, and what he ate. He wrote at length about his new watch which he was very proud of (and which had an alarm, a new accessory at the time), a country visitor who did not enjoy his time in London because he felt that it was too crowded, and his cat waking him up at one in the morning. Pepys's diary is one of a very few sources which provides such length in details of everyday life of an upper-middle-class man during the 17th century. The descriptions of the lives of his servants like Jane Birch provide a valuable detailed insight into their lives.

Aside from day-to-day activities, Pepys also commented on the significant and turbulent events of his nation. England was in disarray when he began writing his diary. Oliver Cromwell had died just fifteen months earlier, creating a period of civil unrest and a large power vacuum to be filled. Pepys had been a strong supporter of Cromwell, but he converted to the Royalist cause upon the Protector's death. He was on the ship that returned Charles II to England to take up his throne and gave first-hand accounts of other significant events from the early years of the Restoration, such as the coronation of Charles II, the Great Plague, the Great Fire of London, and the Anglo–Dutch Wars.

Pepys did not plan on his contemporaries ever seeing his diary, which is evident from the fact that he wrote in shorthand and sometimes in a "code" of various Spanish, French, and Italian words (especially when describing his illicit affairs). However, Pepys often juxtaposed profanities in his native English amidst his "code" of foreign words, a practice which would reveal the details to any casual reader. He did intend for future generations to see the diary, as evidenced by its inclusion in his library and its catalogue before his death along with the shorthand guide he used and the elaborate planning by which he ensured his library survived intact after his death.

The women he pursued, his friends, and his dealings are all laid out. His diary reveals his jealousies, insecurities, trivial concerns, and his fractious relationship with his wife. It has been an important account of London in the 1660s. The juxtaposition of his commentary on politics and national events, alongside the very personal, can be seen from the beginning. His opening paragraphs, written in January 1660, begin:

Blessed be God, at the end of the last year I was in very good health, without any sense of my old pain but upon taking of cold. I lived in Axe yard, having my wife and servant Jane, and no more in family than us three. My wife, after the absence of her terms for seven weeks, (Note: This mention of Elizabeth Pepys's menstruation was omitted from the bowdlerised Wheatley transcription published in 1893 and used throughout this article. The quotation here uses the copyrighted Latham and Mathews edition to restore the text.) gave me hopes of her being with child, but on the last day of the year she hath them again.

The condition of the State was thus. Viz. the Rump, after being disturbed by my Lord Lambert, was lately returned to sit again. The officers of the army all forced to yield. Lawson lie[s] still in the River and Monke is with his army in Scotland. Only my Lord Lambert is not yet come in to the Parliament; nor is it expected that he will, without being forced to it.

— Diary of Samuel Pepys, January 1660.

The entries from the first few months were filled with news of General George Monck's march on London. In April and May of that year, he encountered problems with his wife, and he accompanied Montagu's fleet to the Netherlands to bring Charles II back from exile. Montagu was made Earl of Sandwich on 18 June, and Pepys secured the position of Clerk of the Acts to the Navy Board on 13 July. As secretary to the board, Pepys was entitled to a £350 annual salary plus the various gratuities and benefits that came with the job—including bribes. He rejected an offer of £1,000 for the position from a rival and soon afterward moved to official accommodation in Seething Lane in the City of London.

Pepys stopped writing his diary in 1669. His eyesight began to trouble him and he feared that writing in dim light was damaging his eyes. He did imply in his last entries that he might have others write his diary for him, but doing so would result in a loss of privacy and it seems that he never went through with those plans. In the end, Pepys lived another 34 years without going blind, but he never took to writing his diary again.

However, Pepys dictated a journal for two months in 1669–70 as a record of his dealings with the Commissioners of Accounts at that period. He also kept a diary for a few months in 1683 when he was sent to Tangier as the most senior civil servant in the Navy, during the English evacuation. The diary mostly covers work-related matters.

=== Public life ===
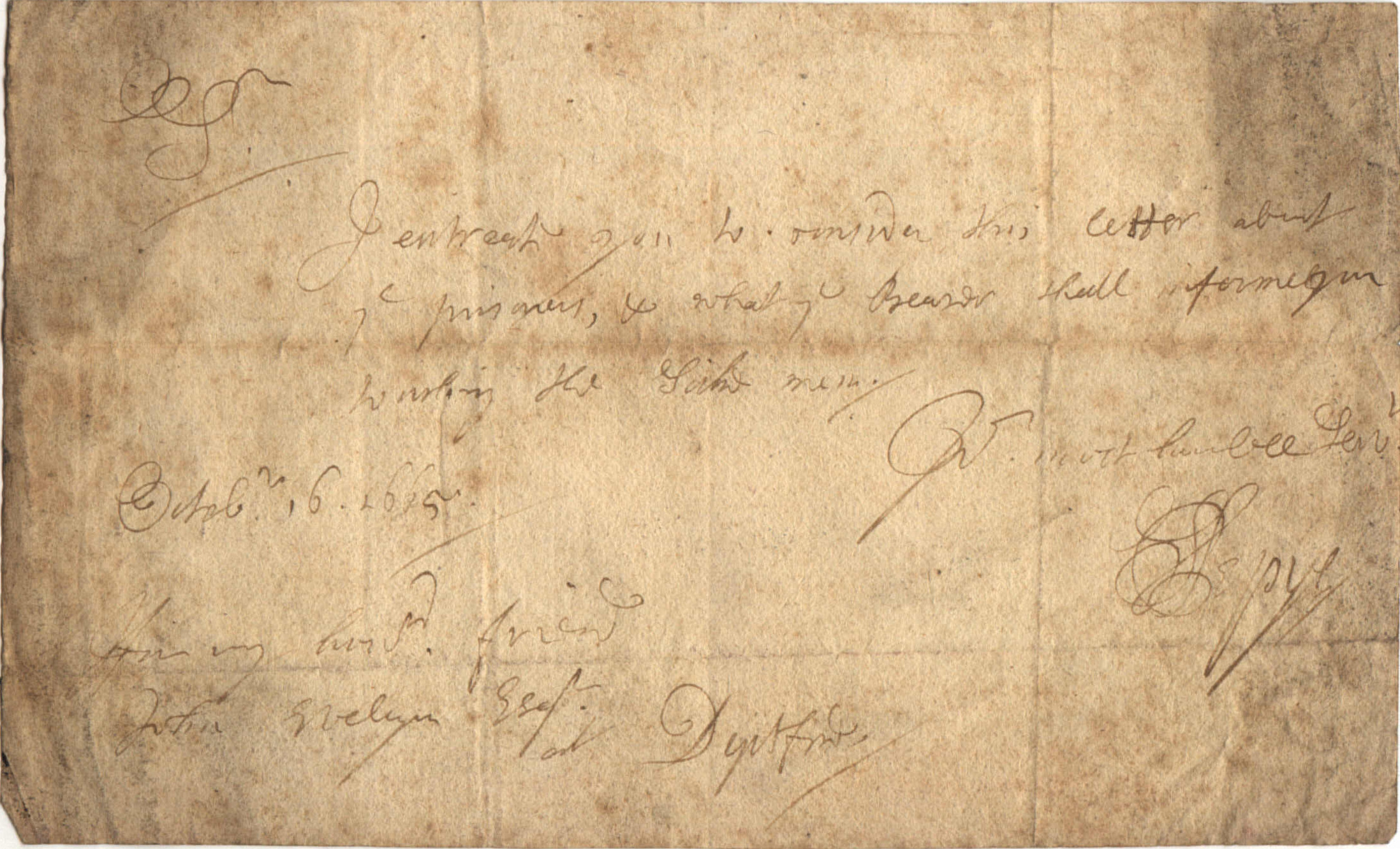
A short letter from Samuel Pepys to John Evelyn at the latter's home in Deptford, written by Pepys on 16 October 1665 and referring to "prisoners" and "sick men" during the Second Dutch War.

On the Navy Board, Pepys proved to be a more able and efficient worker than colleagues in higher positions. This often annoyed Pepys and provoked much harsh criticism in his diary. Among his colleagues were Admiral Sir William Penn, Sir George Carteret, Sir John Mennes and Sir William Batten.

Pepys learned arithmetic from a private tutor and used models of ships to make up for his lack of first-hand nautical experience, and ultimately came to play a significant role in the board's activities. In September 1660, he was made a Justice of the Peace; on 15 February 1662, Pepys was admitted as a Younger Brother of Trinity House; and on 30 April, he received the freedom of Portsmouth. Through Sandwich, he was involved in the administration of the short-lived English colony at Tangier. He joined the Tangier committee in August 1662 when the colony was first founded and became its treasurer in 1665. In 1663, he independently negotiated a £3,000 contract for Norwegian masts, demonstrating the freedom of action that his superior abilities allowed. He was appointed to a commission of the royal fishery on 8 April 1664.

Pepys's job required him to meet many people to dispense money and make contracts. He often laments how he "lost his labour" having gone to some appointment at a coffee house or tavern, only to discover that the person whom he was seeking was not there. These occasions were a constant source of frustration to Pepys.

Pepys increased his wealth substantially through corruption. In seven and a half years, his net worth rose by £7,500 on an annual salary of £350. In one instance, Pepys helped the career of a shipwright who provided sexual favours from his wife in return. Although he lived in a time when corruption was common, Pepys was not a minor practitioner in this.

=== Major events ===
Pepys's diary provides a first-hand account of the Restoration, and includes detailed accounts of several major events of the 1660s, along with the lesser known diary of John Evelyn. In particular, it is an invaluable source for the study of the Second Anglo-Dutch War of 1665–7, the Great Plague of 1665, and the Great Fire of London in 1666. In relation to the Plague and Fire, C. S. Knighton has written: "From its reporting of these two disasters to the metropolis in which he thrived, Pepys's diary has become a national monument." Robert Latham, editor of the definitive edition of the diary, remarks concerning the Plague and Fire: "His descriptions of both—agonisingly vivid—achieve their effect by being something more than superlative reporting; they are written with compassion. As always with Pepys it is people, not literary effects, that matter."

==== Second Anglo-Dutch War ====
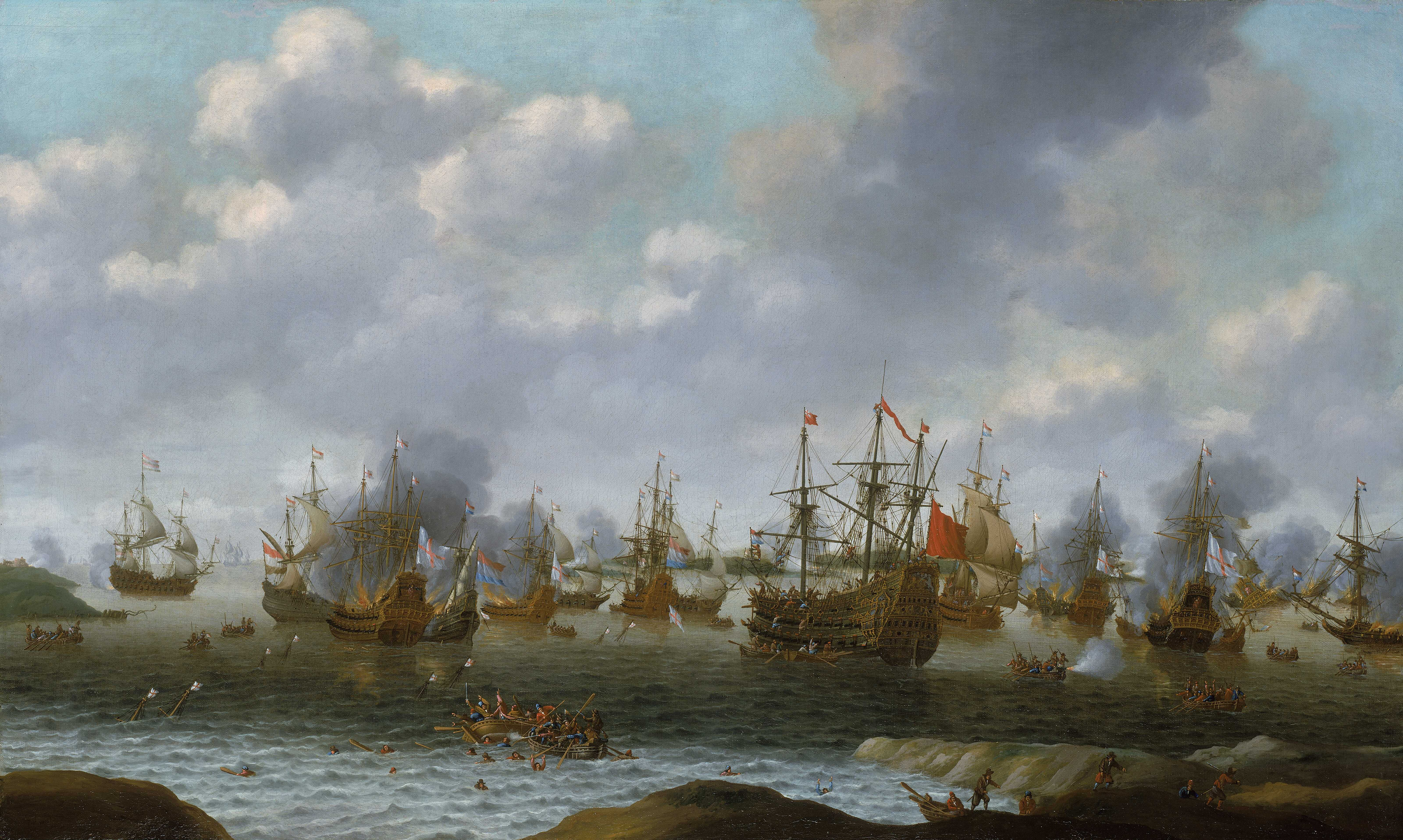
Dutch Attack on the Medway, June 1667 by Pieter Cornelisz van Soest, painted c. 1667. The captured English ship HMS Royal Charles (1650), bearing a red flag, is right of centre.

In early 1665, the start of the Second Anglo-Dutch War placed great pressure on Pepys. His colleagues were either engaged elsewhere or incompetent, and Pepys had to conduct a great deal of business himself. He excelled under the pressure, which was extreme due to the complexity and underfunding of the Royal Navy. At the outset, he proposed a centralised approach to supplying the fleet. His idea was accepted, and he was made surveyor-general of victualling in October 1665. The position brought a further £300 a year.

Pepys wrote about the Second Anglo-Dutch War: "In all things, in wisdom, courage, force and success, the Dutch have the best of us and do end the war with victory on their side". And King Charles II said: "Don't fight the Dutch, imitate them".

In 1667, with the war lost, Pepys helped to discharge the navy. The Dutch had defeated England on open water and now began to threaten English soil itself. In June 1667, they conducted their Raid on the Medway, broke the defensive chain at Gillingham, and towed away the Royal Charles, one of the Royal Navy's most important ships. As he had done during the Fire and the Plague, Pepys again removed his wife and his gold from London.

The Dutch raid was a major concern in itself, but Pepys was personally placed under a different kind of pressure: the Navy Board and his role as Clerk of the Acts came under scrutiny from the public and from Parliament. The war ended in August and, on 17 October, the House of Commons created a committee of "miscarriages". On 20 October, a list was demanded from Pepys of ships and commanders at the time of the division of the fleet in 1666. However, these demands were actually quite desirable for him, as tactical and strategic mistakes were not the responsibility of the Navy Board.

The Board did face some allegations regarding the Medway raid, but they could exploit the criticism already attracted by Commissioner of Chatham Peter Pett to deflect criticism from themselves. The committee accepted this tactic when they reported in February 1668. The Board was, however, criticised for its use of tickets to pay seamen. These tickets could only be exchanged for cash at the Navy's treasury in London. Pepys made a long speech at the bar of the Commons on 5 March 1668 defending this practice. It was, in the words of C. S. Knighton, a "virtuoso performance".

The commission was followed by an investigation led by a more powerful authority, the commissioners of accounts. They met at Brooke House, Holborn and spent two years scrutinising how the war had been financed. In 1669, Pepys had to prepare detailed answers to the committee's eight "Observations" on the Navy Board's conduct. In 1670, he was forced to defend his own role. A seaman's ticket with Pepys's name on it was produced as incontrovertible evidence of his corrupt dealings but, thanks to the intervention of the king, Pepys emerged from the sustained investigation relatively unscathed.

==== Great Plague ====
Outbreaks of plague were not unusual events in London; major epidemics had occurred in 1592, 1603, 1625 and 1636. Furthermore, Pepys was not among the groups of people who were most at risk. He did not live in cramped housing, he did not routinely mix with the poor, and he was not required to keep his family in London in the event of a crisis. It was not until June 1665 that the unusual seriousness of the plague became apparent, so Pepys's activities in the first five months of 1665 were not significantly affected by it. Claire Tomalin wrote that 1665 was, to Pepys, one of the happiest years of his life. He worked very hard that year, and the outcome was that he quadrupled his fortune. In his annual summary on 31 December, he wrote, "I have never lived so merrily (besides that I never got so much) as I have done this plague time".

Nonetheless, Pepys was certainly concerned about the plague. On 16 August he wrote:

But, Lord! how sad a sight it is to see the streets empty of people, and very few upon the 'Change. Jealous of every door that one sees shut up, lest it should be the plague; and about us two shops in three, if not more, generally shut up.

— Diary of Samuel Pepys, Wednesday, 16 August 1665.

He also chewed tobacco as a protection against infection, and worried that wig-makers might be using hair from the corpses as a raw material. Furthermore, it was Pepys who suggested that the Navy Office should evacuate to Greenwich, although he did offer to remain in town himself. He later took great pride in his stoicism. Meanwhile, Elisabeth Pepys was sent to Woolwich. She did not return to Seething Lane until January 1666 and was shocked by the sight of St Olave's churchyard, where 300 people had been buried.

==== Great Fire of London ====
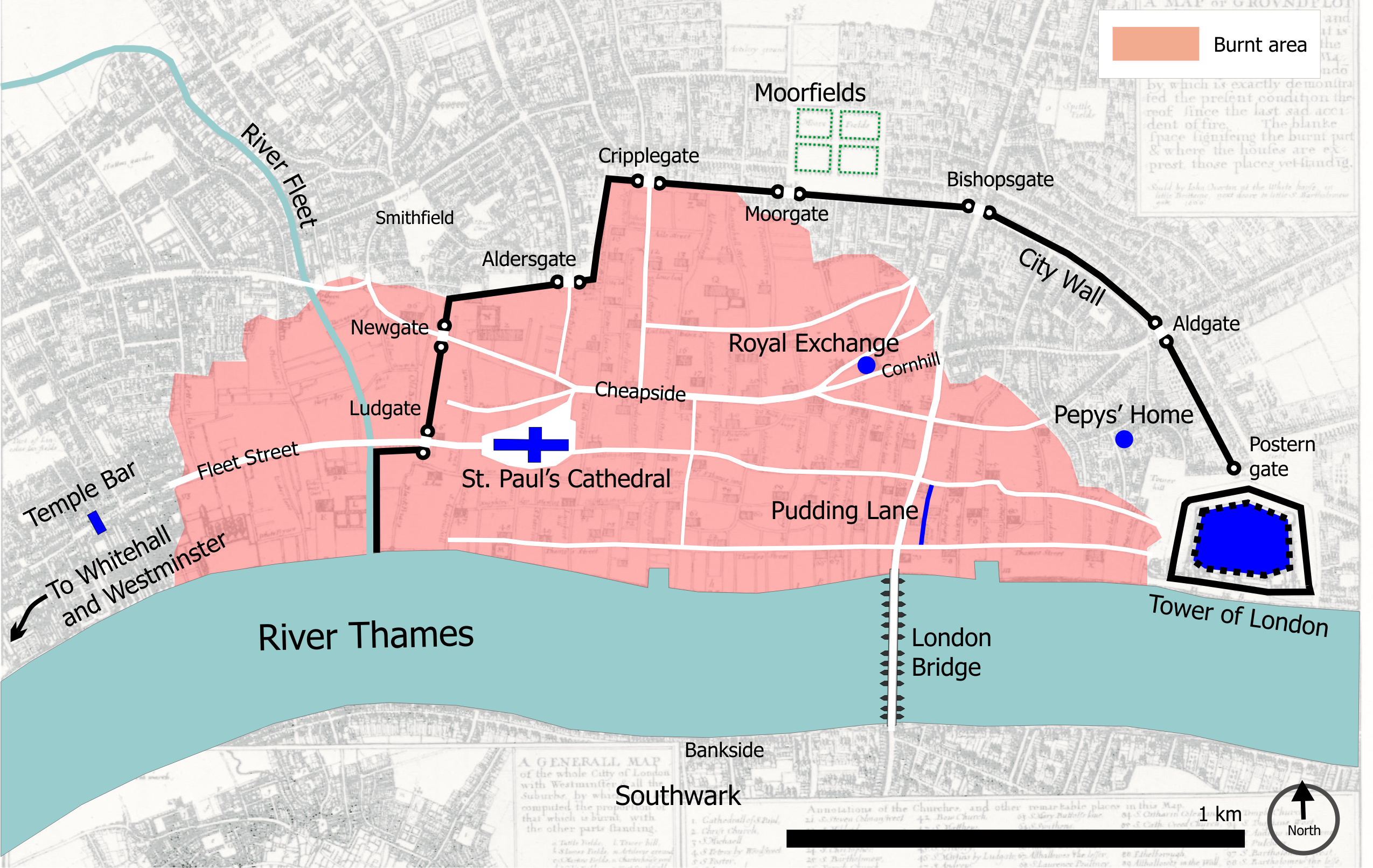
Map of London after the Great Fire in 1666, showing Pepys's home

In the early hours of 2 September 1666, Pepys was awakened by Jane the maid, his servant, who had spotted a fire in the Billingsgate area. He decided that the fire was not particularly serious and returned to bed. Shortly after waking, his servant returned and reported that 300 houses had been destroyed and that London Bridge was threatened. Pepys went to the Tower of London to get a better view. Without returning home, he took a boat and observed the fire for over an hour. In his diary, Pepys recorded his observations as follows:

I down to the water-side, and there got a boat and through bridge, and there saw a lamentable fire. Poor Michell's house, as far as the Old Swan, already burned that way, and the fire running further, that in a very little time it got as far as the Steeleyard, while I was there. Everybody endeavouring to remove their goods, and flinging into the river or bringing them into lighters that layoff; poor people staying in their houses as long as till the very fire touched them, and then running into boats, or clambering from one pair of stairs by the water-side to another. And among other things, the poor pigeons, I perceive, were loth to leave their houses, but hovered about the windows and balconys till they were, some of them burned, their wings, and fell down. Having staid, and in an hour's time seen the fire: rage every way, and nobody, to my sight, endeavouring to quench it, but to remove their goods, and leave all to the fire, and having seen it get as far as the Steele-yard, and the wind mighty high and driving it into the City; and every thing, after so long a drought, proving combustible, even the very stones of churches, and among other things the poor steeple by which pretty Mrs.———— lives, and whereof my old school-fellow Elborough is parson, taken fire in the very top, and there burned till it fell down...

— Diary of Samuel Pepys, Sunday, 2 September 1666.

The wind was driving the fire westward, so he ordered the boat to go to Whitehall and became the first person to inform the king of the fire. According to his entry of 2 September 1666, Pepys recommended to the king that homes be pulled down in the path of the fire in order to stem its progress. Accepting this advice, the king told him to go to Lord Mayor Thomas Bloodworth and tell him to start pulling down houses. Pepys took a coach back as far as St Paul's Cathedral before setting off on foot through the burning city. He found the Lord Mayor, who said, "Lord! what can I do? I am spent: people will not obey me. I have been pulling down houses; but the fire overtakes us faster than we can do it." At noon, he returned home and "had an extraordinary good dinner, and as merry, as at this time we could be", before returning to watch the fire in the city once more. Later, he returned to Whitehall, then met his wife in St James's Park. In the evening, they watched the fire from the safety of Bankside. Pepys writes that "it made me weep to see it". Returning home, Pepys met his clerk Tom Hayter who had lost everything. Hearing news that the fire was advancing, he started to pack up his possessions by moonlight.

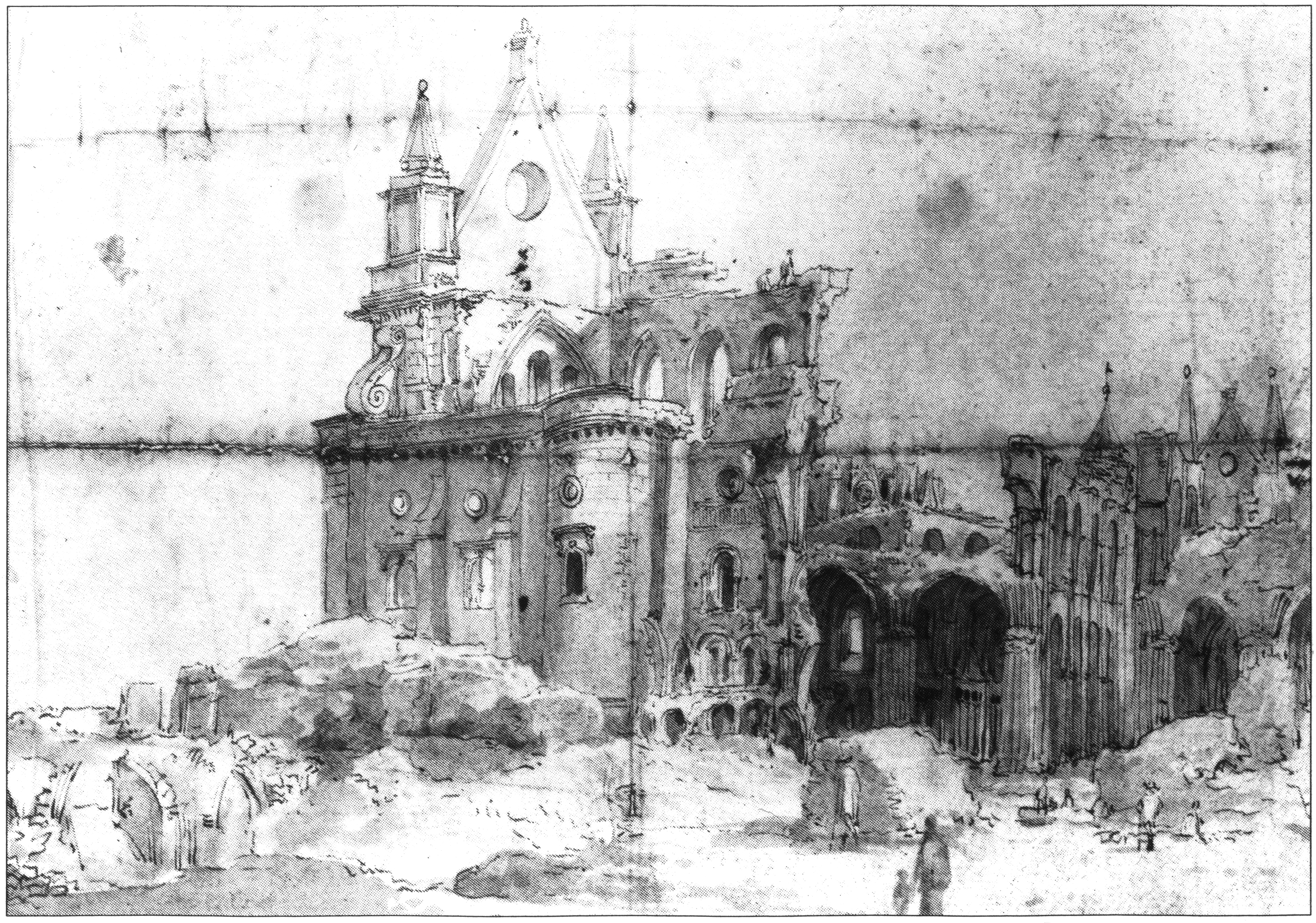
The ruins of the old St Paul's Cathedral, by Thomas Wyck, as it looked roughly seven years after the fire

A cart arrived at 4 a.m. on 3 September and Pepys spent much of the day arranging the removal of his possessions. Many of his valuables, including his diary, were sent to a friend from the Navy Office at Bethnal Green. At night, he "fed upon the remains of yesterday's dinner, having no fire nor dishes, nor any opportunity of dressing any thing." The next day, Pepys continued to arrange the removal of his possessions. By then, he believed that Seething Lane was in grave danger, so he suggested calling men from Deptford to help pull down houses and defend the king's property. He described the chaos in the city and his curious attempt at saving his own goods:

Sir W. Pen and I to Tower-streete, and there met the fire burning three or four doors beyond Mr. Howell's, whose goods, poor man, his trayes, and dishes, shovells, &c., were flung all along Tower-street in the kennels, and people working therewith from one end to the other; the fire coming on in that narrow streete, on both sides, with infinite fury. Sir W. Batten not knowing how to remove his wine, did dig a pit in the garden, and laid it in there; and I took the opportunity of laying all the papers of my office that I could not otherwise dispose of. And in the evening Sir W. Pen and I did dig another, and put our wine in it; and I my Parmazan cheese, as well as my wine and some other things.

— Diary of Samuel Pepys, Tuesday, 4 September 1666.

Pepys had taken to sleeping on his office floor; on Wednesday, 5 September, he was awakened by his wife at 2 a.m. She told him that the fire had almost reached All Hallows-by-the-Tower and that it was at the foot of Seething Lane. He decided to send her and his gold—about £2,350—to Woolwich. In the following days, Pepys witnessed looting, disorder, and disruption. On 7 September, he went to Paul's Wharf and saw the ruins of St Paul's Cathedral, of his old school, of his father's house, and of the house in which he had had his bladder stone removed. Despite all this destruction, Pepys's house, office, and diary were saved.

=== Personal life ===
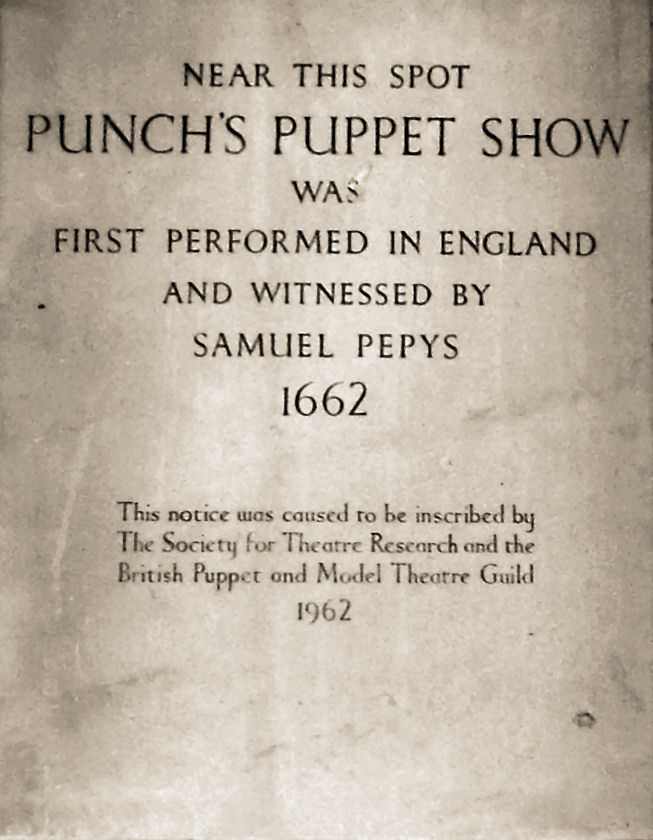
Plaque in St Paul's Church, Covent Garden, London commemorating Pepys as a witness to the first performance of the puppet show Punch and Judy in 1662

The diary gives a detailed account of Pepys's personal life. He was fond of wine, plays, and the company of other people. He also spent time evaluating his fortune and his place in the world. He was always curious and often acted on that curiosity, as he acted upon almost all his impulses. Periodically, he would resolve to devote more time to hard work instead of leisure. For example, in his entry for New Year's Eve, 1661, he writes: "I have newly taken a solemn oath about abstaining from plays and wine…" The following months reveal his lapses to the reader; by 17 February, it is recorded, "Here I drank wine upon necessity, being ill for the want of it."

Pepys was one of the most important civil servants of his age, and was also a widely cultivated man, taking an interest in books, music, the theatre, and science. Aside from English, he was fluent in French and read many texts in Latin. His favourite author was Virgil. He was passionately interested in music; he composed, sang, and played for pleasure, and even arranged music lessons for his servants. He played the lute, viol, violin, flageolet, recorder and spinet to varying degrees of proficiency. He was also a keen singer, performing at home, in coffee houses, and even in Westminster Abbey. He and his wife took flageolet lessons from master Thomas Greeting. He also taught his wife to sing and paid for dancing lessons for her (although these stopped when he became jealous of the dancing master).

Pepys was an investor in the Company of Royal Adventurers Trading to Africa, which held the Royal monopoly on trading along the west coast of Africa in gold, silver, ivory and slaves.

==== Sexual relations ====
Propriety did not prevent him from engaging in a number of extramarital liaisons with various women that were chronicled in his diary, often in some detail when relating the intimate details. The most dramatic of these encounters was with Deborah Willet, a young woman engaged as a companion for Elisabeth Pepys. On 25 October 1668, Pepys was surprised by his wife as he embraced Deb Willet; he writes that his wife "coming up suddenly, did find me imbracing the girl con [with] my hand sub [under] su [her] coats; and endeed I was with my main [hand] in her cunny. I was at a wonderful loss upon it and the girl also...." Following this event, he was characteristically filled with remorse, but (equally characteristically) continued to pursue Willet after she had been dismissed from the Pepys household. Pepys also had a habit of fondling the breasts of his maid Mary Mercer while she dressed him in the morning.

Pepys may also have dallied with a leading actress of the Restoration period, Mary Knep. "Mrs Knep was the wife of a Smithfield horsedealer, and the mistress of Pepys"—or at least "she granted him a share of her favours". Scholars disagree on the full extent of the Pepys/Knep relationship, but much of later generations' knowledge of Knep comes from the diary. Pepys first met Knep on 6 December 1665. He described her as "pretty enough, but the most excellent, mad-humoured thing, and sings the noblest that I ever heard in my life." He called her husband "an ill, melancholy, jealous-looking fellow" and suspected him of abusing his wife. Knep provided Pepys with backstage access and was a conduit for theatrical and social gossip. When they wrote notes to each other, Pepys signed himself "Dapper Dickey", while Knep was "Barbry Allen" (a popular song that was an item in her musical repertory). Pepys's reference to purchasing the pornographic book L'Escole des Filles appears to be the first English reference to pornography. He writes in his diary that it was a "mighty lewd book", and burned it after reading it.

Much of Pepys's behaviour towards women, which he catalogued himself in his diary, would today be considered sexual harassment, sexual assault, and rape. He wrote of using "force" or "great force" to achieve his sexual aims, sometimes causing injury to himself. He also described molesting women in their sleep. Despite his kindness and emotional loyalty towards some women in his life, Pepys ultimately believed men were entitled to the bodies of girls and women. Kate Loveman of Cambridge University describes this belief: "[In his diary] Pepys's sexual language of being 'kind', 'touching', and 'tumbling' emphasized his indulgence and playfulness, while masking coercion and violence; meanwhile, [his victim] Lane's claims of assault he regarded as exemplifying a woman's 'falseness', not because he thought there had been no violence, but because she had no moral right to protest."

=== Text of the diary ===
The diary was written in one of the many standard forms of shorthand used in Pepys's time, in this case called tachygraphy, and devised by Thomas Shelton. It is clear from its content that it was written as a purely personal record of his life and not for publication, yet there are indications that Pepys took steps to preserve the bound manuscripts of his diary. He wrote it out in fair copy from rough notes, and he also had the loose pages bound into six volumes, catalogued them in his library with all his other books, and is likely to have suspected that eventually someone would find them interesting.

=== Simplified Pepys family tree ===
This tree summarizes, in a more compact form and with a few additional details, trees published elsewhere in a box-like form. It is meant to help the reader of the Diary and also integrates some biographical information found in the same sources.

Simplified Pepys family tree
- William Pepys of Cottenham (Cambs.) (? – 1519)
  - Thomas Pepys
    - Richard Pepys (? – c. 1571)
      - William Pepys of Norwich, draper (1561 – c. 1639)
        - Richard Pepys of London, upholsterer (? – 1679)
  - John Pepys of South Creak (Norf.) (? – 1542)
    - Thomas Pepys (? – 1569)
      - Jerome Pepys (1548–1634)
        - John Pepys of Ashtead (Surrey), man of business to Chief Justice Edward Coke (1576–1652) +(1610)+ Anne Walpole
          - Edward Pepys of Broomsthorpe (Norf.), lawyer (1617–1663) + Elizabeth Walpole
          - Elizabeth Pepys + Thomas Dyke
          - Jane Pepys ("Madam Turner") (1623–1686) +(1650)+ John Turner, Yorkshire lawyer (1631–1689)
            - Charles Turner + Margaret Cholmley
            - Theophila Turner ("The") (1652–1702) +(1673)+ Sir Arthur Harris, 1st Baronet, of Stowford, M.P. for Okehampton (c. 1650 – 1686)
            - William Turner + Mary Foulis
            - Elizabeth Turner ("Betty") + William Hooker
  - William Pepys of Cottenham (Cambs.)
    - John Pepys of Cottenham and Impington (Cambs.) (? – 1589) (1) + ? ? (2) + Edith Talbot (? – 1583)
      - John Pepys^{1} (? – 1604) + Elizabeth Bendish of Essex
        - Sir Richard Pepys, M.P. for Sudbury and Lord Chief Justice of Ireland (1589–1659) (1) +(1620)+ Judith Cutte (2) + Mary Gosnold
          - Richard Pepys of Ashen (Essex), lawyer (? – 1664), ancestor of Charles Pepys, 1st Earl of Cottenham
          - Samuel Pepys of Dublin, clergyman
          - Elizabeth Pepys + Thomas Strudwick, confectioner
          - Judith Pepys (? – 1664) + Benjamin Scott, pewterer (? – 1664)
      - Thomas Pepys ("the Black")^{1} (? – 1606) + Mary Day
        - Robert Pepys of Brampton (Hunts.), bailiff at Hinchingbrooke (? – 1661) + Anne, widow Trice
        - Thomas Pepys of St Alphage (1595–1676) + Mary Syvret [Chiveret]
          - Thomas Pepys ("the turner"), trader with the W. Indies +(1664)+ Elizabeth Howes
          - Charles Pepys ("the joiner"), Master-Joiner with the Chatham yard (c. 1632 – c. 1701) +(1662)+ Joan, widow Smith
          - Mary Pepys (? – 1667) +(1662)+ Samuel de Santhune, weaver of Huguenot origin
        - Jane Pepys (? – 1666) + John Perkin of Parson Drove (Cambs.)
          - Jane Perkin
          - Frank Perkin, miller and fiddler
        - Mary Pepys (1597 – ?) + Robert Holcroft
          - John Holcroft
        - Edith Pepys ("Aunt Bell") (1599–1665) + John Bell
        - John Pepys, tailor in Salisbury Court (1601–1680) +(1626)+ Margaret Kite, washmaid (? – 1667)
          - Mary Pepys (1627–1640)
          - Paulina Pepys (1628–1632)
          - Esther Pepys (1630–1631)
          - John Pepys (1632–1640)
          - Samuel Pepys, diarist, naval administrator, and M.P. for Castle Rising and Harwich (1633–1703) +(1655)+ Élisabeth de Saint-Michel, born from an Anglo-French wedding, of Angevin gentry by her father (1640–1669)
          - Thomas Pepys ("Tom"), tailor against his will (1634–1664)
            - Elizabeth Taylor, an illegitimate daughter with his maid Margeret
          - Sarah Pepys (1635–1641)
          - Jacob Pepys (1637–1637)
          - Robert Pepys (1638–1638)
          - Paulina Pepys ("Pall") (1640–1689) +(1668)+ John Jackson, farmer in Ellington (Hunts.) (? – 1680)
            - Samuel Jackson (1669 – ?)
            - John Jackson, secretary and heir to SP (1673–1724) + Anne Edgeley
              - John Jackson (? – 1780)
              - 1 other son and 2 daughters
              - Anne Jackson + Brabazon Hallows
              - Paulina Jackson + Admiral R. Collins
              - Frances Jackson (1722–1769) +(1747)+ John Cockerell of Bishops Hull (Somer.) (1714–1767)
                - John Cockerell
                - Charles Cockerell
                - Samuel Pepys Cockerell, architect (1754–1827)
                  - Charles Robert Cockerell, architect (1788–1863) +(1828)+ Anna Rennie (1803–1872)
                    - Frederick Pepys Cockerell, architect (1833–1878) +(1867)+ Mary Mulock
                      - 6 children
                    - 9 other children
            - 2 other children dead in infancy
          - John Pepys, naval administrator, unmarr. (1642–1677)
      - Thomas Pepys ("the Red")^{1} of Hatcham Barnes (Surrey) (? – 1615) + Kezia ?
        - Thomas Pepys ("the Executor"), lawyer (1611–1675) (1) +(1654)+ Anne Cope (2) +(1660)+ Ursula Stapleton (? – c. 1693)
          - 1 son and 1 daughter by the second wedding
        - Elizabeth Pepys +(1633)+ Percival Angier, business man (? – 1665)
      - Elizabeth Pepys^{1} +(1593)+ Henry Alcock
        - issue
      - Apollo Pepys^{1} (1576–1645)
      - Paulina Pepys^{2} (1581–1638) +(1618)+ Sidney Montagu (? – 1644)
        - Elizabeth Montagu (1620 – ?) +(1638)+ Sir Gilbert Pickering, 1st Baronet, Lord Chamberlain to Oliver and Richard Cromwell (1613–1668)
          - Elizabeth Pickering +(1668)+ John Creed, secretary to Edward Montagu and SP's principal rival (? – 1701)
            - 11 children
          - 11 other children
        - Henry Montagu (1622–1625)
        - Edward Montagu, 1st Earl of Sandwich ("My Lord") (1625–1672) +(1642)+ Jemima Crew ("My Lady") (1625–1674)
          - Jemima Montagu ("Lady Jem") (1646–1671) +(1665)+ Philip Carteret, commissioned lieutenant in the Navy (1643–1672)
            - George Carteret, 1st Baron Carteret, (1667–1695) + Lady Grace Granville (1654–1744)
              - John Carteret, 2nd Earl Granville, Prime Minister to George II (1690–1763) + Lady Frances Worsley
            - 2 other sons
          - Edward Montagu, 2nd Earl of Sandwich ("Ned") (1648–1688) +(1668)+ Lady Anne Boyle (? – 1671)
            - descent of the Earls of Sandwich
          - Paulina Montagu (1649–1669)
          - Sidney Montagu, later Wortley-Montagu (1650–1727) + ? ?, Yorkshire heiress
            - issue
          - Anne Montagu (1653–1729) (1) +(1671)+ Richard Edgcumbe (1640–1688) (2) + Christopher Montagu
          - Oliver Montagu (1655–1693)
          - John Montagu, Dean of Durham (1655–1729)
          - Charles Montagu (1658–1721) (1) + Elizabeth Forester (2) + Sarah Rogers
            - issue by both weddings
          - Catherine Montagu (1661–1757) (1) + Nicholas Bacon, M.P. for Ipswich (1622–1687) (2) + Balthazar Gardeman, clergyman
          - James Montagu (1664 – ?)
      - Talbot Pepys^{2} of Impington (Cambs.), Recorder and M.P. for Cambridge, remarried 3 times (1583–1666) + Beatrice Castell
        - Roger Pepys of Impington (Cambs.), Recorder and M.P. for Cambridge (1617–1688) (1) + Anne Banks (2) +(c. 1646)+ Barbara Bacon (? – 1657) (3) + Parnell Duke (4) +(1669)+ Esther, widow Dickenson ("the good-humoured fat widow")
          - Talbot Pepys^{2} (1647–1681)
          - Barbara Pepys ("Bab")^{2} (1649–1689) +(1674)+ Dr Thomas Gale, High Master of St Paul's School and Dean of York (1635–1702)
            - Charles Gale
            - Thomas Gale
            - Elizabeth Gale
            - Roger Gale, antiquary (1672–1744)
            - Samuel Gale, antiquary (1682–1754)
          - Elizabeth Pepys ("Betty")^{2} (1651–1716) +(1680)+ Charles Long, fellow of Caius College and rector of Risby (Suff.)
          - John Pepys^{3}
        - Dr John Pepys, fellow of Trinity Hall and lawyer (1618–1692) + Catherine, widow Hobson
        - Dr Thomas Pepys, physician, poorly appreciated by SP, unmarr.
        - Paulina Pepys + Hammond Claxton of Booton (Norf.)

== After the diary ==
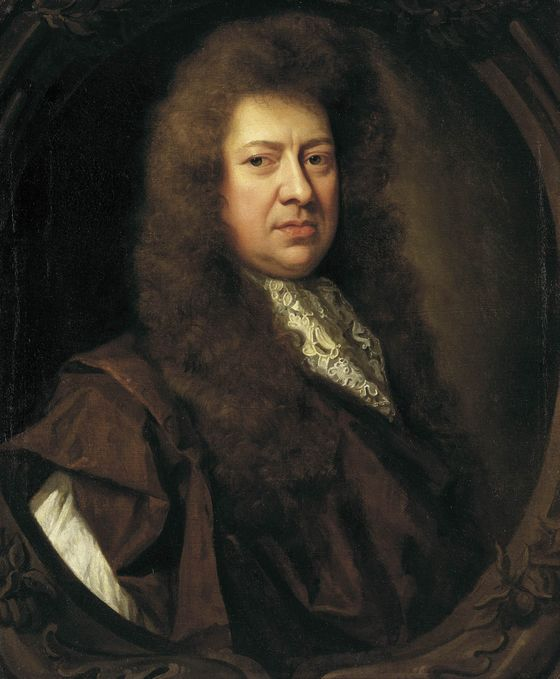
Samuel Pepys painted by Sir Godfrey Kneller in 1689

Pepys's health suffered from the long hours that he worked throughout the period of the diary. Specifically, he believed that his eyesight had been affected by his work. (Note: In Latham and Matthews's Companion to the diary, Martin Howard Stein suggests that Pepys suffered from a combination of astigmatism and long sight.) He reluctantly concluded in his last entry, dated 31 May 1669, that he should completely stop writing for the sake of his eyes, and only dictate to his clerks from then on, (Note: One of his clerks was Paul Lorrain who became well known as Ordinary of Newgate Prison.) which meant that he could no longer keep his diary.

Pepys and his wife took a holiday to France and the Low Countries in June–October 1669; on their return, Elisabeth fell ill and died on 10 November 1669. Pepys erected a monument to her in the church of St Olave's, Hart Street, London. Pepys never remarried, but he did have a long-term housekeeper named Mary Skinner who was assumed by many of his contemporaries to be his mistress and sometimes referred to as Mrs. Pepys. In his will, he left her an annuity of £200 and many of his possessions.

=== Member of Parliament and Secretary of the Admiralty ===
In 1672, he became an Elder Brother of Trinity House and served in this capacity until 1689; he was Master of Trinity House in 1676–1677 and again in 1685–1686. In 1673, he was promoted to Secretary of the Admiralty Commission and elected MP for Castle Rising in Norfolk.

In 1673, he was involved with the establishment of the Royal Mathematical School at Christ's Hospital, which was to train 40 boys annually in navigation, for the benefit of the Royal Navy and the English Merchant Navy. In 1675, he was appointed a Governor of Christ's Hospital and for many years he took a close interest in its affairs. Among his papers are two detailed memoranda on the administration of the school. In 1699, after the successful conclusion of a seven-year campaign to get the master of the Mathematical School replaced by a man who knew more about the sea, he was rewarded for his service as a Governor by being made a Freeman of the City of London. He also served as Master (without ever having been a Freeman or Liveryman) of the Clothworkers' Company (1677–8).

At the beginning of 1679, Pepys was elected MP for Harwich in Charles II's third parliament which formed part of the Cavalier Parliament. He was elected along with Sir Anthony Deane, a Harwich alderman and leading naval architect, to whom Pepys had been a patron since 1662. By May of that year, they were under attack from their political enemies. Pepys resigned as Secretary of the Admiralty. They were imprisoned in the Tower of London on suspicion of treasonable correspondence with France, specifically leaking naval intelligence. The charges are believed to have been fabricated under the direction of Anthony Ashley-Cooper, 1st Earl of Shaftesbury. Pepys was accused, among other things, of being a secret member of the Catholic Church in England. Pepys and Deane were released in July, but proceedings against them were not dropped until June 1680.

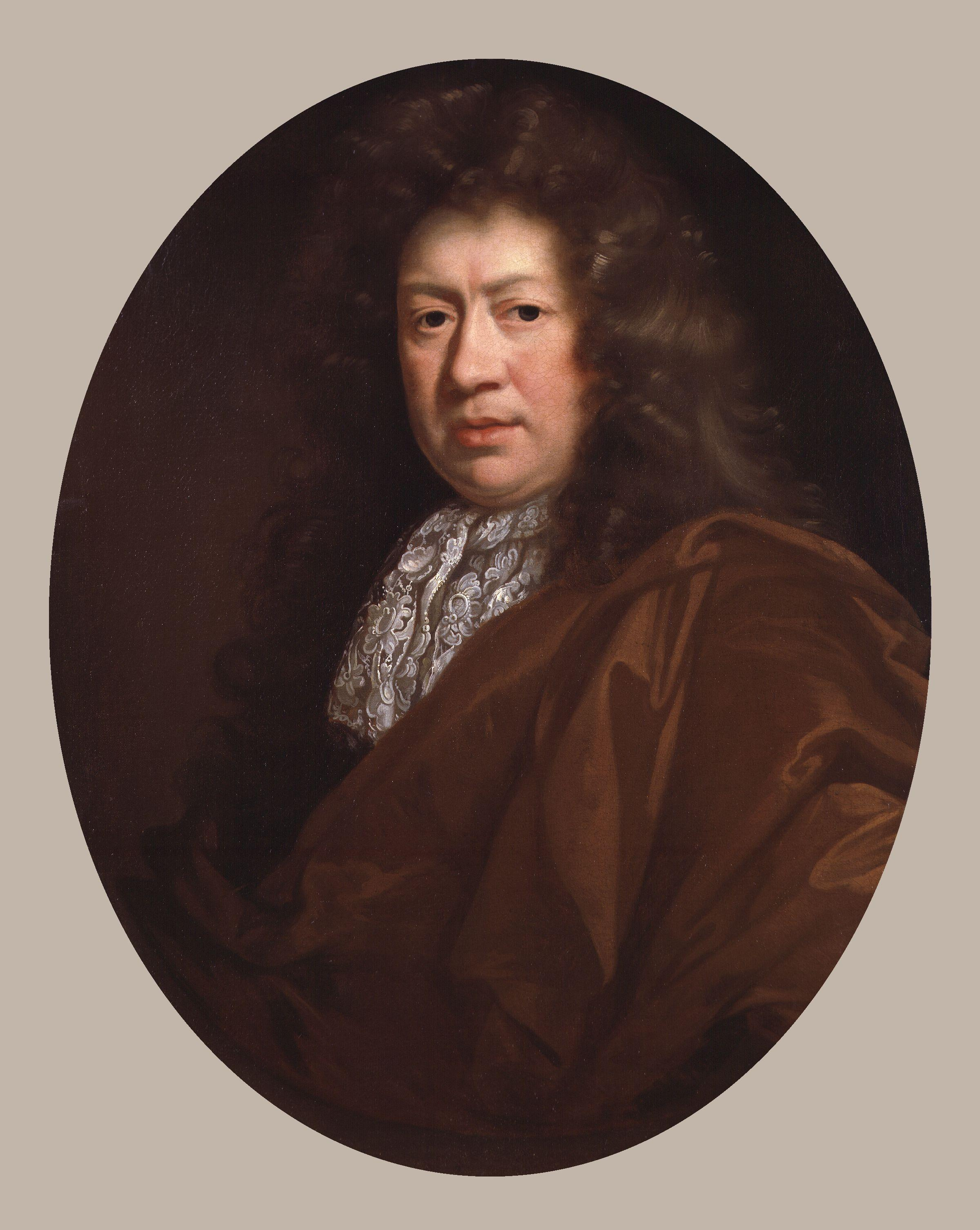
Pepys painted by John Closterman in the 1690s

Though he had resigned from the Tangier committee in 1679, in 1683 he was sent to Tangier to assist Lord Dartmouth with the evacuation and abandonment of the English colony. After six months' service, he travelled back through Spain accompanied by the naval engineer Edmund Dummer, returning to England after a particularly rough passage on 30 March 1684. In June 1684, once more in favour, he was appointed King's Secretary for the affairs of the Admiralty, a post that he retained after the death of Charles II (February 1685) and the accession of James II. The phantom Pepys Island, alleged to be near South Georgia, was named after him in 1684, having been first "discovered" during his tenure at the Admiralty.

From 1685 to 1688, he was active not only as Secretary of the Admiralty, but also as MP for Harwich. He had been elected MP for Sandwich, but this election was contested and he immediately withdrew to Harwich. When James fled the country at the end of 1688, Pepys's career also came to an end. In January 1689, he was defeated in the parliamentary election at Harwich; in February, one week after the accession of William III and Mary II, he resigned his secretaryship.

=== Royal Society ===
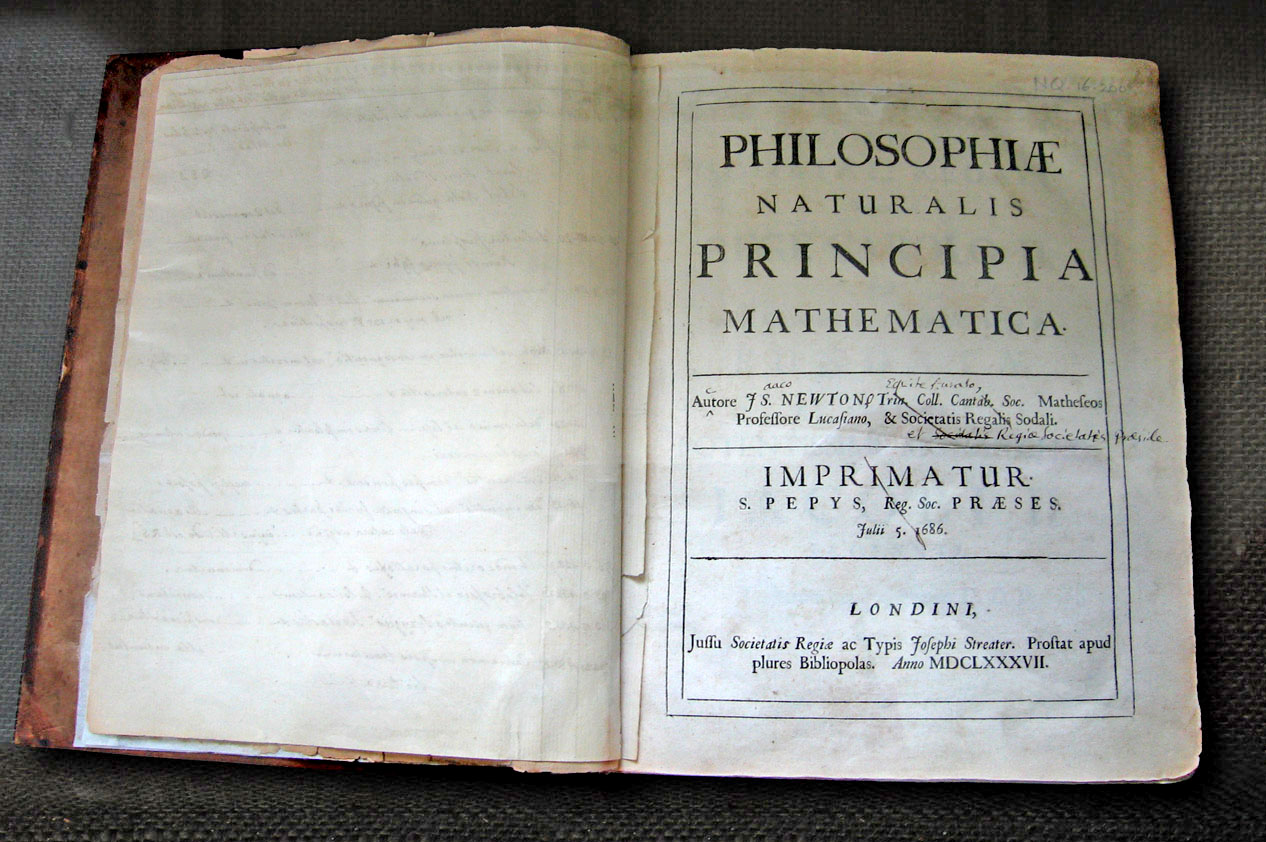
Isaac Newton's personal copy of the first edition of his Principia Mathematica, with the imprimatur in Pepys's name

He was elected a Fellow of the Royal Society in 1665 and served as its President from 1 December 1684 to 30 November 1686. Isaac Newton's Principia Mathematica was published during this period, and the imprimatur on the book's title page is signed by Pepys in his role as president. There is a probability problem called the "Newton–Pepys problem" that arose out of correspondence between Newton and Pepys about whether one is more likely to roll at least one six with six dice or at least two sixes with twelve dice. It has only recently been noted that the gambling advice that Newton gave Pepys was correct, while the logical argument with which Newton accompanied it was unsound.

=== Retirement and death ===
He was imprisoned on suspicion of Jacobitism from May to July 1689 and again in June 1690, but no charges were ever successfully brought against him. After his release, he retired from public life at age 57. He moved out of London ten years later (1701) to a house in Clapham owned by his friend William Hewer, who had begun his career working for Pepys in the admiralty. Clapham was in the country at the time; it is now part of inner London.

Pepys lived there until his death on 26 May 1703. He had no children and bequeathed his estate to his unmarried nephew John Jackson. Pepys had disinherited his nephew Samuel Jackson for marrying contrary to his wishes. When John Jackson died in 1724, Pepys's estate reverted to Anne, daughter of Archdeacon Samuel Edgeley, niece of Will Hewer and sister of Hewer Edgeley, nephew and godson of Pepys's old Admiralty employee and friend Will Hewer. Hewer was also childless and left his immense estate to his nephew Hewer Edgeley (consisting mostly of the Clapham property, as well as lands in Clapham, London, Westminster, and Norfolk) on condition that the nephew (and godson) would adopt the surname Hewer. So Will Hewer's heir became Hewer Edgeley-Hewer, and he adopted the old Will Hewer home in Clapham as his residence. That is how the Edgeley family acquired the estates of both Samuel Pepys and Will Hewer, with sister Anne inheriting Pepys's estate, and brother Hewer inheriting that of Will Hewer. On the death of Hewer Edgeley-Hewer in 1728, the old Hewer estate went to Edgeley-Hewer's widow Elizabeth, who left the 432-acre (175-hectare) estate to Levett Blackborne, the son of Abraham Blackborne, merchant of Clapham, and other family members, who later sold it off in lots. Lincoln's Inn barrister Levett Blackborne also later acted as attorney in legal scuffles for the heirs who had inherited the Pepys estate.

Pepys's former protégé and friend Hewer acted as the executor of Pepys's estate.

Pepys was buried along with his wife in St Olave's Church, Hart Street in London.

== Pepys Library ==
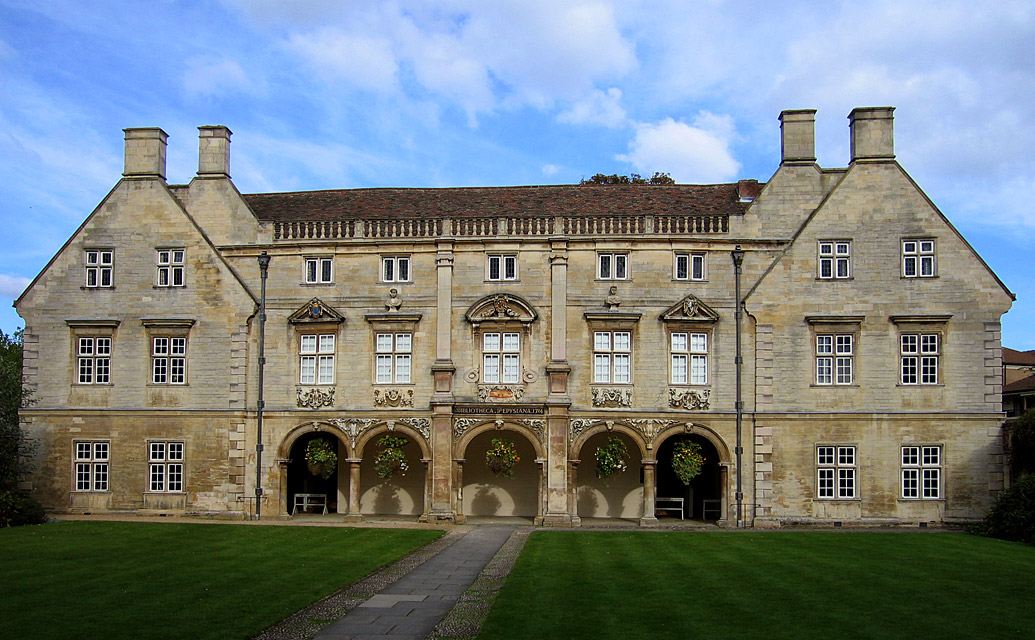
The Pepys Building of Magdalene College, Cambridge

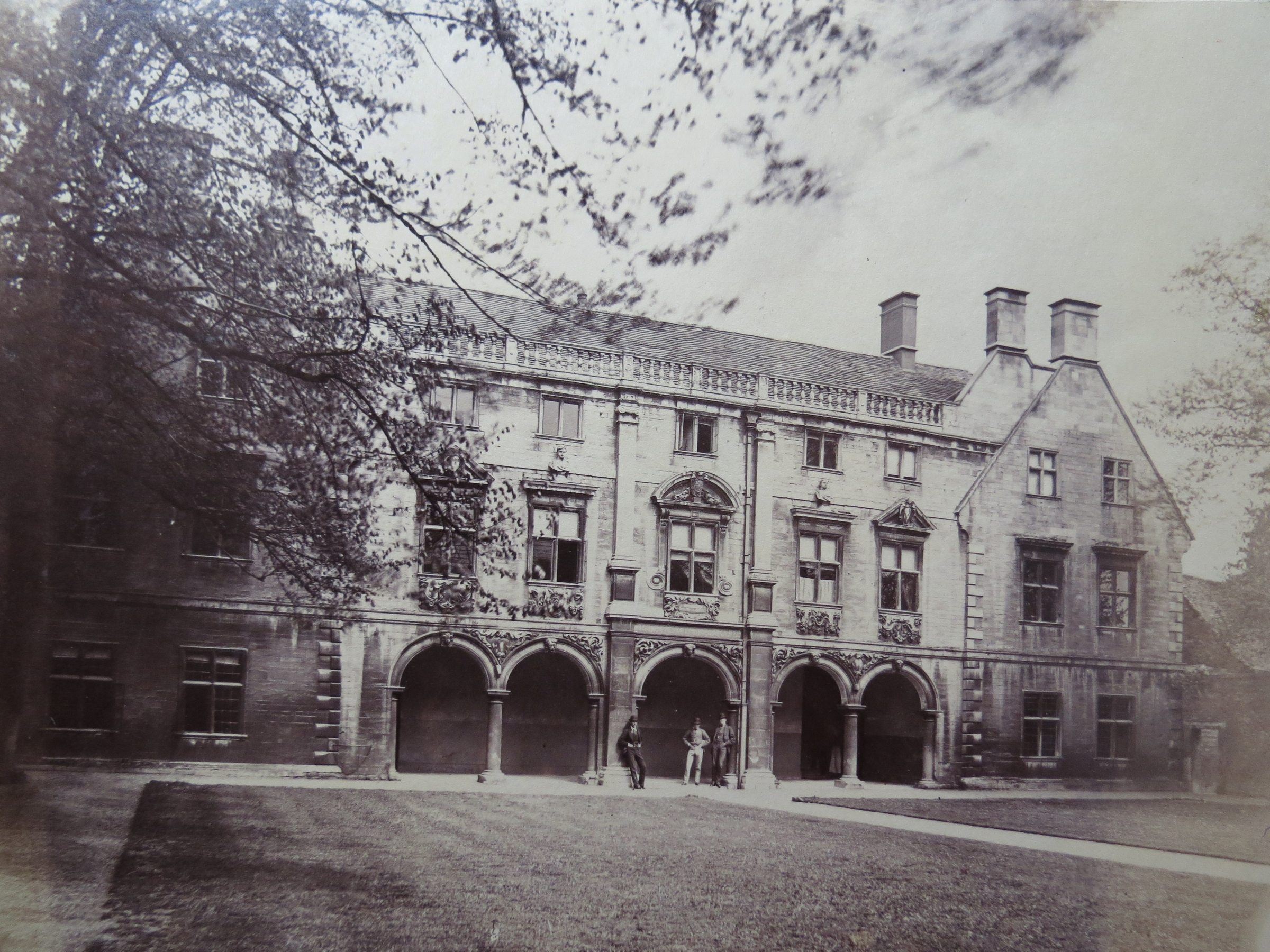
Pepys Library c. 1870

Pepys was a lifelong bibliophile and carefully nurtured his large collection of books, manuscripts, and prints. At his death, there were more than 3,000 volumes, including the diary, all carefully catalogued and indexed; they form one of the most important surviving 17th-century private libraries. The most important items in the Library are the six original bound manuscripts of Pepys's diary, but there are other remarkable holdings, including:

- Incunabula by William Caxton, Wynkyn de Worde and Richard Pynson
- Sixty medieval manuscripts
- The Pepys Manuscript, a late-15th-century English choirbook
- Naval records such as two of the 'Anthony Rolls', illustrating the Royal Navy's ships c. 1546, including the Mary Rose
- Sir Francis Drake's personal almanac
- Over 1,800 printed ballads, one of the finest collections in existence.

The library includes an extensive collection of documents relating to the administration of the navy in Pepys's time. These have been used as a dominant source for understanding how the navy was governed and the level of influence exerted by those involved. Comparison of notes made by Pepys's brother John of a meeting on 22 July 1676 with the official minutes taken by Samuel calls into question the completeness and accuracy of the latter. For instance, the official minutes make no mention that the Duke of York even attended, when John's notes make clear that the Duke was an active participant. The suggestion is made that Samuel Pepys's naval journal presents a "flawed and incomplete picture" of how the navy was run in the 1670s, despite it being a key source, widely cited by historians.

Pepys made detailed provisions in his will for the preservation of his book collection. His nephew and heir John Jackson died in 1723, when it was transferred intact to Magdalene College, Cambridge, where it can be seen in the Pepys Library. The bequest included all the original bookcases and his elaborate instructions that placement of the books "be strictly reviewed and, where found requiring it, more nicely adjusted".

The Ephemera Society emblem uses Pepys's portrait and characterizes him as "the first general ephemerist." Two large albums of ephemera saved by Pepys are in his library.

== Publication history of the diary ==
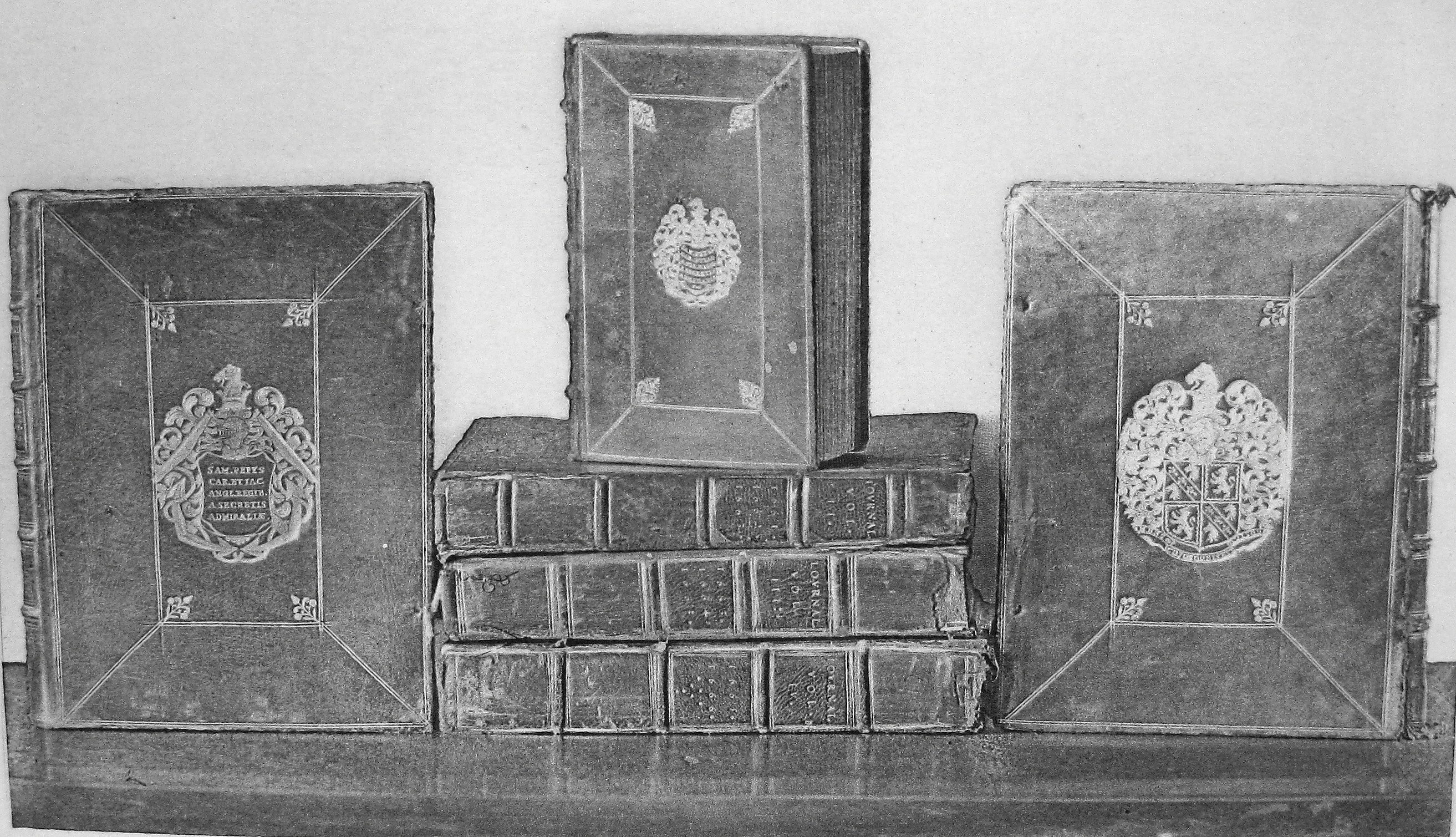
The six volumes of the diary manuscript

Motivated by the publication of John Evelyn's Diary in 1818, Lord Granville deciphered a few pages. John Smith (later the Rector of St Mary the Virgin in Baldock) was then engaged to transcribe the diaries into plain English. He laboured at this task for three years, from 1819 to 1822, unaware until nearly finished that a key to the shorthand system was stored in Pepys's library a few shelves above the diary volumes. Others had apparently succeeded in reading the diary earlier, perhaps knowing about the key, because a work of 1812 quotes from a passage of it. Smith's transcription, which is also kept in the Pepys Library, was the basis for the first published edition of the diary, edited by Lord Braybrooke, released in two volumes in 1825 along with selected correspondence. The second edition was brought out in 1828. An enlarged third edition was published in 1848. The fourth edition was published in 1854.

A second transcription, done with the benefit of the key but often less accurately, was completed in 1875 by Mynors Bright and published in 1875–1879. This added about a third to the previously published text, but still left only about 80% of the diary in print. Henry B. Wheatley, drawing on both his predecessors, produced a new edition in 1893–1899, revised in 1926 with extensive notes and an index.

All of these editions omitted passages (chiefly about Pepys's sexual adventures) that the editors thought were too obscene ever to be printed. Wheatley, in the preface to his edition, noted, "a few passages which cannot possibly be printed. It may be thought by some that these omissions are due to an unnecessary squeamishness, but it is not really so, and readers are therefore asked to have faith in the judgement of the editor." Wheatley claims to have indicated all such omissions with an ellipsis, but comparison with the modern text indicates that he did not always do this, and that he silently bowdlerised a number of words.

The complete, unexpurgated, and definitive edition, edited and transcribed by Robert Latham and William Matthews, was published by Bell & Hyman, London, and the University of California Press, Berkeley, in nine volumes, along with separate Companion and Index volumes, over the years 1970–1983. Various single-volume abridgements of this text are also available.

The Introduction in Volume I provides a scholarly but readable account of "The Diarist", "The Diary" ("The Manuscript", "The Shorthand", and "The Text"), "History of Previous Editions", "The Diary as Literature", and "The Diary as History". The Companion provides a long series of detailed essays about Pepys and his world.

The first unabridged recording of the diary as an audiobook was published in 2015 by Naxos AudioBooks.

On 1 January 2003 Phil Gyford started a weblog, pepysdiary.com, that serialised the diary one day each evening together with annotations from the public and experts alike. In December 2003 the blog won the best specialist blog award in The Guardian's Best of British Blogs. In 2021, Gyford noted the existence of the Samuel Pepys Twitter account; set up in 2008, the account similarly serialises Pepys's diary each day.

== Adaptations ==
In 1958, the BBC produced a serial called The Diary of Samuel Pepys, in which Peter Sallis played the title role. In 2003, a television film, The Private Life of Samuel Pepys aired on BBC2, in which Steve Coogan played Pepys. The 2004 film Stage Beauty concerns London theatre in the 17th century and is based on Jeffrey Hatcher's play Compleat Female Stage Beauty, which in turn was inspired by a reference in Pepys's diary to the actor Edward Kynaston, who played female roles in the days when women were forbidden to appear on stage. Pepys is a character in the film and is portrayed as an ardent devotee of the theatre. Hugh Bonneville plays Pepys. Daniel Mays portrays Pepys in The Great Fire, a 2014 BBC television miniseries. Pepys has also been portrayed in various other film and television productions, played by diverse actors including Mervyn Johns, Michael Palin, Michael Graham Cox and Philip Jackson.

BBC Radio 4 has broadcast serialised radio dramatisations of the diary. In the 1990s it was performed as a Classic Serial starring Bill Nighy, and in the 2010s it was serialised as part of the Woman's Hour radio magazine programme. One audiobook edition of Pepys's diary selections is narrated by Kenneth Branagh. A fictionalised Pepys narrates the second chapter of Harry Turtledove's science fiction novel A Different Flesh (serialised 1985–1988, book form 1988). This chapter is entitled "And So to Bed" and written in the form of entries from the Pepys diary. The entries detail Pepys's encounter with American Homo erectus specimens (imported to London as beasts of burden) and his formation of the "transformational theory of life", thus causing evolutionary theory to gain a foothold in scientific thought in the 17th century rather than the 19th. Deborah Swift's 2017 novel Pleasing Mr Pepys is described as a "re-imagining of the events in Samuel Pepys's Diary". The 2022 book The Lost Diary of Samuel Pepys by Jack Jewers imagined a secret continuation of Pepys's diaries, in which he became an unwilling agent for the crown. The novel, which was named a Sunday Times historical fiction book of the year, is to be followed by a sequel, The King's Man, in 2025.

== Biographical studies ==
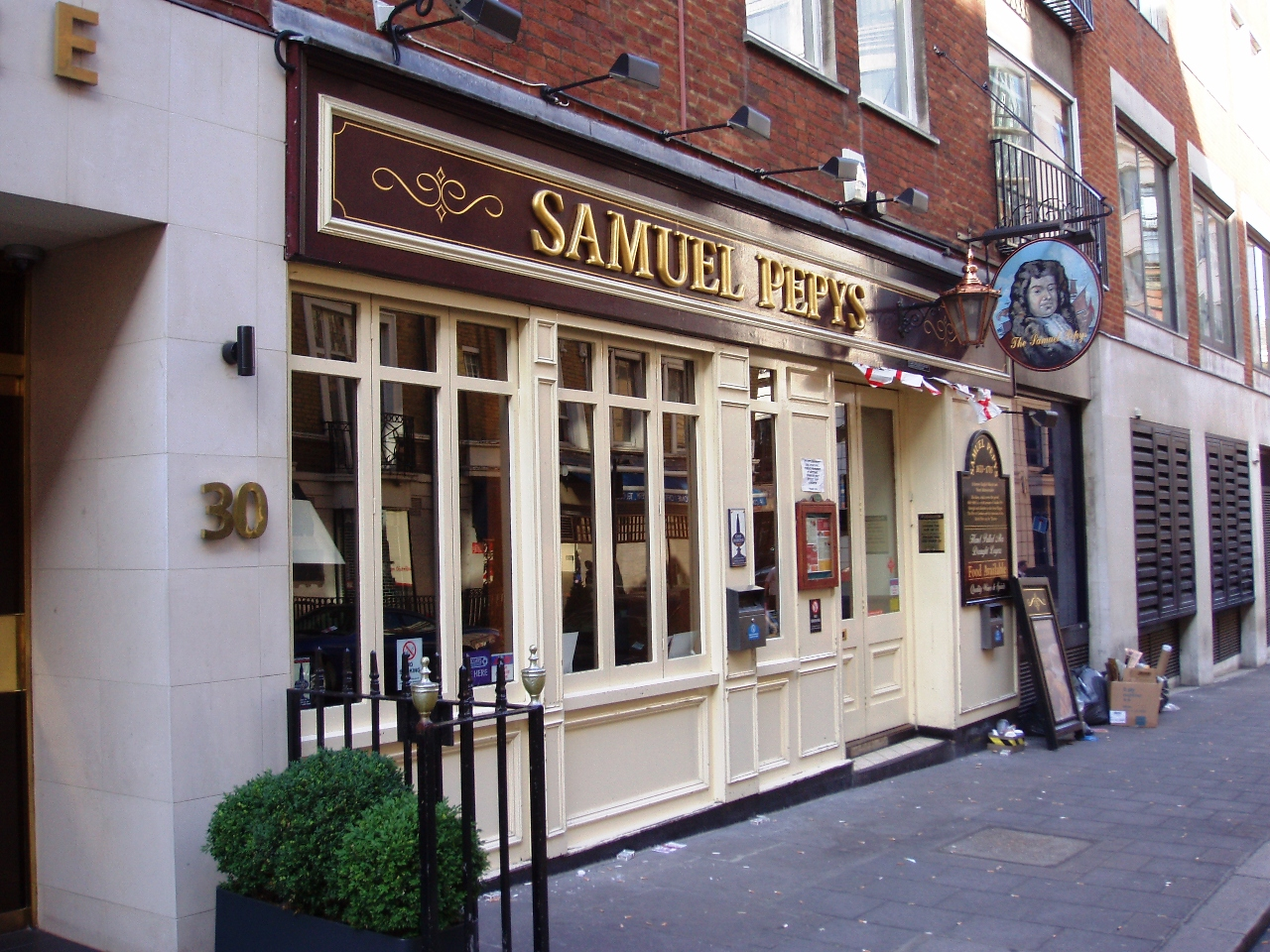
This pub in Mayfair was named after Pepys; it closed in 2008.

Several detailed studies of Pepys's life are available. Arthur Bryant published his three-volume study in 1933–1938, long before the definitive edition of the diary, but, thanks to Bryant's lively style, it is still of interest. In 1974, Richard Ollard produced a new biography that drew on Latham's and Matthew's work on the text, benefiting from the author's deep knowledge of Restoration politics. Other biographies include: Samuel Pepys: A Life, by Stephen Coote (London: Hodder & Stoughton, 2000) and, Samuel Pepys and His World, by Geoffrey Trease (London: Thames and Hudson, 1972).

The most recent general study, Samuel Pepys: The Unequalled Self, is by Claire Tomalin. Tomalin's book won the 2002 Whitbread Book of the Year award, the judges calling it a "rich, thoughtful and deeply satisfying" account that unearths "a wealth of material about the uncharted life of Samuel Pepys".

== Arms ==
Coat of arms of Samuel Pepys
Crest A camel's head erased bridled and lined ducally gorged. Escutcheon Quarterly 1 & 4. On a bend between two horses heads erased three fleurs de lys (Pepys) 2 & 3. A lion rampant within a bordure engrailed (Talbot). Motto Mens Cujusque Is Est Quisque

== See also ==
- John Evelyn – contemporary diarist
- Rota Club
- Samuel Pepys Club
- List of diarists
- List of presidents of the Royal Society

== Bibliography ==
=== Editions of letters and other publications ===
- Wheatley, Henry B., ed. (1893). The Diary of Samuel Pepys M.A. F.R.S. London: George Bell & Sons.
- Tanner, Joseph Robson, ed. (1906) [1690]. The Memoires of the Royal Navy. London: Ben Griffin.
- Tanner, Joseph Robson, ed. (1926). Naval Minutes. London: The Naval Records Society.
- Tanner, Joseph Robson, ed. (1926). Private Correspondence and Miscellaneous Papers. London: George Bell & Sons.
- Tanner, Joseph Robson, ed. (1929). Further Correspondence. London: George Bell & Sons.
- Pepys, Samuel (1933) Edwin Chappell ed. The Shorthand letters of Samuel Pepys Cambridge University Press
- Pepys, Samuel (1955) Helen Truesdell Heath ed. The letters of Samuel Pepys and his family circle Oxford, Clarendon Press
- Pepys, Samuel (1995) Robert Latham ed. Samuel Pepys and the Second Dutch War. Pepys's Navy White Book and Brooke House Papers Aldershot: Scholar Press for the Navy Records Society [Publications, Vol 133] ISBN 1-85928-136-2
- Pepys, Samuel (2005). Guy de la Bedoyere (ed.). Particular friends: the correspondence of Samuel Pepys and John Evelyn (2nd ed.). Woodbridge: Boydell & Brewer. ISBN 1-84383-134-1.
- Pepys, Samuel (2006). Guy de la Bedoyere (ed.). The letters of Samuel Pepys, 1656–1703. Woodbridge: Boydell. ISBN 1-84383-197-X.

=== The Diary (Definitive and Unexpurgated Edition) ===
- Volume I. Introduction and 1660. ISBN 0-7135-1551-1
- Volume II. 1661. ISBN 0-7135-1552-X
- Volume III. 1662. ISBN 0-7135-1553-8
- Volume IV. 1663. ISBN 0-7135-1554-6
- Volume V. 1664. ISBN 0-7135-1555-4
- Volume VI. 1665. ISBN 0-7135-1556-2
- Volume VII. 1666. ISBN 0-7135-1557-0
- Volume VIII. 1667. ISBN 0-7135-1558-9
- Volume IX. 1668–9. ISBN 0-7135-1559-7
- Pepys, Samuel (2004). C. S. Knighton (ed.). Pepys's later diaries. Stroud: Sutton. ISBN 0-7509-3656-8.
- Volume X. Companion. ISBN 0-7135-1993-2
- Volume XI. Index. ISBN 0-7135-1994-0

=== Cited secondary sources ===
- Bryant, Arthur (1933). Samuel Pepys (I: The man in the making. II: The years of peril. III: The saviour of the navy) (Revised 1948. Reprinted 1934, 1961, etc. ed.). Cambridge: University Press. LCC DA447.P4 B8.
- Bryson, Bill (2010). At Home. Canada: Anchor Random House. ISBN 978-0385661645.
- Cunningham, Peter (1908). Goodwin, Gordon (ed.). The Story of Nell Gwyn. Edinburgh: John Grant.
- Davies, J. D. (2017). Kings of the Sea: Charles II, James II and the Royal Navy. Barnsley: Seaforth Publishing. ISBN 978-1-84832-400-8.
- Foxen, David (1963). "Libertine Literature in England, 1660–1745". The Book Collector. 12 (1): 21–35. (spring)
- Hammerton, J.A. (1937). Outline of Great Books. New York: Wise & Co.
- Henning, Basil Duke (1983). The House of Commons, 1660–1690. Vol. III, Members M–Y. London: Secker & Warburg. ISBN 0-436-19274-8.
- Kuiper, Kathleen (2011). Prose: Literary Terms and Concepts. New York: Rosen Publishing. ISBN 978-1615304943.
- Lodge, Edmund (1861). The Peerage and Baronetage of the British Empire.
- Montague-Smith, Patrick W (1968). Debrett's peerage, baronetage, knightage and companionage: with Her Majesty's Royal warrant holders, 1968 ... Kelley's Directories. OCLC 8808676.
- Stigler, S. M. (2006). "Isaac Newton as Probabilist". Statistical Science. 21 (3): 400–403. arXiv:math/0701089. doi:10.1214/088342306000000312. S2CID 17471221.
- Ollard, Richard (1984) [1974]. Pepys: a biography. Oxford: Oxford University Press. ISBN 0-19-281466-4.
- Parker, Matthew (2011). The sugar barons : family, corruption, empire, and war in the West Indies. New York: Walker & Co. ISBN 9780802717443. OCLC 682894539.
- Tomalin, Claire (2002). Samuel Pepys: the unequalled self. London: Viking. ISBN 0-670-88568-1.
- Trease, Geoffrey (1972). Samuel Pepys and his world. Norwich, Great Britain: Jorrold and Son.
- Andrew Godsell "Samuel Pepys: A Man and His Diary" in "Legends of British History" 2008
- Knighton, C. S. (2004). "Pepys, Samuel (1633–1703)". Oxford Dictionary of National Biography (online ed.). Oxford University Press. (Subscription, Wikipedia Library access or UK public library membership required.)
- Weinreb, Ben; Hibbert, Christopher; Keay, John; Keay, Julia, eds. (2008) [1983]. The London Encyclopaedia (Third ed.). Macmillan. ISBN 978-1-405-04924-5.

=== Further reading ===
- Coote, Stephen (2000). Samuel Pepys: A Life. London: Hodder and Stoughton.
- Driver, C.; Berridale-Johnson, M. (1984). Pepys at Table. London: Bell & Hyman.
- Knighton, C. S. (2003). Pepys and the Navy. Stroud: Sutton Publishing.
- Long, James; Long, Ben (2007). The Plot Against Pepys. Woodstock, NY and New York: Overlook Press. ISBN 978-1-59020-069-8. A detailed account of the Popish Plot and Pepys's involvement in it, 1679–1680.
- Loveman, Kate. 2015. Samuel Pepys and His Books: Reading Newsgathering and Sociability 1660–1703. 1st ed., Oxford: Oxford University Press.
- Loveman, Kate (2022). "Women and the History of Samuel Pepys's Diary". The Historical Journal.
- Loveman, Kate (2025). ‘’The Strange History of Samuel Pepys's Diary.’’ Cambridge: Cambridge University Press
- Rodger, N. A. M. (2005). The Command of the Ocean: A Naval History of Britain, 1649–1815. New York: W.W. Norton. ISBN 978-0-393-06050-8.. Includes an extensive specialist annotated bibliography. UK edition published in London, 2004.

Parliament of England
Preceded by Sir Robert Paston; Sir John Trevor	Member of Parliament for Castle Rising; 1673–1679; With: Sir John Trevor	Succeeded by Sir Robert Howard; Sir John Trevor
Preceded by Sir Capel Luckyn; Thomas King	Member of Parliament for Harwich; 1679; With: Anthony Deane	Succeeded by Sir Thomas Middleton; Sir Philip Parker
Preceded by Sir Thomas Middleton; Sir Philip Parker	Member of Parliament for Harwich; 1685–1689; With: Anthony Deane	Succeeded by John Eldred; Sir Thomas Middleton
Professional and academic associations
Preceded by Cyril Wyche	6th President of the Royal Society; 1684–1686	Succeeded by John Vaughan
