= Thomas Gale (classical scholar) =

British antiquarian

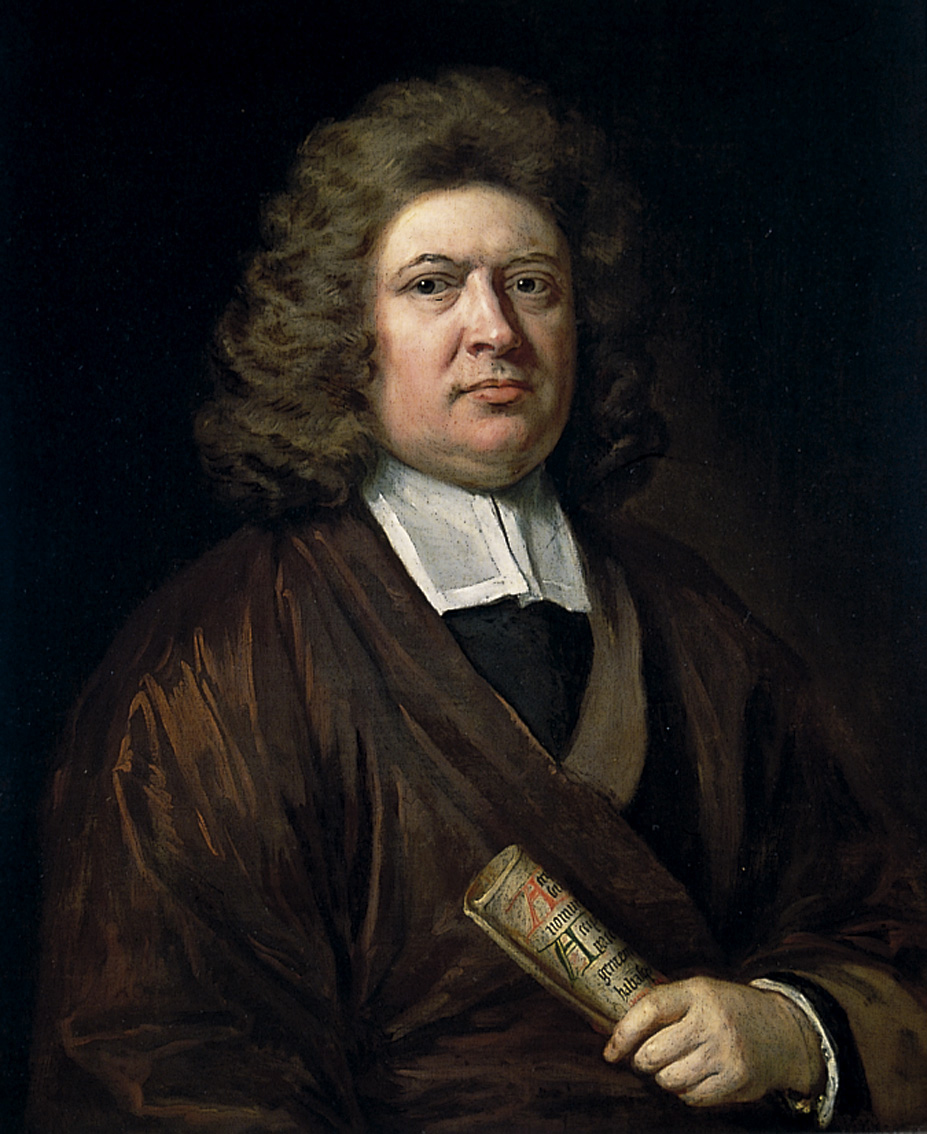
Thomas Gale in 1689

Thomas Gale (1635/1636? – 7 or 8 April 1702) was an English classical scholar, antiquarian and cleric.

== Life ==
Gale was born at Scruton, North Yorkshire. He was educated at Westminster School and Trinity College, Cambridge, of which he became a fellow.

In 1666 he was appointed Regius Professor of Greek at Cambridge, in 1672 high master of St Paul's School, in 1676 prebendary of St Paul's, in 1677 a fellow of the Royal Society, and in 1697 Dean of York. He died in York.

He married Barbara Pepys, daughter of Roger Pepys MP, of Impington and his second wife Barbara Bacon, and thus a cousin of Samuel Pepys, who under her nickname "Bab" refers to her several times in his famous diary. She died in 1689. He was the father of two noted antiquarians, Roger Gale and Samuel Gale, and father-in-law of the Rev. Dr. William Stukeley. To his collection of manuscripts belonged Minuscule 66.

== Works ==
He published a mythographical collection, Opuscula mythologica, ethica, et physica, and editions of several Greek and Latin authors, but his fame rests chiefly on his collection of old works bearing on early English history, entitled Historiae Anglicanae scriptores and Historiae Britannicae, Saxonicae, Anglo-Danicae scriptores XV. He was the author of the inscription on the London Monument, later removed, in which the Roman Catholics were accused of having originated the Great Fire of London.

== Books ==
- (ed.): Opuscula mythologica physica et ethica. Graece et latine. Seriem eorum sistit pagina praefationem proxime sequens (Amsterdam: H. Wetstein 1671, auch 1688)
- (ed.): Historiae poeticae Scriptores antiqui (Paris: Muguet-Scott 1675)
- (ed.): Iamblichi Liber de mysteriis Aegyptiorum (1678)
- (ed.): Ψαλτηριον. Psalterium. Juxta exemplar Alexandrinum editio nova, Græce & Latine (Oxford: Sheldon 1678)
- (ed.): Rerum Anglicarum Scriptorum Veterum Tom. ... (Oxford: Sheldon 1684)
- (ed.): Historiae Anglicanae Scriptores Quinque (Oxford: Sheldon, 1687) (Rerum Anglicarum scriptores veteres, 2)
- (ed.): Historiae Britannicae, Saxonicae, Anglo-Danicae Scriptores XV (Oxford: Sheldon, 1691) (Rerum Anglicarum scriptores veteres, 3)
- (ed.): Antonini Iter Britanniarum

== See also ==
- De divisione naturae

== Sources ==
Academic offices
Preceded by James Valentine	Regius Professor of Greek Cambridge University; 1666–1672	Succeeded by John North
