= Thomas Greeting =

English musician

Thomas Greeting (fl. 1675) was an English musician.

Greeting published in 1675 The Pleasant Companion, or new Lessons and Instructions for the Flagelet. Pepys engaged him to teach his wife an 'art that would be easy and pleasant for her' (1 March 1666 – 1667); in the following year Greeting sent the Duke of Buckingham's musicians to Pepys's house to play dance music.
