= Roger Pepys =

English lawyer and politician

Roger Pepys (3 May 1617 – 4 October 1688) was an English lawyer and politician who sat in the House of Commons from 1661 to 1678. He is chiefly remembered as Samuel Pepys's "Cousin Roger". He and his children appear regularly in Samuel's great Diary. Relations between the two men were always good.

== Early life ==
Pepys was born at Heydon, Norfolk, the son of Talbot Pepys of Impington, Cambridgeshire and his wife Beatrice Castell, daughter of John Castell of Raveningham, Norfolk. He was educated at The Perse School, Cambridge under the headmastership of Abel Lovering (later the much-loved headmaster of Norwich School) and was admitted at Christ's College, Cambridge on 17 April 1635.

== Career ==
He was admitted at the Middle Temple on 4 November 1634 and was called to the bar in 1641. His cousin Samuel Pepys considered him to be too simple to be a useful lawyer, although his integrity was never in doubt. In the bitter and long drawn out inheritance dispute over the Brampton estate in Huntingdonshire, which Samuel inherited from his uncle Robert, Roger himself regretted that the ultimate settlement was far from favourable to Samuel, his client, although they agreed that it was better to settle the case then let it drag on. He became recorder of Cambridge in 1660 when his father gave up that position.

In 1661, Pepys was elected Member of Parliament for Cambridge in the Cavalier Parliament and sat until 1678. He was active in various bills in his early years in the house, particularly the plague bill in 1665. Though not a republican, he was something of a Puritan, and his cousin Samuel in his Diary records his low opinion of the "young bloods" who dominated the Cavalier Parliament. He was also critical of the Anglican bishops, especially Gilbert Sheldon. His criticisms of the Court became more and more vocal as the years passed: at the Cambridge Assizes in 1664 he was bound over by Sir John Kelyng for insulting the Lord Chief Justice, Sir Robert Hyde. However, he was never associated with any opposition movement: like all the "country gentlemen" he prided himself on being independent of any party or faction.

He objected to the precedence given to the vice-chancellor of Cambridge University over the mayor, and acted as teller for an amendment. He was chairman in regard to the bills for establishing the London Fire Court and against atheism and profanity. He stood at the general election in 1679 but was defeated. His cousin Samuel acknowledged that, whatever their differences, Roger had always loyally defended him from attacks on him in Parliament.

He became a bencher of his Inn in 1664. In 1679 he was removed from his post as recorder "for acting in conjunction with the factious party against the court and loyal interest".

Pepys died at the age of 71 and was buried at Impington.

== Family ==
Pepys married four times. He married firstly Anne Banks, daughter of Luke Banks of Beck Hall, Giggleswick, North Yorkshire. He married secondly Barbara Bacon, daughter of Francis Bacon of Norwich and had four sons and two daughters. Through his third wife Parnele Duke, daughter of John Duke, of Worlingham, Suffolk, he inherited the Manor of Diss, Norfolk. He married fourthly Esther Conyers, widow of Rev. Richard Conyers and daughter of Bernard Dickenson of Westminster. His cousin Samuel liked Esther greatly for her cheerfulness and good nature: "an understanding and good woman".

His younger son John was later MP for Cambridge. His eldest son Talbot (died 1681), a barrister, and his daughters Bab and Betty were referred to in the diary of his cousin Samuel, as was their stepmother Esther. Bab married Thomas Gale, high master of St. Paul's School, London and Dean of York, and Betty married Charles Long, Vicar of Risby. Samuel Pepys was fond of both Bab and Betty, although he grumbled at the cost of entertaining them during their visit to his London house in February 1669.

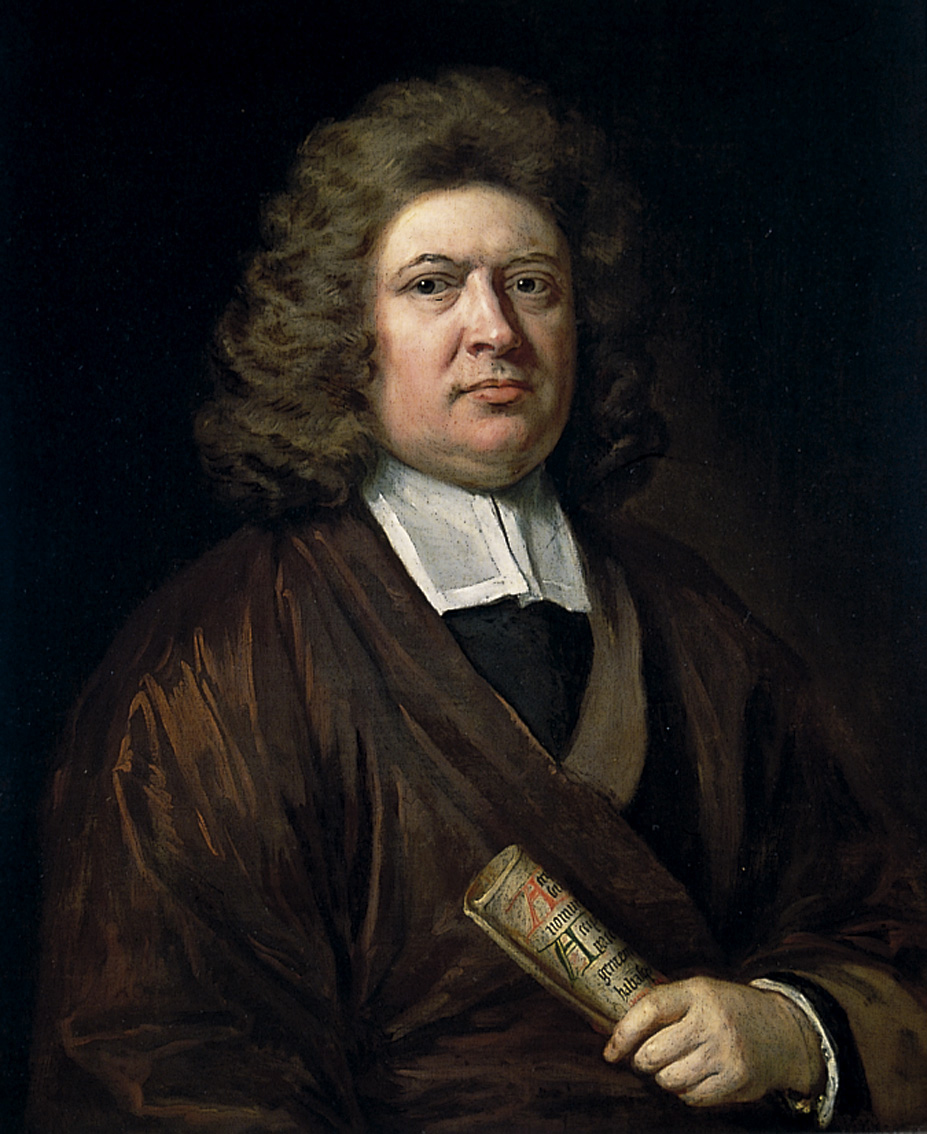
Thomas Gale, who married Roger's daughter Bab

Parliament of England
| Preceded by Sir Dudley North; Sir Thomas Wills, Bt | Member of Parliament for Cambridge; 1661–1678; With: Sir William Compton 1661–1664; The Lord Alington 1664–1678 | Succeeded by The Lord Alington; Sir Thomas Chicheley |
