= John Eldred (MP) =

English Member of Parliament

John Eldred (1629-1717), of Earl's Colne, Essex, was an English Member of Parliament (MP).

He was a Member of the Parliament of England for Harwich in 1689, in the Convention Parliament.

Parliament of England
| Preceded by Anthony Dean; Samuel Pepys | Member of Parliament for Harwich; 1689; With: Thomas Middleton | Succeeded by Thomas Middleton; Viscount Newhaven |
