= Edmund Sawyer (MP) =

English Member of Parliament

Edmund Sawyer (c.1586/7–1676), of London and Heywood, White Waltham, Berkshire, was an English Member of Parliament (MP).

He was a Member of the Parliament of England for New Windsor in 1624, for Harwich in 1625 and for Berwick-upon-Tweed 1628.

Parliament of England
| Preceded by Charles Howard; Sir Robert Bennet | Member of Parliament for New Windsor; 1624; With: Thomas Woodward | Succeeded by William Russell; Humphrey Newbury |
| Preceded by Nathaniel Rich; Christopher Herrys | Member of Parliament for Harwich; 1625; With: Christopher Herrys | Succeeded by Nathaniel Rich; Christopher Herrys |
| Preceded by Robert Jackson; Richard Lowther | Member of Parliament for Berwick-upon-Tweed; 1628; With: Edward Liveley | Succeeded by Thomas Widdrington; Hugh Potter |
