= Edward Grimston (Harwich MP) =

Edward Grimston (21 August 1600 – 1624), of Bradfield Hall, Essex, was an English Member of Parliament (MP).

Grimston was the eldest son of Sir Harbottle Grimston, 1st Baronet. His great-uncle was the Ipswich MP, Edward Grimston. Grimston was educated at Clare College, Cambridge University in 1616 and Emmanuel College, Cambridge in 1617, with a BA 1618/19. He went to Gray's Inn in 1619. He married Magdalen née Marsham, a daughter of Thomas Marsham of Milk Street, London, and had one son and one daughter. He was buried 28 April 1624.

He was a Member of the Parliament of England for Harwich in 1621.

Parliament of England
Preceded by Sir Harbottle Grimston, 1st Baronet; Charles Montagu (of Boughton)	Member of Parliament for Harwich; 1621; With: Thomas Cheek	Succeeded by Nathaniel Rich; Christopher Herrys
