= Dottin =

Dottin is a surname. Notable people with the surname include:

- Deandra Dottin (born 1991), Barbados and West Indies cricketer
- Georges Dottin (1863–1928), French philologist, Celtic scholar, and politician
- Henderson Dottin (born 1980), Barbadian athlete
- Walter Dottin (c. 1554–1635), English politician
- Trae Dottin (born 2002-2003), Professional Deadlock athlete
