= Edward Aylmer Digby =

British naval officer

Edward Aylmer Digby KC (3 October 1883 – 14 November 1935) was a British Naval Officer, Kings Council and politician.

His father was Sir Kenelm Edward Digby

A gunnery specialist plagued by terrible eyesight and "neurasthenia", Digby served in the Royal Navy until 1919 when he was finally invalided and placed on the retired list for his infirmities at the rank of Commander. Although he stood as a Liberal parliamentary candidate at the 1918 general election, he later joined the Labour Party and stood as a Labour parliamentary candidate in 1931.

== Electoral record ==
General Election 1918: Harwich
Party		Candidate	Votes	%	±%
C	Unionist	Harry Newton	8,261	53.9	−2.5
	Liberal	Edward Aylmer Digby	7,064	46.1	+2.5
Majority			1,197	7.8	−5.0
Turnout			15,325	55.9	−26.5
Registered electors			27,421		
	Unionist hold		Swing	-2.5	
C indicates candidate endorsed by the coalition government.

General Election 1931: Colchester
Party	Candidate	Votes	%	±%
Conservative	Oswald Lewis	22,285	67.5	+27.2
Labour	Edward Aylmer Digby	10,725	32.5	−6.0
Majority		11,560	35.0	+34.0
Turnout			76.4	−3.0
Conservative hold		Swing	+16.6	
