= Christopher Tower =

Christopher Tower may refer to:

- Christopher Tower (MP, died 1771) (c. 1694–1771), MP for Lancaster, Aylesbury and Bossinney
- Christopher Thomas Tower (1775–1867), grandson of the preceding, MP for Harwich
- Christopher Tower (MP, died 1884) (1804–1884), son of the preceding, MP for Buckinghamshire
