= Nathaniel Rich (merchant adventurer) =

English merchant adventurer and politician (1585–1636)

Sir Nathaniel Rich (1585–1636) was an English merchant adventurer and politician who sat in the House of Commons at various times between 1614 and 1629.

== Early life ==
Nathaniel Rich was born to Jane Machell and Richard Rich of Leez Priory, Essex. His father was an illegitimate son of Richard Rich, 1st Baron Rich. In 1598 Nathaniel and his sister Margaret, later Dame Margaret Wroth, were with their mother at their father's deathbed at Leez, attended by William Noyes, then 'minister of this place'. Nathaniel matriculated pensioner from Emmanuel College, Cambridge and graduated B.A. in 1604/05. He had a legal training, and was admitted a member of Gray's Inn on 2 February 1609/10, as of Ash, Essex.

== Political career ==
In 1614 he was elected Member of Parliament for Totnes. He was knighted at Hatton House on 8 November 1617. He was a board member of the Somers Isles Company, and in 1619 bought shares in the Virginia Company. In November 1620, he was listed as one of the shareholders of the Plymouth Council for New England, a group that would open up colonization of New England. In 1621 he was elected MP for East Retford and sat on a royal commission in Ireland in 1622.

Rich became a prominent member of the Virginia Company, and when, in April 1623, there occurred the great split between two factions in the company, he took a leading part on the side of his cousin, Robert Rich, 2nd Earl of Warwick. In 1624 he was elected MP for East Retford and for Harwich and chose to sit for Harwich. He was specially attacked by the opposing faction of the Virginia Company when the dispute came before the House of Commons in May 1624, but he sat on the Virginia commission of July 1624.

Rich was re-elected MP for Harwich in 1626 and 1628 and sat until 1629 when King Charles decided to rule without parliament for eleven years. In 1629, with the Earl of Warwick and others, he found the funds for the first voyage of discovery to Providence Island, off the north-east of Yucatan. On 4 December 1630 they received the patent forming the governor and company of adventurers for the plantation of Providence and Henrietta. To this Providence Island Company Rich seems henceforth to have devoted his best efforts. Many matters of importance, especially regulations and affairs requiring legal handling, were left to him. When fresh funds were required he was always the first to respond. He appears to have pursued a forward policy, for in 1635 he advocated the admission of all the adventurers to the benefits of the trade of the main. A little later, on his motion, the first local council of Providence was appointed. On 7 May 1635 he was appointed deputy governor of the company, and held the post for about a year.

== Death ==
Rich died before 26 May 1636. It was rumoured to Mathew Cradock that overdoses from an antimonial cup from Massachusetts hastened his end. In his will he named several of the Rich (Warwick) family. He also left money and lands in the Bermudas to maintain schools there. He desired to be buried at Stondon Massey, Essex, the manor of which he purchased in around 1610. He left the manor to his nephew Nathaniel Rich, son of his brother Robert Rich who had pre-deceased him.

Parliament of England
Preceded by Christopher Brocking; Walter Dottyn	Member of Parliament for Totnes; 1614; With: Lawrence Adams	Succeeded by Sir Edward Giles; Richard Rodd
Preceded by Sir William Cavendish; Sir Walter Chute	Member of Parliament for East Retford; 1621–1624; With: Edward Wortley 1621–1622; John Holles 1624	Succeeded by Sir Francis Wortley; John Holles
Preceded by Sir Thomas Cheek; Edward Grimston	Member of Parliament for Harwich; 1624; With: Christopher Herrys	Succeeded by Christopher Herrys; Sir Edmund Sawyer
Preceded by Christopher Herrys; Sir Edmund Sawyer	Member of Parliament for Harwich; 1626–1629; With: Christopher Herrys	Parliament suspended until 1640
