= Charles Montagu (of Boughton) =

English politician

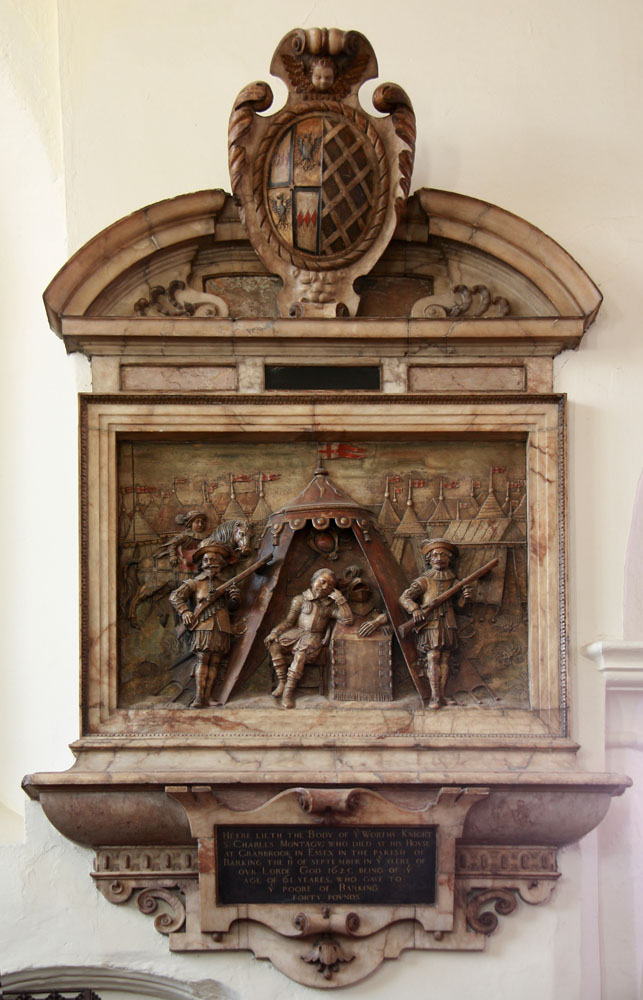
Mural monument to Sir Charles Montagu St Margaret's Church, Barking, Essex. His quartered arms at top impale Vert fretty or (Whitmore, for his wife)

Arms of Sir Charles Montagu, as seen on his monument, Montagu of Boughton (Montagu, Earl of Salisbury, differenced by a bordure sable) quartering Monthermer

Sir Charles Montagu (c. 1564 – 11 September 1625) of Cranbrook Hall in the parish of Barking, Essex, was an English politician who sat in the House of Commons from 1614 to 1625.

Montagu was one of the eight sons of Sir Edward Montagu of Boughton House in Northamptonshire by his wife Elizabeth Harington, a daughter of James Harington of Exton, Rutland and Lucy Sidney. Among his brothers were Edward Montagu, 1st Baron Montagu of Boughton, ancestor of Montagu, Dukes of Montagu; Henry Montagu, 1st Earl of Manchester, ancestor of Montagu, Dukes of Manchester and Montagu, Earls of Halifax and Sir Sidney Montagu, ancestor of Montagu, Earls of Sandwich. He was knighted at York or at Grimston Park on 18 April 1603.

He was elected as a Member of Parliament for Harwich in 1614, after Sir Robert Mansell was elected for two constituencies, and chose to sit for another. Montagu sat until 1620.

In 1621, he was elected as an MP for Higham Ferrers. He was re-elected MP for Higham Ferrers in 1624 and 1625.

Montagu died at the age of 61 and was buried in St Margaret's Church, Barking where survives his mural monument depicting a small effigy of Sir Charles fully armed, sitting in a military tent during a campaign. Inscribed as follows:

Heere lieth the body of ye worthy knight S^{r} Charles Montagu who died at his house at Cranbrook in Essex in the parish of Barking the 11th of September in ye yeere of our Lorde God 1625 being of ye age of 61 yeares who gave to ye poore of Barking forty pounds

== Marriage and issue ==
Montagu married first Lettice, daughter of Henry Clifford of Keystone, Hunts, and secondly, he married Mary Whitmore, a daughter of William Whitmore Esq. (d.1593), Haberdasher, an Alderman of London, often erroneously stated to have been Sir William Whitmore, by whom he had three daughters and co-heiresses, including:

- Elizabeth Montagu (d. 1672), eldest daughter, who married Christopher Hatton, 1st Baron Hatton;
- the wife of Sir Edward Bysshe;
- Anne Montagu, who married Dudley North, 4th Baron North.

Parliament of England
Preceded by Sir Harbottle Grimston; Sir Robert Mansell	Member of Parliament for Harwich; 1614–1620; With: Sir Harbottle Grimston	Succeeded by Sir Thomas Cheek; Edward Grimston
Preceded by Rowland St John	Member of Parliament for Higham Ferrers; 1621–1625	Succeeded by Sir Thomas Dacres
