= Dennis Lydell =

Former English MP

Dennis Lydell (c. 1657 – 1717), of Wakehurst Place, Sussex, and Crutched Friars, London, was an English Member of Parliament (MP).

He was a Member of the Parliament of England for Harwich from February 1701 to 1702.

Parliament of England
| Preceded by Thomas Middleton; Thomas Davall | Member of Parliament for Harwich; 1701-1702; With: Thomas Davall | Succeeded by John Ellis; Thomas Davall |
