= Samuel Atkinson =

Samuel Atkinson may refer to:

- Samuel Atkinson (MP) (c. 1645 – 1718), UK member of parliament for Harwich from 1698 to 1699
- Samuel C. Atkinson (1864–1942), justice of the Supreme Court of Georgia from 1906 until his death
