= Anthony Deane (shipwright) =

English shipwright and politician (1633–1721)

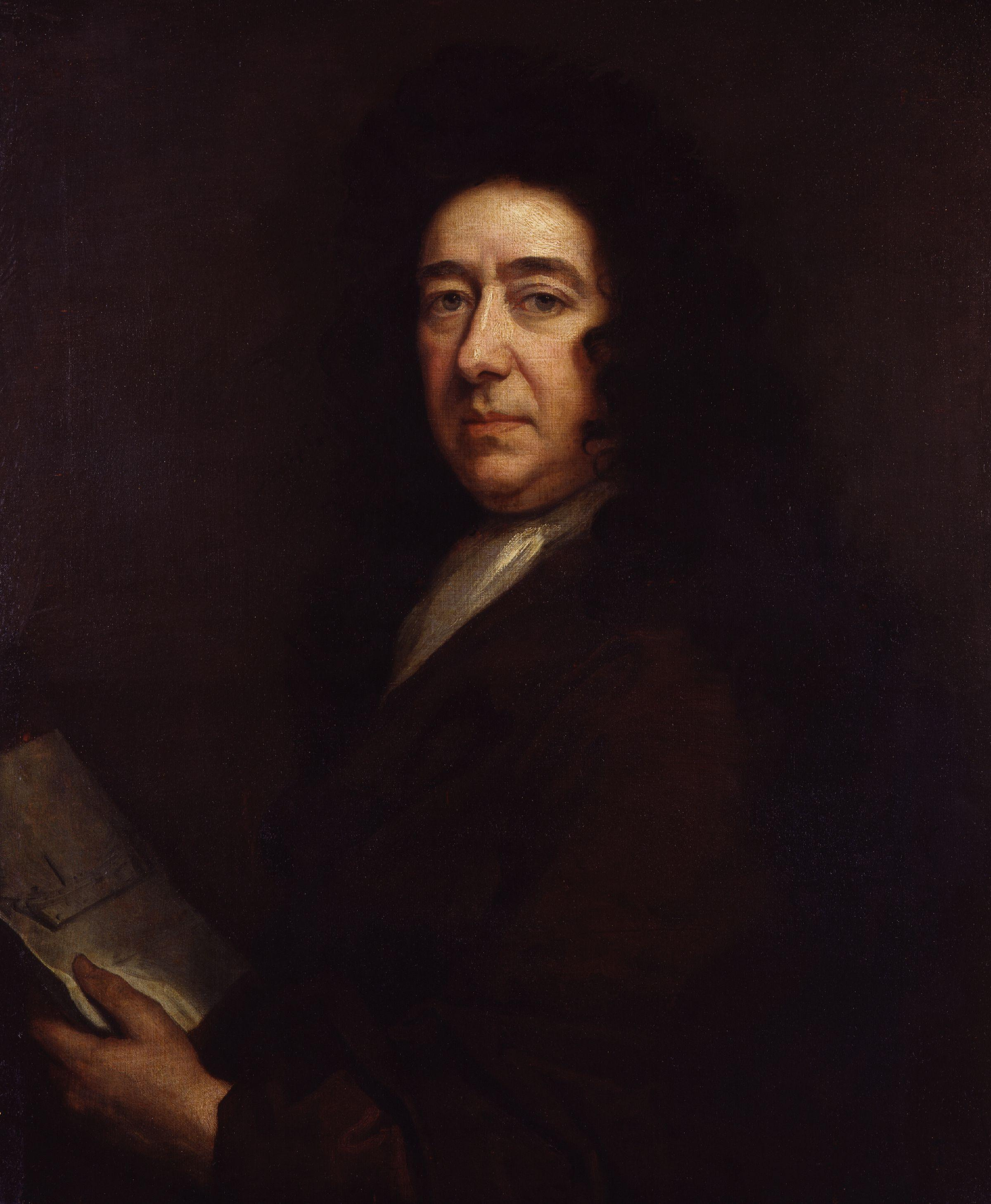
A 1690 portrait of Deane by Godfrey Kneller

Sir Anthony Deane, FRS (1633 – 1721) was an English shipwright and politician who sat in the English House of Commons and served as mayor of Harwich.

== Early life ==
Deane was baptised at Stow-on-the-Wold, Gloucestershire, on 3 December 1633. He is described in his Grant of Arms in 1683, as "son of Anthony, of London, gent., deceased, son of Anthony, of county Gloucester". At an early age he was apprenticed to master shipwright Christopher Pett at Woolwich Dockyard, and was appointed as the Dockyard's assistant shipwright in 1660.

== Naval career ==
[Deane is] "a very able man, and able to do the King's service ... [I] will commend his work with skill and vie with others, especially the Petts"

— Samuel Pepys' Diary, 18 August 1662

In August 1662 Deane met Samuel Pepys, the Clerk of the Acts and member of the Navy Board. Pepys was impressed with Deane's ability and saw in him a potential rival for Christopher Pett, against whom Pepys held a political grudge. On Pepys' recommendation, the Navy Board reopened the derelict Harwich Dockyard in October 1664 and appointed Deane as its master shipwright, elevating him from being Pett's assistant to his nominal equal. For Deane, the promotion meant that he would have a free hand in designing and constructing naval vessels, albeit at a smaller dockyard than the great Navy establishments of Portsmouth, Plymouth or Deptford.

Deane was one of the earliest to apply scientific principles to the building of naval vessels, and between 1666 and 1675 he designed and built 25 vessels for the Royal Navy, including Rupert, Francis, Roebuck, Resolution, Swiftsure, and Harwich.

One of the first indications of the application to scientific principles to ship construction is found in Pepys' diary, which records that in 1666 "Mr. Deane . . . then fell to explain to me the manner of casting the draught of water which a ship will draw, beforehand, which is a secret the King and all admire in him; and he is the first that hath come to any certainty beforehand of foretelling the draught of water of a ship, before she is launched."
The method used by Mr. (afterwards Sir Anthony) Deane of calculating the displacement of ships is unknown; but it appears that about 1700 this was effected by dividing the body by equidistant sections, calculating the area of each and thence obtaining the displacement by some rough process of quadrature. There is, however, no record of such calculations, and it was probable they were but rarely performed.

Harwich Dockyard was closed in 1668, following the end of the Second Anglo-Dutch War, and Deane was appointed Master Shipwright at Portsmouth Dockyard. In 1670 he became the first English shipwright to use iron as a substantial construction component in a Royal Navy vessel, with U-shaped iron bars to secure the planking of HMS Royal James relative to the internal beams within her hull. His patron Pepys strongly disapproved of this innovation and the matter was ultimately referred to the King, Charles II, who endorsed Deane's actions. However, the innovation was not repeated in other Royal Navy vessels until the adoption of the 1719 Establishment nearly fifty years later.

In 1672 Deane was promoted to become Commissioner at Portsmouth, thus becoming a member of the Navy Board. No longer responsible for shipbuilding at Portsmouth, he still was able to build several ships as a private contractor, mainly at Harwich but also at Rotherhithe.

== Politics ==
In 1675 he was knighted and appointed Controller of the Victualling Accounts. In the previous year, as an alderman of Harwich, he funded the construction of a new jail and guildhall in the town. He was also an alderman of the City of London. He became Mayor of Harwich for 1676, and he and his patron Samuel Pepys were the MPs for Harwich in Charles II's third parliament (which sat from 6 March 1678 and formed part of the Cavalier Parliament). They were returned for the 1679 Parliament despite both being accused of leaking naval intelligence to France, and being on 9 July 1679 brought before the King's Bench at Westminster on a charge of treason and imprisoned in the Tower of London, but bailed to appear for trial at a later date. The charges were not pressed, and on 14 February 1680, the pair were released from their bail. For the next few years, Deane continued his successful career as a private shipbuilder.

He and Pepys were also MPs for Harwich in James II's first parliament from 19 May 1685.

His written work includes a Doctrine for Naval Architecture, published in 1670, now seen as one of the most important texts in the history of naval architecture. He was also a mentor of Peter the Great during his Grand Embassy.

He married twice; firstly to Ann Prowse, a widow who bore him four sons and a daughter and secondly to Jane Christian Dawes, the widow of Sir John Dawes, and the mother of William Dawes, Archbishop of York, who bore him three sons and five daughters.

Parliament of England
Preceded by Sir Capel Luckyn; Thomas King	Member of Parliament for Harwich; 1679; With: Samuel Pepys	Succeeded by Sir Thomas Middleton; Sir Philip Parker, Bt
Preceded by Sir Thomas Middleton; Sir Philip Parker, Bt	Member of Parliament for Harwich; 1685–1689; With: Samuel Pepys	Succeeded by John Eldred; Sir Thomas Middleton
