= John Charles Herries =

British politician and financier (1778–1855)

The Right Honourable John Charles Herries
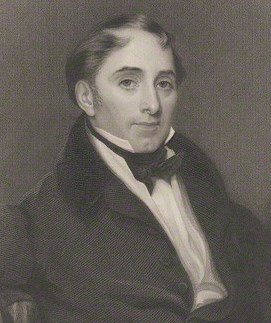

Chancellor of the Exchequer
- In office 3 September 1827 – 25 January 1828
- Monarch: George IV
- Prime Minister: The Viscount Goderich
- Preceded by: The Lord Tenterden (interim)
- Succeeded by: Henry Goulburn

President of the Board of Trade
- In office 2 February – 22 November 1830
- Monarchs: George IV; William IV
- Prime Minister: The Duke of Wellington
- Preceded by: William Vesey-FitzGerald
- Succeeded by: The Lord Auckland

Member of Parliament for Harwich
- In office 1823–1847
- Preceded by: Charles Bathurst; Nicholas Vansittart
- Succeeded by: William Beresford; John Attwood

Member of Parliament for Stamford
- In office 1847–1853
- Preceded by: Sir George Clerk, Bt
- Succeeded by: Viscount Cranborne

Personal details
- Born: November 1778
- Died: 24 April 1855 (aged 76) St Julians, Kent
- Party: Tory
- Spouse: Sarah Dorington (d. 1821)
- Education: University of Leipzig

John Charles Herries PC (November 1778 – 24 April 1855), known as J. C. Herries, was a British politician and financier and a frequent member of Tory and Conservative cabinets in the early to mid-19th century.

== Background and education ==
Herries was the eldest son of Charles Herries, a London merchant, by his wife Mary Ann Johnson, and was educated at Cheam and the University of Leipzig.

== Political career ==
Herries worked his way up in the Treasury and eventually became Secretary to the First Lord of the Treasury, Commissary-General to the Army, Paymaster of the Civil List, Secretary to the Treasury (1823–1827), Chancellor of the Exchequer in Lord Goderich's government (1827–1828), Master of the Mint under the Duke of Wellington (1828–1830), briefly President of the Board of Trade (1830), Secretary at War under Sir Robert Peel (1834–1835), and finally President of the Board of Control in Lord Derby's first government (1852). During his tenure as Commissary-General, he used the help of Nathan Mayer Rothschild to transfer money to British and allied army troops on the continent, which was not an easy task during the Continental Blockade. Rothschild's successful conclusion of these transfers was one of the foundations of the house's English banking empire.

Herries was one of few men of ministerial experience to side with the protectionist Tories after the repeal of the Corn Laws. Following the death of Lord George Bentinck in 1848, Herries was suggested by Lord Stanley as an alternative to Benjamin Disraeli as Shadow Leader of the House of Commons. In the end Herries declined, and Disraeli gradually came into his own as leader. Staunchly protectionist, Herries was in repeated conflict with Disraeli who, despite championing protectionism barely six years before, was hurriedly disassociating himself and the party from that doctrine. The two never got along, and Herries' refusal to assist in the framing of the 1852 Budget (which he regarded as "wild work"), cannot have helped matters. By the time of Derby's second government in 1858, Herries had died. His son, Charles Herries, was appointed Chairman of the Board of Inland Revenue by Disraeli during the latter's second premiership in 1877.

== Family ==
Herries married Sarah, daughter of John Dorington, in 1814. They had three sons, one of whom, Sir Charles Herries, was a well-known financier. Sarah died in February 1821. Herries survived her by over thirty years and died at St Julians, near Sevenoaks, Kent, in April 1855, aged 76.

Parliament of the United Kingdom
| Preceded by Charles Bathurst; Nicholas Vansittart | Member of Parliament for Harwich; 1823–1841; With: George Canning 1823–1826; Nicholas Conyngham Tindal 1826–1827; Sir William Rae, Bt 1827–1830; George Robert Dawson 1830–1832; Christopher Thomas Tower 1832–1835; Francis Robert Bonham 1835–1837; Alexander Ellice 1837–1841 | Succeeded by William Beresford; John Attwood |
| Preceded by Sir George Clerk, Bt; Marquess of Granby | Member of Parliament for Stamford; 1847–1853; With: Marquess of Granby 1847–1852; Sir Frederic Thesiger 1852–1853 | Succeeded by Viscount Cranborne; Sir Frederic Thesiger |
Political offices
| Preceded by Charles Arbuthnot; Stephen Rumbold Lushington | Joint Secretary to the Treasury; 1823–1827; With: Stephen Rumbold Lushington 1823–1827; Joseph Planta 1827 | Succeeded by Joseph Planta; Thomas Frankland Lewis |
| Preceded by George Canning | Chancellor of the Exchequer; 1827–1828 | Succeeded by Henry Goulburn |
| Preceded by George Tierney | Master of the Mint; 1828–1830 | Succeeded by The Lord Auckland |
| Preceded by William Vesey-FitzGerald | President of the Board of Trade; 1830 | Succeeded by The Lord Auckland |
| Preceded by Edward Ellice | Secretary at War; 1834–1835 | Succeeded by Viscount Howick |
| Preceded by Marquess of Granby | Conservative Leader of the Commons; 1849–1851; With: Benjamin Disraeli and Marquess of Granby | Succeeded by Benjamin Disraeli |
| Preceded by Fox Maule | President of the Board of Control; 1852 | Succeeded by Sir Charles Wood |
