= Francis Robert Bonham =

British party agent and politician

Francis Robert Bonham (6 September 1785 – 26 April 1863) was a British party agent and politician.

== Early life ==
He was the only surviving son (another two died in infancy) of Francis Warren Bonham, a landowner from Kildare who had moved to London with his wife Dorothea. After home schooling Bonham was accepted into Corpus Christi College, Oxford where he finished his BA in 1807, joining Lincoln's Inn in 1808 and being called to the bar (although he never practised law) in 1814.

== Political career ==
In August 1830 he was elected a Member of Parliament for Rye and served as assistant Tory Party whip until 1831, when he was defeated in the general election. After his defeat he continued to work in Rye as a party agent for the 1832 election, and until 1837 acted as the Tory Party's chief electoral expert (replacing William Holmes). He served as Storekeeper of the Ordnance in Robert Peel's first government from 1834 and in 1835 was again returned to parliament, this time for Harwich where he served until 1837 and again also served as assistant whip.

== Later life ==
Despite being out of parliament in 1841 Peel again appointed him Storekeeper of the Ordnance, a position he resigned in 1845 after a scandal involving improperly-bought railway shares. He remained as an unpaid volunteer until 1853, when he was appointed as a Commissioner for Income Tax to prevent him from becoming bankrupt.

He died on 26 April 1863 at home, with many of his papers having been collected by Peel and destroyed apart from a few texts now in the Peel papers of the British Library.

Political offices
Preceded by Henry Duncan	Storekeeper of the Ordnance; 1834–1835	Succeeded by George Anson
Preceded by James Hanway Plumridge	Storekeeper of the Ordnance; 1841–1845	Succeeded by Thomas Hastings
Parliament of Great Britain
Preceded by De Lacy Evans; Richard Arkwright	Member of Parliament for Rye; 1830–1831; With: Hugh Duncan Baillie	Succeeded by De Lacy Evans; Thomas Pemberton
Preceded by Christopher Thomas Tower; John Charles Herries	Member of Parliament for Harwich; 1835–1837; With: John Charles Herries	Succeeded by Alexander Ellice; John Charles Herries
