= Sir Philip Parker, 1st Baronet =

English politician

Sir Philip Parker, 1st Baronet (c. 1625 – March 1690), was an English politician who sat in the House of Commons between 1679 and 1687.

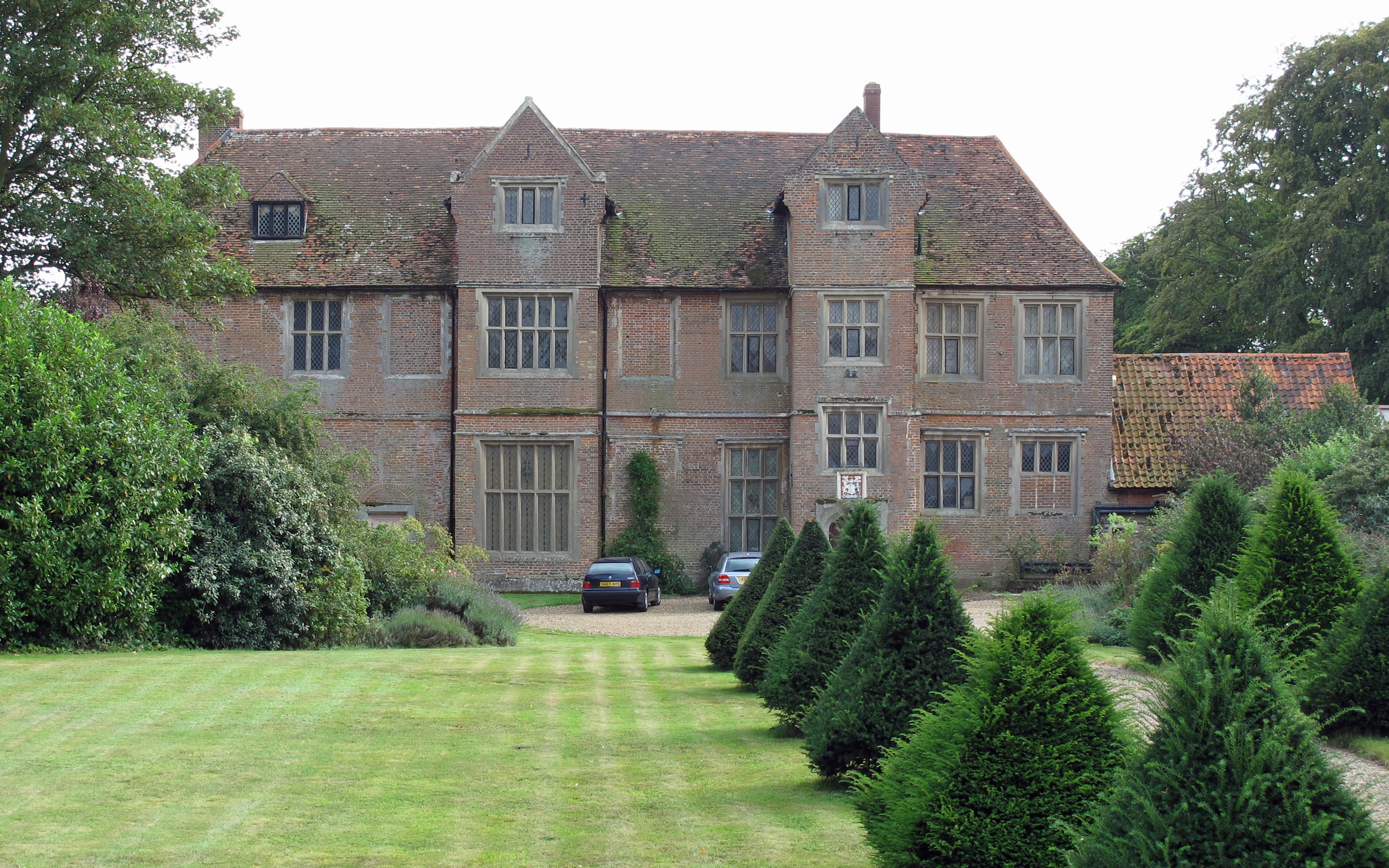
Erwarton Hall

Parker was the son of Sir Philip Parker of Erwarton Hall and his wife Dorothy Gawdy, daughter of Sir Robert Gawdy of Claxton, Norfolk.

Parker was created a Baronet of Arwarton in the County of Suffolk, on 16 July 1661. He was Member of Parliament for Harwich from 1679 to 1685. and for Sandwich from 1685 to 1687.

He commanded the White Regiment of Suffolk Militia at the Battle of Landguard Fort on 2 July 1667.

Parker married Rebecca Long, daughter of Sir Walter Long, 1st Baronet, on 9 April 1649. They had three sons and four daughters. these included

- Sir Philip Parker, 2nd Baronet (c. 1650–c. 1698), who succeeded him in 1690
- Calthorpe Parker (1657–1729) who added Long to his surname as a condition of inheriting the estates of his uncle Sir Walter Long.

He married secondly Hannah Bedingfield, widow of Sir Thomas Bedingfield and daughter of Philip Bacon of Wolverstone.

Parliament of England
Preceded by Sir Anthony Deane; Samuel Pepys	Member of Parliament for Harwich; 1679–1685; With: Sir Thomas Middleton	Succeeded by Sir Anthony Deane; Samuel Pepys
Preceded by John Thurbarne; James Oxenden	Member of Parliament for Sandwich; 1685–1689; With: John Strode	Succeeded by Sir James Oxenden, Bt; John Thurbarne
Baronetage of England
New title	Baronet (of Arwarton); 1661–1690	Succeeded by Philip Parker
