= Samuel Atkinson (MP) =

Samuel Atkinson (c. 1645 – 1718), of Rotherhithe, Surrey, was an English Member of Parliament (MP).

He was a Member of the Parliament of England for Harwich from 1698 to 14 February 1699.

Parliament of England
Preceded by Thomas Middleton; Viscount Newhaven	Member of Parliament for Harwich; 1698–1699; With: Thomas Davall	Succeeded by Thomas Middleton; Thomas Davall
