= Lydell =

Lydell is a surname and given name. Notable people with the surname include:

== Surname ==
- Dennis Lydell (c. 1657–1717), English politician

== Given name ==
- Lydell Carr (born 1965), American football player
- Lydell Mitchell (born 1949), American football player
- Lydell Ross (born 1983), American football player
- Lydell Sargeant (born 1987), American football player
