= Thomas Cheek =

English politician

Sir Thomas Cheek, Cheeke or Cheke (died March 1659) was an English politician who sat in the House of Commons in every parliament between 1614 and 1653.

== Life ==
Cheek was the son of Henry Cheke and his wife Frances Radclyffe (daughter of Sir Humphrey Radclyffe of Elstow and sister of Edward Radclyffe, 6th Earl of Sussex), and grandson of Sir John Cheke, royal preceptor and classical scholar. He was educated at St Peter's School, York where his school fellows included Thomas Morton, afterwards Bishop of Durham, and Guy Fawkes. He lost his father while a minor: he wrote a Greek letter and Latin verses to the Lord Treasurer in 1586 in which he called himself an orphan, and spoke of his father being gone to the joys of heaven. In it, he prays to his Lordship, that as he was always a help and a sanctuary unto his father, so he would be to him. Cheek was knighted by King James I on 11 May 1603.

In 1614, Cheek was elected Member of Parliament for Newport, and MP for Harwich Harwich in 1621. In 1624 he was elected MP for both Bere Alston and Essex, and chose to sit for Essex. He was MP for Bere Alston again in 1625 and was elected MP for Maldon in 1626. In 1628 he was elected MP for Colchester where he sat until 1629 when King Charles decided to rule without parliament for eleven years. He was awarded MA from Cambridge University in 1629.

Cheek was elected MP for Harwich in April 1640 for the Short Parliament and was re-elected for Harwich again in the Long Parliament in November 1640. He survived at least until Pride's Purge.

Cheek purchased Pirgo Park in Havering, Essex from the Grey family. He died at "a great age", and was buried on 25 March 1659 in St Alban, Wood Street in the north chapel near his grandfather Sir John Cheke.

== Family ==
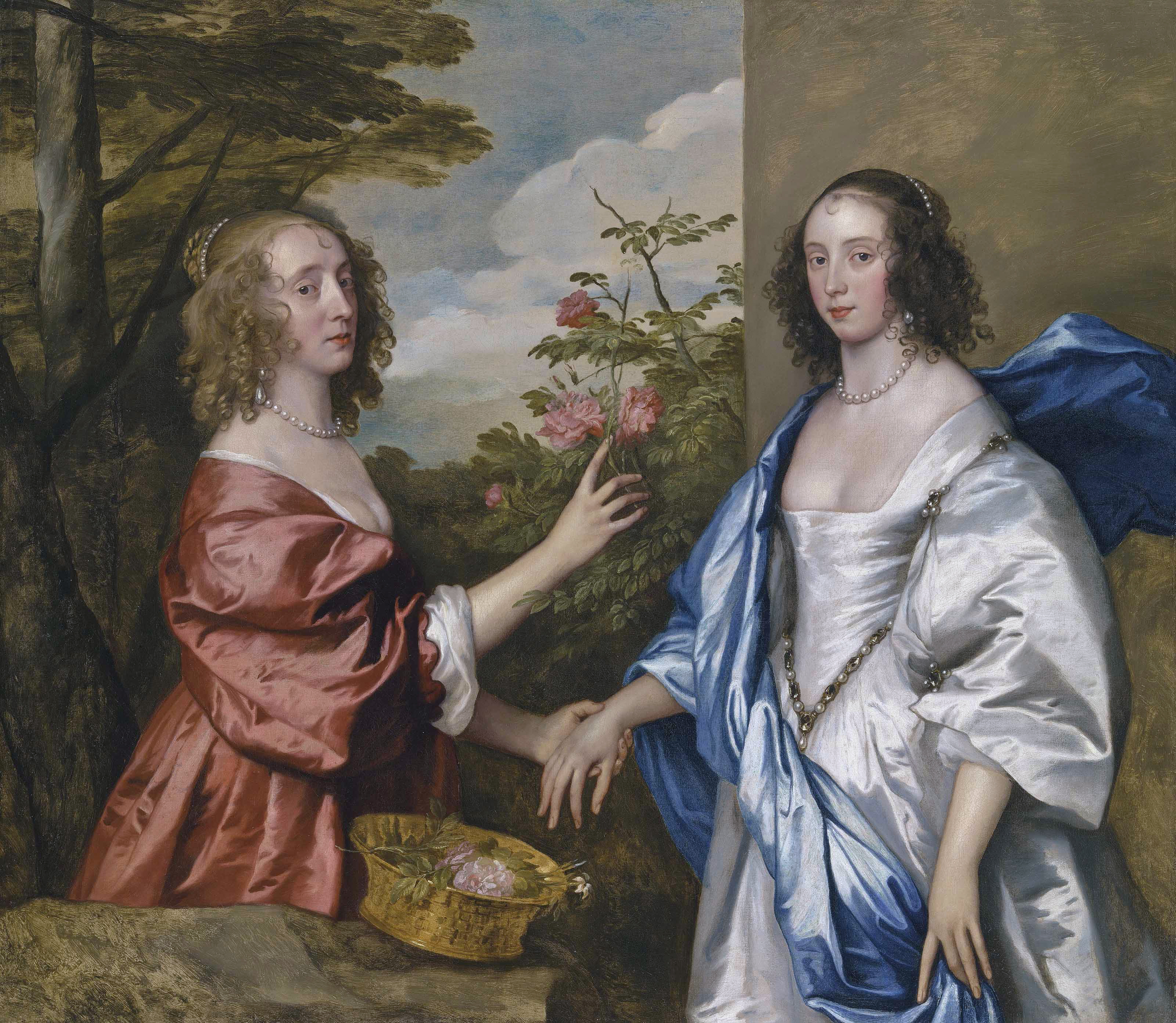
The Cheeke girls, Essex and Anne, painted by van Dyck

Thomas Cheek's first wife was Katharine, a daughter of Peter Osborne and his wife Anne Blyth. Osborne was a very loyal friend of Cheek's grandfather, and had given him a home in his last months following his release from the Tower of London in 1556. Anne Osborne was the daughter of John Blyth, first Regius Professor of Physick in the University of Cambridge (1540), who had married Sir John Cheke's sister. Thomas Cheek therefore married his own second cousin: they were married for nearly twenty years. Online genealogies note they had a son, Anthony, but this appears to be a backformation or wishful thinking, and no such records exist--in fact on his wife's death, he hurriedly remarried to obtain an heir..

Katharine Cheek died on 11 February 1615 of sepsis or gangrene after being bled by the queen's surgeon for a minor complaint.

He married secondly Lady Essex Rich, third daughter of Robert Rich, 1st Earl of Warwick. They had three sons and six daughters.

- Robert Cheeke
- Thomas Cheeke of Pirgo
- Charles Cheeke
- Frances Cheeke, married Lancelot Lake.
- Essex Cheeke, later Dame Essex Bevil and then Countess of Manchester; she married:
  - (1) Sir Robert Bevil, KB,
  - (2) Edward Montagu, 2nd Earl of Manchester (1602-1671), as his third wife, on 30 December 1642. Montagu was previously married to her cousin Lady Anne Rich (d. 1641/2), daughter of Robert Rich, 2nd Earl of Warwick. (Lady Anne Rich was Manchester's second wife, and the mother of his heir.) Of their children,
    - Robert Montagu, 3rd Earl of Manchester (b. 1634) was father of the 1st Duke of Manchester.
    - Lady Anne Montagu (d. circa 1689) married her second cousin (as his 2nd wife) Robert Rich, 5th Earl of Warwick, the son of Henry Rich, 1st Earl of Holland (a younger son of the 1st Earl of Warwick).
    - Lady Essex Montagu (died 1677) married Henry Ingram, 1st Viscount of Irvine (7 June 1661).
- Anne Cheeke, later Countess of Warwick and then Countess of Clanricarde; she married:
  - (1) Richard Rogers,
  - (2) Robert Rich, 3rd Earl of Warwick (1611-1659), her cousin (as his second wife). They had issue three daughters, who were raised by their uncle Charles Rich, 4th Earl of Warwick (d. 1673) and his second wife Lady Mary Boyle (d. 1678).
  - (3) Richard Burke, 8th Earl of Clanricarde.
- Isabel Cheeke, later Dame Isabel Gerard; married Sir Francis Gerard, 2nd Baronet (1617-1680).
- Elizabeth Cheeke, married Sir Richard Franklyn, 1st Baronet
- Jane Cheek
- Lucie Cheeke.

== See also ==
- Politics of the United Kingdom
- Parliament of England

Parliament of England
Preceded by Sir Robert Killigrew; Sir Edward Seymour	Member of Parliament for Newport; 1614; With: Thomas Trevor	Succeeded by Sir Robert Killigrew; Sir Edward Barrett
Preceded by Sir Harbottle Grimston; Sir Charles Montagu	Member of Parliament for Harwich; 1620–1622; With: Edward Grimston	Succeeded by Sir Nathaniel Rich; Christopher Herrys
Preceded by Thomas Wise; Thomas Keightley	Member of Parliament for Bere Alston; 1624; With: Thomas Jermyn jun.	Succeeded by Thomas Jermyn jun. William Strode
Preceded by Sir Francis Barrington, 1st Baronet; Sir John Deane	Member of Parliament for Essex; 1624; With: Sir Francis Barrington, 1st Baronet	Succeeded by Sir Francis Barrington, 1st Baronet; Sir Arthur Harris
Preceded by Thomas Jermyn jun. William Strode	Member of Parliament for Bere Alston; 1625; With: William Strode	Succeeded by Thomas Wise; William Strode
Preceded by Sir William Masham, 1st Baronet; Sir Henry Mildmay	Member of Parliament for Maldon; 1626; With: Sir William Masham, 1st Baronet	Succeeded by Sir Henry Mildmay; Sir Arthur Harris
Preceded by Edward Alford; William Towse	Member of Parliament for Colchester; 1628–1629; With: Edward Alford	Parliament suspended until 1640
Parliament suspended since 1629	Member of Parliament for Harwich; 1640–1653; With: Sir John Jacob, 1st Baronet 1640; Sir Harbottle Grimston, 1st Baronet 1640–1647; Capel Luckyn 1647–1648	Not represented in Barebones Parliament
