= Robert Rich, 3rd Earl of Warwick =

English earl (1611–1659)

The Right Honourable Robert Rich
- Earl of Warwick
- Coat of arms: Arms of Rich: Gules, a chevron between three crosses botonée or
- Tenure: 1658–1659 (Earl of Warwick); 1641–1659 (Baron Rich)
- Predecessor: Robert Rich, 2nd Earl of Warwick
- Successor: Charles Rich, 4th Earl of Warwick
- Other titles: Baron Rich
- Born: 28 June 1611
- Died: 29 May 1659 (aged 47)
- Buried: Felsted
- Spouses: Lady Anne Cavendish (m. 1632; died 1638) Anne Cheeke (m. 1645)
- Issue: Robert Rich, Baron Rich; Lady Anne Rich; Lady Mary Rich; Lady Essex Rich
- Father: Robert Rich, 2nd Earl of Warwick
- Mother: Frances Hatton

Robert Rich, 3rd Earl of Warwick (28 June 1611 – 29 May 1659 in London), supported the Royalist cause in the English Civil War (his father the 2nd Earl supported the Parliament of England).

== Biography ==
Robert Rich was the eldest son of Robert Rich, 2nd Earl of Warwick and Frances Hatton, daughter of Sir William Hatton, the nephew and heir of Sir Christopher Hatton (Lord Chancellor of England). He was made a Knight of the Bath on 1 February 1625 at the coronation of King Charles I, along with his uncle St John Blount.

Rich, as Baron Rich, of Leighs, Essex, joined King Charles I at York, but never bore arms; and the fine imposed upon him by Parliament was remitted at his father's petition.

His father, the second earl, died in April 1658, passing on the earldom. Rich died on 29 May 1659, and was buried in Felsted, Essex. His only son, also Robert, had died of consumption some two years earlier. The earldom passed to the 3rd Earl's brother Charles.

== Family ==
Rich married firstly Lady Anne Cavendish, the daughter of William Cavendish, 2nd Earl of Devonshire, on 9 April 1632 at Battersea, Surrey. Their only child, Robert, married Frances Cromwell, daughter of the Lord Protector Oliver Cromwell in 1657, but died of consumption within three months of the marriage on 16 February 1658, leaving no children. His widow married secondly Sir John Russell, 3rd Baronet.

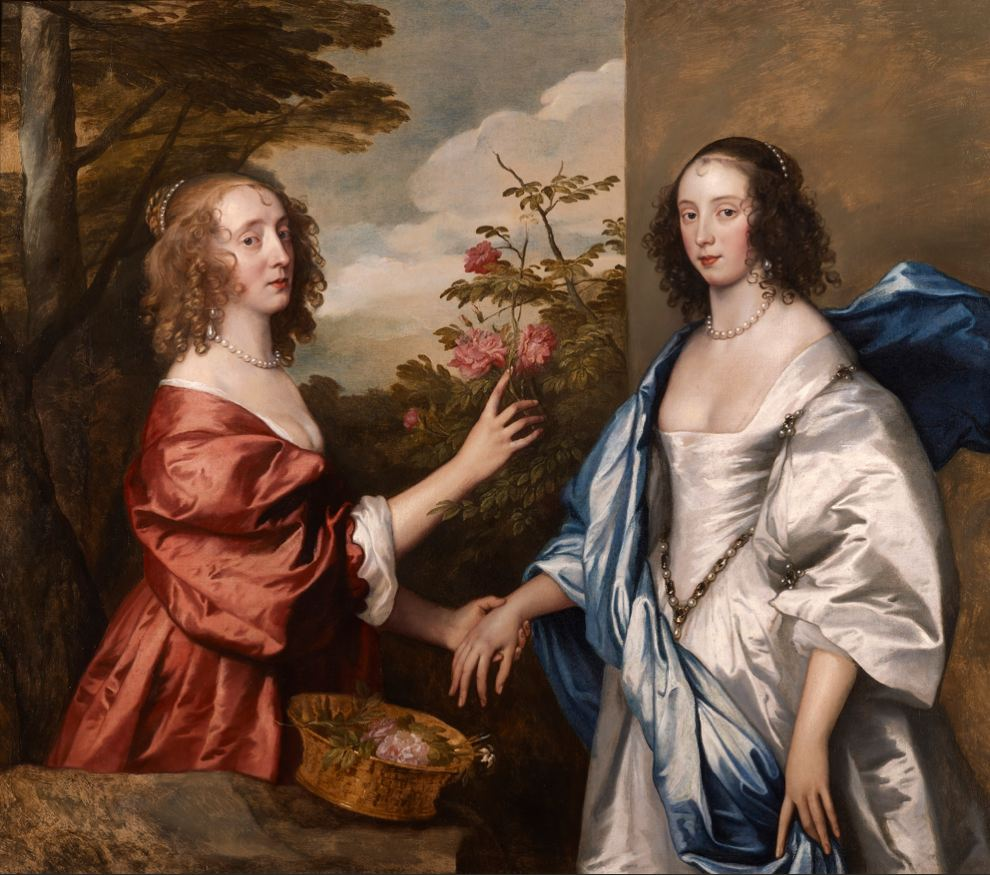
Essex Cheeke and Anne Cheeke (later Countess of Warwick) by Van Dyck

Robert Rich married secondly his first cousin, Anne Cheeke, daughter of Sir Thomas Cheek and Lady Essex Rich (his aunt) on 3 October 1645 in Fryarne, Middlesex. Their children were:

- Anne who married Thomas Barrington of Barrington Hall. Essex, eldest son and heir of Sir John Barrington, 3rd Baronet, who predeceased his father.
- Mary who married Henry St John, 1st Viscount St John on 11 December 1673 and died in 1678, giving birth to their only son, Henry, Viscount Bolingbroke.
- Essex Rich, who married Daniel Finch, 2nd Earl of Nottingham on 16 June 1674.

Rich family tree

Baron Rich of Leez (England), 1547
Richard Rich; 1496/7–1567; 1st Baron Rich	Elizabeth Jenks; 1510–1558
Ann or Jane Machell b. 1557	Richard Rich (illegitimate) d. 1598	Robert Rich c. 1537–1581; 2nd Baron Rich	Elizabeth Baldry
Earl of Warwick (3rd creation, England), 1618
Robert Rich d. 1630	Nathaniel Rich; 1585–1636	Honora Worlick	Edwin Rich; 1561–1600	Robert Rich; 1559–1618; 1st Earl of Warwick, 3rd Baron Rich	Penelope Devereux; 1563–1607
Rich Baronet, of London (England), 1676	Baron Kensington (1st creation), 1623; Earl of Holland (England), 1624
Elizabeth Hampden d. 1655 (cousin of John Hampden)	Colonel Nathaniel Rich d. c. 1701	Edwin Rich; 1594–1675	Charles Rich c. 1619–1677; 1st Baronet	Elizabeth Cholmeley d. 1694	Robert Rich; 1587–1658; 2nd Earl of Warwick, 4th Baron Rich	Frances Hatton; 1590–1623	Isabella Rich b. c. 1590	Isabel Cope d. 1655	Henry Rich; 1590–1649; 1st Earl of Holland, etc.
Robert Rich c. 1648–1699; 2nd Baronet	Mary Rich d. 1714	Edward Montagu; 1602–1671; Earl of Manchester	Anne Rich; 1604–1641/42	Robert Rich; 1611–1659; 3rd Earl of Warwick, 5th Baron Rich	Mary Boyle; 1625–1678	Charles Rich; 1619–1673; 4th Earl of Warwick, 6th Baron Rich
Robert Montagu; 1634–1683; Earl of Manchester	Anne Montagu d. c. 1689	Robert Rich c. 1619–1675; 5th Earl of Warwick, 7th Baron Rich, 2nd Earl of Holland, etc.	James Thynne; 1605–1670	Isabella Rich; 1623–1670	John Campbell; 1636–1717; Earl of Breadalbane and Holland	Mary Rich; 1632–1666	Cope Rich; 1634–1676 (Spouse unknown)
Charles Rich c. 1680–1706; 3rd Baronet	Robert Rich; 1685–1768; 4th Baronet	Elizabeth Griffith b. c. 1692–1773	Charlotte Myddleton; 1680–1731 daughter of Thomas Myddelton)	Edward Rich; 1673–1701; 6th Earl of Warwick, 8th Baron Rich, 3rd Earl of Holland, etc.	Elizabeth Rich d. 1725	Francis Edwardes d. 1725	Earls of Breadalbane and Holland (Campbell family)	Cope Rich d. 1706 (Spouse unknown)
Baron Kensington (2nd creation, Ireland), 1776
Robert Rich; 1717–1785; 5th Baronet	George Rich; 1728–1799; 6th Baronet	Edward Henry Rich d. 1721; 7th Earl of Warwick, 9th Baron Rich, 4th Earl of Holland, etc.	Barons Kensington (Edwardes family)	Edward Henry Rich; 1695–1759; 8th Earl of Warwick, 10th Baron Rich, 5th Earl of Holland, etc.,
All English titles extinct, 1759

Parliament of England
Preceded by Sir Harbottle Grimston; Sir Francis Barrington, Bt	Member of Parliament for Essex; 1629; With: Sir Harbottle Grimston	Parliament suspended until 1640
Preceded by Sir Thomas Barrington; Sir Harbottle Grimston	Member of Parliament for Essex; 1640–1641; With: Sir William Masham	Succeeded by Sir William Masham; Sir Martin Lumley
Peerage of England
Preceded by Robert Rich	Earl of Warwick; 1658–1659	Succeeded by Charles Rich
Preceded by Robert Rich	Baron Rich (writ in acceleration); 1641–1659	Succeeded by Charles Rich
