= Thomas Hastings (Royal Navy officer) =

Royal Navy Admiral (1790–1870)

Admiral Sir Thomas Hastings KCB DL
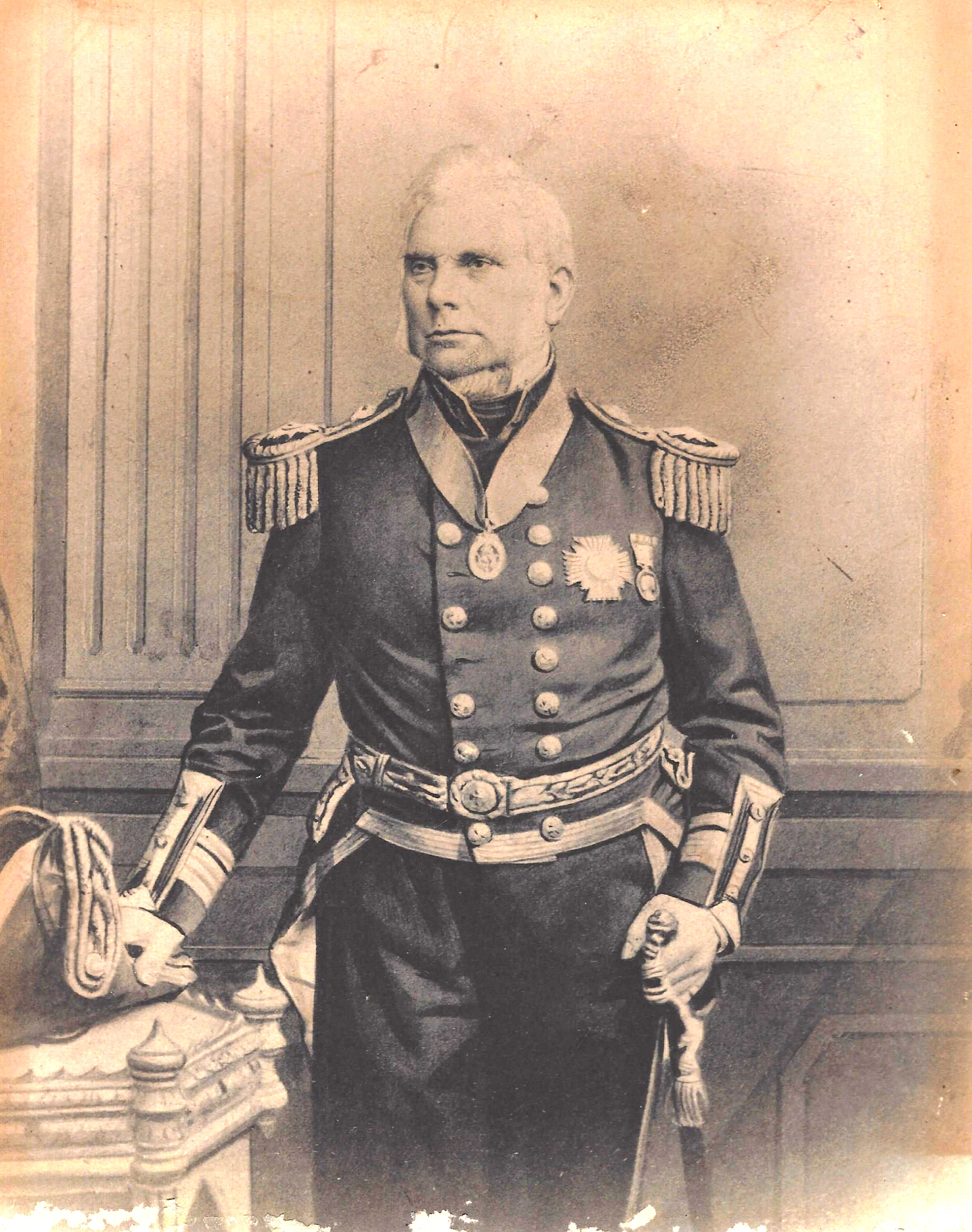
- Born: 3 July 1790; Whichford, Warwickshire, England
- Died: 3 January 1870 (aged 79); London, England
- Military career
- Allegiance: United Kingdom
- Branch: Royal Navy
- Rank: Admiral
- Commands: HMS Ferret; HMS Excellent
- Conflicts: French Revolutionary Wars; Napoleonic Wars

Admiral Sir Thomas Hastings KCB DL (3 July 1790 – 3 January 1870) was an innovator, instructor, and distinguished officer of the Royal Navy. He was renowned as an expert gunner, and some believe him to be the first officer to take a truly scientific approach to gunnery.

== Biography ==
Hastings was born on 3 July 1790, the third son (and fifth child) of Rev. James Hastings (later Rector of Martley, Worcestershire) and Elizabeth (née Paget). He was brother to Sir Charles Hastings (founder of the British Medical Association). Another brother, Francis Decimus Hastings (1796–1869), also served in the Royal Navy from the age of twelve, reaching the rank of Rear-Admiral in 1859 having been obliged to relinquish active service because of his wounds, hardships and length of service.

On 29 April 1812, Hastings participated in an attack led by Captain Thomas Ussher on French privateers of Málaga, in which he performed admirably, commanding twenty men in the attack.

In 1814, as a first lieutenant of the Undaunted, he escorted Napoleon into his exile on Elba, and was one of three officers responsible for the arrangements for the arrival of Napoleon. From 14 November 1828 until 22 July 1830, he commanded Ferret in the Mediterranean with the rank of commander. He was then promoted captain.

On 13 April 1832, Captain Hastings took command of the sixth-rate training ship Excellent. As far back as 1817 General Sir Howard Douglas had submitted plans to remedy the obvious deficiencies of British naval gunnery. Nothing was done until 1830 when Commander George Smith was appointed to "superintend the practice of Sea Gunnery" on board that ship at Portsmouth. The gunnery school was put on a permanent basis by Captain Thomas Hastings (known at the time as "Old Sting").

He became noted for his training methods, although some in the admiralty disapproved of his emphasis on science, and found his reports on gunnery confusing, as they had little knowledge of science themselves. From a life of Sir John Barrow, the Secretary to the Admiralty through most of the first half of the 19th century, an interesting account appears; two years after Hastings' appointment to Excellent, Sir John Briggs, Reader to the Board, happened to show the examination paper to an Admiral on the Board.

"Do you know, it is very strange, but I do not understand all this. Pray, Sir, what is the meaning of 'impact'?" "I rather think that it means the force of the blow", replied Briggs. The Admiral turned to another Naval Lord, Sir John Beresford, and asked him: "What in the name of good fortune is meant by 'initial velocity'?" "I'll be hanged if I know", answered Sir John, "but I suppose it is some of Tom Hastings' scientific bosh; I'll tell you what I think we had better do - we'll go at once to Lord de Grey (First Lord) and get that Excellent paid off."
However, the First Lord replied: "I am afraid, my dear Beresford, I cannot sanction it, for you have no idea how damned scientific that House of Commons has become."

He was knighted in 1839. The first diving training in the Royal Navy occurred in 1844 under Hastings' watch.

He left command of Excellent on 28 August 1845, after his appointment as Storekeeper of the Ordnance on 25 July 1845. He held that post until it was abolished with the dissolution of the Board of Ordnance in 1855. On 27 September 1855 he was promoted rear admiral, and on 4 October 1862 vice admiral. On 2 April 1866, he retired from the navy with the rank of admiral. He died on 3 January 1870 at his home in London.

== See also ==
- O'Byrne, William Richard (1849). "Hastings, Thomas" . A Naval Biographical Dictionary . John Murray – via Wikisource.

Political offices
Preceded by Francis Robert Bonham	Storekeeper of the Ordnance; 1845–1855	Succeeded by Office abolished
