= George Drought Warburton =

Irish soldier, politician and writer (1816–1857)

George Drought Warburton (1816–1857) was an Irish soldier, politician and writer on Canada.

== Life ==
The third son of George Warburton of Aughrim, County Galway, and younger brother of Bartholomew Elliott George Warburton, known as Eliot, he was born at Wicklow. He was educated at the Royal Military College, Woolwich, and served in the Royal Artillery from June 1833.

In 1837 Warburton was sent with a detachment of the royal artillery to assist the Auxiliary Legion in Spain, and was seriously wounded in action. In the middle of July 1844 he embarked from Chatham for Canada. He returned from Canada in 1846, and was later stationed at Landguard Fort, near Harwich in Essex.

In November 1854 Warburton retired from the army as major on full pay, and resided at Henley House, Frant, Sussex. On 28 March 1857 he was elected by a large majority as an independent liberal member for Harwich. Apparently subject to pains, he shot himself through the head at Henley House on 23 October 1857, aged 41. He was buried at Iffley, near Oxford.

== Works ==
Warburton wrote a description of the dominion of Canada, under its ancient vernacular name, as Hochelaga; or England in the New World (1846). The work was published anonymously, in two volumes, as "edited by Eliot Warburton", and the fifth edition, revised, came out in 1854. It was also printed in New York, although the part on the United States was uncomplimentary. He wrote also:

- The Conquest of Canada (1850), anonymous, in two volumes. This passed through three British editions in England, and was issued at New York in 1850.
- Memoir of Charles Mordaunt, Earl of Peterborough and Monmouth, by the author of "Hochelaga" (1853), 2 vols.

== Family ==
Warburton married at St. George's, Hanover Square, on 1 June 1853, Elizabeth Augusta Bateman-Hanbury, third daughter of William Hanbury Bateman, 1st Baron Bateman, and had an only daughter, who became the wife of Lord Edward Spencer-Churchill, son of George Spencer-Churchill, 6th Duke of Marlborough. In April 1869 his widow married George Rushout, 3rd Baron Northwick, and she was in 1886 the recipient of the Dunmow flitch.
