= Thomas Heath (politician) =

English politician

Thomas Heath (after. 1674 – 7 September 1741) was an English politician and East India Company merchant. He served as MP for Haslemere from 22 November 1704 till 1705 and MP for Harwich from 17 May till 29 June 1714 and 1715 till 1722.

He was the first son of William Heath and Jane Heath (nee Pike). He married Catherine Bayley and had two sons and one daughter.
