= Thomas King (died 1688) =

English merchant and politician

Thomas King (died 1688) was an English merchant and politician who sat in the House of Commons at various times between 1659 and 1679.

King married into a merchant family of Great Yarmouth, Norfolk and became a freeman of Yarmouth in 1647. He was a victualler to the parliamentary navy. In 1650 he moved his business to Harwich but in 1657 the house he had built and his warehouse were requisitioned by parliament for a new dockyard. He then moved to London. In 1659, he was elected Member of Parliament for Harwich in the Third Protectorate Parliament. He was commissioner for assessment for Essex from August 1660 to 1679.

In 1661 King was elected MP for Harwich again in the Cavalier Parliament. He was commissioner for corporations for Essex from 1662 to 1663 and commissioner for assessment for Harwich from 1663 to 1679. King's parliamentary career was characterised by a pursuit of parliamentary income and suspicions of financial irregularity. He was one of the instigators of the Royal Fishery Company on which Samuel Pepys published a highly critical report in 1664. Pepys found King had hung on to £429 of voluntary subscriptions and "insinuated in his accounts" that he had assigned the lease of his house worth £700 at Harwich to the Fishing Company . Pepys suggested it would be useful "to inquire whether this house was not long ago otherwise disposed of by him" and pointed out another instance where King was defrauding the Company.

King was deputy collector of hearth-tax for Suffolk from 1666 to 1667 and his partners accused him of withholding funds during the three-year farm. He was a gentleman of the privy chamber from 1671 to 1685. He was commissioner for recusants for Essex in 1675. In November 1675, King entered a claim for parliamentary wages of £238 6s. because he claimed his "own private affairs were neglected" while he had to live in London and Westminster for constant attendance in Parliament. He was satirized for his penury and subservience in "The Chequer Inn", a poem written in connection with the impeachment of Danby who was making financial gains from his position as MP. He was described in "Flagellum Parliamentarium", a satire attributed to Andrew Marvell, as "a poor beggarly fellow who sold his vote to the treasurer for £50 bribe" while in "A Seasonable Argument" he was called "a pensioner for £50 a session, etc., meat and drink, and now and then a suit of clothes". The corporation of Harwich said they were unable to meet King's claim, but deposited £90 with Sir Anthony Deane in 1677 to be invested on their behalf. In the winter of 1678 King nearly died of pleurisy, but "crept to the House" to vote for the Government. He received £2,486, between February 1680 and April 1688 either as interest for a loan he had made to Charles I, or "as of free gift and royal bounty".

King died between April and October 1688 when the bounty was paid to his widow.

King married firstly on 18 January 1647, Mary Gooch, daughter of Charles Gooch, merchant of Great Yarmouth, and had a son. His second wife was called Alice and she gave him two sons. His son Thomas was MP for Queenborough between 1696 and 1722.

Parliament of England
Preceded by Not represented in Second Protectorate Parliament	Member of Parliament for Harwich; 1659; With: John Sicklemore	Succeeded by Not represented in Restored Rump
Preceded by Sir Capel Luckyn, 2nd Baronet; Sir Henry Wright, 1st Baronet	Member of Parliament for Harwich; 1661–1679; With: Sir Henry Wright, 1st Baronet 1661–1664; Sir Capel Luckyn, 2nd Baronet 1664–1679	Succeeded by Sir Anthony Dean; Samuel Pepys
