= Laurence Wright (physician) =

English physician

Laurence Wright (1590–1657), was an English physician, notably physician in ordinary to Oliver Cromwell and to the Charterhouse.

== Biography ==
Wright was the third son of John Wright of Wright's Bridge, near Hornchurch in Essex, was born in 1590. He matriculated a pensioner of Emmanuel College, Cambridge, in March 1608, and proceeded B.A. the following year. He entered as a medical student at Leyden on 22 August 1612, but graduated M.A. at Cambridge in 1618.

He was admitted a candidate of the Royal College of Physicians on 22 December 1618, elected fellow on 22 December 1622, censor in 1628 and 1639, named an elect on 24 May 1642, conciliarius in 1647, and again from 1650 annually till his death in 1657. Wright was a physician in ordinary to Cromwell and to the Charterhouse. To the latter post he was elected on 25 May 1624, and resigned it in 1643. He was chosen governor of the Charterhouse on 21 March 1652. Wright owned property at Henham and Havering in Essex. He died on 3 October 1657, and was buried in the church of South Weald.

== Family ==
He married Mary, daughter of John Duke, physician, of Foulton Hall, Ramsey, Essex, and Colchester. She survived him till 16 February 1698, being also buried at South Weald. Of Wright's two sons:

- Laurence was expelled from a fellowship at Trinity College, Cambridge, during the Commonwealth, but readmitted in 1660, and took the degree of M.D. in 1666.
- A second son Sir Henry Wright (1636–1663), who was added to the trade committee of the council of state on 5 February 1656, was made a baronet by Cromwell on 10 April 1658, in which dignity he was confirmed on 11 June 1660; he married Anne (d 1708), daughter of John Crew, first baron Crew of Stene, by whom he had a son and a daughter; the baronetcy expired on the death of his son in 1681.
