= Arthur Lever =

British Liberal Party politician

Sir Arthur Lever 1st Baronet

Member of Parliament for Hackney Central
- In office 15 November 1922 – 16 November 1923
- Preceded by: William Woolcock
- Succeeded by: Leonard Benjamin Franklin

Member of Parliament for Harwich
- In office 8 February 1906 – 10 February 1910
- Preceded by: James Round
- Succeeded by: Harry Newton

Personal details
- Born: Arthur Levy; 17 November 1860
- Died: 23 August 1924 (aged 63)
- Party: National Liberal
- Other political affiliations: Liberal

Sir Arthur Levy Lever, 1st Baronet (17 November 1860 – 23 August 1924), known as Arthur Levy until 1896, was a British Liberal Party politician.

== Background ==
Born Arthur Levy, a son of Joseph Levy, of Leicester. He was educated at University College School and privately. In 1896 he married Beatrice Falk. In 1900, they had a son, Tresham Joseph Philip Lever. Beatrice died in 1917. He assumed the surname of Lever in lieu of Levy by deed poll in 1896 and by Royal licence in 1911.

== Military career ==
He joined the army. He served with the 2nd V.B. Royal Fusiliers. He reached the rank of Major before retiring. Following the outbreak of war in 1914, he was re-commissioned. He served in the European War as a Major in the 2/1st Battalion London Regiment of the Royal Fusiliers. He then moved to serve on the Headquarters’ Staff, Southern Command, with rank of Colonel. He was Deputy Director of Recruiting for South-Eastern Region in 1917.

== Political career ==
Arthur Lever

Lever was elected Member of Parliament (MP) for Harwich in 1906.

He served as a Justice of the Peace in Essex. In 1906 he was appointed to the Royal Commission on Coast Erosion and Afforestation, serving until 1911. He lost his Harwich seat to the Conservatives at the January 1910 General Election. At the December 1910 General Election he stood unsuccessfully at Wolverhampton South.

In 1911 he was made a Baronet, of Hans Crescent in Chelsea. He was a Member of the London War Pensions Committee. He was returned to the House of Commons at the 1922 general election as National Liberal MP for Hackney Central,

He stood down at the 1923 general election.

His elder brother Maurice Levy was also a Liberal politician and was created a Baronet in 1913.

=== Election results ===
General election 1906 Harwich Electorate 13,144
Party	Candidate	Votes	%	±%
Liberal	Arthur Lever	5,650	51.6	n/a
Conservative	Harry Newton	5,308	48.4	n/a
Majority		342	3.2	n/a
Turnout		10,958	83.4	n/a
Liberal gain from Conservative		Swing	n/a	

General election 1922:Hackney Central Electorate 35,033
Party	Candidate	Votes	%	±%
National Liberal	Arthur Lever	9,795	46.4	n/a
Liberal	Thomas McKinnon Wood	6,825	32.3	n/a
Labour	Arthur Lynch	4,507	21.3	n/a
Majority		2,970	14.1	n/a
Turnout		21,127	60.3	n/a
National Liberal gain from Liberal		Swing	n/a	

Parliament of the United Kingdom
Preceded by James Round	Member of Parliament for Harwich; 1906 – January 1910	Succeeded by Harry Newton
Preceded by William Woolcock	Member of Parliament for Hackney Central; 1922 – 1923	Succeeded by Leonard Franklin
Baronetage of the United Kingdom
New creation	Baronet (of Hans Crescent); 1911–1924	Succeeded by Tresham Lever
