= Albert Hillary =

Albert Ernest Hillary

Member of Parliament for Harwich
- In office 15 November 1922 – 9 October 1924
- Preceded by: Harry Newton
- Succeeded by: Sir Frederick Gill Rice

Personal details
- Born: 25 January 1880 Tow Law, County Durham
- Died: 10 February 1954 (aged 74) Frinton-on-Sea, Essex
- Party: Liberal
- Spouse: Annie Bartleet

Albert Ernest Hillary (20 January 1868 – 10 February 1954) was an English chocolate manufacturer and Liberal politician.

== Family ==
Hillary was the son of John Hillary of Dans Castle, Tow Law, County Durham. In 1897 he married Annie Maud Mary Bartleet of Sparkhill. They had one son and a daughter. Annie Hillary died in 1945 but Hillary did not remarry.

== Career ==
By profession Hillary was managing director of Carson's Ltd. chocolate manufacturers of Glasgow. He also served as a justice of the peace.

== Politics ==
Hillary first stood for Parliament for the Barnard Castle Division of County Durham as a Liberal at the 1918 general election but came third in a four cornered contest, behind the victorious Labour candidate, John Edmund Swan, and the Coalition Conservative, John Rogerson. The Independent, O Monkhouse, standing on a ticket of agricultural and farming affairs came fourth.

For the 1922 general election, Hillary switched seats to the Harwich Division of Essex. In a straight fight with the Conservative candidate, G StJ Strutt, Hillary won the seat by a majority of 764 votes – rather against the expected result, given the strength of the Conservative Party in the county. He held the seat in the 1923 general election, again in a straight fight with the Tories who were this time represented by Sir Frederick Gill Rice, by a majority of 1,917. However, in the 1924, with the Liberals in national decline and with the intervention of a Labour candidate, Rice won the seat from Hillary by a majority of 2,315 with Labour losing their deposit.

Hillary carried on as Liberal candidate in Harwich until 1928 but then resigned. He did not try for election to the House of Commons again.

== Death ==
Hillary died on 10 February 1954 at the age of 86 years. At the time of his death he resided at Royston, Frinton-on-Sea, Essex.

Parliament of the United Kingdom
Preceded by Harry Newton	Member of Parliament for Harwich; 1922 – 1924	Succeeded by Sir Frederick Gill Rice
