= Jacob baronets =

Extinct baronetcy in the Baronetage of England

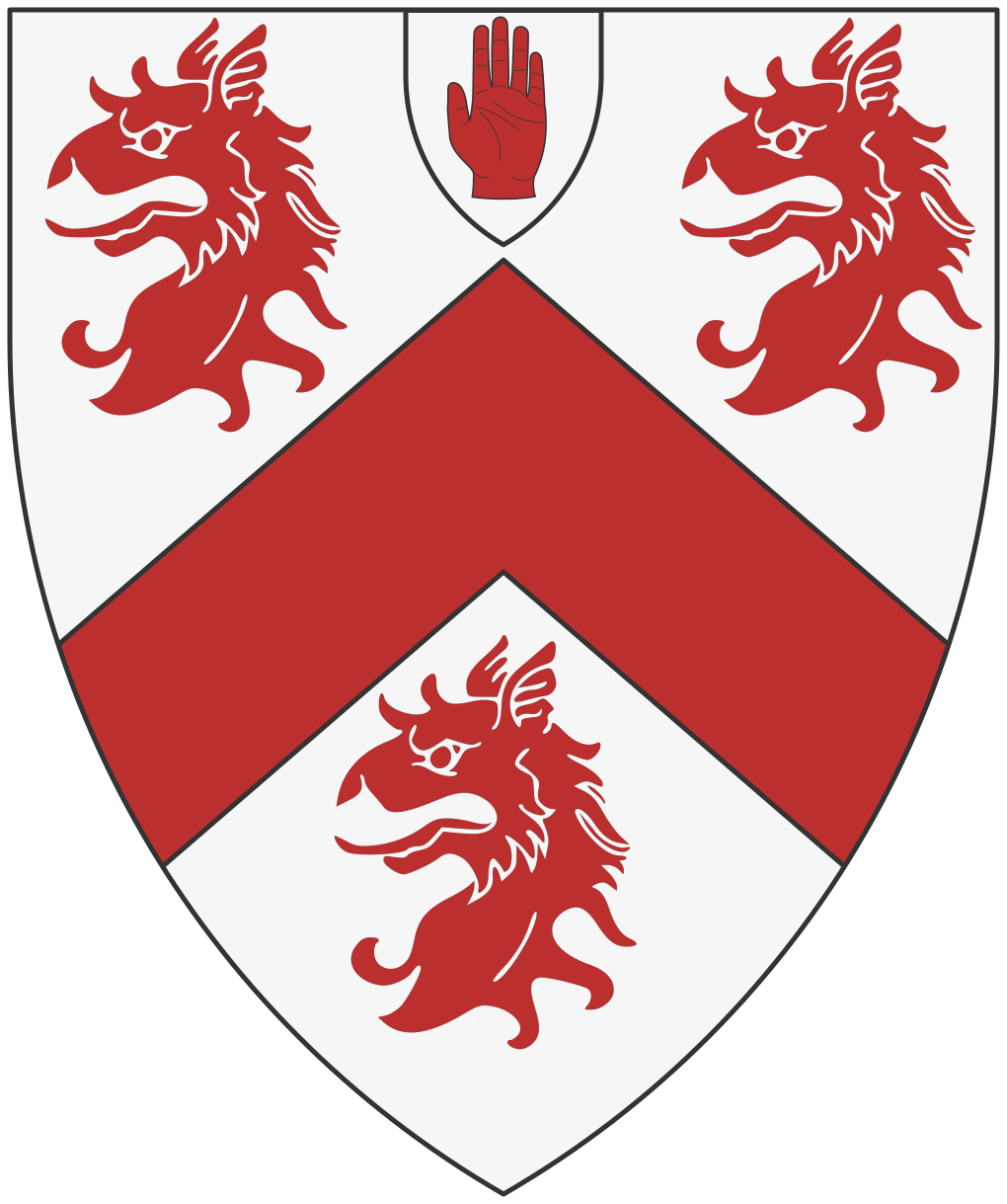
The coat of arms of Jacob of Bromley, Baronets.

The Jacob Baronetcy of Bromley in the County of Middlesex was a title in the Baronetage of England. It was created on 11 January 1665 for John Jacob, with remainder in default of male issue of his own to his brother Robert Jacob and the heirs male of his body. The title was in recognition of his loyalty to Charles I. The title became extinct on the death of the fifth Baronet.

The writer Hildebrand Jacob was the son of the 3rd baronet, whom he predeceased, and father of the 4th.

== Jacob baronets, of Bromley (1665) ==
- Sir John Jacob, 1st Baronet (c. 1598–1666)
- Sir John Jacob, 2nd Baronet (c. 1633–1674)
- Sir John Jacob, 3rd Baronet (c. 1665–1740)
  - Hildebrand Jacob (c.1693–1739), eldest son of the 3rd Baronet and father of the 4th Baronet
- Sir Hildebrand Jacob, 4th Baronet (c. 1718–1790)
- Sir Clement bridges Jacob, 5th Baronet (d. 1804)
