= John Pybus =

Sir John Pybus Bt CBE

Minister of Transport
- In office 3 September 1931 – 22 February 1933
- Prime Minister: Ramsay MacDonald
- Preceded by: Herbert Morrison
- Succeeded by: Oliver Stanley

Member of Parliament for Harwich
- In office 30 May 1929 – 23 October 1935
- Preceded by: Sir Frederick Gill Rice
- Succeeded by: Stanley Holmes

Personal details
- Born: 25 January 1880
- Died: 23 October 1935 (aged 55)
- Party: National Liberal
- Other political affiliations: Liberal

Sir Percy John Pybus, 1st Baronet, CBE (25 January 1880 – 23 October 1935) was a British Liberal Party politician.

== Business career ==
Having completed an engineering apprenticeship John Pybus joined electrical engineers Phoenix Dynamo Manufacturing Company when aged 26. During World War I he was appointed managing director. Phoenix became a major constituent of the amalgamation of businesses named English Electric in 1918 and Pybus became a joint managing director with two others. He was appointed managing director of English Electric in March 1921 and chairman in April 1926. He was a member of many boards of directors including The Times newspaper and chairman of others including Phoenix Assurance.

In October 1928 he was selected as Liberal candidate for the Harwich Division. He remained a director of English Electric.

== Parliament ==
Pybus was first elected at the May 1929 general election, as the Liberal Member of Parliament for Harwich in Essex.

In 1931, when Labour Prime Minister Ramsay MacDonald split the party and formed a National Government. Pybus was one of the Liberal MPs to receive a ministerial post but then left to help form the breakaway Liberal National Party. Re-elected in Harwich at the 1931 general election as a Liberal National, Pybus served as Minister of Transport from 1931 until 1933.

== Honours ==
Created a Commander of the British Empire in 1917 he was made a baronet, of Harwich in the County of Essex, in January 1934, and died on 23 October 1935, just weeks before the 1935 general election. His title became extinct on his death.

Parliament of the United Kingdom
Preceded by Sir Frederick Gill Rice	Member of Parliament for Harwich; 1929–1935	Succeeded by Sir Stanley Holmes
Political offices
Preceded by Herbert Morrison	Minister of Transport; 1931–1933	Succeeded by Oliver Stanley
Baronetage of the United Kingdom
New creation	Baronet (of Harwick); 1934–1935	Extinct
