= Sir Henry Wright, 1st Baronet =

Sir Henry Wright, 1st Baronet (c. 1637–1664) was a member of parliament for Harwich in the parliaments of 1660 and 1661.

== Biography ==
Henry Wright was the only surviving son and heir of Laurence Wright (c. 1590–1657) M.D., of London, and of Dagenham, and Mary, daughter of John Duke M.D., of Toulton Hall, in Ramsey and of Colchester, Essex, was born about 1637.

Wright was added to the trade committee of the Council of State on 5 February 1656, He succeeded to his father's estate on his father's death on 3 October 1657, for whose services as physician to the Lord Protector Oliver Cromwell, presumably, Henry was created a baronet by the Lord Protector on 10 April 1658, a dignity which, was disallowed after the Restoration in May 1660.

However a few weeks later Wright was, notwithstanding his recent recognition of the late government, again created a baronet on 11 June 1660 by King Charles II. It is not easy to conjecture what service he had rendered to be thus highly favoured.

He was Member of Parliament for Harwich in the Convention Parliament of 1660 and in 1661 he was re-elected MP for Harwich in the Cavalier Parliament and sat until his death. He died on 5 February 1664, aged 27, and was buried at South Weald, Essex. His son Sir Henry Wright, 2nd Baronet succeed to his father's estates and title.

== Family ==
He married, on 23 March 1658, at St Giles-in-the-Fields, Anne, daughter of Lord John Crew, 1st Baron Crew and Lady Jemima, daughter and coheir of Edward Waldegrave. His widow died on 27 September 1708, aged 71, and was also buried at South Weald. They had one son:

- Henry (1662–1681), of Dagenham. He was baptised on 1 July 1662 at St Giles-in-the-Fields. He succeed to the Baronetcy on 5 February 1664. He died unmarried in 1681 aged 19 (the Baronetcy became extinct), and he was buried at South Weald.

== Notes ==
Parliament of England
Preceded by Not represented in Restored Rump	Member of Parliament for Harwich; 1660–1664; With: Sir Capel Luckyn, Bt 1660; Thomas King 1661–1664	Succeeded by Thomas King; Sir Capel Luckyn, Bt
Baronetage of England
New creation	Baronet (of Dagenham); 1660–1664	Succeeded by Henry Wright
