= Frederick Rice (British politician) =

Politician (1866–1935)

Sir Frederick Rice

Member of Parliament for Harwich
- In office 1924–1929
- Preceded by: Albert Hillary
- Succeeded by: John Pybus

Personal details
- Born: Frederick Gill Rice; 1866 England, United Kingdom
- Died: 30 June 1929 (aged 62–63)

Sir Frederick Gill Rice (1866 – 30 June 1929) was a Conservative MP for Harwich.

A building contractor, he was principal of Rice & Son, building contractors and of Foote, Milne & Co., engineers. He was knighted in 1921.

He stood for Harwich in 1923, won it from the Liberals in 1924, but stood down in 1929.
