= Sir John Jacob, 1st Baronet =

English politician

- 1st Baronet Jacob
- Predecessor: New creation
- Successor: Sir John Jacob, 2nd Baronet
- Known for: Creation of the Jacob baronetcy
- Died: 1666; England
- Occupation: Landowner, politician

Sir John Jacob, 1st Baronet of Bromley (c. 1597–1666), was an English politician who sat in the House of Commons in 1640 and 1641. He supported the Royalist side in the English Civil War.

== Biography ==
Jacob was the son of Abraham Jacob of Gamlingay, Cambridgeshire and his wife Mary Rogers daughter of Francis Rogers of Dartford. He matriculated at Merton College, Oxford on 17 January 1617, aged 19 and was awarded BA on 6 February 1617. He became a customs farmer in the Port of London . He was knighted on 8 May 1633 and in 1634 purchased an estate at Bromley St Leonards.

In April 1640, Jacob was elected Member of Parliament for Harwich in the Short Parliament. He was elected MP for Rye for the Long Parliament in November 1640. However he was expelled in 1641 as a tobacco monopolist. He supported the Royalist cause and his lands were sequestered.

On the restoration he regained his office and was created a baronet of Bromley in the County of Middlesex on 11 January 1665.

Jacob died aged about 69 and was buried on 13 March 1666 at Bromley. He built almshouses at Gaminglay and left money to the parish to support them.

Jacob married firstly Elizabeth Halliday, daughter of John Halliday and granddaughter of Sir Leonard Holliday. They had two sons who died before him, and a daughter Susanna who married Sir Richard Wingfield Bt. He married secondly Alice Eaglesfield, widow of John Eaglesfield of London and daughter of Thomas Clowes of London and their son John succeeded in the baronetcy. He married thirdly Elizabeth Ashburnham, daughter of Sir John Ashburnham.

Parliament of England
Parliament suspended since 1629	Member of Parliament for Harwich; 1640; With: Sir Thomas Cheek	Succeeded by Sir Harbottle Grimston, 1st Baronet; Sir Thomas Cheek
Preceded by Sir John Colepeper; John White	Member of Parliament for Rye; 1640–1641; With: John White	Succeeded by William Hay; John White
Baronetage of England
New creation	Baronet (of Bromley); 1665–1666	Succeeded by John Jacob
