= Capel Luckyn =

17th-century English politician

Sir Capel Luckyn, 2nd Baronet (8 May 1622 – 23 January 1680) of Messing Hall, Essex was an English politician who sat in the House of Commons at various times between 1647 and 1679.

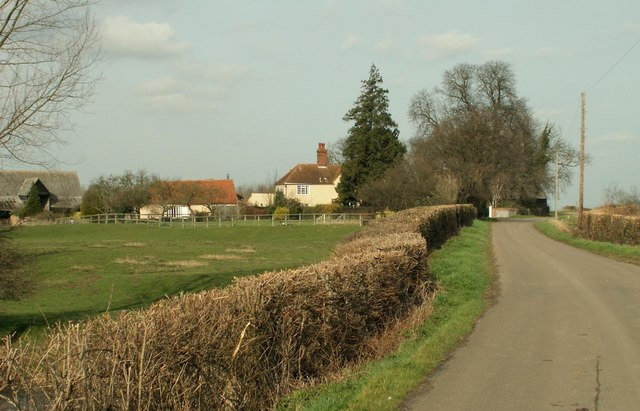
The site of Messing Hall - now Messing Lodge, Messing, Essex

Luckyn was the son of Sir William Luckyn, 1st Baronet and his wife Mildred Capel, daughter of Sir Gamaliel Capel of Rookwood Hall, Essex. He was educated at Bishop's Stortford and Caius College, Cambridge.

In 1647, Luckyn was elected Member of Parliament for Harwich in the Long Parliament. He acquired Messing Hall, his future residence, in 1650.

Luckyn inherited the baronetcy on the death of his father in 1660. He was elected MP for Harwich in the Convention Parliament of 1660. He was re-elected MP for Harwich in 1664 to the Cavalier Parliament and sat until 1679.

Luckyn died at the age of 57. He had married Mary Grimston, daughter of Sir Harbottle Grimston, 2nd Baronet. Their son William succeeded to the baronetcy.

Parliament of England
| Preceded by Sir Thomas Cheek; Sir Harbottle Grimston, 1st Baronet | Member of Parliament for Harwich; 1647–1653; With: Sir Thomas Cheek | Succeeded by Not represented in the Barebones parliament |
| Preceded by Not represented in Restored Rump | Member of Parliament for Harwich; 1660 (Apr); With: Sir Henry Wright, 1st Baronet | Succeeded by Sir Henry Wright, 1st Baronet; Thomas King |
| Preceded by Sir Henry Wright, 1st Baronet; Thomas King | Member of Parliament for Harwich; 1664–1679; With: Thomas King | Succeeded by Sir Anthony Dean; Samuel Pepys |
Baronetage of England
| Preceded by William Luckyn | Baronet (of Little Waltham); 1660–1680 | Succeeded by William Luckyn |
