= Harwich (constituency) =

Parliamentary constituency in the United Kingdom, 1604–2010

Coordinates: 51.86°N 1.24°E

- Former county constituency for the House of Commons
- Boundary of Harwich in Essex in 2005

- Location of Essex within England
- County: Essex

1885–2010
- Seats: One
- Created from: Harwich (parliamentary borough), East Essex
- Replaced by: Clacton (Majority), Harwich and North Essex (Part)

1604–1885
- Seats: Two to 1868, one from 1868 to 1885
- Type of constituency: Borough constituency
- Replaced by: Harwich (county constituency)

Harwich (/ˈhærɪtʃ/) was a constituency represented in the House of Commons of the UK Parliament from 1604 until its abolition for the 2010 general election.

== History ==
The Parliamentary Borough of Harwich had sent two members to the Parliament of England since it was founded in 1604 until 1707, then to the Parliament of Great Britain from 1707 to 1800 and to the Parliament of the United Kingdom from 1801. Under the Reform Act 1867 its representation was reduced to one, and in 1885 the parliamentary borough was abolished and replaced with a division of the County of Essex (later a county constituency) under the Redistribution of Seats Act 1885. For a long period of time it was known as a "Treasury borough" due to the control the Treasury had over its elections.

The constituency was abolished for the 2010 general election by the Fifth periodic review of Westminster constituencies, being succeeded by the new constituency of Clacton and part of the new constituency of Harwich and North Essex.

== Boundaries and boundary changes ==
=== 1885–1918 ===
- The Municipal Borough of Harwich; and
- Parts of the Sessional Divisions of Lexden and Winstree.

Non-resident freeholders of the Parliamentary Borough of Colchester, which constituted the Municipal Borough thereof, were also entitled to vote.

Formally known as the North Eastern or Harwich Division of Essex, incorporating the abolished Parliamentary Borough of Harwich and extending southwards and westwards to include the towns of Clacton and Brightlingsea and the rural areas surrounding Colchester.

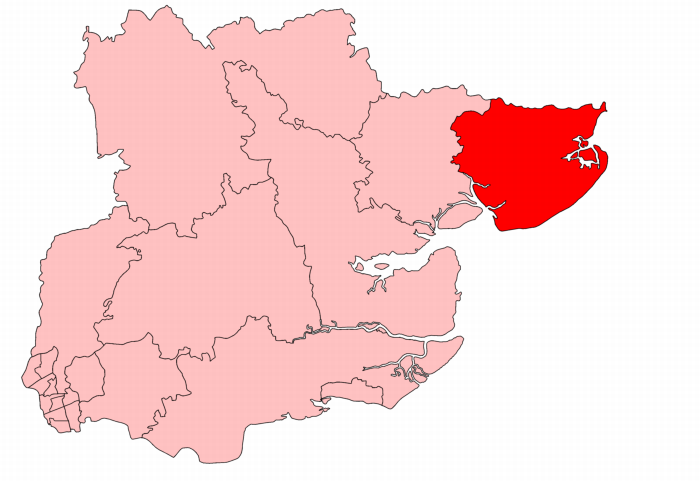
Harwich in Essex, 1918-83

=== 1918–1950 ===
- The Municipal Borough of Harwich;
- The Urban Districts of Brightlingsea, Clacton, Frinton-on-Sea, Walton-on-the-Naze, and Wivenhoe; and
- The Rural District of Tendring.

Western, rural areas now included in the new Colchester Division of Essex.

=== 1950–1983 ===
- The Municipal Borough of Harwich;
- The Urban Districts of Brightlingsea, Clacton, Frinton and Walton, and Wivenhoe; and
- The Rural District of Tendring.

No changes. (The Urban Districts of Frinton-on-Sea and Walton-on-the-Naze had been merged).

=== 1983–1997 ===
- The District of Tendring wards of Beaumont and Thorpe, Bockings Elm, Bradfield Wrabness and Wix, Frinton, Golf Green, Great and Little Oakley, Harwich East, Harwich East Central, Harwich West, Harwich West Central, Haven, Holland and Kirby, Little Clacton, Ramsey, Rush Green, Southcliff, St Bartholomew's, St James, St John's, St Mary's, St Osyth, Tendring and Weeley, and Walton.

Western parts, including Brightlingsea and Wivenhoe, included in the new constituency of North Colchester.

=== 1997–2010 ===
- The District of Tendring wards of Beaumont and Thorpe, Bockings Elm, Frinton, Golf Green, Great and Little Oakley, Harwich East, Harwich East Central, Harwich West, Harwich West Central, Haven, Holland and Kirby, Little Clacton, Ramsey, Rush Green, St Bartholomew's, St James, St John's, St Mary's, Southcliff, and Walton.

A further western slice, including St Osyth, added to the new constituency of North Essex (which had largely succeeded North Colchester).

Following the Boundary Commission's Fifth periodic review of Westminster constituencies, Parliament radically altered some constituencies and created new ones to allow for changes in population. Consequently, the constituency of Harwich was abolished. The majority of the constituency, including Clacton, Frinton and Walton, formed the new constituency of Clacton, and Harwich and surrounding areas were included in the new constituency of Harwich and North Essex.

== Members of Parliament ==
Constituency founded 1604

=== 1604 to 1660 ===
Parliament	First member	Second member
1604	Richard Browne	Thomas Trevor
1605	John Panton	Thomas Trevor
1614	Sir Harbottle Grimston	Sir Robert Mansell
1614 (Apr)	Sir Harbottle Grimston	Sir Charles Montagu
1620	Sir Thomas Cheek	Edward Grimston
1624	Sir Nathaniel Rich	Christopher Herrys
1625	Sir Edmund Sawyer	Christopher Herrys
1626	Sir Nathaniel Rich	Christopher Herrys
1628–1629	Sir Nathaniel Rich	Christopher Herrys
1629–1640	No Parliaments convened	
1640 (Apr)	Sir Thomas Cheek	Sir John Jacob, 1st Baronet
1640 (Nov)	Sir Harbottle Grimston, 1st Baronet	Sir Thomas Cheek
1645	Sir Harbottle Grimston, 1st Baronet, died replaced 1647 by Harbottle Grimston, 2nd Baronet who was secluded Dec 1648 in Pride's Purge	Sir Thomas Cheek
1648	Sir Thomas Cheek	Capel Luckyn
1653	Harwich not represented in Barebone's Parliament	
1654	Harwich not represented in First Protectorate Parliament	
1656	Harwich not represented in Second Protectorate Parliament	
1659	John Sicklemore	Thomas King

=== 1660–1868 ===
Year	First member	First party	Second member	Second party
1660	Sir Capel Luckyn, Bt		Sir Henry Wright, Bt	
1661	Thomas King		Sir Henry Wright, Bt	
1664	Thomas King		Sir Capel Luckyn, Bt	
February 1679	Sir Anthony Dean		Samuel Pepys	
August 1679	Sir Philip Parker, Bt		Sir Thomas Middleton	
1685	Sir Anthony Dean		Samuel Pepys	
1689	Sir Thomas Middleton		John Eldred	
1690	Sir Thomas Middleton		The Viscount Newhaven	
1695	Sir Thomas Middleton		Sir Thomas Davall	
1698	Samuel Atkinson		Sir Thomas Davall	
1699	Sir Thomas Middleton		Sir Thomas Davall	
1701	Dennis Lydell		Sir Thomas Davall	
1702	John Ellis		Sir Thomas Davall	
May 1708	Sir John Leake		Thomas Frankland	
December 1708	Kenrick Edisbury		Thomas Frankland	
1713	Carew Hervey Mildmay		Sir Thomas Davall	
May 1714	Carew Hervey Mildmay		Thomas Heath	
June 1714	Carew Hervey Mildmay		Benedict Calvert	
1715	Sir Philip Parker-a-Morley-Long, Bt		Thomas Heath	
1722	Sir Philip Parker-a-Morley-Long, Bt		Humphrey Parsons	
1727	Sir Philip Parker-a-Morley-Long, Bt		John Perceval	
1734	Carteret Leathes		Charles Stanhope	
1741	John Phillipson		Hill Mussenden	
1747	John Phillipson		Edward Coke	
1753	John Phillipson		Wenman Coke	
1756	William Ponsonby		Wenman Coke	
1758	Thomas Sewell		Wenman Coke	
1761	Charles Townshend		John Roberts	
1767	Thomas Bradshaw		John Roberts	
1768	Edward Harvey		John Roberts	
1772	Edward Harvey		Charles Jenkinson	
1774	Edward Harvey		John Robinson	
1778	George North		John Robinson	
1784	Thomas Orde	Tory	John Robinson	
1796	Richard Hopkins		John Robinson	
1799	Henry Dillon-Lee		John Robinson	
1802	Thomas Myers		John Robinson	
January 1803	Thomas Myers		John Hiley Addington	Tory
April 1803	James Adams		John Hiley Addington	Tory
1806	William Fremantle	Tory	John Hiley Addington	Tory
March 1807	James Adams		John Hiley Addington	Tory
May 1807	William Huskisson	Tory	John Hiley Addington	Tory
1812	Nicholas Vansittart	Tory	John Hiley Addington	Tory
1818	Nicholas Vansittart	Tory	Charles Bathurst	Tory
1823	George Canning	Tory	John Charles Herries	Tory
1826	Nicholas Conyngham Tindal	Tory	John Charles Herries	Tory
1827	Sir William Rae, Bt	Tory	John Charles Herries	Tory
1830	George Robert Dawson	Tory	John Charles Herries	Tory
1832	Christopher Thomas Tower	Whig	John Charles Herries	Tory
1834	Christopher Thomas Tower	Whig	John Charles Herries	Conservative
1835	Francis Robert Bonham	Conservative	John Charles Herries	Conservative
1837	Alexander Ellice	Whig	John Charles Herries	Conservative
1841	John Attwood	Conservative	William Beresford	Conservative
1847	John Attwood	Peelite	John Bagshaw	Whig
1848 by-election	Sir John Hobhouse, Bt	Radical	John Bagshaw	Whig
March 1851 by-election	Henry Thoby Prinsep	Conservative	John Bagshaw	Whig
May 1851 by-election	Robert Wigram Crawford	Whig	John Bagshaw	Whig
July 1851	Writ suspended		John Bagshaw	Whig
April 1852 by-election	Sir Fitzroy Kelly	Conservative	John Bagshaw	Whig
May 1852 by-election	Isaac Butt	Conservative	John Bagshaw	Whig
July 1852	George Peacocke	Conservative	David Waddington	Conservative
1853 by-election	John Bagshaw	Whig	David Waddington	Conservative
March 1857	John Bagshaw	Whig	George Drought Warburton	Independent Whig
December 1857 by-election	John Bagshaw	Whig	Robert John Bagshaw	Whig
March 1859 by-election	Henry Jervis-White-Jervis	Conservative	Robert John Bagshaw	Whig
May 1859	Henry Jervis-White-Jervis	Conservative	Hon. William Campbell	Liberal
1860 by-election	Henry Jervis-White-Jervis	Conservative	Richard Rowley	Conservative
1865	Henry Jervis-White-Jervis	Conservative	John Kelk	Conservative
1868	Constituency reduced to one member			

=== 1868–2010 ===
Election	Member	Party
1868	Representation reduced to one member	
1868	Henry Jervis-White-Jervis	Conservative
1880	Henry Tyler	Conservative
1885	James Round	Conservative
1906	Arthur Lever	Liberal
1910	Harry Newton	Conservative
1922	Albert Hillary	Liberal
1924	Sir Frederick Rice	Conservative
1929	Sir John Pybus	Liberal
1931	Sir John Pybus	Liberal National
1935	Sir Stanley Holmes	Liberal National
1954 by-election	Julian Ridsdale	National Liberal
1968	Julian Ridsdale	Conservative
1992	Iain Sproat	Conservative
1997	Ivan Henderson	Labour
2005	Douglas Carswell	Conservative
2010	Constituency abolished: see Clacton and Harwich and North Essex	

== Elections ==
=== Elections in the 1830s ===
Herries was appointed Secretary at War, requiring a by-election.

By-election, 10 February 1830: Harwich
Party	Candidate	Votes	%
Tory	John Charles Herries	Unopposed	
Registered electors		32	
Tory hold			

1830 general election: Harwich
Party	Candidate	Votes	%
Tory	John Charles Herries	Unopposed	
Tory	George Robert Dawson	Unopposed	
Registered electors		32	
Tory hold			
Tory hold			

1831 general election: Harwich
Party	Candidate	Votes	%
Tory	John Charles Herries	Unopposed	
Tory	George Robert Dawson	Unopposed	
Registered electors		32	
Tory hold			
Tory hold			

1832 general election: Harwich
Party	Candidate	Votes	%
Tory	John Charles Herries	97	26.3
Whig	Christopher Thomas Tower	93	25.2
Tory	Nicholas Leader	90	24.4
Whig	John Disney	89	24.1
Turnout		186	86.9
Registered electors		214	
Majority		4	1.1
Tory hold			
Majority		3	0.8
Whig gain from Tory			

1835 general election: Harwich
Party	Candidate	Votes	%	±%
Conservative	John Charles Herries	97	46.2	+19.9
Conservative	Francis Robert Bonham	78	37.1	+12.7
Whig	Robert Norris Verner	35	16.7	−32.6
Majority		43	20.4	N/A
Turnout		123	78.8	−8.1
Registered electors		156		
Conservative hold		Swing	+18.1	
Conservative gain from Whig		Swing	+14.5	

1837 general election: Harwich
Party	Candidate	Votes	%	±%
Conservative	John Charles Herries	75	25.9	−20.3
Whig	Alexander Ellice	75	25.9	+17.6
Whig	Christopher Thomas Tower	74	25.5	+17.2
Conservative	Francis Robert Bonham	66	22.8	−14.3
Turnout		146	90.1	+11.3
Registered electors		162		
Majority		0	0.0	−20.4
Conservative hold		Swing	−18.9	
Majority		9	3.1	N/A
Whig gain from Conservative		Swing	+17.5	

=== Elections in the 1840s ===
1841 general election: Harwich
Party	Candidate	Votes	%	±%
Conservative	John Attwood	94	27.2	+1.3
Conservative	William Beresford	94	27.2	+4.4
Whig	John Bagshaw	84	24.3	−1.6
Whig	Denis Le Marchant	73	21.2	−4.3
Majority		10	2.9	+2.9
Turnout		174	93.5	+3.4
Registered electors		186		
Conservative hold		Swing	+2.1	
Conservative gain from Whig		Swing	+3.7	

1847 general election: Harwich
Party	Candidate	Votes	%	±%
Whig	John Bagshaw	213	45.9	+0.4
Peelite	John Attwood	184	39.7	+12.5
Conservative	William Knight	65	14.0	−13.2
Conservative	Dudley St Leger Hill	2	0.4	−26.8
Turnout		232 (est)	78.6 (est)	−14.9
Registered electors		295		
Majority		148	31.9	N/A
Whig gain from Conservative		Swing	+10.2	
Majority		182	39.3	N/A
Peelite gain from Conservative		Swing	+16.3	

Attwood's election was declared void on petition due to bribery by his agents, causing a by-election.

By-election, 1 April 1848: Harwich
Party	Candidate	Votes	%	±%
Radical	John Hobhouse	131	50.8	N/A
Conservative	John Manners-Sutton	127	49.2	+34.8
Majority		4	1.6	N/A
Turnout		258	87.8	+10.2
Registered electors		294		
Radical gain from Peelite		Swing		

=== Elections in the 1850s ===
Hobhouse was elevated to the peerage, becoming 1st Baron Broughton and causing a by-election.

By-election, 5 March 1851: Harwich
Party	Candidate	Votes	%	±%
Conservative	Henry Thoby Prinsep	135	50.9	+36.5
Whig	Robert Wigram Crawford	130	49.1	+3.2
Majority		5	1.8	N/A
Turnout		265	91.7	+13.1
Registered electors		289		
Conservative gain from Radical		Swing	+16.7	

Prinsep's election was declared void on petition due to bribery, causing a by-election.

By-election, 28 May 1851: Harwich
Party	Candidate	Votes	%	±%
Whig	Robert Wigram Crawford	133	51.2	+5.3
Conservative	Henry Thoby Prinsep	127	48.8	+34.4
Majority		6	2.4	N/A
Turnout		260	90.0	+11.4
Registered electors		289		
Whig gain from Conservative		Swing	−14.6	

Crawford's election was declared void, due to polling being closed prematurely, and the seat's writ was suspended in July 1851. A by-election was called the next year.

By-election, 10 April 1852: Harwich
Party	Candidate	Votes	%	±%
Conservative	Fitzroy Kelly	Unopposed		
Conservative gain from Whig				

Kelly resigned to contest a by-election in East Suffolk, causing a by-election.

By-election, 8 May 1852: Harwich
Party	Candidate	Votes	%	±%
Conservative	Isaac Butt	Unopposed		
Conservative hold				

1852 general election: Harwich
Party	Candidate	Votes	%	±%
Conservative	George Peacocke	135	26.8	+12.8
Conservative	David Waddington	134	26.6	+26.2
Whig	John Bagshaw	125	24.8	−21.1
Independent Whig	George Drought Warburton	110	21.8	New
Majority		9	1.8	N/A
Turnout		252 (est)	92.6 (est)	+14.0
Registered electors		272		
Conservative gain from Peelite		Swing	+11.7	
Conservative gain from Whig		Swing	+18.4	

Peacocke's election was declared void on petition, due to corrupt practices, causing a by-election.

By-election, 21 June 1853: Harwich
Party	Candidate	Votes	%	±%
Whig	John Bagshaw	140	54.9	+30.1
Conservative	William Fraser	115	45.1	−8.3
Majority		25	9.8	N/A
Turnout		255	85.3	−7.3
Registered electors		299		
Whig gain from Conservative		Swing	+19.2	

1857 general election: Harwich
Party	Candidate	Votes	%	±%
Whig	John Bagshaw	173	32.6	+7.8
Independent Whig	George Drought Warburton	147	27.7	+5.9
Conservative	Henry Jervis-White-Jervis	113	21.3	−5.5
Conservative	Benjamin Buck Greene	98	18.5	−8.1
Turnout		266 (est)	84.8 (est)	−7.8
Registered electors		313		
Majority		60	11.3	N/A
Whig gain from Conservative		Swing	+7.3	
Majority		49	9.2	N/A
Independent Whig gain from Conservative		Swing	+6.4	

Warburton's death caused a by-election.

By-election, 9 December 1857: Harwich
Party	Candidate	Votes	%	±%
Whig	Robert John Bagshaw	162	70.1	+37.5
Independent Whig	Andrew Arcedeckne	69	29.9	+2.2
Majority		93	40.2	N/A
Turnout		231	73.8	−11.0
Registered electors		313		
Whig gain from Independent Whig				

Bagshaw's resignation caused a by-election.

By-election, 18 March 1859: Harwich
Party	Candidate	Votes	%	±%
Conservative	Henry Jervis-White-Jervis	145	52.0	+12.2
Whig	William Campbell	134	48.0	+15.4
Majority		11	4.0	N/A
Turnout		279	83.5	−1.3
Registered electors		334		
Conservative gain from Whig		Swing	−1.6	

1859 general election: Harwich
Party	Candidate	Votes	%	±%
Conservative	Henry Jervis-White-Jervis	156	25.7	+4.4
Liberal	William Campbell	155	25.5	−7.1
Conservative	Richard Rowley	152	25.0	+6.5
Liberal	John Clark Marshman	144	23.7	−4.0
Turnout		304 (est)	90.9 (est)	+6.1
Registered electors		334		
Majority		12	2.0	N/A
Conservative gain from Independent Whig		Swing	N/A	
Majority		3	0.5	−4.4
Liberal hold		Swing	−6.3	

=== Elections in the 1860s ===
Campbell succeeded to the peerage, becoming Lord Stratheden and Campbell, and causing a by-election.

By-election, 24 April 1860: Harwich
Party	Candidate	Votes	%	±%
Conservative	Richard Rowley	146	55.7	+5.0
Liberal	Stuart Donaldson	116	44.3	−4.9
Majority		30	11.4	+9.2
Turnout		262	82.6	−8.3
Registered electors		317		
Conservative hold		Swing	+5.0	

General election 1865: Harwich
Party	Candidate	Votes	%	±%
Conservative	Henry Jervis-White-Jervis	209	35.0	+9.3
Conservative	John Kelk	194	32.5	+7.5
Liberal	Michael Wills	117	19.6	−5.9
Liberal	James Fitzjames Stephen	77	12.9	−10.8
Majority		77	12.9	N/A
Turnout		299 (est)	77.3 (est)	−13.6
Registered electors		386		
Conservative hold		Swing	+8.8	
Conservative gain from Liberal		Swing	+7.9	

Seat reduced to one member

General election 1868: Harwich
Party	Candidate	Votes	%	±%
Conservative	Henry Jervis-White-Jervis	328	69.9	−2.4
Liberal	David James Jenkins	141	30.1	−2.4
Majority		187	39.8	+26.9
Turnout		469	75.4	−1.9
Registered electors		622		
Conservative hold		Swing	+2.4	

=== Elections in the 1870s ===
General election 1874: Harwich
Party	Candidate	Votes	%	±%
Conservative	Henry Jervis-White-Jervis	Unopposed		
Registered electors		712		
Conservative hold				

=== Elections in the 1880s ===
General election 1880: Harwich
Party	Candidate	Votes	%	±%
Conservative	Henry Tyler	368	54.3	N/A
Liberal	George Tomline	310	45.7	New
Majority		58	8.6	N/A
Turnout		678	89.3	N/A
Registered electors		759		
Conservative hold		Swing		

General election 1885: Harwich
Party	Candidate	Votes	%	±%
Conservative	James Round	4,584	54.5	+0.2
Liberal	James Jackson	3,824	45.5	−0.2
Majority		760	9.0	+0.4
Turnout		8,408	82.9	−6.4
Registered electors		10,141		
Conservative hold		Swing	+0.2	

General election 1886: Harwich
Party	Candidate	Votes	%	±%
Conservative	James Round	4,623	66.6	+12.1
Liberal	James Wicks	2,322	33.4	−12.1
Majority		2,301	33.2	+24.2
Turnout		6,945	68.5	−14.4
Registered electors		10,141		
Conservative hold		Swing	+12.1	

=== Elections in the 1890s ===
Round

General election 1892: Harwich
Party	Candidate	Votes	%	±%
Conservative	James Round	4,113	51.9	−14.7
Liberal	Robert Varty	3,808	48.1	+14.7
Majority		305	3.8	−29.4
Turnout		7,921	72.5	+4.0
Registered electors		10,924		
Conservative hold		Swing	−14.7	

General election 1895: Harwich
Party	Candidate	Votes	%	±%
Conservative	James Round	4,566	63.0	+11.1
Liberal	Robert Varty	2,685	37.0	−11.1
Majority		1,881	26.0	+22.2
Turnout		7,251	64.2	−8.3
Registered electors		11,296		
Conservative hold		Swing	+11.1	

=== Elections in the 1900s ===
General election 1900: Harwich
Party	Candidate	Votes	%	±%
Conservative	James Round	Unopposed		
Conservative hold				

Lever

General election 1906: Harwich
Party	Candidate	Votes	%	±%
Liberal	Arthur Lever	5,650	51.6	New
Conservative	Harry Newton	5,308	48.4	N/A
Majority		342	3.2	N/A
Turnout		10,958	83.4	N/A
Registered electors		13,144		
Liberal gain from Conservative		Swing	N/A	

=== Elections in the 1910s ===
General election January 1910: Harwich
Party	Candidate	Votes	%	±%
Conservative	Harry Newton	6,757	54.6	+3.0
Liberal	Arthur Lever	5,608	45.4	−3.0
Majority		1,149	9.2	+6.0
Turnout		12,365	86.6	+3.2
Conservative gain from Liberal		Swing	+3.0	

General election December 1910: Harwich
Party	Candidate	Votes	%	±%
Conservative	Harry Newton	6,470	56.4	+1.8
Liberal	Frank Stapledon Hiley	5,008	43.6	−1.8
Majority		1,462	12.8	+3.6
Turnout		11,478	80.4	−6.2
Conservative hold		Swing	+1.8	

General Election 1914–15:

Another General Election was required to take place before the end of 1915. The political parties had been making preparations for an election to take place and by July 1914, the following candidates had been selected;

- Unionist: Harry Newton
- Liberal: Edward Aylmer Digby

Aylmer Digby

General election 1918: Harwich
Party		Candidate	Votes	%	±%
C	Unionist	Harry Newton	8,261	53.9	−2.5
	Liberal	Edward Aylmer Digby	7,064	46.1	+2.5
Majority			1,197	7.8	−5.0
Turnout			15,325	55.9	−26.5
Registered electors			27,421		
	Unionist hold		Swing	−2.5	
C indicates candidate endorsed by the coalition government.

=== Elections in the 1920s ===
General election 1922: Harwich
Party	Candidate	Votes	%	±%
Liberal	Albert Hillary	10,556	51.9	+5.8
Unionist	Geoffrey St John Strutt	9,792	48.1	−5.8
Majority		764	3.8	N/A
Turnout		20,348	71.6	+15.7
Registered electors		28,432		
Liberal gain from Unionist		Swing	+5.8	

General election 1923: Harwich
Party	Candidate	Votes	%	±%
Liberal	Albert Hillary	12,059	54.3	+2.4
Unionist	Frederick Rice	10,142	45.7	−2.4
Majority		1,917	8.6	+4.8
Turnout		22,201	76.2	+4.6
Registered electors		29,126		
Liberal hold		Swing	+2.4	

General election 1924: Harwich
Party	Candidate	Votes	%	±%
Unionist	Frederick Rice	12,219	51.5	+5.8
Liberal	Albert Hillary	9,904	41.7	−12.6
Labour	Alfred Barton	1,604	6.8	New
Majority		2,315	9.8	N/A
Turnout		23,727	79.0	+2.8
Registered electors		30,047		
Unionist gain from Liberal		Swing	+9.2	

General election 1929: Harwich
Party	Candidate	Votes	%	±%
Liberal	John Pybus	16,309	52.8	+11.1
Unionist	John Mayhew	13,609	44.1	−7.4
Ind. Unionist	J Elliott	948	3.1	New
Majority		2,700	8.7	N/A
Turnout		30,866	76.3	−2.7
Registered electors		40,478		
Liberal gain from Unionist		Swing	+9.3	

=== Elections in the 1930s ===
General election 1931: Harwich
Party	Candidate	Votes	%	±%
National Liberal	John Pybus	26,818	86.4	+33.6
Labour	E L McKeag	4,229	13.6	New
Majority		22,589	72.8	+64.1
Turnout		31,047	72.6	−3.7
National Liberal hold		Swing		

General election 1935: Harwich
Party	Candidate	Votes	%	±%
National Liberal	Stanley Holmes	21,716	70.3	−16.1
Labour	Ambrose Appelbe	9,170	29.7	+16.1
Majority		12,546	40.6	−32.2
Turnout		30,886	63.9	−8.7
National Liberal hold		Swing	−16.1	

=== Elections in the 1940s ===
General Election 1939–40: Another General Election was required to take place before the end of 1940. The political parties had been making preparations for an election to take place from 1939 and by the end of this year, the following candidates had been selected;

- Liberal National: Stanley Holmes
- Labour: Ald. Joseph Hewitt

General election 1945: Harwich
Party	Candidate	Votes	%	±%
National Liberal	Stanley Holmes	16,452	55.7	−14.6
Labour	Joseph Hewitt	13,067	44.3	+14.6
Majority		3,385	11.4	−29.2
Turnout		29,519	68.8	+4.9
National Liberal hold		Swing	−14.6	

=== Elections in the 1950s ===
General election 1950: Harwich
Party	Candidate	Votes	%	±%
National Liberal	Stanley Holmes	22,814	50.6	−5.1
Labour	Morris Janis	16,756	37.1	−7.2
Liberal	Leonard Train	5,536	12.3	New
Majority		6,058	13.5	+2.1
Turnout		45,106	81.9	+13.1
National Liberal hold		Swing		

General election 1951: Harwich
Party	Candidate	Votes	%	±%
National Liberal (Conservative)	Stanley Holmes	26,169	58.9	+8.3
Labour	Morris Janis	18,244	41.1	+4.0
Majority		7,925	17.8	+4.3
Turnout		44,413	78.8	−3.1
National Liberal hold		Swing		

1954 Harwich by-election
Party	Candidate	Votes	%	±%
Conservative (National Liberal)	Julian Ridsdale	19,532	59.1	+0.2
Labour	Shirley Catlin	13,535	40.9	−0.2
Majority		5,997	18.2	+0.4
Turnout		33,067		
National Liberal hold		Swing		

General election 1955: Harwich
Party	Candidate	Votes	%	±%
Conservative (National Liberal)	Julian Ridsdale	23,889	56.4	−2.5
Labour	Shirley Catlin	14,425	34.1	−7.0
Liberal	Wolf Isaac Akst	4,010	9.5	New
Majority		9,464	22.3	+3.5
Turnout		42,234	75.6	−3.2
National Liberal hold		Swing		

General election 1959: Harwich
Party	Candidate	Votes	%	±%
Conservative (National Liberal)	Julian Ridsdale	23,653	53.2	−3.2
Labour	William Robinson	11,588	26.0	−7.1
Liberal	Thomas E Dale	5,507	12.4	+2.9
Independent	Leonard F Rose	3,744	8.4	New
Majority		12,065	27.2	+4.9
Turnout		44,492	76.4	+0.8
National Liberal hold		Swing		

=== Elections in the 1960s ===
General election 1964: Harwich
Party	Candidate	Votes	%	±%
Conservative (National Liberal)	Julian Ridsdale	25,102	50.4	−2.8
Labour	David Winnick	14,877	29.9	+3.9
Liberal	Thomas E Dale	9,824	19.7	+7.3
Majority		10,225	20.5	−6.7
Turnout		49,803	75.1	−1.3
National Liberal hold		Swing		

General election 1966: Harwich
Party	Candidate	Votes	%	±%
Conservative (National Liberal)	Julian Ridsdale	24,975	47.6	−2.8
Labour	Stephen R Hatch	18,335	34.9	+5.0
Liberal	Thomas E Dale	9,219	17.6	−2.1
Majority		6,640	12.7	−7.8
Turnout		52,529	74.4	−0.7
National Liberal hold		Swing	−3.9	

=== Elections in the 1970s ===
General election 1970: Harwich
Party	Candidate	Votes	%	±%
Conservative	Julian Ridsdale	32,754	53.5	+5.9
Labour	Andrew Phillips	19,923	32.6	−2.3
Liberal	Thomas E Dale	8,519	13.9	−3.7
Majority		12,831	20.9	+8.2
Turnout		61,196	74.5	+0.1
Conservative hold		Swing	+4.0	

General election February 1974: Harwich
Party	Candidate	Votes	%	±%
Conservative	Julian Ridsdale	32,452	45.6	−7.9
Liberal	D Cadman	19,989	28.1	+14.2
Labour	JB Fryer	18,697	26.3	−6.3
Majority		12,463	17.5	−3.4
Turnout		71,138	80.7	+6.2
Conservative hold		Swing	−11.1	

General election October 1974: Harwich
Party	Candidate	Votes	%	±%
Conservative	Julian Ridsdale	29,963	46.7	+1.1
Labour	JB Fryer	19,135	29.8	+3.5
Liberal	Thomas Kellock	15,048	23.5	−4.6
Majority		10,828	16.9	−0.6
Turnout		64,146	72.3	−8.4
Conservative hold		Swing	−1.2	

General election 1979: Harwich
Party	Candidate	Votes	%	±%
Conservative	Julian Ridsdale	37,685	54.3	+7.6
Labour	CW Brooks	16,998	24.5	−5.3
Liberal	Robert Goodenough	14,094	20.3	−3.2
National Front	A Pearson	597	0.9	New
Majority		20,687	29.8	+12.9
Turnout		69,374	74.7	+2.4
Conservative hold		Swing	+6.5	

1979 notional result
Party	Vote	%
Conservative	27,950	54.6
Labour	12,379	24.2
Liberal	10,387	20.3
Others	440	0.9
Turnout	51,156	
Electorate		

=== Elections in the 1980s ===
General election 1983: Harwich
Party	Candidate	Votes	%	±%
Conservative	Julian Ridsdale	27,422	54.1	−0.5
Liberal	Robert Goodenough	14,920	29.5	+9.2
Labour	Ralph Knight	8,302	16.4	−7.8
Majority		12,502	24.7	−5.8
Turnout		50,644	70.2	−4.5
Registered electors		72,179		
Conservative hold		Swing	−4.8	

General election 1987: Harwich
Party	Candidate	Votes	%	±%
Conservative	Julian Ridsdale	29,344	51.8	−2.3
Liberal	Liz Lynne	17,262	30.4	+1.0
Labour	Ralph Knight	9,920	17.5	+1.1
Independent	Christopher Humphrey	161	0.3	New
Majority		12,082	21.4	−3.4
Turnout		56,687	73.5	+3.3
Registered electors		77,149		
Conservative hold		Swing	−1.7	

=== Elections in the 1990s ===
General election 1992: Harwich
Party	Candidate	Votes	%	±%
Conservative	Iain Sproat	32,369	51.9	+0.1
Liberal Democrats	Pauline Bevan	15,210	24.4	−6.1
Labour	Ralph Knight	14,511	23.3	+5.8
Natural Law	Eileen McGrath	279	0.4	New
Majority		17,159	27.5	+6.2
Turnout		62,369	77.7	+4.2
Registered electors		80,260		
Conservative hold		Swing	+3.1	

1992 notional result
Party	Vote	%
Conservative	29,372	51.7
Labour	14,047	24.7
Liberal Democrats	13,187	23.2
Others	256	0.5
Turnout	56,862	76.1
Electorate	74,676	

General election 1997: Harwich
Party	Candidate	Votes	%	±%
Labour	Ivan Henderson	20,740	38.8	+14.1
Conservative	Iain Sproat	19,524	36.5	−15.2
Liberal Democrats	Ann Elvin	7,037	13.1	−10.0
Referendum	Jeffrey Titford	4,923	9.2	New
Independent	Ralph Knight	1,290	2.4	New
Majority		1,216	2.3	N/A
Turnout		53,514	70.6	−5.5
Registered electors		75,775		
Labour gain from Conservative		Swing	−14.6	

This was the Referendum Party's best result in the election.

=== Elections in the 2000s ===
General election 2001: Harwich
Party	Candidate	Votes	%	±%
Labour	Ivan Henderson	21,951	45.6	▲6.9
Conservative	Iain Sproat	19,355	40.2	▲3.7
Liberal Democrats	Peter Wilcock	4,099	8.5	▼4.6
UKIP	Tony Finnegan-Butler	2,463	5.1	New
Independent	Clive Lawrance	247	0.5	New
Majority		2,596	5.4	▲3.1
Turnout		48,115	62.1	▼8.6
Registered electors		77,539		
Labour hold		Swing	▲1.6	

General election 2005: Harwich
Party	Candidate	Votes	%	±%
Conservative	Douglas Carswell	21,235	42.1	▲1.9
Labour	Ivan Henderson	20,315	40.3	▼5.3
Liberal Democrats	Keith Tully	5,913	11.7	▲3.2
UKIP	Jeffrey Titford	2,314	4.6	▼0.5
Respect	John Tipple	477	0.9	New
Independent	Christopher Humphrey	154	0.3	New
Majority		920	1.8	N/A
Turnout		50,408	62.6	▲0.6
Registered electors		80,474		
Conservative gain from Labour		Swing	▼3.6	

== See also ==
- Parliamentary constituencies in Essex
