= Storekeeper of the Ordnance =

Former English military position (1597-1855)

Office of the Principal Storekeeper of the Ordnance
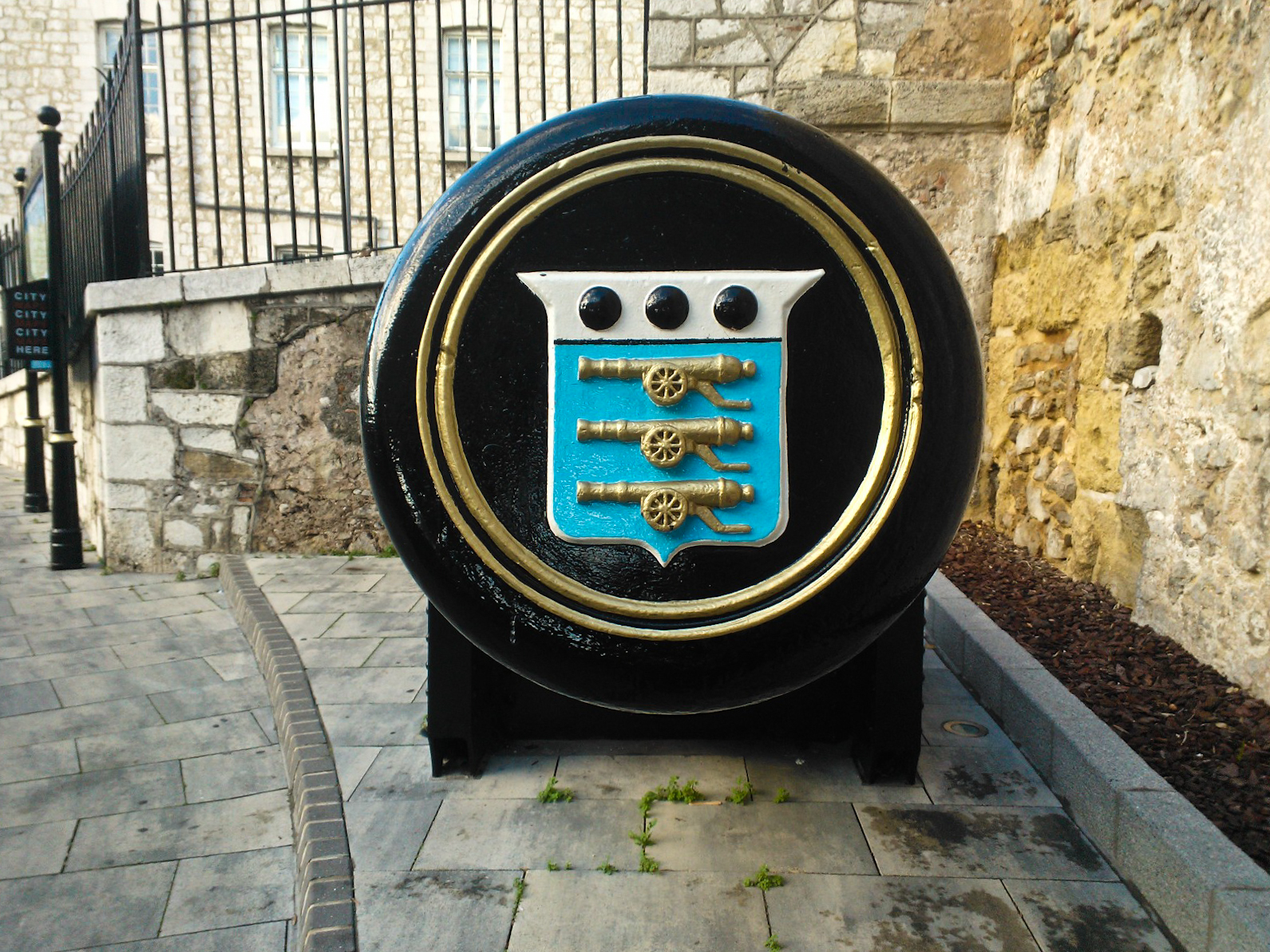
- Board of Ordnance Arms preserved on a gun tampion in Gibraltar
- Member of: Board of Ordnance (1597-1855)
- Reports to: Master-General of the Ordnance
- Appointer: Prime Minister; Subject to formal approval by the King-in-Council
- Term length: Not fixed (typically 3–9 years)
- Inaugural holder: John Leame
- Formation: 1558-1855

The Principal Storekeeper of the Ordnance was a subordinate of the Master-General of the Ordnance and a member of the English (and later British) Board of Ordnance from its constitution in 1597. He was responsible for the care and maintenance of ordnance stores. The office was abolished in 1855.

== Storekeepers of the Ordnance (pre-Restoration) ==
- bef. 1558: John Leame
- 12 February 1558: William Watson
- 3 February 1574: Richard Bowland
- 16 January 1589: Thomas Bedwell
- 15 November 1595: John Lee
- 22 December 1603: Sir Amyas Preston
- 16 July 1609: Sir Roger Ayscough
- 1 June 1612: Samuel Hales and John Hamond (joint)
- 2 June 1614: Nedtracey Smart and Shakerley Tracy (d. bef. 1620) (joint)
- 26 November 1620: Thomas Powell and John Gooding (joint)
- 19 June 1627: Thomas Powell (d. 1635) and Richard Marsh (joint)
- 2 January 1643: Richard Marsh and Thomas Withins (d. bef. 1649) (joint)

== Storekeepers of the Ordnance (Parliamentary) ==
- 1643: John Falkener

== Storekeepers of the Ordnance (post-Restoration) ==
- 1660 Richard Marsh (restored)
- 17 March 1672 George Marsh
- 1 December 1673 Edward Conyers
- 1 August 1683: William Bridges
- 2 April 1685: Thomas Gardiner
- 27 March 1691: William Meesters
- 15 February 1701: James Lowther
- 27 September 1708: Robert Lowther
- 26 April 1710: Edward Ashe
- 28 June 1712: Dixie Windsor
- 8 March 1717: Sir Thomas Wheate, 1st Baronet
- 9 March 1722: George Gregory
- 23 April 1746: Andrew Wilkinson
- 31 December 1762: Sir Edward Winnington, 1st Baronet
- 12 September 1765: Andrew Wilkinson
- 20 June 1778: Benjamin Langlois
- 16 October 1780: Henry Strachey
- 13 May 1782: John Clater Aldridge
- 18 April 1783: Henry Strachey
- 1 March 1784: John Clater Aldridge
- 1 July 1795: Mark Singleton
- 22 February 1806: John McMahon
- 7 April 1807: Mark Singleton
- 8 July 1829: Frederick Trench
- 13 January 1831: Henry Duncan
- 30 December 1834: Francis Robert Bonham
- 1 May 1835: George Anson
- 28 June 1841: James Hanway Plumridge
- 13 September 1841: Francis Robert Bonham
- 4 August 1845: Sir Thomas Hastings
