= Sir Harry Newton, 2nd Baronet =

British politician

Sir Harry Newton Bt

Member of Parliament for Harwich
- In office 10 February 1910 – 26 October 1922
- Preceded by: Arthur Lever
- Succeeded by: Albert Hillary

Personal details
- Born: 2 April 1875
- Died: 22 June 1951 (aged 76)
- Party: Conservative

Sir Harry Kottingham Newton, 2nd Baronet (2 April 1875 – 22 June 1951) was a British Conservative Party politician. He was elected member of parliament (MP) for Harwich in 1910, a seat he held until 1922.

Newton was educated at Rugby School and New College, Oxford. He served in the Second Boer War with a City volunteer regiment when his father was Lord Mayor. He was a Lieutenant of the City of London and a director of Harrods.

He died in June 1951, aged 76.

Parliament of the United Kingdom
Preceded by Arthur Lever	Member of Parliament for Harwich; 1910–1922	Succeeded by Albert Hillary
Baronetage of the United Kingdom
Preceded by Alfred Newton	Baronet (of The Wood and Kottingham House); 1921–1951	Succeeded by Harry Michael Rex Newton
