= Robert Bennet (surveyor) =

Sir Robert Bennet was an English surveyor and politician who sat in the House of Commons from 1621 to 1622.

Bennet was the grandson of Robert Bennet, Bishop of Hereford. He was surveyor of the works Windsor Castle. He was knighted at Greenwich on 11 June 1619. In 1621, Bennet was elected Member of Parliament for Windsor.

Parliament of England
Preceded by Sir Charles Howard; Samuel Backhouse	Member of Parliament for Windsor; 1621–1622; With: Sir Charles Howard	Succeeded by Edward Sayer; Thomas Woodward
