= HMS Excellent =

A ship and a shore establishment of the Royal Navy have borne the name HMS Excellent:

- HMS Excellent (1787) was a 74-gun third rate launched in 1787. She was converted into a 58-gun fourth rate in 1820 and became a gunnery training ship in 1830. She was broken up in 1835, but gave her name to the later gunnery school.
- HMS Excellent (shore establishment) is a shore establishment in Portsmouth. Originally housed in a number of hulks named HMS Excellent since 1830, it was formally established in 1869. It moved ashore in 1891 and remained active until 1985, when it ceased to be an independent command and was incorporated into HMS Nelson as part of HMNB Portsmouth. The name continues to exist in reference to the aspects under the site's administrative purview. A number of ships were renamed HMS Excellent whilst serving as homes or tenders of the establishment. These include:
- Base ships:
  - HMS Excellent was the original school ship between 1830 and 1835.
  - HMS Boyne was HMS Excellent between 1834 and 1859.
  - HMS Queen Charlotte was HMS Excellent between 1859 and 1892.
- Tenders and depot ships:
  - HMS Handy, a flat-iron gunboat, was HMS Excellent between 1891 and 1916.
  - HMS Drudge was HMS Excellent between 1916 and 1918.
  - William Leach was HMS Excellent between 1919 and 1920.
  - Andrew Jewer was HMS Excellent between 1922 and 1948.
  - Hainneville was HMS Excellent in 1942.
  - Harbour launch 3711 was HMS Excellent between 1945 and 1962.
