= Sir Harbottle Grimston, 1st Baronet =

English politician

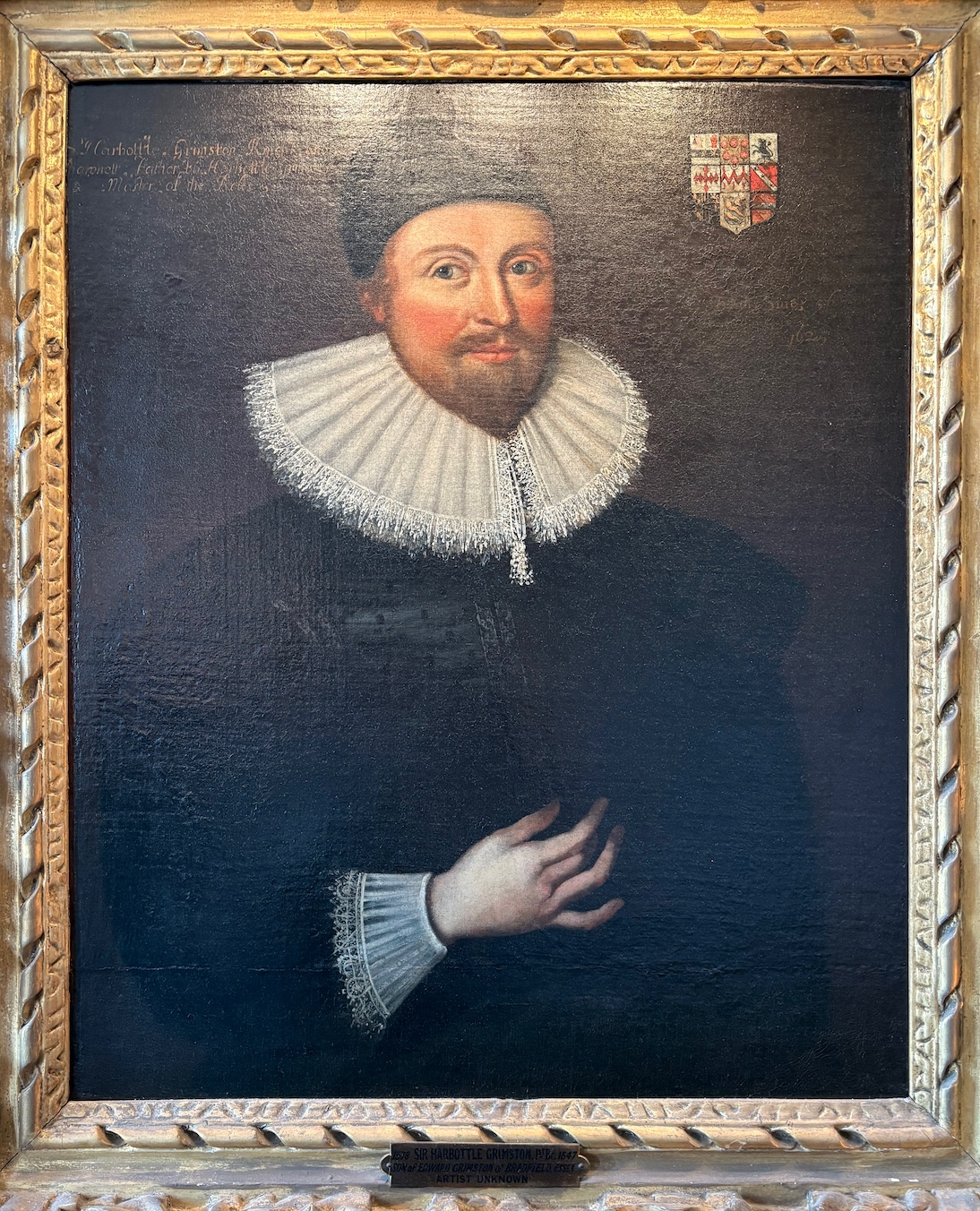
Sir Harbottle Grimston, 1st Baronet

Sir Harbottle Grimston, 1st Baronet (1578 – 1648) was an English politician who sat in the House of Commons variously between 1614 and 1648. He supported the Parliamentarian side in the English Civil War.

== Background ==
He was the son of Edward Grimston (d. 1610) of Rishangles, Suffolk, a master in Chancery and his wife Joan (d. 1604), daughter and heiress of Thomas Risby of Lavenham, Suffolk. He was the grandson of Edward Grimston, comptroller of Calais in the reign of Mary I. He owed his unusual personal name to his maternal grandfather John Harbottle (d. 1577) of Crowfield, Suffolk. His father's landed estate was significantly expanded through his marriage.

Grimston was raised as a Calvinist. He was admitted to Gray's Inn on 1 November 1594. By 1600 Grimston married Elizabeth (d. 1649), daughter of Ralph Coppinger of Stoke and Allhallows, Kent. Grimston's younger brother Henry married Elizabeth's sister Frances (d. 1608). Following the death of his wife's childless brother Ambrose in 1621, he became embroiled in a legal dispute with Elizabeth's stepmother over her claim to Ambrose's interest in their father's estate.

== Career ==
He inherited Bradfield Hall on the death of his father and became a Justice of the peace in Essex, also assuming control of a company of foot in the Essex militia. He was created Baronet of Bradfield in the County of Essex in the Baronetage of England on 25 November 1611 at a cost of £1,095. In 1614, he was appointed High Sheriff of Essex. He was elected Member of Parliament for the nearby borough of Harwich in 1614, possibly because of a movement to abolish baronetcies.

In 1626, Grimston was chosen as the junior knight of the shire (MP) for Essex, possibly because his performance as a deputy lieutenant had impressed Robert Rich, 2nd Earl of Warwick. Following the parliament his association with Warwick led to him being excluded from the deputy lieutenancy and his subsequent opposition to the "forced loan" demanded by the king led to his imprisonment. He was released on the grounds of ill health, but excluded from the bench. His opposition to the king's attempts to raise money independently of parliament increased his local popularity and he was re-elected for Essex in 1628. He was restored to the bench following the assassination of the Duke of Buckingham.

In April 1640 he sat again for Essex in the Short Parliament. In November 1640 he was elected MP for Harwich in the Long Parliament. He held the seat until his death.

He died in February 1648 and was buried at Bradfield.

== Family ==
Grimston and his wife Elizabeth Coppinger had 6 sons and 1 daughter, including:

- Edward (1600–1624).
- Harbottle succeeded his father.
- Elizabeth married Christopher, son of Sir William Harris of Shenfield, Essex.

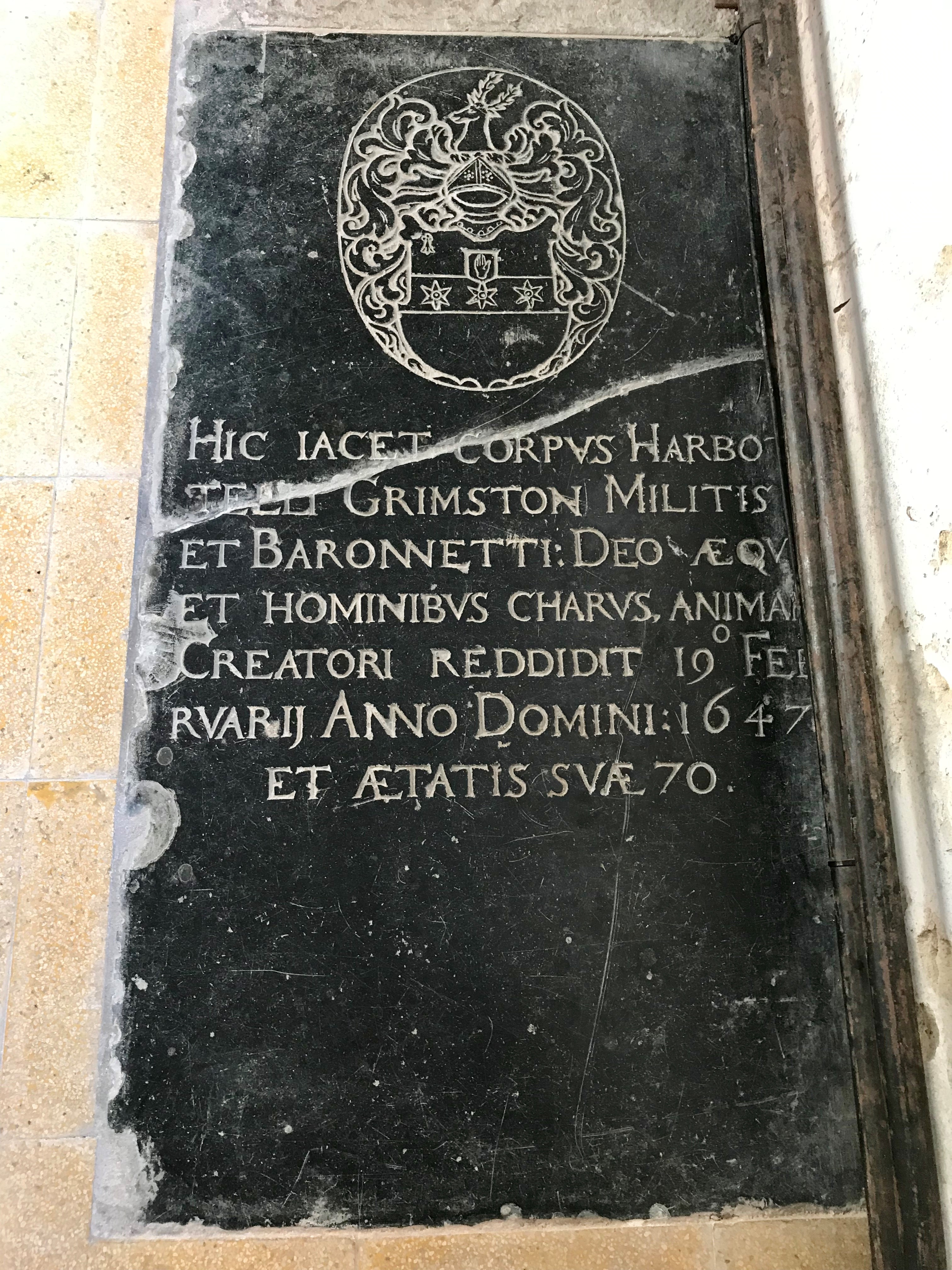
The grave of Sir Harbottle Grimston, Ist Baronet, in the chancel of St Lawrence's Church, Bradfield, Essex

Coat of arms of Sir Harbottle Grimston, 1st Baronet

Escutcheon
Argent on a fess Sable three mullets of six points Or pierced Gules in the dexter chief point an Ermine spot.

== See also ==
- List of baronetcies in the Baronetage of England
- List of extant baronetcies

Parliament of England
Preceded by Sir Francis Barrington, 1st Baronet; Sir Arthur Harris	Member of Parliament for Essex; 1626–1629; With: Sir Francis Barrington, 1st Baronet 1626–1628; Robert Rich, Lord Rich 1629	Parliament suspended until 1640
Parliament suspended since 1629	Member of Parliament for Essex; 1640; With: Sir Thomas Barrington, 2nd Baronet	Succeeded by Lord Rich; Sir William Masham, 1st Baronet
Preceded by Sir Thomas Cheek; Sir John Jacob, 1st Baronet	Member of Parliament for Harwich; 1640–1647; With: Sir Thomas Cheek	Succeeded by Capel Luckyn
Baronetage of England
New creation	Baronet (of Bradfield); 1611–1648	Succeeded by Harbottle Grimston
