= HMS Roebuck (1666) =

British warship

History

England
- Name: HMS Roebuck
- Builder: Royal Dockyard, Harwich
- Launched: 24 July 1666
- Commissioned: 10 July 1666
- Fate: Sold in December 1683

General characteristics
- Class & type: 16/14=gun, Sixth Rate
- Tons burthen: 129 42/94 bm
- Length: 64 ft 0 in (19.51 m) keel for tonnage
- Beam: 19 ft 6 in (5.94 m) for tonnage
- Draught: 8 ft 6 in (2.59 m)
- Depth of hold: 9 ft 10 in (3.00 m)
- Armament: as built; 16 × 6-pounder MLSB guns

HMS Roebuck was built by Anthony Deane during his tenure as the Master Shipwright at Harwich Dockyard under the 1665 Programme. She was commissioned before launch, she was at the Battle of Texel in 1673, saw service in the Mediterranean and finally service in the Channel. She was sold as useless in December 1683.

Roebuck was the fifth named vessel since it was used for a flyboat bought from the Dutch in January 1585, and was with Sir Walter Raleigh in North America.

== Design and specifications ==
Her construction dates little is known other than her launch date. She was launched at Harwich Dockyard on 24 July 1666. Her keel length reported for tonnage was 64 feet 0 inches (19.51 metres). Her breadth was 19 feet 6 inches (5.94 metres) as reported for tonnage with her depth of hold of 9 feet 10 inches (3.00 metres). Her draught was only 8 feet 6 inches (2.59 metres). Her tonnage was calculated as 129 42/94 tons.

Her armament was listed as fourteen to sixteen 6-pounder muzzle-loading smoothbore guns mounted on trucks.

== Commissioned service ==
She was commissioned on 10 July 1666 (prior to her launch date) under Captain George Liddle, RN. He remained her commander until his death on 14 August 1672. Captain Edward Pearse, RN was her commander from 20 January until 10 June 1673. On 12 June 1673 Captain Charles Lloyd, RN took command until 8 February 1874. She was at the Battle of Texel on 11 August 1873, though no reference to a battle honour can be found. On 9 February 1673 (Note: This date appears to be incorrect and the date should be 9 February 1674.) Captain Richard Country, RN took command until his death on 22 January 1676. She proceeded to the Mediterranean in 1674. Her last commander was Captain William Botham, RN who held this command from 10 April 1678 until 19 July 1679 while service in the Channel.

== Disposal ==
Roebuck was sold in December 1683.
