= Edward Grimston (Ipswich MP) =

English politician and comptroller of Calais

Edward Grimston (ca. 1508–1600), of Rishangles, Suffolk, was an English politician and comptroller of Calais.

He was a Member of Parliament (MP) for Ipswich in 1563, 1571 and 1572, Eye in 1589 and Orford in 1593.

== Early life ==
He was the son of Edward Grimston, by his wife Anne, daughter of John Garnish (Garneys) of Kenton, Suffolk. His grandfather was Edward Grimston (d. 19 March 1494), a son of the diplomat Edward Grimston (d. 1478), subject of the well-known portrait of 1446 by Petrus Christus (on long-term loan to the National Gallery from his descendant the Earl of Verulam), and his second wife Mary Drury. For a while he studied at Gonville Hall, Cambridge, but did not graduate. He was a commissioner in 1552 for the sale of church goods in Ipswich.

== The fall of Calais ==
On 28 August 1552 he was appointed comptroller of Calais and the marches, by a patent dated 16 April 1553. In 1557 he purchased from the crown the manor of Rishangles, Suffolk, subject to the life estate of Robert Chichester. He is said to have frequently warned his superiors about the condition of Calais. When it was taken by Francis, Duke of Guise on 7 January 1558 he was made a prisoner and sent to the Bastille in Paris. He lost an estate purchased about Calais, and his ransom was set high. On 2 July 1558 he, Thomas Wentworth, 2nd Baron Wentworth, and others were indicted in London for high treason for a private agreement with the king of the French to surrender Calais. In October 1559 he was still a prisoner in the Bastille. He was lodged at the top of the building, but, with a file and a rope, changed his clothes with his servant, and escaped. He cut his beard with a pair of scissors supplied by his servant, managed to pass for a Scot, and got to England about the middle of November. / Grimston surrendered himself to the indictment against him, and was confined, first in Sir John Mason's house, and then in the Tower of London. On 28 November a special commission was issued for his trial. He was arraigned at the Guildhall, London, on 1 December. The jury acquitted him, and he was forthwith discharged.

== Later life ==
In July 1560 Grimston was appointed muster-master of the army of the north, and by 6 August following had taken up his quarters at Berwick. Letters from him describing the bad state of the garrison are extant. The queen desired to recall him at Michaelmas, but he stayed on until the middle of November.

To the parliament which assembled on 11 January 1563 Grimston was returned for Ipswich. On 25 June 1565 he was a second time appointed to a post at Berwick. following. He was again returned for Ipswich to the parliaments which met on 2 April 1571 and on 8 May 1572.

Grimston died on 17 March 1599.

== Family ==
Grimston was twice married. His son, Edward Grimston, by his first wife, married Joan, daughter of Thomas Risby of Lavenham, Suffolk, and granddaughter of John Harbottle of Crossfield, and died in 1610. He was the grandfather of Sir Harbottle Grimston, 1st Baronet.
