= Thomas Davall (senior) =

English member of parliament (1644–1712)

Sir Thomas Davall (1644–1712), of Dovercourt, Essex, was an English member of parliament (MP).

He was a Member of the Parliament of England for Harwich 1695–1706.
