= Walter Dottyn =

English politician

Walter Dottyn (c. 1554–1635), of Totnes, Devon, was an English politician.

He was a member (MP) of the parliament of England for Totnes in 1604.
