= Christopher Thomas Tower =

English landowner

Christopher Thomas Tower (1775 – 19 February 1867) was an English landowner.

== Biography ==
The son of Christopher Tower of Weald Hall, Essex, and grandson of Christopher Tower MP, he succeeded his father in 1810. In 1832 he was elected to Parliament for Harwich, sitting as a moderate Whig. He did not contest the 1835 general election and was unsuccessful in his attempt to be re-elected in 1837. He was High Sheriff of Essex in 1840.

His son Christopher was also an MP.
