= Christopher Herrys =

Christopher Herrys or Harris (1599 – 1628), of Islington, Middlesex and Lincoln's Inn, London, was an English Member of Parliament (MP).

He was a Member of the Parliament of England for Harwich in 1624, 1625, 1626 and 1628.
