= Thomas Middleton (1654–1702) =

English Member of Parliament

Sir Thomas Middleton (1654-1702), of Stansted Mountfitchet, Essex, was an English Member of Parliament (MP).

He was a Member of the Parliament of England for Harwich in October 1679, 1681, 1689, 1690, 1695 and 1699.
