= Eldred (surname) =

Eldred is a surname of Old English origin. Notable people with this surname include:

- Arthur Rose Eldred (1895–1951), American businessman and the first Eagle Scout
- Brad Eldred (born 1980), American baseball player
- Brick Eldred (1892–1976), American baseball player
- Cal Eldred (born 1967), American baseball player
- Dale Eldred (1933–1993), American sculptor
- Eric Eldred (born 1943), American businessman and plaintiff in the 2003 court case, Eldred v. Ashcroft
- Foss O. Eldred (1884–1956), American politician and Michigan Attorney General (1946)
- Janet Eldred, American professor and author
- John Eldred (1552–1632), English traveller and merchant
- John Eldred (MP) (1629–1717), Member of the Parliament of England for Harwich in 1689
- Mike Eldred, American guitarist and luthier
- Mike Eldred, American musical theater performer
- Pamela Eldred (born 1948), American beauty pageant winner, Miss America 1970
- Ted Eldred (1920–2005), Australian scuba gear designer
- Thomas Brownell Eldred (1903–1993), American painter and printmaker
- Thomas Eldred (1561–1624), English merchant and mariner
- William Eldred (1563–1646), English gunner

== See also ==
- Eldred (given name)
- Eldred (disambiguation)
- Eldredge (disambiguation)
- Ealdred
- Aldred
