= Eldred =

Eldred may refer to:

== Places ==
=== United States settlements ===
- Eldred, Illinois
- Eldred, Kansas
- Eldred, Minnesota
- Eldred, New York
- Eldred, Pennsylvania
- Eldred Township (disambiguation)

=== Geographical features ===
- Eldred Glacier, King George Island east of Potts Peak, South Shetland Islands
- Eldred Point, ice-covered point on the coast of Marie Byrd Land
- Eldred Rock, island in the boroughs of Juneau and Haines, Alaska, United States
- Eldred Rock Light, historic octagonal lighthouse adjacent to Lynn Canal in Alaska

== People ==
- Eldred (surname)
- Eldred (given name)
- Eldred baronets of Saxham Magna, Suffolk, England

== Fictional characters ==
- Eldred, the main character of the video game Sacrifice
- Eldred Jonas, a character from the Stephen King novel Wizard and Glass
- "Sir Eldred of the Bower, a Legendary Tale", a 17th-century poem by Hannah More
- Eldred the Saxon, a figure in GK Chesterton's The Ballad of the White Horse
- Eldred Miller, bartender/saloon owner of The Silver Slipper on Little House on the Prairie

== See also ==
- Eldred Theater, a theater building at Case Western Reserve University, Cleveland, Ohio
- Eldred Act, Public Domain Enhancement Act (PDEA), a bill in the United States Congress
