= Aldred =

Aldred is both a given name and a surname. Notable people with the name include:

- Aldred or Ealdred, archbishop of York of the 11th century
- Aldred of Lindisfarne, 10th-century Northumbrian bishop
- Aldred the Scribe, 10th-century glossator
- Aldred Lumley, 10th Earl of Scarbrough, British peer and soldier

Surname:

- Anna Lee Aldred (1921–2006), first American woman to be granted a jockey's license
- Cyril Aldred (1914–1991), British Egyptologist, art historian and author
- Duncan Aldred (born 1970), American motor industry executive
- Graeme Aldred (1966–1987), English footballer
- Guy Aldred (1886–1963), British anarchist communist and publisher
- Jim Aldred (born 1963), Canadian ice hockey coach and player
- John Aldred (disambiguation), several people
- Ken Aldred (1945–2016), Australian politician
- Mark Aldred (born 1987), British rower
- Mary Aldred, Australian politician
- Michael Aldred (1945–1995), English record producer
- Paul Aldred (born 1969), English cricketer
- Scott Aldred (born 1968), American baseball player
- Simon Aldred, British musician of the band Cherry Ghost
- Sophie Aldred (born 1962), English actress
- Thomas Aldred (disambiguation), several people

== See also ==
- Aldred's Case
- Aldred-Rogers Broadcasting
- Colin Allred (born 1983), American politician
- Ealdred
- Eldred (given name)
- Eldred (surname)
