= Eldred (given name) =

Eldred is a given name and may refer to:

- William Eldred Berntsen (1912–1994), Danish competitive sailor and Olympic medalist
- Eldred Byerly or Bud Byerly "Bud" Byerly (1920–2012), American professional baseball pitcher
- Eldred James "Jim" Eggins (1898–1952), Australian politician
- Eldred Evans (1937–2022), British architect
- Eldred Hallas (1870–1926), British politician, MP for Birmingham Duddeston from 1918 to 1922
- Eldred Hawken (born 1989), South African cricketer
- William Eldred Hennessy, Australian violinist
- Eldred Henry (born 1994), athlete from the British Virgin Islands competing in shot put & discus
- Lloyd Eldred Herman (1936–2023), American arts administrator, curator, writer & museum planner
- Merritt Eldred Hoag (1909–1994), lieutenant commander in the U.S. Navy during World War II
- David Eldred Holt (1843–1925), American Episcopalian cleric
- Eldred D. Jones (1925–2020), Sierra Leonean academic, writer and literary critic
- Eldred Kasner (1941–2017), South African cricketer
- Eldred Kraemer (1929–1992), American football guard
- Eldred Kurtz Means (1878–1957), American Methodist Episcopal clergyman, public speaker and author
- Drew Eldred Nixon (born 1959), Republican Texas state senator from 1995 to 2001
- Eldred Norman (1914–1971), Australian inventor and racing-car driver
- Eldred Gregory Peck (1916–2003), American actor and popular film star from the 1940s to the 1960s
- Eldred Pottinger (1811–1843), Anglo-Indian army officer and diplomat
- Eldred Simkins (1779–1831), U.S. Representative from South Carolina
- Eldred G. Smith (1907–2013), American patriarch to the LDS Church from 1947 to 1979
- Eldred Stebbing (1921–2009), New Zealand record label owner, co-founder of the Zodiac Records label
- Eldred Tabachnik (1943–2020), South African-born English barrister, recorder, president of the Board of Deputies of British Jews
- Eldred Teague (1820–1902), Alabama Baptist minister and educational leader
- Eldred Nathaniel Woodcock (1846–1917), hunter and trapper of Potter County, Pennsylvania

== See also ==
- Eldred (surname)
- Eldred (disambiguation)
- Eldredge (disambiguation)
- Ealdred
- Aldred
