= David Holt =

David or Dave Holt may refer to:

== Sports ==
- Dave Holt (athlete) (born 1944), English runner who competed in the 1972 Olympics
- David Holt (bowls) (born 1966), England international lawn and indoor bowler
- David Holt (cricketer) (born 1981), Anglo-French cricketer
- David Holt (footballer, born 1936), Scottish international footballer
- David Holt (footballer, born 1952) (1952–2003), English professional footballer

== Other people ==
- David Holt (American actor) (1927–2003), American actor
- David Eldred Holt (1843–1925), American clergyman
- David Holt (musician) (born 1946), American musician
- David Lee Holt (born 1960), American musician
- David Holt (voice actor) (born 1966), British voice actor
- David Holt (politician) (born 1979), former Oklahoma State Senator, Mayor of Oklahoma City
- David Holt (psychotherapist) (1926–2002), English psychotherapist
