= Gun laying =

Process of aiming an artillery piece or turret

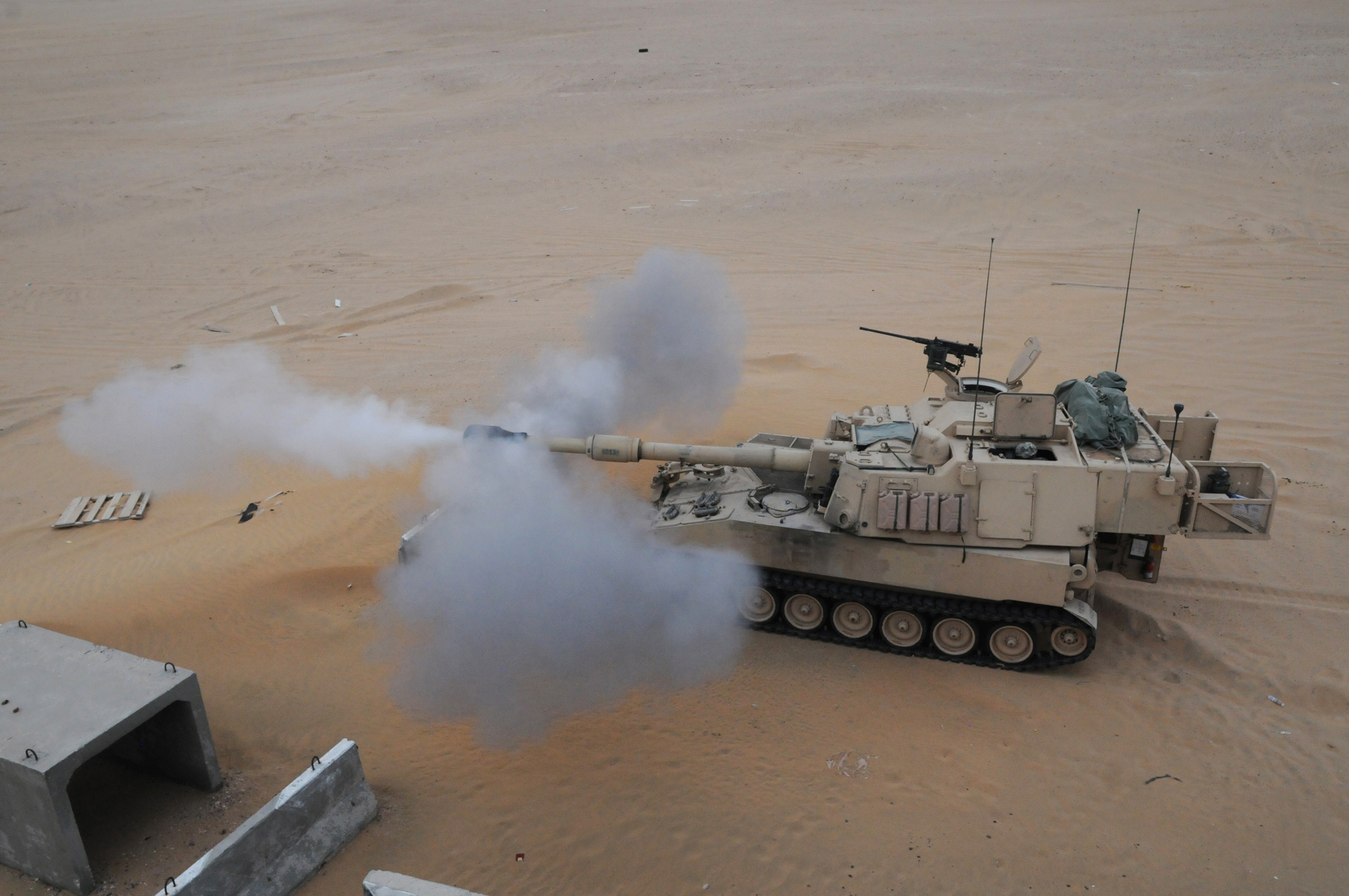
A US Army M109A6 Paladin self-propelled howitzer performing direct fire, 2013

Gun laying or gun training is the process of aiming an artillery piece or turret, such as a gun, howitzer, or mortar, on land, at sea, or in air, against surface or aerial targets. It may be laying for either direct fire, where the gun is aimed directly at a target within the line-of-sight of the user, or by indirect fire, where the gun is not aimed directly at a target within the line-of-sight of the user.

Indirect fire is determined from the information or data that is collected, calculated, and applied to physical coordinates to identify the location of the target by the user. The term includes automated aiming using, for example, radar-derived target data and computer-controlled guns.

== Description ==
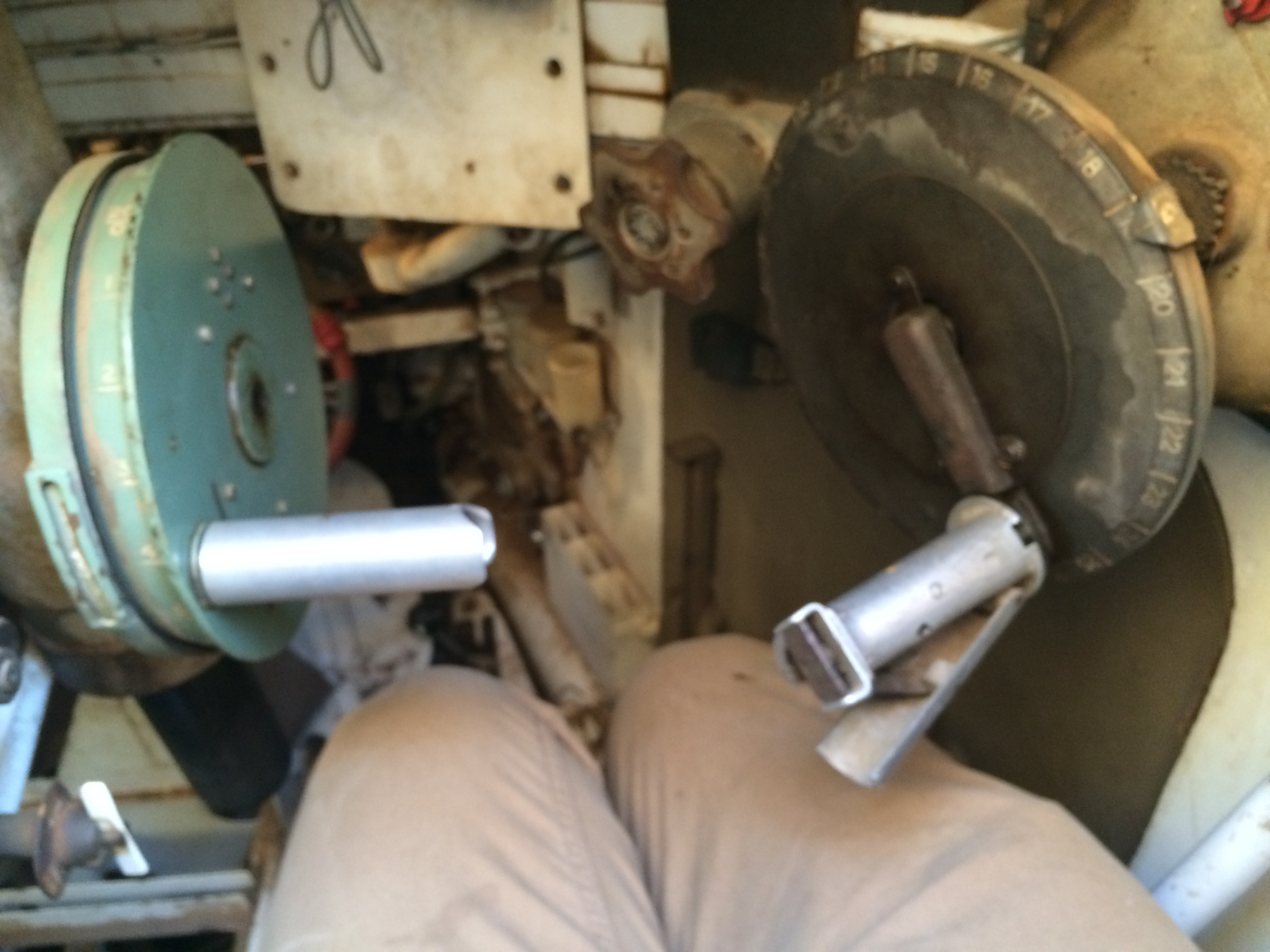
Manual traverse for an Eland armoured car. Gun elevation is controlled by the left traverse wheel, horizontal turret rotation by the right.

Gun laying is a set of actions to align the axis of a gun barrel so that it points in the required direction. Such may be for direct fire, where the target is visible for the gun, or indirect fire, where the target is not be visible from the gun. This alignment is divided into in the horizontal and vertical planes, called:

- elevation, sometimes laying – alignment in the vertical plane to range it to the target
- traverse, sometimes training – alignment in the horizontal plane to align it with the target

The terms "gun laying" and "gun training" was used for the Bofors 40 mm L/60 gun in the US Navy, which required two people for aiming. The gun mount featured two seats, the left seat being for the gun layer (also featuring the firing pedal), and the right seat being for the gun trainer.

Laying in the vertical plane (elevation angle) uses data derived from trials or empirical experience. For any given gun and projectile types, it reflects the distance to the target and the size of the propellant charge. It also incorporates any differences in height between gun and target. With indirect fire, it may allow for other variables as well.

With direct fire, laying in the horizontal plane is merely the line of sight to the target, although the layer may make allowance for the wind, and with rifled guns the sights may compensate for projectile "drift". With indirect fire the horizontal angle is relative to something, typically the gun's aiming point, although with modern electronic sights it may be a north-seeking gyro.

Depending on the gun mount, there is usually a choice of two trajectories that will result in the shot landing in the same spot. The dividing angle between the trajectories is about 45 degrees (usually between 0 degrees and 90 degrees), it varies slightly due to gun dependent factors. Below 45 degrees the trajectory is called "low angle" (or lower register), above 45 degrees is "high angle" (or upper register). The differences are that low angle fire has a shorter time of flight, a lower apex, and flatter angle of descent.

All guns have carriages or mountings that support the barrel assembly (called the ordnance in some countries). Early guns could only be traversed by moving their entire carriage or mounting, and this lasted with heavy artillery into World War II. Mountings could be fitted into traversing turrets on ships, coast defences or tanks. From circa 1900 field artillery carriages provided traverse without moving the wheels and trail.

The carriage, or mounting, also enabled the barrel to be set at the required elevation angle. With some gun mounts it is possible to depress the gun, i.e., move it in the vertical plane to point it below the horizon. Some guns require a near-horizontal elevation for loading. An essential capability for any elevation mechanism is to prevent the weight of the barrel forcing its heavier end downward. This is greatly helped by having trunnions (around which the elevating mass rotates vertically) at the centre of gravity, although a counterbalance mechanism can be used. It also means the elevation gear has to be strong enough to resist considerable downward pressure but still be easy for the gun layer to use.

Until recoil systems were invented in the late 19th century and integrated into the gun carriage or mount, guns moved substantially backwards when they fired, and had to be moved forward before they could be laid. However, mortars, where the recoil forces were transferred directly into the ground (or water, if mounted on a ship), did not always require such movement. With the adoption of recoil systems for field artillery, it became normal to pivot the saddle on the lower carriage, initially this "top traverse" was only a few degrees but soon offered a full circle, particularly for anti-aircraft guns. The introduction of recoil systems was an important milestone.

== History ==
=== Background ===
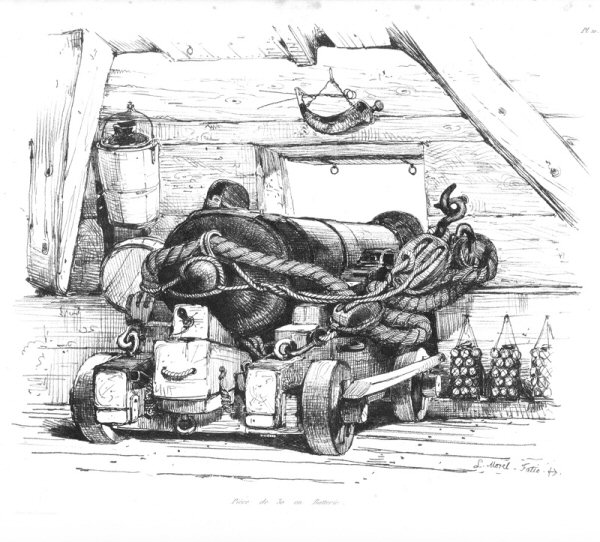
36-pounder long gun at the ready

The earliest guns were loaded from the muzzle. They were typically little more than bare barrels moved in wagons and placed on the ground for firing, then wooden frames and beds were introduced. Horizontal alignment with the target was by eye, while vertical laying was done by raising the muzzle with timber or digging a hole for the closed end.

Gun carriages were introduced in the 15th century. Two large-diameter wheels, axle-tree and a trail became the standard pattern for field use. The barrel was mounted in a wooden cradle with trunnions to mount it on the carriage. As technology improved, the trunnions became part of the barrel and the cradle was abandoned. Nevertheless, they were relatively large and heavy.

Horizontal alignment was a matter of moving the trail. To achieve the required elevation angle, various arrangements were used. At the simplest, it was wedges or quoins between the breech and the trail, but wooden quadrants, or simple scaffolds mounted on the trail, were also used to support the breech and provided larger choice of elevation angle. Screw elevation devices were also used as early as the 16th century.

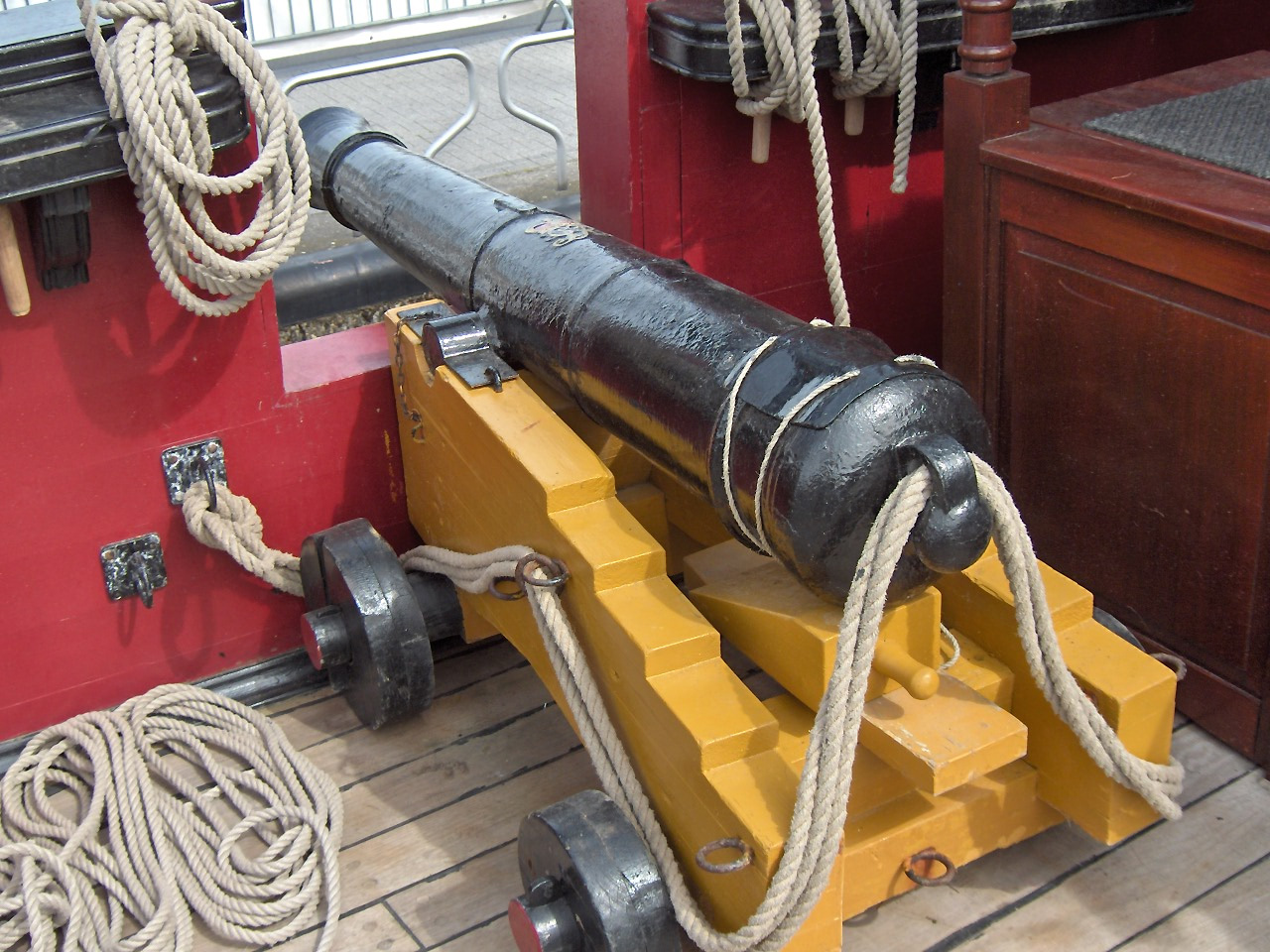
A naval cannon mounted on its gun carriage. The breech rope is visible.

However, naval and some fortress carriages and mounting evolved differently. Field mobility was not required, so large wheels and trails were irrelevant. Headspace below decks was often low. This led to compact carriages, mostly on four small wheels. Obviously, large horizontal traverses were more difficult, but such things were unnecessary when shooting broadside. However, in fortresses wider traverse was required. One solution was platform and slide mountings. Wide traverse was also useful on some shipmounted guns.

Laying required sights. At its simplest, this means nothing more than aiming the guns in the right direction. However, various aids emerged. Horizontal aiming involved sighting along the barrel, this was enhanced by a notch made in the ring around the barrel at the breech end and an 'acorn' on the ring around the muzzle. This was still used in the 19th century in some instances.

The range with a flat trajectory was called 'point blank' range. However, while point blank may have been enough for some purposes, field artillery (whether mobile or static) and guns in fortresses needed longer range. This required ways to measure elevation angles and know the relationship between the elevation angle and the range.

=== Early mechanical gunnery aids ===
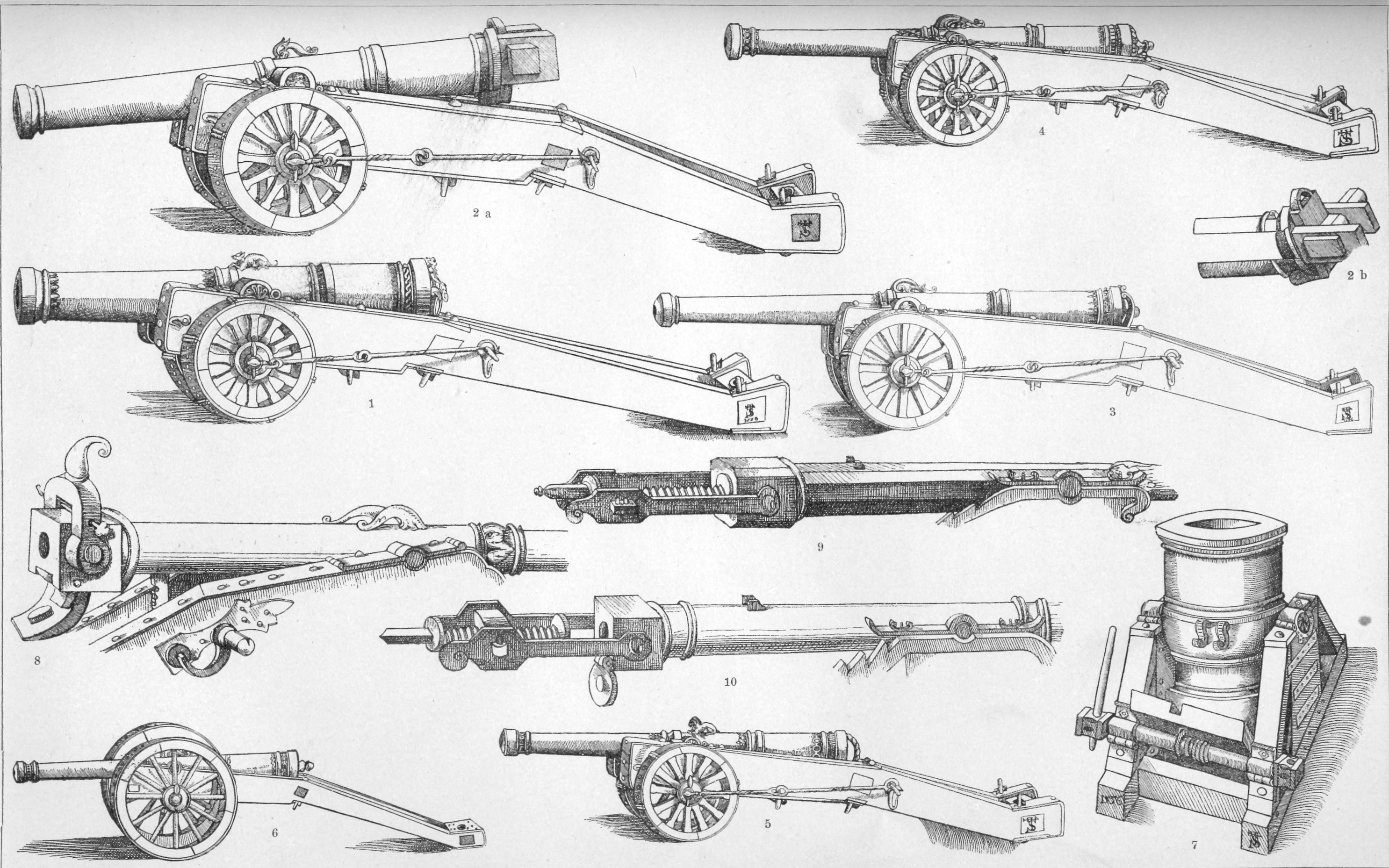
Various 16th-century artillery pieces, including culverin, falconet and mortar

The first recorded device to measure an elevation angle was Niccolò Tartaglia's invention of a gunners' quadrant circa 1545. This device had two arms at right angles connected by an arc marked with angular graduations. One arm was placed in the muzzle, and a plumb bob suspended against the arc showed the elevation angle. This led to many calculations relating elevation angle to range.

The problem was that these calculations assumed what today is called an "in vacuo" trajectory – they made no allowance for air resistance against the projectile. What was needed were range and accuracy trials to determine the actual relationship between range and elevation angle. The practical approach was conducted by William Eldred, Master Gunner at Dover Castle, in gunnery trials in 1613, 1617 and 1622. He used a wide variety of guns, including the culverin, demiculverin, falconet and Saker. From the results of these trials, he produced range tables for elevations up to 10 degrees for each type with a standard propelling charge weight.

A problem affecting gun laying, was the tapered external barrel shape. This affected elevation when the gun was aimed by sighting along the top of the barrel. In the early 17th century, 'dispart sights' compensated for this. This was a piece of metal placed on the muzzle to make the line of sight parallel to the axis of the bore. Another technique involved measuring the depth of the barrel through the touchhole and at the muzzle, the difference being the wedge size needed to compensate for the tapered barrel.

Ballistic pendulum, invented by Benjamin Robins to calculate muzzle velocity.

The ballistic pendulum was invented in 1742 by English mathematician Benjamin Robins, and published in his book New Principles of Gunnery, which revolutionized the science of ballistics, as it provided the first way to accurately measure the velocity of a bullet.

Robins used the ballistic pendulum to measure projectile velocity in two ways. The first was to attach the gun to the pendulum, and measure the recoil. Since the momentum of the gun is equal to the momentum of the ejecta, and since the projectile was (in those experiments) the large majority of the mass of the ejecta, the velocity of the bullet could be approximated. The second, and more accurate method, was to directly measure the bullet momentum by firing it into the pendulum. Robins experimented with musket balls of around one ounce in mass (30 g), while other contemporaries used his methods with cannon shot of one to three pounds (0.45 to 1.36 kg).

The first system to supplant ballistic pendulums with direct measures of projectile speed was invented in 1808, during the Napoleonic Wars and used a rapidly rotating shaft of known speed with two paper disks on it; the bullet was fired through the disks, parallel to the shaft, and the angular difference in the points of impact provided an elapsed time over the distance between the disks. A direct electromechanical clockwork measure appeared in 1840, with a spring-driven clock started and stopped by electromagnets, whose current was interrupted by the bullet passing through two meshes of fine wires, again providing the time to traverse the given distance.

Tangent sights were introduced in the 19th century. These provided the rear sight used with an 'acorn' or similar foresight at the muzzle. The tangent sight was mounted in a bracket beside or behind the breech, the eyepiece (a hole or notch) was atop a vertical bar that moved up and down in the bracket. The bar was marked in yards or degrees. This direct-fire sight was aimed at the target by moving the trail horizontally and elevating or depressing the barrel. By the late 19th century the simple open tangent sights were being replaced by optical telescopes on mounts with an elevation scale and screw aligned to the axis of the bore.

=== Modern era of gunlaying ===
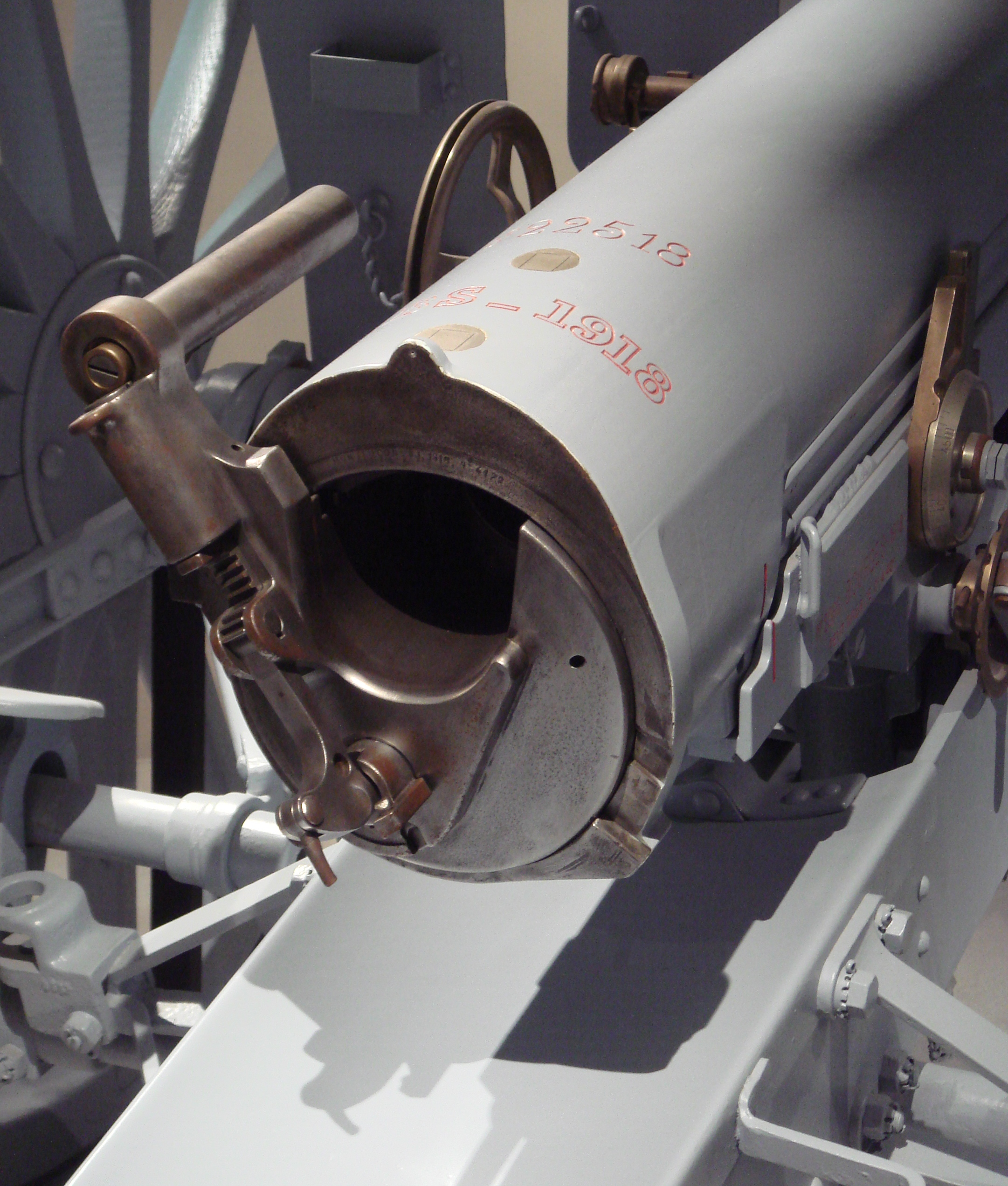
Canon de 75 modèle 1897 breech mechanism

Rifled and breech loading artillery were introduced from the mid-19th century, notably by William Armstrong, whose gun equipped Royal Navy warships from the 1850s. An important advance in the art of gun laying came with the introduction of the first recoil mechanisms. The barrel recoil was absorbed by hydraulic cylinders and then the barrel was returned to its firing position by a spring that had stored some of the recoil energy. This meant the gun did not have to be repositioned after each time it was fired.

An early prototype incorporating this design feature was built in 1872 by Russian engineer, Vladimir Stepanovich Baranovsky. His 2.5-inch rapid-firing gun was also equipped with a screw breech, a self-cocking firing mechanism and it fired a fixed round (shell and cartridge case together). The recoil mechanism was contained in the gun cradle.

Despite this effort, nothing followed from it, and it was only with the introduction of the French 75 mm in 1897, that recoil systems started to become normal. The gun's barrel slid back on rollers, pushing a piston into an oil-filled cylinder. This action absorbed the recoil progressively as the internal air pressure rose and, at the end of recoil, generated a strong, but decreasing, back pressure that returned the gun forward to its original position. By this time smokeless powder had replaced gunpowder as the standard propellant.

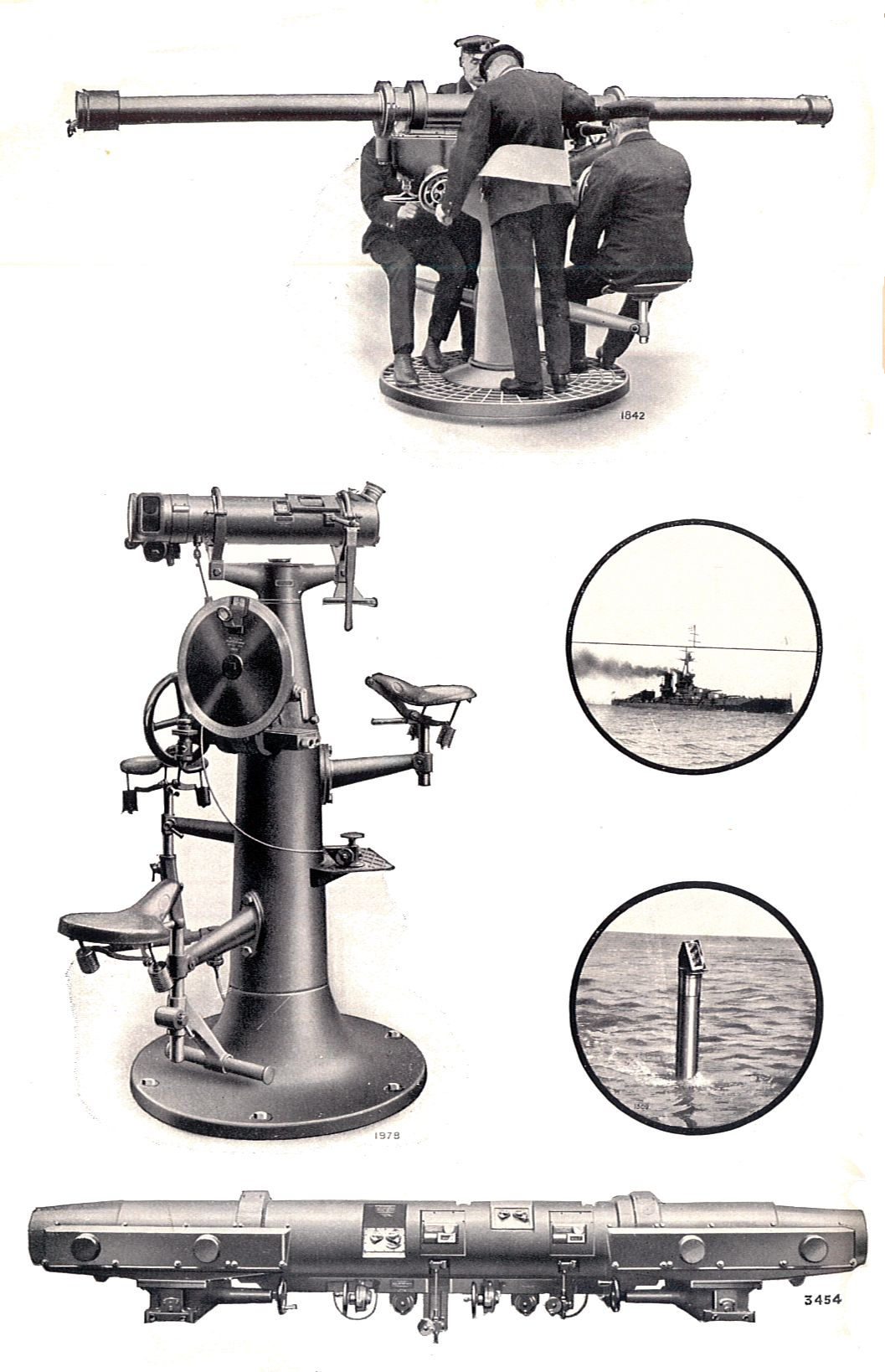
Naval range-finding instruments of 1936

The first practical rangefinder was developed by Barr & Stroud a pioneering Scottish optical engineering firm. Archibald Barr and William Stroud became associated from 1888. In 1891 they were approached by the Admiralty to submit a design for a short-base rangefinder for trial, and in 1892 they were awarded with a contract for six of their rangefinders. The device, operated by one person, brought two images from a distance object into coincidence allowing the distance to be calculated from their relative motions.

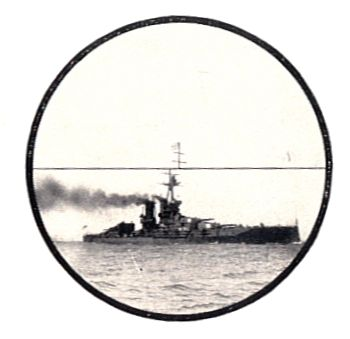
Eyepiece image of a naval rangefinder, showing the displaced image when not yet adjusted for range

Now that the barrel remained aligned with the target after firing, the more primitive tangent sight was replaced with the rocking-bar sight for direct-fire sighting. These were installed on QF 4.7-inch Gun Mk I–IV quick firing gun from 1887. The rocking-bar (or 'bar and drum') sight had an elevation scale, could mount a telescope as well as the open sight, and provided a small amount of horizontal deflection. These provided 'independent line of sight' because they enabled data to be set on the mount and the telescope (or open sight) aimed at the target independent of the barrel elevation.

A related problem, particularly for large and longer range guns, was that the wheels could be at different heights due to the slope of the ground, which caused inaccuracy. Before the First World War, the British BL 60-pounder gun was fitted with oscillating (reciprocating) sights, using sighting telescopes, a sight clinometer and range scale as well as a deflection drum for the telescope. These mounts could be cross-leveled, which removed the need for the gun commander to calculate a deflection correction for uneven wheels. Cross-leveling introduced the third axis into laying.

==== Indirect artillery fire ====
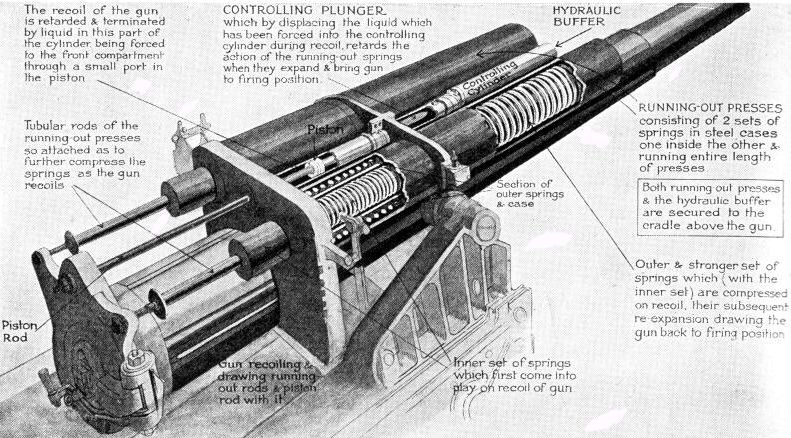
Recoil mechanism on the BL 60-pounder gun Mk. I, 1916.

Modern indirect fire dates from the late 19th century. In 1882, Russian Lt Col KG Guk published Field Artillery Fire from Covered Positions that described a better method of indirect laying (instead of aiming points in line with the target). In essence, this was the geometry of using angles to aiming points that could be in any direction relative to the target. The problem was the lack of an azimuth instrument to enable it; clinometers for elevation already existed.

The Germans solved this problem by inventing the Richtfläche, or lining-plane, in about 1890. This was a gun-mounted rotatable open sight, mounted in alignment with the bore, and able to measure large angles from it. Similar designs, usually able to measure angles in a full circle, were widely adopted over the following decade. By the early 1900s the open sight was sometimes replaced by a telescope and the term goniometer had replaced "lining-plane" in English.

The first documented use of indirect fire in war using Guk's methods, albeit without lining-plane sights was on 26 October 1899 by British gunners during the Second Boer War. Although both sides demonstrated early on in the conflict that could use the technique effectively, in many subsequent battles, British commanders nonetheless ordered artillery to be "less timid" and to move forward to address troops' concerns about their guns abandoning them.The British used improvised gun arcs with howitzers; the sighting arrangements used by the Boers with their German and French guns is unclear.

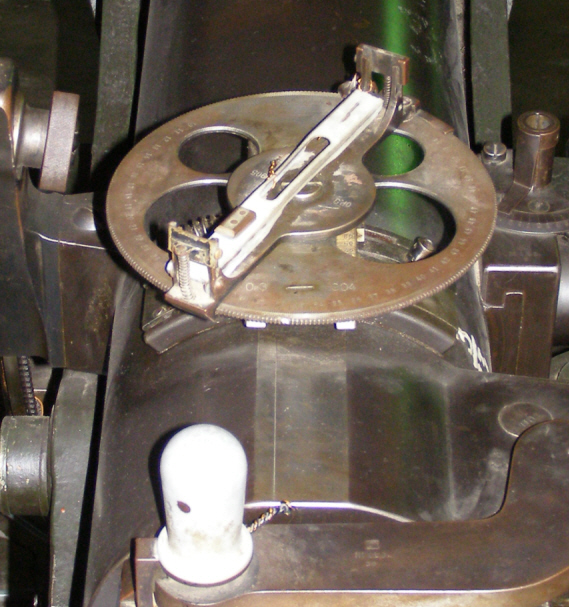
A 1904 Russian lining plane sight.

Optical sights appeared in the first years of the 20th century, and the German Goerz panoramic sight became the pattern for the rest of the 20th century. They were graduated in degrees and 5 minute intervals, decigrads or mils (4320, 4000 or 6000/6300/6400 to a circle).

A feature of 20th-century laying was the use of one- or two-man laying. The US was notable for using two-man laying, horizontal on one side of the gun, elevation on the other. Most other nations mostly used one-man laying. The laying drill, dealing with all three axes, typically adopted this sequence: "roughly for line, roughly for elevation, cross-level, accurately for line, accurately for elevation".

The other main difference in sighting arrangements was the use of an elevation angle or alternatively the range. This issue became more complicated in World War I when the effects of barrel wear in changing muzzle velocity were fully recognised. This meant that different guns needed a different elevation angle for the same range. This led many armies to use an elevation angle calculated in a battery command post. However, in the 1930s the British adopted calibrating sights in which range was set on the sight, which automatically compensated for the difference of muzzle velocity from standard.

An alternative to this was a 'gun rule' at each gun; in this case the range was set on the rule and an elevation angle read and given to the layer to set on the sight. The issue was finally resolved by the introduction of digital computers in the battery command post that calculated the correct elevation angle for the range and muzzle velocity accurately and quickly.

Apart from calibrating sights, there was no significant difference in field artillery laying arrangements for most of the 20th century. However, in the 1990s new or modified guns started adopting digital sights, following their successful use in the multi-launch rocket system developed in the 1970s. In these the azimuth and elevation were entered manually or automatically into a layers computer, then guided the layer's use of horizontal and elevation controls until the barrel was in the required horizontal and vertical alignment. This computed a correction for the cross level of the gun and used feedback from electro-mechanical devices, such as gyroscopes and electronic clinometers, aligned to the axis of the bore. These devices were subsequently replaced by ring laser gyros.

==== Coastal and naval gun laying advances ====
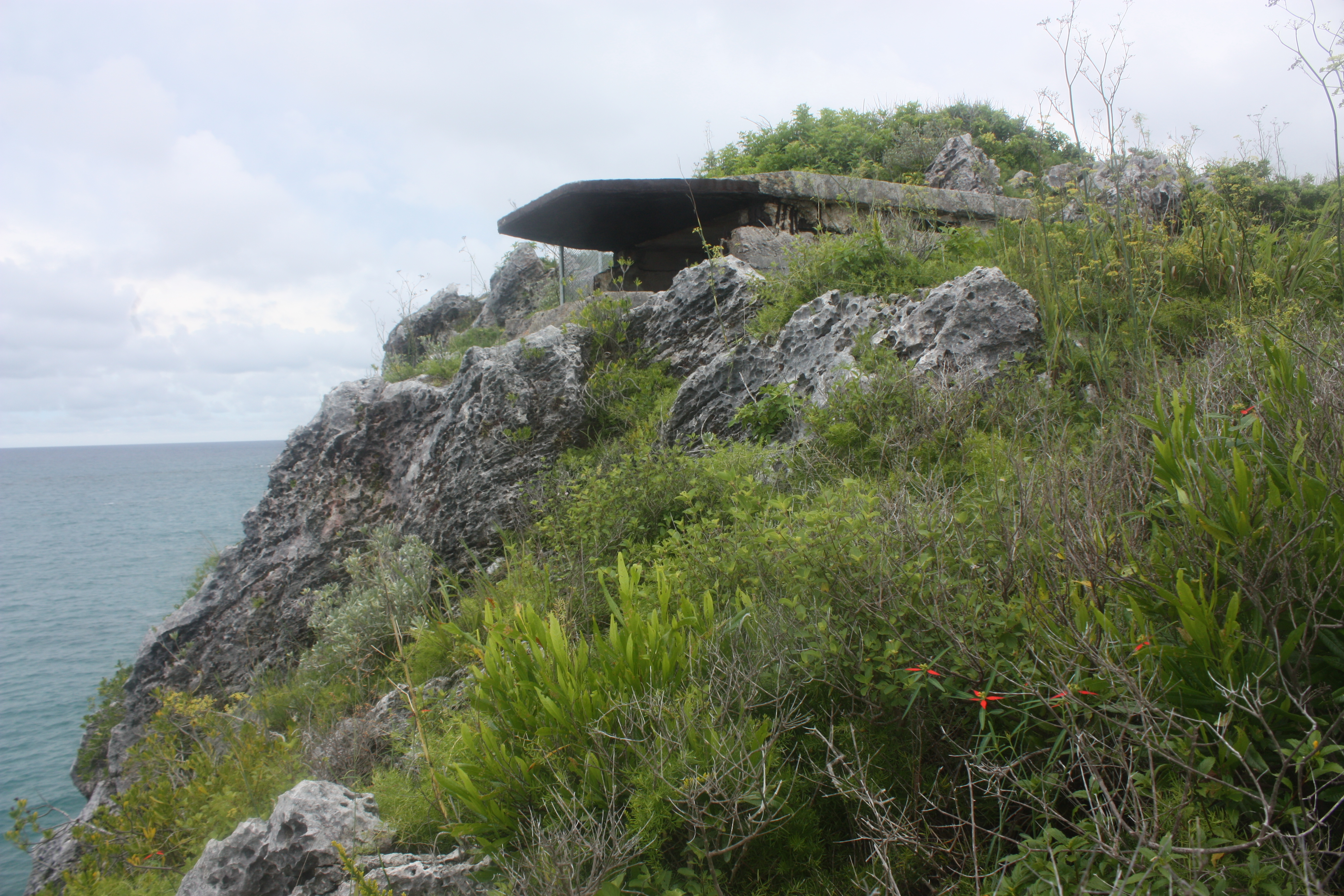
The Range Finder Building, built into the cliff face at St. David's Battery, Bermuda, captured data that was used in the plotting room to produce gun-laying data.

Most coastal artillery was in fixed defences, "fortresses" in some form. Their targets moved in two dimensions, and the gun had to be aimed at the target's future position. Some guns were relatively small calibre and dealt with relatively close targets, others were much larger for long-range targets.

Coast artillery employed direct fire, and until the late 19th century laying had changed little, apart from gaining telescopic sights, over the centuries.

Nineteenth-century improvements in gun design and ammunition greatly extended their effective range. In 1879, Major H. S. Watkins of the Royal Garrison Artillery invented the depression range finder, the position-range finder and associated fire control systems.

His description explains its essence:

The position-finder traces the course of the ship, and when the guns are ready to lay, predicts the position the ship will occupy half a minute or more in advance. The dials on the gun floor automatically indicate the range and training to hit the predicted position. When the guns are laid an electric tube (i.e., primer) is inserted and the signal goes up to the observing station that all is ready for firing. The non-commissioned officer in charge of the position-finder watches for the appearance of the ship in the field of view of his telescope, and when she arrives at the cross wires presses a button, and the guns are fired.

It took almost 20 years to get it to full effectiveness, but its general principle became the norm for heavy artillery fire control and laying. Shorter-range guns retained conventional direct-fire laying with telescopes for much longer. In the 20th century, coast artillery, like field and the larger anti-aircraft guns, included corrections for non-standard conditions such as wind and temperature in their calculations.

==== Fire control systems ====
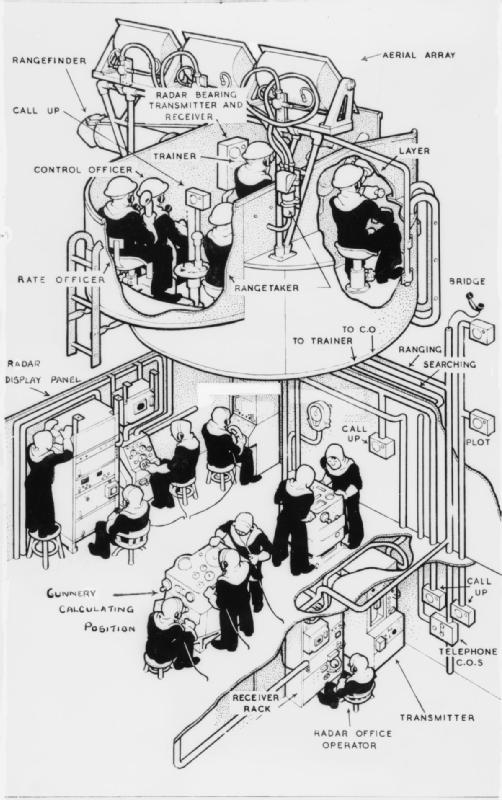
Accurate fire control systems were introduced in the early 20th century. Pictured, a cut-away view of a destroyer. The below decks analog computer is shown in the centre of the drawing and is labelled "Gunnery Calculating Position".

Naval artillery on board capital ships soon adopted gunlaying arrangements broadly similar to Major Watkins' coast artillery pattern. The introduction of breech-loading guns, then recoil systems and smokeless powder, completed the change in warship armament from hull-mounted to turreted guns.

However, ships had a complication compared to land based guns: they were firing from a moving platform. This meant that their laying calculations had to predict the future position of both ship and target. Increasingly sophisticated mechanical calculators were employed for proper gun laying, typically with various spotters and distance measures being sent to a central plotting station deep within the ship. There the fire direction teams fed in the location, speed and direction of the ship and its target, as well as various adjustments for Coriolis effect, weather effects on the air, and other adjustments.

The resulting directions, known as a firing solution, would then be fed back out to the turrets for laying. If the rounds missed, an observer could work out how far they missed by and in which direction, and this information could be fed back into the computer along with any changes in the rest of the information and another shot attempted.

Rudimentary naval fire control systems were first developed around the time of World War I. Arthur Pollen and Frederic Charles Dreyer independently developed the first such systems. Pollen began working on the problem after noting the poor accuracy of naval artillery at a gunnery practice near Malta in 1900. Lord Kelvin, widely regarded as Britain's leading scientist first proposed using an analogue computer to solve the equations which arise from the relative motion of the ships engaged in the battle and the time delay in the flight of the shell to calculate the required trajectory and therefore the direction and elevation of the guns.

Pollen aimed to produce a combined mechanical computer and automatic plot of ranges and rates for use in centralised fire control. To obtain accurate data of the target's position and relative motion, Pollen developed a plotting unit (or plotter) to capture this data. He added a gyroscope to allow for the yaw of the firing ship. Again this required substantial development of the, at the time, primitive gyroscope to provide continuous reliable correction. Trials were carried out in 1905 and 1906, which although completely unsuccessful showed promise. He was encouraged in his efforts by the rapidly rising figure of Admiral Jackie Fisher, Admiral Arthur Knyvet Wilson and the Director of Naval Ordnance and Torpedoes (DNO), John Jellicoe. Pollen continued his work, with tests carried out on Royal Navy warships intermittently.

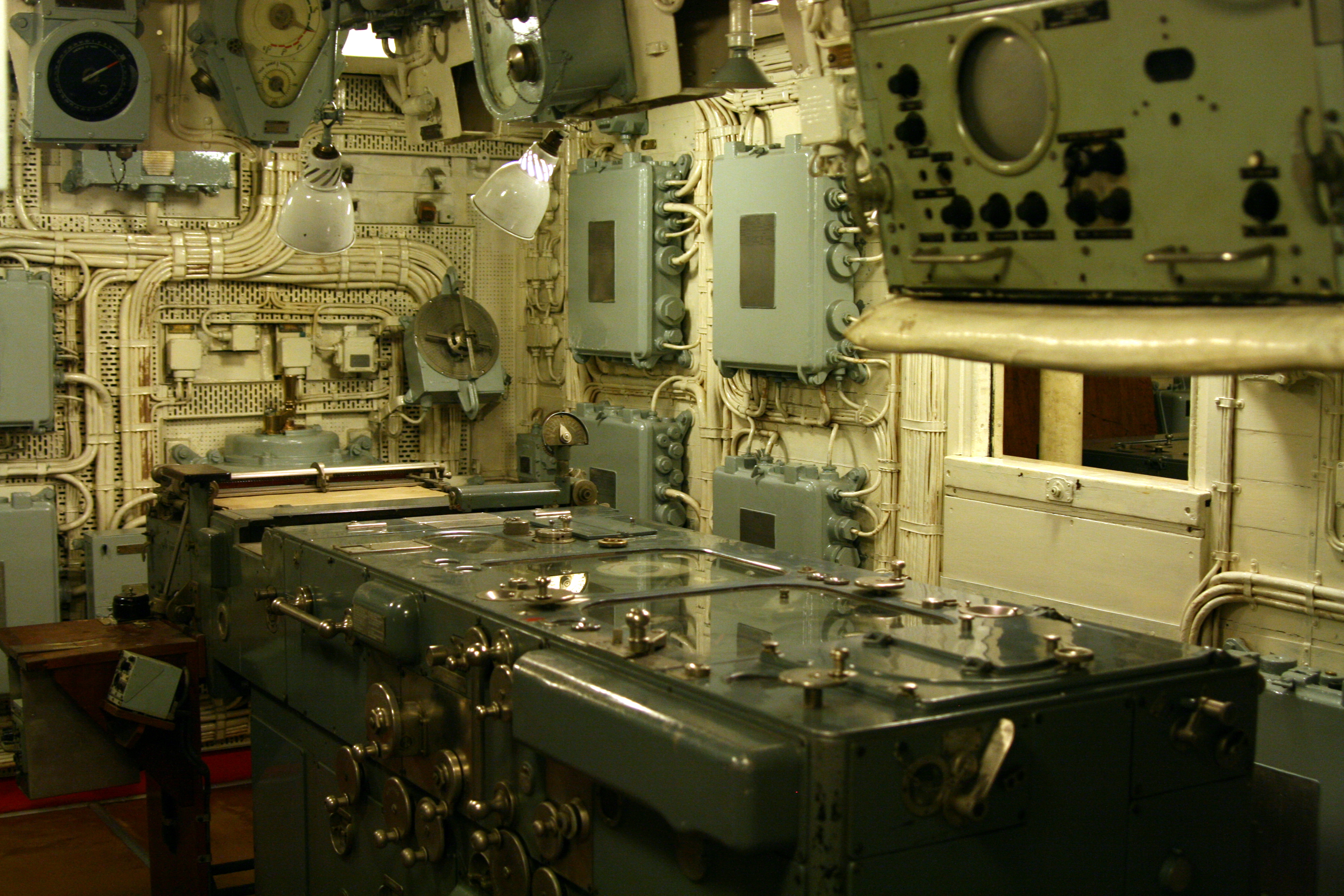
Admiralty Fire Control Table in the transmitting station of HMS Belfast.

Meanwhile, a group led by Dreyer designed a similar system. Although both systems were ordered for new and existing ships of the Royal Navy, the Dreyer system eventually found most favour with the Navy in its definitive Mark IV* form. The addition of director control facilitated a full, practicable fire control system for World War I ships, and most RN capital ships were so fitted by mid 1916. The director was high up over the ship where operators had a superior view over any gunlayer in the turrets. It was also able to co-ordinate the fire of the turrets so that their combined fire worked together. This improved aiming and larger optical rangefinders improved the estimate of the enemy's position at the time of firing. The system was eventually replaced by the improved "Admiralty Fire Control Table" for ships built after 1927.

By the 1950s gun turrets were increasingly unmanned, with gun laying controlled remotely from the ship's control centre using inputs from radar and other sources.

Telescopic sights for tanks were adopted before World War II, and these sights usually had a means of aiming off for target movement and graticules marked for different ranges. Tank sights were of two general types. Either the sight was in fixed alignment with the axis of the bore with ranges marked in the sight, and the gunner laid the range mark on the target. Or during laying the gunner physically set the range to offset the axis of the bore from the axis of the sight by the correct amount and laid using the centre mark in the sight.

Some sights had a means of estimating the range, for example using a stadiametric method. Other tanks used an optical coincident range-finder or after World War II, a ranging machine gun. From the 1970s these were replaced by laser range finders. However, tank guns could not be fired accurately while moving until gun stabilisation was introduced. This appeared at the end of World War II. Some were hydraulic, while others used electrical servos. During the 1970s tanks started being fitted with digital computers.

==== Anti-aircraft gun laying ====
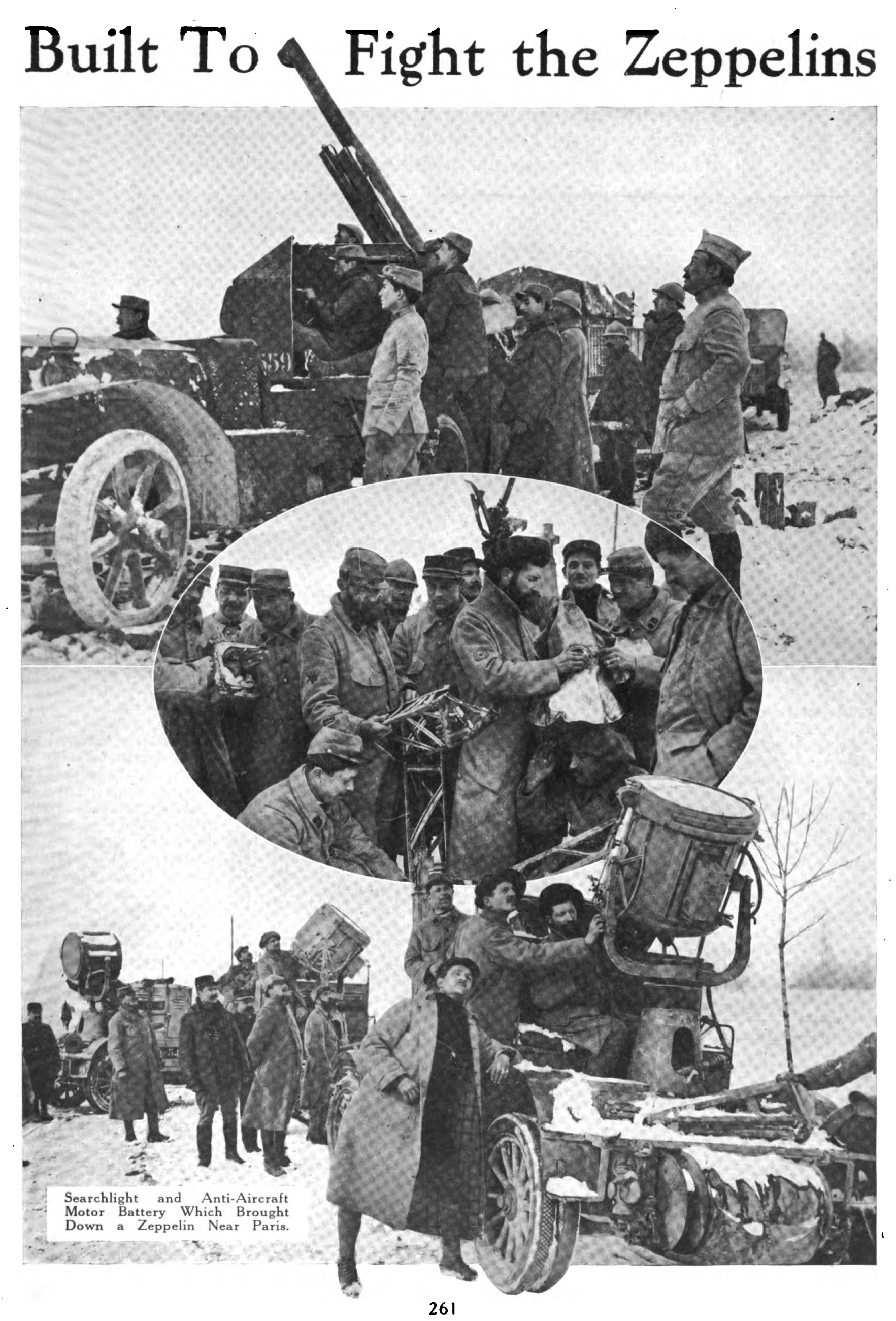
A French anti-aircraft motor battery (motorised AAA battery) that brought down a Zeppelin near Paris. From the journal Horseless Age, 1916

The need to engage balloons and airships, from both the ground and ships, was recognised at the beginning of the 20th century. Aircraft were soon added to the list and the others fell from significance. Anti-aircraft was direct fire, the layer aiming at the aircraft. However, the target is moving in three dimensions and this makes it a difficult target. The basic issue is that either the layer aims at the target and some mechanism aligns the gun at the future (time of flight) position of the target or the layer aims at the future position of the aircraft. In either case the problem is determining the target's height, speed and direction and being able to 'aim-off' (sometimes called deflection laying) for the anti-aircraft projectile time of flight.

German air attacks on the British Isles began at the beginning of the First World War. Anti-aircraft gunnery was a difficult business. The problem was of successfully aiming a shell to burst close to its target's future position, with various factors affecting the shells' predicted trajectory. This was called deflection gun-laying, 'off-set' angles for range and elevation were set on the gunsight and updated as their target moved. In this method when the sights were on the target, the barrel was pointed at the target's future position. Range and height of the target determined fuze length. The difficulties increased as aircraft performance improved.

The British dealt with range measurement first, when it was realised that range was the key to producing a better fuse setting. This led to the Height/Range Finder (HRF), the first model being the Barr & Stroud UB2, a 2-metre optical coincident rangefinder mounted on a tripod. It measured the distance to the target and the elevation angle, which together gave the height of the aircraft. These were complex instruments and various other methods were also used. The HRF was soon joined by the Height/Fuze Indicator (HFI), this was marked with elevation angles and height lines overlaid with fuze length curves, using the height reported by the HRF operator, the necessary fuse length could be read off.

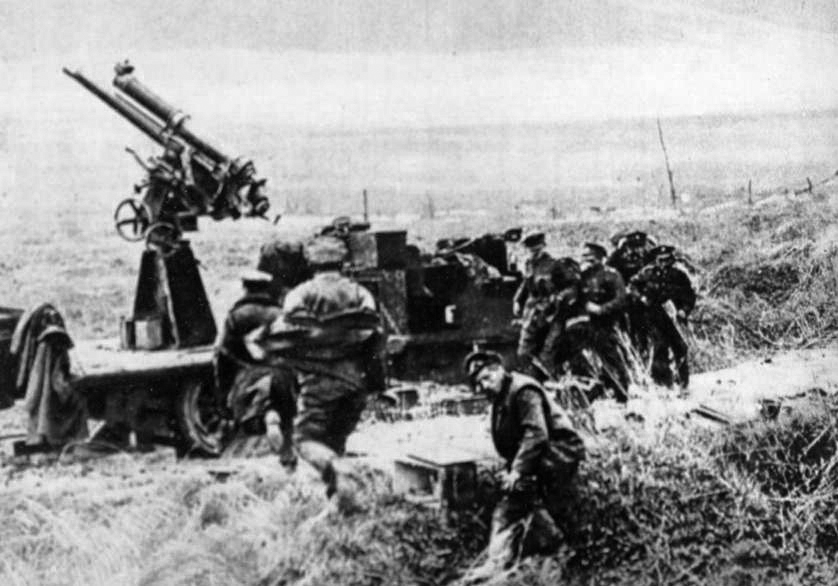
A Canadian anti-aircraft unit of 1918, running to stations

However, the problem of deflection settings—'aim-off'—required knowing the rate of change in the target's position. Both France and UK introduced tachymetric devices to track targets and produce vertical and horizontal deflection angles. The French Brocq system was electrical, the operator entered the target range and had displays at guns; it was used with their 75 mm. The British Wilson-Dalby gun director used a pair of trackers and mechanical tachymetry; the operator entered the fuse length, and deflection angles were read from the instruments.v

In 1925 the British adopted a new instrument developed by Vickers. It was a mechanical analogue computer Predictor AA No 1. Given the target height its operators tracked the target and the predictor produced bearing, quadrant elevation and fuze setting. These were passed electrically to the guns where they were displayed on repeater dials to the layers who 'matched pointers' (target data and the gun's actual data) to lay the guns. This system of repeater electrical dials built on the arrangements introduced by British coast artillery in the 1880s, and coast artillery was the background of many AA officers. Similar systems were adopted in other countries and for example the later Sperry device, designated M3A3 in the US was also used by Britain as the Predictor AA No 2. Height finders were also increasing in size, in Britain, the World War I Barr & Stroud UB 2 (7 feet (2.1 m) optical base) was replaced by the UB 7 (7 feet (2.1 m) feet optical base) and the UB 10 (18 feet (5.5 m) optical base, only used on static AA sites). Goertz in Germany and Levallois in France produced 5 metres (16 ft) instruments.

By World War II the situation was largely as follows: for targets up to a few thousand yards away, a smaller-calibre automatic gun was used, with simple sights that enabled a layer to judge the lead based on estimates of target range and speed; for longer-range targets, manually controlled predictors were used to track the target, taking inputs from optical or radar rangefinders, and calculating firing data for the guns, including allowance for wind and temperature.

After World War II predictors changed from being electro-mechanical analogue computers to digital computers; by this time heavy anti-aircraft guns had been replaced by missiles, but electronics enabled smaller guns to adopt fully automated laying.

== See also ==
- Arrow slit – Narrow vertical aperture in a fortification
- Artillery – Long-ranged guns for land warfare
- Embrasure – Opening in a battlement
- Enfilade and defilade – Military concepts about exposure to enemy fire
- Fire-control system – Ranged weapon assistance system
- Fortress – Military defensive construction
- Gun data computer – Artillery computers used by the U.S. Army
- Category:Gun laying radars
- Indirect fire – Weapons firing without line of sight on target
- Kerrison Predictor – Anti-aircraft fire-control system
