= Eldred, Kansas =

Unincorporated community in Barber County, Kansas

- Unincorporated community
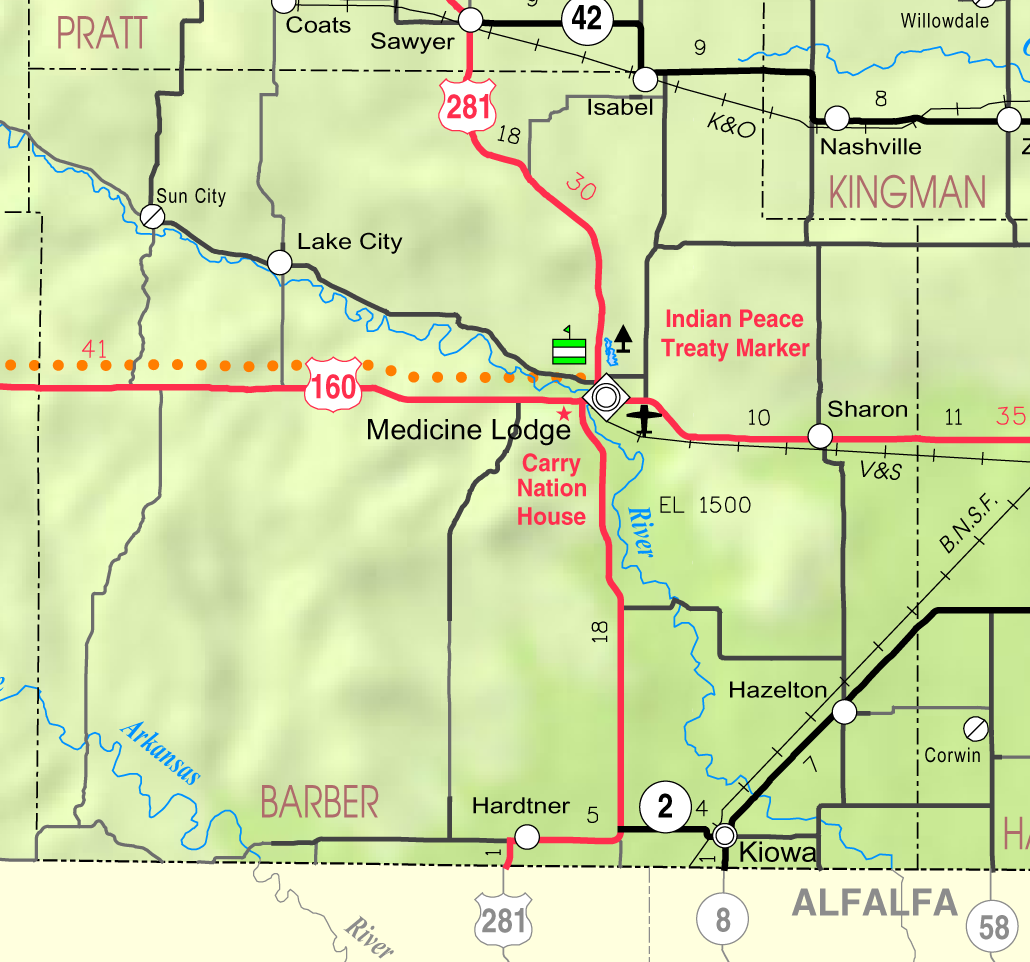
- KDOT map of Barber County (legend)

- Location within Kansas Location within the United States
- Coordinates: 37°03′02″N 98°46′04″W
- Country: United States
- State: Kansas
- County: Barber
- Township: Elwood
- Elevation: 1,667 ft (508 m)
- Time zone: UTC-6 (CST)
  - Summer (DST): UTC-5 (CDT)
- ZIP Code: 67057
- Area code: 620
- FIPS code: 20-20110
- GNIS ID: 484525

Eldred is an unincorporated community in Elwood Township, Barber County, Kansas, United States. It is located 7 miles (11 km) northwest of Hardtner.

== History ==
The post office in Eldred was discontinued in 1908.
