= John Aldred =

John Aldred may refer to:

- John Aldred (sound engineer) (1921–2020), British sound engineer
- John Alured (1607–1651), or Aldred, army officer
- John E. Aldred (1864–1945), director of United Railways and Electric Company of Baltimore, Maryland
- John William Aldred (1884–1970), English World War I flying ace
- John Aldred (MP) for Kingston upon Hull

== See also ==
- Aldred (surname)
