= Elwood Township =

Elwood Township:

- Elwood Township, Barber County, Kansas;
- Elwood Township, Vermilion County, Illinois.
