= Potts Peak =

Mountain in King George Island, South Shetland Islands, Antarctica

Location of Potts Peak in Antarctica

Potts Peak (61°58′S 58°18′W) is a peak standing at the west side of Eldred Glacier on the north coast of King George Island, South Shetland Islands. Named by the United Kingdom Antarctic Place-Names Committee (UK-APC) in 1960 for Captain Potts, Master of the sealing vessel L.P. Simmons from New London, CT, who visited the South Shetland Islands in 1873–74.
