= Eldredge =

Eldredge may refer to

- Eldredge (automobile), manufactured in Belvidere, Illinois by the National Sewing Machine Company

== People ==
- Alma Eldredge (1841–1925), American politician from Utah
- Barnabas Eldredge (died 1911), American founder of the Eldridge Sewing Machine Company and National Sewing Machine Company
- Brett Eldredge (born 1986), American country musician
- Charles Eldredge (disambiguation)
  - Charles A. Eldredge (1820–1896), American politician from Wisconsin
  - Charles C. Eldredge (born 1944), American art historian
- George Eldredge (1898–1977), American actor
- H. Wentworth Eldredge (1909–1991), American sociologist and WWII spy
- Horace S. Eldredge (1816–1888), member of the First Seven Presidents of the Seventy in the Church of Jesus Christ of Latter Day Saints (1854–1888)
- Jane Eldredge (born 1944), American politician from Kansas
- John Eldredge, an American author, counselor, and lecturer of Christianity
- John Eldredge (actor) (1904–1961), American actor
- Hezekiah Eldredge (1795–1845), American architect
- Laurence Howard Eldredge (1902–1982), American lawyer and educator
- Leigh-Anne Eldredge (born 1964), American tennis player
- Nathaniel B. Eldredge (1813–1893), American politician from Michigan
- Niles Eldredge (born 1943), an American paleontologist
- Todd Eldredge (born 1971), an American figure skater
- W. Jay Eldredge (1913–2002), general superintendent of the Young Men's Mutual Improvement Association (1969–1972)
- Zoeth Skinner Eldredge (1846–1915), American banker and historian

== Places ==
- West Cape May, New Jersey, formerly known as Eldredge

== See also ==
- Eldridge (disambiguation)
