= Ralph Fitch =

English merchant and writer

- Born: 1550; Derby
- Died: October 4, 1611 (aged 60–61); London, England
- Other name: Ralph Fytch
- Occupations: Merchant, Explorer
- Known for: Traveled via the Levant and Mesopotamia to India then Burma and Malacca (in Malaysia) (1583–1591)

Ralph Fitch (1550 – 1611) was a gentleman, a merchant of London and one of the earliest British travellers and merchants to visit Mesopotamia, the Persian Gulf, Indian Ocean, South Asia, and Southeast Asia including the court of Mughal emperor Akbar the Great. At first he was no chronicler but he did eventually write descriptions of the Southeast Asia he saw in 1583–1591, and upon his return to England, in 1591, became a valuable consultant for the English East India Company.

== Early life and Family ==
=== Family ===
Fitch's place of birth has long been a mystery but recent research indicates that he was most likely born in All Saints' parish, Derby.

Ralph Fitch is related to two notable men who would hold distinguished posts in the British-India Empire: Lieutenant-General Albert Fytche (1820-1892) and William Fytche (1716-1752).

=== Early career ===
The first known documentary reference to him is in the archives of the Worshipful Company of Leathersellers, of which he was a Freeman and from which Company he received a loan of £50 for two years, 1575–1577.

== Career Travelling ==
In February 1583, he embarked in the Tyger for Tripoli (the seaport of Aleppo) in Syria, together with merchants John Newberry and John Eldred, a jeweller named William Leedes and a painter, James Story, all financed by the Levant Company. This was the latest in a series of English attempts to penetrate the trade of the Indian Ocean and the Far East, going back to Anthony Jenkinson's travels in Central Asia in the 1550s. Fitch and his comrades reached the seaport of Aleppo in late April of 1583, then from Aleppo, they reached the Euphrates, descended the river from Bir to Fallujah (Iraq), crossed southern Mesopotamia to Baghdad, and dropped down the Tigris to Basra (May to July 1583). Here Eldred stayed behind to trade, while Fitch and the others sailed down the Persian Gulf to the Portuguese fortress and trading station at Ormuz, where they were promptly arrested as spies on the 9th of September (at Venetian instigation, they claimed, as the Venetians resented the 16th-century Portuguese commercial monopoly in the Indian Ocean that called an end to centuries of Venetian, Genoese and Pisan – plus Catalan – dealings with Arab middlemen, down from the Middle Ages) and sent as prisoners to the viceroy of Portuguese Goa and Damaon (September to October).

On the 5th November 1583, they came upon the city of Diu, the strongest town belonging to Portugal in this area, while being transported as prisoners to Goa. On their transportation as captives, Fitch and his companions also passed through the cities and towns of Daman, Basaim, Tana, and the trading hub of Chaul, which they arrived at on November 10. They then ultimately arrived at their destination of Portuguese Goa and continued their imprisoned on November 29, 1583. While in Goa, Fitch wrote a description of the Hindu people and customs, including cow worship and the practice of sati in a letter he sent back to London.

Through the sureties procured by two Jesuits (one being Thomas Stevens, formerly of New College, Oxford, the first Englishman known to have reached India by the Cape route in 1579), Fitch and his comrades regained their liberty on the 22nd of December 1583.

Story chose to join the Jesuits, and the others managed to escape from Goa (April 1584). They travelled through the heart of India and arrived in Fatehpur Sīkrito, close to Agra, in north-central India, where the court of the Great Mogul Akbar resided. The jeweller Leedes obtained a remunerative post with Akbar while Fitch continued his journey of exploration. Fitch did the first leg of that journey, from Agra to Allahabad, by joining a convoy "of one hundred and fourscore boates laden with Salt, Opium, Hinge (asafoetida), Lead, Carpets and diverse other commodities" going "downe the river jumna (Yamuna)". He reached Allahabad sometime in November 1585, when work on Akbar's great Fort at Allahabad was nearing completion. In September 1585, Newberry decided to begin his return journey overland via Lahore. He disappeared, presumably being robbed and murdered, in the Punjab.

Fitch went on, descending the Jumna and the Ganges. He explored Allahabad, Benares, Patna, Bengal, Kuch Behar, Hughli, Chittagong, Bacola, and Serrepore (1585–1586). Along this route, Fitch’s travels took him to the base of the Himalaya Mountain range, where he was possibly exposed to Tibetan trading practices. Learning of these trading practices would have interested Fitch, as he came from an economic background, and later in life would be involved with the East India Trading Company.

His appreciating words about the Indian muslin:

In 1586 Ralph Fitch remarked that in Sonargaon, just fifteen miles east of Dhaka, there is the best and finest cloth made of cotton that is in all India.

— Ralph Fitch

He departed Serrepore on the 28th of November 1586, and pushed on by sea and rivers to his destination of Pegu. In this area he visited the Rangoon area, ascended the Irrawaddy some distance, acquired a remarkable acquaintance with inland Pegu, leaving a detailed description of the city. On his route to Pegu, sailing down the river Ganges, Fitch visited the towns of Cosmin, Medon, and Dela, all described in detail. From Dela he went to Cirion, then to Macao, and then arrived in the city of Pegu. Fitch then reached the Tai of Shan states and the Tai kingdom of Lanna (December 1586 and January 1587).

Fitch left Pegu on the 10th of January 1588, and on the 8th of February he arrived in Portuguese Malacca, another of Portugal's great fortresses and the gateway to the Far East, but found the security too strict to get passage into the China Sea. Despite his limitation via security, Fitch learned much about trade in China in his time in Malacca, knowledge that would prove useful in his future councillor roles.

On the 29th of March 1588, Fitch left from Malacca back to Pegu, where he resided until September 17 when he left for Cosmin. He departed Cosmin and in November arrived in Bengala but he had no choice but to wait for passage in Bengala to his destination of Cochin, he found passage on February 3, 1589. On the 6th of March, Fitch and the other passengers arrived in Ceylon, instead of Cochin, so Fitch had to find another way to get to Cochin as it was time to begin his journey home.

Fitch sailed from Ceylon on the 11th of March 1589, to Bengal; then round the Indian coast, along the Cape of Comori. Then, touching at Portuguese Cochin, modern day Kochi, on the 22nd of March, he wrote a detailed description. Fitch stayed in Cochin for eight months, departing on November 2. He then journeyed to Goa, staying there for three days, then departed to Chaul then Ormuz, waiting in Ormuz for passage to Balsara for another fifty days. Next he travelled up the Persian Gulf to Basra and up the Tigris to Mosul (Nineveh); finally via Tirfa, Bir on the Euphrates. From Bir Fitch came to Aleppo then Tripolis, where he caught a ship travelling back to London.

Fitch was appointed the Levant Company's Consul in Aleppo and Tripoli, to the Mediterranean.

He arrived back in London on 29 April 1591, eight years after he had left. He resumed his involvement with the Leathersellers' Company, becoming a Liveryman in 1599, serving as Warden in 1607 and joining the company's Court of Assistants in 1608.

== End of Life ==
Since no news of him had reached his family and friends in the time of his journey, he had been presumed dead after seven years and his will had been proved. There is no evidence he ever married and the main beneficiaries of his final will when he died on October 4 in 1611 were eight nieces and two nephews.

== Impact and legacy ==
- Fitch ranks among the most remarkable of Elizabethan adventurers.
- His experience was greatly valued by the founders of the English East India Company, including another of Elizabeth's adventurers, Sir James Lancaster, who consulted him on Indian affairs: "All London was talking about the epoch-making journey which Ralph Fitch had made from Aleppo to India and back, and this stimulated interest in a new charter for the Levant merchants..."
- Fitch's journey is referred to indirectly by William Shakespeare in Act 1, Scene 3, Line 7 of Macbeth (circa 1606), where the First Witch cackles about a sailor's wife: "Her husband's to Aleppo gone, master of the Tyger."

== Works ==
- Aanmerklyke Reys van Ralph Fitch, Koopman te Londen, Gedaan van Anno 1583 tot 1591, (1706), Leyden, Van der Aa (in Dutch)
- Ralph Fitch, England's Pioneer To India And Burma: His Companions And Contemporaries, (1899), John Horton Ryley, ISBN 978-1104443993
- Ralph Fitch, Elizabethan in the Indies, (1972), Michael Edwardes, Faber & Faber, ISBN 057110133X.

== See also ==
- Chronology of European exploration of Asia
- John Mildenhall
