= Hardtner, Kansas =

City in Kiowa County, Kansas

- City
- Location within Barber County and Kansas

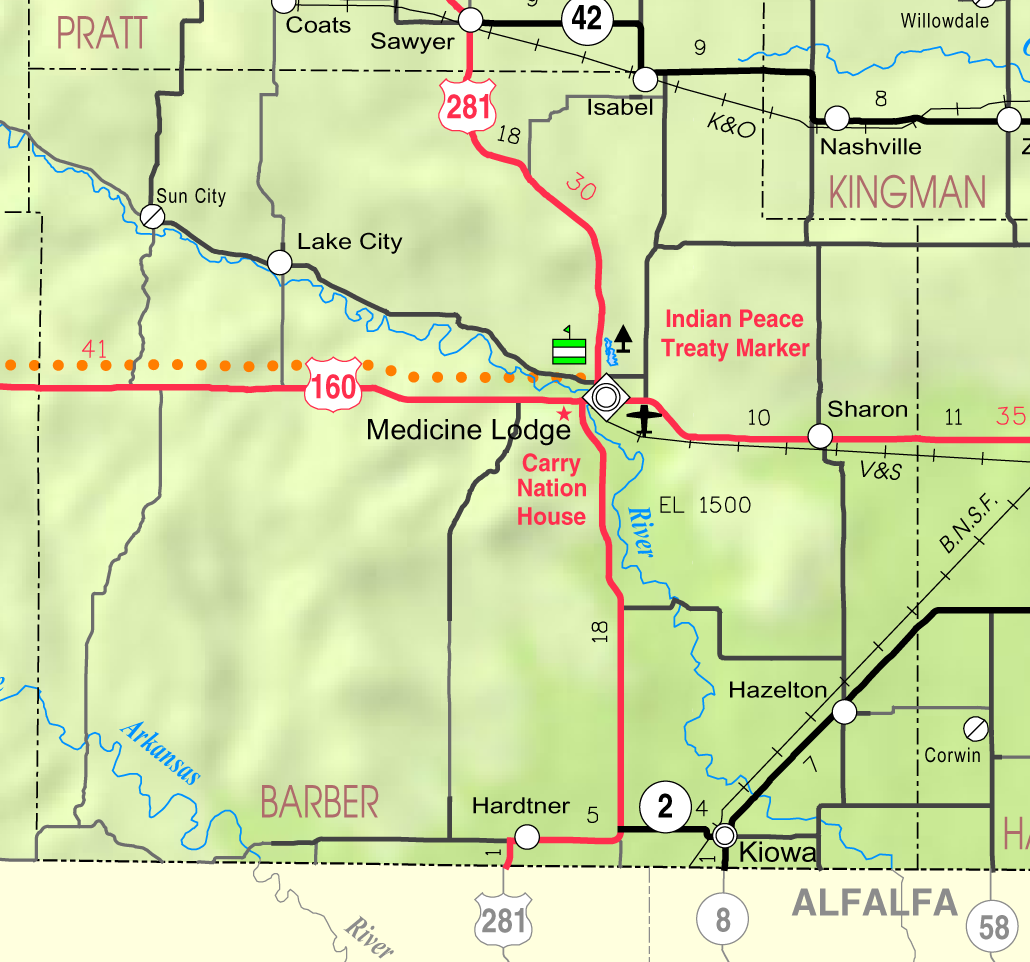
- KDOT map of Barber County (legend)
- Coordinates: 37°00′52″N 98°38′57″W
- Country: United States
- State: Kansas
- County: Barber
- Township: Elwood
- Founded: 1887
- Incorporated: 1911
- Named for: John Hardtner

Area
  - Total: 0.27 sq mi (0.71 km^{2})
  - Land: 0.27 sq mi (0.71 km^{2})
  - Water: 0 sq mi (0.00 km^{2})
- Elevation: 1,427 ft (435 m)

Population (2020)
  - Total: 167
  - Density: 610/sq mi (240/km^{2})
- Time zone: UTC-6 (CST)
  - Summer (DST): UTC-5 (CDT)
- ZIP Code: 67057
- Area code: 620
- FIPS code: 20-30000
- GNIS ID: 2394296
- Website: cityofhardtner.com

Hardtner is a city in Elwood Township, Barber County, Kansas, United States. As of the 2020 census, the population of the city was 167. It is located one mile north of the Kansas / Oklahoma state border.

== History ==
Hardtner was founded in 1887. It was named for Dr. John Hardtner, a landowner.

The first post office in Hardtner was established in July 1887.

By 1908 the townspeople had realized that they would need a railroad line to the outside world in order to survive. The town's founder Jacob Achenbach, helped set up a company to build a line east to Kiowa. The line would have to cross the Santa Fe's tracks to link with the Missouri Pacific, the planned connection for Hardtner's line. The Santa Fe's Superintendent was not about to stand for that, so he had his private car block the spot where the lines would cross. A local got word to him that the Hardtner people had about 45 cowboys ready to "riddle his car with bullets" The Superintendent moved his car, and the line was completed.

On June 2, 1929, an F2 tornado struck Hardtner, causing minor damage. The tornado tracked 12.2 miles and was notable since it moved very slowly, yielding some of the highest quality photographs of a tornado to that date.

== Geography ==
According to the United States Census Bureau, the city has a total area of 0.30 square miles (0.78 km^{2}), all land.

=== Climate ===
The climate in this area is characterized by hot, humid summers and generally mild to cool winters. According to the Köppen Climate Classification system, Hardtner has a humid subtropical climate, abbreviated "Cfa" on climate maps.

== Demographics ==
Historical population
Census	Pop.	Note	%±
1920	385		—
1930	341		−11.4%
1940	313		−8.2%
1950	373		19.2%
1960	372		−0.3%
1970	300		−19.4%
1980	336		12.0%
1990	198		−41.1%
2000	199		0.5%
2010	172		−13.6%
2020	167		−2.9%
U.S. Decennial Census

=== 2020 census ===
The 2020 United States census counted 167 people, 79 households, and 51 families in Hardtner. The population density was 607.3 per square mile (234.5/km^{2}). There were 101 housing units at an average density of 367.3 per square mile (141.8/km^{2}). The racial makeup was 91.02% (152) white or European American (91.02% non-Hispanic white), 0.6% (1) black or African-American, 0.0% (0) Native American or Alaska Native, 0.6% (1) Asian, 0.0% (0) Pacific Islander or Native Hawaiian, 1.8% (3) from other races, and 5.99% (10) from two or more races. Hispanic or Latino of any race was 2.4% (4) of the population.

Of the 79 households, 25.3% had children under the age of 18; 49.4% were married couples living together; 13.9% had a female householder with no spouse or partner present. 26.6% of households consisted of individuals and 17.7% had someone living alone who was 65 years of age or older. The average household size was 2.4 and the average family size was 3.2. The percent of those with a bachelor's degree or higher was estimated to be 13.2% of the population.

19.2% of the population was under the age of 18, 5.4% from 18 to 24, 25.1% from 25 to 44, 21.0% from 45 to 64, and 29.3% who were 65 years of age or older. The median age was 45.5 years. For every 100 females, there were 75.8 males. For every 100 females ages 18 and older, there were 84.9 males.

The 2016–2020 5-year American Community Survey estimates show that the median household income was $41,406 (with a margin of error of +/- $5,512) and the median family income was $58,750 (+/- $15,095). Males had a median income of $38,281 (+/- $7,734) versus $28,750 (+/- $7,260) for females. The median income for those above 16 years old was $33,750 (+/- $6,955). Approximately, 11.3% of families and 11.5% of the population were below the poverty line, including 5.7% of those under the age of 18 and 4.9% of those ages 65 or over.

=== 2010 census ===
As of the census of 2010, there were 172 people, 85 households, and 44 families residing in the city. The population density was 573.3 inhabitants per square mile (221.4/km^{2}). There were 123 housing units at an average density of 410.0 per square mile (158.3/km^{2}). The racial makeup of the city was 95.9% White, 0.6% Native American, 0.6% Asian, and 2.9% from two or more races. Hispanic or Latino of any race were 1.7% of the population.

There were 85 households, of which 17.6% had children under the age of 18 living with them, 45.9% were married couples living together, 3.5% had a female householder with no husband present, 2.4% had a male householder with no wife present, and 48.2% were non-families. 43.5% of all households were made up of individuals, and 24.7% had someone living alone who was 65 years of age or older. The average household size was 2.02 and the average family size was 2.84.

The median age in the city was 51 years. 19.2% of residents were under the age of 18; 1.1% were between the ages of 18 and 24; 19.2% were from 25 to 44; 36.7% were from 45 to 64; and 23.8% were 65 years of age or older. The gender makeup of the city was 52.3% male and 47.7% female.

== Education ==
Hardtner is served by South Barber USD 255 public school district.

Hardtner High School was closed through school unification. The Hardtner High School mascot was Tornadoes.

== Gallery ==
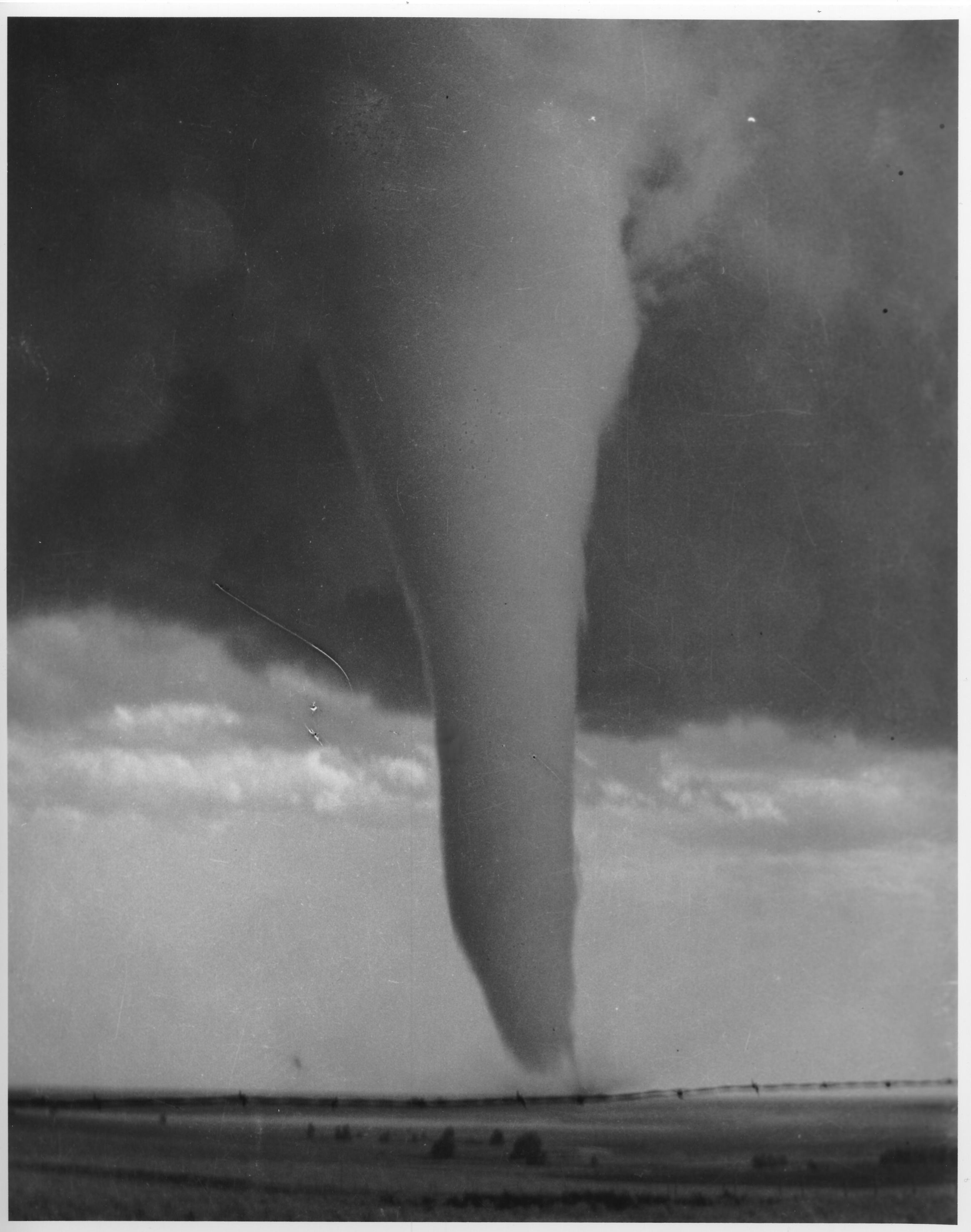
June 2, 1929 tornado

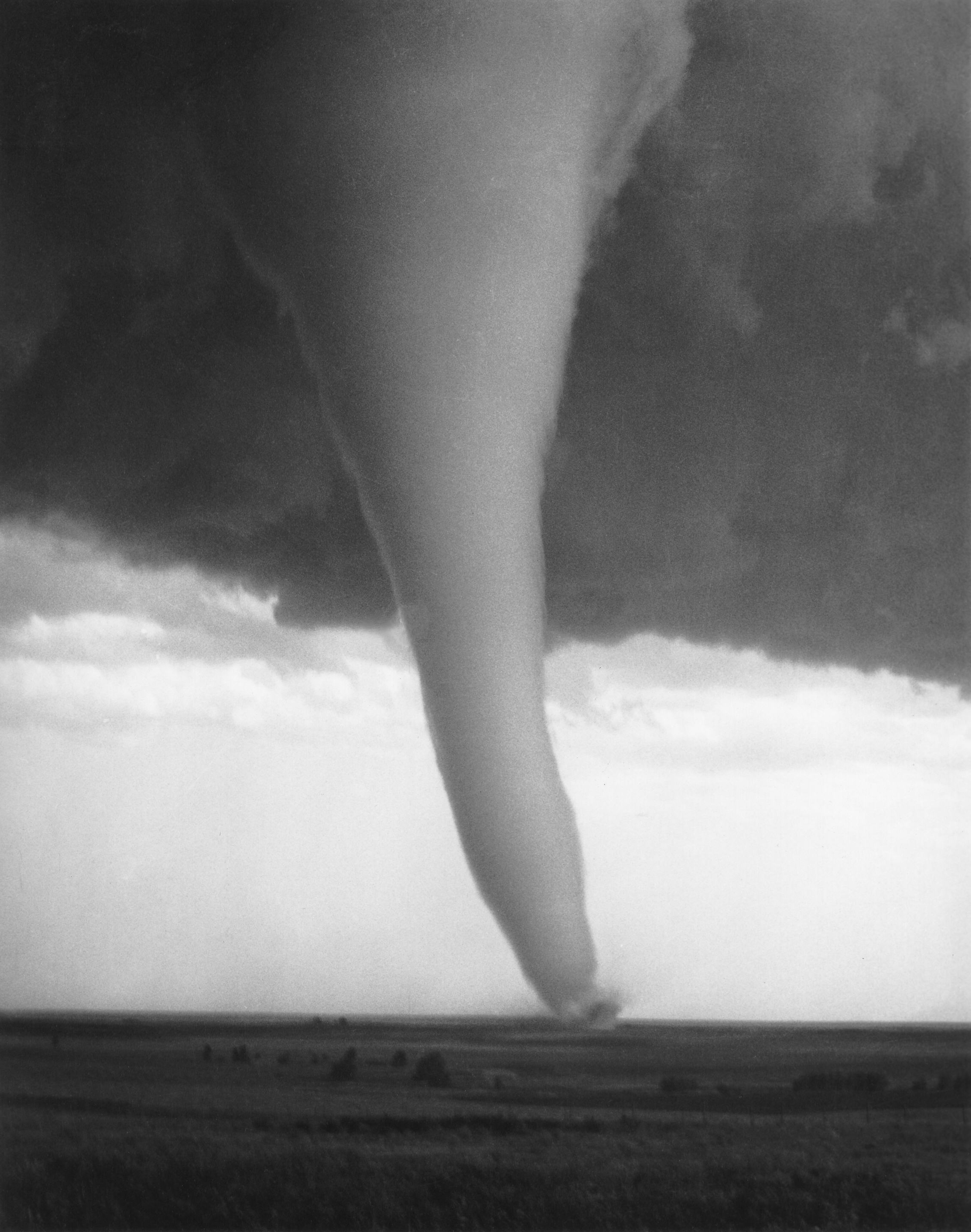
June 2, 1929 tornado
