= Graeme Aldred =

English footballer

Personal information
- Full name: Graeme Aldred
- Date of birth: 11 September 1966
- Place of birth: Ferryhill, England
- Date of death: 22 February 1987 (aged 20)
- Place of death: Newcastle upon Tyne, England
- Position: Right back

Youth career
- 19??–1984: Newcastle United

Senior career*
Years	Team	Apps	(Gls)
1984–1986	Darlington	44	(0)
1986	Barrow	7	(0)
1986–1987	Whitley Bay		
- * Club domestic league appearances and goals

Graeme Aldred (11 September 1966 – 22 February 1987) was an English footballer who made 44 appearances in the Football League playing as a right back for Darlington in the 1980s. He began his career as a trainee with Newcastle United, and also played non-league football for clubs including Barrow and Whitley Bay.

== Life and career ==
Aldred was born in Ferryhill, County Durham, and represented his county schools at under-15 and under-19 level. He began his football career with Newcastle United, but never broke through to the first team, and moved on to Darlington of the Fourth Division in September 1984.

He made his debut in the Football League in a goalless draw away to Blackpool on 15 September 1984, and went on to appear in 28 league matches, two-thirds of which were in the starting eleven, as Darlington finished third and were promoted to the Third Division. He also played in the 1984–85 FA Cup run during which Darlington eliminated near neighbours Middlesbrough in what was voted the greatest match seen at their Feethams ground. Aldred began the 1985–86 season in the team, but lost his place when Chris Evans arrived in October. He finished the season with 44 league appearances in total, 57 in all competitions.

Aldred left Darlington at the end of the season, and began 1986–87 with Northern Premier League club Barrow. By December he was playing in the Northern League for Whitley Bay.

In February 1987, the 20-year-old Aldred was a passenger in a friend's car when it went out of control. He was thrown from the car, and died of his injuries two days later in Newcastle General Hospital.
