= Ealdred =

Ealdred may refer to:

- Ealdred of Hwicce, 8th-century king of Hwicce
- Ealdred I of Bamburgh, 10th-century ruler of Bamburgh
- Ealdred (archbishop of York), 11th-century English ecclesiastic
- Ealdred II of Bamburgh, 11th-century ruler of Bamburgh

== See also ==
- Aldred
- Eadred (given name)
- Ealdgyth
- Eldred
