= Charles Eldredge =

Charles Eldredge may refer to:

- Charles A. Eldredge, American politician
- Charles C. Eldredge, American art historian

== See also ==
- Charles Eldridge, American actor
- Charles W. Eldridge, Massachusetts businessman and politician
