= Eldred baronets =

Extinct baronetcy in the Baronetage of England

The Eldred Baronetcy, of Saxham Magna in the County of Suffolk, was a title in the Baronetage of England. It was created on 29 January 1642 for Revett Eldred, the son of the traveller and merchant John Eldred. The title became extinct on Eldred's death in circa 1653.

== Eldred baronets, of Saxham Magna (1642) ==
- Sir Revett Eldred, 1st Baronet (died c. 1653)
