= H. Wentworth Eldredge =

American sociologist and spy

H. Wenthworth Eldredge
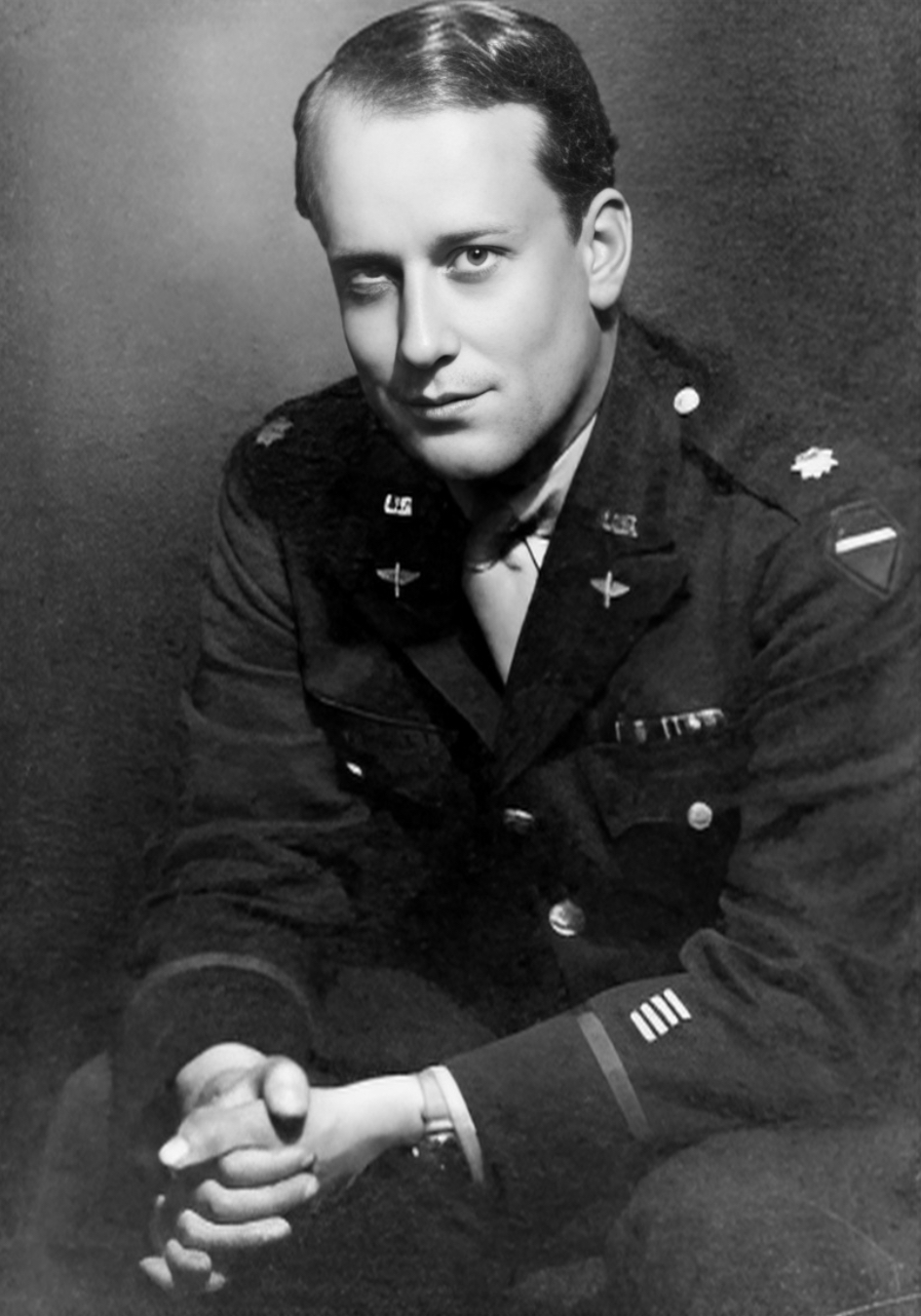
- Born: Hanford Wentworth Eldredge; October 16, 1906; Brooklyn, New York, US
- Died: February 17, 1991 (aged 84); Hanover, New Hampshire, US
- Occupation: University professor of Sociology
- Spouse: Diana Joan Younger

Academic background
- Education: Dartmouth College
- Alma mater: Yale University

Academic work
- Discipline: Sociologist
- Sub-discipline: Urban Planning
- Military career
- Allegiance: United States
- Branch: United States Air Force
- Service years: 1942-1945
- Rank: Major
- Unit: Office of Strategic Services
- Conflicts: Overlord

H. Wenthworth Eldredge or H.W. Wentworth (18 October 1909 – 17 February 1991) was an American professor of sociology specializing in urban planning who also served as an American spy during World War II, where he helped divert Nazi attention from the pending invasion of Normandy ("Operation Overlord").

== Background ==
Hanford Wentworth Eldredge was born on October 16, 1909, in Brooklyn, New York. His parents were Hanford W. Eldredge and Taylor Eldredge. In 1931, Eldredge received a BA from Dartmouth College; in 1935, he received a doctorate from Yale University.

== Career ==
=== Early academic ===
In 1935, upon receiving his doctorate, Eldredge joined Dartmouth College as an instructor in sociology. In 1939, he became assistant professor.

=== Military career ===
In 1942, Eldredge joined the United States Air Force where he remained to the end of World War II. In 1943, he transferred to London. Originally, he was to record the history of the 8th Air Force. He then became an intelligence officer and helped deceive the Nazis by diverting their attention away from the pending invasion of Normadny ("Operation Overlord").

Later, Eldredge provided government service as:

- 1956: Consultant in the Executive Office of the President
- 1955-1960: Guest lecturer to the North Atlantic Treaty Organization's Defense College in Paris
- 1960: Guest lecturer at the Institut des hautes études de défense nationale in Paris
- 1961: Guest lecturer at the Führungsakademie der Bundeswehr (FüAkBw) / United States Air Force Academy
- 1962: Guest lecturer at the Ecole de Guerre in Brussels

=== Later academic ===
In 1945, Eldredge resumed his position as an assistant professor at Dartmouth. In 1949, he became a full professor at Dartmouth through 1974.

Eldredge chaired several departments and programs:

- 1953-1957: Sociology department
- 1959-1962: International Relations program
- 1959-1965: City Planning and Urban Studies program
- 1965-1968: Sociology department

Eldredge was visiting professor or guest lecturer at the Royal Architectural Association London, Yale University, University of Pennsylvania, University of North Carolina, Massachusetts Institute of Technology, Cornell University, and Harvard University.

In 1974, Eldreged retired.

== Personal life and death ==
On April 21, 1947, Eldredge married Diana Joan Younger, the second daughter of Sir William Robert Younger, 2nd Baronet, and they had two sons.

Eldredge was a member of the: American Sociological Society, American Society Planning Officials (now American Planning Association) and its certifying body American Institute of Certified Planners, American Association of University Professors, and Beta Theta Pi.

H. Wentworth Eldredge died age 81 on February 21, 1991, of pneumonia in Hanover, New Hampshire.

== Legacy ==
The University of New Hampshire houses Eldredge's papers.

The National Park Service of the United States Department of the Interior has received an application to put the Wentworth and Diana Eldredge House (AKA Tarn House) in Windsor County, Vermont, on the National Register of Historic Places.

Eldrege and his wife donated the painting "Mother and Son" by Haitian painter Roland Dorcely (1930–2017) to Dartmouth College's Hood Museum of Art.

== Works ==
Books:

- Culture and Society: An Introduction to Sociology (1952)
- The Second American Revolution (1964)
- Taming Megopolis (1967)
- World Capitals (1975)

Articles:

- "Enemy Aliens: Resident of This City for Twenty Years," New Haven Evening Register (1918)
- "A City Voice Crying in the Wilderness," Dartmouth Alumni Magazine (1963)
- "Reviewed Works: The Betrayal of the Poor... Reforming the Poor" Annals of the American Academy of Political and Social Science (1973)

Eldredge wrote part of an unpublished autobiography.

== See also ==
- List of spies in World War II
