= John Eldred =

English traveller and merchant

John Eldred (1552–1632) was an English traveller and merchant. His Journal of his Voyage to Tripoli and Bassora is reproduced in Richard Hakluyt's Principal Navigations of 1599.

== Early life ==
Eldred was born in 1552 at New Buckenham in Norfolk, where his father had moved from Knettishall in Suffolk. It seems probable that he went to London while still young, devoted himself to business and prospered. He was already a well-to-do merchant when 'upon Shrove Monday 1583' he 'departed out of London in the ship called the Tiger, in the company of Mr. John Newbery, Mr. Ralph Fitch, and six or seven other honest merchants.'

== Voyage ==
On 1 May they arrived at Tripoli in Syria, and after staying there for a fortnight went on to Aleppo, and thence to Bir on the Euphrates. At Bir they took a boat down the river as far as Feludjah, where after a week's delay they hired a hundred asses to convey their merchandise to Baghdad. There they stayed for some days, and, reshipping their wares in boats on the Tigris, came at length to Bassorah. At Bassorah Eldred remained for six months engaged in the business of the journey, to such good purpose that when he and his companions departed on their return, it took seventy barks, or rather barges, to carry them and their merchandise, consisting mainly of spices; bales of cinnamon and nutmeg being more especially mentioned. These barks were tracked up the stream by fourteen men to each, and so in forty-four days arrived at Bagdad, where the adventurers provisioned for the land journey, and departed in company with many other merchants, and an enormous caravan of four thousand camels, laden with spices and other rich merchandise. After forty days' journey they arrived at Aleppo on 11 June 1584. For the next three years Eldred made Aleppo his headquarters; 'in which time,' to quote his own words, 'I made two voyages more unto Babylon (Bagdad), and returned by the way aforesaid, over the deserts of Arabia. And afterwards, as one desirous to see other parts of the country, I went from Aleppo to Antioch, which is thence sixty English miles, and from thence went down to Tripoli, where, going aboard a small vessel, I arrived at Joppa, and travelled to Rama, Lycia, Gaza, Jerusalem, Bethlehem, to the river of Jordan, and the sea or lake of Sodom, and returned to Joppa, and from thence by sea to Tripoli, of which places, because many others have published large discourses, I surcease to write.'

== Return to England and subsequent career ==
On 22 December 1587 he embarked at Tripoli for England, and 'arrived in safety here in the river of Thames with divers English merchants, 26 March 1588, in the Hercules of London, which was the richest ship of English merchants' goods that ever was known to come into this realm.' A large part of these riches appears to have belonged to Eldred.

He was now a wealthy man, and, having capital at his disposal, accumulated a large fortune. In 1597 he bought the manor of Great Saxham in Suffolk, and built a large house which came to be popularly known as 'Nutmeg Hall.' He continued, however, to reside chiefly in London, engaged in business. When the East India Company was started, he was a large subscriber, was a member of the first court of directors, and for many years took a prominent part in its affairs. He was also, during the reign of James I, a contractor and commissioner for the sale of lands, a customs farmer, and the holder of a patent for the pre-emption of tin.

== Death ==
He died at Great Saxham in 1632, and was buried there in the church on 8 December.

== Issue ==
His eldest son was born in June 1590, so that he presumably married shortly after his return from the Levant. His wife was Mary, daughter of Thomas Revett of Rishangles in Suffolk, by whom he had a large family. The firstborn son died in infancy; but the second, Revett, grew up, was made a baronet in 1641 (see Eldred baronets), and died without issue in 1653, when the estate of Great Saxham passed to the family of John Eldred, Revett's next brother. This became extinct in 1745, when the property was sold. 'Nutmeg Hall' was burnt down in 1779; the present Great Saxham Hall was built by the new proprietors in the closing years of the same century.

In the church of Great Saxham there is a monument to the memory of John Eldred erected by his son Revett; also a bust with a mural tablet bearing the inscription : —

"The Holy Land so called I have seene,
And in the Land of Babilon have beene,
But in that Land where glorious Saints doe live
My soul doth crave of Christ a roome to give."
