= Janet Eldred =

American professor and author

Janet Eldred is an American professor and author, currently the Chellgren Professor of English at the University of Kentucky, and has been largely collected by libraries worldwide.
