= Duncan Aldred =

British businessman

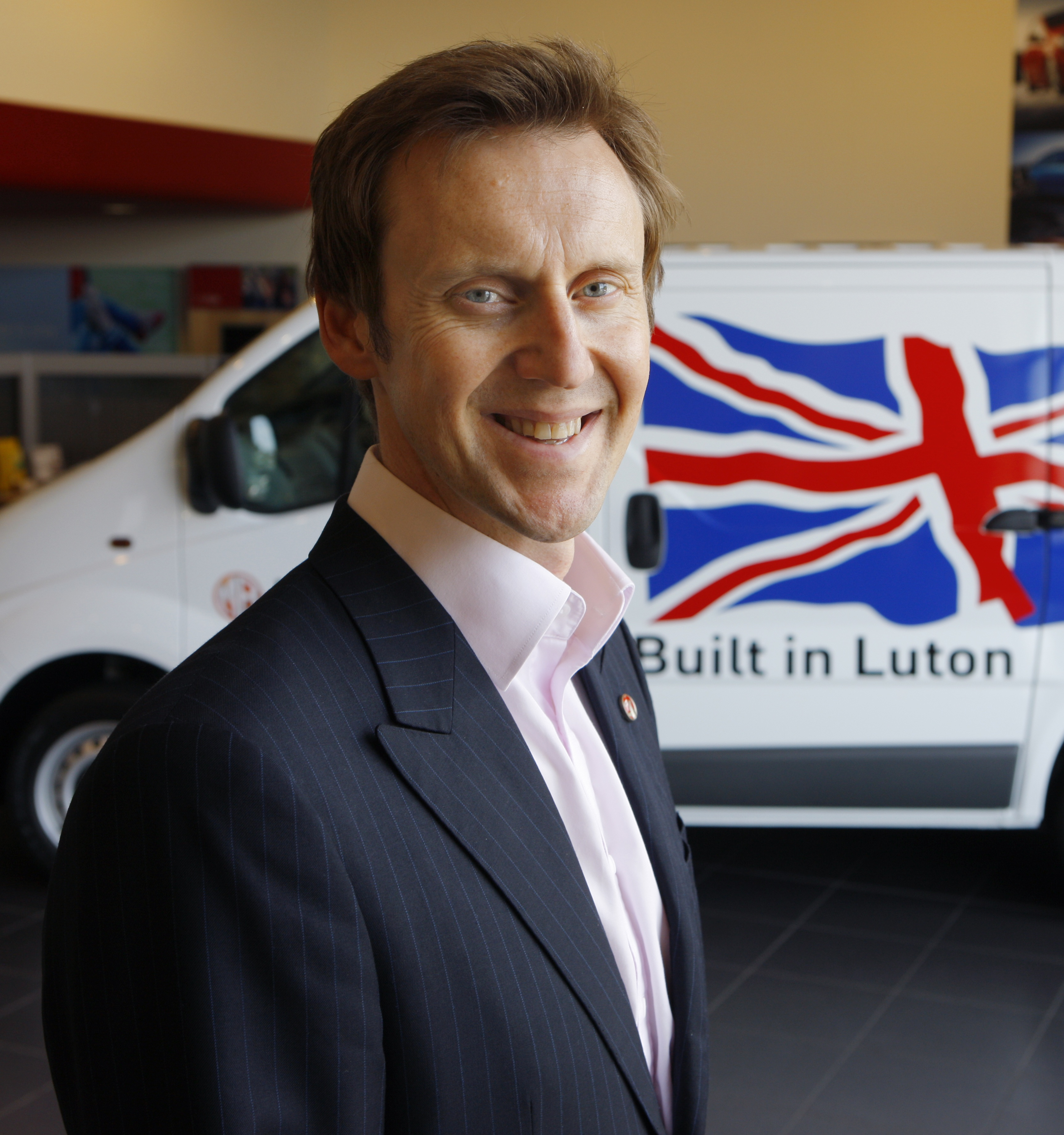
- Born: 1970 (age 55–56); Bolton
- Education: Liverpool Polytechnic
- Occupations: Vice President, sales, Buick-GMC

Duncan Aldred (born 1970) is an English business executive currently serving as the Senior Vice President and President of North America at General Motors. He previously served as Vice President of GM Commercial Growth and Operations, Global Vice President of Buick and GMC, and as Vice President of Sales, Marketing and Aftersales at Opel and Vauxhall.

Duncan was born in Bolton in 1970 and was first associated with Vauxhall as an undergraduate at the Ellesmere Port plant in 1990.

With Vauxhall sponsorship he graduated from Liverpool Polytechnic (Sir John Moores University) with a BA (Hons) in Business Studies in 1992. He worked in various positions in Vauxhall Sales and Marketing before his appointment as Vauxhall Sales Operations Director in 2002 and then Retail Sales Director in February 2004.

In July 2006 he moved to Budapest as Director, Sales, Marketing and Aftersales for GM South East Europe and in April 2009, moved to Rüsselsheim, Germany to take the role of Sales Operations Director, Opel & Chevrolet. Duncan was appointed to the role of Chairman and Managing Director, Vauxhall, in January 2010, and added the responsibilities of Global Vice President Opel and Vauxhall Sales, Service and Marketing in January 2013. In March 2014 Aldred took up the new role as Vice President of Buick-GMC sales, based in Detroit.

== See also ==
- Vauxhall
- Adam Opel AG
