= William Eldred =

English master gunner

William Eldred (1563?–1646?), was an English gunner, the master gunner of Dover Castle and author of a treatise on gunnery.

== Life ==
Eldred was born about 1563, and lived to an old age, signing as a freeholder of Dover the Kentish petition for the reformation of the liturgy in 1641. It would appear possible that he was a relation of John Eldred and of Thomas Eldred, but no identification is possible.

== Works ==
He was author of The Gunner's Glasse, wherein the diligent Practitioner may see his defects, and may from point to point reform and amend all errors that are commonly incident to unskilful gunners (1646). The book is an account of the great gun exercise as then in vogue. The dedication to the Earl of Warwick says that he had spent the greatest part of his time in Dover Castle; and that he had been a gunner for about sixty years. In the body of the work he mentions incidentally that he had served also as a gunner in the Low Countries and in Germany.
