= Eldred Glacier =

Glacier in Antarctica

- Map of King George Island

- Location within South Shetland Islands Location within Antarctica
- Location: King George Island; South Shetland Islands
- Coordinates: 61°58′00″S 58°16′00″W
- Length: 2.5 nmi (5 km; 3 mi)
- Thickness: unknown
- Terminus: east of Potts Peak
- Status: unknown

Eldred Glacier is a glacier 2.5 nautical miles (5 km) long, flowing to the north coast of King George Island immediately east of Potts Peak, in the South Shetland Islands. It was named by the UK Antarctic Place-Names Committee in 1960 for Andrew J. Eldred, Master of the sealing vessel Thomas Hunt from Stonington, Connecticut, who visited the South Shetland Islands in 1873–74, 1875–76, 1878–79 and 1879–80. During the latter season he took part in the unsuccessful search for the Charles Shearer.

== See also ==
- List of glaciers in the Antarctic
- Glaciology
