= Eldred Township =

Eldred Township may refer to the following townships in the United States:

== North Dakota ==
- Eldred Township, North Dakota

== Pennsylvania ==
- Eldred Township, Jefferson County, Pennsylvania
- Eldred Township, Lycoming County, Pennsylvania
- Eldred Township, McKean County, Pennsylvania
- Eldred Township, Monroe County, Pennsylvania
- Eldred Township, Schuylkill County, Pennsylvania
- Eldred Township, Warren County, Pennsylvania
