= David Holt (psychotherapist) =

British psychotherapist (1926–2002)

- Born: David Holt; 9 February 1926; Liverpool, England
- Died: 31 March 2002 (aged 76); Oxford, England

David Holt (9 February 1926 – 31 March 2002) was a British psychotherapist based in London and then Oxford who trained in the tradition of Analytical psychology developed by Carl Jung. As an analyst he broadened his approach to include theatre (especially William Shakespeare), time, history, politics and economics (Karl Marx), psychosis, metaphysics, alchemy and the relationship between Analytical psychology and religion.

== Life and career ==
=== Background and education ===
David Holt, the son of Lawrence Durning Holt, was born in Liverpool in 1926 into a Liverpool shipping family. After service during World War II, on Atlantic and Russian convoys in 1944 and in the Pacific in 1945, he went up to Balliol College, Oxford, to read modern history, where he was influenced by Christopher Hill and R. G. Collingwood. He chose Augustine of Hippo as his special subject.

=== Career ===
After Oxford, Holt worked for some time in publishing and then went to the C. G. Jung Institute in Zürich to train as an analyst, graduating in 1966. His thesis, "Persona and Actor", brought together his interests in Analytical psychology, history and theatre. Thereafter he was in private practice as an analyst until his death.

As a teacher and supervisor at the Westminster Pastoral Foundation from 1971 to 1982, he introduced a course on counselling and ontology. He also led the Jung and hermeneutics weekends at Hawkwood College near Stroud, Gloucestershire, between 1978 and 1991. These incorporated group performance of stories from the Bible, mythology and William Shakespeare. His published work on the subject is Theatre and Behaviour: Hawkwood Papers 1979 – 1986.

For many years Holt was involved with the Guild of Pastoral Psychology contributing talks and papers and as its chair for 1970. He was a founder member of Oxford Psychotherapy Society in 1985. He was also chair of the C. G. Jung Analytical Psychology Club in London between 1988 and 1992.

His book The Clermont Story: arguing christian responsability [sic] is a life-long amplification of a dream during the night of 27 February 1948.

He died in Oxford on Easter Day 2002. His funeral included an address, "Keeping Time", which he had written for the occasion.

Since 2009 an annual David Holt Prize is awarded at the University of Essex where his library is now housed in the special collections section of the Albert Sloman Library.

=== Influence ===
The intensity and relevance of Holt's thought is well recognised by Jungians and Post-Jungians. In his introduction to Holt's The Psychology of Carl Jung: Essays in Application and Deconstruction, James L Jarrett refers to the range of Holt's psychological interests, to the ways that his essays strike deeply "into what Jung loved to call the rhizome of the psyche", to his combination of geniality and toughness and he concludes his introduction by saying, "I feel from his uninterrupted presence in his writing that he must be wholly there to his clients, a partner in the enquiry, a fellow witness, a sharer in the unending negotiation of meaning, an enricher of the shared time."

James Hillman begins a discussion of the relevance of alchemy to contemporary therapy by referring to Holt's paper Jung and Marx in Spring 1973 and writes, "There Holt shows that Jung imagined his work to be theoretically and historically substantiated by alchemy ... As Holt indicates, it is to alchemy that we must turn to gain the proper placing of Jung's entire endeavour."

Stanton Marlan cites Holt's article Alchemy: Jung and the historians of science in Harvest as providing "a reference guide to the historical literature for those who have an interest in Jung's work in relation to the history of science and to scientific ideas."

These references indicate how Holt's thinking has been a catalyst for other writers: a further example is an article in which Paul Bishop discusses Goethe, Nietzsche and Jung in relation to alchemy and the work on the self, taking his cue from Holt's discussion of Jung and Marx in relation to alchemy, Christianity and the work against nature.

Claudette Kulkami refers to Holt's essay Jung and Hermeneutics: The Hidden Reality and comments that it is an interesting meditation that demonstrates "how Ricoeur's hermeneutics can be of help in reading Jung".

Sonu Shamdasani acknowledges Holt's detailed work on correcting errors in Hull's translation of one of Jung's essays.

Holt's work on speaking and listening and on the nature of the therapeutic relationship is also well caught in Roger Brooke's classic text Jung and Phenomenology: "David Holt (1975) sees 'the withdrawal of projections' ... as a shift from speaking to listening ... from habitually speaking at the world in terms of one's egoic needs and anxieties to listening to the things and people that speak (whisper, cry, shout) the calls and meanings of one's life. The shift from speaking to listening realises one's capacity for faith, which, as Holt puts it, 'is the activity which lets the world be, which allows Presence to sound'."

The influence of Holt's thinking can also be seen in the articles Remembering David Holt in the Oxford Psychotherapy Society in 2002 and in the papers given to the Guild of Pastoral Psychology in 2011 by Michael Whan and Jessica Rose

=== Family ===
In 1955. Holt married Susan Sharpe. Their daughter Sarah Julia was born in 1957 and son Nathanael Oliver in 1959. The marriage was dissolved in 1966 and he subsequently married Edith Polten. Their son Jonathan was born in 1970.

== Publications ==
=== Books ===
- Theatre and Behaviour: Hawkwood Papers 1979 – 1986 (1987). ISBN 0-9512174-0-2
- The Psychology of Carl Jung: Essays in Application and Deconstruction (1992) Edwin Mellen Press. ISBN 0-7734-9481-2
- Psyche in the Operating Theatre (1998). Printed by Parchment (Oxford) Ltd.
- Eventful Responsability [sic]: fifty years of dreaming remembered (1999) Axxent Ltd. ISBN 0-9512174-1-0
- The Clermont Story: arguing christian responsability [sic] (2001) Validthod Press. ISBN 0-9512174-2-9

=== Papers of the Guild of Pastoral Psychology ===
- Hypokrites and Analyst (1968) No. 145
- Idolatry and Work in Psychology (1970) No. 155
- Jung and the Third Person (1981) No. 205
- Sacred Hunger: Exponential Growth and the Bible (1999) No. 267
