= John William Aldred =

- Born: 26 August 1884; Little Hulton, Lancashire, England
- Died: 7 June 1967 (aged 82); Chester, England
- Military career
- Allegiance: United Kingdom
- Branch: Royal Flying Corps
- Rank: Captain
- Units: No. 5 Squadron RFC; No. 70 Squadron RAF; No. 3 Squadron RAF
- Awards: Military Cross and Bar
- Other work: Chartered accountant

Captain John William Aldred MC & Bar (26 August 1884 – 7 June 1967) was an English World War I flying ace credited with eight aerial victories. He began military service in World War I as an infantryman and transferred to flight duty as an observer. After scoring two aerial victories and winning the Military Cross, he qualified as a fighter pilot, scored six more triumphs, and earned a Bar to his MC in lieu of a second award.

== Early life ==
John William Aldred was born to John and Louisa Aldred on 26 August 1884 in Little Hulton, Lancashire, England. He was baptised Presbyterian. He was educated at Manchester Grammar School. In 1907, he qualified as a chartered accountant and in 1910 moved to the United States. After the First World War began, he returned to the United Kingdom in 1915 to began his military career in the South Lancashire Regiment, though relatively old for infantry duty.

== World War I ==
On 29 November 1915, Aldred was commissioned as a second lieutenant in the South Lancashire Regiment. Aldred transferred to the General List of the Royal Flying Corps as an aerial observer effective 30 August 1916. While manning the observer's weaponry as a No. 5 Squadron member at 0930 hours on 16 February 1917, he set a German Albatros D.III aflame and set another down out of control. Those two victories earned him a Military Cross, which was gazetted on 26 March 1917:

For conspicuous gallantry during an aerial combat with two hostile scouts. He drove one of the hostile machines down and succeeded in driving the other hostile machine back over the enemy's lines. He displayed great courage and determination throughout.

On 30 July 1917, temporary Second Lieutenant J. W. Aldred MC was appointed a Flying Officer, indicating he had qualified as a pilot; his seniority for promotion was set at 30 August 1916. He was posted back to combat duty in France on 21 October 1917, to serve as a pilot with No. 70 Squadron. He scored three more victories while flying with them. During this stretch of time, he must have been confirmed in rank, as well as promoted to lieutenant. A transfer to 3 Squadron followed on 3 April 1918 so that he could serve as a Flight Commander. Accordingly, on 15 April 1918 Aldred was promoted from lieutenant to temporary captain, commensurate with his duties as a Flight Commander. The following month, he scored three more wins. He was once again decorated, with the Bar to the MC gazetted on 16 September 1918:

For conspicuous gallantry and devotion to duty whilst taking part in offensive patrols. During recent operations he destroyed four enemy aircraft and drove down three others out of control. He also did much successful low bombing and firing at low targets. He did splendid service.

== Between the World Wars ==
Lieutenant (acting Captain) Aldred transferred to the unemployed list of the Royal Air Force on 25 April 1919 to return to life as a civilian. He returned to the United States with his wife to work as an accountant in Yonkers, New York.

By 7 August 1923, Aldred had returned to England and was a chartered accountant for E. Noel Humphreys & Co in Chester. The London Gazette archives contain over a dozen references to his professional activities in following years, with the latest one concerning the estate of a relative who died on 9 May 1935.

== World War II and beyond ==
During World War II, he served as an air raid warden in Chester, where he continued to work as a chartered accountant until retiring in 1959.

He married Gladys Whittaker on 5 June 1919. They had two sons, Hugh Aldred and John Barry Aldred. His wife died in 1961. Aldred died at the age of 82 on 7 June 1967 in Chester, England.
