= Thomas Aldred =

Thomas Aldred may refer to:

- Tom Aldred (born 1990), English professional footballer
- Thomas Aldred (MP) (died 1562), English politician and member of Parliament, represented Kingston upon Hull
