= Elwood Township, Kansas =

Elwood Township
- Township
- Location in Barber County
- Coordinates: 37°03′42″N 098°41′21″W
- Country: United States
- State: Kansas
- County: Barber

Area
  - Total: 100.38 sq mi (259.99 km^{2})
  - Land: 100.21 sq mi (259.53 km^{2})
  - Water: 0.18 sq mi (0.46 km^{2}) 0.18%
- Elevation: 1,519 ft (463 m)

Population (2000)
  - Total: 275
  - Density: 2.8/sq mi (1.1/km^{2})
- GNIS feature ID: 0470533

Elwood Township is a township in Barber County, Kansas, United States. As of the 2000 census, its population was 275.

== Geography ==
Elwood Township covers an area of 100.38 square miles (260.0 km^{2}) and contains one incorporated settlement, Hardtner.

Cook Lake is within this township. The stream of Dry Creek runs through this township.
