= Thomas Eldred =

English merchant and mariner

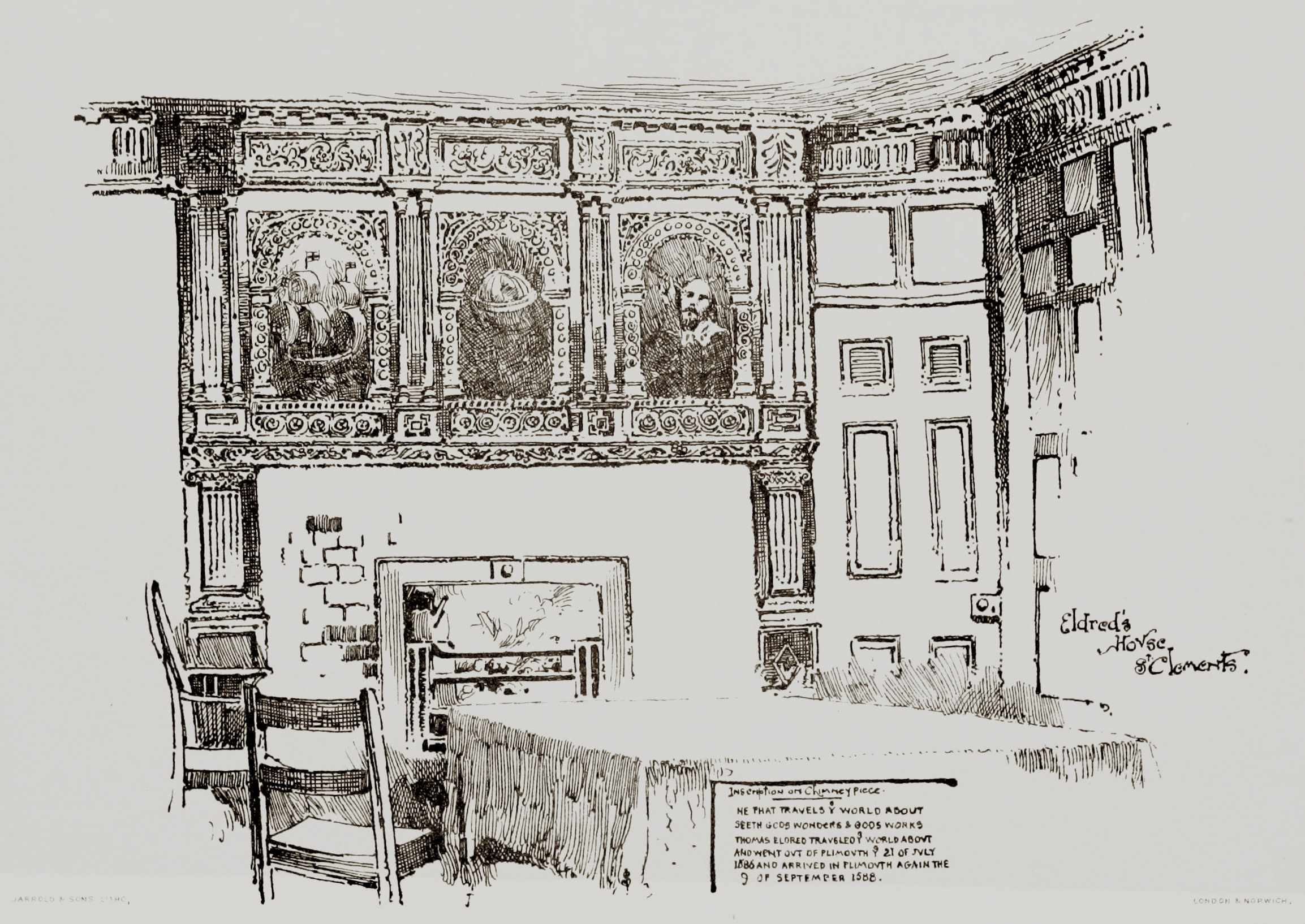
Interior of house in Fore Street, from In and About Ancient Ipswich by John Ellor Taylor and Percy Stimpson

Thomas Eldred (1561–1624) was an English merchant and mariner. He is notable for having sailed with Thomas Cavendish on the ship Desire, during the second English circumnavigation of the globe between 1586 and 1588.

He lived at 97 Fore Street, Ipswich, and was commemorated by a pub with his name, until it was removed in 2012.

He was buried in the churchyard of St Clement's Church.
