= David Eldred Holt =

- Born: 27 November 1843; Wilkinson County, Mississippi
- Died: 5 November 1925 (aged 81); Atlantic Beach, Duval County, Florida
- Occupation: Minister in the Episcopal Church
- Known for: Memoirs of his experience in the Civil War

David Eldred Holt (27 November 1843 – 5 November 1925) was an Episcopalian clergy member. He is known for a memoir that he wrote about his experiences as a soldier in the Confederate States Army during the American Civil War.
