= Baron Campbell =

Baron Campbell may refer to:

- Baron Campbell, a hereditary title held alongside Baron Stratheden.
  - John Campbell, 1st Baron Campbell (1779–1861), Lord High Chancellor of Great Britain and Lord High Chancellor of Ireland
  - William Frederick Campbell, 2nd Baron Stratheden and Campbell (1824–1893)
- Jock Campbell, Baron Campbell of Eskan (1912–1994), British businessman
- Alan Campbell, Baron Campbell of Alloway (1917–2013)
- Gordon Campbell, Baron Campbell of Croy (1921–2005)
- Menzies Campbell, Baron Campbell of Pittenweem (1941-2025), former leader of the Liberal Democrats

== See also ==
- Dale Campbell-Savours, Baron Campbell-Savours (born 1943)
- Baroness Campbell (disambiguation)
- Lord Campbell (disambiguation)
