= Lord Campbell =

Lord Campbell may refer to:

- Lord Campbell, Lordship of Parliament created in 1445, a subsidiary title of the Duke of Argyll
  - Duncan Campbell, 1st Lord Campbell (died 1453)
  - Colin Campbell, 2nd Lord Campbell (c. 1433–1493), became Earl of Argyll in 1457
- Lord Campbell of Loudoun, title created in 1601, a subsidiary title of the Earl of Loudoun
  - John Campbell, 2nd Lord Campbell of Loudoun, became Earl of Loudoun in 1633
- Lord Neill Campbell (c. 1630–1692)
- Lord Frederick Campbell (1729–1816)
- Lord William Campbell (1731–1778), Governor of South Carolina
- Lord John Campbell (1779–1861), Baron Campbell, Lord High Chancellor of Great Britain and Lord High Chancellor of Ireland, and author of Lives of the Lord Chancellors
- William Frederick Campbell, 2nd Baron Stratheden and Campbell (1824–1893)
- Lord Colin Campbell (1853–1895)
- Jock Campbell, Baron Campbell of Eskan (1912–1994), British businessman
- Alan Campbell, Baron Campbell of Alloway (1917–2013)
- Gordon Campbell, Baron Campbell of Croy (1921–2005)
- Menzies Campbell, Baron Campbell of Pittenweem (1941-2025), former leader of the Liberal Democrats

== See also ==
- Dale Campbell-Savours, Baron Campbell-Savours (born 1943)
- Baron Campbell (disambiguation)
- Baroness Campbell (disambiguation)
