= Henry Jervis-White-Jervis =

British politician and army officer (1825-1881)

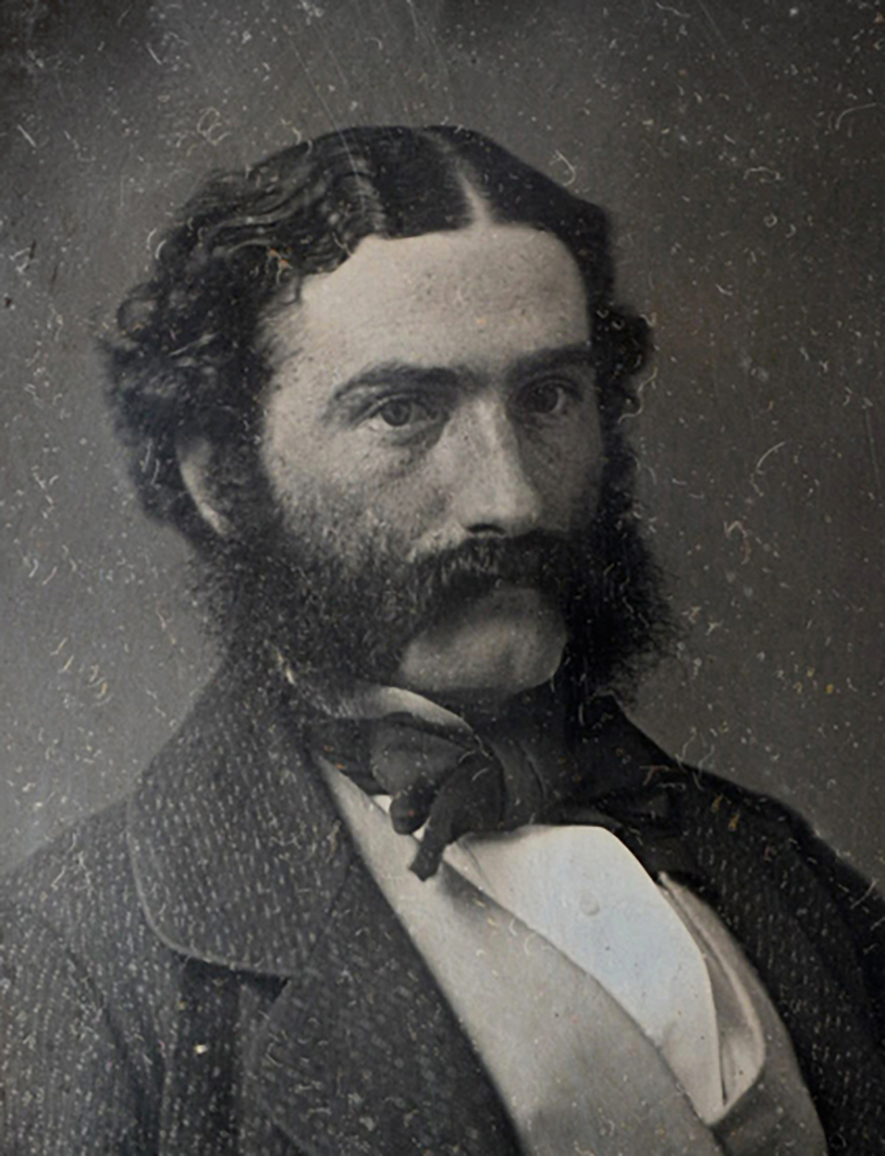
- Jervis-White-Jervis as a young man

Member of Parliament for Harwich
- In office 1859–1880 Serving with Robert John Bagshaw, William Campbell, Richard Rowley, John Kelk
- Preceded by: John Bagshaw; Robert John Bagshaw
- Succeeded by: Sir Henry Tyler

Personal details
- Born: 15 March 1825 Portobello, Edinburgh
- Died: 22 September 1881 (aged 56) Felixstowe, Suffolk
- Party: Conservative
- Spouse: Lucy Cobbold (m. 1855; died 1881)
- Parent(s): Sir Henry Jervis-White-Jervis, 2nd Baronet; Marian Campbell
- Education: Harrow School
- Alma mater: Royal Military Academy, Woolwich

Henry Jervis-White-Jervis (15 March 1825 – 22 September 1881) was a British army officer and a Conservative politician who sat in the House of Commons from 1859 to 1880.

== Early life ==
Jervis-White-Jervis was born at Portobello, Edinburgh, Scotland on 15 March 1825. He was the third son of Sir Henry Jervis-White-Jervis, 2nd Baronet (1793–1869) and his wife Marian Campbell, the eldest daughter of William Campbell of Fairfield, Ayrshire.

His paternal grandparents were Sir John Jervis-White-Jervis, 1st Baronet, and Jane Nesbitt daughter of Henry Nesbitt of Connaught, Ireland. The progenitor of the family was John White, Esq., who married Lady Margaret Seymour, settled in Ireland during the reign of King Charles II, and purchased the Bally Ellis estate in County Wexford. White's son, also named John White, married Katherine Jervis (a daughter of Sir Humphrey Jervis, Lord Mayor of Dublin). Their son, John Jervis White, took on the Jervis name as part of his inheritance and became great-grandfather of the 1st Baronet.

He was educated at Harrow School and at the Royal Military Academy, Woolwich.

== Career ==
He joined the Royal Artillery as 2nd lieutenant in December 1844. He became 1st Lieutenant in 1846 and captain in September 1853. He was employed on special service under the Board of Ordnance in the United States in 1855.

Jervis-White-Jervis stood for parliament unsuccessfully at Harwich in 1857. At a by-election in March 1859 he was elected Member of Parliament for Harwich. He remained in Parliament until 1880.

Jervis-White-Jervis continued his military career and held various appointments dealing with the armaments of the service until January 1866 when he became Brevet-Major. In December 1867 he became lieutenant-colonel. He authored several books including Manual of Field Operations, History of Corfu and of the Ionian Islands, The Enfield Rifle, and Our Engines of War.

=== Great Eastern Railway ===
In February 1863 Jervis-White-Jervis was elected deputy chairman of the Great Eastern Railway with specific responsibilities for chairing the stores and Traffic committees within that organisation. In August 1865 Jervis-White-Jervis issued an appeal raising concerns about the management of the railway. This prompted an internal investigation and in a board meeting at the end of the month, an absent Jervis-White-Jervis was replaced by William Shaw as deputy chairman. The internal investigation concluded that many of Jervis-White-Jervis's concerns were relevant and in a meeting in January the following years many of the directors were duly replaced (by members of the investigating committee). However Jervis-White-Jervis did not escape unscathed being subject to a motion of censure.

== Personal life ==
In 1855, Jervis-White-Jervis married Lucy Cobbold (1828–1916), daughter of the former Lucy Patterson and John Chevalier Cobbold, MP for Ipswich, and had several children, including:

- Aline Jervis-White-Jervis (born 1856), who married George Palmer Hope in 1879.
- Sir John Henry Jervis-White-Jervis, 4th Baronet (1857–1943), who married Margaret Frances Lockhart Campbell, a daughter of Peter Gunning John Campbell, in 1887.
- Herbert Jervis-White-Jervis (1858–1934), who married Beatrice Georgiana Ruggles-Brise, a daughter of Samuel Ruggles-Brise, MP for East Essex, and Marianne Weyland Bowyer-Smith (daughter of Sir Edward Bowyer-Smijth, 10th Baronet), in 1893.
- Sir Henry Felix Jervis-White-Jervis, 5th Baronet (1859–1947), who married Sarah Ann Danbrook, a daughter of James Danbrook, in 1885.
- Lucy Frances Jervis-White-Jervis (1860–1920), who married Dr. George Haynes Hetherington in 1882.
- Ethel Rosa Jervis-White-Jervis (1862–1886), who died unmarried.

Jervis-White-Jervis died at Felixstowe, Suffolk on 22 September 1881, at the age of 56. His eldest son, John, inherited the baronetcy from his brother, the 3rd Baronet, in 1887.

Parliament of the United Kingdom
Preceded by John Bagshaw; Robert John Bagshaw	Member of Parliament for Harwich; 1859–1880; With: Robert John Bagshaw March 1859 – May 1859; William Campbell May 1859 – 1860; Richard Rowley 1860–1865; John Kelk 1865–1868	Succeeded by Sir Henry Tyler
