= Astell =

Astell is a surname. Notable people with the surname include:

- Betty Astell (1912–2005), English actress
- John Harvey Astell (1806–1887), British politician
- Mary Astell (1666–1731), English writer, philosopher, and rhetorician
- William Astell (1774–1847), English Member of Parliament and director of the East India Company
