= David Johnston (minister) =

Historic Scottish religious minister

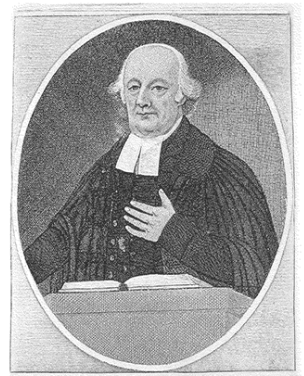
Rev David Johnston of North Leith

David Johnstone (1734–1824) was a Church of Scotland minister who served almost 60 years as minister of North Leith Parish Church. He was Chaplain in Ordinary to King George IV in Scotland.

== Life ==
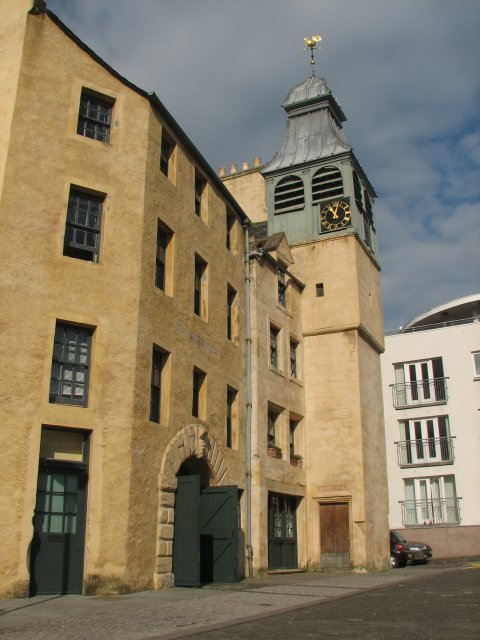
Old North Leith Parish Church and manse

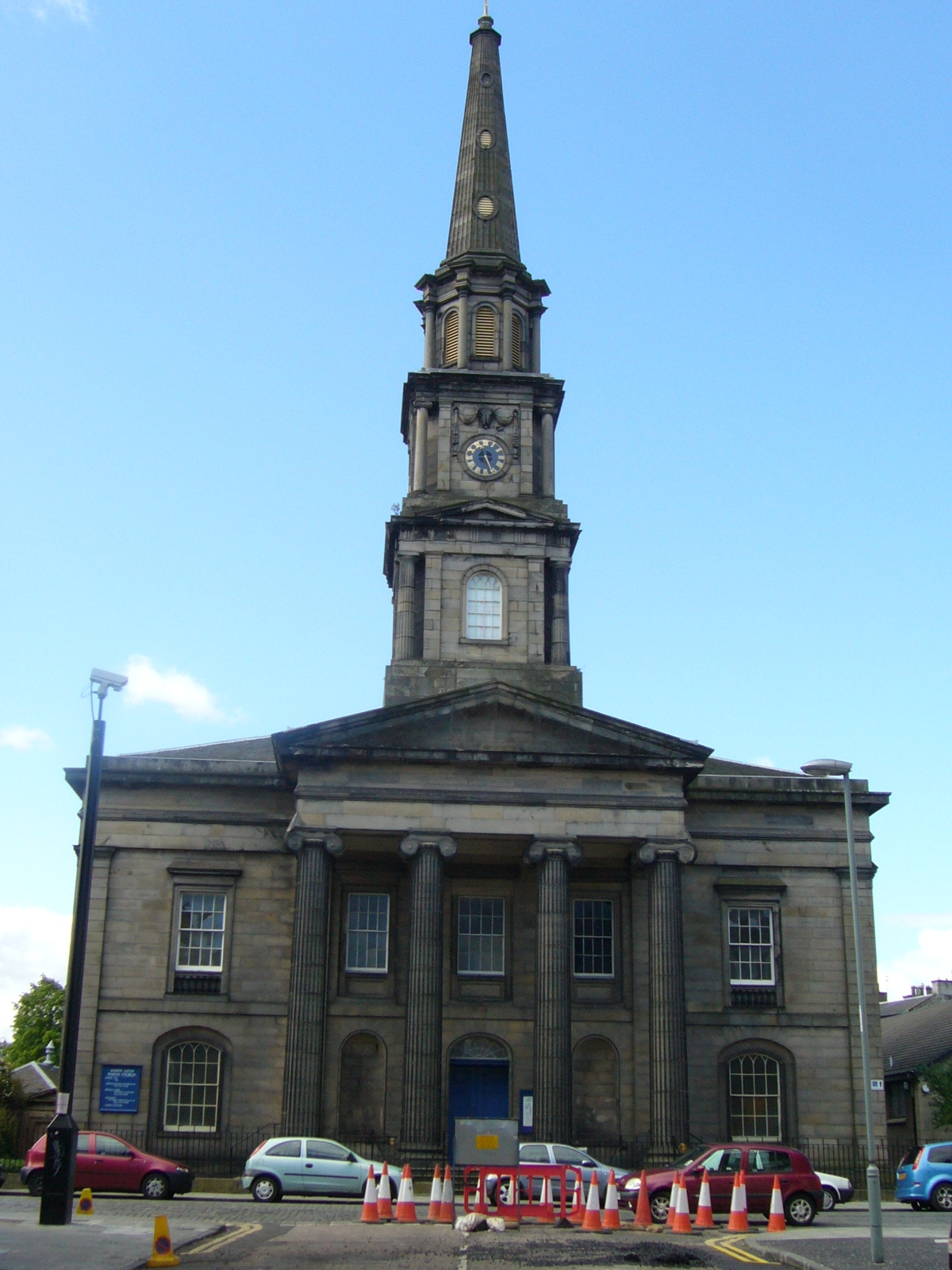
North Leith Parish Kirk built in 1815

He was born in Arngask manse, near Glenfarg on 26 April 1734 the second son of Rev John Johnstone the local minister. He was the maternal grandson of Rev David Williamson of St Cuthbert's Church in Edinburgh (a.k.a. "Dainty Davie").

He studied at Edinburgh University and was licensed to preach by the Presbytery of Selkirk in July 1757.

He was ordained as minister of Langton in May 1758. He was presented to the congregation of North Leith in 1764 and officially became minister of North Leith Parish Church in July 1765. He remained minister of the church until his death.

In 1793, with Rev Thomas Blacklock he co-founded the Blind Asylum in Edinburgh. The original structure being at 58 Nicolson Street in Edinburgh. a second female building was opened in 1822 at 38 Nicolson Street. In the same year he was created Chaplain in Ordinary to King George III. For the latter role the King offered him a knighthood in 1812 but he declined this offer.

In 1815, when the new North Leith Parish Church was built around 1 km to the south-west, on Madeira Street, although preaching at the new church, he refused to leave his home in the old manse, which was built integral with the church. This frustrated redevelopment, resulting in the odd mox which now exists: a rebuilt structure to the west which was built as a mill in 1825, the manse of 1600, remodelled in 1720 and the church spire of 1675.

He died in North Leith manse on 5 July 1824. He is buried in the small nearby graveyard on Coburg Street.

== Family ==
In July 1759 he married Elizabeth Todd (1735-1796) eldest daughter of John Todd a Leith shipbuilder. Their children included:

- Lt John Johnstone HEICS (1761-1786) died on service in Bombay
- Gavin (1762-1773)
- Robert (1767-1768)
- Margaret (1769-1770)
- David (1770-1771)
- Henrietta (1772-1785)
- David (1773-1775)
- Elizabeth (1775-1869) married the Glasgow merchant William Penney, mother of William Penney, Lord Kinloch
- Jane (1777-1818) married Robert MacBriar of Glasgow

== Gladstone ==
- Thomas Gladstones was Treasurer of the Kirk Session under Johnstone and a close friend. His son John Gladstone was a member of the congregation and Rev Johnstone took a very strong interest in his career.

Gladstones owned the land facing the church across the Water of Leith: living on King Street and with premises on Coalhill.

== Publications ==
- Dissertation on the Encouragement which Our Blessed Lord Gave to Little Children (1799)

== Artistic recognition ==
A marble bust of Rev Johnston stands in the vestibule of the current North Leith Parish Church.
