= Hartrigge House =

Coordinates: 55°29′02″N 2°32′18″W

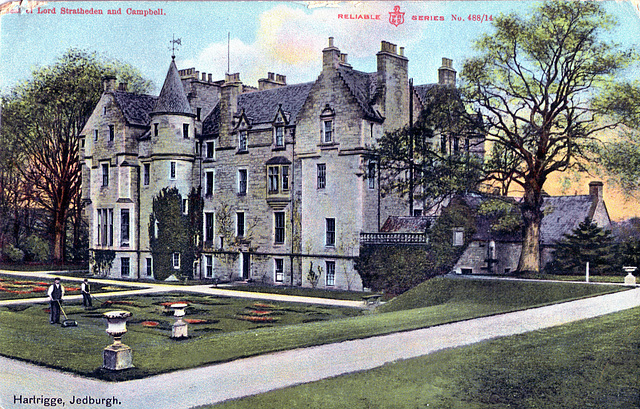
- Hartrigge House with workers mowing the lawn
- Interactive map of the Hartrigge House area

General information
- Location: Jedburgh, Scotland
- Construction started: 17th century
- Completed: 1614, 1854
- Demolished: 1950s
- Client: Andrew Miller

Hartrigge House or Stewartfield House was a country house in Jedburgh in the Scottish Borders. Its first owner was in 1614 and it was rebuilt in 1854. It was the home to the Lord Chancellor, John Campbell, 1st Baron Campbell. It was demolished in the 1950s. Some listed outbuildings and lodges still exist.

== History ==
The first owner of the Hartrigge house was Andrew Miller who lived in it from 1614 to 1640, and the second owner was Sir Francis Scott of Mangertoun.

John Stewart, an ex-Commissioner for Kirkcudbrightshire in the Parliament of Scotland, was in charge of the house after his marriage in 1704 to Elizabeth Scott, the daughter and heir of Sir Francis Scott. Stewart already had land at Kirkcudbright that he had inherited from his father. The land at Hartrigge became "Stewartfield" under his brief control. The newlywed Stewart was invited to after election meeting at the Black Bull Inn in Jedburgh to celebrate the victory of Sir Gilbert Eliott, 3rd Baronet, of Stobs. Eliot was annoyed that Stewart had not voted for him and Stewart threw a glass of wine at Eliot. Stewart later complained that he was murdered whist sitting although he did manage to rise to his feet after Eliot stabbed him with his sword. Stewart died and Eliot had to flee the country. In time Eliot's friend's interceded on his behalf and he was allowed to return to Scotland after a royal pardon.

In 1845 Miller sold "Stewartfield" to John Campbell, 1st Baron Campbell. Campbell was a lawyer who rose to be Lord Chancellor. He changed the name of the house back to Hartrigge - a name it had in the 17th century. This was after he became Baron Campbell of St Andrews. His wife had become Baroness Stratheden in her own right in 1836. In 1854 he had the house rebuilt with David Bryce as the architect. Campbell became a widower in 1860 and died the following year. The house became the property of William Campbell, 2nd Baron Stratheden and Campbell who was a politician with another house in Knightsbridge.

Thomas Gordan who had served in the army in India married Elizabeth Brown. He had an accident in a carriage that damaged his hip. He left India in 1860 and rented Hartrigge in May 1864. William Lowndes Yancey stayed at the house at the end of 1862. Yancey was a Confederate politician intent on persuading Lord Russell that slavery was OK. He was also talking to "North". Commander James North was placing orders for an iron clad steamship in Glasgow. Gordan rented the house until 1872. William Penney, Lord Kinloch died at Hartrigge House, near Jedburgh, on 31 October 1872.

In 1929 it was rented from Lord Stratheden by Sir Charles Addiss, who was a director of the Bank of England. One of his house guests was the poet laureate John Betjeman who began an affair with his daughter.

The house was put up for auction but it was withdrawn because of lack of interest. The highest bid was £600 and the owners were expecting £5,000.

== Legacy ==
There are several listed buildings that survived after the demolition. Hartrigge Lodge and Wildcat lodge are both residences and the old coach and stable block are also extant.
