= William Penney, Lord Kinloch =

Scottish judge

The Hon William Penney, Lord Kinloch (1801–1872) was a Scottish judge, and Senator of the College of Justice.

== Life ==
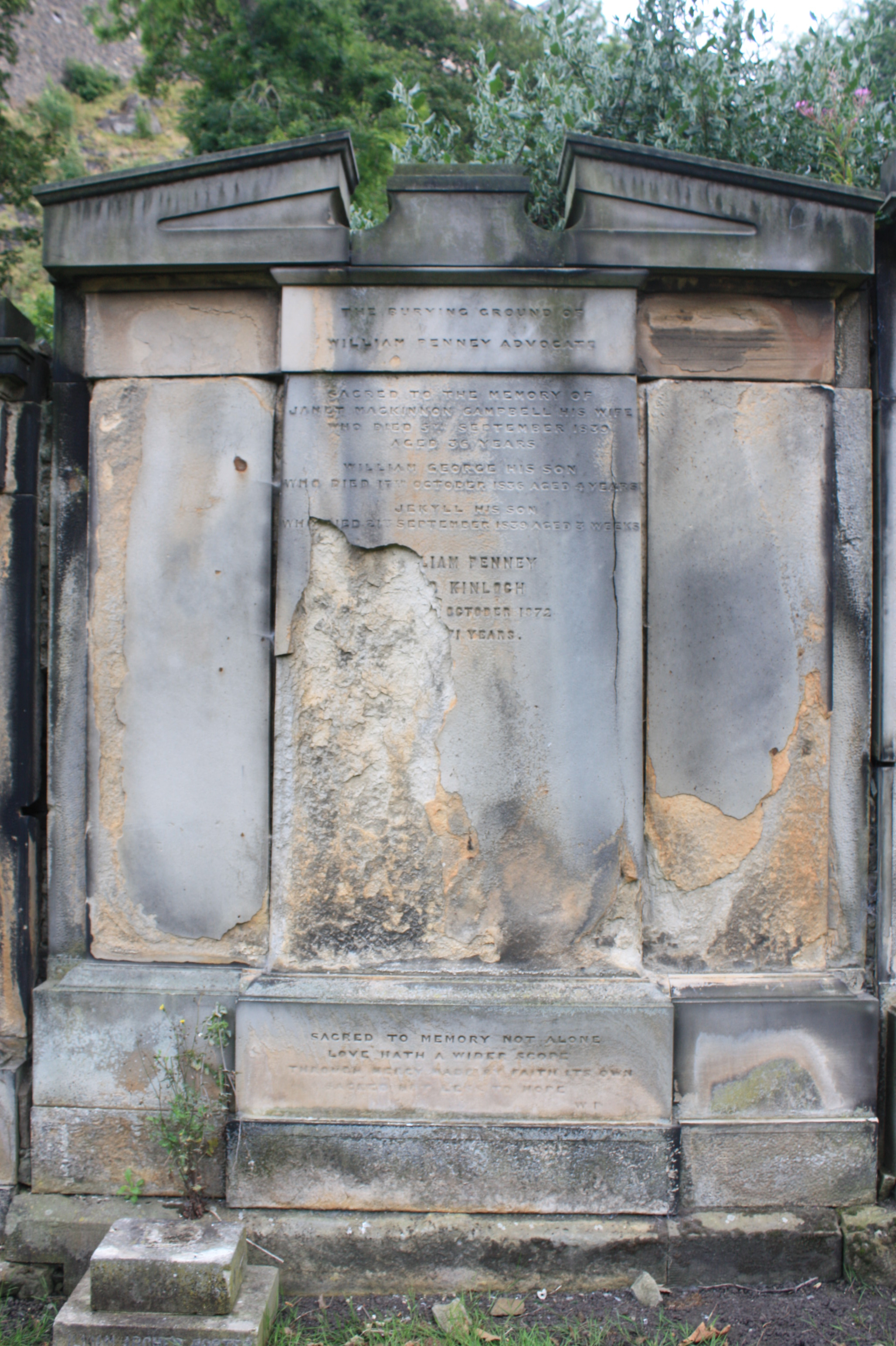
The grave of William Penney, St Cuthberts

The son of William Penney, a manufacturer at Castlepens Wynd in Glasgow, and Elizabeth, daughter of David Johnston, D.D., North Leith, was born in Glasgow and studied law at Glasgow University. He entered the office of Alexander Morrison, a solicitor, and then spent some time in an accountant's office.

In 1824 Penney was called to the Scottish bar, and gained a practice, mainly in commercial cases. In politics he was a conservative.

In 1845 he was working in Edinburgh as an advocate, living at 24 Great King Street in Edinburgh's Second New Town.

He was raised to the bench on the recommendation of Lord Derby, in May 1858, on the death of Robert Handyside, Lord Handyside, taking the title of "Lord Kinloch". When a vacancy occurred in the inner house of the court of session, on Lord Curriehill's death, Penney succeeded to the post in 1868.

Penney died at Hartrigge House, near Jedburgh, on 31 October 1872.

He is buried in St Cuthbert's Churchyard in Edinburgh. The grave lies on a boundary wall in the southern section. His wife, Louisa Jane Campbell (1814-1887) was buried independently at Dean Cemetery.

== Works ==
Penney was the author of religious works in prose and verse:

- ‘The Circle of Christian Doctrine, a Handbook of Faith, framed out of a Layman's Experience,’ Edinburgh, 1861; 2nd ed. 1861; 3rd ed. 1865.
- ‘Time's Treasure, or Devout Thoughts for every Day of the Year, expressed in verse,’ Edinburgh, 1863; 2nd ed. 1863; 3rd ed. 1865. A selection entitled ‘Devout Moments’ appeared in 1866.
- ‘Studies for Sunday Evening,’ Edinburgh, 1866.
- ‘Faith's Jewels presented in Verse, with other Devout Verses,’ Edinburgh, 1869.
- ‘Thoughts of Christ for every Day in the Year,’ London, 1871.
- ‘Readings in Holy Writ,’ Edinburgh, 1871.
- ‘Hymns to Christ,’ Edinburgh, 1872.

== Family ==
Penney was twice married: first, in 1828, to Janet, daughter of Charles Campbell of Leckuary, Argyllshire (died 1839); and, secondly, in 1842, to Louisa, daughter of John Campbell of Kinloch, Perthshire (died 1887). He left five sons and seven daughters.

== Arms ==
Coat of arms of William Penney, Lord Kinloch

Crest
A demi-lion rampant Proper holding in its dexter paw a plate.
Motto
Unita Fortitor

== Notes ==
Attribution

This article incorporates text from a publication now in the public domain: Lee, Sidney, ed. (1895). "Penney, William". Dictionary of National Biography. Vol. 44. London: Smith, Elder & Co.
