= John Stewart (of Livingstone) =

Scottish professional soldier

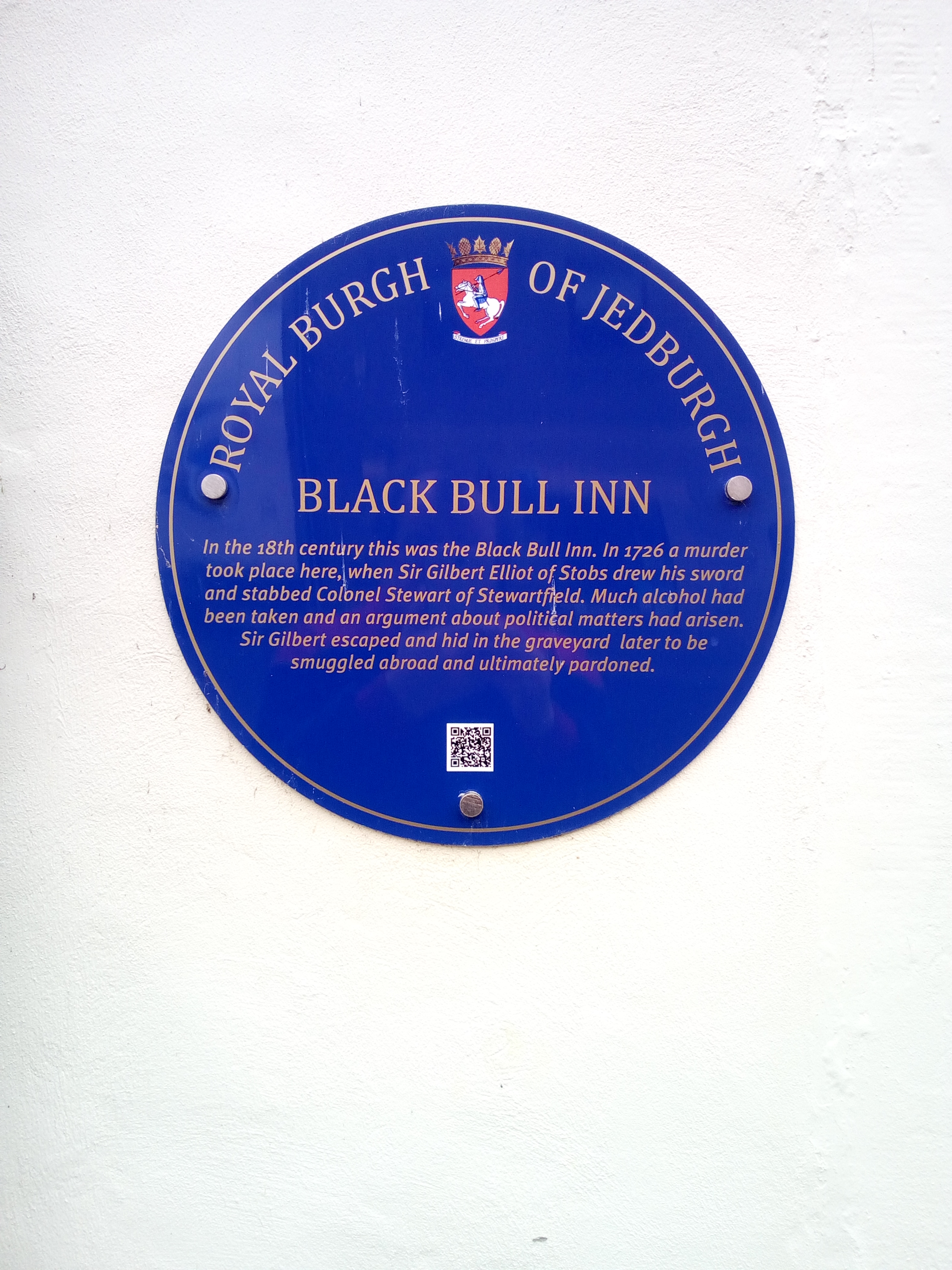
The blue plaque records where he was murdered

Colonel John Stewart (died 1726) was a Scottish professional soldier, first in the Scottish Army and then (after the Union with England) in the British Army. He served with the army in Scotland, France and Flanders, and held a seat in the House of Commons of Great Britain from 1708 to 1715.

He lived at Hartrigge House in Jedburgh and he was killed in 1726 in a drunken fight with a Member of Parliament (MP).

== Life ==
Stewart's early life is unclear. He appears to be the son of William Stewart of Livingstone, but the evidence is uncertain.

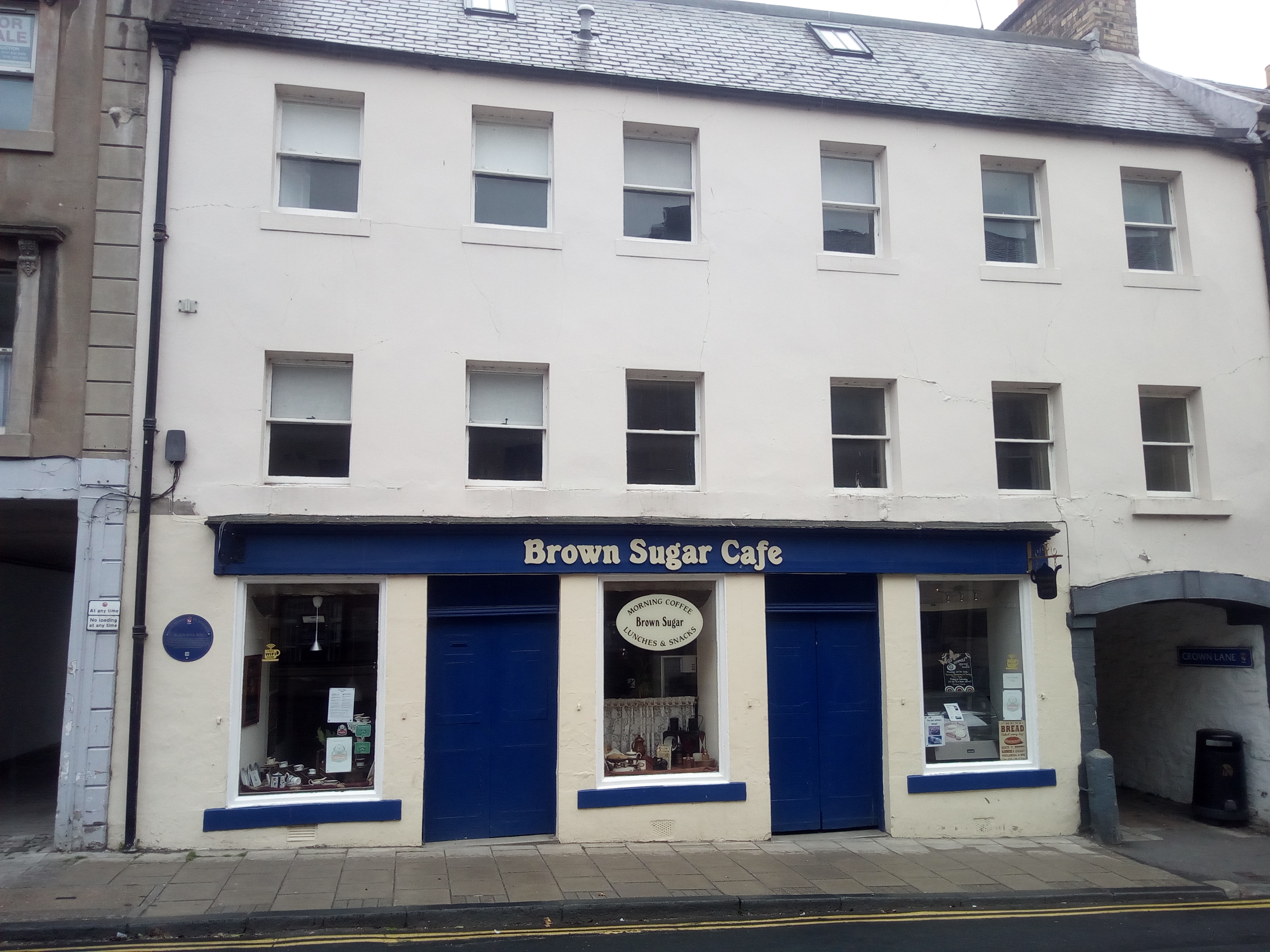
This was the Black Bull Inn

He joined the army some time after the Glorious Revolution, but his early military career is also obscure. He probably served with the Scots Greys, and may have been the Captain John Stewart ‘of Galloway’ who joined Brigadier-General William Stewart's regiment in 1695. The first confirmed fact of his military career is that in 1707 he became a Lieutenant-Colonel in the regiment newly raised by Alexander Grant.

From 1708 he served in Flanders with the Duke of Marlborough, returning periodically to Scotland, where he had been elected in 1708 at the first general election to the new Parliament of Great Britain. In a contest assisted by his opponent being jailed as a suspected Jacobite, Stewart was returned as the MP for Kirkcudbright Stewartry.

Returning to Scotland two years later for the 1710 election, he was captured from his ship by a French privateer. Released on parole, he was re-elected in the Stewartry, but negotiations with the French proved slow and he was not fully cleared until late 1711.

Re-elected in 1713, Stewart was classified as a Whig. He was not a very active member of the House of Commons, and stood down at the 1715 election. He had gone to half-pay in the army in 1713.

== Death ==
Stewart was a burgess of Edinburgh in 1708, and of Glasgow in 1716. He was a commissioner of supply for Kirkcudbright Stewartry in 1706. He held land both in Livingstone in Kirkcudbright and at Stewartfield in Jedburgh, the first inherited from his father, and the latter through his marriage in 1704 to Elizabeth Scott, the daughter and heir of Sir Francis Scott of Mangerton in Roxburghshire.

Those landholding qualified him as a freeholder, with a vote in each county's elections. After the by-election in Roxburghshire in 1726, a meeting of the county's freeholders was followed by a dinner. One of those present was the by-election winner Sir Gilbert Eliott, 3rd Baronet, of Stobs, who complained to Stewart for not voting for him. An argument followed, and Stewart threw a glass of wine in Eliott's face, who responded by running his sword through the seated Stewart.

Stewart managed to stand and return two blows before the two men were separated, but the wound was fatal. Stewart's dying words were that he had been murdered sitting in his chair, and that his assailant was Sir Gilbert Eliott.

Eliott was declared an outlaw, and escaped into exile before being given a royal pardon.

Parliament of the United Kingdom
New constituency	Member of Parliament for Kirkcudbright Stewartry; 1708 – 1715	Succeeded by Patrick Heron
