= Freemasonry in Suffolk =

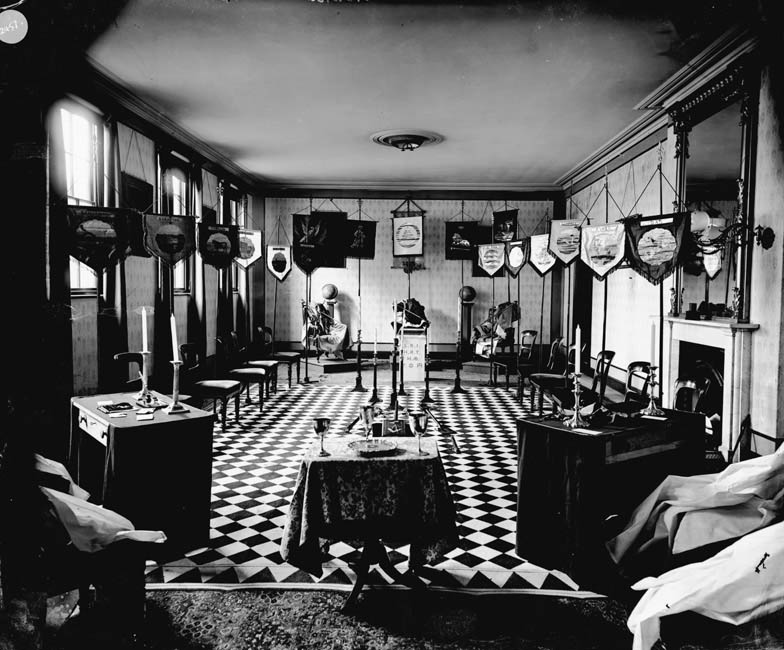
Manorial Room at the Masonic Hall, Bury St Edmunds, circa 1900

Freemasonry in Suffolk dates back to 1772 when the Suffolk "Province" was founded. In 2008 the then Provincial Grand Master of Suffolk, Barry Ross, claimed they had 3,000 members organised in 66 lodges. They operate out of 21 centres. As of 2024 there are now 69 lodges in Suffolk. The Freemasons' Hall was built in Soane Street, Ipswich in 1897. It is a grade II listed building run by the Ipswich Masonic Hall Trust.

In accordance with the Suffolk Code, councillors in Suffolk are asked to declare whether they are a Freemason.

== History ==
=== Ipswich Royal Ark Masons ===
There are claims that Royal Ark Masons started in Ipswich in 1772, but the documentary evidence only goes back as far as 1789, when Ebenezer Sibley and a Mr Wood arrived in Ipswich. The group is sometimes described as "irregular" or "quasi-masonic", as it was formed in order to have a political impact.

=== United Grand Lodge of England ===
In 1886 Robert Adair, 1st Baron Waveney was the United Grand Lodge of England Provincial Grand Master of Suffolk until his death on 15 February. There were over 800 freemasons in Suffolk distributed in 22 craft lodges:

Lodge No.	Lodge name	Location	Membership	Notes
71	Unity	Lowestoft	72	
81	Doric	Woodbridge	50	
114	British Union	Ipswich	47	
225	St. Luke	Ipswich	93	Some material archived at the Suffolk Record Office, Ipswich
305	Apollo	Beccles	20	
332	Virtue and Silence	Hadleigh	27	Founded in 1811 at the Shoulder of Mutton. When the tenant of the pub died the lodge moved to the White Lion around 1824/5.
376	Perfect Friendship	Ipswich	68	
388	Prudence	Halesworth	34	
516	Phoenix	Stowmarket	41	
555	Fidelity	Framlingham	35	
929	Waveney	Bungay	30	
936	Adair	Aldeburgh	22	
959	Prince of Wales	Ipswich	*	
1008	Royal St. Edmund	Bury St. Edmunds	49	
1224	Stour Valley	Sudbury	61	
1452	St. Margaret	Lowestoft	25	
1592	Abbey	Bury St. Edmunds	31	
1631	St. Andrew	Gorleston	30	
1663	Hertismere	Eye	23	
1823	Royal Clarence	Clare	*	
1983	Martyn	Southwold	25	
9194	Court Knoll	Boxford	39	* = No returns

→

== Masonic buildings in Suffolk ==
Location	Building name	Notes	Image
Chequer Square, Bury St Edmunds	Masonic Hall	Six masonic lodges meet at this hall situated in Chequer Square, at the junction of Churchgate Street and Angel Hill.This is a Grade II listed building, formerly the Six Bells Inn.	
Soane Street, Ipswich	Ipswich Masonic Hall	Located at far end of photograph. This is a Grade II listed building.	
North Street, Sudbury	Masonic Hall		
