= Andrew Steuart =

British Conservative politician

Member of Parliament for Cambridge
- In office 28 March 1857 – 12 February 1863 Serving with Kenneth Macaulay
- Preceded by: Robert Adair; Francis Mowatt
- Succeeded by: Kenneth Macaulay; Francis Powell

Personal details
- Born: 11 May 1822 Auchlunkart
- Died: 27 January 1905 (aged 82) Mentone, France
- Party: Conservative
- Spouse: Elizabeth Georgiana Graham Gordon

Andrew Steuart (1822 – 27 January 1905) was a British Conservative politician.

== Parliamentary career ==
Steuart was elected Conservative MP for Cambridge at the 1857 general election and held the seat until he resigned in 1863.

== Family ==
On 11 May 1847, he married his cousin; Elizabeth Georgiana Graham Gordon, daughter of Thomas Duff Gordon of Park. Together they had one daughter

- Harriet Elizabeth Steuart (3 January 1849 – 3 February 1908)

Parliament of the United Kingdom
Preceded by Robert Adair; Francis Mowatt	Member of Parliament for Cambridge; 1857–1863; With: Kenneth Macaulay	Succeeded by Kenneth Macaulay; Francis Powell
