= Robert Adair, 1st Baron Waveney =

Irish-born British politician

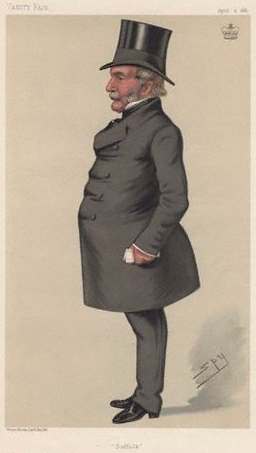
"Suffolk" Lord Waveney as caricatured by Spy (Leslie Ward) in Vanity Fair, April 1881

Robert Alexander Shafto Adair, 1st Baron Waveney (25 August 1811 – 15 February 1886) was a British Liberal Party politician who served as a Member of Parliament (MP) for Cambridge for 8 of the years from 1847 to 1857. He also Served as a One of the First Member of The House Of Lords For the Liberal Party

== Life ==
Born in Ballymena, County Antrim, Ireland, Adair was the older of the two sons of Sir Robert Shafto Adair, 1st Baronet, and his first wife Elizabeth Maria Strode. He was educated at Harrow School. He married Theodosia Meade in 1836; they had no children.

Adair first stood for election to Parliament in April 1843, when he was the runner-up at a by-election for the Eastern division of Suffolk. He was unsuccessful again at a by-election for the borough of Cambridge in July 1845, but at the 1847 general election he was elected as one of Cambridge's two MPs. He was defeated at the 1852 general election, but that result was overturned on petition and he was returned to the House of Commons at the resulting by-election in August 1854. He was unseated again in 1857 general election, and, at the 1859 general election, again unsuccessfully contested East Suffolk. He stood again one more time, in Canterbury at the 1865 general election, but did not win a seat. He was appointed High Sheriff of Antrim in 1853.

When the old East Suffolk Militia was reconstituted as the Suffolk Artillery Militia in 1853, Adair was appointed to command it as Lieutenant-Colonel. He remained in command for many years, and was appointed its first Honorary Colonel on 19 November 1881.

A Fellow of the Royal Society, he succeeded to the baronetcy in 1869, on the death of his father. He was ennobled on 10 April 1873, as Baron Waveney, of South Elmham in the County of Suffolk. He was Provincial Grand Master of the United Grand Lodge of England Masonic province of Suffolk at the time of his death. He served as Lord Lieutenant of Antrim from 1884 until his death in 1886, aged 74, when the peerage became extinct and he was succeeded in the baronetcy by his younger brother Hugh (1815–1902), who had been MP for Ipswich from 1847 to 1874.

== Ballymena ==
The Adair family owned extensive estates in Ballymena, and have been described as the "founding fathers" of the town. The town is built on land given to the Adair family by King Charles 1 in 1626, on the provision that the town holds two annual fairs and a free Saturday market in perpetuity.

In 1865 Adair began the construction in the demesne of Ballymena Castle, a substantial family residence in the Scottish baronial style. The castle was not completed until 1887, and was demolished in 1957 after having lain empty for some years and being vandalised; the site is now a car park, where said Saturday market is held. In 1870, Adair donated The People's Park to Ballymena, engaging fifty labourers to work for six months landscaping it.

Parliament of the United Kingdom
Preceded by Hon. John Manners-Sutton; Fitzroy Kelly	Member of Parliament for Cambridge; 1847 – 1852; With: Hon. William Campbell	Succeeded by Kenneth Macaulay; John Harvey Astell
Preceded by Kenneth Macaulay; John Harvey Astell	Member of Parliament for Cambridge; 1854 – 1857; With: Francis Mowatt	Succeeded by Kenneth Macaulay; Andrew Steuart
Baronetage of the United Kingdom
Preceded by Robert Shafto Adair	Baronet (of Flixton Hall, Suffolk); 1869–1886	Succeeded by Hugh Edward Adair
Peerage of the United Kingdom
New creation	Baron Waveney; 1873–1886	Extinct
Honorary titles
Preceded by The Marquess of Donegall	Lord Lieutenant of Antrim; 1884–1886	Succeeded by Sir Edward Porter Cowan
