= Francis Mowatt (politician) =

British Radical politician

Member of Parliament for Cambridge
- In office 18 August 1854 – 28 March 1857 Serving with Robert Adair
- Preceded by: Kenneth Macaulay; John Harvey Astell
- Succeeded by: Kenneth Macaulay; Andrew Steuart

Member of Parliament for Penryn and Falmouth
- In office 30 July 1847 – 8 July 1852 Serving with Howel Gwyn
- Preceded by: John Vivian; James Hanway Plumridge
- Succeeded by: Howel Gwyn; James William Freshfield

Personal details
- Born: 1803
- Died: 12 February 1891 (aged 87)
- Party: Radical
- Spouse: Sarah Sophia Barnes
- Children: Francis Mowatt

Francis Mowatt (1803 – 12 February 1891) was a British Radical politician.

Mowatt married Sarah Sophia, daughter of Captain Barnes of Romford, and they had at least one son, Francis Mowatt, a British civil servant.

Mowatt was first elected Radical MP for Penryn and Falmouth at the 1847 general election, and held the seat until 1852 when he unsuccessfully sought election at Cambridge. He was later elected MP for the latter seat at a by-election in 1854—caused by the 1852 result being declared void due to bribery and treating. He held the seat until 1857, when he did not seek re-election, and was unsuccessful when he again stood in 1859.

Parliament of the United Kingdom
Preceded by Kenneth Macaulay; John Harvey Astell	Member of Parliament for Cambridge; 1854–1857; With: Robert Adair	Succeeded by Kenneth Macaulay; Andrew Steuart
Preceded by John Vivian; James Hanway Plumridge	Member of Parliament for Penryn and Falmouth; 1847–1852; With: Howel Gwyn	Succeeded by Howel Gwyn; James William Freshfield
