= Thomas Burns (minister, born 1853) =

Reverend Thomas Burns CBE TD FRSE FSA (1853–1938) was a Scottish minister and strong campaigner for the blind. As Chair of the Royal Blind School in Edinburgh he was the creator of the Thomas Burns Home which was named after him. He was also an author on several historical subjects.

== Life ==
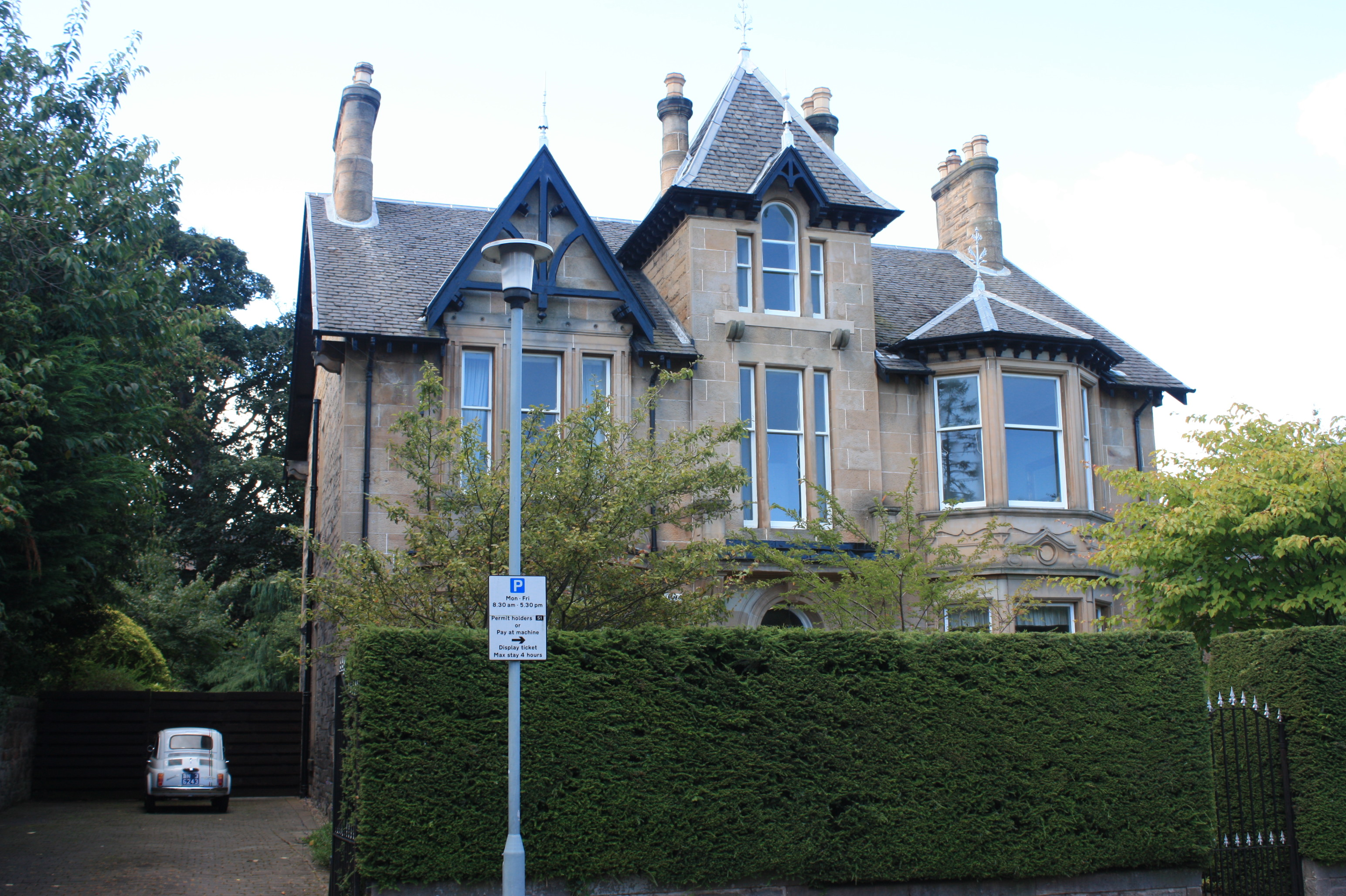
3 Chalmers Crescent, Edinburgh

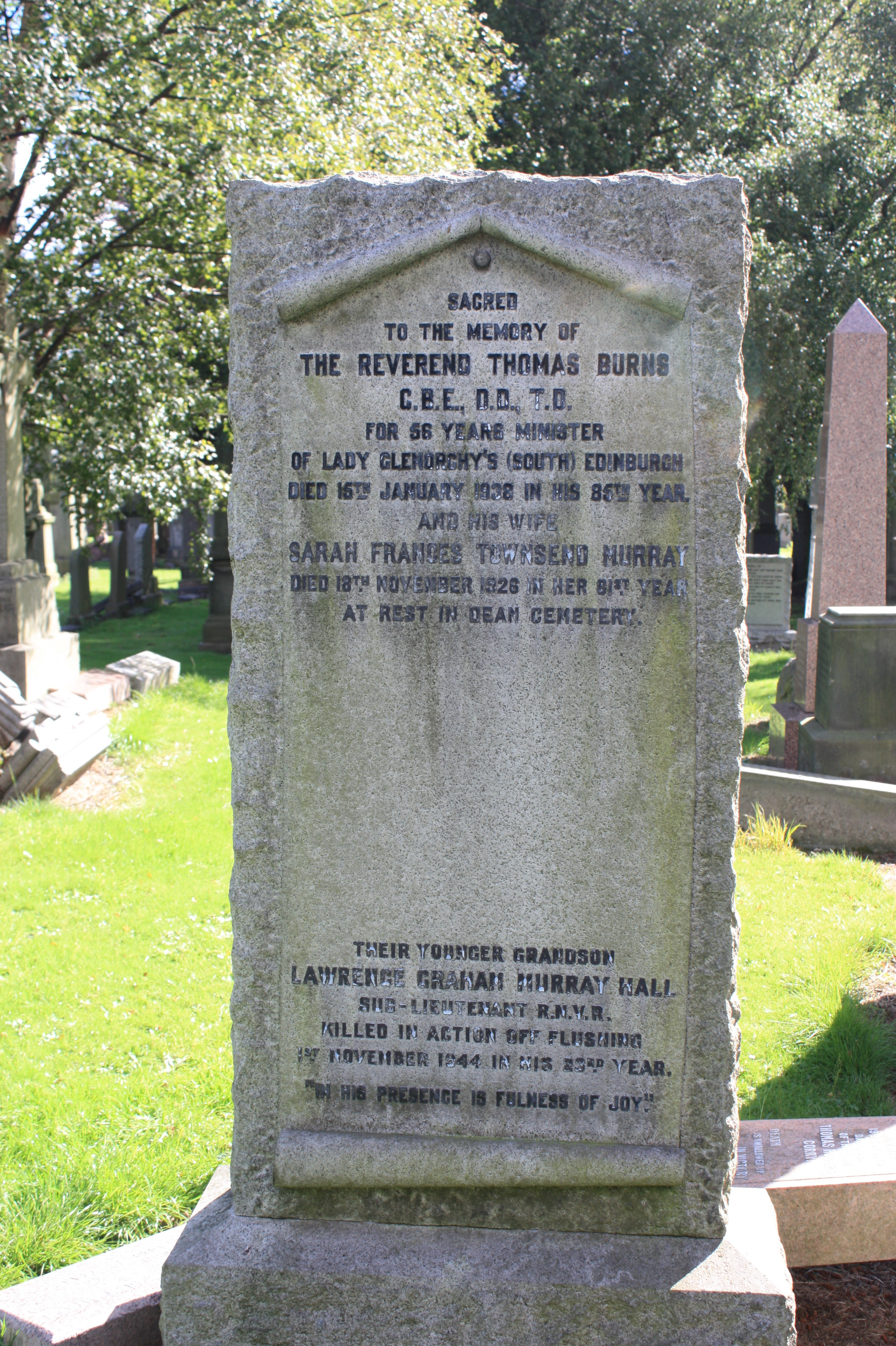
The grave of Reverend Dr Thomas Burns, Grange Cemetery, Edinburgh

He was born in Lesmahagow on 3 March 1853 the son of Reverend Thomas Burns (1807–1868), minister of the Second Charge, Lesmahagow and Agnes Maxwell McNaughton (1826–1865), daughter of Reverend Allan McNaughton (1794–1875), minister of the First Charge, Lesmahagow.

He was educated at Glasgow High School then Glasgow University. He was licensed as a Church of Scotland minister by the Presbytery of Glasgow in 1876 and ordained into Melville parish, near Montrose, Aberdeenshire in 1877. From there in 1882 he moved to the Lady Glenorchy's Church on Roxburgh Street in Edinburgh's Southside, where he served for most of his life.

In Edinburgh he also took on many additional duties, joining the Edinburgh School Board in 1888, and in 1894 taking on his most famous role, as Chairman of the Royal Blind School. In 1888 he was elected a Fellow of the Royal Society of Edinburgh. In 1890 he became a governor of George Heriot's Trust and in 1903 Chairman of the Edinburgh School Board. In 1906 he got an honorary Doctor of Divinity from Glasgow University.

In the First World War he saw active service as an Army Chaplain, rising to the rank of Major. He was Mentioned in Dispatches.

In the 1927 Birthday Honours he was made a Commander of the Order of the British Empire.

In 1929, under his chairmanship of the Royal Blind School, he created a new residential element, the Thomas Burns Home, on Alfred Place.

In 1931 he retired from his ministry at Lady Glenorchy's Church but continued in many other roles.

After a week's illness he died at home, 3a Chalmers Crescent in Edinburgh on 15 January 1938. He is buried in the south-west section of Grange Cemetery on one of the main east-west avenues.

== Family ==
In 1890 he married Sarah Frances Townsend Murray (1846–1926) daughter of Charles Wilson Murray of Croston Towers in Alderley Edge, granddaughter of Hugh Lyon Playfair. Their children were Agnes Mary Frances Burns (1891–1971), Reginald Thomas Murray Burns (1892–1972), and Norman Frederick MacGregor Burns (1902–1976).

Sarah is buried with him but also memorialised on her mother's grave in Dean Cemetery.

== Publications ==
- Old Communion Customs (1892)
- Old Scottish Communion Plate, including Hallmarks and Tokens (1896)
- Life of Lady Glenorchy (1902)
- American Educational Institutions and Methods (1901)
