= Kelk baronets =

Extinct baronetcy in the Baronetage of the United Kingdom

The Kelk Baronetcy, of Bentley Priory in the Parish of Stanmore and of Lancaster Gate, both in the County of Middlesex, was a title in the Baronetage of the United Kingdom. It was created on 16 May 1874 for the civil engineering contractor and former member of parliament for Harwich, John Kelk. The second Baronet was High Sheriff of Wiltshire in 1892. The title became extinct on his death in 1923.

== Kelk baronets, of Bentley Priory (1874) ==
- Sir John Kelk, 1st Baronet (1816–1886)
- Sir John William Kelk, 2nd Baronet (1851–1923)
