= John Kelk =

British politician, builder and public works contractor (1816-1886)

John Kelk MP

Member of Parliament for Harwich
- In office 12 July 1865 – 17 November 1868 Serving with Henry Jervis-White-Jervis
- Preceded by: Henry Jervis-White-Jervis; Richard Rowley
- Succeeded by: Henry Jervis-White-Jervis

Personal details
- Born: 16 February 1816 Soho, London, UK
- Died: 12 September 1886 (aged 70) Tedworth House, Tidworth, Wiltshire, UK
- Resting place: Kensal Green Cemetery
- Party: Conservative
- Spouse: Rebecca Anne Kelk (m. 1848)
- Children: Five, including John Kelk
- Parent(s): John Kelk; Martha Germain

Sir John Kelk, 1st Baronet (16 February 1816 – 12 September 1886) was a British Conservative Party politician, builder and public works contractor.

== Family ==
Kelk was the son of his namesake, John Kelk, an ironsmith, and Martha, daughter of Jacob Germain. In 1848, he married his cousin, Rebecca Anne, daughter of George Kelk, and together they had five children:

- Ellen Maud (died 1938), Married Frederick William Maud, son of Sir George Ashley Maude.
- John William (1851–1923), became 2nd Baronet
- George Edward (1852–1876)
- Arthur Sanders (1854–1855)
- Charles James (1856–1874)

== Construction career ==
=== Buildings ===
Kelk started his career, after a commercial education, as an apprentice of builder Thomas Cubitt, with whom he later had fierce competition, and then went into partnership with William Newton. Upon Newton's retirement, he amalgamated the business with another Mayfair builder, John Elger, and then worked on rebuilding houses in Grosvenor Square, and churches St. Michael's Church, Chester Square, and All Saints, Margaret Street.

He also built Kneller Hall in Twickenham, the Museum of Practical Geology in Jermyn Street, designed by James Pennethorne and St Paul's Church, Camden Square from 1849 to 1851. In 1854 he was involved in the reconstruction of the Carlton Club in Pall Mall.

His firm was the main contractor for the Albert Memorial, a task which saw him "striking terror into at least one of the sculptors". This monument, inaugurated in 1872, saw him, and its architect George Gilbert Scott, offered a knighthood; while Scott accepted, Kelk refused, perhaps seeking the baronetcy he later obtained from Benjamin Disraeli on 16 May 1874.

=== Infrastructure ===
He generated considerable wealth in construction relating to railways and docks, acting primarily as the promoter rather than contractor, and handing over the firm to Smith and Taylor, his foremen, in 1862. During this period, he built the Commercial Dock Company's south dock in Rotherhithe, and was a partner in the Thames Ironworks and Shipbuilding Company, which produced the Royal Navy's first seafaring ironclad warship HMS Warrior in 1860, and the ironwork for Blackfriars Railway Bridge and Hammersmith Bridge.

Alongside these, he built the Millwall Dock with John Aird & Co., but this venture caused significant financial difficulty after the crash of Overend, Gurney and Company. The project was only able to proceed after help from Tower Hamlets MP Acton Smee Ayrton.

His most notable construction work, within his railway projects, was the Victoria Station and Pimlico Railway across the River Thames, built from 1858 to 1860 with John Fowler. Together, they also enlarged Farringdon station in 1863, to allow for the Metropolitan Railway, and Smithfield meat market goods depot. They were both also involved with Peto and Betts, and Waring Brothers, in building railway lines for the Metropolitan Railway between South Kensington and London Paddington station, and Metropolitan District Railway between Tower Hill and South Kensington, from 1864 to 1871.

=== South Kensington Museum ===
Kelk's firm also built the early buildings of the South Kensington Museum – now the Victoria and Albert Museum – including the Sheepshanks, Turner, and Vernon galleries, as well as its north court, south court, and lecture range.

=== 1862 exhibition ===
Kelk was instrumental in the construction of buildings for the 1862 International Exhibition, working with Lucas Brothers to erect the buildings for a lower than anticipated cost of £300,000 on the site of the now Natural History Museum. When the financing of the exhibition came under doubt, largely due to the death of Prince Albert, he offered to meet the shortfall.

=== Alexandra Palace ===
When dismantled, elements of the exhibition buildings were used for the creation of the Alexandra Palace, intended to be a rival to the Crystal Palace. Kelk's palace was designed by Owen Jones, but its architect was John Johnson; Lucas and Kelk provided a third of the finance required, with the remaining funds being provided by the London Finance Association, and some by an entrepreneur named Rodonachi who later withdrew from the project.

When the palace was destroyed by a fire in 1873, just a month after it had opened, Kelk lost a considerable amount of money. Nevertheless, the palace was rebuilt and re-opened on 1 May 1875.

== Political career ==
Kelk was elected MP for Harwich in 1865 but did not seek re-election when the seat was reduced to one member in 1868.

== Other activities ==
Having attained considerable wealth, Kelk bought Bentley Priory at Stanmore, and Tidworth sporting estate in Hampshire. At the latter, John Johnson was employed to extend Tedworth House and to rebuild St Mary's Church in 1878 to 1879. He again worked with Johnson to rebuild 3 Grosvenor Square for his own abode.

Kelk was a Major in the Engineer Volunteer Staff Corps, and became a member of the Institution of Civil Engineers in 1861, a Justice of the Peace (JP) and Deputy Lieutenant for Middlesex, and a JP and High Sheriff of Hampshire in 1884.

He died at his home, Tedworth House, on 12 September 1886, and was buried in Kensal Green Cemetery under a ledger-stone of the pink granite also used in the Albert Memorial.

Parliament of the United Kingdom
Preceded by Henry Jervis-White-Jervis; Richard Rowley	Member of Parliament for Harwich; 1865–1868; With: Henry Jervis-White-Jervis	Succeeded by Henry Jervis-White-Jervis
Baronetage of the United Kingdom
New creation	Baronet (of Bentley Priory); 1874–1886	Succeeded by John Kelk
