= Royal Blind School =

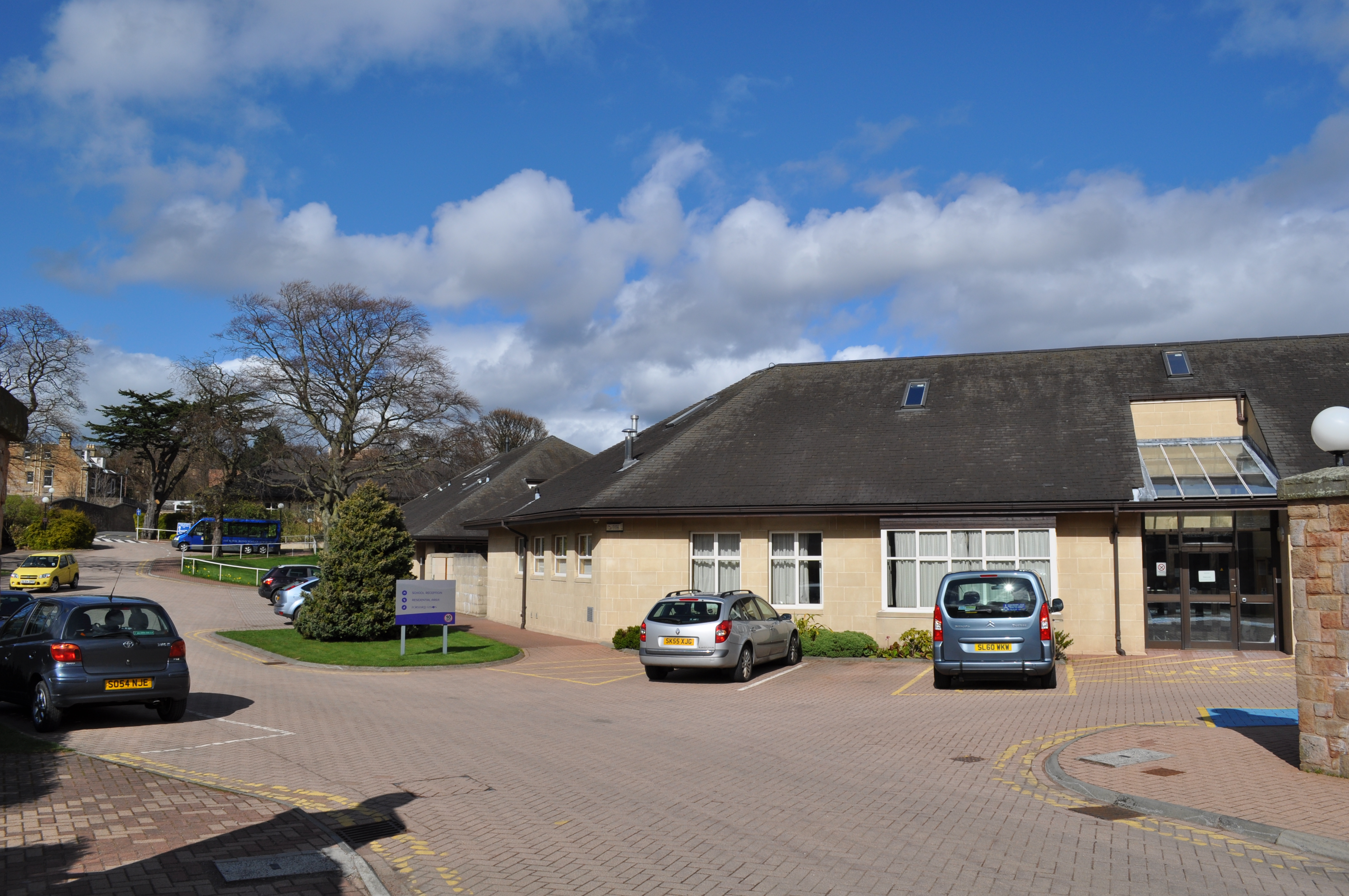
- Entrance to the Canaan Lane campus

Location
- 43-45 Canaan Lane; Edinburgh, EH10 4SG; Scotland
- Coordinates: 55.9294°N 3.2026°W

Information
- Type: Special school
- Established: 1793; 233 years ago
- Oversight: Royal Blind
- Head: Julie Shylan
- Gender: Co-educational
- Age: 3 to 19
- Enrolment: Approx. 71
- Website: www.royalblind.org/education
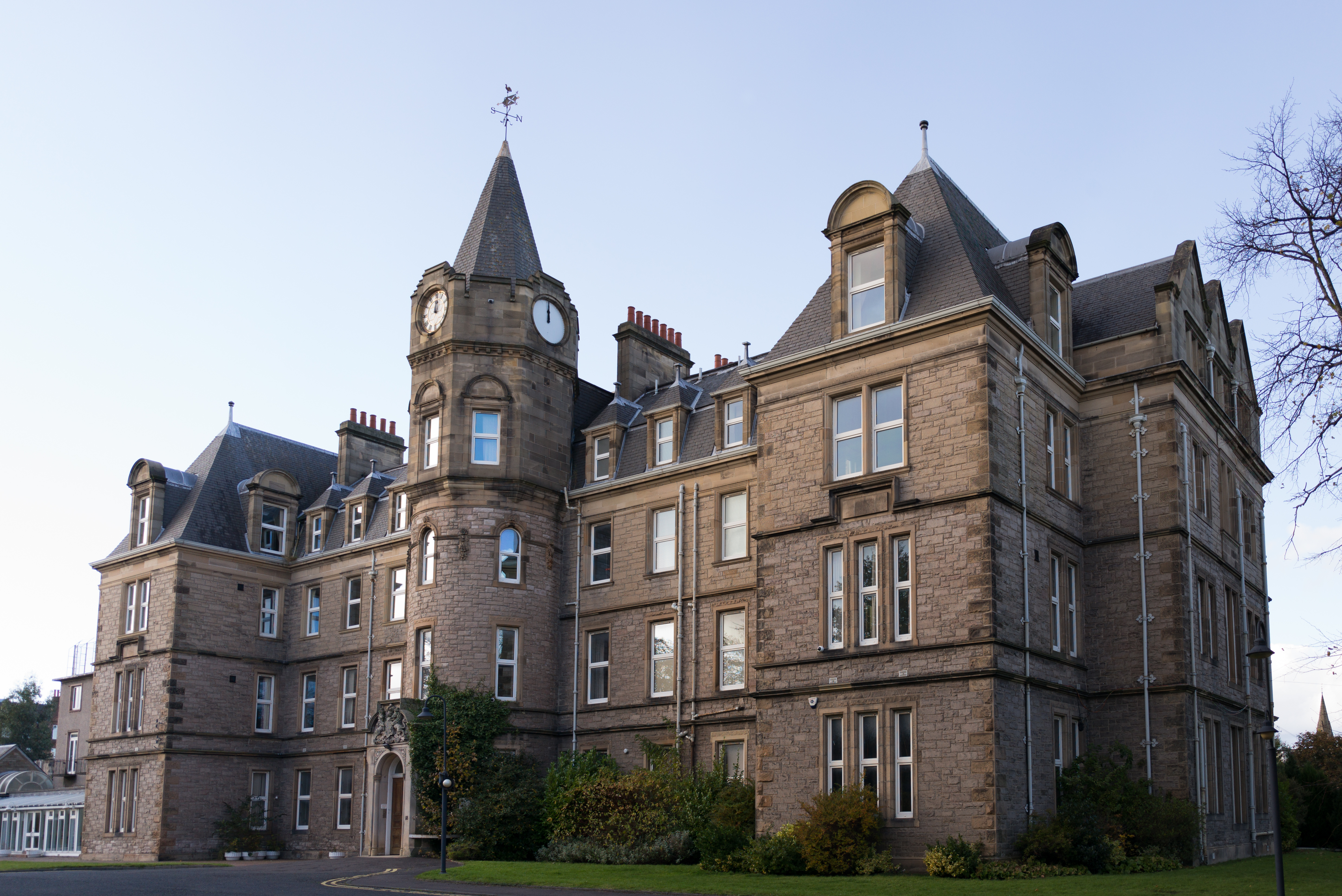
- Former Craigmillar Park campus

The Royal Blind School is a specialist day and boarding school in Edinburgh, Scotland that was established in 1793 and run by the charity, Royal Blind. The school caters for pupils aged 3 to 19 who are blind or partially sighted, and has facilities for children of nursery, primary and secondary age. Students attending the school come primarily from Scotland, but also from other parts of the United Kingdom.

The school was divided into two campuses, both situated in Edinburgh. These were located in Canaan Lane and Craigmillar Park. The Craigmillar Park campus is for pupils who are blind and partially sighted, while the Canaan Lane campus caters for students with multiple disabilities. In August 2014, the two campuses combined into one and all of the children now attend the Canaan Lane campus.

In March 1997, the school featured in a documentary for ITV as part of its Network First strand. A follow-up programme, Blind School Christmas Special was shown in December of that year.

== History ==
Founded in 1793 the School formed from an amalgam of different Edinburgh institutions.

In 1825 it took on a residential element, caring for 25 blind women at a premises at 1 Hill Place. In 1876 the premises moved to a much larger, custom-built building, designed by Charles Leadbetter, off Craigmillar Park in the south of the city, merging with the 1835 School for Blind Children. In 1929 the school and residential elements split, under the Chairmanship of Rev Dr Thomas Burns, creating a solely residential element, the Thomas Burns Home, on Alfred Place. In 1946 Oswald House was purchased to supplement the residential care provision. In 1979 the home was extended to provide for male residents.

In 1991 a new home was opened on Canaan Lane and this was further supplemented in 1999 by Braeside House on Liberton Brae, aimed at the blind elderly and incorporating a sensory garden.

== Notable alumni ==
- James Clegg, paralympic swimmer
- Libby Clegg, paralympic sprinter
- Stephen Clegg, paralympic swimmer
- Dennis Robertson, Scottish National Party MSP for Aberdeenshire West

== See also ==
- Exhall Grange School
- Jordanstown Schools
- New College Worcester
