= Richard Rowley (MP) =

British Conservative politician (1812-1887)

Richard Rowley MP

Member of Parliament for Harwich
- In office 24 April 1860 – 12 July 1865 Serving with Henry Jervis-White-Jervis
- Preceded by: Henry Jervis-White-Jervis; William Campbell
- Succeeded by: Henry Jervis-White-Jervis; John Kelk

Personal details
- Born: 1812 Bodrhyddan Hall, Rhuddlan, Flintshire, Wales
- Died: 11 November 1887 (aged 75)
- Party: Conservative
- Spouse(s): Alice Henrietta Berners (m. 1872) Charlotte Shipley (m. 1835; died 1871)
- Children: Three
- Parent(s): Clotworthy Rowley; Frances Rowley

Hon. Richard Thomas Rowley (1812 – 11 November 1887) was a British Conservative Party politician.

== Family ==
Rowley was the son of Clotworthy Rowley, 1st Baron Langford, and Frances Rowley. He married Charlotte Shipley, daughter of William Shipley and Charlotte Williams-Wynn on 24 June 1835. Together, they had three children:

- Eva Rowley (died 1904)
- Gwenwydd Frances Rowley (c. 1838–1892)
- Conwy Greville Hercules Rowley-Conwy (1841–1900)

After Charlotte died in 1871, Rowley remarried to Alice Henrietta Berners, daughter of Hugh Berners and Julia Alice Ashton, on 9 July 1872.

== Political career ==
He was elected MP for Harwich at a by-election in 1860 but did not seek re-election in 1865.

== Other activities ==
Rowley was at one point Captain in the Scots Guards, a Deputy Lieutenant of Flintshire, and Honorary Lieutenant-Colonel in the 6th Battalion, King's Royal Rifle Corps.

Parliament of the United Kingdom
Preceded by Henry Jervis-White-Jervis; William Campbell	Member of Parliament for Harwich; 1860–1865; With: Henry Jervis-White-Jervis	Succeeded by Henry Jervis-White-Jervis; John Kelk
