= People's Park, Ballymena =

Park in Ballymena, Northern Ireland

Coordinates: 54.863°N 6.267°W

The People's Park is set in the heart of Ballymena, County Antrim, Northern Ireland. The mature setting was donated to the town by Sir Robert Alexander Shafto Adair in 1870 and extends for 45 acres (180,000 m^{2}) around a lake. It has a children's playground, toddler area, floodlit tennis courts, bowling green and picnic areas. As well as this it has an information desk, vending machines, toilets and duck seed for feeding the park's ducks.
