= Robert John Bagshaw =

British politician (1803-1878)

Member of Parliament for Harwich
- In office 9 December 1857 – 2 May 1859 Serving with Henry Jervis-White-Jervis (March 1859–1859); John Bagshaw (1857–March 1859)
- Preceded by: John Bagshaw; George Drought Warburton
- Succeeded by: Henry Jervis-White-Jervis; William Campbell

Personal details
- Born: 31 December 1803
- Died: 14 August 1878 (aged 74)
- Party: Whig

Robert John Bagshaw (31 December 1803 – 14 August 1878) was a British Whig politician.

He was born the only son of John Bagshaw, MP for Harwich, who had developed the resort of Dovercourt, near Harwich. Robert continued the development of the town after his father's death in 1861.

After unsuccessfully contesting Great Yarmouth at a by-election in 1848, Bagshaw was elected Whig MP for Harwich at a by-election in 1857—caused by the death of George Drought Warburton—and held the seat until the 1859 general election when he did not seek re-election.

Parliament of the United Kingdom
Preceded by John Bagshaw; George Drought Warburton	Member of Parliament for Harwich; 1857–1859; With: Henry Jervis-White-Jervis (March 1859–May 1859); John Bagshaw (1857–March 1859)	Succeeded by Henry Jervis-White-Jervis; William Campbell
