= Kenneth Macaulay (politician) =

English Conservative Party politician

Member of Parliament for Cambridge

Personal details
- Born: 1812 Rothley, Leicestershire, England
- Died: 27 July 1867 (aged 54–55) Shaftesbury Road, Cambridge, England
- Spouse: Harriet Woollcombe
- Relations: Macaulay family of Lewis
- Education: Cambridge University

Kenneth Macaulay (1812 – 29 July 1867) was an English Conservative Party politician. He sat in the House of Commons between 1852 and 1865.

Macaulay was born on 30 September 1812 in Rothley, Leicestershire, England, the son of Rev. Aulay Macaulay, the vicar of Rothley. He was educated at Jesus College, Cambridge, graduating B.A. in 1835. He was a Cambridge Apostle; in 1843, he married Harriet Woollcombe, daughter of W. Woollcombe.

He was elected as a member of parliament for Cambridge at the 1852 general election, but the a petition was lodged and the election was declared void on 1 March 1853. A royal commission was established, and the writ of election was suspended until 1854. Macaulay contested the Cambridge again at the 1857 general election, and regained his seat, holding it until he stood down at the 1865 general election.

Macaulay died on 27 July 1867, in Shaftesbury Road, Cambridge.

Parliament of the United Kingdom
Preceded by Robert Adair; Hon. William Campbell	Member of Parliament for Cambridge; 1852 – 1853; With: John Harvey Astell	Succeeded by Robert Adair; Francis Mowatt
Preceded by Robert Adair; Francis Mowatt	Member of Parliament for Cambridge; 1857 – 1865; With: Andrew Steuart; Francis Powell	Succeeded by William Forsyth; Francis Powell
