= Baroness Campbell =

Baroness Campbell may refer to:

- Elspeth Campbell, Baroness Campbell of Pittenweem (born 1940), wife of Menzies Campbell
- Sue Campbell, Baroness Campbell of Loughborough (born 1948), British sports administrator
- Jane Campbell, Baroness Campbell of Surbiton (born 1959), British campaigner

== See also ==
- Baron Campbell (disambiguation)
- Lord Campbell (disambiguation)
