= Sight Scotland =

Charitable organization in Scotland

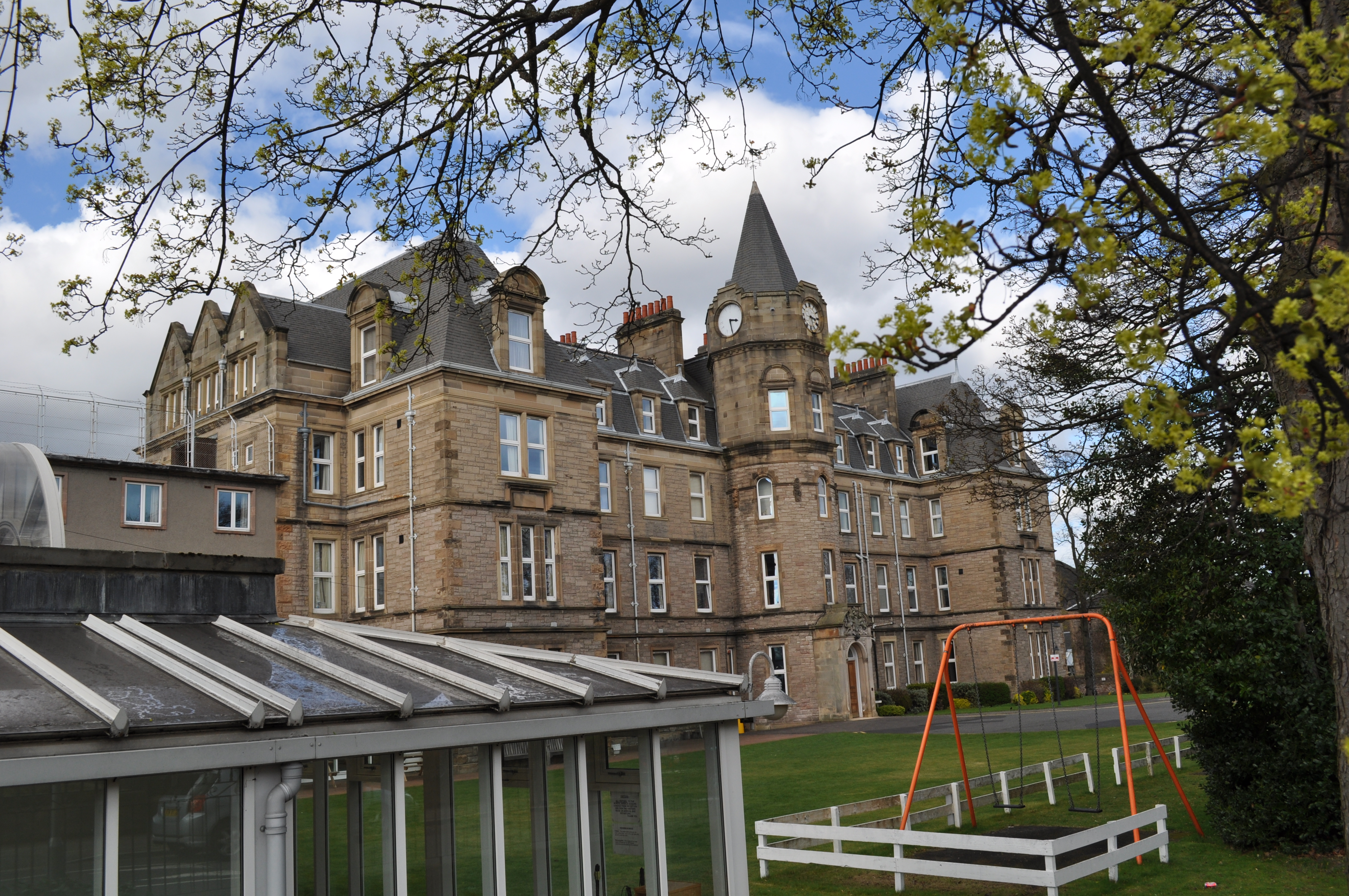
- Royal Blind School, Edinburgh, Craigmillar Park campus
- Formation: 1793; 233 years ago
- Founders: Thomas Blacklock * David Johnston * David Miller
- Location: Edinburgh, Scotland
- Formerly called: Royal Blind, Edinburgh Asylum for the Relief of the Indigent and Industrious Blind

Sight Scotland (formerly known as Royal Blind) is a Scottish Charity based in Edinburgh, Scotland founded in 1793. The charity provides care, education and employment for people of all ages who are blind or partially sighted. Sight Scotland provides the following services: Royal Blind School, Forward Vision, Scottish Braille Press and Kidscene. Sight Scotland’s sister charity is Sight Scotland Veterans.

== History ==
In 1793, Dr. David Johnston (Minister of North Leith), Dr. Thomas Blacklock, and Mr. David Miller founded Sight Scotland. Both Blacklock and Miller were blind. The organisation was founded under the name Edinburgh Asylum for the Relief of the Indigent and Industrious Blind and later was known as Royal Blind.

== Organisation ==
Sight Scotland is a national charity providing services to people from across Scotland and the rest of the UK. The charity’s headquarters are in Edinburgh, Scotland. Current services are provided in and around Edinburgh and Paisley.

== Governance ==
Management of the charity is the responsibility of the Board of Directors, made up of representatives of public bodies and elected nominees.

=== The Royal Blind School ===
The Royal Blind School (founded in 1793) is a specialist day and boarding school located in Edinburgh, Scotland. The school caters for pupils aged 3 to 19 who are blind or partially sighted. It has facilities for boys and girls of nursery, primary and secondary age. Students attending the school come primarily from Scotland, but also from other parts of the United Kingdom.

Famous alumni from the school include Libby Clegg, London 2012 Paralympic silver medalist, who is a brand ambassador for Sight Scotland.

=== Forward Vision ===
Forward Vision is a service for young adults aged 18–25 with visual impairment and disability based in Morningside, Edinburgh.

=== Care for older people ===
Braeside House is a purpose-built residential care home for older people who are registered blind or partially sighted. It was opened in 1999 and is located in Liberton, Edinburgh. It closed in 2021.

The success of Braeside, led to Sight Scotland opening a second care home, Jenny's Well in Paisley. This home was opened in 2017 with the aim to provide the West of Scotland with a care home specifically catering for the visually impaired. It closed in 2021.

=== Kidscene ===
Kidscene is an after school and holiday care facility based in the Sight Scotland School in Morningside, Edinburgh. Kidscene is for children with all abilities, using a reverse integration model to provide care for children with and without disabilities.

=== Scottish Braille Press ===
Founded in 1891, Scottish Braille Press produces alternative information formats for visually impaired people large print, Braille, and audio. It is also the host of National Braille Week.

=== Sight Scotland's sister charity, Sight Scotland Veterans ===
Sight Scotland Veterans supports former members of the armed forces who have a visual impairment. Any partially sighted person who has served in the armed forces is eligible for membership. This free service provides two key services to its members: The day centres of Linburn in Wilkieston and Hawkhead in Paisley and an Outreach Service covering Scotland.
