= John Harvey Astell =

British politician (1806–1887)

Member of Parliament for Ashburton
- In office 30 April 1859 – 12 July 1865
- Preceded by: George Mofatt
- Succeeded by: Robert Jardine

Member of Parliament for Cambridge
- In office 9 July 1852 – 1 March 1853 Serving with Kenneth Macaulay
- Preceded by: Robert Adair; William Campbell
- Succeeded by: Robert Adair; Francis Mowatt

Personal details
- Born: 20 March 1806
- Died: 17 January 1887 (aged 80)
- Party: Conservative

John Harvey Astell DL (20 March 1806 – 17 January 1887) was a British Conservative politician.

Astell was first elected as a Conservative MP for Cambridge in 1852, but his term was short-lived after, upon petition, he was unseated in March 1853, when the writ for the seat was also suspended. He later became MP for Ashburton in 1859 and held the seat until 1865 when he did not seek re-election.

Parliament of the United Kingdom
Preceded by George Mofatt	Member of Parliament for Ashburton; 1859–1865	Succeeded by Robert Jardine
Preceded by Robert Adair; William Campbell	Member of Parliament for Cambridge; 1852–1853; With: Kenneth Macaulay	Succeeded by Robert Adair; Francis Mowatt
