= Jervis-White-Jervis baronets =

Extinct baronetcy in the Baronetage of Ireland

The Jervis-White-Jervis Baronetcy, of Bally Ellis in the County Wexford, was a title in the Baronetage of Ireland. It was created on 6 December 1797 for John Jervis-White-Jervis. The 4th baronet was a colonel in the Royal Artillery. The title became extinct on the death of the fifth Baronet in 1947.

== Jervis-White-Jervis baronets, of Bally Ellis (1797) ==
- Sir John Jervis-White-Jervis, 1st Baronet (1765–1830)
- Sir Henry Meredyth Jervis-White-Jervis, 2nd Baronet (1793–1869)
- Sir Humphrey Charles Jervis-White-Jervis, 3rd Baronet (1821–1887)
- Sir John Henry Jervis-White-Jervis, 4th Baronet (1857–1943)
- Sir Henry Felix Jervis-White-Jervis, 5th Baronet (1859–1947)

== Arms ==
Coat of arms of Jervis-White-Jervis of Bally Ellis
Coronet Baron's coronet Crest 1st, A martlet Proper (Jervis); 2nd, Three arrows, two in saltire, points down, the other in fess, point to the dexter Gules, headed Or, flighted Argent (White) Escutcheon Quarterly, 1st and 4th: Sable, a chevron Ermine between three martlets Or (Jervis); 2nd and 3rd: Gules, a chevron Vair between three lions rampant Or, armed and langued Azure (White). Supporters Two lions Or, each gorged with a collar gemel Gules, and pendant therefrom a shield Ermine, the dexter shield charged with a bat’s wing as in the arms, and the sinister with a raven Sable. Motto Venale nec auro
