= John Jervis White Jervis =

Irish writer

Sir John Jervis White Jervis, 1st Baronet (1766–1830), originally John Jervis-White, was an Irish writer.

== Life ==
The eldest son of John Jervis-White of Bally Ellis, County Wexford, barrister-at-law, he was born 10 June 1766, and graduated B.A. as a fellow-commoner at Trinity College, Dublin. He became barrister-at-law and graduated LL.D.

By royal licence, Jervis-White assumed the name of Jervis in addition to that of White, and was created a baronet of Ireland 10 November 1797, the first of the Jervis-White-Jervis baronets. This was a reward for having in the previous year raised a corps of volunteers in Ireland, whom he equipped at his own expense. After the breakdown of the Peace of Amiens in 1803 he again raised and equipped a corps, the Somerset Riflemen, from his home in Clifton, Bristol. He died in 1830.

== Works ==
Jervis wrote:

- A Refutation of M. M. de Montgaillard's Calumnies against British Policy, and of his Display of the Situation of Great Britain in the year 1811, 1812.
- A Brief View of the Past and Present State of Ireland, Bath, 1813.
- A Brief Statement of the Rise, Progress, and Decline of the Ancient Christian Church, Dublin, 1813.

== Family ==
Jervis was twice married, and was succeeded by his eldest surviving son, Sir Henry Meredyth Jervis White Jervis (1793–1869), who was a commander in the Royal Navy.

== Notes ==
Attribution

This article incorporates text from a publication now in the public domain: Lee, Sidney, ed. (1892). "Jervis, John Jervis White". Dictionary of National Biography. Vol. 29. London: Smith, Elder & Co.

Baronetage of Ireland
New creation	Baronet (of Bally Ellis); 1797–1830	Succeeded by Henry Jervis-White-Jervis
