= North Leith Parish Church =

Church in Edinburgh, Scotland

Coordinates: 55°58′33″N 3°10′59″W

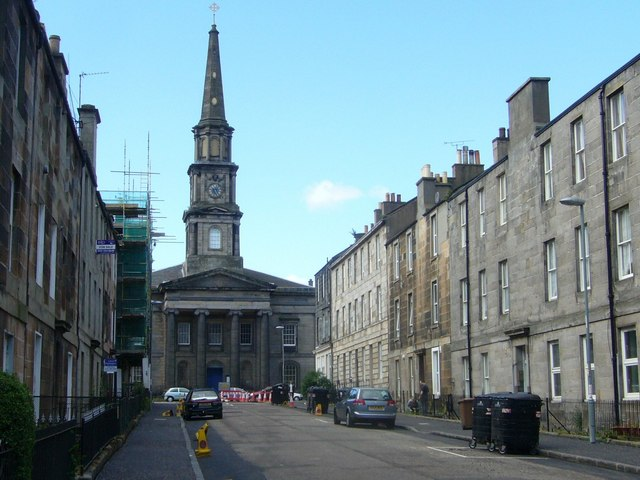
North Leith Parish Church at the end of Prince Regent Street

North Leith Parish Church was a congregation of the Church of Scotland, within the Presbytery of Edinburgh. It served part of Leith, formerly an independent burgh and since 1920 a part of the city of Edinburgh, Scotland.

== Building ==
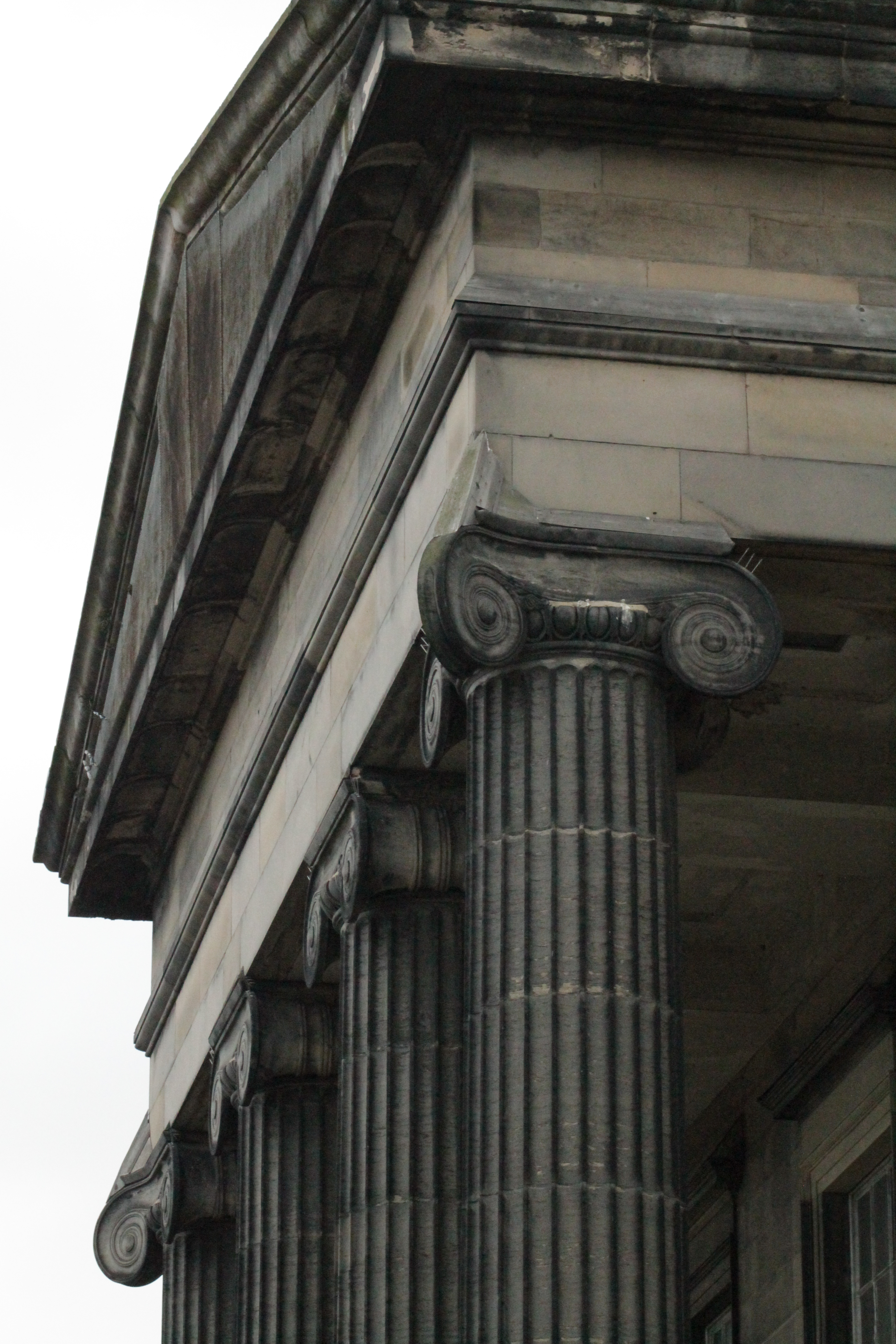
The portico at North Leith Parish Church

The current building in Madeira Street (opposite the junction with Prince Regent Street), Leith, was designed by the architect William Burn and was completed in 1816. It has a notable neo-classical portico (with four large Ionic columns), above which is a clock tower surmounted by a slender spire. A pipe organ (by Wadsworth of Manchester) was added in 1880. The building was damaged by bombing during World War II (in 1941), but was repaired by 1950. It is a category A listed building. The church was designed to accommodate 1300 people.

The associated manse (built in 1825 when the old manse on Quayside Street was abandoned) and known as "Leith Mount", stood on a substantial plot to the south-east of the church, on Ferry Road. The manse and its gardens and orchards were removed in 1920 to provide the site for Leith Theatre.

== History ==
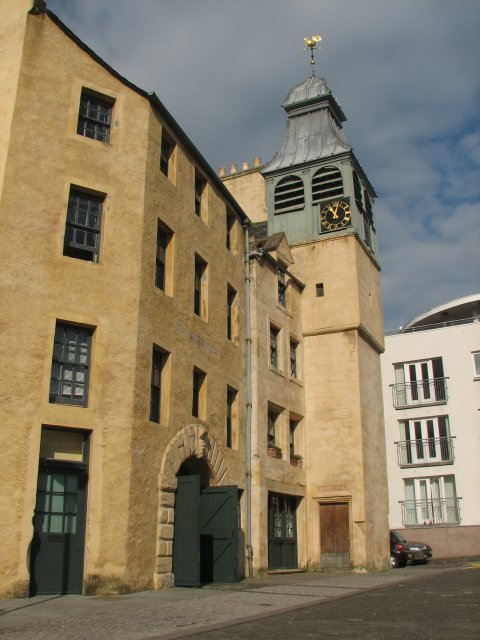
St Ninian's Manse incorporates the tower of the 17th-century former parish church.

The church connection dates to 1128, when King David I of Scotland granted lands for the construction of Holyrood Abbey. In 1493 Robert Bellenden, Abbot of Holyrood, built St Ninian's Chapel on the north-west bank of the Water of Leith, on lands owned by the Abbey. The small chapel was subsequently rebuilt after the Reformation. The replacement church opened in 1586, and later became the parish church of North Leith, which was created a quoad omnia parish, i.e. a civil and sacred parish, by a resolution of the Parliament of Scotland in 1606. A Dutch-style tower was added in 1675. The discovery of rot in this building in the 18th century led to extensive renovation and the construction of galleries within the building, but the church remained too small for the congregation, leading to its replacement by the current building in 1816 (then in fields just outside the built-up part of Leith). The Dutch-style tower of the old church still stands, although it was later incorporated into a mill. In the old churchyard of St.Ninians stands the altar tomb of Thomas Gladstones (1732 - 1809), a prosperous Leith merchant, and the grandfather of the famous Prime Minister William Ewart Gladstone. Thomas Gladstones was a church elder for the 'Hill' district of Leith for over 40 years.

At the point of the Disruption of 1843 North Leith parish was "vacant" (having no fixed minister) which seemed an encouragement to many to leave. North Leith Free Church was built on the corner of Coburg Street and North Junction Street, east of the church. 600 members of the congregation left, together with all the elders. The first minister was Rev William MacKenzie. The church could hold 1000 people. In 1857 Rev Robert MacDonald replaced MacKenzie. He organised the building of a magnificent new free church on Ferry Road, south of the original church. This was completed in 1859 and could hold 1100 people. The 1844 site was redeveloped as tenements. The 1859 church was demolished in 1981. A datestone was salvaged and re-used in the current church halls. North Leith Free Church no longer exists in any form. Rev Robert MacDonald served as Moderator of the General Assembly for the Free Church in 1882.

North Leith Parish Church united with Bonnington Church in 1968, creating Leith North & Bonnington Church (using the Madeira Street building). In 1982, Leith North & Bonnington Church further united with Leith St Ninian's Ferry Road Church, creating the current congregation with the historic name North Leith Parish Church.

The congregation merged with South Leith Parish Church to form North & South Leith Parish Church using the South Leith building in March 2024. The final Sunday worship service took place on 25 March 2024, in which other Leith congregations attended to commemorate two-hundred-and-eight years of continuous worship on Madiera Street. Despite this official occasion, the building was used once more on 29 March 2024: the five Church of Scotland churches in Leith each held an evening service, with congregations rotating around each church; North Leith hosted the Good Friday service.

== Parish ==
The parish largely consists of the north-west part of Leith, including the Fort housing scheme, Leith Docks, including the Ocean Terminal shopping centre, the Royal Yacht Britannia and the Scottish Government offices at Victoria Quay.

== Notable ministers ==
- Henry Charteris 1620 to 1627
- George Wishart 1638
- Andrew Fairfoul 1641 to 1652 – became Archbishop of Glasgow
- John Knox 1653 to 1662 (preached at the nearby Citadel when displaced by Cromwell's soldiers)
- Thomas Wilkie 1672 to 1682
- James Lundie 1687 to 1696
- David Johnston 1765 to 1824
- James Buchanan 1828 to 1840
- Andrew Wallace Williamson 1882 to 1883
- Hugh Osborne Douglas 1942 to 1951

== Burial ground ==
The 1493 church appears to have made use of the ancient burial ground of St Nicholas (around 100m north) until 1656 when the ground was built over to create the Citadel fortress. Nothing survives of this. The burial ground then moved to Coburg Street in 1664 (it is not clear where people were buried from 1656 until 1664). When the new church opened on Madeira Street it had little space for burial and families preferred to be buried with their family members on Coburg Street. The Coburg Street Burial Ground used to reach to the Water of Leith. A number of graves were lost due to the creation of the Water of Leith Walkway on the inner edge of the ground in 1981.

The Coburg St burial ground lies slightly detached from the old church, on Coburg Street. Notable interments include:

- Robert Nicoll, poet
- Rev David Johnston
- Colonel Anne Mackintosh, the only female military leader in the Jacobite rebellion

== See also ==
- List of Church of Scotland parishes
- South Leith Parish Church
