= Alan Campbell, Baron Campbell of Alloway =

British judge, barrister, & author (1917–2013)

The Right Honourable The Lord Campbell of Alloway ERD QC
- Campbell in 2012

Member of the House of Lords
- Lord Temporal
- Life peerage 2 June 1981 – 30 June 2013

Personal details
- Born: 24 May 1917
- Died: 30 June 2013 (aged 96)

Alan Robertson Campbell, Baron Campbell of Alloway ERD QC (24 May 1917 – 30 June 2013) was a British judge, barrister and author who sat in the House of Lords as a Conservative life peer.

The son of John Kenneth Campbell and Juliet Pinner, he was educated at Aldenham School, Hertfordshire, and Ecole des Sciences Politiques in Paris in 1934. He was further educated at Trinity Hall, Cambridge, where he graduated with Bachelor of Arts in economics and law in 1938, and with a Master of Arts. From 1939 to 1940, Campbell served in the Royal Artillery Supplementary Reserve, British Expeditionary Force, reaching the rank of Second Lieutenant, and was a Prisoner of War in Colditz Castle from 1940 to 1945. During his incarceration, Campbell's legal training came in very useful when he acted as defence counsel for a number of prisoners (notably Dominic Bruce) who faced charges from their German captors. Campbell received the Emergency Reserve Decoration (ERD) in 1996.

Called to the Bar by the Inner Temple in 1939, he was made a Queen's Counsel in 1965 and a Bencher in 1972. In 1975 Campbell became a member of the Management Committee of the United Kingdom Association for European Law, and in 1976 he was appointed Recorder of the Crown Court, holding both posts until 1989. From 1974 to 1979 he was a member of the Law Advisory Panel of British Council, from 1988 to 1991 he was vice-president of the Association des Juristes Franco-Britanniques and from 1978 to 2004 President of the Colditz Association. On 2 June 1981, he was created a life peer with the title Baron Campbell of Alloway, of Ayr in the District of Kyle and Carrick. He sat as a Conservative and was a member of the Scottish Peers' Association.

In 1947 Campbell married Diana Watson-Smyth. Divorced in 1953, he married secondly Vivien de Kantzow (died 27 December 2010) in 1957. He married for the third time at the age of 94 on 1 September 2011, in the Chapel of the Royal Hospital Chelsea, Dorothea Berwick, daughter of the late Colonel Edward and Lady Elizabeth Berwick. He had one daughter, the Hon. Sarah C. Campbell (b. 1950), by his first wife.

Following the death of Edward Short, Baron Glenamara in May 2012, Campbell became the oldest sitting member of the House of Lords.

== Works ==
- Restrictive Trade Practices and Monopolies (1956)
- Restrictive Trading Agreements in the Common Market (1964)
- Industrial Relations Act (1971)
- EC Competitions Law (1980)
- Trade Unions and the Individual (1980)

Case-Book, Sentence of Death (2008)
