= John Campbell, 1st Baron Campbell =

Scottish politician (1779–1861)

The Right Honourable The Lord Campbell PC FRSE
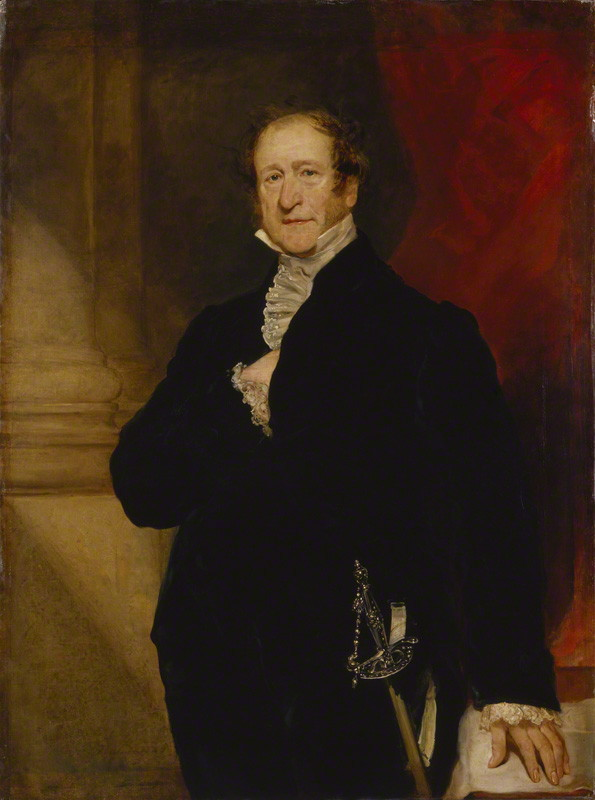
- Lord Campbell by Thomas Woolnoth c. 1851

Lord Chancellor
- In office 18 June 1859 – 23 June 1861
- Monarch: Victoria
- Prime Minister: The Viscount Palmerston
- Preceded by: The Lord Chelmsford
- Succeeded by: The Lord Westbury

Lord High Chancellor of Ireland
- In office June 1841 – June 1841
- Monarch: Victoria
- Prime Minister: The Viscount Melbourne
- Preceded by: The Lord Plunket
- Succeeded by: Sir Edward Sugden

Chancellor of the Duchy of Lancaster
- In office 6 July 1846 – 5 March 1850
- Monarch: Victoria
- Prime Minister: Lord John Russell
- Preceded by: Lord Granville Somerset
- Succeeded by: The Earl of Carlisle

Chief Justice, Queen's Bench
- In office 5 March 1850 – 24 June 1859
- Monarch: Victoria
- Preceded by: The Lord Denman
- Succeeded by: Sir Alexander Cockburn, Bt

Personal details
- Born: 15 September 1779 Cupar, Fife, UK
- Died: 23 June 1861 (aged 81) Stratheden House, Knightsbridge, London SW7
- Party: Whig; Liberal
- Spouse: Mary Scarlett (m. 1821; died 1860)
- Children: 7, including William
- Education: United College, St Andrews

John Campbell, 1st Baron Campbell, PC, FRSE (15 September 1779 – 23 June 1861) was a British Liberal politician, lawyer and man of letters.

== Background and education ==
The second son of the Reverend George Campbell, D.D., and Magdalene Hallyburton, he was born a son of the manse at Cupar, Fife, Scotland, where his father was for fifty years parish minister. For seven years, from the age of 11, Campbell studied at the United College, St Andrews.

When he was 18, he was offered the opportunity to leave home and see something of the world by becoming tutor to James Wedderburn-Webster. The family lived in Clapham, just south of London, with a summer house at Shenley, Hertfordshire. His employer was David Webster, London merchant of a sugar trading house, with family connections through the Wedderburn baronets to the slave plantations of Jamaica. Living in this wealthy household, the young Campbell saw a different world, and it didn't impress him: the commercial conversation and gossip of "West India merchants and East India captains" created an atmosphere "irksome" and "unbearable". His pupil James was about ten years old; one of Campbell's first tasks was to begin to teach him Latin.

Campbell took advantage of being in London to attend a session of the House of Commons, hearing William Wilberforce speak against slavery, followed by Charles James Fox and William Pitt. He describes it vividly in his memoirs forty years later, concluding, "After hearing this debate, I could no longer have been content with being 'Moderator of the General Assembly [of the Church of Scotland]'.".

In 1800 Campbell was entered as a student at Lincoln's Inn, and, after working briefly for the Morning Chronicle, was called to the bar in 1806.

== Legal and political career ==
Campbell at once began to report cases decided at nisi prius (i.e. on jury trial). Of these reports he published four volumes; they extend from Michaelmas 1807 to Hilary 1816. Campbell also devoted himself to criminal business, but failed to attract much attention behind the bar. It was not until 1827 that Campbell took silk and began to develop political aspirations. He had unsuccessfully contested the borough of Stafford in 1826, but was returned for it in 1830 and again in 1831. He stood as a moderate Whig, in favour of the connection of church and state and opposed to triennial parliaments and the secret ballot. His main object, like Lord Brougham, was the amelioration of the law by the abolition of cumbrous technicalities rather than the assertion of new principles.

To this end his name is associated with the Fines and Recoveries Abolition Act 1833; the Inheritance Act 1833; the Dower Act 1833; the Real Property Limitation Act 1833; the Wills Act 1837; the Copyhold Tenure Act 1841; and the Judgments Act 1838. The second was called for by the preference which the common law gave to a distant collateral over the brother of the half-blood of the first purchaser; the fourth conferred an indefeasible title on adverse possession for twenty years (a term shortened by Lord Cairns in 1875 to twelve years); the fifth reduced the number of witnesses required by law to attest wills, and removed the distinction which existed in this respect between freeholds and copyholds; the last freed an innocent debtor from imprisonment only before final judgment (or on what was termed mesne process), but the principle stated by Campbell that only fraudulent debtors should be imprisoned was ultimately given effect to for England and Wales in 1869.

Perhaps his most important appearance as a member of parliament (MP) for Stafford was in defence of Lord John Russell's first Reform Bill (1831). In a speech, based on Charles James Fox's declaration against constitution-mongering, he supported both the enfranchising and the disfranchising clauses. The following year (1832) found Campbell Solicitor General, a knight and member for Dudley. Dudley had been enfranchised under the Reform Act 1832 and so Campbell became the first MP to represent the town in modern history. However, his appointment to the post of Attorney General in 1834 led to a by-election, which he lost to Thomas Hawkes. John Campbell returned to Parliament swiftly, however, as he was returned by Edinburgh in 1835, which seat he represented until his ennoblement in 1841. One of his first acts as Attorney General was the prosecution of a bookseller called Henry Hetherington on the charge of blasphemous libel. In this case Campbell gave his opinion that morality depended on divine revelation:

the vast majority of the population believe that morality depends entirely on revelation; and if a doubt could be raised among them that the ten commandments were given by God from Mount Sinai, men would think they were at liberty to steal, and women would think themselves absolved from the restraints of chastity.

In 1840 Campbell conducted the prosecution against John Frost, one of the three Chartist leaders who attacked the town of Newport, all of whom were found guilty of high treason. Next year, as the Melbourne administration was near its close, Plunkett, the Lord Chancellor of Ireland, was forced to resign, and was succeeded by Campbell, who was raised to the peerage as Baron Campbell, of St Andrews in the County of Fife. The post of chancellor Campbell held for only sixteen days, and then resigned it to his successor Sir Edward Sugden. It was during the period 1841–1849, when he had no legal duty, except the self-imposed one of occasionally hearing Scottish appeals in the House of Lords, that Lord Campbell turned to literary pursuits. He bought Hartrigge House in Jedburgh during this period. However, he did take up the cause of the families of railway accident victims in introducing and steering through the Commons, the Fatal Accidents Act 1846, known as Lord Campbell's Act.

== Literary endeavours ==
Following in the path struck out by Strickland in her Lives of the Queens of England, and by Lord Brougham's Lives of Eminent Statesmen, Campbell produced Lives of the Lord Chancellors and Keepers of the Great Seal of England, from the earliest times till the reign of Queen Victoria, in ten volumes. He followed it with Lives of the Chief Justices of England, in four volumes (two additional volumes were a "Continuation by Sir Joseph Arnould – Late Judge of the High Court of Bombay"). He also wrote Shakespeare's Legal Acquirements Reconsidered.

== In the House of Lords ==
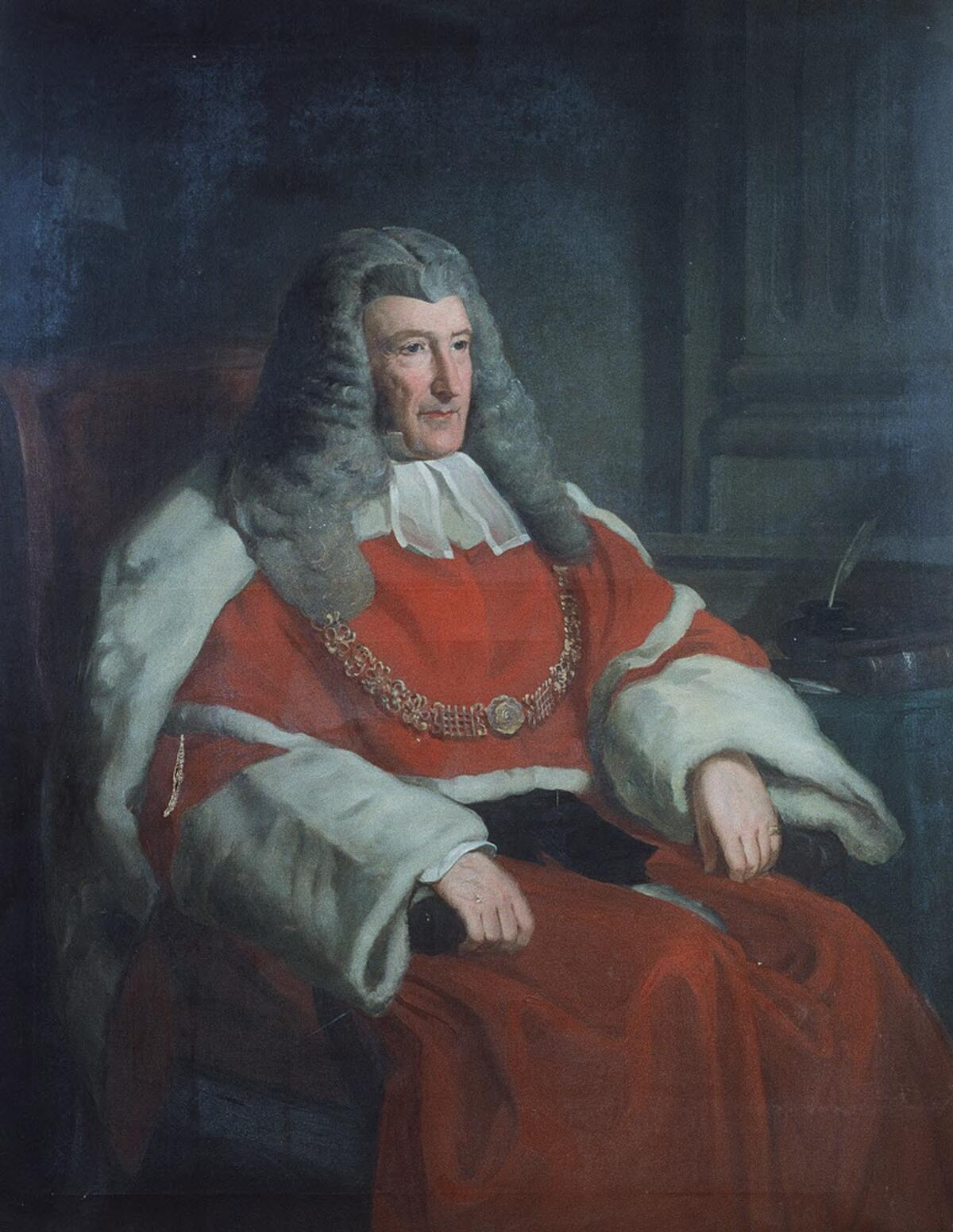
Lord Campbell as Lord Chief Justice

While composing his biographical works Campbell remained active in the House of Lords and spoke frequently against legislation proposed by Sir Robert Peel's government. When the Whigs returned to power under Russell in 1846, Campbell became a member of the cabinet as Chancellor of the Duchy of Lancaster, and undertook some of the duties of the ailing Lord Chancellor, Lord Cottenham. On the resignation of Lord Denman in 1850, Campbell was appointed Chief Justice of the Queen's Bench. Although well versed in the common law, Campbell was criticised for attempting to influence juries in their estimate of the credibility of evidence, as was seen in the 1852 Achilli case. He assisted in the reforms of special pleading at Westminster, and had a recognised place with Brougham and Lyndhurst in legal discussions in the House of Lords.

In 1854, Campbell was appointed to the Royal Commission for Consolidating the Statute Law, a royal commission to consolidate existing statutes and enactments of English law.

Campbell was the main sponsor of the Obscene Publications Act 1857 which made the sale of obscene material a statutory offence for the first time, giving the courts power to seize and destroy offending material. The origins of the Act itself were in a trial for the sale of pornography presided over by Campbell, at the same time as a debate in the House of Lords over a bill aiming to restrict the sale of poisons. Campbell was taken by the analogy between the two situations, famously referring to the London pornography trade as "a sale of poison more deadly than prussic acid, strychnine or arsenic". Campbell proposed a bill to restrict the sale of pornography; giving statutory powers of destruction would allow for a much more effective degree of prosecution. The bill was controversial at the time, receiving strong opposition from both Houses of Parliament, and was passed on the assurance by Campbell, in his capacity of Lord Chief Justice, that it was "... intended to apply exclusively to works written for the single purpose of corrupting the morals of youth and of a nature calculated to shock the common feelings of decency in any well-regulated mind." The House of Commons successfully amended it so as not to apply to Scotland, on the grounds that Scottish common law was sufficiently stringent.

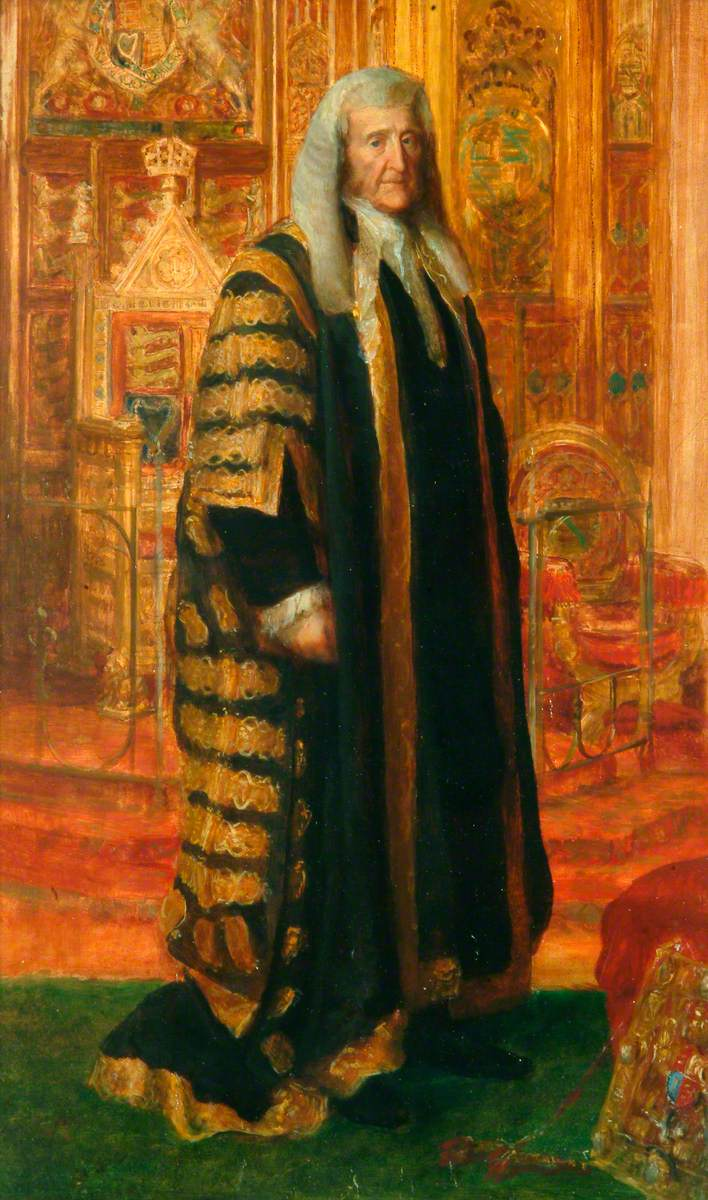
Lord Campbell as Lord Chancellor, by George Frederic Watts

The Act provided for the seizure and destruction of any material deemed to be obscene, and held for sale or distribution, following information being laid before a "court of summary jurisdiction" (magistrates' court). The Act required that following evidence of a common-law offence being committed – for example, on the report of a plain-clothes policeman who had successfully purchased the material – the court could issue a warrant for the premises to be searched and the material seized. The proprietor then would be called upon to attend court and give reason why the material should not be destroyed. Critically, the Act did not define "obscene," leaving this to the will of the courts.

In 1859 Campbell was made Lord High Chancellor of Great Britain, possibly on the understanding that Bethell should succeed as soon as he could be spared from the House of Commons. His short tenure was undistinguished, and he died in 1861.

== Family ==
In 1821 Campbell married the Hon. Mary Elizabeth, eldest daughter of James Scarlett, 1st Baron Abinger; they had three sons and four daughters. In 1836 Lady Campbell was created (in her own right) Baroness Stratheden, of Cupar in the County of Fife, in recognition of her husband's withdrawal of his claim to the office of Master of the Rolls; she died in March 1860, aged 63. Lord Campbell survived her by just over a year and died in June 1861, aged 81. They were succeeded by their eldest son, William, who became Lord Stratheden and Campbell.

Parliament of the United Kingdom
Preceded by Thomas Beaumont; Ralph Benson	Member of Parliament for Stafford; 1830–1832; With: Thomas Gisborne	Succeeded by William Fawkener Chetwynd; Rees Howell Gronow
New constituency	Member of Parliament for Dudley; 1832–1834	Succeeded by Thomas Hawkes
Preceded by Francis Jeffrey; James Abercromby	Member of Parliament for Edinburgh; 1834–1841; With: James Abercromby to 1839; Thomas Babington Macaulay from 1839	Succeeded by Sir William Gibson Craig, Bt; Thomas Babington Macaulay
Legal offices
Preceded by Sir William Horne	Solicitor General; 1832–1834	Succeeded by Sir Charles Pepys
Preceded by Sir William Horne	Attorney General; 1834	Succeeded by Sir Frederick Pollock
Preceded by Sir Frederick Pollock	Attorney General; 1835–1841	Succeeded by Sir Thomas Wilde
Preceded by The Lord Plunket	Lord High Chancellor of Ireland; 1841	Succeeded by Sir Edward Sugden
Preceded by Thomas Denman	Lord Chief Justice, Queen's Bench; 1850–1859	Succeeded by Alexander Cockburn
Political offices
Preceded by Lord Granville Somerset	Chancellor of the Duchy of Lancaster; 1846–1850	Succeeded by The Earl of Carlisle
Preceded by The Lord Chelmsford	Lord High Chancellor of Great Britain; 1859–1861	Succeeded by The Lord Westbury
Peerage of the United Kingdom
New creation	Baron Campbell; 1841–1861	Succeeded by William Campbell
