= William Campbell, 2nd Baron Stratheden and Campbell =

British peer and politician (1824-1893)

The Right Honourable The Lord Stratheden and Campbell
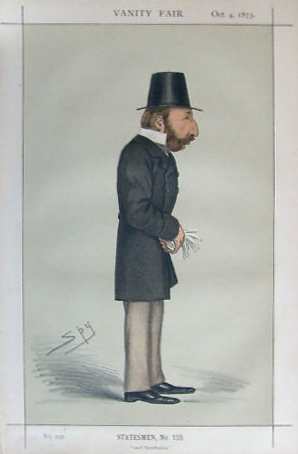
- as caricatured by Spy (Leslie Ward) in Vanity Fair, October 1873

Member of Parliament for Harwich
- In office 1859–1860
- Preceded by: Robert John Bagshaw
- Succeeded by: Richard Rowley

Personal details
- Born: 15 October 1824
- Died: 21 January 1893 (aged 68) Wandsworth
- Party: Liberal
- Education: Eton College, Balliol College, Oxford and Trinity College, Cambridge

William Frederick Campbell, 2nd Baron Stratheden, 2nd Baron Campbell (15 October 1824 – 21 January 1893), was a British peer and Liberal politician. His father was the Lord Chancellor.

== Background ==
Stratheden and Campbell was the eldest son of Lord Chancellor John Campbell, 1st Baron Campbell, and Mary Elizabeth, 1st Baroness Stratheden, daughter of James Scarlett, 1st Baron Abinger. He was educated at Eton College and Balliol College, Oxford and Trinity College, Cambridge. He was awarded his M.A. in 1846.

== Political career ==
Stratheden and Campbell was elected Member of Parliament for Cambridge in 1847, a seat he held until 1852, and later represented Harwich from 1859 to 1860. The latter year he succeeded his mother in the barony of Stratheden and entered the House of Lords. The following year he also inherited the barony of Campbell on the death of his father.

== Personal life ==
Lord Stratheden and Campbell dined at the Reform Club and had residences at Hartrigge House in Jedburgh and Stratheden House in Knightsbridge. He died at Wandsworth, Surrey, on 15 January 1893, aged 66. He never married and was succeeded in the baronies by his younger brother, Hallyburton.

Parliament of the United Kingdom
Preceded by Hon. John Manners-Sutton; Sir Fitzroy Kelly	Member of Parliament for Cambridge; 1847 – 1852; With: Robert Adair	Succeeded by Kenneth Macaulay; John Harvey Astell
Preceded by Robert John Bagshaw; Henry Jervis-White-Jervis	Member of Parliament for Harwich; 1859 – 1860; With: Henry Jervis-White-Jervis	Succeeded by Henry Jervis-White-Jervis; Richard Rowley
Peerage of the United Kingdom
Preceded by Mary Campbell	Baron Stratheden; 1860 – 1893	Succeeded by Hallyburton George Campbell
Preceded by John Campbell	Baron Campbell; 1861 – 1893	Succeeded by Hallyburton George Campbell
