= Baron Stratheden =

Barony in the Peerage of the United Kingdom

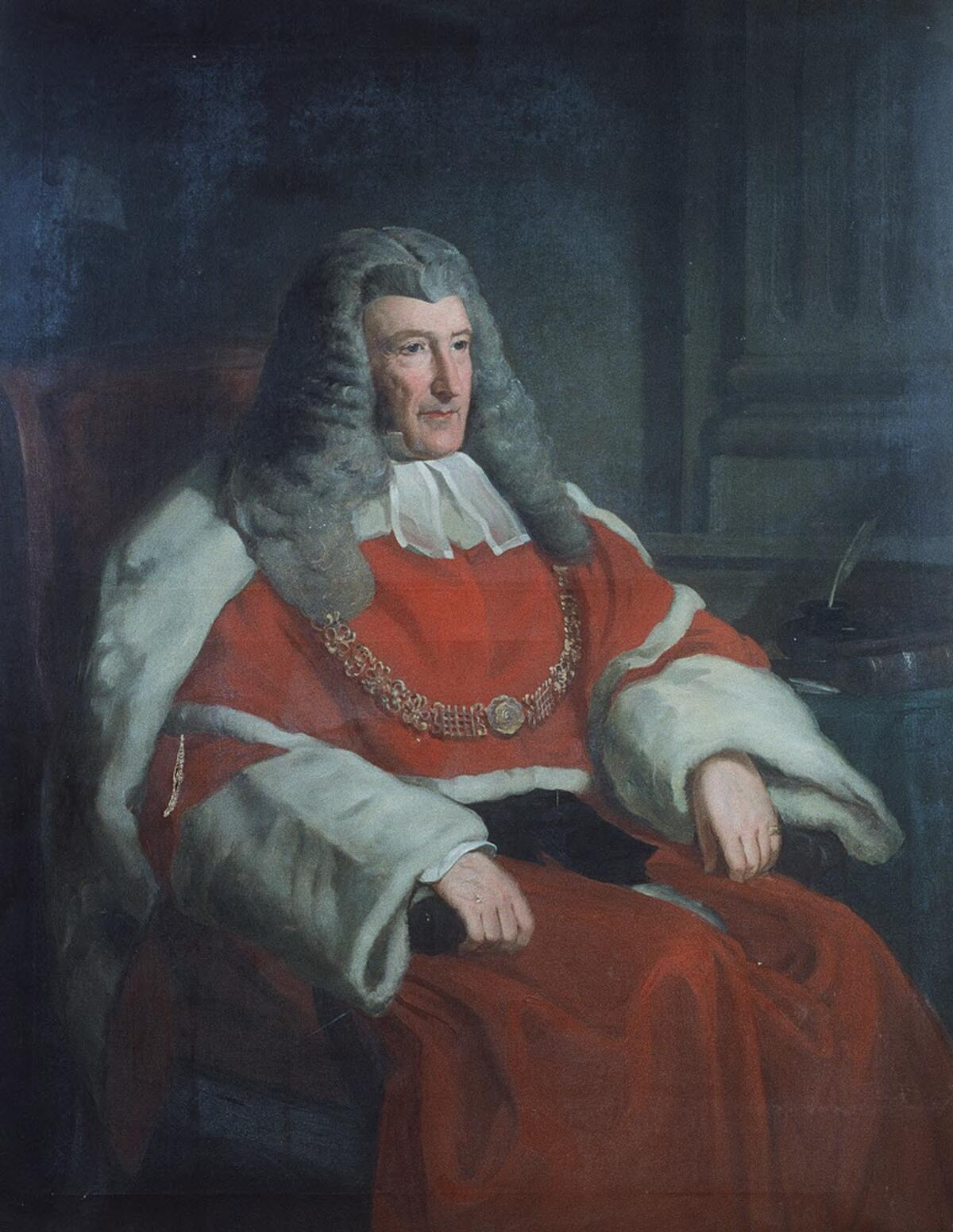
John Campbell, 1st Baron Campbell

Baron Stratheden, of Cupar in the County of Fife, and Baron Campbell, of St Andrews in the County of Fife, are two titles in the Peerage of the United Kingdom. The titles were created in 1836 and 1841 respectively. The barony of Stratheden was created for the Hon. Mary, Lady Campbell, wife of the prominent lawyer and Whig politician Sir John Campbell, and daughter of James Scarlett, 1st Baron Abinger. Sir John Campbell, who in 1836 served as Attorney-General in the Whig administration of Lord Melbourne, had twice been overlooked for the office of Master of the Rolls, and was about to tender his resignation to Melbourne as a result of this. However, he was talked out of resigning when it was decided that, in recognition of the value of his services, his wife should be raised to the peerage. Five years later he was himself created Baron Campbell on his appointment as Lord Chancellor of Ireland. He later held office as Lord High Chancellor of Great Britain.

Both Lady Stratheden and Lord Campbell were succeeded by their eldest son, the second Baron. He had previously represented Cambridge and Harwich in the House of Commons as a Liberal. He never married and was succeeded by his younger brother, the third Baron. On his death the titles passed to his grandson, the fourth Baron. He was a Brigadier in the army. He had no sons and was succeeded by his younger brother, the fifth Baron. As of 2017 the titles are held by the latter's grandson, the seventh Baron, who succeeded in 2011.

== Barons Stratheden (1836) ==
Arms of the Lord Stratheden and Campbell

- Mary Elizabeth Campbell, 1st Baroness Stratheden (1796–1860)
- William Frederick Campbell, 2nd Baron Stratheden and Campbell (1824–1893)
- Hallyburton George Campbell, 3rd Baron Stratheden and Campbell (1829–1918)
  - Hon. John Beresford Campbell (1866–1915)
  - Donald Campbell (1896–1916)
- Alistair Campbell, 4th Baron Stratheden and Campbell (1899–1981)
- Gavin Campbell, 5th Baron Stratheden and Campbell (1901–1987)
- Donald Campbell, 6th Baron Stratheden and Campbell (1934–2011)
- David Anthony Campbell, 7th Baron Stratheden and Campbell (b. 1963)

There is no heir to the baronies.

== Barons Campbell (1841) ==
- John Campbell, 1st Baron Campbell (1779–1861)
- William Frederick Campbell, 2nd Baron Stratheden and Campbell (1824–1893)

see above for further holders

== See also ==
- Baron Abinger
