= General Secretary of the Scottish Trades Union Congress =

The General Secretary of the STUC is the chief permanent officer of the Scottish Trades Union Congress, and a major figure in the trade union movement in the United Kingdom.

The Secretary is responsible for the effective operation of the STUC and for leading implementation of policies set by the annual Congress and the organisation's General Council. They also serve as the STUC's chief representative, both with the public and with other organisations.

The position was formed in 1922, when the Parliamentary Committee of the STUC became the General Council. The position of Secretary has been a permanent, full-time position in the TUC since that time. Before that, the Secretary was elected annually at Congress.

== Secretaries of the Parliamentary Committee of the STUC ==
1897: Margaret Irwin
1900: George Carson
1918: Robert Allan

== General Secretaries of the STUC ==
1922: William Elger
1947: Charles Murdoch
1949: George Middleton
1963: James Jack
1975: James Milne
1986: Campbell Christie
1998: Bill Speirs
2006: Grahame Smith
2020: Rozanne Foyer

== Deputy General Secretaries of the STUC ==
1969: James Milne
1975: James Kirkwood
1978: John Henry
1988: Bill Speirs
1998: Grahame Smith and Ronnie McDonald
2006: Dave Moxham
2020: Dave Moxham and Linda Somerville

== Presidents of the STUC ==
| Year | Name | Union |
|---|---|---|
| 1897 | Duncan Macpherson | Glasgow Trades Council |
| 1898 | John Keir | Aberdeen Trades Council |
| 1899 | Thomas McBurney | Dundee Trades Council |
| 1900 | Thomas Wilson | Operative Bakers' National Federal Union of Scotland |
| 1901 | John Kent | Scottish Typographical Association |
| 1902 | William Muirhead | Associated Ironmoulders of Scotland |
| 1903 | Robert Smillie | Scottish Miners' Federation |
| 1904 | George Murdoch | Perth Trades Council |
| 1905 | Robert Smillie | Scottish Miners' Federation |
| 1906 | William Johnston | Aberdeen Trades Council |
| 1907 | John T. Howden | Associated Carpenters and Joiners of Scotland |
| 1908 | James Gavin | Amalgamated Society of Steel and Iron Workers of Great Britain |
| 1909 | James Gavin | Amalgamated Society of Steel and Iron Workers of Great Britain |
| 1910 | John C. Hendry | Brechin Mill and Factory Operatives Trade Union |
| 1911 | James Brown | Scottish Miners' Federation |
| 1912 | David Palmer | Aberdeen Trades Council |
| 1913 | Alexander R. Turner | Glasgow Trades Council |
| 1914 | Robert Climie | Ayrshire Trades Council |
| 1916 | David Gilmour | Scottish Miners' Federation |
| 1917 | Robert Allan | Edinburgh Trades Council |
| 1918 | Hugh Lyon | Scottish Horse and Motormen's Association |
| 1919 | Neil S. Beaton | National Amalgamated Union of Shop Assistants |
| 1920 | William Shaw | Glasgow Trades Council |
| 1921 | James Walker | Iron and Steel Trades Confederation |
| 1922 | Charles Gallie | Railway Clerks' Association |
| 1923 | James Murdoch | Scottish Miners' Federation |
| 1924 | Tom Wilson | National Amalgamated Union of Shop Assistants |
| 1925 | William Leonard | National Amalgamated Furnishing Trades Association |
| 1926 | Joseph Forbes Duncan | Scottish Farm Servants' Union |
| 1927 | Peter Webster | Scottish Horse and Motormen's Association |
| 1928 | John Nairn | Scottish Textile Workers' Union |
| 1929 | George Kerr | Workers' Union |
| 1930 | Robert Watson | Scottish Typographical Association |
| 1931 | Charles Gallie | Railway Clerks' Association |
| 1932 | William Leonard | National Amalgamated Furnishing Trades Association |
| 1933 | James Crawford | National Society of Operative Printers' Assistants |
| 1934 | Thomas Scollan | Glasgow Trades Council |
| 1935 | Thomas Brown | National Amalgamated Union of Shop Assistants |
| 1936 | James Young | Association of Engineering and Shipbuilding Draughtsmen |
| 1937 | Bell Jobson | Scottish Farm Servants' Union |
| 1938 | Herbert Ellison | National Union of Railwaymen |
| 1939 | Robert Taylor | Scottish Horse and Motormen's Association |
| 1940 | William Quin | National Union of General and Municipal Workers |
| 1941 | James Watson | National Union of Distributive and Allied Workers |
| 1942 | Charles Murdoch | Scottish Union of Bakers, Confectioners and Bakery Workers |
| 1943 | Peter Henderson | Scottish Miners' Federation |
| 1944 | James Crawford | National Society of Operative Printers' Assistants |
| 1945 | James Young | Association of Engineering and Shipbuilding Draughtsmen |
| 1946 | Jim Campbell | National Union of Railwaymen |
| 1947 | James Duncan | Constructional Engineering Union |
| 1948 | John Sullivan | Transport and General Workers' Union |
| 1949 | William McGinniss | National Union of General and Municipal Workers |
| 1950 | William Pearson | National Union of Scottish Mineworkers |
| 1951 | John Lang | Iron and Steel Trades Confederation |
| 1952 | John Brannigan | Scottish Horse and Motormen's Association |
| 1953 | Archibald MacKellar | Association of Engineering and Shipbuilding Draughtsmen |
| 1954 | John Bothwell | Transport Salaried Staffs' Association |
| 1955 | Thomas B. Meikle | Transport and General Workers' Union |
| 1956 | David Currie | Clerical and Administrative Workers' Union |
| 1957 | Frank Donachy | National Union of Railwaymen |
| 1958 | William Mowbray | Scottish Union of Bakers and Allied Workers |
| 1959 | Alex Moffat | National Union of Scottish Mineworkers |
| 1960 | Jimmy Milne | Aberdeen Trades Council |
| 1961 | Edward W. Craig | Union of Shop, Distributive and Allied Workers |
| 1962 | Patrick Conner | Amalgamated Engineering Union |
| 1963 | David Lauder | National Union of Railwaymen |
| 1964 | Frank H. Stephen | Draughtsmen's and Allied Technicians' Association |
| 1965 | William Scholes | Transport and General Workers' Union |
| 1966 | Alec Kitson | Scottish Commercial Motormen's Union |
| 1967 | Bill McLean | National Union of Scottish Mineworkers |
| 1968 | John Irvine | Iron and Steel Trades Confederation |
| 1969 | Enoch Humphries | Fire Brigades Union |
| 1970 | John A. Matheson | National Union of Railwaymen |
| 1971 | Alex M. Donnet | National Union of General and Municipal Workers |
| 1972 | Raymond Macdonald | Transport and General Workers' Union |
| 1973 | Alexander Day | Association of Scientific, Technical and Managerial Staffs |
| 1974 | Elizabeth McIntyre | National Union of Hosiery and Knitwear Workers |
| 1975 | James H. Dollan | National Union of Journalists |
| 1976 | Andrew Forman | Union of Shop, Distributive and Allied Workers |
| 1977 | Hugh D'Arcy | Union of Construction, Allied Trades and Technicians |
| 1978 | Arthur Bell | Iron and Steel Trades Confederation |
| 1979 | Charles Drury | National and Local Government Officers' Association |
| 1980 | Bill Dougan | Amalgamated Society of Boilermakers |
| 1981 | Jimmy Morrell | National Union of General and Municipal Workers |
| 1982 | John D. Pollock | Educational Institute of Scotland |
| 1983 | Andy Barr | National Union of Railwaymen |
| 1984 | John Langan | Association of Scientific, Technical and Managerial Staffs |
| 1985 | Tom Dougan | Amalgamated Engineering Union |
| 1986 | Hugh Wyper | Transport and General Workers Union |
| 1987 | Ron Curran | National Union of Public Employees |
| 1988 | Charles Gallagher | National and Local Government Officers Association |
| 1989 | Ronnie Webster | Aberdeen Trades Council |
| 1990 | George Bolton | National Union of Mineworkers |
| 1991 | Clive Lewis | Iron and Steel Trades Confederation |
| 1992 | Jane McKay | Glasgow Trades Council |
| 1993 | Chris Binks | Confederation of Health Service Employees |
| 1994 | Harry McLevy | Amalgamated Engineering and Electrical Union |
| 1995 | Willie Queen | Transport and General Workers Union |
| 1996 | Pat McCormick | Union of Shop, Distributive and Allied Workers |
| 1997 | Mary Harrison | GMB Union |
| 1998 | Pat Kelly | National Union of Civil and Public Servants |
| 1999 | Anne Middleton | Unison |
| 2000 | Matt Smith | Unison |
| 2001 | Liz Elkind | Edinburgh Trades Council |
| 2002 | David Bleiman | Association of University Teachers |
| 2003 | Pauline Frazer | Amalgamated Engineering and Electrical Union |
| 2004 | Sandy Boyle | UNIFI |
| 2005 | Anne Douglas | Prospect |
| 2006 | John Keenan | South Lanarkshire and East Kilbride TUC |
| 2007 | Katrina Purcell | Unison |
| 2008 | Phil McGarry | National Union of Rail, Maritime and Transport Workers |
| 2009 | Fiona Farmer | Unite |
| 2010 | Martin Keenan | Communication Workers' Union |
| 2011 | Joy Dunn | Public and Commercial Services Union |
| 2012 | Mike Kirby | Unison |
| 2013 | Agnes Tolmie | Unite |
| 2014 | Harry Frew | Union of Construction, Allied Trades and Technicians |
| 2015 | Lawrence Wason | Union of Shop, Distributive and Allied Workers |
| 2016 | Helen Connor | Educational Institute of Scotland |
| 2017 | Satnam Ner | Prospect |
| 2018 | Lynn Henderson | Public and Commercial Services Union |
| 2019 | Jackson Cullinane | Unite |
| 2020 | Mary Senior | University and College Union |
| 2021 | Pat Rafferty | Unite |
| 2022 | Pauline Rourke | Communication Workers' Union |
| 2023 | Mike Arnott | Dundee Trades Union Council |
| 2024 | Lillian Macer | Unison |
| 2025 | Richard Hardy | Prospect |
| 2026 | Jenny Douglas | Unite |
