= Scottish football referee strike =

2010 strike in Scotland

The Scottish football referee strike refers to the unprecedented withdrawal of services by top level referees in Scottish football, following a dispute between the Scottish Senior Football Referees' Association and the Scottish Football Association. It affected 20 matches scheduled for the weekend of 27/28 November 2010 in the Scottish Premier League, the Scottish Football League, the Scottish Cup, as well as the 2010 Scottish Challenge Cup Final. When combined with significant weather disruption, the effect of the strike was that only four games went ahead, all in the SPL on 27 November, using replacement referees drawn from Israel, Luxembourg and Malta. It was the first time since 1905 that a domestic Scottish match had been refereed by someone from outside Scotland.

The dispute centred on perceptions that the SFA was not doing enough to protect referees from undue criticism from football clubs, leading to increasing fears for personal safety as controversial decisions were debated by the media and fans. After referee Dougie McDonald was found to have lied to his supervisor and Celtic manager Neil Lennon after a game on 17 October 2010, the ensuing controversy and debate led to referees voting to strike on 21 November in an attempt to achieve substantial changes in the game. Immediately after the strike, McDonald opted for early retirement, to allow the ongoing dispute to focus on the issues at hand.

== Background ==
As a commercially separate entity, the referees for the SPL are provided under contract from the SFA. Until the 2010 dispute, there had never been a referees strike before in Scottish football. Scottish referees are not fully professional, and instead are paid on a match fee basis, currently set at £800 and equating to a maximum expected income of £10,000 a year according to ex-referee Stuart Dougal.

In 2008, a strike over match fees threatening the start of the 2008–09 season was averted when the Scottish Senior Referees' Association and the SPL agreed to benchmark SPL referees pay to that of other European leagues. At the time it was acknowledged that the dispute was not only related to pay parity, but also about questions over their authority, with Jim Traynor commenting that referees saw a "need to be protected from chairman and managers who question their honesty and integrity".

In December 2008, after several SPL managers were rebuked by the SPL and SFA for critical comments about referees, all SPL managers signed an agreement to stop discussing refereeing decisions after matches. According to Rangers manager Walter Smith, the agreement was a "show of intent from managers that there is an acceptance that there are too many headlines being grabbed by the fact that we may be a little critical of referees at times", while the then Celtic manager Gordon Strachan stated "we think we should take the pressure off referees a bit", and "Whether it works or not, I don't know, but it's worth a try". By the time of the 2010 strike, that experiment was described by BBC Scotland as having been short-lived, and by The Scotsman as having been gradually undermined.

== Penalty incident and aftermath ==
Refereeing in Scotland came under intense media attention in 2010 after a controversial incident on 17 October, during an SPL game between Dundee United and Celtic, which Celtic won 2–1. When the score was level at 1–1, referee Dougie McDonald awarded a penalty kick to Celtic. After consulting with assistant referee Steven Craven, McDonald annulled his initial decision. Celtic officials heavily criticised the decision to not award a penalty after the game. After Craven resigned on 25 October, it emerged that he and McDonald had lied to his supervisor, Jim McBurney, and to Celtic manager Neil Lennon about the decision making process. McDonald had claimed that he had changed his mind after consulting with Craven, when in fact he had changed his mind himself before consulting Craven. This revelation prompted an investigation by the SFA, which resulted in McDonald receiving an official warning on 29 October, while also upholding the actual decision.

Both before and after the warning was given, however, there were calls for McDonald to resign. There was also disagreement over the actual version of events between Craven, McDonald, and SFA Head of Referee Development Hugh Dallas. While resisting calls for an independent inquiry into the McDonald incident, SFA chief executive Stewart Regan launched an inquiry to review how referees are disciplined, suggesting the current method of examination by a panel of mostly former referees was improper. According to The Telegraph recounting the McDonald incident on the eve of the strike, "the rules do not permit McDonald to be sacked", and having declined to resign as the newspaper alleged some at the SFA felt he should, he subsequently returned to the referees roster. On 28 November, the day after Scottish referees went on strike, McDonald retired.

Following the SPL Old Firm game of 24 October, Celtic twice wrote to the SFA to question the decisions made by referee William Collum, who also received death threats. Denying he was stoking up tension around refereeing decisions, Neil Lennon condemned the threats. He also claimed that the media reaction to his club's recent questioning of referees as having been blown out of proportion, and that their actions were not out of the ordinary compared to other clubs. On 3 November Celtic striker Gary Hooper claimed referees wanted to give decisions against his team. Lennon then received a two match touchline ban after heavily criticising decisions by referee Craig Thomson and his team during a 2–0 away defeat to Hearts on 10 November. Lennon stated after the game "I'll seek clarification, but they'll probably have their story ready" and "Craig Thomson's supposed to be one of the best in the country. It doesn't say a lot for the rest if that's the case."

On 30 October, the SFA chief executive Stewart Regan, describing how his first month in the role had been dominated by the issue of refereeing, announced plans to launch a Respect campaign early in 2011. Regan commented that "This whole handling of referees by managers, players and clubs has got to stop". On the same day, Hearts released a statement calling for refereeing standards to go up significantly, post match statements from officials explaining decisions. The statement also suggested that lower standards could be a "cover for bias and match fixing".

On 16 November, Pete Wishart, a spokesman for the Scottish National Party on sport, stated that all referees in Scotland should be required to declare which team they support, claiming that while he did not doubt their fairness, such a declaration was in keeping with the general rise in the freedom of information culture. Two days later, the Celtic chairman John Reid, addressing Celtic's annual general meeting, stated that referee McDonald's position was now completely untenable and called for his resignation. He also stated that Wishart's proposal should be considered as part of the bold and radical action the SFA needed to take to restore their integrity in the wake of the controversy. On 21 November the Sunday Mail published a story claiming that 80 percent of Category One officials had failed a 30-question written exam on the Laws of the Game, conducted at a Spanish winter training camp in February, and alleged Hugh Dallas had been "taken aback" by the results and had instituted remedial action.

== Strike action ==
During a meeting in the afternoon of Sunday, 21 November, the Category One referees voted to strike over the crisis. Media reports suggested all 31 of the 33 Category One referees present at the meeting voted for the strike, supported by all 10 Category Two officials also present. The meeting had followed a regular monthly SFA organised meeting, after which the referees asked to carry on using the room for a meeting of the Scottish Senior Football Referees Association.

Based on the fact that Category Three officials represented by both the SRFA and the Scottish Association of Referees (SAR) had not been represented at the strike meeting, the SSFRA informed them on 23 November that as far as they were concerned, they were at liberty to choose whether or not they accepted appointments for the weekend.

Former Scottish referee Kenny Clark said that the reason for the strike was that referees were at "the end of their tether" over the effect criticism of their decisions was having on themselves, their families, and their professional lives. He cited instances of hate email being sent to the workplaces of referees. Fearing rising tension would lead to attacks, according to Clark, the strike was intended to "put down a marker", and that the comments from Reid had "put the tin lid on it" in the strike meeting. Another former Scottish referee Stuart Dougal said he believed that the SFA had not "been strong enough to come out in defence of referees" since the McDonald incident, and that while referees accepted criticism, "When there is innuendo, and questioning the referee's integrity, that's when it becomes unacceptable". According to The Daily Telegraph, the Sunday Mail story published in the morning the strike meeting was called "was regarded by many at [the strike] meeting as the last straw".

The referees indicated that the strike would proceed as planned, regardless of negotiations during the week, but that they intended to return to officiating afterward. The consequent negotiations, which were described by the referees as constructive, included the offer from the SFA of a ban on all immediate comment from managers on referees before and after games, and stricter sanctions for those who question referees integrity. The referees also sought written assurances from the chairmen of all 42 senior clubs that they respected referees integrity. After a second meeting on Wednesday 24 November, at midnight the referees reaffirmed the strike would be going ahead, as the action was not intended to be a "bargaining chip" to produce "quick fixes or deals". The SFA had set a deadline of Thursday for talks to succeed and the strike to be called off, after which they would be forced to implement contingency plans of seeking foreign, replacement officials.

Referee spokesman John McKendrick described how the strike was intended to affect root and branch change in Scottish football, and act as both a statement of intent and an opportunity for reflection, stating "The time for talking about practical steps to improve Scottish refereeing should start from Monday". He expressed doubt that had the strike not gone ahead, the same "desire for change" which had manifested in the SFA's announcements after the strike was called, would have occurred.

== Reaction ==
According to BBC Scotland, Celtic welcomed the strike, on the basis that it would prompt a UEFA (Union of European Football Associations) investigation into refereeing standards. UEFA however quickly stated they would not be intervening in the dispute, describing it as a "purely domestic matter" for the SFA to resolve.

According to The Daily Telegraph writing after the strike announcement, while "Celtic have remained at the centre of controversy", and excepting the statement from Hearts on 30 October, it stated that "other clubs and managers have refrained from any form of criticism [running up to the decision to strike] in a bid to ease the pressure". Denying that the recent disputes with Celtic were the sole factor behind the decision to strike, on the eve of the strike SFA chief executive Stewart Regan said "This is an issue across Scottish football as far as the refs are concerned. They mentioned incidents and individuals across the SPL and SFL".

Motherwell manager Craig Brown stated the strike was a "radical course of action, a step too far", and complained that the action would unfairly affect his club with loss of broadcast rights revenues if their SPL match at home against Hearts was affected. Kilmarnock manager Mixu Paatelainen described the planned strike as "disappointing" but stated that "there has been too much talk of referees and I don't think that's healthy", claiming it could affect referees performances. The recently appointed manager of Hibernian, Colin Calderwood, was supportive of the strike, but insisted managers had the right to voice their opinions, detailing how there had been concerns in every match he been in charge of up to the strike, and suggested guidelines could be issued to managers on appropriate commentary of referees by managers. While generally supportive and understanding of the referees position, Rangers manager Walter Smith criticised the broad nature of their criticism, and their desire for every club to state they would not question referees integrity. Claiming that his club had never questioned referees integrity, he called on the referees to specifically name the people they believe were questioning their integrity.

As the talks to avert the strike ended, the chief executive of the SPL Neil Doncaster said of the strike that they were "sympathetic towards referees and the criticism they have received in recent weeks, but the way to address concerns is through dialogue, not to walk away from the situation". David Longmuir, chief executive of the SFL, reiterated that they had admiration and support for referees, but that "as a result of the action, many of our clubs and supporters will feel let down". Fraser Wishart, chief executive of the Professional Footballers' Association Scotland, stated he could not 100% support the strike, feeling aggrieved at the fact the discussions between the SFA and the referees in the intervening week between announcement and strike, had been done 'behind closed doors', and would likely "bring in tougher regulations that will see our members being hammered".

It was initially advised on Thursday that 11 of the 20 scheduled games would proceed, including all SPL games, with all but one Scottish Football League match postponed. First Division clubs Cowdenbeath and Stirling Albion, who were among the clubs affected, stated that they would seek compensation from the SFA for the financial effects of rescheduling, citing the example of the cost of having already printed programmes for the games and of staffing commitments.

The SNP Leader and First Minister of Scotland Alex Salmond, Scottish Labour Party Sport spokesperson Bill Butler, and Leader of the Scottish Liberal Democrats Tavish Scott, all expressed their hope that the strike could be avoided through discussion between the referees and the SFA.

Grahame Smith, General Secretary of the Scottish Trades Union Congress supported the strike, describing any referee who officiated as a replacement, as a "scab". The SFA chief executive Stewart Regan denied the replacements were scabs, stating "[the Scottish referees] are not a union. They are an association. They operate for the good of Scottish football, they are not employed by the SFA. They get a match fee. No-one is breaking union rules." Regan stated all replacement officials were all experienced referees at the highest level and had been approved by the SFA's Referee Committee, explaining that they were all either "Fifa listed or Grade One officials in their own countries."

== Replacement officials ==
In order to ensure fixtures would go ahead, the SFA approached "in excess" of 25 nations within UEFA for replacement officials. After being refused help by the associations in Netherlands, Iceland and Norway, and also having believed to have been declined help by those in Belgium, Estonia, Northern Ireland, the Republic of Ireland, Sweden and Wales, by 25 November, the SFA stated it had secured officials for 11 of the 20 fixtures originally scheduled for the affected weekend. The 44 officials being drafted in to allow the 11 games to go ahead were believed to be from Malta, Israel, Poland, Portugal and Luxembourg, at a cost of around £40,000. According to The Daily Telegraph, the English Premier League had insufficient numbers of free officials to be able to help.

The 11 fixtures that were to go ahead as scheduled using replacement officials, comprised the full Scottish Premier League programme (4 games on Saturday, 2 on Sunday), three Saturday Scottish Cup third round replays, the Sunday 2010 Scottish Challenge Cup Final, and one First Division game (drawn by lots). The nine games which would not go ahead were the remaining First Division fixtures (3 games), and all the games in the Second Division (2 games), and Third Division (4 games), all scheduled for the Saturday.

In light of the free choice stance of the SRFA at the strike meeting on the involvement of Category Three Scottish referees, three of them were lined up to act as the fourth officials in three SPL games alongside the foreign officials.

On 26 November, the Polish FA reversed their decision to send three sets of officials, stating they were now required for games in Poland, followed by the Portuguese FA, who had sent teams of officials to cover the two Sunday SPL games, only to board a return flight as soon as they arrived at Glasgow Airport. The withdrawals led to the last remaining Division One game being called off, and two of three Scottish Cup replays also being called off, and cast doubt over cover for the remaining fixtures. Scottish broadcaster STV claimed the Polish referees withdrew upon learning they were covering for striking referees, rather than participating in an exchange programme. On the eve of the strike, the Israeli FA stated it might not have sent referees had it been given the full story behind the request by the SFA, while the Luxembourg FA stated they had not been given the reasons behind the SFA's request, but that they had been following the dispute on the internet.

The SFA published the names of the referees appointed for the weekend fixtures on Friday 26 November, showing that the matches would be refereed by officials from Malta, Israel, Portugal and Luxembourg. These appointments were thrown into confusion, however, when the Portuguese officials returned home soon after arriving at Glasgow Airport. The Portuguese referees had been due to officiate the matches at Hibernian on Saturday and Motherwell on Sunday.

Adverse weather conditions also affected the scheduled matches. Two of the Scottish Cup replays failed a Friday pitch inspection after the time of the Polish withdrawal, with the last one called off on Saturday morning due to overnight snow. The latter postponement opened a possibility for the SFA to plug the gap caused by the departure of the Portuguese officials. The Maltese officials were reassigned to cover the match between Hibernian and St Johnstone. A set of Israeli officials were given the scheduled match between Motherwell and Hearts, which was postponed on Sunday morning due to deteriorating weather conditions. The SFL also postponed the 2010 Scottish Challenge Cup Final due to those conditions. Alain Hamer had been due to referee the match between Dundee United and Rangers on Sunday, having controlled the match between Celtic and Inverness on Saturday, but the game was called off after a Sunday morning pitch inspection.

One of the Israeli officials, Eli Hacmon, commented after refereeing the match between Kilmarnock and Aberdeen that no-one had explained to him why the referees were on strike before he travelled to Scotland. He went on to say that he would not have provided his services if he had known that the Scottish referees had gone on strike due to criticism. Aberdeen players protested when Hacmon awarded a penalty kick against them during the match, but BBC Sport commented that it appeared to be a simple decision, as goalkeeper Jamie Langfield had impeded Alexei Eremenko.

With both Sunday SPL games postponed due to the weather, only four of the scheduled 20 games in the weekend programme went ahead. The four results were Celtic 2–2 Inverness, Hamilton 0–0 St Mirren, Hibernian 0–0 St Johnstone and Kilmarnock 2–0 Aberdeen, with officials from Malta, Luxembourg and Israel in control, as well as two Scottish fourth officials. According to the Scotland On Sunday, the games controlled by the replacement officials was the first instance of a referee from outside Scotland refereeing a Scottish domestic match since 1905, when an English referee had been invited to officiate a league championship deciding match between the Old Firm rivals of Celtic and Rangers.

== Aftermath ==
SFA chief executive Stewart Regan stated his confidence on 28 November that the referees would return to work the following weekend, as he believed that the intention of the referees was to only withdraw service for one weekend of matches. Regan also denied that the foreign officials had been misled by the SFA as to why they had been recruited. The Daily Record newspaper obtained a copy of the letter sent by the SFA to foreign associations requesting assistance, but found inconsistencies between the letter and what foreign officials believed to be the case.

Referee Dougie McDonald announced his early retirement following the strike weekend amidst ongoing debate about refereeing standards. A statement from the referees after the strike said, "Dougie retiring caps a sad time for Scottish refereeing. We hope the right people can sit down with referees and play a full part in delivering the real changes required." adding that they hoped the strike had "allowed everyone connected with Scottish football to have the period of reflection we felt was needed". Although Celtic made no official comment, Paul McBride, a QC closely linked to the Celtic board of directors, commented that the club felt vindicated by the departures of Dallas and McDonald.

Stirling Albion director Paul Goodwin stated on 30 November that he expected the SFL to pursue the SFA for compensation on behalf of the SFL clubs that had matches postponed due to the strike. Goodwin estimated that his club had lost around £10,000 due to the postponement of their match against Partick Thistle.

In April 2011, Kenny Clark expressed his fear that another strike may take place due to the referees' belief that the SFA do not support them sufficiently. His comments were made the day after the SFA fined Rangers defender Madjid Bougherra for manhandling referee Calum Murray during an Old Firm Scottish Cup tie, instead of potentially suspending the player from matches. During the 2013–14 season, Dundee United striker Nadir Çiftçi was suspended for two matches after he was found guilty of "placing an open hand on the ... throat" of referee Gavin Harris. The referees' association criticised the sentence for being too lenient, leading to media speculation that the referees would take industrial action.

Speaking in October 2018, Kenny Clark said that the strike had not brought about an improvement in respect for referees. Clark was commenting in the days after a Livingston v Rangers game, where someone in a section of Rangers supporters hit an assistant referee with a coin.

== See also ==
- List of strikes
- List of Scottish football referees
- Strike action in association football
