= Robert Allan (trade unionist) =

Scottish trade unionist

Robert Allan was a Scottish trade unionist who served as leader of the Scottish Trades Union Congress (STUC).

Allan worked as a compositor in Edinburgh, and joined the Social Democratic Federation. He was active in the Scottish Typographical Association (STA) and the Edinburgh Trades Council. He attended the STUC from its foundation, always taking a prominent part in debates.

Allan was first elected to the General Council of the STUC in 1899, and on the council he championed the creation of a Scottish Labour Representation Committee, to stand Parliamentary candidates on behalf of the socialist, trade union and co-operative movements. This was formed as the Scottish Workers' Representation Committee, and Allan became its first secretary, although in 1902 he was replaced by leader of the STUC, George Carson.

In 1913, Allan stood to become general secretary of the STA, but he took third place with only 581 votes, behind Charles Jackson and the winner, James Brown. He was re-elected to the Parliamentary Committee of the STUC in 1912, and in this role gave some support to the Red Clydeside movement, arguing that its actions were "hasty and unwise", but that the committee should not ignore it, but instead try to give it guidance.

By 1917, Carson was seventy years old and looking to reduce his involvement in the STUC. Allan had developed a strong working relationship with Carson, and was also the STUC President that year. He was seen as the natural choice to become his assistant secretary. The following year, he succeeded Carson as Secretary of the Parliamentary Committee of the STUC, its leading figure. Allan believed that the organisation was ineffective, and gave too much power to small unions. At the 1919 Congress, he proposed adopting a block vote system similar to that used by the Trades Union Congress, but this was opposed by a majority of unions.

Carson persuaded the Parliamentary Committee to found a Labour Institute in Glasgow, as a fitting base for the STUC. He purchased a site, with the STUC meeting monthly repayments, but it was only in 1922 that affiliated unions became aware of the deal. With union memberships falling as unemployment rose, the deal became unaffordable, and Allan was suspended. A couple of days later, he was seriously injured at Carlisle railway station and lost both his legs. In sympathy, he was allowed to stand down on good terms, but never again played a leading role in the trade union movement.

Trade union offices
Preceded by New position	Secretary of the Scottish Workers' Representation Committee; 1900–1902	Succeeded by George Carson
Preceded by David Gilmour	President of the Scottish Trades Union Congress; 1917	Succeeded by Hugh Lyon
Preceded by George Carson	Secretary of the Parliamentary Committee of the Scottish Trades Union Congress; 1918–1922	Succeeded by William Elger
