= Robert Taylor (trade unionist) =

Scottish trade union leader

Robert Taylor (30 October 1900 – 1986) was a Scottish trade union leader.

Taylor was born in West Benhar, near Bathgate in Lanarkshire, and was one of twenty-two children. He became a miner in an oil and shale mine and began taking qualifications to become a manager. When he was seventeen, he joined the Independent Labour Party, and became chair of the local branch three years later.

Taylor married in 1921 but, on return from honeymoon, his wages were halved. He decided to re-train as a driver, and became a van driver for the Bathgate Co-operative Society. In 1923, he stood unsuccessfully for Bathgate Council.

Taylor became active in the Scottish Horse and Motormen's Association (SHMA), and in 1925 became a full-time organiser for the union. He also performed much of the role of the union's chief clerk, and was minutes secretary to the Glasgow branch. He was also elected to the executive of the Glasgow Trades Council, becoming vice-president to Thomas Scollan. Scollan rarely attended trades council meetings, so Taylor played a key role in the organisation.

In April 1936, general secretary of the SHMA Hugh Lyon was dismissed. Taylor stood in the ensuing election, defeating interim general secretary Peter Webster by 3645 votes to 2256 in November, and became leader of the union. He pledged to engage with the Joint Industrial Council negotiating frameworks, and to consider amalgamation with other unions. From 1935, he served on the executive of the Scottish Trades Union Congress (STUC), and he was President of the STUC in 1938/39.

Taylor announced his resignation as leader of the SHMA in September 1943, to become president of the Scottish Co-operative Wholesale Society offering three months’ notice. Although James White Jr of the Glasgow branch argued that he could not fulfil both roles, and should be asked to leave immediately, he was instead asked to remain until the end of the year, once a successor had been appointed.

As President of the SCWS, Taylor fell into disputes with his former union. He retired in 1965, due to poor health.

Trade union offices
| Preceded by Hugh Lyon | General Secretary of the Scottish Horse and Motormen's Association; 1936–1943 | Succeeded by John Brannigan |
| Preceded by Herbert Ellison | President of the Scottish Trades Union Congress; 1938–1939 | Succeeded by William Quin |
