= William Elger =

William Elger (1891 – 6 November 1946) was a Scottish trade union leader.

Born in London, Elger's father was Austrian, and his mother was Scottish. He relocated to Edinburgh and became a clerical worker. He became active with the Edinburgh Trades Council, serving as its president in 1921/22. In 1922, he was elected as General Secretary of the Scottish Trades Union Congress (STUC). His focus was on increasing membership of the STUC, encouraging Scottish unions to merge into their UK-wide counterparts in order that the larger body would then affiliate. Although this approach was unpopular with Scottish trades councils, which saw their influence reduced, it proved successful, with membership growing by more than a third during his secretaryship.

Elger was also elected to Glasgow City Council, representing the Labour Party in Ruchill. From 1940 to 1946, he additionally served as president of the Clerical and Administrative Workers' Union. He died in office in 1946.

Trade union offices
Preceded by Robert Allan	General Secretary of the Scottish Trades Union Congress; 1922–1946	Succeeded by Charles Murdoch
Preceded by Hubert Hughes	President of the Clerical and Administrative Workers' Union; 1940–1946	Succeeded by Bob Scouller
