= Charles Murdoch =

Charles Murdoch may refer to:

- Charles Murdoch (footballer), Scottish footballer
- Charles Murdoch (trade unionist) (1902–1962), Scottish trade union leader
- Charles Murdoch (record producer), Australian record producer and musician
- Charles Townshend Murdoch (1837–1898), English banker and politician
