= Archibald MacKellar =

Scottish trade unionist

Archibald Duncan MacKellar (18 October 1890 – ) was a Scottish trade unionist, who served as president of the Scottish Trades Union Congress (STUC).

MacKellar was born in Govan and worked as a draughtsman at John Brown's shipyard in Glasgow. In 1913, he was a founding members of the Glasgow branch of the Association of Engineering and Shipbuilding Draughtsmen (AESD). He rapidly became one of the union's leading figures, in 1918 chairing its committee on the Whitley Reports. He served on the union's executive committee for many years, and was president of the union for 1929-1930.

In 1938, MacKellar was appointed as the AESD's full-time organiser for the London area, then later moved to cover Scotland and Northern Ireland. In this new role, he became prominent in the Scottish Trades Union Congress, serving on its general council from 1947, as its fraternal delegate to the Irish Trades Union Congress in 1951, and as its chair for 1952-1953.

In the 1953 New Year Honours, MacKellar was made an Officer of the Order of the British Empire. He retired in 1955.

Trade union offices
| Preceded by John Brannigan | President of the Scottish Trades Union Congress; 1952–1953 | Succeeded by John Bothwell |
