= Scottish Socialist Party (disambiguation) =

Scottish Socialist Party is an organization formed in 1998 from the Scottish Socialist Alliance.

Scottish Socialist Party may also refer to:

- Scottish Socialist Party (1942), led by William Oliver Brown
- Scottish Socialist Party (1932), split from the Independent Labour Party, led by Patrick Dollan
- Scottish Labour Party (1888), formed by Robert Bontine Cunninghame Graham

== See also ==
- Socialist Party Scotland, Scottish section of the Committee for a Workers' International
