= 1885 Aberdeen Corporation election =

Election

← 1884	November 3, 1885	1886 →

10 out of 25 seats of City of Aberdeen Council 13 seats needed for a majority
	First party	Second party
Party	Independent	Trades Council
Seats won	8	2
Seats after	21	4
Seat change	2 ▼	2 ▲
Popular vote	1,431	1,487
Percentage	49.0%	51.0%
- Composition of Corporation after the election

An election to the Aberdeen Corporation was held on 3 November 1885, alongside municipal elections across Scotland. 10 of the corporation's 25 seats were up for election.

This election marked a conversion of sitting councillors to a labour programme. John Morgan of Greyfriars, who was elected temporarily after a councillor resigned, stood affiliated with the Aberdeen United Trades Council. The same situation occurred with Alexander Lyon Jr. of St. Nicholas, who had lost to a Trades Council candidate at the previous election. All three seats in Greyfriars ward were up for election as two councillors resigned and one was disqualified from holding office.

== Ward Results ==
Ferryhill
Party	Candidate	Votes	%
Independent	William Henderson	Unopposed	
Majority			
Turnout			
Independent hold			

Greyfriars 3 Seats
Party	Candidate	Votes	%
Independent	David Byres (incumbent)	361	26.2
Trades Council	John Morgan (incumbent)	304	22.1
Independent	J. S. Anderson	257	18.7
Trades Council	D. C. Macdonald	238	17.3
Independent	W. S. Adamson	218	15.8
Majority			
Turnout			40.1
Independent hold			
Trades Council gain from Independent			
Independent hold			

Rosemount
Party	Candidate	Votes	%
Independent	Charles Gordon	Unopposed	
Majority			
Turnout			
Independent hold			

Rubislaw
Party	Candidate	Votes	%
Independent	John Gray	Unopposed	
Majority			
Turnout			
Independent hold			

St. Andrews
Party	Candidate	Votes	%
Independent	William Findlay	Unopposed	
Majority			
Turnout			
Independent hold			

St. Clement
Party	Candidate	Votes	%
Independent	William Pyper (incumbent)	387	51.3
Trades Council	J. C. Thompson	367	48.7
Majority		20	
Turnout			41.8
Independent hold			

St. Machar
Party	Candidate	Votes	%
Independent	William Collie	Unopposed	
Majority			
Turnout			
Independent hold			

St. Nicholas
Party	Candidate	Votes	%
Trades Council	Alexander Lyon Jr. (incumbent)	578	73.5
Independent	George Ogilvie	208	26.5
Majority		370	
Turnout			28.7
Trades Council gain from Independent			
