= Norman Hogg =

Norman Hogg may refer to:

- Norman Hogg, Baron Hogg of Cumbernauld (1938–2008), Scottish Labour Party politician.
- Norman Hogg (politician, born 1907) (1907–1975), his father, Scottish Labour Party politician
