= 1884 Aberdeen Corporation election =

Election

← 1883	November 4, 1884	1885 →

8 out of 25 seats of City of Aberdeen Council 13 seats needed for a majority
	First party	Second party
Party	Independent	Trades Council
Seats won	6	2
Seats after	23	2
Seat change	2 ▼	2 ▲
Popular vote	5,018	1,101
Percentage	82.0%	18.0%
- Composition of Corporation after the election

An election to the Aberdeen Corporation was held on 4 November 1884, alongside municipal elections across Scotland. 8 of the corporation's 25 seats were up for election.

This election was the first time labour-affiliated candidates won seats in Aberdeen's municipal elections. The candidates, James Forbes and George Maconnachie, were supported by the Aberdeen United Trades Council. The primary question at hand was the rates of councillors' salaries, and public feelings on the matter were clear as all retiring councillors but one were not re-elected.

== Ward Results ==
Ferryhill
Party	Candidate	Votes	%
Independent	James Berry	731	69.7
Independent	Henry Gray (incumbent)	318	30.3
Majority		395	
Turnout			
Independent hold			

Greyfriars
Party	Candidate	Votes	%
Independent	James Wallace Thom	629	56.2
Independent	Baillie Macdonald (incumbent)	491	43.8
Majority		138	
Turnout			
Independent hold			

Rosemount
Party	Candidate	Votes	%
Independent	John Ogilvie (incumbent)	Unopposed	
Majority			
Turnout			
Independent hold			

Rubislaw
Party	Candidate	Votes	%
Independent	James Sutherland	471	57.9
Independent	Archibald Duff (incumbent)	342	42.1
Majority		129	
Turnout			
Independent hold			

St. Andrew
Party	Candidate	Votes	%
Trades Council	George Maconnachie	505	41.7
Independent	William Findlay	486	40.1
Independent	A. S. Cook (incumbent)	219	18.1
Independent	Charles Dickie	2	0.1
Majority		19	
Turnout			
Trades Council gain from Independent			

St. Clement
Party	Candidate	Votes	%
Independent	Alexander Cook Jr.	615	70.0
Independent	Dr. Beveridge (incumbent)	263	30.0
Majority		352	
Turnout			
Independent hold			

St. Machar
Party	Candidate	Votes	%
Trades Council	James Forbes	596	56.9
Independent	Alexander Lyon Jr.	451	43.1
Majority		145	
Turnout			
Trades Council gain from Independent			

St. Nicholas
Party	Candidate	Votes	%
Independent	Thomas Curr	Unopposed	
Majority			
Turnout			
Independent hold			
