= Alec Kitson =

British trade unionist and Labour Party official

Alexander Harper Kitson (21 October 1921 – 2 August 1997) was a British trade unionist and Labour Party official.

Kitson grew up in Kirknewton, from where he undertook milk deliveries to Morningside alongside Sean Connery. He studied at Kirknewton School before becoming a lorry driver. He became an active trade unionist, and a full-time union official from 1945. In 1959, he was elected as General Secretary of the Scottish Commercial Motormen's Union, serving until 1971, when he took the union into a merger with the Transport and General Workers' Union (TGWU)

Kitson chaired the Scottish Trades Union Congress (STUC) in 1966, and was its treasurer from 1974 until 1981. He was also long-term member of the National Executive Committee of the Labour Party, serving from 1968 until 1986, and was the Chair of the Labour Party in 1980–81. He unsuccessfully contested the General Secretaryship of the TGWU in 1977, serving instead its Deputy General Secretary from 1980 until his retirement in 1986.

Kitson was known as an admirer of the Soviet Union, a position largely influenced by Abe Moffat. He served on the World Peace Council as a supporter of James Lamond, and visited the USSR annually from the 1950s until the 1980s.

In his spare time, Kitson served on the national council of War on Want, on Corstorphine Community Council, and briefly as chairman of Heart of Midlothian FC. In retirement from his union posts, he also served as chairman of the Board of Lothian Buses.

Trade union offices
Preceded by John Brannigan	General Secretary of the Scottish Commercial Motormen's Union; 1959–1971	Succeeded by Position abolished
Preceded by William Scholes	President of the Scottish Trades Union Congress; 1966–1967	Succeeded by Bill McLean
Preceded by Harry Urwin	Deputy General Secretary of the Transport and General Workers' Union; 1980–1986	Succeeded by Bill Morris
Party political offices
Preceded by Lena Jeger	Chair of the Labour Party; 1980–1981	Succeeded by Judith Hart
