= Scottish Union of Bakers and Allied Workers =

Former Scottish trade union

- Merged into: Union of Shop, Distributive and Allied Workers
- Founded: 1888
- Dissolved: 1978
- Headquarters: 5 Burnbank Gardens, Glasgow
- Location: Scotland
- Members: 11,713 (1971)
- Publication: The Scottish Baker
- Affiliations: STUC, TUC, IUF, Labour Party

The Scottish Union of Bakers and Allied Workers was a trade union representing bakers and confectioners in Scotland.

The union was founded in 1888, when it was known as the Operative Bakers' National Federal Union of Scotland. By the following year, it had more than 3,000 members, but a decision to undertake a national strike led many new members to resign. Membership fell below 2,000 before gradually increasing, rising above 5,000 by 1910, and to around 7,500 by 1923.

During World War I, the union changed its name to the Operative Bakers and Confectioners of Scotland National Federal Union, then to the Scottish Union of Bakers and Confectioners in 1923, and to the Scottish Union of Bakers, Confectioners and Bakery Workers in 1927. From 1926, the union accepted women as members and sought to become an industrial union, including unskilled workers in the industry.

In 1949, the union again changed its name, to the lengthy Scottish Union of Bakers, Confectioners, Biscuit Bakers and Bakery Workers, shortening this in 1955 to the "Scottish Union of Bakers and Allied Workers".

Membership of the union peaked in 1971 at 11,713 but fell below 9,000 as the decade progressed. As a result, it decided to merge into the Union of Shop, Distributive and Allied Workers in 1978.

== Strikes organized ==
- 1889 Scottish bakers’ strike.
- Dumfries bakers' strike of 1905.

== Election results ==
The union sponsored Norman Hogg, its national organiser, as a Labour Party candidate in a Parliamentary election.

Election	Constituency	Candidate	Votes	Percentage	Position
1950 general election	South Angus	Norman Hogg	9,176	25.6	2

== General Secretaries ==
1900s: J. Kerr
1910s: W. G. Hunter
1929: George Laidlaw
1942: Charles Murdoch
1947: John Menzies
1950: William Mowbray
c.1970: Alex Mackie
