= Roz Foyer =

Scottish trade unionist (born 1972)

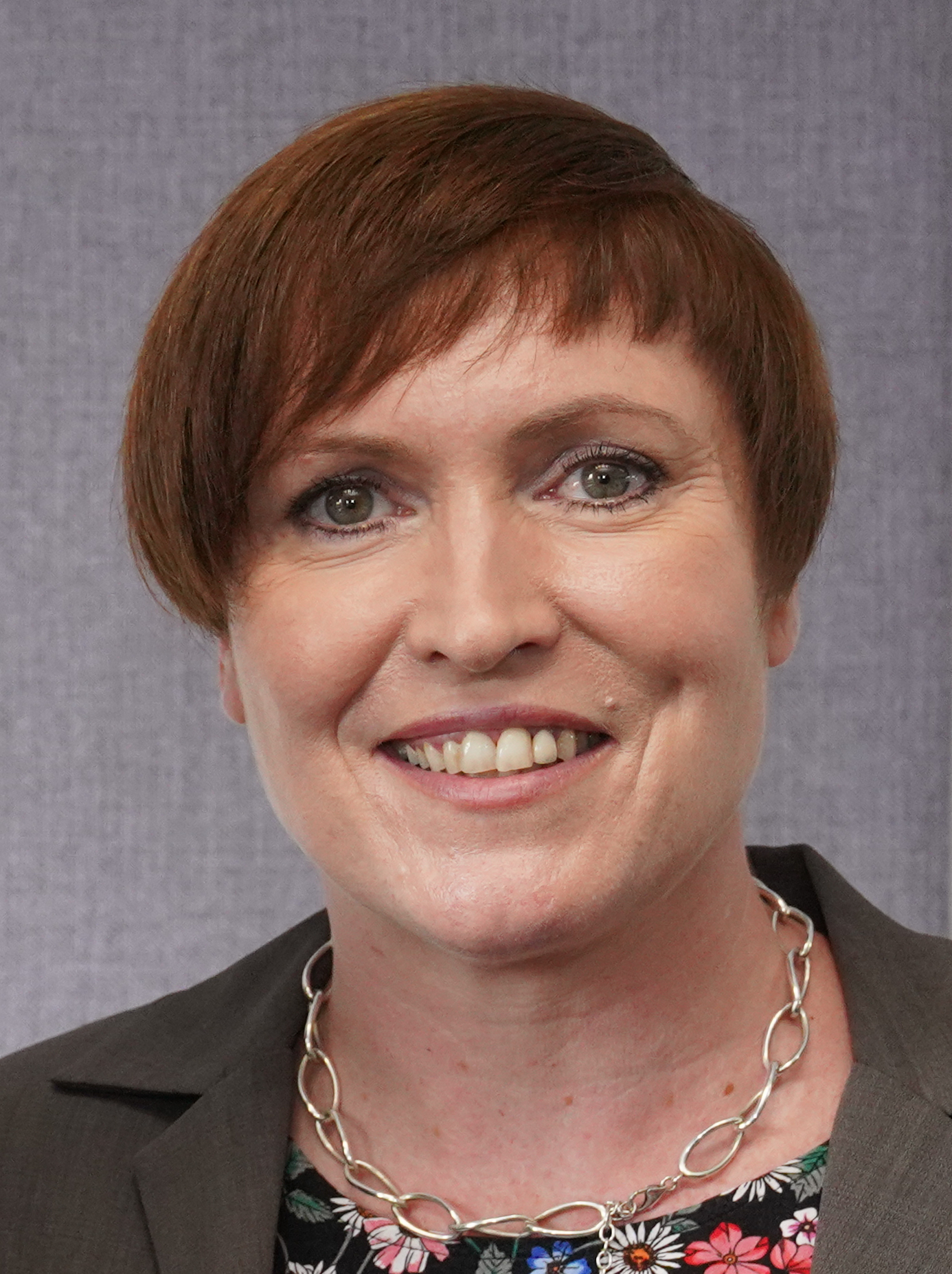
- Foyer in 2024

General Secretary of the Scottish Trades Union Congress
- Incumbent
- Assumed office 3 February 2020
- Preceded by: Grahame Smith

Personal details
- Born: Rozanne Foyer; November 1972 (age 53) Glasgow, Scotland
- Spouse: Simon Macfarlane (m. 2002)
- Children: 2

Rozanne Foyer (born November 1972) is a Scottish trade unionist who has served as the General Secretary of the Scottish Trades Union Congress (STUC) since 2020; the first woman to hold the post.

== Early life ==
Foyer grew up in Glasgow as an only child, where she helped out on her parents' market stall in the Barras. She left school after her Highers, and worked in the VAT office, but left after being sexually harassed and unsure of her rights, an experience which inspired her to join a union.

== Career ==
Foyer worked for the Benefits Agency, where she led a successful campaign against privatisation. This led the Graphical, Paper and Media Union to take her on full-time as a trainee organiser, following which she became an assistant secretary at the Scottish Trades Union Congress (STUC). Her next appointment was as a national officer for the Transport and General Workers' Union, and after it became part of Unite, she worked in its national organising department.

Foyer served on the general council of the STUC for many years, served a term as chair of the STUC's youth committee. In 2020, she was appointed as General Secretary of the STUC, the first woman to hold the post.

In March 2023, it was announced that Foyer would be joining Scottish newspaper The National as a regular columnist.

== Personal life ==
Foyer has been married to Simon Macfarlane, also a trade unionist, since 2002. They have two daughters. She lives in Glasgow, and also has homes on the Isle of Jura and in Spain amongst others.

Trade union offices
Preceded by Grahame Smith	General Secretary of the Scottish Trades Union Congress; 2020–present	Incumbent
