= William Shaw (Glasgow politician) =

Scottish trade unionist and politician

William Shaw (died 15 May 1937) was a Scottish trade unionist and politician.

Born in Stranraer, Shaw worked as a joiner and became involved with the Amalgamated Society of Carpenters and Joiners early in life. In 1916, he was elected unopposed as the secretary of Glasgow Trades Council, at the time also the Labour Party organisation for the city. At the time, he was active in the Independent Labour Party and was an opponent of World War I. This enabled him to have a reasonable working relationship with the Clyde Workers' Committee, and he wrote to the British Socialist Party asking them to support the committee's strike.

In 1920, Shaw served as chairman of the Scottish Trades Union Congress and, when the British Trades Union Congress held its annual conference in Glasgow, he served as its minutes secretary.

Shaw stood as a Labour Party candidate for Glasgow City Council on numerous occasions, winning Maryhill ward in 1920, Whitevale in 1925, and Springburn in 1929, 1932 and 1935. He had left the ILP by the time of its split from the Labour Party, and beat an ILP candidate in the 1932 election. He also served as a magistrate in the city.

Shortly before his death, Shaw led protests to the Scottish Football Association about the Germany national football team being invited to play in Glasgow.

Trade union offices
Preceded by George Carson	Secretary of the Glasgow Trades and Labour Council; 1916 – 1937	Succeeded by Arthur Brady
Preceded by Neil Beaton	President of the Scottish Trades Union Congress; 1920	Succeeded by James Walker
