= John Brannigan =

Scottish trade union leader (1900–1959)

John Brannigan MBE (5 January 1900 – 18 July 1959) was a Scottish trade union leader.

Brannigan was born in Cambusnethan, Lanarkshire, to Patrick Brannigan, a steel dresser and journeyman, and his wife, Helen (née Lynch). He found work driving a horse-drawn van for the Lanarkshire Co-operative Society. He became active in the Scottish Horse and Motormen's Association, and began working full-time for the union in 1920.

Brannigan was elected as assistant general secretary of the union in 1938. In December 1943, he was elected as the union's general secretary, defeating David Johnstone, Alexander Irvine and James White Jr, winning more than 50% of the votes. While considered a good speaker and negotiator, he showed little interest in innovations, and the union stagnated under his leadership.

In late 1949, Brannigan was involved in a serious motor accident while drunk. He collapsed while at the police station and was kept in hospital for four weeks. Some members of the union, including assistant general secretary David Johnstone, sought to have Branningan removed as general secretary, but Brannigan eventually won out, and Johnstone was instead suspended.

Brannigan received support from other unions during this period, and served as President of the Scottish Trades Union Congress in 1952/53. However, he lost his seat on the STUC executive immediately afterwards, and was never re-elected, leaving the union as the only substantial Scottish trade union not represented on the body.

By 1956, Brannigan was concerned about the union's finances. The union's executive appointed Alex Kitson appointed as a new organiser, over Brannigan's objections. He also opposed Kitson’s appointment as assistant general secretary later in the year, with a mandate to run union affairs when he was unavailable. Eventually, in 1959, he relented to the appointment of Kitson as an assistant general secretary. He died suddenly on 18 July 1959.

In the 1950 Birthday Honours, Brannigan was made a Member of the Order of the British Empire. In his spare time, he served on the Scottish Transport Users' Consultative Committee, the Cinematograph Exhibitors' Association, and the Local Price Regulation Committee.

Trade union offices
Preceded by New position?	Assistant General Secretary of the Scottish Horse and Motormen's Association; 1938–1944	Succeeded by David Johnstone
Preceded by Robert Taylor	General Secretary of the Scottish Horse and Motormen's Association; 1944–1959	Succeeded by Alex Kitson
Preceded by John Lang	President of the Scottish Trades Union Congress; 1952–1953	Succeeded by Archibald MacKellar
