= British and Irish Orthoptic Society =

Professional body representing orthoptists in UK and Ireland

- British and Irish Orthoptic Society
- Formation: 1937; 89 years ago
- Location: United Kingdom
- Members: ▲1,511 (2024)
- Chair: Craig Murray
- General Secretary: Sam Aitkenhead
- Affiliations: STUC
- Website: orthoptics.org.uk

The British and Irish Orthoptic Society (BIOS) is a professional body representing orthoptists in the United Kingdom and Ireland.

The society was established in 1937 as the British Orthoptic Society. By 2002, it had 1,455 members, the large majority of whom were women.

Orthopists in the UK and Ireland are trained at either Glasgow Caledonian University, the University of Liverpool, or the University of Sheffield. Most work for the National Health Service, with a few working for private healthcare organisations, or in Ireland.

The society is a member of the Allied Health Professionals Federation and the International Orthoptic Association. It operates a trade union wing, the British Orthoptic Society Trade Union, which is affiliated to the Trades Union Congress.
