= William Paterson (trade unionist) =

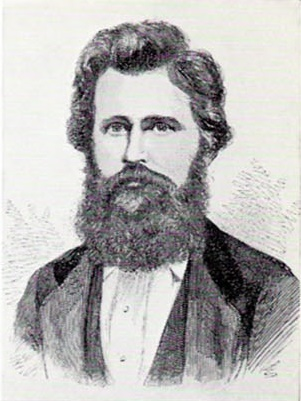
Paterson, while general secretary of the AC&JS

William Paterson (3 January 1843 – 17 December 1906) was a Scottish trade unionist and fire officer.

Born in Elgin, Paterson followed his father in becoming a joiner. He completed an apprenticeship, and then moved to Edinburgh to find work. He joined the Associated Carpenters and Joiners of Scotland union, and was soon elected as branch secretary.

In 1867, Paterson was elected as general secretary of the union. He adopted a militant approach, and this led to increased wages and reduced hours for members of the union. As a result, the union's membership increased, and it survived a recession in the late 1870s.

Paterson was active in the campaign for universal male enfranchisement; he was the main organiser of a demonstration in Edinburgh in 1866, and was secretary of the city's branch of the Reform League for the following year. He stood for Edinburgh Town Council's Canongate ward in 1870, as a Liberal-Labour candidate, coming only fifty votes behind his opponent. He moved to Glasgow in 1875, when the headquarters of the union were transferred there. From 1881 to 1883, he also served on the Parliamentary Committee of the Trades Union Congress.

In 1883, Paterson stood down as leader of the union to become the first working-class factory inspector in Scotland. However, he had long held an interest in fire safety and, at the end of 1884, he instead became superintendent of the Glasgow Fire Brigade. The brigade expanded significantly under his leadership, with six new fire stations, about ninety additional staff, and much new equipment. The Glasgow Herald state that: "Among the men under his charge he was very popular. He was a strict disciplinarian, insisted on sedulous attention to duty, but he did everything in his power to provide for the comfort of the staff, nor did he neglect to consider the necessity for facilities for healthful exercise, relaxation and amusement in the laying out of the stations which he had erected". In 1903, he was a founder of the Association of Professional Fire Brigade Officers of the British Empire, and he served as its president for the first two years.

Paterson's health declined during 1906, but he appeared to recover following an operation in July. In December, he attended a fire in person, but he caught a cold and died less than two weeks later.

Trade union offices
Preceded by William Matson	General Secretary of the Associated Carpenters and Joiners of Scotland; 1867–1883	Succeeded by James Beveridge
