= Arthur Brady (politician) =

Arthur Walker Brady (died 19 February 1954) was a Scottish politician.

Brady first came to prominence as a member of the Independent Labour Party (ILP) in Irvine. He was elected to Irvine Town Council, and also to Ayrshire County Council, on which he was selected as chairman of the Labour Party group. He was elected as the treasurer of the Scottish Council of the ILP, but in 1931 was part of the group which disagreed with the ILP's policy of disaffiliating from the Labour Party.

With Patrick Dollan and a number of ILP Members of Parliament, Brady founded the Scottish Socialist Party (SSP), which sought to continue ILP policies while re-affiliating to the Labour Party. Brady was elected as the group's general secretary, and successfully affiliated the group to Labour. He represented it on the Scottish Council of Labour until it dissolved in 1940, and afterwards served for a while as Chairman of the Scottish Labour Party.

At the 1935 general election, Brady represented the Labour Party in Ayr Burghs. He took 13,274 votes, but did not come close to election.

In order to administer the SSP, Brady had moved to Glasgow, and became involved in the city's politics. In 1937, he was elected as Secretary of Glasgow Trades and Labour Council, the body at the time serving to represent both the local Labour Party and the city's trade union movement. In 1942, Labour decided to split the two posts, and Brady chose to become the secretary of the Glasgow Burgh Labour Party, resigning from the trades council role.

Trade union offices
Preceded by William Shaw	Secretary of the Glasgow Trades and Labour Council; 1937 – 1942	Succeeded by George Middleton
