= John Battersby =

Scottish trade unionist and politician (1839–1922)

John Battersby (1839–1922) was a Scottish trade unionist and politician.

== Life and career ==
Born in Glasgow, Battersby completed an apprenticeship as a compositor with the Glasgow Courier newspaper. He joined the Scottish Typographical Association, and in 1874 he was elected as its secretary, serving until 1887, during which time he led a major reorganisation of the society. He became known for his integrity, and was nicknamed "Honest John".

As leader of the association, Battersby represented it to the Trades Union Congress (TUC). When the TUC was held in Glasgow, in 1875, he was elected as its president. In his address to the conference, he argued that the TUC should assist in obtaining a Factory Act regulating conditions of work in India. Following the conference, he served two terms on the Parliamentary Committee of the TUC.

Battersby was also active on the Glasgow Trades Council, and when its president, Andrew Boa, emigrated to Australia, he won the post. He joined the Scottish Land Restoration League in 1884, and was successful in proposing that the trades council should campaign for land reform, but did not convince it to affiliate to the league.

Battersby was also active in the Liberal-Labour movement. In 1890, with the backing of the trades council, he was elected to Glasgow Town Council in Hutchesontown. He remained a supporter of the labour movement; in 1902, when he was chair of the council's Cleansing Committee, workers went on strike, and Battersby supported them. For much of this time, the council was officially non-party political, but Battersby was long identified with the Liberal Party. However, in 1908, he was expelled from his local liberal association for having "socialist leanings".

Battersby remained on the council for more than thirty years, and by his retirement in 1919 was its longest-serving councillor. On his retirement, he was presented with a bronze bust of himself, which he donate to the Glasgow Art Gallery. He died three years later, at the age of 82.

Trade union offices
Preceded by Simon Martin	General Secretary of the Scottish Typographical Association; 1874–1887	Succeeded by William Johnstone
Preceded by James Fitzpatrick	President of the Trades Union Congress; 1875	Succeeded by James C. Laird
