= Charles Murdoch (trade unionist) =

Scottish trade union leader

Charles Murdoch (13 August 1902 – 2 May 1962) was a Scottish trade union leader.

Born in Glasgow, Murdoch completed an apprenticeship as a baker and became active in the Scottish Union of Bakers. In 1926, he was appointed as the union's Glasgow organiser, then later as its national organiser, and in 1942 as its general secretary.

In 1936, Murdoch was elected to the council of the Scottish Trades Union Congress (STUC), and in 1941/42, he served as its chairman. In 1946, he was elected to Glasgow City Council for the Labour Party, and William Elger, secretary of the STUC died. Murdoch was elected as his replacement, beating George Middleton and David Currie. However, he resigned in 1948 to take a full-time job as a member of the Scottish Gas Board, later becoming its personnel manager, a role in which he served until his death in 1962.

Trade union offices
Preceded by J. Watson	President of the Scottish Trades Union Congress; 1941 – 1942	Succeeded by Peter Henderson
Preceded by George Laidlaw	General Secretary of the Scottish Union of Bakers; 1942–1947	Succeeded by John Menzies
Preceded by William Elger	General Secretary of the Scottish Trades Union Congress; 1947 – 1948	Succeeded by George Middleton
