= Neil Beaton =

- Born: Neil Scobie Beaton; 18 August 1880; Buickloch, Assynt, Scotland
- Died: 23 October 1960 (aged 80); Portobello, Edinburgh, Scotland
- Political party: Labour Co-operative
- Movement: Trade union; Co-operative

Neil Scobie Beaton (18 August 1880 – 23 October 1960) was a Scottish trade unionist and co-operative official.

Born in Buickloch in the Assynt area of the Scottish Highlands, Beaton moved to Edinburgh when he was eighteen and worked for a large grocers. After a few years, he found work with the St Cuthbert's Co-operative Association, which offered better pay and conditions, and this began Beaton's lifelong involvement with the co-operative movement.

Beaton also joined the National Amalgamated Union of Shop Assistants, and in 1911 was appointed as its full-time Scottish organiser, greatly increasing its membership in the nation. Through this position, he was active in the Scottish Trades Union Congress, serving as its treasurer in 1916/17 and its president in 1918/19. In 1919, he left the employment of the union to become an agent of the Scottish Co-operative Wholesale Society (SCWS), but initially he retained membership of the Shop Assistants' Union, and even served as its president in 1921/22.

With the SCWS, Beaton focused on establishing co-operative stores, particularly in the Highlands. He served as president of the SCWS from 1932 to 1946, during which time he was centrally involved in founding the International Co-operative Petroleum Agency and the International Co-operative Wholesale Agency. He was President of the Co-operative Congress in 1942, and also served on a number of government committees and quangos including the Royal Commission on the Press.

In his spare time, Beaton served on Edinburgh City Council for three years, as a Labour Co-operative member.

Trade union offices
Preceded by Hugh Lyon	President of the Scottish Trades Union Congress; 1919	Succeeded by William Shaw
Non-profit organization positions
Preceded by Fred Hayward	President of Co-operative Congress; 1942	Succeeded by Thomas Lawther
