= Campbell Christie =

Campbell Christie CBE (23 August 1937 – 28 October 2011) was the General Secretary of the Scottish Trades Union Congress from 1986 to 1998.

The son of a Galloway quarryman, he joined the civil service at the age of 17, rising through the ranks of the Civil Service Clerical Association. He became a leader of the "Sauchiehall Street Mafia", a left-wing association credited with helping radicalise the civil service unions in the 1960s.

In 1983, Christie stood unsuccessfully to become the General Secretary of the National Association of Local Government Officers.

Away from politics, Christie was chairman of Falkirk F.C. during the 2000s. During his tenure, Falkirk were promoted to the Scottish Premier League and developed the Falkirk Stadium. He stepped down in 2009, making the announcement after Falkirk played in the 2009 Scottish Cup Final.

Christie died at Strathcarron Hospice, Denny, Falkirk, aged 74, on 28 October 2011, after a short illness.

Political offices
Preceded by Jimmy Milne	General Secretary of the STUC; 1986–98	Succeeded by Bill Speirs
