= SNP Trade Union Group =

Affiliated organisation of the Scottish National Party

- Founded: 2014 (1965 or 1967/68)
- Location: Scotland
- Members: 16,500 (2016)
- Affiliations: Scottish National Party

The SNP Trade Union Group (TUG) is a constituent structure and the largest affiliated organisation of the Scottish National Party (SNP). Formed in the mid to late 1960s as the Association of Scottish Nationalist Trade Unionists (ASNTU), the original goals of the organisation were to recruit members to the SNP in the trade union movement and attract Labour-voting trade unionists to Scottish independence. Refounded as the TUG in 2014 in the lead up to the independence referendum, membership grew from 800 in September of that year to 16,000 by July 2015.

== Representation in the SNP ==
The TUG is allowed to send delegates to the SNP's annual National Conference and to National Council meetings, and has one representative on the party's National Executive Committee.

== See also ==
- Scottish National Party
- Scottish politics
- Trade unionism in Scotland
