= Craig Thomson (referee) =

Scottish football referee

Craig Thomson MBE
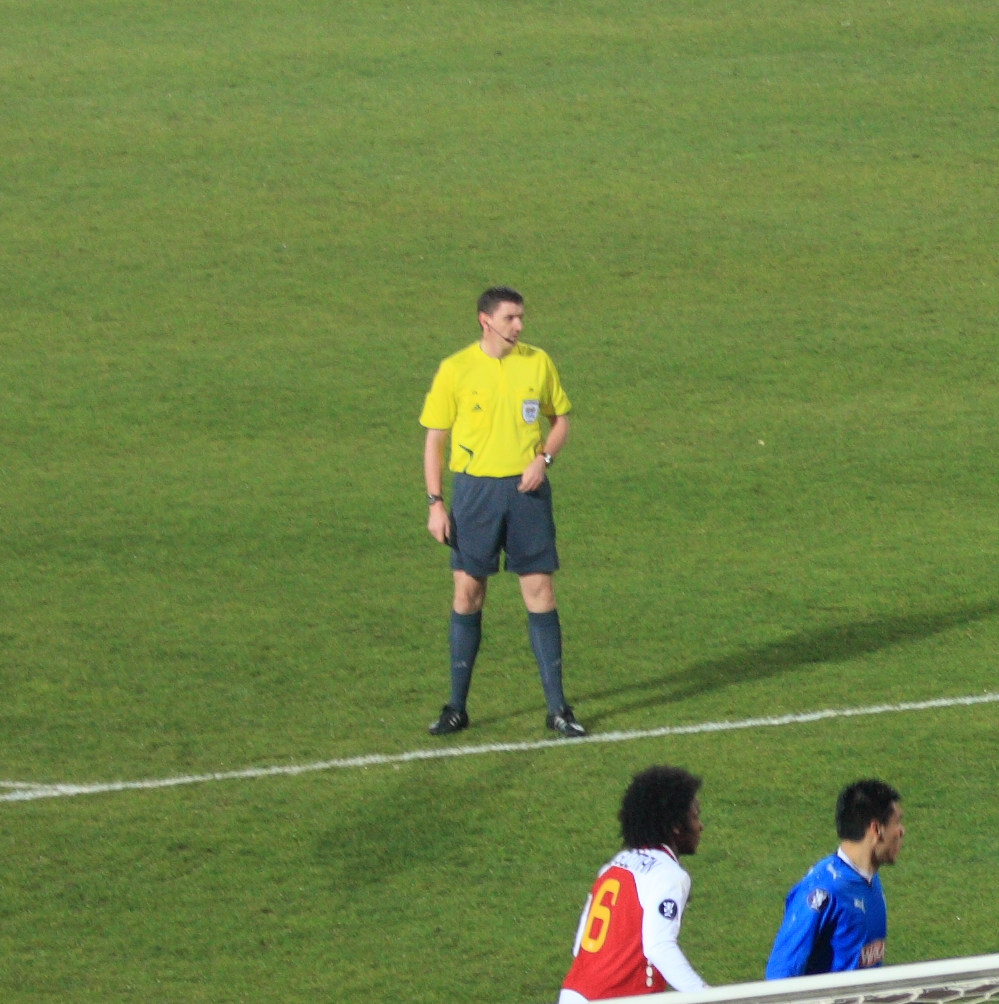
- Thomson (yellow shirt) refereeing a 2008–09 UEFA Cup game between Lech Poznań and Deportivo La Coruña.
- Full name: Craig Thomson
- Born: 20 June 1972 (age 54); Edinburgh, Scotland
- Other occupation: Solicitor

Domestic
Years	League	Role
1988–2019	Scottish Football Association	Referee
2000–2002	Scottish Football League	Referee
2002–2013	Scottish Premier League	Referee
2013–2019	Scottish Professional Football League	Referee

International
Years	League	Role
2003–2018	FIFA listed	Referee

Craig Alexander Thomson MBE (born 20 June 1972) is a Scottish former football referee, who was a match official between 1988 and 2019. Thomson originates from Paisley, Renfrewshire.

== Career ==
Thomson has officiated in the Scottish Premier League since 2002, and his first match in charge in that League was the fixture between St Johnstone and Hibernian on 12 May 2002. Thomson became a FIFA referee in 2003. His first International match for FIFA was the 4–1 defeat of Northern Ireland by Norway at Windsor Park, Belfast, on 18 February 2004. His next most notable match abroad was the 2006 FIFA World Cup qualifying match between the Faroe Islands and France on 8 September 2004, when he sent off Patrick Vieira during a 2–0 win for the French.

Domestically, he handled the 2006 Scottish Challenge Cup final between Ross County and Clyde. He was selected to referee during the UEFA Under-21 Championship 2007, held in the Netherlands. This included him issuing a second yellow card to Belgium's Marouane Fellaini in the 18th minute of their Group A match against Israel on 13 June in the Abe Lenstra Stadion. He was not appointed to referee any other games in the Championship. Thomson appeared as a fourth official at UEFA Euro 2008 in Switzerland and Austria.

Thomson took charge of the 2009 Scottish Cup Final between Rangers and Falkirk. In the 2010 Scottish League Cup Final between Rangers and St Mirren, Thomson sent off two Rangers players in Danny Wilson and Kevin Thomson. Other high-profile matches include a friendly between France and Spain on 3 March 2010 as well as a number of Old Firm matches.

On 12 October 2010, Thomson abandoned the Italy–Serbia Euro 2012 qualification match after seven minutes of play due to crowd disorder. Italy was later awarded a 3–0 victory by UEFA for the forfeit. The following month, Real Madrid players Sergio Ramos and Xabi Alonso appeared to deliberately incur second yellow cards from Thomson in a UEFA Champions League match, thereby serving a suspension in a dead rubber match. Then Real Madrid coach José Mourinho denied that the players had sought to be sent-off.

In the 2011 Scottish League Cup final between Celtic and Rangers, Thomson awarded Rangers a penalty, but then changed his decision. In the final Old Firm match of the 2010–11 season, Thomson awarded Celtic a penalty with seven minutes remaining, which was saved by Rangers goalkeeper Allan McGregor.

In 2011, Thomson refereed the France–Bosnia and Herzegovina Euro 2012 qualification match.

Thomson was appointed for the 2012 Scottish Cup final, which was won 5–1 by Hearts against their Edinburgh derby rivals Hibernian. His performance was criticised post match by Hibs striker Leigh Griffiths.

Thomson was selected in December 2011 to referee in the Euro 2012 final stages. He took charge of the group stage matches Portugal–Denmark and Czech Republic–Poland. Thomson was also in charge of a 2014 World Cup qualification match between Romania and the Netherlands on 16 October 2012 in Bucharest.

In March 2013, Thomson refereed a Champions League quarter-final match between Borussia Dortmund and Málaga, which Dortmund won with two late goals. Scottish FA chief executive Stewart Regan spoke in defence of Thomson, saying that he had performed well to earn the high-profile appointment and that the problems in the Borussia Dortmund–Málaga match had been due to his assistants. Thomson hoped to be selected for the 2014 World Cup final stages, but FIFA omitted him from their list of 14 officials for the tournament.

Thomson officiated the 2014 Scottish Cup Final at Celtic Park in Glasgow in which Perth side St Johnstone beat Dundee United 2–0.

He retired from refereeing at the end of the 2018–19 season.

Thomson was appointed Member of the Order of the British Empire (MBE) in the 2020 New Year Honours for services to football and charity in Scotland.

== Life outside football ==
Thomson is currently a solicitor who specifies in construction and engineering law.
