= George Carson (trade unionist) =

Scottish trade unionist (1848 – 1921)

George Carson (1848 – 1921) was a Scottish trade unionist.

Carson became prominent as a leader of the Scottish Tin Plate and Sheet Metal Workers' Society. In 1901, he was elected as secretary of the Parliamentary Committee of the Scottish Trades Union Congress (STUC), and in 1902 he became the leader of the associated Scottish Workers' Representation Committee. Also that year, he was elected as secretary of Glasgow Trades Council.

Carson was a founder member of the Scottish Labour Party in 1888. When the Independent Labour Party was founded in 1893, Carson unsuccessfully moved that it be named the "Socialist Labour Party", and was elected to its first National Administrative Council. In 1910, he was elected to Glasgow City Council for the Labour Party in Maryhill.

Trade union offices
Preceded by Margaret Irwin	Secretary of the Scottish Trades Union Congress; 1901 – 1918	Succeeded by Robert Allan
Preceded by A. J. Hunter	Secretary of Glasgow Trades Council; 1902 – 1916	Succeeded by William Shaw
Party political offices
Preceded by Robert Allan	Secretary of the Scottish Workers' Representation Committee; 1902 – 1909	Office abolished
