= George Middleton (trade unionist) =

Scottish trade union leader

George Walker Middleton CBE (4 April 1898 – 8 August 1971) was a Scottish trade union leader.

Middleton grew up in Glasgow and attended Keppochhill School before becoming active in the National Union of Distributive and Allied Workers. He joined the Communist Party of Great Britain (CPGB), becoming the party's Glasgow District Organiser, and stood unsuccessfully in Glasgow St Rollox at the 1929 general election. That year, he was a key leader of the Glasgow Hunger March.

Middleton served as secretary of the Glasgow Trades Council from 1942 until 1949, then in 1949 was elected as General Secretary of the Scottish Trades Union Congress (STUC), serving until 1963. In retirement, he chaired the Herring Industry Board and served as vice-chair of the Economic Planning Council for Scotland.

Middleton was appointed a Commander of the Order of the British Empire (CBE) in the 1952 New Year Honours.

Trade union offices
Preceded by Arthur Brady	Secretary of the Glasgow Trades and Labour Council; 1942 – 1949	Succeeded by J. C. Hill
Preceded by Charles Murdoch	General Secretary of the Scottish Trades Union Congress; 1949 – 1963	Succeeded by James Jack
