= Alain Hamer =

Luxembourgish football referee

- Full name: Alain Hamer
- Born: 10 December 1965 (age 60); Luxembourg City, Luxembourg

Domestic
| Years | League | Role |

International
| Years | League | Role |
| 1993– | FIFA-listed | Referee |

Alain Hamer (born 10 December 1965 in Luxembourg City) is a Luxembourgish football referee. He was a referee in the 1995 FIFA Women's World Cup. He has refereed over 50 matches in the UEFA Champions League, the first in 2000–01. He has also refereed a match in the African Cup of Nations and close to 30 matches in the French Ligue 1. He has been a FIFA referee since 1993.

Hamer was one of the referees who agreed to officiate Scottish Premier League matches in November 2010 after strike action was announced by the Scottish referees association. He was assigned the role of referee for the match between Celtic and Inverness Caledonian Thistle on the Saturday and the match between Dundee United and Rangers a day later. Hamer was available to referee Scottish games due to a strike in his native country.

Due to the lack of refereeing opportunities in Luxembourg, Hamer has frequently refereed in the professional leagues in the neighbouring countries of France and Belgium.

He is openly gay.

In a 2007 UEFA Euro qualifying match between Sweden and Iceland, with Sweden leading 4–0 in the second half, Markus Rosenberg of Sweden reached out with his right leg in the penalty area to settle down a chip. He then tried to lift the ball in the air, but it hit defender Ívar Ingimarsson's left arm which was reached out. The Swedes waved their hands to call for a penalty, and instead Ingimarsson picked up the ball and, under the erroneous belief that a foul had been called against them, passed the ball to Rosenberg who then passed to teammate Marcus Allbäck who fired the ball into the net for a 5–0 lead.

== See also ==
- Scottish football referee strike
