= James Jack (trade unionist) =

Scottish trade unionist

James Jack (6 December 1910 – 28 February 1987) was a Scottish trade union leader.

Jack grew up in Blantyre, South Lanarkshire and attended St John's Grammar School in Hamilton. He was elected as General Secretary of the Scottish Trades Union Congress (STUC) in 1963, and served until 1975. Following his retirement, he served on a large number of committees, including the Scottish Development Agency, Scottish Oil Development Council, and the Employment Appeal Tribunal. He stepped down from the last of these positions in 1983, and died four years later.

Trade union offices
Preceded by George Middleton	General Secretary of the STUC; 1963–1975	Succeeded by Jimmy Milne
