= Hugh Lyon =

Scottish trade union leader

Hugh Lyon (19 September 1872 – 1940) was a Scottish trade union leader.

Born in Glasgow, Lyon grew up in Falkirk. He left school at the age of eleven to work alongside his father at a local foundry. He joined the Falkirk Central Ironmoulders' Society, a very small union with only twelve members at the Carron Iron Works where he was based. As a result, he was immediately chosen as its shop steward, and rapidly built up membership at the works until all five hundred workers had joined.

Lyon's success at union organising led him to election as the treasurer, and then the secretary, of Falkirk Trades Council. He also began writing articles for the People's Journal. In 1901, he accepted a job as organiser of the new Carters' Association, moving back to Glasgow. The following year, he was elected by a large majority to take over as general secretary from John Simpson. He also joined the Independent Labour Party (ILP), and was immediately made chairman of its Springburn branch.

Lyon again proved his organisational skills at the Carters' Association, gaining recognition from the Glasgow Corporation and leading successful strikes. In 1908, he changed its name to the Scottish Horse and Motormen's Association, to aid in the recruitment of the drivers of motor vans. By 1914, membership had grown to 12,000 across the whole nation. Lyon represented the union on the Parliamentary Committee of the Scottish Trades Union Congress (STUC), serving as president of the STUC in 1918. In this role, he negotiated with the Clyde Workers' Committee (CWC) over their demand for a shorter working week. Initially championing the STUC policy of a 40-hour week, he joined the CWC strike for a 30-hour week, serving on the strike committee, but then told his members to return to work after he had secretly negotiated a 48-hour week agreement. This gave him a reputation in the trade union movement for untrustworthiness.

Lyon remained active in the ILP and, through it, in the Labour Party, through the 1900s and early 1910s. He stood for election to Glasgow Town Council, missing out in 1907, but taking a seat in 1911. He was strongly in support of British involvement in World War I, and served on various government committees, disassociating from his former comrades.

Lyon believed that motor vehicles were a passing craze, and that the union should focus on recruiting workers who used horses and carts. He increasingly separated the Horse and Motormen from other unions, refusing to join the National Transport Workers' Federation. This led to an increasing number of demarcation disputes, which the STUC attempted to adjudicate. He was undecided whether to support the 1926 UK general strike, and as a result, some members joined in, while others did not. These problems, coupled with increasing periods of poor health, led to disagreements with other officials in his own union, and he was eventually dismissed as general secretary in 1936, to be succeeded by Robert Taylor. He retired to Rothesay, and died four years later.

Trade union offices
Preceded by John Sampson	General Secretary of the Scottish Horse and Motormen's Association; 1902 – 1929	Succeeded by Robert Taylor
Preceded by Robert Allan	President of the Scottish Trades Union Congress; 1918	Succeeded by Neil S. Beaton
