= Bill Speirs =

British politician

- Born: 8 March 1952; Dumbarton, Scotland
- Died: 23 September 2009 (aged 57); Glasgow, Scotland

William MacLeod Speirs (8 March 1952 – 23 September 2009) was a Scottish trade union leader, a socialist and internationalist. He was General Secretary of the Scottish Trades Union Congress.

Speirs was a key figure in left-wing Scottish politics, chairing the Scottish council of the Labour party at the 1987 general election, and being a prominent member of various groups of the Bennite left, e.g. the Labour Co-ordinating Committee and Scottish Labour Action.

Speirs was also a high-profile advocate of Scottish devolution, e.g. he was instrumental in the creation of Scotland United, was a member of the Scottish Constitutional Convention, and was a member of the group that drafted the key document Scotland's Parliament, Scotland's Right in 1995

== Early life, education and work ==
Bill Speirs was born in Dumbarton and grew up in Renfrew. He went to school at the John Neilson Institution in Paisley and took a first class honours degree in Politics as the University of Strathclyde.

After graduating he continued with research at university and then worked as a lecturer at Cardonald College.

== Scottish TUC ==
Bill Speirs began his career with the Scottish Trades Union Congress when he was appointed to the post of Assistant Secretary in 1978. He became Deputy General Secretary in 1988, succeeding John Henry. In 1998, he became General Secretary, following Campbell Christie. He retired from the STUC in 2006 due to ill health.

== Scottish Labour Party ==
Bill Speirs was a lifelong member of the Labour Party. He was active in the National Organisation of Labour Students (NOLS) when he was at university. He served on the party's Scottish Executive in the late 1970s and the 1980s and was Chair of the Scottish Labour Party in 1987. In 1994, he was a signatory of the statement that launched the Scottish campaign for the retention of Clause IV, which in turn led to the creation of the Campaign for Socialism.

== Personal life ==
With his first wife Lynda, Bill had two children: a daughter, Jaki; and a son, David. The marriage ended in 1990.

In October 2002, Bill married his partner Pat Stuart in Glasgow.

Bill died in Glasgow on 23 September 2009 following a long illness.

Political offices
Preceded by Campbell Christie	General Secretary of the STUC; 1998–2006	Succeeded by Grahame Smith
