= Frank Donachy =

Scottish trade unionist

Frank Donachy OBE (20 February 1899 – 1 February 1970) was a Scottish trade unionist.

Born in Glasgow, Donachy served in World War I. After demobilisation, he became a railway signalman, and joined the National Union of Railwaymen (NUR). In 1941, he was appointed as the union's full-time Glasgow and West of Scotland Organiser, then moved to become East of Scotland Organiser. In 1949, he was also elected to the executive of the Scottish Trades Union Congress, serving as its president in 1957.

Donachy retired in 1959, and was made an Officer of the Order of the British Empire. He was appointed as deputy chair of the Scottish Area Board of the British Transport Commission, then in 1962 moved to sit on the British Railways Board. He died early in 1970.

Trade union offices
Preceded by David Currie	President of the Scottish Trades Union Congress; 1957	Succeeded by William Mowbray
