= Stockport Trades Union Council =

Stockport Trades Union Council (STUC)
- Formation: 1880
- Founded at: Stockport, Greater Manchester
- Type: Trades Union Council
- Purpose: Forwarding working-class causes within the greater Stockport area.
- Headquarters: Stockport, Greater Manchester
- Location: Stockport, United Kingdom
- Origins: 1880s Labour Movement, local hatteries
- Region served: Stockport, Hazel Grove, Cheadle, Heaton Moor, Heaton Norris
- Official language: English
- Website: https://www.stockport-tuc.org.uk/
- Formerly called: Stockport Trades Council

Stockport Trades Union Council (formerly Stockport Trades Council) is a Labour council based in Stockport in Greater Manchester. It was originally formed in 1880 for hatters and stonemasons, spinners, bricklayers, cardroom operatives, painters, engine-men and bakers among many other professions.

== History ==
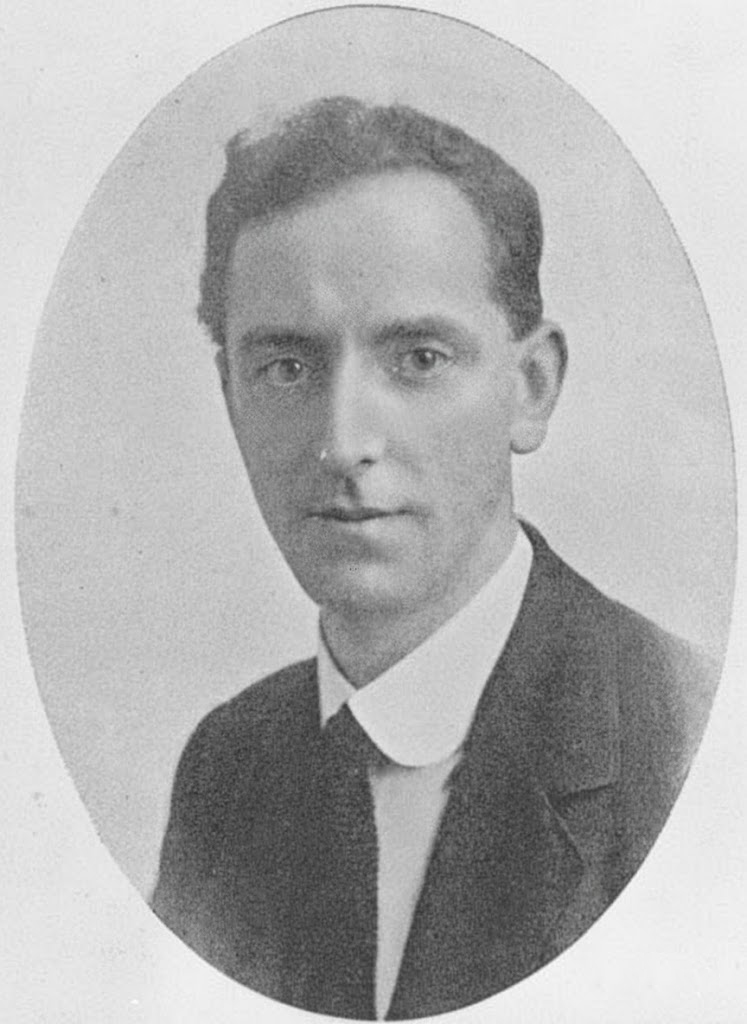
A photo of Alderman Fred Bowler, of the Stockport Trades Council in 1930 from the Labour Party World's Fair souvenir handbook. (Source: Stockport Image Archive)

During the 1880s up until the period after the World War II, Stockport was a crucial manufacturing town producing a variety of goods for national consumption, and in particular - hats. Stockport Trades Council was at the height of its powers, representing 70 different branches from 35 different trade unions and 16,000 members, but in the intervening years its role and position diminished, particularly from the 1980s onwards as Thatcherism began to take hold.

Its role within the Stockport area has been in defending working class politics, and during its early years it was involved in opposing the European single market and the Industrial Relations Act. From the 1960s it opposed Apartheid in South Africa and boycotted purchase of goods from South Africa.

It also widely opposed the Poll Tax introduced in the UK in 1989. Along with a local group, Stockport Against The Poll Tax, Stockport Trades Council was involved in co-ordinating and organising public demonstrations against the Poll Tax.

=== Role in Roberts-Arundel Strike (1966) ===
In 1966, the council's most famous role was in representing and supporting the workers of Roberts-Arundel. The dispute originated following the July 1966 takeover of the textile machinery firm Arundel-Coulthard by the Roberts Company of Sanford, North Carolina. Its owner, Robert E Pomeranz, who after an initial period of calm introduced managing director John Cox, laid off 51 employees, banned overtime and introduced a four-day workweek. Pomeranz then started to replace the 51 fired employees with female workers paid at one-third of regular workers wage, an action the Amalgamated Engineering Union (AEU) identified as a breach of established national procedure agreements.

On 28 November 1966, 140 workers commenced strike action, leading to their summary dismissal by the firm in December. Subsequently, Roberts-Arundel withdrew from the Engineering Employers' Association and revoked trade union recognition, opting to recruit non-union labour following a failed intervention from Harold Wilson along with representatives of the AEU. The actions were organised with local trades unions, with Stockport Trades Union Council being central to the organising of the public actions in favour of the strike and in mobilising public opinion against the actions of Roberts.

The ensuing twelve months were characterized by daily picketing, large-scale street demonstrations involving up to 1,000 participants, and violent confrontations between pickets, workers, and police, resulting in numerous injuries and arrests. During this time it has been alleged that the Chief Constable Henry Watson of the Cheshire Constabulary, called the district secretary of the AEU and threatened to invoke the Riot Act to grant him rights to "shoot to kill" the strikers.

The industrial action also involved other trade unions both locally, nationally and internationally.. The International Metalworkers Federation pledged solidarity. Marxist Tony Cliff noted that activists and trade unions attended "day and night" to man the picket lines outside the factory

Industrialists and politicians noted the severe economic impact of the dispute on the greater Manchester area, estimating a loss of approximately 1.25 million man-hours and up to £2.25 million in production. Government intervention involved eleven separate meetings with the Minister of Labour and various mediation attempts by local Members of Parliament and the Mayor of Stockport. These efforts, including the "Barnard plan" for phased re-engagement, ultimately failed.

In December 1967, the company announced its intention to cease manufacturing operations in Stockport by mid-January 1968, transitioning to a small service-based unit. Parliamentary debates held on 6 December 1967 highlighted the dispute as a unique failure of industrial relations, with the Joint Parliamentary Secretary to the Ministry of Labour describing the company's tactics as "provocative" and "arbitrary".

While the dispute raised concerns regarding the influence of foreign capital on British employment practices, government representatives at the time alleged that the firm’s conduct was an exception to the typically positive industrial relations maintained by American corporations in the United Kingdom. This has been disputed by trade union sources.

== See also ==
- Official Website - Launched in December 2025
