= Grahame Smith =

British trade unionist

Grahame Thomas Smith CBE (born 8 January 1959) is a Scottish former trade unionist, who served as General Secretary of the Scottish Trades Union Congress (STUC).

== Education ==
Smith attended Bishopbriggs High School, which merged into Bishopbriggs Academy, between 1971 and 1977. He is a graduate of Strathclyde University, where he obtained an Honours Degree in Economics and Industrial Relations.

== Honours and recognition ==
Smith was appointed Commander of the Order of the British Empire (CBE) in the 2022 New Year Honours, for services to the Trade Union Movement and the Promotion of Fair Work in Scotland.

Political offices
Preceded by Bill Speirs	General Secretary of the STUC; 2006–2020	Succeeded by Rozanne Foyer
