= Scottish Commercial Motormen's Union =

- Merged into: Transport and General Workers' Union
- Founded: 1898
- Dissolved: 1971
- Headquarters: 308 Albert Drive, Glasgow
- Location: United Kingdom
- Members: 12,000 (1912)
- Publication: Highway
- Affiliations: TUC, STUC, Labour

The Scottish Commercial Motormen's Union was a trade union in the United Kingdom. It merged with the Transport and General Workers' Union in 1971.

== History ==
The union was founded in 1898 as the Scottish Carters' Association. Hugh Lyon was appointed as its organiser in 1901, and was elected as general secretary the following year, at which point the union was heavily indebted and had only 300 members. He spent his first five months supporting a strike in Falkirk; during this time, the central office closed down and the union nearly shut down, but the strike was so successful that the union's executive decided to retain Lyon.

Lyon gained recognition for the union from Glasgow Town Council in 1904, and several strikes were won early in the 1910s, giving it membership across the nation, peaking at around 12,000 in 1912. In 1908, it was renamed as the Scottish Horse and Motormen's Association, in order to assist with the recruitment of drivers of motor vans. However, Lyon incorrectly believed that motor vehicles were a passing craze, and that the union should focus on recruiting carters. This led to a decline in membership during the 1920s and 1930s, worsened by Lyon's refusal to allow the union to join the Transport Workers' Federation, which led to a large number of demarcation disputes. Finally, in 1936, the union's executive lost patience and dismissed him.

== Election results ==
The union sponsored a Labour Party candidate in the 1970 general election:

Constituency	Candidate	Votes	Percentage	Position
Moray and Nairn	Peter Talbot	6,452	22.8	3

== General Secretaries ==
1898: John Sampson
1902: Hugh Lyon
1936: Robert Taylor
1944: John Brannigan
1959: Alex Kitson

== See also ==
- List of trade unions
- Transport and General Workers' Union
- TGWU amalgamations
