= Stewart Regan =

English sports administrator

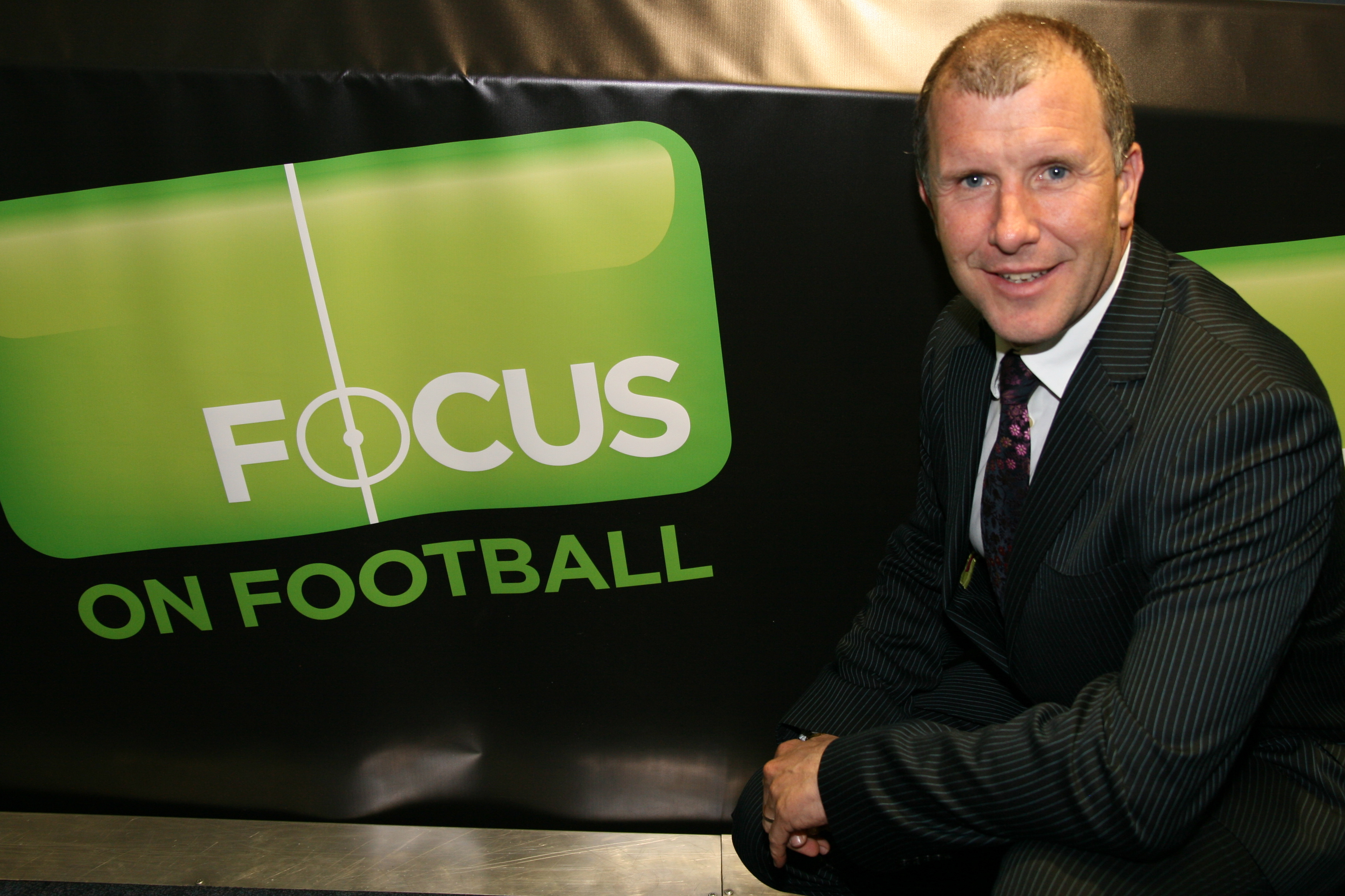
Stewart Regan, CEO Scottish FA, 2011

Stewart Regan (born 10 February 1964 in County Durham) is an English sports administrator who is the former CEO of Yorkshire County Cricket Club and the Scottish Football Association. He was also Director of the English Football League Championship, a position he took up following 17 years in the brewing industry with both John Smith's Brewery (Courage Ltd) and Bass Brewery. Regan was Strategic Planning Director for Bass and part of the senior team involved in the sale of the company's brewing arm to the American brewer, Coors.

In 2003/04, the leading clubs in the EFL Championship appointed Regan as their Managing Director with a brief to establish the second tier of English football as a strong, commercially viable league for aspiring clubs hoping to access the Premiership. Regan quickly brought Wickes into the fold as an Official Partner of the Championship and developed the profile of the league through the Everything to Play For campaign which highlighted the excitement of the end of season play-offs, specifically the play-off final, the 'richest game on earth'. In 2006, he was recruited by Yorkshire County Cricket Club as their CEO with a specific brief to develop the club following the acquisition of the famous Headingley Cricket Ground from Leeds Rugby Limited. This purchase was concluded by Colin Graves, former chairman of the England & Wales Cricket Board who at the time was chairman of the club and successful owner/founder of Costcutter, a convenience store chain in the UK. Regan led the development of the cricket ground culminating in the design and build of the Will Alsop inspired Carnegie Pavilion, a dual use facility built at a cost of £25m and opened in 2009 as part of a partnership with Leeds Metropolitan University (now Leeds Beckett) and Leeds City Council. The university partnership, which included sponsorship of the club's Twenty20 team, Yorkshire Carnegie, staff and student personal development opportunities, research assignments and player performance initiatives has subsequently been replicated by many professional sports clubs across the country. As a result of improvements made to the cricket ground at Headingley, Yorkshire County Cricket Club were able to retain their staging agreement with the England & Wales Cricket Board to host international cricket.

Regan took up the position as chief executive of the Scottish Football Association on 5 October 2010, replacing Gordon Smith. Within the first months of his appointment at the SFA, Regan had to manage the Scottish football referee strike, drafting in foreign officials as replacements to ensure the organisation was not in breach of contract with its broadcasting partners. In June 2011 Regan gained unanimous support from all 93 members of the association to modernise the game in Scotland and his strategic plan Scotland United: A 2020 vision was rolled out across the country.

In 2012, the Scottish Government appointed Regan to chair the steering group responsible for developing Scotland's first National Performance Centre. After a competitive bidding process, Heriot Watt University were awarded the contract to design and build the centre. Oriam was opened at a cost of £33m in August 2016, on time and within budget; it became the home for the SFA's Performance Department and all of Scotland's national football teams.

During his time at the SFA, the Scotland men's national squad did not qualify for a major tournament and Regan parted company with both Craig Levein and Gordon Strachan, both of whom had two campaigns as national coach. On the other hand, the women's national team coached by Anna Signeul qualified for the first time ever for the UEFA Women's Euro Championships held in the Netherlands in 2017.

Regan was also Chairman of Hampden Park Ltd, a wholly owned subsidiary of the SFA, from 2015 to 2018 and led the winning Glasgow bid to host the 2020 UEFA European Championship (which took place in 2021 due to the impact of the COVID-19 pandemic). He was appointed by UEFA as a director of UEFA Club Competitions S.A, a joint venture with the ECA responsible for the business affairs of the organisation's club competitions. In addition, he was Vice Chairman of UEFA's Marketing Advisory Committee during the period 2012 to 2018.

Regan resigned his position at the Scottish Football Association in February 2018 in the wake of negative publicity surrounding the decision of the Northern Ireland national coach Michael O'Neill to stay in Belfast having been offered the Scotland job. In April 2018, he founded Ascend Global Consulting Ltd and is currently advising a number of sports organisations around the world.
