= Scottish Typographical Association =

Former Scottish trade union

- Merged into: Society of Graphical and Allied Trades
- Founded: 1853
- Dissolved: 1974
- Location: Scotland
- Members: 3,925 (1907)
- Affiliations: TUC, STUC, P&KTF

Scottish Typographical Association was a labour union representing typesetters in Scotland. It was founded in 1853. In 1974, it merged with the Society of Graphical and Allied Trades (SOGAT).

The formation of the union was organised by the Glasgow Typographical Society, although it incorporated local societies in other Scottish burghs. Membership gradually rose, reaching 4,700 in 1910. The union was a founding member of the Printing and Kindred Trades Federation and, following a demarcation decision of the federation in 1928, it organised only assistants in case and machine rooms in Aberdeen, Dundee, Edinburgh and Glasgow, but all typographical workers in the rest of Scotland.

The union changed its name to the Scottish Graphical Association in 1973, but merged into SOGAT shortly afterwards.

== General Secretaries ==
1853: John Baird
1859: William Govan
1871: George Craig
1872: Simon Martin
1874: John Battersby
1887: Robert Johnstone
1893: John Templeton
1911: John White
1913: James Brown
1917: John Watt
1921: Robert Watson
1942: Robert H. Lean
1951: Harry Girdwood
1961: Peter Whigham
