= Charles Murdoch (footballer) =

Scottish footballer

Personal information
- Full name: Charles Murdoch
- Place of birth: Scotland
- Position: Right half

Senior career*
Years	Team	Apps	(Gls)
1906–1907	Newcastle United	0	(0)
1907	St Bernard's	3	(1)
- * Club domestic league appearances and goals

Charles Murdoch was a Scottish footballer who played in the Scottish League for St Bernard's as a right half.

== Personal life ==
Murdoch served in the British Army during the First World War.

== Career statistics ==
Appearances and goals by club, season and competition
Club	Season	League			National Cup		Other		Total	
Club	Season	Division	Apps	Goals	Apps	Goals	Apps	Goals	Apps	Goals
St Bernard's	1907–08	Scottish Second Division	3	0	0	0	1 (Note: Appearance in Scottish Qualifying Cup)	0	4	0
Career total			3	0	0	0	1	0	4	0
