= Labour council =

Association of labour unions

A labour council, trades council or industrial council is an association of labour unions or union branches in a given area. Most commonly, they represent unions in a given geographical area, whether at the district, city, region, or provincial or state level. They may also be based on a particular industry rather than geographical area, as for example, in the Maritime Council of Australia which co-ordinated the waterfront and maritime unions involved in the 1890 Australian Maritime Dispute.

Affiliates of labour councils are trade union branches or locals, and occasionally other labour movement organisations. Citywide or provincial councils may have district or regional labour council affiliates as well as trade unions. Some labour councils restrict their membership to organisations which are affiliated with a particular national trade union federation, such as many state-level labour councils in the United States, which are chartered from the AFL–CIO national confederation.

Finances are usually obtained through an affiliation fee, often based on a per capita levy on the membership of affiliates. In Australia, trades and labour councils often have their own hall and offices known as a trades hall, with the term trades hall often used as a colloquial expression for the labour council or trades hall council.

== Note on usage ==
Labour councils are a widespread phenomenon, but are given different names in different English-speaking areas. Labour council is most common in Canada and Australia, labor council is used in the (USA) and trades council, trades union council or trades and labour council in the United Kingdom (and until recently was widespread in Australia) and some other countries. Another term sometimes used is industrial council, as in for example, the Barrier Industrial Council of Broken Hill in Australia.

National associations of trade unions, such as British Trades Union Congress may also be considered a labour council, though the term often implies a primarily local organisation.

== History ==
Labour councils were formed to meet a need to co-ordinate trade union activity in a geographical region. The earliest examples of this form of organisation can be found in the medieval craft guilds and craft halls that developed in European cities. An example of this is the historic Glasgow Trades Hall wherein the 14 incorporated trades of Glasgow each year elected members of the Trades House, headed by the Deacon Convener of the Trades

The trade union activity of the late 19th century in particular spurred the establishment of labour councils and trades councils across North America, Australia and Britain.

Some notable events in the history of labour councils include:

- 1791–1794 – Glasgow Trades Hall built to serve as a public hall and meeting place for the city's Trades House and 14 Incorporated Crafts
- 1834 – attempt to establish the Grand National Consolidated Trades Union in Britain
- 1848 – first Liverpool Trades Council founded
- 1856 – Melbourne Trades Hall Committee formed. Now known as Victorian Trades Hall Council
- 1858 – Sheffield Trades Council and Glasgow Trades Council founded
- 1859 – Melbourne Trades Hall opened in May. Edinburgh Trades Council and Bolton Trades Council founded
- 1860 – London Trades Council and Leeds Trades Council founded
- 1861 – Dundee Trades Union Council founded
- 1864 – Manchester and Salford Trades Council formed.
- 1868 – First Trades Union Congress called by Manchester and Salford Trades Council in Manchester, with invitations being sent to "trades councils and other similar federations of trade societies" only.
- 1871 – Trades & Labor Council of Sydney formed.
- 1871 – Toronto Trades and Labour Assembly (now the Toronto and York Labour Council) formed
- 1880 - Stockport Trades Union Council formed.
- 1893 – San Francisco Labor Council chartered.
- 1895 – Trades Union Congress (Britain) restricted to unions, with trades councils excluded altogether to avoid dual representation.
- 1896 – Building Trades Council (now known as the San Francisco Building and Construction Trades Council is formed in San Francisco, California, uniting various craft unions in the construction industry.
- 1926 – In Britain, trades councils play a prominent role in organising the General Strike

== See also ==
- Bourses du travail in France
- Trades Hall
- Trade union
- National trade union centre (or labour federation)
- Labour history
