= Scottish Socialist Party (1932) =

- Chairperson: Patrick Dollan
- General Secretary: Arthur Brady
- Founded: 1932
- Dissolved: 1940
- Split from: Independent Labour Party
- Merged into: Labour Party
- Newspaper: Forward
- Membership (1932): 2,200
- Ideology: Socialism; Social democracy
- Political position: Left-wing

The Scottish Socialist Party (SSP) was an organisation of former Independent Labour Party members who wished to remain part of the Labour Party after their former party disaffiliated.

By the early 1930s, there was strong support in the Independent Labour Party (ILP) for disaffiliation from the Labour Party. This came to a head after the Labour Party refused to endorse ILP candidates at the 1931 general election. Several leading Scottish members disagreed with the ILP's moves to disaffiliate, including chairman of the Scottish ILP Patrick Dollan, David Kirkwood, who was one of the party's five MPs, and former MP Tom Johnston. They formed the Scottish Independent Labour Party Affiliation Committee in 1932, campaigning to reverse the policy. However, this open opposition to a key party policy was not accepted by the majority in the ILP, and the three were expelled in mid-August. They formed the Scottish Socialist Party at the end of the month, and were immediately successful in affiliating it to the Labour Party. The new party initially claimed to have 1,000 members, and by November, it claimed 2,200. This compared with 3,300 Scottish ILP members before the split.

The party's first chair was Dollan, with councillors Andrew Gilzean as vice-chair and Arthur Brady as secretary. The party was boosted by Neil Maclean, an MP who had resigned from the ILP shortly before the 1931 election, while other members included former MP James Welsh, and future MP Thomas Cook.

The ownership of property and funds held by branches which had left the ILP and joined the SSP was an immediate cause of conflict. This led to lengthy legal action, with the Labour Party financially supporting the SSP side. The party gained control of Forward, which had formerly been the newspaper of the Glasgow ILP, and from 1934, this became the party's official publication.

At the 1935 United Kingdom general election, the organisation sponsored four Labour Party candidates, none of whom were successful.

In all matters other than Labour Party affiliation, the new group maintained the policies of the ILP. Prior to forming the party, Dollan had worked closely with E. F. Wise in England, who hoped that the Scottish members would join the new Socialist League. Although the two worked closely together, the Socialist League confined its activities to England. In 1936, unification of the two was again planned, with the SSP conceding to the Socialist League's support for the Communist Party of Great Britain to affiliate to the Labour Party, but this foundered over the Socialist League's now cordial relationship with the ILP, while the SSP still had a remaining financial dispute, concerning £200 of funds from the Hamilton branch.

The SSP had a strong pacifist section, and in 1935, Dollan declared it to be an "anti-war party". However, it was always supportive of the Spanish Republic in the Spanish Civil War, and tried to influence Labour Party policy in favour of supplying arms to The outbreak of World War II was more problematic for the party; although many members opposed British participation in the conflict, Dollan supported Neville Chamberlain's initiatives to prepare for war.

Eventually, in 1940, the Court of Session found in favour of the ILP in regard to the remaining legal disputes, and the SSP decided to dissolve itself into the Labour Party.

== Election results ==
The party sponsored four Labour Party candidates at the 1935 United Kingdom general election, each of whom took a close second place.

Constituency	Candidate	Votes	Percentage	Position
Edinburgh Central	Andrew Gilzean	9,659	41.4	2
Glasgow Kelvingrove	Hector McNeil	14,951	48.1	2
Glasgow Partick	Adam McKinlay	13,316	46.0	2
West Renfrewshire	Jean Mann	12,407	38.8	2
