= Norman Hogg (politician, born 1907) =

Scottish politician (1907–1975)

Norman Hogg (22 November 1907 – 25 June 1975) was a Scottish Labour Party politician.

Hogg worked as a baker and joined the Scottish Union of Bakers and Allied Workers, later becoming its full-time North of Scotland organiser, then winning promotion to become national organiser. At the 1950 UK general election, the union sponsored him as a Labour Party candidate in South Angus. He took second place, with a quarter of the vote. He stood in West Aberdeenshire at the 1951 UK general election, again taking second place.

Hogg served on Aberdeen City Council for 21 years, and was Lord Provost of Aberdeen from 1964 to 1967. He was made a Commander of the Order of the British Empire.

Hogg's son, also Norman Hogg, became a Labour Party Member of Parliament.

Civic offices
Preceded by John Graham	Lord Provost of Aberdeen; 1964–1967	Succeeded by Robert Lennox
