= Football on British television =

This article concerns current football broadcasting rights held by television companies in the United Kingdom.

== BBC Sport ==
- FIFA World Cup Finals - Live coverage and highlights on BBC Sport (Shared with ITV Sport)
- Premier League - Highlights on BBC Sport (Live coverage on Sky Sports & TNT Sports)
- FA Cup - Live matches & Highlights on BBC Sport (Shared with TNT Sports)
- FA Community Shield - Highlights on BBC Sport (Live on TNT Sports)
- FA Women's Cup - Live coverage of final on BBC Sport
- FA Women's Super League - Highlights on BBC Sport (Live on TNT Sports)
- FIFA Women's World Cup - Live coverage & Highlights on BBC Sport
- UEFA Women's Championship - Live coverage & Highlights on BBC Sport

== ITV Sport ==
- FIFA World Cup Finals - Live coverage and highlights on ITV Sport (Shared with BBC Sport)
- England Internationals - All England European Championship Qualifiers, World Cup Qualifiers & Friendly Matches Live on ITV Sport (Highlights on Sky Sports)
- European Qualifiers - 1 non home nations Match per Matchday Live on ITV Sport & highlights of all home nations (Live on Sky Sports)
- FA Youth Cup - Live Matches on ITV Sport (Shared TNT sports)

== Sky Sports ==
- Premier League - Live coverage & Highlights on Sky Sports (Live Coverage also on BT Sport & Highlights on BBC Sport)
- England football team - Highlights of every England Qualifier on Sky Sports (Live on ITV Sport)
- The Football League, Football League Cup & Football League Trophy - Live coverage & Highlights on Sky Sports (Highlights on Quest)
- Scottish Premiership & Scottish Football League - Live coverage & Highlights on Sky Sports (Also live with BT Sport & highlights on BBC Sport Scotland)
- Scottish Cup - Live coverage & Highlights on Sky Sports (Shared with BBC Sport Scotland)
- Scottish Youth Cup - Live coverage on Sky Sports
- Wales football team - All matches live on Sky Sports (Highlights on S4C & ITV Sport)
- Northern Ireland football team - All matches live on Sky Sports (Highlights on ITV Sport)
- Scotland football team - All matches live on Sky Sports (Highlights on ITV Sport)

== TNT Sport ==
- Premier League - Live Coverage & highlights on BT Sport (Also live on Sky Sports & Highlights on BBC Sport)
- FA Cup - Live Coverage & highlights on BT Sport (Shared with BBC Sport)
- UEFA Champions League - Live Coverage & highlights on BT Sport
- UEFA Europa League - Live Coverage & highlights on BT Sport
- UEFA Super Cup - Live Coverage & highlights on BT Sport
- National League - Live Coverage & highlights on BT Sport
- FA Trophy Live Coverage & highlights on BT Sport
- FA Youth Cup Live Coverage on BT Sport (Shared with ITV Sport)
- FA Community Shield - Live Coverage on BT Sport (Highlights on BBC Sport)
- England national under-21 football team Live Coverage on BT Sport
- Scottish Professional Football League Live Coverage & highlights on BT Sport (Also live on Sky Sports & Highlights on BBC Sport Scotland)
- Scottish League Cup - Live coverage & Highlights on BBC Sport Scotland
- Bundesliga, 2. Bundesliga - Live Coverage on BT Sport
- Ligue 1 & Coupe de la Ligue - Live Coverage on BT Sport
- A-League - Live Coverage on BT Sport
- FA WSL - Live Coverage on BT Sport (Highlights on BBC Sport)

== Eleven Sports ==
- La Liga - Live coverage & highlights on Eleven Sports
- Segunda División - Highlights on Eleven Sports
- Copa del Rey - Live coverage & highlights on Eleven Sports
- Serie A - Live coverage & highlights on Eleven Sports
- Coppa Italia - Live coverage & highlights on Eleven Sports
- DFB Pokal - Live coverage & highlights on Eleven Sports
- Eredivisie - Live coverage & highlights on Eleven Sports
- Chinese Super League - Live coverage & highlights on Eleven Sports
- Major League Soccer - Live coverage & highlights on Eleven Sports

== Premier Sports & Freesports ==
- Primeira Liga - Live Coverage on Premier Sports & Freesports

== BBC Sport Scotland ==
- Scottish Premier League - Live coverage & Delayed coverage on BBC Alba & Highlights on BBC Sport Scotland (Live on Sky Sports & BT Sport)
- Scottish Football League - Live on BBC Alba & Highlights on BBC Sport Scotland (Live on Sky Sports & BT Sport)
- Scottish Cup - Live coverage & Highlights on BBC Sport Scotland (Also live on Sky Sports)
- Scottish Challenge Cup - Live on BBC Alba

== BBC Sport NI ==
- IFA Premiership - Highlights on BBC Sport NI
- Irish Cup - Live coverage & Highlights on BBC Sport NI
- Irish League Cup - Live coverage & Highlights on BBC Sport NI
- Milk Cup - Live coverage & Highlights on BBC Sport NI

== S4C ==
- Welsh Premier League - Live coverage & Highlights on S4C
- Welsh Cup - Live coverage & Highlights on S4C
- Sgorio - Selected Highlights from European Football
- Welsh national team - Highlights of Welsh matches on S4C (Live on Sky Sports)

== See also ==
- IFA Premiership
- Premier League
- Scottish Premier League
- Serie A
- Russian Premier League
- Bundesliga
- Major League Soccer
- Portuguese Liga
- La Liga
- Eredivisie
