= Aberdeen Trades Union Council =

Group of affiliated trade unions in Scotland

ATUC
- Aberdeen Trades Union Council
- Founded: 1868
- Headquarters: 22a Adelphi, Aberdeen, Scotland
- Affiliations: STUC
- Website: www.atuc.org.uk

Aberdeen Trades Union Council (ATUC) is the body made up of affiliated trade union branches and organisations working in the Aberdeen and Aberdeenshire area to promote the interests of workers in the region. The ATUC provides services to affiliated branches on a wide range of industrial, social and community issues and is affiliated to the STUC. It has an office based in Aberdeen, Scotland.

== History ==
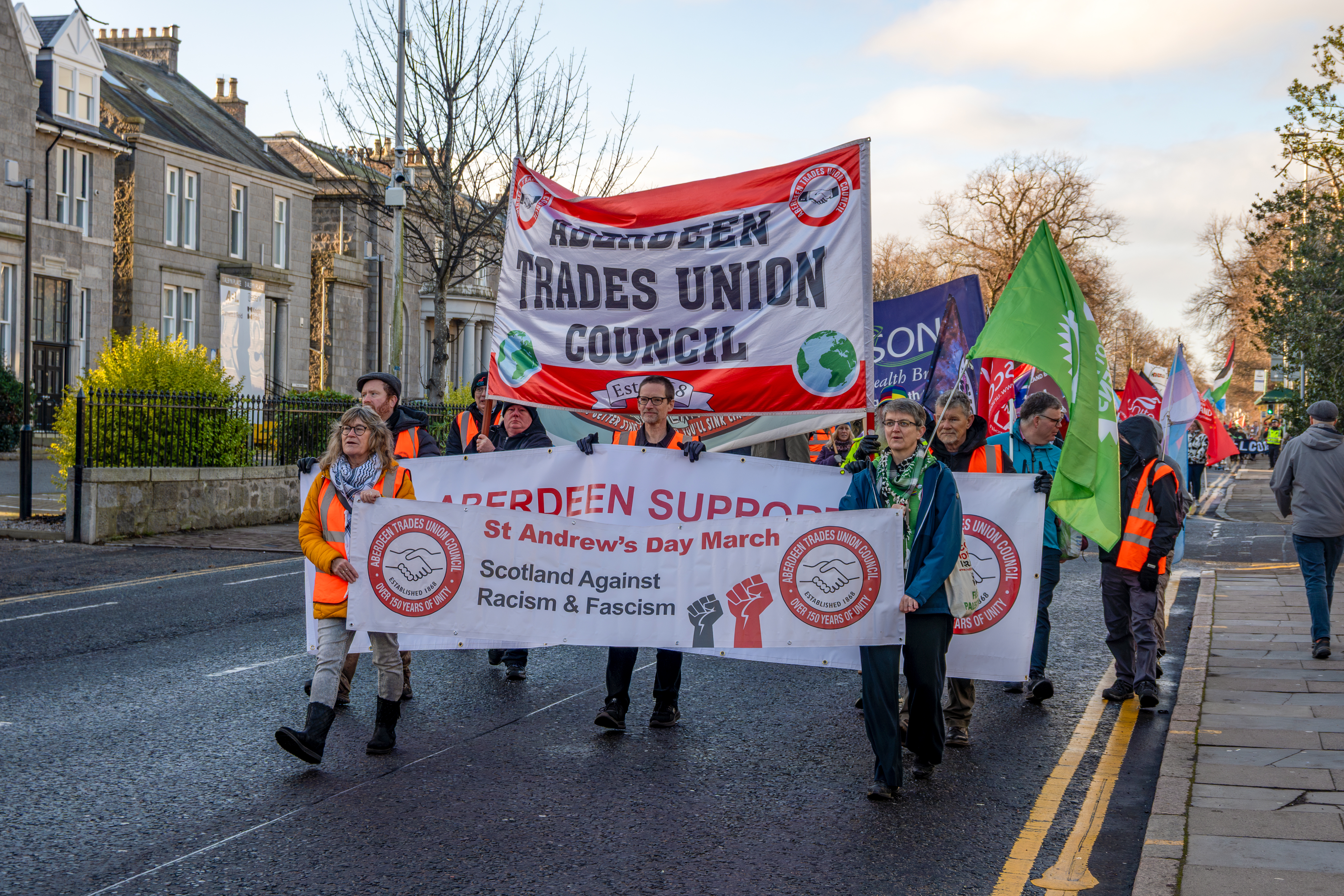
The ATUC leading a march on 28 November 2025

Trade unionists in Aberdeen first formed a committee in 1846, in order to support joiners who were on strike. This committee lasted for three years, and no further organisation was established until 1868, when stonemasons in the town held a ten-week strike. John Jessiman of the Associated Carpenters and Joiners of Scotland founded the Aberdeen United Trades Council, with the aim of establishing a conciliation board to resolve future disputes. This was not achieved, but the council endured. Originally, thirteen trade union branches affiliated, but by 1873 it had more than fifty delegates.

Even by the 1880s, the council represented only 2,000 workers, but its ability to support unions on strike, campaign for shorter working hours and the municipalisation of utilities, gave it prominent role in the city. Socialists increasingly took leading roles on the council, focusing on organising unskilled workers, and setting up a union of women workers and the Scottish Farm Servants' Union. In 1890, it finally achieved its aim of establishing a conciliation board but, since its rulings were not binding, it achieved little, considering only nine cases by 1906.

The council first began electoral activity by opposing the re-election of Lord Provost of Aberdeen George Jamieson. By 1879, it was backing favoured candidates in the School Board election, and it first supported independent labour candidates in the 1884 local elections, with James Forbes and George Maconnachie elected. In 1891, it was a founding affiliate of the Scottish United Trades Councils Labour Party, and sponsored Henry Hyde Champion in Aberdeen South at the 1892 general election, although he could only take third place in the poll. At the 1895 general election, there was another independent labour candidate, John Lincoln Mahon, but the council eventually decided not to back his candidacy.

The council also engaged with the broader trade union movement. It hosted the Trades Union Congress in Aberdeen in 1884, and in 1895 it hosted a meeting of Scottish trade unions and trades councils which led to the formation of the Scottish Trades Union Congress (STUC), in 1897. In 1973, it became the leading organisation in the new Grampian Federation of Trades Councils.

Early in its history, the council met at the Queens Rooms on Union Street, but in 1892 it purchased its own headquarters on Belmont Street, and four years later opened a purpose-built trades hall, with murals by Douglas Strachan. It relocated to a former warehouse in 1956, then to its social club, and now once more meets at hired rooms.

The trades council continued to grow until 1920, when it reached a peak affiliated membership of 16,684. That year, it formed a council of action to oppose British intervention in the Polish-Soviet War. It co-ordinated local activity during the 1926 UK general strike, then during the 1930s focused on organising workers who were not trade union members. From 1918, the council was known as the Aberdeen Trades and Labour Council, and incorporated the local Labour Party. This arrangement ended in 1935, and it broke all links with the party in 1937 in order to take part in the Communist Party of Great Britain's National Unemployed Workers' Movement and United Front Against Fascism. While a merger with the NUWM was proposed, this did not occur, and the council soon returned to the Labour Party.

The council remained prominent in the STUC as the Aberdeen Trades Council and began growing again, membership reaching a new peak of 26,000 in 1980. Since then, its membership has declined in line with the Scottish trade union movement. In 2003, it was officially renamed as the Aberdeen Trades Union Council.

== Secretaries ==
1868: Alexander Rennie
1877: William Brown
1878: John W. Annand
1885: James Forbes
1887: William Johnston
1907: G. A. Fraser
1913: James Balfour
1925: G. R. Mcintosh
1935: William Urquhart
1937: George Maitland
as of 1939: William McLean Brown
1948: Jimmy Milne
1969:
as of 1980: Ron Webster
1994: James Lamond
1998: Sultan Feroz
2012: Brian Carroll
2014: Nathan Morrison
2015: Laura McDonald
2016: Post vacant
2017: John Connon and Gerry McCabe
2018: Fiona Napier

2020: Sasha Bryden

2022: Fiona Napier
2023: John Singer
2024: Andrew MacGregor & Douglas Haywood

== Presidents ==
1868: Alexander Kidd
1875: Thomas Gill
1877: George Taylor
1879: William Anderson
1882: William Elphinstone
1883: James C. Thompson
1886: George Bisset
1889: William Livingstone
1890: Thomas Nicol
1895: John Keir
1898: Alexander Robertson
1900: John H. Elric
1903: H. H. Duncan
1911: Joseph Forbes Duncan
1913: David Palmer
1918: James C Allan
1919: George Catto
1922: G. R. McIntosh
1923: W. Williamson
1925: Thomas Brown
1927: P. Irvine
1928: Charles Bathgate
1929: Robert A. R. Fraser
1930: Robert Raffan
1935: M. Hetherington
1938: James J. Stewart
1952: William James Fraser
1969: James Lamond
1982: Jurgen Thomaneck
1990s: Sultan Feroz
2014: Alan Robertson
2015: Kate Ramsden
2017: Kevin Hutchens and Tyrinne Rutherford
2018: Kathleen Kennedy
2019: Sasha Brydon

2021: Graeme Farquhar

== See also ==
- Scottish Trades Union Congress
- List of trade unions
- List of federations of trade unions
