= Associated Carpenters and Joiners of Scotland =

Scottish trade union

- Predecessor: United Joiners of Glasgow and the West of Scotland
- Merged into: Amalgamated Society of Carpenters and Joiners
- Founded: 1861
- Dissolved: 1910
- Location: Scotland
- Members: 9,787 (1899)
- Key people: William Paterson (Gen Sec)
- Affiliations: TUC

The Associated Carpenters and Joiners of Scotland was a trade union representing woodworkers in Scotland.

== History ==
The union was founded in 1861 on the initiative of the small United Joiners of Glasgow and the West of Scotland. Initially, it had only 630 members, but it grew with branches established across Scotland, and also in England and Ireland, as members travelled to find work. William Matson proposed that the union merge with the Amalgamated Society of Carpenters and Joiners (ASC&J) as early as 1862, but his suggestion was unpopular and was not implemented.

Membership reached 5,000 by 1873, and peaked at 9,787 in 1899. William McIntyre, secretary during the 1890s, was strongly opposed to a merger with the ASC&J or the General Union of Carpenters and Joiners (GUC&J), but his successor, Alexander Stark, tried to arrange a merger of all three unions in order to counteract falling membership. With membership down to just 3,964 in 1910, a successful merger with the ASC&J was finally completed the following year.

== General Secretaries ==
1862: George Ross
1865: William Matson
1868: William Paterson
1883: James Beveridge
1892: William McIntyre
1903: Alexander Stark
