= Glasgow Trades Council =

Glasgow Trades Council is an association of trade union branches in Glasgow in Scotland.

The trades council was founded in 1858 as the Glasgow United Trades Council. Future MP Alexander MacDonald of the miners played an important role, but did not hold any prominent post, and was able to attend only as an honorary member of the Flint Glass Makers' Sick and Friendly Society.

As the trades council of a major industrial city, it began playing a national role, and in 1864 it hosted an early meeting of trade unions from across the UK. By this point, about two-thirds of the trade unions in the city had affiliated, with the important Lanarkshire Miners' County Union following in the 1870s. The council also helped set up unions in areas where there was no appropriate body, organising unions for sailors, carters, and most importantly what became the National Union of Dock Labourers.

In 1884 the council ran four candidates for Glasgow Town Council, without success. However, another attempt in 1888 led to the election of H. Tait, followed a year later by James Millar Jack, and in 1890 by A. J. Hunter and John Battersby. This experience led the council to support Keir Hardie's candidature at the Mid Lanarkshire by-election, 1888; it supported but did not affiliate to Hardie's Scottish Labour Party, and played a central role in establishing the Scottish United Trades Councils Labour Party. Both labour parties stood candidates in the city at the 1892 general election.

The council played a key role in the creation of the Scottish Trades Union Congress (STUC) in 1897, and held national meetings which established organisations including the National Labour Housing Council, the National Committee of Organised Labour for Promoting Old Age Pensions for All, and the Scottish section of the Workers' Educational Association. It also undertook local campaigns, such as for the municipalisation of the trams.

In 1904, the council shortened its name to "Glasgow Trades Council", but it soon became the "Glasgow Trades and Labour Council", also representing the local Labour Party, and its secretary served the two bodies jointly until 1942. This led to suspicion of the body on Red Clydeside, and the Clyde Workers' Committee did not engage with the council. However, following World War I, the Communist Party of Great Britain became strong on the council, which affiliated to the National Minority Movement, leading some trade unions to withdraw.

In 1951, the council refused to obey an STUC order not to support CPGB-led peace campaign. In response, the STUC ordered the council to dissolve. Eventually, a compromise was found, with the council reforming as the Glasgow District Trades Council, with new staff and premises.

== Secretaries ==
1858: Matthew Lawrence
1863: George Newton
1867:
1870s: John Lang
1870s: Duncan Kennedy
1880s: Archibald Jeffrey Hunter
1902: George Carson
1916: William Shaw
1937: Arthur Brady
1942: George Middleton
1949: John C. Hill
1953: John Johnston
1964: Hugh Wyper
1970: John Reidford
1980s: Jane McKay
2010s-2025: Tricia Donnelly
2025: Coll McCail

== See also ==
- Scottish Trades Union Congress
