= Edinburgh Trade Union Council =

The Edinburgh Trade Union Council brings together trade union branches in Edinburgh in Scotland.

The first permanent trades council in Edinburgh appears to have been formed in 1853, one of the first in the UK. However, the earliest records of the current council date to 1859, founded as the Edinburgh Trades Council, and it is to this date that a continuous existence can be proved.

The Scottish Land and Labour League, founded in 1884, started working closely with the trades council during the Broxburn miners' strike of 1887, and the following year the two bodies co-sponsored the first Scottish Socialist Societies conference, with the Social Democratic Federation and Edinburgh Christian Socialists; this led to the formation of the Scottish Socialist Federation (SSF). In 1893, the council co-organised a demonstration in support of the eight-hour working day with the SSF and Independent Labour Party (ILP). It remained close to the ILP, and in 1927 put up funds in order that its regional publication, the Labour Standard, could continue, although it only survived three more years.

The council also helped organise unions in industries where there was no body in place; for example, in 1889, it organised a local branch of the National Union of Dock Labourers. Into the 20th-century, it helped resolve disputes between unions, and in 1918 brokered an agreement between them on the organisation of women workers.

The Communist Party of Great Britain (CPGB) was influential in the council from the 1920s, but it never held a majority, and the council repeatedly voted down proposals to affiliate to the CPGB. In 1928, the trades council supported a CPGB-organised hunger march, despite the initial opposition of its officials. However, by the following year, the council had expelled all CPGB members and supporters. During the 1950s, the council supported the Edinburgh People's Festival against claims it was a CPGB front.

By the 1950s, the council had been renamed the Edinburgh and District Trades Council, and in 1993 it took its current name.
