= Scottish Trades Union Congress =

Scottish trade union federation

STUC
- Scottish Trades Union Congress
- Founded: 25–27 March 1897
- Headquarters: Glasgow, Scotland
- Location: Scotland
- Members: 550,000
- Key people: Rozanne Foyer, General Secretary; Richard Hardy, President
- Website: www.stuc.org.uk

The Scottish Trades Union Congress (STUC) is the national trade union centre in Scotland. With 40 affiliated unions as of 2026, the STUC represents over 550,000 trade unionists.

The STUC is a separate organisation from the English and Welsh Trades Union Congress (TUC), having been established in 1897 as a result of a political dispute with the TUC regarding political representation for the Labour movement.

The current General Secretary of the Scottish Trades Union Congress is Rozanne Foyer.

== Administrative history ==
The Scottish Trades Union Congress (STUC) is a completely independent and autonomous trade union centre for Scotland. It is not a Scottish regional organisation of the Trades Union Congress (TUC). It was established in 1897 largely as a result of a political dispute with the TUC regarding political representation for the Labour movement. A number of meetings were held by the various Scottish trades councils to discuss the situation, resulting in the formation of the STUC in Glasgow, Scotland, in March 1897. From the outset, the STUC was not in competition with the TUC, nor was it a political movement, but sought to ensure that "in any scheme for the government of Scotland provision should be made for the same industrial legislation being applied throughout Great Britain." Close contact was retained with the TUC with reciprocal arrangements existing for mutual assistance and co-operation when the occasion warranted.

The STUC originally had a rented office at 58 Renfield Street, Glasgow, Scotland, in a building belonging to the Scottish Council for Women's Trades. Between 1900 and 1949 the STUC had offices in various locations in Glasgow city centre and the Govanhill area of Glasgow before moving to Woodlands Terrace in the west end of the city in 1949. In 1998, the offices moved to Woodlands Road.

The Annual Congress is the Governing Body of the STUC. From the earliest days, the Congress concerned itself with a wide range of economic and social questions, lobbying British Members of Parliament, and from 1999 the Scottish Parliament and executive, on major issues. Hours and conditions of work and the battles around these issues were always a central preoccupation of the Congress, but it also concerned itself with wider issues such as international affairs, housing, education, transport, peace, racism, and social and economic issues, as well as promoting and supporting joint trades union councils (later renamed trade union councils).

The struggle for independent working class political representation was one of the concerns on which the Congress was founded and in 1900, the Congress was instrumental in establishing the Scottish Workers' Parliamentary Election Committee, a forerunner of the Scottish Council of the Labour Party, which would nominate and support candidates for Parliamentary elections. The Congress was also involved with the Scottish Workers' Representation Committee which continued to function until 1909 when its duties were taken over by the national Labour Party. A Scottish Council of the Labour Party was formed in 1915. Despite this involvement in the process which established the Labour Party, the STUC is not, and has never been, affiliated to any political party.

The STUC has always had active women members. In 1897 a female delegate, Margaret Irwin, obtained the highest vote in the election of the first Parliamentary Committee (later renamed the General Council), the governing body of the Congress. She was nominated for chairman but declined nomination on the grounds that to appoint a woman chairman at that time was too premature. However, she acted as the Parliamentary Secretary and was also Secretary of the Scottish Council for Women's Trade. The first female President, Bell Jobson, presided at the 1937 Congress. In 1926, the Organisation of Women Committee (later the Women's Advisory Committee, now the Women’s Committee) was established by the Congress, specialising in issues relating particularly to women.

In 1937 the Congress agreed a motion to establish youth fellowships as a way of attracting young people to join the unions, and therefore encourage union membership regardless of sex or age. It was realised that to create separate youth fellowships was restrictive, suggesting that the old and young should work separately. Therefore, in 1938, it was decided to establish the Trade Union Youth Advisory Committee (now called the Youth Committee) encouraging youth sections within the existing unions. The Committee is elected by an annual conference of young trade unionists that deals with youth related issues, and elects a delegation to the Annual Congress which submits three motions and amendments like other affiliates. It also organises day and weekend schools and other activities for young trade unionists.

From the 1930s onwards, probably the most important concern of the Congress has been the Scottish economy. The STUC has played its part in the legend of Red Clydeside 1910-1922; the period of militancy and protest by the working people of Glasgow and elsewhere. It has played a role in many historic struggles of the Scottish people including the General Strike of 1926, the post-war reconstruction of Scottish industry, and more recent events like the Upper Clyde Shipbuilders work-in of 1971–1972, the 1984–1985 miners' strike and the defeat of the poll tax in the early 1990s. The Congress was instrumental in bringing the motor industry to Bathgate and Linwood, Scotland, in the 1960s the STUC played a central role for many decades in the campaign which established the Scottish Parliament.

By 1947 the STUC consisted of 83 affiliated trades unions with a membership of 671,630. In addition, 51 trades councils were affiliated. Membership was made up of members of the Scottish unions and Scottish members of unions covering the British Isles. The period 1977 to 1980 saw membership of the STUC peak to over one million with 80 affiliated unions and 45 trades union councils. A gradual decline of membership then occurred to a total of 634,797 in 2001 with 46 affiliated unions and 33 trades union councils. In 2013, the STUC represented over 630,000 trade unionists, the members of 37 affiliated trade unions and 20 Trades Union Councils.

The focal point of the STUC is its Annual Congress held in April and attended by delegates from affiliated organisations. It is the Annual Congress which sets down the policy of the STUC and which elects the General Council (known as the Parliamentary Committee until 1923). Between Congresses, it is the General Council which implements policy. The affiliates are divided into seven sections: transport, mining and distribution; steel, engineering and electrical; manufacturing; municipal, general and building; financial, scientific and technical services; civil and public services; education and cultural services; and trades union councils. Each of these sections is represented on the General Council (with a number of places in each section reserved for representatives of women workers), approximately on the basis of its proportion of the total STUC membership. There are also two places on the General Council for representatives of black workers, and two places for representatives of young (under the age of 26) workers. Whilst the General Council is elected by the whole of Congress, candidates are restricted to standing for election to the section to which their organisation belongs.

In 2020, the STUC moved to temporary accommodation in Rutherglen before its planned move to a new build premises in Landressy Street, Bridgeton, Glasgow in early 2021.

== STUC affiliate unions ==
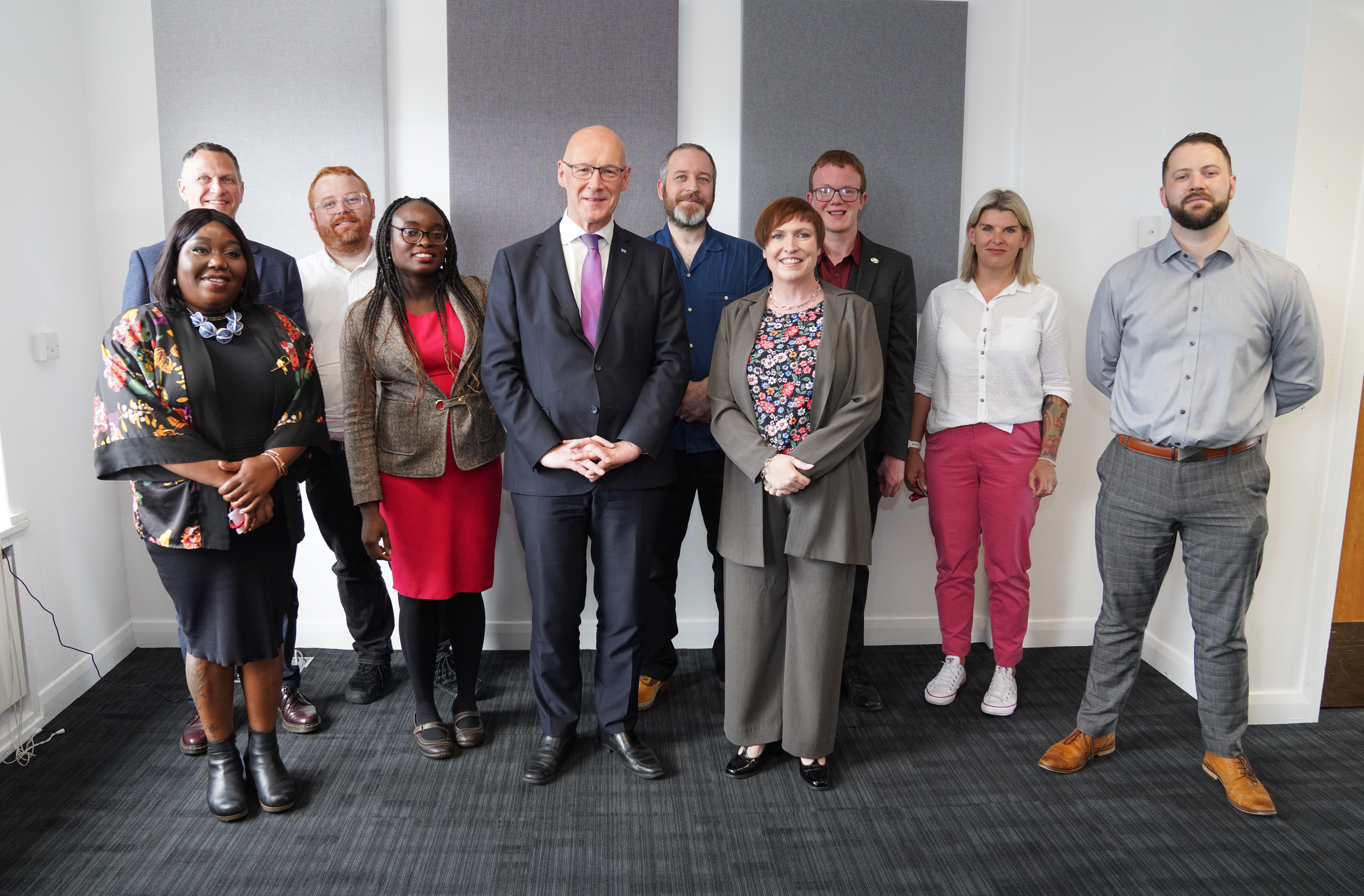
STUC meeting 2024 with Roz Foyer and the First Minister of Scotland recognising leading reps

The following unions were affiliated to the STUC as of July 2020:

- Accord
- Associated Society of Locomotive Engineers and Firemen (ASLEF)
- Association of Educational Psychologists (AEP)
- Bakers, Food and Allied Workers' Union (BFAWU)
- British Airline Pilots' Association (BALPA)
- British Dietetic Association (BDA)
- British Orthoptic Society (BOS)
- Chartered Society of Physiotherapy (CSP)
- Communication Workers Union (CWU)
- Community
- Educational Institute of Scotland (EIS)
- Equity
- FDA
- Fire Brigades Union (FBU)
- GMB
- Hospital Consultants and Specialists Association (HCSA)
- Musicians' Union (MU)
- National Association of Racing Staff [NAORS]
- National Association of Schoolmasters Union of Women Teachers (NASUWT)
- National Union of Journalists (NUJ)
- National Union of Mineworkers (NUM)
- National Union of Rail, Maritime and Transport Workers (RMT)
- Nautilus UK
- Prison Officers Association (Scotland)
- Prospect
- Public and Commercial Services Union (PCS)
- Royal College of Midwives (RCM)
- Scottish Artists Union (SAU)
- Scottish Secondary Teachers' Association (SSTA)
- Scottish Society of Playwrights
- Society of Chiropodists and Podiatrists (SCP)
- Society of Radiographers (SoR)
- Transport Salaried Staffs' Association (TSSA)
- Union of Shop, Distributive and Allied Workers (USDAW)
- UNISON
- Unite
- United Road Transport Union (URTU)
- University and College Union (UCU)

== Projects ==
- Scottish Union Learning

== See also ==
- List of trade unions
- List of federations of trade unions
- Scottish Socialist Party
- SNP Trade Union Group
- Trades Union Congress
- Wales TUC
- Irish Congress of Trade Unions
- European Trade Union Confederation

== Bibliography ==
- The Bairns o' Adam - The Story of the STUC, by Keith Aitken, 1997
