= Mary Docherty =

20th-century Scottish activist

- Born: 27 April 1908; Cowdenbeath, Scotland
- Died: 2 February 2000 (aged 91); Auchtertool, Scotland
- Occupations: Dairy worker, dentist's assistant, domestic servant
- Known for: Communist activism
- Notable work: A Miner's Lass, 'Auld Bob', a Man in a Million

Mary Docherty (27 April 1908 – 2 February 2000) was a British activist and member of the Communist Party of Great Britain. Born to a working-class family in Cowdenbeath, Scotland, she was influenced by the communist beliefs of her father, a miner, as well as by the poverty she grew up in. She joined the Communist Party at the age of 18, and in 1929 traveled to the Soviet Union as a Scottish delegate to a gathering of young communists. She founded a local children's wing of the Communist Party, carried out a successful agitation to declare 1 May a school holiday, and worked for communist Member of Parliament Willie Gallacher. She retired from active politics at the age of 60, but continued to give talks and write her memoirs, published in 1991 as A Miner's Lass.

== Early life and family ==
Mary Docherty was born on 27 April 1908 in the town of Cowdenbeath. Her parents were Janet Todd, who worked in a theatre, and William Docherty, a miner. She was the second of three daughters. Her father had lost his job due to his political work with the Communist Party, and as a result was forced to sell firewood to support the family. Due to the family's financial circumstances, they were often forced to subsist on cheap local herring, including when Mary's mother was pregnant with Mary. Docherty's small size as a baby was attributed to this restricted diet.

The county of Fife, of which Cowdenbeath was a burgh, was a stronghold of the Communist Party; Docherty later stated that "Fife was just as radical" as Clydeside, and that the local party had been asked to "slow down" by the party headquarters in London. Docherty's father was a member of the Fife Communist Anarchist Group, and later a founding member of the Communist Party. She was influenced by her father's political activism, as well as by the poverty and hunger that her family endured. Her father wrote political plays, in which Docherty would perform as a child. She contracted tuberculosis at the age of four, due partly to the malnutrition her mother had experienced. She later said that the strike of 1921, during which the British army was brought in to Cowdenbeath to support the local police, was very influential on her. She was 13 years old at the time.

As a child, she attended a Socialist Sunday School which taught politics, science, and geography. She later switched to the Proletarian Sunday School, which had a similar ideology, and encouraged children to discuss politics. Her academic record at school was good, and she passed an exam allowing her to enroll in "Higher Grade", but she dropped out of school in 1922. Docherty remained single throughout her life, but played a maternal role in the life of her adopted younger sister Frances. She also took care of her mother until the latter died at the age of 100.

== Communist activism ==
Docherty's father joined the Fife Communist Anarchist Group, and was also a founding member of the Communist Party in Britain. Docherty herself joined the Communist Party at the age of 18, the youngest age at which she was able to do so, soon after the 1926 United Kingdom general strike. She initially became a member of the Young Communist League, or YCL. During the strike, she was involved in the "Local Councils of Action", which were inspired by the Russian Soviets, and helped coordinate the strike. The miners' defeat in the strike was very influential upon her. The Communist Party provided her with an adult education, during which she was one of two women among 48 men. The other woman in her class was her mother. While still a teenager, she became the literature secretary for the Cowdenbeath branch of the party, and was responsible for the production and sale of a number of weekly newspapers.

While Docherty was still in her twenties, she organized a children's wing of the party in Cowdenbeath, known as the "Young Pioneers". During propaganda meetings of the children's wing, she taught songs, poetry, and plays, and in 1928 organised an agitation to obtain a holiday for all schoolchildren on 1 May, or Labour Day, which was successful in five different burghs, including Cowdenbeath. She also organized a campaign against corporal punishment, and for free food for children while they were at school. The use of the strap to punish children was eventually prohibited after the communists were elected to the Fife education authority and the town council in Lochgelly.

Her affiliation with the party allowed her to travel to the Soviet Union in 1929 as a Scottish delegate to a gathering of young communists. In the same year she had tried to join the National Unemployed Workers' Movement, but was told that women were not allowed to be members. Docherty had a great love for the Soviet Union, despite what she saw as a political breakdown in that country. Vladimir Lenin was an idol of hers. During her time in Russia she spent three months in a sanatorium near the Black Sea, recovering from tuberculosis. She had had an operation on a tumor related to the disease before she left Fife, but was cured completely at the sanatorium. She also visited a motor vehicle factory, and found it impressive, because "it [wasn't] for their sel', it was for everybody because everything belonged to them". During her time in Moscow, she learned Russian, visited the Bolshoi, and took part in a parade on the 12th anniversary of the Russian Revolution. Of her time in the Soviet Union, she stated:

I felt a different person, no worry about where the next meal was coming from, free to go where I pleased, everyone doing everything they could to make me happy. When I was in Moscow I would look around and say to myself 'All this belongs to the workers. No capitalist class'.

In 1937, she volunteered to fight in the Spanish Civil War with the International Brigade; however, she was turned down, because she did not have medical experience. She took to fundraising for the Republican forces in the war, participating in the "Aid Spain" campaign. She became the treasurer of a women's group which raised funds for the wives of men who had gone to fight in the civil war.

Docherty remained a member of the Communist Party for 70 years, at times working with Alex Moffat and Abe Moffat. She campaigned for Jack Leckie when he was a candidate for the Dunfermline Burghs constituency. She worked for Willie Gallacher, the communist Member of Parliament for Fife, for several years, and in 1952 unsuccessfully ran for a city council seat. At various points, Docherty held the positions of treasurer, Women's Group leader, and secretary for the Fife branch of the Communist Party. She retired from active political life when she was 60 years old, but despite being crippled by arthritis, participated in fundraising efforts for the newspaper Morning Star. She lived in a modest house in Cowdenbeath, and spent her time working on her memoirs. She continued to give talks and participate in International Women's Day events nearly every year until her death on 2 February 2000.

== Employment ==
Docherty found work as a domestic servant at the age of 14, before moving on to working in a factory. She tried to find a job after returning from Russia, but her travel there meant that people were unwilling to employ her. Thus she sold firewood along with her father for a while. She eventually found work at the Leith Hospital as a cleaner, because that job did not require references. She then worked as a servant for five years, before leaving to attend to her mother, who was ill. Back in Fife, she worked as an assistant to a dentist. She stated later in life that when she attended rallies with the communist party, she had to lie to her employers about where she went. When the Second World War broke out in 1939, she began working in the Crombie munitions factory, before shifting to looking after children in Rosyth. The final job she held was at a cooperative bakery. She continued her work for the Communist Party while holding all of these positions.

== Notable works ==
In 1991, she published A Miner's Lass, an autobiographical book about the poverty and lack of opportunity among working-class women in her generation. The book describes her experiences as a young communist woman in Fife, including the impact of the Russian revolution in 1917, and does not describe the ideology of the party in great detail. It is dedicated to her father, demonstrating the importance of his influence on her identity, and is unusual in being one of the few autobiographies of a working-class woman. In 1996, she published 'Auld Bob', a Man in a Million, a tribute to activist Bob Selkirk, who had been her mentor. When she was 91 years old she was among the speakers at an event called "Red Fife", about the contribution of Fife to the communist movement.

== Sources ==
- Annetts; Jason; Law; Alex; McNeish; Wallace; Mooney; Gerry (2014). "Forms of Protest". Understanding social welfare movements. Policy Press. ISBN 9781447319818.
- Braid, Mary (14 August 1992). "No pie for the miner's daughter: Mary Braid hears how the coalfields of Fife glowed red with political fervour". The Independent.
- Galloway, Susan (17 February 2000). "Mary Docherty, Communist activist and author". The Scotsman.
- "Mary Docherty". Herald Scotland. 15 February 2000.
- Ewan, Elizabeth L.; Innes, Sue; Reynolds, Sian; et al., eds. (2006). The Biographical Dictionary of Scottish Women. Edinburgh: Edinburgh University Press. pp. 96–97. ISBN 9780748626601.
- Harrower-Gray, Annie (2014). Scotland's Hidden Harlots and Heroines: Women's Role in Scottish Society from 1690–1969. Pen and Sword. ISBN 9781473834705.
- Jackson, Angela (2003). British Women and the Spanish Civil War. Routledge. ISBN 9781134471072.
- Rafeek, Neil C. (2008). Communist Women in Scotland: Red Clydeside from the Russian Revolution to the End of the Soviet Union. I.B.Tauris. ISBN 9780857711540.
- "Mary Docherty", Journal of Scottish Historical Studies, vol. 24, Edinburgh University Press, 2005
- Worley, Matthew (2002). Class Against Class: The Communist Party in Britain Between the Wars. I. B. Tauris. ISBN 9781860647475.
