= Robert Small (trade unionist) =

Scottish trade unionist and political activist

Robert Mathieson Small (14 April 1873 – 26 September 1918) was a Scottish trade unionist and political activist.

Small was born in Glasgow, the second son of William Small, who became the secretary of the Lanarkshire Miners' County Union (LCMU), and Janet "Jessie" Bell Scott. Robert was the younger brother of William B. Small and older brother of Lothian Small. Robert followed his father and William B. by becoming an agent of the LCMU; in his case, covering the Harthill area.

The LCMU was part of the Scottish Miners' Federation (SMF), so when the Amalgamated Miners and Manual Workers Union (AMMW) in West Lothian left the SMF, Small was sent to the area to attempt to found a rival union. He tried to persuade leading activist James Doonan to join the new endeavour, but Doonan refused, and eventually the AMMW rejoined the SMF. Although not a success, this did lead to him spending a period as secretary of the small Scottish Shale Miners and Manual Workers' Union.

Small's father had been a founder member of the Independent Labour Party (ILP), and Small joined in 1907, soon becoming its Scottish secretary. The ILP was affiliated to the Labour Party and, as a result, Small stood for Labour in North West Lanarkshire at the January 1910 general election, but took only 9.7% of the vote and third place. Soon after, he joined the more radical Social Democratic Federation (SDF), for whom he stood for Lanarkshire County Council later in the year, but again missed out on election. The SDF later became the British Socialist Party, which considered putting Small forward as a candidate in the 1913 Linlithgowshire by-election, although it ultimately did not do so. Small appears to have remained a member of the ILP and on good terms with its leaders during this period.

Small took a variety of full-time trade union posts, including Scottish Organiser of the General Federation of Trade Unions, and Glasgow and Clyde Organiser of the Workers' Union. He also became the first Glasgow secretary of the Workers' Educational Association.

He died in London in 1918.
