= John Weir (trade unionist) =

Scottish trade unionist

John Weir (1851–1908) was a Scottish trade unionist.

Born in Parkneuk, Weir began working at a local colliery from the age of eleven. He became an active trade unionist, joining the Fife and Kinross Miners' Association (FKMA), and working for it full-time as its acting president from 1878. He became full-time president in 1880, then in 1881, he was elected as the FKMA's general secretary and agent, serving until his death in 1908. He was centrally involved in the creation of the Scottish Miners' Federation, serving as its first treasurer, again holding the post until his death. He was also involved with the Trades Union Congress, and was elected as its delegate to the American Federation of Labour in 1900.

Weir was a Liberal-Labour politician, and served on Dunfermline Burgh Council. He was considered as a potential candidate for the UK Parliament seat of West Fife on several occasions: at the 1889 West Fife by-election, when the local Liberal Association instead selected Augustine Birrell; at the 1900 general election, when he decided against putting his name forward as the union was divided on its merits; and finally in 1907, when the Scottish Miners' agreed they would sponsor his candidature at the next general election through the Scottish Workers' Representation Committee, but this did not occur as he died before it took place.

Weir's brother, James Galloway Weir, was well known as a campaigner for Scottish Home Rule and for crofters' rights, who became a Liberal Member of Parliament.

Trade union offices
Preceded by Henry Cook	General Secretary of the Fife and Kinross Miners' Association; 1881–1908	Succeeded by William Adamson
Preceded by New position	Treasurer of the Scottish Miners' Federation; 1894–1908	Succeeded by John Robertson
Preceded by James Haslam and Alexander Wilkie	Trades Union Congress representative to the American Federation of Labour; 1900; With: Pete Curran	Succeeded by Francis Chandler and Ben Tillett
