= David Gilmour (trade unionist) =

Scottish trade unionist

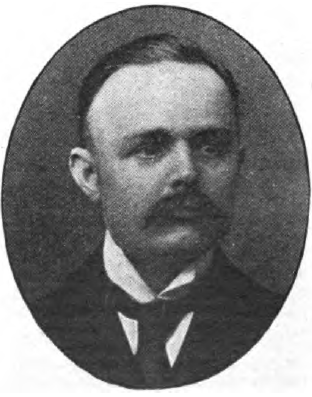
David Gilmour, around 1905

David R. Gilmour (1861 – September 1926) was a Scottish trade unionist.

Born at Joppa in Ayrshire, Gilmour worked there as a coal miner before moving to Hamilton in Lanarkshire to find new employment in the industry. He found work at the Old Eddlewood Colliery, where he was soon elected as checkweighman and was a leading founder member of the Lanarkshire Miners' County Union (LMCU). He remained involved with union while transferring to work at nearby Bent Colliery, then, when the LMCU decided to appoint a full-time secretary, he was elected to the post, serving for more than twenty years. He also served on the executive of the Scottish Miners' Federation for much of the period.

Gilmour was active in the wider labour movement, and stood unsuccessfully for the Scottish Workers Representation Committee at the 1906 general election in Falkirk Burghs. However, the following year, he was elected to Hamilton Burgh Council, serving in later years for the Labour Party. In 1912, he served on the Royal Commission on Housing. He served on the political committee of the Scottish Trades Union Congress, and was its president in 1916.

Gilmour was a supporter of British involvement in World War I, and served as the labour advisor to the Ministry of National Service, an issue which was divisive among members of his union. In 1917, a referendum among members of his union required him to resign this position, but he was soon voted out of his union and subsequently broke all his links with the LMCU. He also left the Labour Party, and stood at the 1918 general election in Hamilton for the rival National Democratic and Labour Party, taking third place with 25.9% of the vote.

After the war, Gilmour was made an Officer of the Order of the British Empire. By 1926, he was retired and in poor health but, shortly before his death, he wrote a series of articles arguing against the UK miners' strike.

Trade union offices
Preceded by William Abraham and James Wignall	Trades Union Congress representative to the American Federation of Labour; 1905; With: William Mosses	Succeeded by Joseph Nicholas Bell and Allan Gee
Preceded by Robert Climie	President of the Scottish Trades Union Congress; 1916	Succeeded by Robert Allan
Preceded by William Small	Secretary of the Lanarkshire Miners' County Union; 1896–1918	Succeeded by Duncan Macgregor Graham
