= David Proudfoot (trade unionist) =

Scottish trade unionist

David Proudfoot (8 December 1892 – 16 January 1958) was a Scottish trade unionist.

Born at Methil in Fife, Proudfoot left school at the age of fourteen to undertake an engineering apprenticeship, but after three years he left to work as a coal miner at the Klondyke Colliery. During World War I, he served as a machine gunner with the Royal Scots Fusiliers, rising to the rank of a non-commissioned officer, but was invalided out with malaria in 1918. Radicalised by the war, he joined the British Socialist Party (BSP), and returned to work in the mines. However, his malaria returned regularly, and so he worked above ground, being elected as checkweighman at the Wellesley Colliery in 1919.

The BSP became part of the Communist Party of Great Britain (CPGB) in 1920, and Proudfoot was a founder member. He devoted large amounts of his time to the Fife, Kinross and Clackmannan Miners' Association, but in 1922 was elected as vice-chairman of the left-wing breakaway, the Mineworkers' Reform Union of Fife, Kinross and Clackmannan. The CPGB decided to oppose the split and, although Proudfoot remained prominent in the Reform Union, he agitated for it to reunite with the Miners' Association.

Proudfoot was a leading figure in Fife during the 1926 UK general strike. When the strike was defeated, he was charged with sedition; he was found not proven of the charge, but lost his job. The two Fife miners unions voted to reunify, and Proudfoot won election as a full-time miners' agent, alongside his comrade John McArthur - this despite union leader William Adamson calling three successive ballots in the hope of obtaining a different result. Proudfoot was also elected to the executive of the National Union of Scottish Mineworkers (NUSMW).

Frustrated with inactivity at the NUSMW, and encouraged by the Third Period policy of the CPGB to form separate unions, Proudfoot was a founder of the new, communist-led United Mineworkers of Scotland (UMS) and worked as full-time organiser for its Fife affiliate. In February 1931, he was elected as general secretary of the UMS, but he became dissatisfied on discovering that previous secretary William Allan had left the union's administration in a poor state. When, later in the year, he was not paid, he resigned, to be replaced by Abe Moffat. He also left the CPGB.

After his resignation, Proudfoot worked as a labourer in various fields, before becoming an insurance agent. He retained his communist beliefs, but did not rejoin the CPGB, and eventually decided to instead become a member of the Labour Party. He served as a Labour member of Methil and Buckhaven Town Council from 1945 until 1951, and also served a term on Fife County Council. He retired from work and his political posts early in the 1950s as his health declined, and spent the last five years of his life unable to leave his bed, due to pneumoconiosis. McArthur raised funds to help support Proudfoot's family during this period.

Trade union offices
Preceded by William Allan	General Secretary of the United Mineworkers of Scotland; February – September 1931	Succeeded by Abe Moffat
