= Alex Moffat (trade unionist) =

Scottish trade unionist and communist activist (1904–1967)

Alexander B. Moffat (1904 – 6 September 1967) was a Scottish trade unionist and communist activist who was President of the Scottish Trades Union Congress and the Scottish Mineworkers Union.

== Early life ==
Born into a Plymouth Brethren family in Lumphinnans in Fife, Moffat left school at the age of fourteen to work at the local coal mine. His family had a long association with the trade union movement; his grandfather, David Moffat, had been the secretary of the Mid and East Lothian Miners' Association, until victimisation by employers forced him to move his family to Lumphinnans to find work. Moffat was elected as pit delegate after only four years at the mine, the youngest ever pit delegate in Scotland.

== 1920s and 1930s ==
He worked with his brothers, David and Abe Moffat, in support of the national miners' strike of 1926. He was imprisoned for two months for a speech he made during the strike, and was thereafter blacklisted by local mines. He married Alice Brady, who he had met through the Young Communist League. She died during the birth of what would have been their first child, in 1928.

Thereafter, Moffat devoted much of his time to the Communist Party of Great Britain (CPGB), and in 1928 was elected to Fife County Council, replacing fellow party member Bruce Wallace. That year, he was also elected as a checkweighman, alongside his brother Abe, but the two were removed from their positions amid a dispute about their role in a dispute over payment systems. In 1928, he was also elected as Vice-President of the Fife, Kinross and Clackmannan Miners Association, and organised the Fife Miners' Gala, although the union was soon dissolved and Moffat instead became vice-president of the communist-led United Mineworkers of Scotland, and Fife organiser for the CPGB. He stood in Rutherglen at the 1929 general election, gaining 842 votes, and was not elected.

David and Alex Moffat, born seven years apart, were more than just brothers. They were brothers-in-arms, and usually biographies tend to combine them. Being born in Lumphinnans – one of several pit towns dominated at the time by the Communist Party and even called "Little Moscow" by some – they were almost destined to be mine unionists and communists. Their family had a long tradition of involvement in mining trade unionism; their grandfather had been a pioneer of the trade union in the Lothians in the 1860s, but was forced to move to Fife due to victimisation.

Working in the pits for 16 years, Abe Moffat was victimised perennially. He actively supported miners' strike actions. After joining the Communist Party in 1922, he helped publish the `Buzzer', a newsletter for militant miners at Glencraig Colliery, Lochgelly. He joined the party and was elected as a Communist councillor to Ballingry Parish Council.

== World War II and after ==
During World War II, Moffat served as a sergeant in the Royal Corps of Signals, remaining a councillor but attending meetings during periods of leave. After the war, he became active in the National Union of Scottish Mine Workers, of which his brother Abe was president. He resigned from the CPGB following the Soviet invasion of Hungary in 1956, but later rejoined the party. Of that resignation, he said "I have been a close friend of the Soviet Union for more than thirty years and have no desire to become anti-Soviet now. I am, however, opposed to the prospect of a third world war, and will oppose actions or incidents that are likely to lead to this, whether from the East or the West."

He and his brother, Abe Moffat, were central to the miners' struggle for economic rights. "The name Moffat was to become legend throughout the Fife, then Scottish, and ultimately the British mining industry. The Moffat brothers were reported to be in the thick of every struggle to defend and improve the conditions of the miners and their families."

In 1953, he was the organizer of the Scottish Miners Gala Day in Edinburgh, sponsored by the National Union of Mineworkers. The festival, among other things, protested government labour policy. It included the presence of the Scottish Miners Youth contingent, a rally and procession, a pipe band and competitions. This was the subject of a film directed by P. James Dickson that is in the Scottish archives.

In 1959 he and John Wood testified concerning the 18 September, Auchengeich Colliery Disaster, Lanarkshire that had a death toll of 47.

In 1957, Moffat was elected as vice-president of the union. He was the mineworkers' representative on the general council of the Scottish Trades Union Congress, and served as its president in 1959. He was the CPGB's candidate for the presidency of the National Union of Mineworkers in 1960, and led the voting until the final round, when he was narrowly beaten by Sidney Ford. He succeeded Abe as president of the Scottish Mine Workers in 1961, beating future Member of Parliament Alex Eadie in the election. He died, still in office, six years later.

== Sources ==
- Linehan, Thomas (2007). Communism in Britain, 1920–39: From the Cradle to the Grave. Manchester New York New York: Manchester University Press. ISBN 978-0-7190-7141-6.
- Moffat, Abe (1965). My life with the miners. Lawrence & Wishart. p. 297. ASIN B0000CMFR1.
- Tuckett, Angela (1986). The Scottish Trades Union Congress: the first 80 years, 1897–1977 (1st ed.). City: Mainstream Publishing in conjunction with the Scottish Trades Union Congress. p. 429. ISBN 978-1851580231.

Trade union offices
Preceded by William Mowbray	President of the Scottish Trades Union Congress; 1959	Succeeded by Jimmy Milne
Preceded by Abe Moffat	President of the National Union of Scottish Mine Workers; 1961–1967	Succeeded by Mick McGahey
