= Willie Small =

Willie Small may refer to:

- recording pseudonym of Steve Lawrence
- William Small (Scottish politician)
- William Small (disambiguation)
