= William Adamson =

Trade unionist and politician

The Right Honourable William Adamson
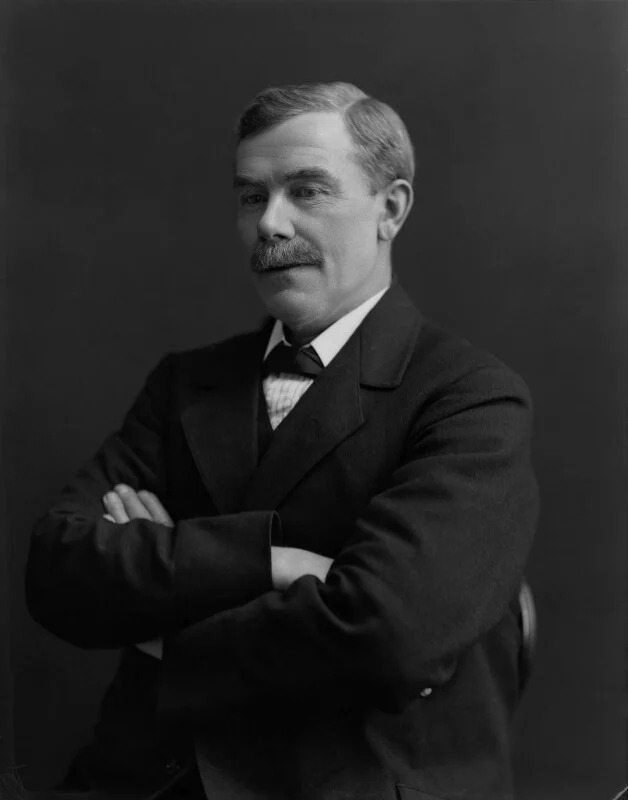
- Adamson in 1918

Leader of the Labour Party
- In office 24 October 1917 – 14 February 1921
- Chief Whip: George Henry Roberts; William Tyson Wilson; Arthur Henderson
- Preceded by: Arthur Henderson
- Succeeded by: J. R. Clynes

Secretary of State for Scotland
- In office 7 June 1929 – 24 August 1931
- Prime Minister: Ramsay MacDonald
- Preceded by: Sir John Gilmour
- Succeeded by: Archibald Sinclair
- In office 22 January 1924 – 3 November 1924
- Prime Minister: Ramsay MacDonald
- Preceded by: Ronald Munro Ferguson
- Succeeded by: Sir John Gilmour

Member of Parliament for West Fife
- In office 19 December 1910 – 8 October 1931
- Preceded by: John Deans Hope
- Succeeded by: Charles Milne

Personal details
- Born: 2 April 1863 Dunfermline, Fife, Scotland
- Died: 23 February 1936 (aged 72)
- Party: Labour

William Adamson (2 April 1863 – 23 February 1936) was a Scottish trade unionist and Labour Party politician. He was Leader of the Labour Party from 1917 to 1921 and was Secretary of State for Scotland in 1924 and during 1929–1931 in the first two Labour ministries headed by Ramsay MacDonald.

== Background ==
Adamson was born in Dunfermline, Fife, and was educated at a local dame school. He worked as a miner in Fife where he became involved with the National Union of Mineworkers. In 1902–08 he was Assistant Secretary of the Fife and Kinross Miners' Association, and he thereafter served as its General Secretary.

== Political career ==
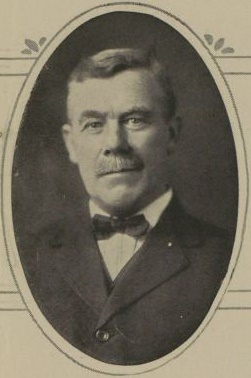
Adamson in 1920

Active with the new Labour Party, Adamson was first elected to Parliament for West Fife in the December 1910 general election. His victory was the only Labour gain from the Liberals in that election.

Adamson was elected Chairman of the Parliamentary Labour Party on 24 October 1917, a post he held until 1921. He led the party into the general election of 1918, which saw Labour gain 15 seats and become the largest opposition party in the House of Commons for the first time; however, there remained uncertainty as to whether Adamson or the leader of the independent Liberals, Donald Maclean could claim to be the true leader of the opposition in the Commons.

In 1918 he was sworn into the Privy Council. In 1919, Adamson was confident that the experience of the First World War would "produce a different atmosphere and an entirely different relationship amongst all sections of our people" and would act as a watershed in the process of social reform. He served as Secretary for Scotland and Secretary of State for Scotland in 1924 and between 1929 and 1931 in the Labour governments of Ramsay MacDonald.

However, he split with MacDonald after the formation of the National Government. Adamson lost his seat in the 1931 election which he contested for Labour against MacDonald's coalition. He stood again in the 1935 election but again failed to take the seat, losing on this occasion to William Gallacher of the Communist Party of Great Britain.

== Personal life ==
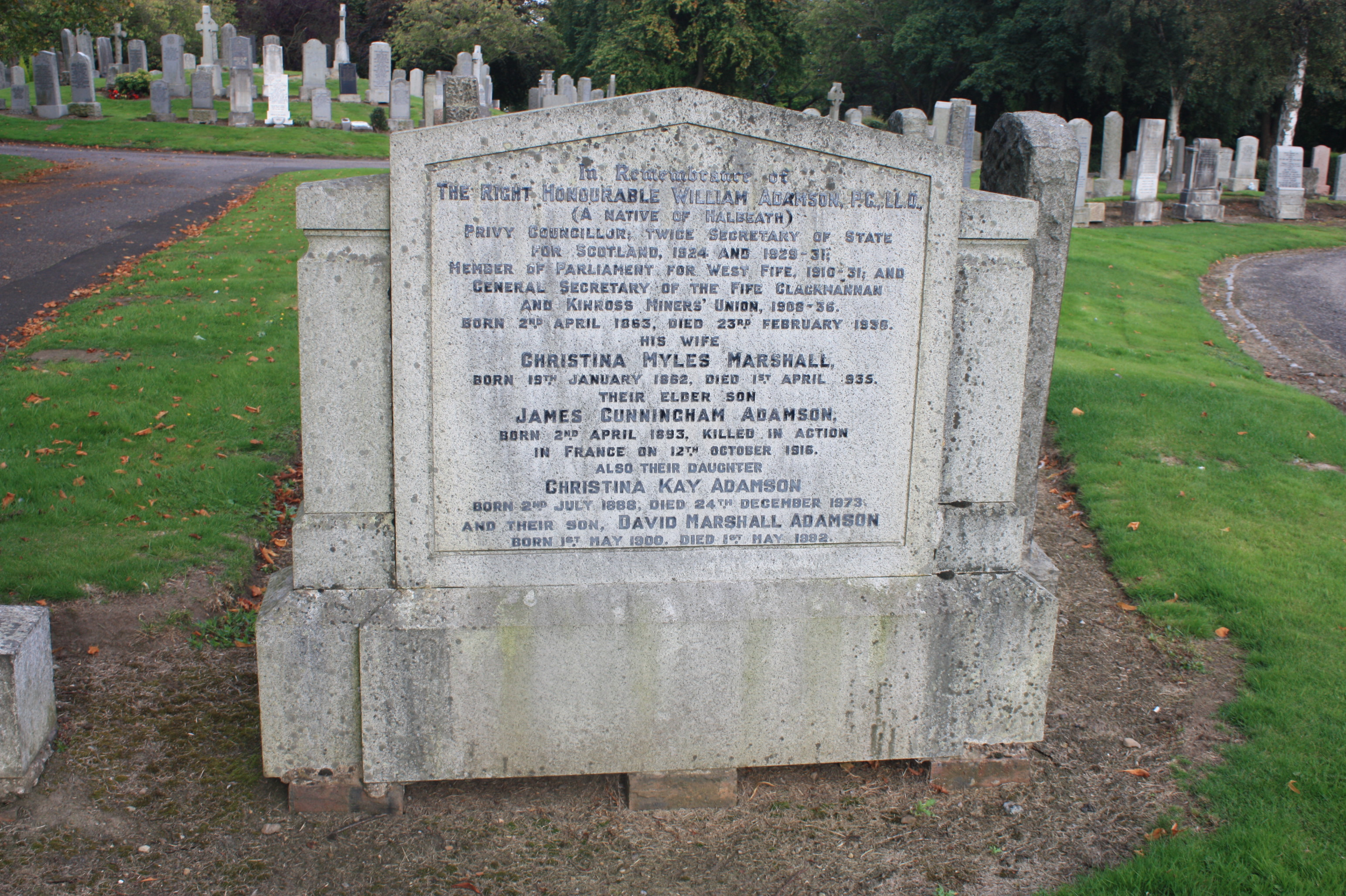
The grave of William Adamson MP, Dunfermline Cemetery

Adamson was married to Christina Myles Marshall (1862–1935), a factory worker, with whom he had two daughters and two sons; one son was killed during the First World War.

Adamson died in February 1936, aged 72. He is buried in Dunfermline Cemetery, just north of the roundel at the end of the entrance avenue.

Parliament of the United Kingdom
Preceded by John Hope	Member of Parliament for West Fife; Dec. 1910–1931	Succeeded by Charles Milne
Party political offices
Preceded by Arthur Henderson	Leader of the British Labour Party; 1917–1921	Succeeded by J. R. Clynes
Political offices
Preceded by The Viscount Novar	Secretary for Scotland; 1924	Succeeded by Sir John Gilmour
Preceded by Sir John Gilmour	Secretary of State for Scotland; 1929–1931	Succeeded by Sir Archibald Sinclair
Trade union offices
Preceded by John Weir	General Secretary of the Fife and Kinross Miners' Association; 1908 – 1917	Succeeded by James Cook
Preceded by John Robertson	Treasurer of the Scottish Miners' Federation; 1914 – 1922	Succeeded by Edward Hawke
