= David Proudfoot =

David Proudfoot may refer to:

- David Proudfoot (engineer)
- David Proudfoot (trade unionist)
