= John Hendry =

John or Jack Hendry or Hendrie may refer to:

- John Hendry (industrialist) (1843–1916), Canadian lumber magnate
- John Strathearn Hendrie (1857–1923), Canadian politician
- John C. Hendry (died 1938), Scottish trade union leader
- John V. Hendry, former chief justice of the Nebraska Supreme Court

== Sports ==
- John Hendry (footballer) (born 1970), Scottish footballer (Tottenham Hotspur, Motherwell FC)
- John Hendrie (Australian footballer) (born 1953), Australian rules footballer
- John Hendrie (Scottish footballer), (born 1963), Scottish footballer (Bradford City, Middlesbrough FC) and manager (Barnsley FC)
- Jack Hendry (footballer, born 1867) (1867–1917), Scottish footballer (Notts County)
- Jack Hendry (footballer, born 1995), Scottish footballer (Celtic FC, Club Brugge, national team)
