= Balsillie =

Balsillie may refer to:

== People with the surname ==
- James Laurence "Jim" Balsillie (Canadian businessman and philanthropist)
- John Graeme "Graeme" Balsillie (pioneer of wireless telegraphy in Australia)
- Mary Anne Balsillie (Canadian politician)

== People with the given name ==
- William Balsillie Small (Scottish trade unionist)

== Businesses including the name ==
Balsillie School of International Affairs (Centre for research into global governance and international public policy)
