= William Pearson (trade unionist) =

Scottish trade unionist and communist activist

William Pearson (1896 – 9 April 1956) was a Scottish trade unionist and communist activist.

Born in Armadale, West Lothian, Pearson's father was killed in an accident at a local coal-mine when he was only nine years old. Despite this, at the age of fourteen, he became a miner himself. The following year, his family moved to Coalburn and he worked at Auchenbeg Colliery. He became active in the Lanarkshire Miners' County Union (LMCU), and was elected to its district committee when only 19, and four years later, was elected to the executive of the LMCU.

Pearson married and moved to Stonehouse, South Lanarkshire, around 1920, and became the checkweighman at Canderigg Colliery. He joined the Socialist Labour Party and, inspired by the ideas of Daniel De Leon, he became secretary of a new Lanarkshire Miners' Industrial Union. This venture was not a success, and by 1927 he had instead joined the Communist Party of Great Britain (CPGB) and stood unsuccessfully as a National Minority Movement candidate for the executive of the National Union of Scottish Mineworkers (NUSM).

In 1934 Pearson was recognised by the 'miners welfare commission' for his services in establishing the first rehabilitation service for disabled miners in Great Britain.

Pearson was soon elected to the NUSM executive and in 1940 became President of the Lanarkshire Miners' County Union. That year, President of the NUSM Andrew Clarke died, and Pearson became acting president until Abe Moffat was elected, two years later. Pearson was elected as Treasurer in 1944, and from 1945 added the General Secretary role of the reformed National Union of Mineworkers (Scotland Area). In 1944, Pearson also became the mineworkers' representative on the council of the Scottish Trades Union Congress, and he served as its chairman in 1950.

Pearson was also active on the national and international stage. He was the Trades Union Congress's representative to the Trades and Labour Congress of Canada in 1948. The following year, he was elected to the executive of the National Union of Mineworkers, but resigned due to poor health. This poor health dogged him for the remainder of his life, although he held his trade union posts until his death in 1956.

Trade union offices
Preceded by Alexander Hunter	President of the Lanarkshire Miners' County Union; 1940–1944	Succeeded by ?
Preceded by James Cook	Secretary of the National Union of Mineworkers (Scotland Area); 1945–1956	Succeeded by John Wood
