= William Small (disambiguation) =

William Small (1734–1775) was a professor of natural philosophy, College of William and Mary in Virginia.

William Small may also refer to:

- William Small (Wisconsin politician) (1824–1900), Scottish-born Wisconsin politician
- William Small (artist) (1843–1929), Scottish artist
- William Small (basketball), American basketball coach
- William Small (Scottish politician) (1909–1978), Scottish Labour Party politician
- William Small (trade unionist) (1845–1903), Scottish trade unionist
- William B. Small (trade unionist) (1872–1944), his son, Scottish trade unionist
- William B. Small (politician) (1817–1878), U.S. Representative from New Hampshire
- William N. Small (1927–2016), U.S. Navy admiral
- William J. Small (1926–2020), American television executive
