= Washington Academy, Sunderland =

Washington Academy

Location
- Spout Lane; Washington; City of Sunderland, Tyne and Wear, NE37 2AA; England
- 54.90796°N 1.52357°W

Information
- Type: Academy
- Local authority: Sunderland City Council
- Trust: Consilium Academies
- Department for Education URN: 144937 Tables
- Ofsted: Reports
- Head Teacher: Vicky Carter
- Gender: Co-educational
- Age: 11 to 16
- Website: washingtonacademy.co.uk

Washington Academy (formerly Washington Grammar School and then Washington School) is a co-educational secondary school in Washington in the City of Sunderland, Tyne and Wear, England.

== History ==
It was originally established as a grammar school but then later became a comprehensive community school administered by Sunderland City Council, with a specialism in technology. The school moved to new buildings in 2009.

In September 2017 Washington School converted to academy status and was renamed Washington Academy. The school is now sponsored by Consilium Academies.

== Academics ==
Washington Academy offers GCSEs and vocational courses as programmes of study for pupils. Most students go on to attend Sunderland College which acts as the school's partner further education provider.

== Notable former pupils ==
=== Washington School ===
- Fraser Kemp, Labour MP from 1997 to 2010 for Houghton and Washington East

=== Washington Grammar School ===
- C. Thomas Elliott, scientist in the fields of narrow gap semiconductor and infrared detector research
- Bryan Ferry, singer-songwriter
- Willie Hamilton, Labour MP from 1950 to 1974 for West Fife and from 1974 to 1987 for Central Fife
- Howard Kendall, managed Everton in the 1980s
- Prof Gavin Kitching, professor of social sciences since 1991 at the University of New South Wales
- Dame Anne Owers (née Spark), former chief inspector of prisons
