= Robert Smith (trade unionist) =

Scottish trade union leader

Robert Smith (1862 – December 1934) was a Scottish trade union leader.

Smith worked as a coal miner in Kilwinning, Ayrshire, and became active in the Ayrshire Miners' Union (AMU). He became a full-time agent for the union and became its president in 1908, serving for many years.

Smith also became politically active, representing the Labour Party and becoming Provost of Kilwinning. At the 1918 United Kingdom general election, he stood in Bute and Northern Ayrshire, taking a distant second place with 28.5% of the vote.

The AMU was affiliated to the Scottish Mineworkers' Union (SMWU), and Smith was elected as secretary of the SMWU in 1918. He remained in the post until 1927, when he was defeated by William Allan, leader of the Lanarkshire Miners' County Union. Smith was also losing support in the AMU, perceived as being too right-wing, and members began calling for their officials to be subject to regular re-election. In 1928, members of the AMU voted Smith out of office, along with secretary James Brown and treasurer James Hood. Brown blamed the vote on agitation by members of the Communist Party of Great Britain (CPGB). However, a further vote a week later reinstated all three officials, on the condition that they put themselves up for periodic elections. By 1929, the CPGB was in decline, and Smith was again elected as secretary of the SWMU.

Smith also served on the executive of the national Miners' Federation of Great Britain in 1923 and 1930. He died late in 1934, at the age of 72.

== See also ==
- Coal mining in the United Kingdom
- Trade unions in the United Kingdom
- National Union of Scottish Mineworkers

Trade union offices
Preceded by James Brown	President of the Ayrshire Miners' Union; 1908–1934	Succeeded by James Mullen
Preceded by James Brown	General Secretary of the National Union of Scottish Mine Workers; 1918–1927	Succeeded by William Allan
Preceded by William Allan	General Secretary of the National Union of Scottish Mine Workers; 1929–1934	Succeeded by James Brown
