= Duncan Graham (British politician) =

British politician (1867–1942)

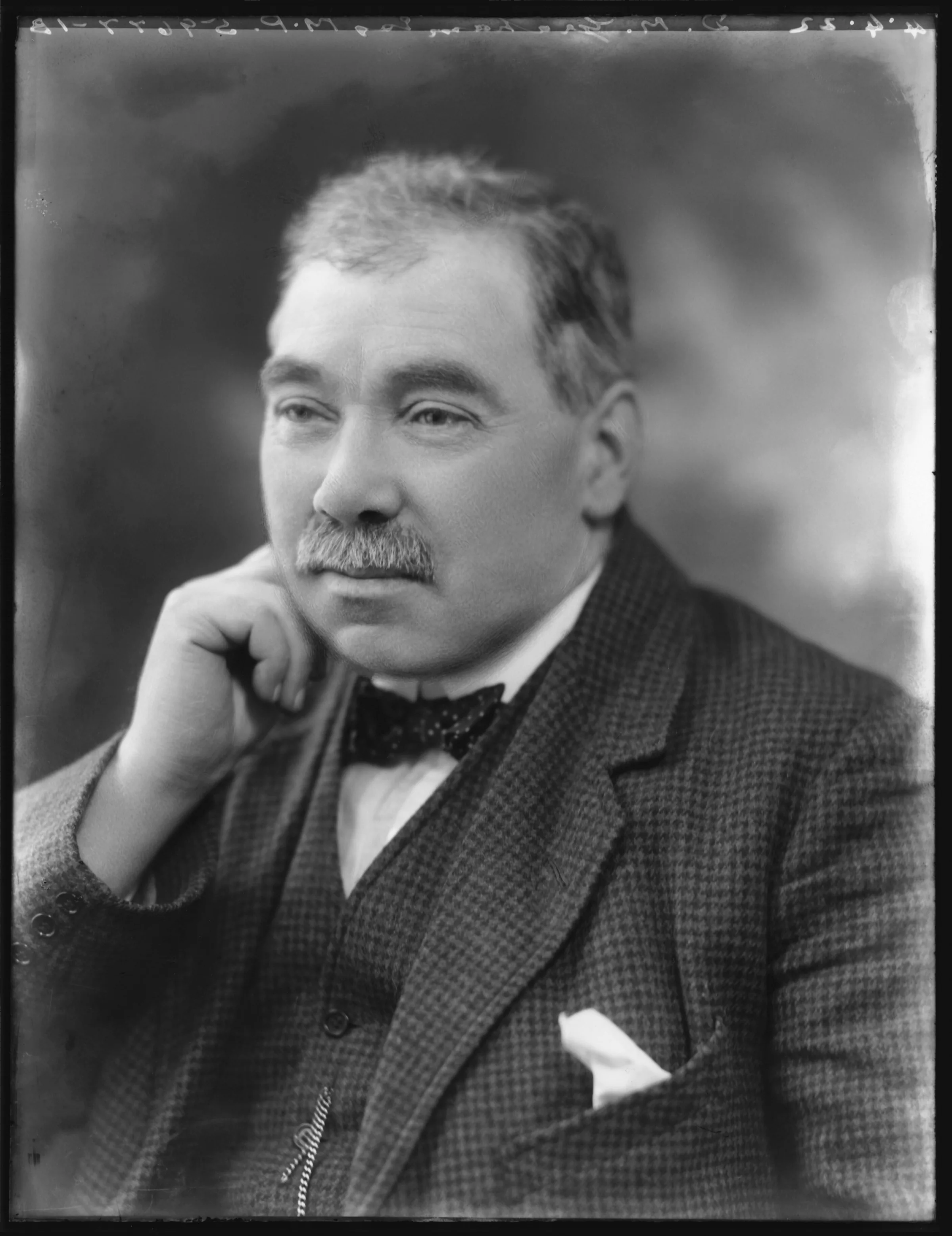
Graham in 1922

Duncan McGregor Graham (31 March 1867 – 19 October 1942) was Labour MP for Hamilton from 1918 to his death.

Born in Airdrie, Graham was educated at various local school before becoming a miner in 1878. He was elected as a checkweighman in 1892, and soon became active in the trade union movement. He served as political organiser of the Scottish Miners' Federation from 1908 until 1918, when he was elected for the Labour Party in Hamilton. That year, he also took up the post of general secretary of the Lanarkshire Miners' County Union, holding it for five years alongside his Parliamentary duties.

Parliament of the United Kingdom
| New constituency | Member of Parliament for Hamilton; 1918 – 1943 | Succeeded by Tom Fraser |
Trade union offices
| Preceded by David Gilmour | Secretary of the Lanarkshire Miners' County Union; 1918–1922 | Succeeded by William B. Small |
