= Mid and West Lothian Labour Federation =

The Mid and West Lothian Labour Federation was a trade union representing coal and shale miners in the West Lothian area of Scotland.

The union was founded in 1886 with 1,577 members, but by 1892 its membership had fallen to only 500, and it was renamed as the Amalgamated Miners and Manual Workers Union (AMMW). This new focus led to an immediate rise in membership, which reached 3,000 in 1893.

The union principally operated in West Lothian, but in its early years, it also established branches in Lanarkshire. After the Lanarkshire Miners County Union (LMCU) was founded in 1893, these led to demarcation disputes, and although both unions were founder components of the Scottish Miners' Federation (SMF), the AMMW was later expelled. Robert Small of the LMCU tried to form a rival union in West Lothian, but failed to gain the support of leading activist James Doonan, and eventually the AMMW rejoined the SMF.

Around 1920, the union became known as the West Lothian Mineworkers Union. In 1945, it was merged with other unions to form the Stirling and Lothians Area of the National Union of Mineworkers.

== General Secretaries ==
1886: John Wilson
1911: James Doonan
1919: F. Young
1920s: James Doonan
1932: John Armstrong
