= Lumphinnans =

Coordinates: 56.120°N 3.331°W

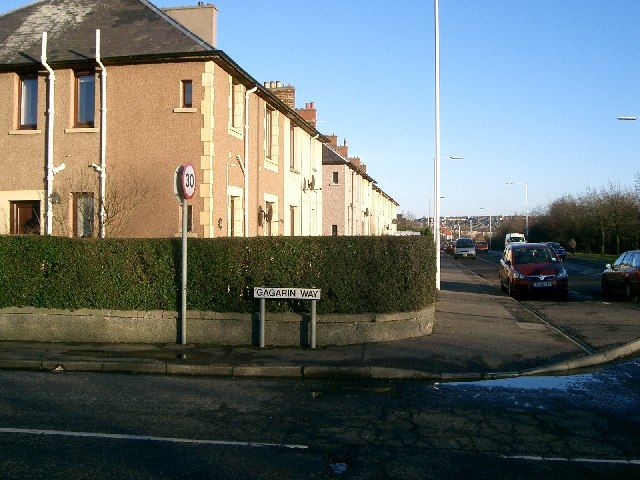
Gagarin Way

Lumphinnans (Scottish Gaelic: Lann Fhìonain) is a small, former mining village along the B981 road, from west to east between the towns of Cowdenbeath and Lochgelly, in central Fife.

Lumphinnans Primary and Community School is the local primary school, its facilities available under a community use programme in the evenings. Sporting facilities are also available at Lumphinnans Sports Hub and Lumphinnans Bowling Club, founded in 1909. Lumphinnans United A.F.C. play in the amateur football Kingdom of Fife AFA at Ochilview park.

The name Lumphinnans is derived from the Scottish Gaelic lann, 'church', of (Saint) Fhìonain or Fillan, with early sources indicating both as possibilities. The -s suffix denotes a division of the lands into northern and southern parts.

Historically, the village had nearby collieries, an ironworks and a brickworks.

Lumphinnans was nicknamed as "Little Moscow" in the 1920s and 1930s for the area's support of communism. The local left-wing council named a road Gagarin Way in the Russian cosmonaut's honour, which inspired a play of the same name by Scots playwright Gregory Burke.

== Notable people ==
- Abe Moffat (1896–1975), trade unionist, communist activist and union president
- Alex Moffat trade unionist, communist activist and union president
- Jock Rattray, footballer
- Jimmy Philp, footballer
- Lawrence Storione (1867–1922), founder of the Fife Communist Anarchist League
- Kenny Adamson professional Football Player
- Joe Temperley, jazz musician

== See also ==
- Gagarin Way, play, the title of which comes from a Lumphinnans street name in honour of the Russian cosmonaut Yuri Gagarin.
