= Bill McLean (trade unionist) =

Scottish trade unionist

William McLean (1919 – 28 September 1977) was a Scottish trade unionist.

Born in Larkhall, McLean left school at the age of fourteen to work at a local colliery. He followed his father in joining the Scottish Area of the National Union of Mineworkers, and regularly attended miners' conferences. He joined the Communist Party of Great Britain (CPGB), and became a full-time agent of the union in 1956. He served as the Mineworkers' representative on the Scottish Trades Union Congress' (STUC) General Council, and served as President of the STUC in 1967/68.

In 1968, McLean became a vice-president of the Scottish Area, then the following year was elected as its general secretary. He led the union through the UK miners' strikes of 1972 and 1974. Becoming ill in 1977, he planned to fly to East Germany for treatment, but died in hospital in Edinburgh before he could leave the country.

Trade union offices
Preceded by Alec Kitson	President of the Scottish Trades Union Congress; 1967–1968	Succeeded by John Irvine
Preceded by John McArthur	Secretary of the Fife, Clackmannan and Stirlingshire Area of the National Union of Mineworkers; 1956–1963	Succeeded by Lawrence Daly
Preceded by Lawrence Daly	Secretary of the Scottish Area of the National Union of Mineworkers; 1969–1977	Succeeded by Eric Clarke
