= James Brown (Scottish politician) =

Scottish Labour politician

The Right Honourable James Brown
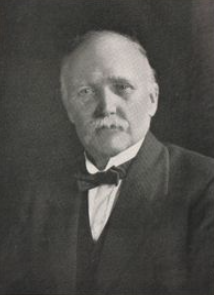
- James Brown c. 1931

Member of Parliament for South Ayrshire
- In office 14 December 1918 – 27 October 1931
- Preceded by: William Beale
- Succeeded by: James MacAndrew
- In office 14 November 1935 – 21 March 1939
- Preceded by: James MacAndrew
- Succeeded by: Alexander Sloan

Personal details
- Born: 16 December 1862 Whitletts, Ayrshire, Scotland
- Died: 21 March 1939 (aged 76) Ayr, Ayrshire, Scotland
- Party: Labour
- Spouse: Catherine MacGregor Steel (m. 1888)

James Brown, OBE, DL (16 December 1862 – 21 March 1939) was a Scottish Labour politician.

== Early life ==
James Brown was born in the Whitletts area of Ayr, to James Brown (1839-1895) and Christina O'Hara (1840-1923). At that time Whitletts was a mining village separate from Ayr, however Whitletts became part of Ayr in 1935. His father had been a weaver in Ayr, and had later in life had managed to become a colliery manager. Brown had strong Scottish and Irish roots on both sides of his family. He lived most of his life in Annbank where he went to school. In 1888 he married his wife Catherine "Katie" MacGregor Steel. They had five children together.

== Career ==
Brown started working as a miner from the age of 12. He would later become Secretary of the Ayrshire Miners' Union and of its national affiliate, the National Union of Scottish Mineworkers. He unsuccessfully contested North Ayrshire in January 1910 and was the Member of Parliament (MP) for South Ayrshire from 1918–1931 and from 1935 until his death in 1939. He was awarded the OBE in 1917, appointed a Privy Counsellor in 1930.

He was a member of the Scottish National War Memorial committee formed in 1918 by the then Secretary of State for Scotland, the Liberal MP Robert Munro, which was tasked with forming a permanent memorial for World War I at Edinburgh Castle. Brown himself had lost a son in the war. He personally opened the local war memorial at Tarbolton, which was just 3 miles from his home in Annbank and was home to many of his relatives.

In 1927 he criticised the decision to include Walter Thomas Monnington's painting Parliamentary Union of England and Scotland, 1707 in the Palace of Westminster which he said in a debate should "get rid of this disgraceful picture and put something in its place which would be more true to history than it is." His Labour Party colleague, Dundee MP Tom Johnston further described the outrage at the inclusion of the painting by saying "the only historical painting in St Stephen's Hall representing an incident in Scottish history deals with an act of national humiliation."

In his authorised biography, Bill Shankly said that Brown won the election in South Ayrshire as the local voters "wouldn't vote Conservative" but that he was "too mild" and not enough of a "keen socialist" for some of the more militant Labour members.

He was Lord High Commissioner to the General Assembly of the Church of Scotland three times, in 1924, 1930 and 1931. He was granted the Freedom of the Royal Burgh of Ayr in 1930, and of Girvan in 1931 and was awarded an Honorary LLD by the University of Glasgow in 1931. He was a Deputy Lieutenant of Ayrshire.

== Personal life ==
His life story "From Pit To Palace" by Alexander Gammie was published in 1931. He taught at the local sunday school in Annbank, and in his later years was unofficially nicknamed the "Uncrowned King of Annbank". According to newspapers, during his time as Lord High Commissioner he developed a rapport with George V. Despite being rewarded a salary of £10,000, he and his wife never moved from their two room miner's cottage in Annbank until it was demolished by Ayr County Council in the early 1930s.

James and his wife had five children; two died before adulthood and one son was killed in the First World War. Through his wife, he was the great-uncle of the future first Presiding Officer of the Scottish Parliament David Steel.

In February 1935, Brown along with an agent were both injured in a car accident near Coatbridge.

James Brown died on 21 March 1939 in an Ayr nursing home at the age of 76 from heart failure, with his children at his bedside. George VI sent a personal telegram to his family expressing condolences. Newspapers reported that his last words were "Look after Katie"; referring to his wife, who was bedridden at home. She died in 1942.

The couple are buried in Annbank Cemetery, and there is a memorial for Brown in Annbank's main street, Weston Avenue. Another street in Annbank, Brown's Crescent, is named after him, as is James Brown Avenue (colloquially called "Jaba" by locals) in the Whitletts area of Ayr where he was from.

Trade union offices
Preceded by John Bank?	President of the Ayrshire Miners' Union; 1894–1908	Succeeded by Robert Smith
Preceded by Peter Muir	Secretary of the Ayrshire Miners' Union; 1908–1939	Succeeded by Alexander Sloan
Preceded by John C. Hendry	President of the Scottish Trades Union Congress; 1911	Succeeded by David Palmer
Preceded by Edward Judson and David Watts Morgan	Auditor of the Trades Union Congress; 1913–1914; With: Edward Duxbury	Succeeded by Tom Shaw and J. Wood
Preceded by Robert Brown	Secretary of the Scottish Miners' Federation; 1917–1918	Succeeded by Robert Smith
Preceded by Robert Smith	Secretary of the Scottish Miners' Federation; 1934–1936	Succeeded by Alexander Sloan
