= George Bolton (trade unionist) =

Scottish trade unionist and communist activist

George Bolton (born 1934) is a Scottish former trade unionist and communist activist.

The son of Guy Bolton and nephew of John Bolton, both prominent Scottish communist miners, George joined the Communist Party of Great Britain at the age of sixteen, and was active in the 1959 strike against the closure of the Devon Colliery. He later found work mining in Clackmannan in Scotland, although for a time he was based in Stoke-on-Trent. He was the delegate from the Bogside Mine to the Scottish Area of the National Union of Mineworkers until 1978, when he was elected vice-president of the area, and became a full-time official as Agent in 1980. He held both these posts during the UK miners' strike, then succeeded Mick McGahey as president in 1987. He became an increasingly vocal critic of Arthur Scargill, opposing Scargill's attempts to sue Robert Maxwell for libel, and later becoming convinced that Scargill had misdirected some funds from the Soviet Union, intended to support the miners during the strike.

Bolton was also a prominent Eurocommunist in the Communist Party of Great Britain (CPGB). First elected to the party's executive in 1978, he became the party's chairman, serving until 1990, by when he was regarded as the leading trade unionist in the party. In 1984, during infighting in the CPGB, he was one of only two official CPGB candidates elected to the board of the party's former newspaper, the Morning Star. When the party dissolved, he remained active in its successor, Democratic Left.

In 1992, Bolton led a march of Scottish miners from Glasgow to London, in protest at proposals to close more mines in the nation. He retired in about 1996, and his post as president was not filled.

Party political offices
Preceded by Ron Halverson	Chair of the Communist Party of Great Britain; 1980s–1990	Succeeded by Marian Darke
Political offices
Preceded by Mick McGahey	President of the Scottish Area of the National Union of Mineworkers; 1987–c.1996	Succeeded by Position vacant
