= Ayrshire Miners' Union =

The Ayrshire Miners' Union was a coal mining trade union based in Scotland.

== History ==
The first Ayrshire Miners' Union was founded in 1880, with Keir Hardie as its organiser. The union supported a strike for higher wages over the winter of 1881/82, but this was unsuccessful, and the union dissolved.

A new union was founded in 1886, with its Hardie elected as its first secretary. In 1893, it was reorganised on a federal basis and renamed the Ayrshire Miners' Federal Union. It was a founder of the Scottish Miners' Federation (SMF) in 1894, and by 1897 it claimed 3,000 members out of a total workforce of 10,000 in the county, making it the third-largest component of the federation.

In 1944, the SMF became the unitary National Union of Scottish Mineworkers, and the union became its Ayrshire District, with less autonomy than before.

== Secretaries ==
1886: Keir Hardie
1889: Peter Muir
1908: James Brown
1939: Alexander Sloan

== Presidents ==
1886: John Bank
1894: James Brown
1908: Robert Smith
1934: James Mullen
