= Willie Hamilton =

British Labour politician (1917–2000)

- Hamilton, c. 1973

Member of Parliament for West Fife
- In office 23 February 1950 – 8 February 1974
- Preceded by: Willie Gallacher
- Succeeded by: Constituency abolished

Member of Parliament for Central Fife
- In office 28 February 1974 – 18 May 1987
- Preceded by: New constituency
- Succeeded by: Henry McLeish

Personal details
- Born: William Winter Hamilton; 26 June 1917 Houghton-le-Spring, England
- Died: 23 January 2000 (aged 82) Lincoln, England
- Party: Labour
- Spouses: Joan Callow (m. 1944; died 1968) Margaret Cogle (m. 1982)
- Children: 2
- Education: Washington Grammar School, Sheffield University

Military service
- Allegiance: United Kingdom
- Branch/service: British Army
- Rank: Captain
- Unit: Pioneer Corps

William Winter Hamilton (26 June 1917 – 23 January 2000) was a British politician who served as a Labour Member of Parliament for constituencies in Fife, Scotland for 37 years, between 1950 and 1987. He was known for his strong republican views.

== Background ==
Born in Houghton-le-Spring, the son of a County Durham miner, Hamilton joined the Labour Party as a teenager in 1936. He was educated at Washington Grammar School and Sheffield University (BA, DipEd), and following graduation became a schoolteacher. After initially being a conscientious objector in World War II, he served as a captain with the Pioneer Corps in the Middle East.

== Parliamentary career ==
Hamilton contested West Fife at the 1945 general election, but lost to Communist Willie Gallacher.

In 1950 he overturned that result, winning by over 13,000 votes. In 1974, after boundary changes, he became MP for Fife Central.

In 1986 Hamilton was replaced as Labour candidate in Fife Central by Henry McLeish, and stood in the ultra-safe Conservative seat of South Hams in Devon, South-West England, where he came third, polling just 8% of the vote and losing to Conservative candidate and sitting MP Anthony Steen.

== Republican views ==
He sponsored the equal pay for equal work bill in the 1970s but is best remembered for his stridently republican views, which he set out in detail in his book My Queen and I. He branded the Queen "a clockwork doll", Princess Margaret "a floozy", Prince Charles "a twerp", and remarked upon the birth of Princess Anne's son "How charming, another one on the payroll." However, he admired the Queen Mother, declaring on her 80th birthday: "I am glad to salute a remarkable old lady. May she live to be the pride of the family."

== Personal life ==
In 1944, Hamilton married Joan Callow (died 1968), with whom he had a daughter and a son. He married his second wife Margaret Cogle in 1982 and from his retirement in 1987 until his death the couple lived in Woodhall Spa in Lincolnshire. Willie Hamilton died in Lincoln in 2000, aged 82.

Parliament of the United Kingdom
Preceded by Willie Gallacher	Member of Parliament for West Fife; 1950–February 1974	Constituency abolished
New constituency	Member of Parliament for Central Fife; February 1974–1987	Succeeded by Henry McLeish
