= Lawrence Daly =

Lawrence Daly (20 October 1924 – 23 May 2009) was a coal miner, trade unionist and political activist.

Born in Fife as one of nine children, Daly's father Jimmy was a miner and a founder member of the Communist Party of Great Britain (CPGB), who suffered blacklisting due to his activities during the 1926 general strike. Jimmy was of Irish Catholic extraction whilst Lawrence's mother Janet was a Presbyterian. Lawrence was educated at local Catholic schools: he later said that his education had left him with both a considerable knowledge of Scottish poetry and "a need for a strongly authoritative dogma". He subsequently pursued adult education through correspondence courses organised by the National Council of Labour Colleges. At 15, Lawrence Daly began work as a miner at Glencraig Colliery. At this time he also joined the Young Communist League.

Daly was soon active in the Scottish Mineworkers' Union. His initial involvement was in the labour movement's youth wing; amongst other activities he represented the British Trades Union Congress (TUC) on an international youth delegation to Moscow in 1945. He wrote a pamphlet on the visit titled A Young Miner Sees Russia, which was published the following year. He also attended the 1945 World Youth Conference in London as a delegate, where he met his future wife, Renee, who attended as a delegate from Worcestershire Youth Clubs. He was chair of the Scottish TUC's Youth Committee, and later was elected chair of the Scottish Youth Committee of the National Union of Mineworkers (NUM). He held a variety of offices in the Glencraig NUM Branch, probably the most important for an aspiring activist was his ten years as Workman's Inspector, an appointment provided for under the coal mines safety legislation.

Although active in the CPGB from 1940, he was having differences with party doctrine from the late 1940s. Despite these differences, in 1951 Daly spent some time as full-time party agent in West Fife. He eventually left the Party in 1956, shortly before the mass exodus of membership over the Soviet invasion of Hungary. He became associated with the formation of the "New Left", in its journals New Reasoner and later the New Left Review. In 1957, Daly helped to found the Fife Socialist League. He joined the Campaign for Nuclear Disarmament the same year. He was elected as a County Councillor for the Ballingry division in May 1958, and at the 1959 general election, he took 10.7% of the vote in West Fife, easily beating the CPGB candidate. When the FSL disbanded in 1964, Daly joined the Labour Party. In the late 1960s Daly served as a member of the Russell Tribunal which investigated alleged war crimes committed by the United States in the Vietnam War.

Daly rose through the NUM ranks. He was elected to the National Union of Mineworkers Scottish Area Executive Committee in 1962, became the full-time agent for the Fife, Clackmannan and Stirling District a year later, and then General Secretary of the Scottish Area NUM in 1965. Daly was part of the movement in the mid-1960s for the abolition of piecework at the coalface, and its replacement by a national day wage structure— the National Power Loading Agreement (NPLA) of 1966. In 1968, Daly was elected General Secretary of the NUM, and following what had by then almost become a tradition in the NUM, worked with two moderate Presidents, Sidney Ford and Joe Gormley. As a result of his election he moved from Scotland to London to base himself at the union's headquarters on Euston Road. He steered the union through two major strikes in 1972 and 1974. Both strikes were a response to a massive falling behind of miners wages generally, and of coalface workers wages particularly; these occasioned by the effects of the "standstill" clauses in the NPLA, where the highest paid colliers in the Midlands and Nottinghamshire gave up any real pay increases as they waited until faceworkers' shift rates in Scotland, Wales and other areas caught up.

Following the 1974 strike, Prime Minister Edward Heath called a general election over the issue of "who governs Britain". He lost, although his successor as leader of the Conservative Party successfully all but destroyed the NUM little over ten years later. Daly sustained a serious injury in a road accident in 1975, in which his brother and sister-in-law were killed, and had prolonged leave of absence following it. He was succeeded as NUM General Secretary by Peter Heathfield from the Derbyshire Area in 1984. Following his retirement he settled in Berkhamsted, before spending the last ten years of his life in a nursing home in Luton.

== Death ==
Lawrence Daly died on 23 May 2009. He was survived by his wife Renee and five children: daughter Shannon, and sons Rannoch, Morven, Kerran and Cavan.

Trade union offices
Preceded by Bill McLean	General Secretary of the Fife, Clackmannan and Stirlingshire Area of the National Union of Mineworkers; 1963–1965	Succeeded by ?
Preceded by John Wood	General Secretary of the Scottish Area of the National Union of Mineworkers; 1965–1968	Succeeded by Bill McLean
Preceded by Will Paynter	General Secretary of the National Union of Mineworkers; 1968–1984	Succeeded by Peter Heathfield
