= Lawrence Storione =

Scottish miner and political figure

Lawrence Storione (1867–1922) was a Fife miner and political figure. He is best known for founding the Anarchist Communist League in Cowdenbeath, Scotland.

== Life ==
Apparently the son of the Italian stonemason Felix Storione and Philomena Moir (or Noir), and a French citizen according to the United Kingdom Census 1901, Lawrence Storione worked as a miner in Italy, France, Belgium and the west of Scotland. In 1908, he settled in Lumphinnans, Fife, after fleeing France dressed as a woman. He married Annie Cowan whom he met whilst living in Hamilton, Lanarkshire in 1900. They named their children Annie, Germinal, Libertie, Autonomie, Grace and Anarchie.

He was injured in a pit accident during the First World War.

He died in 1922.

== Political Activity ==
Storione founded the Fife Anarchist Communist League in Cowdenbeath, which 'preached a heady mixture of De Leonist Marxism and the anarchist teachings of Kropotkin and Stirner, a libertarian communism which was fiercely critical of the union.'

The League ran a bookshop in Cowdenbeath and his eldest daughter, Annie, ran the Proletarian Sunday School which used the Industrial Workers of the World's Little Red Songbook.
