= Bill Lauchlan =

Scottish activist (1916–2009)

William Sinclair Lauchlan (or Laughlan, 10 May 1916 – 2009) was a Scottish communist activist.

Lauchlan was born in Irvine in May 1916 to James Lauchlan, a plasterer, and Catherine Sinclair. He was educated to secondary school level. A Plasterer to trade, Lauchlan joined the Independent Labour Party in Irvine, Ayrshire 1933, then in 1935 switched to the Communist Party of Great Britain (CPGB). He quickly rose to prominence, serving as Lanarkshire Organiser in the 1940s, then becoming Scottish District Secretary in about 1951, then in the 1960s served as National Organiser.

He was also active on Glasgow Trades Council, and in 1946 represented it at the Scottish Trades Union Congress.

Lauchlan stood for the CPGB in Glasgow Govan at the 1950 general election, then in West Fife in 1951, 1955, 1959 and 1964, although he was never elected. Following his retirement from being a full-time officer within the CPGB, Lauchlan returned to Glasgow in 1968 and worked for Scottish Homes in Glasgow and Edinburgh until his retirement in 1981. In retirement, he worked as a Volunteer with the Citizens Advice Bureau in Livingston, having moved to the New Town in West Lothian/Midlothian in 1972.

He was interviewed in May 2000 in Moffat, Dumfriesshire. Lauchlan died in Kelso in 2009 at the age of 93.

Party political offices
Preceded by John Gollan	Secretary of the Scottish District of the Communist Party of Great Britain; 1947 – 1956	Succeeded by Gordon McLennan
Preceded by John Gollan	National Organiser of the Communist Party of Great Britain; 1956 – 1966	Succeeded by Gordon McLennan
