= Lothian Small =

British activist

Small c. 1925

Gladstone Lothian Rosebery Small (31 August 1884 – early 1979) was a British labour movement activist.

Small was born in Cambuslang. The son of William Small, a prominent trade unionist, and the brother of William B. and Robert, both of whom also went into trade unionism, Lothian instead attended the University of Glasgow, although he did not enter until he was 22 as it took him several attempts to pass the entrance exam.

While at university, Small was active in the student union and the student Fabian Society. It took him six years to graduate, although he received master's degrees in both philosophy and English.

During World War I, Small served as an officer with the South Staffordshire Regiment. Afterwards, he became a frequent Parliamentary candidate for the Labour Party, standing unsuccessfully in Exeter at the 1923 general election, then in Walsall in 1924 and a 1925 by-election. During this period, he was heavily involved with the League of Nations, serving on the secretariat of its Supreme Council, then as secretary of its Labour Advisory Committee, and later as Secretary of the International Federation of League of Nations Societies.

In 1923, Small made the news when he was held up by robbers near Palermo who stole his money and papers; he stated that he believed they had committed the robbery due to hunger.

Small married a Hungarian woman named Frieda in 1931, who was a prominent figure in Save the Children. She died in 1939, and Small remarried to a Swiss woman named Jeanne-Marie de Morsier who worked at the International Union of Child Welfare. They lived in London until the 1950s; at this point, they appear to have moved to Manchester, and based there, Small translated a book on the history of Painting of Central Asia published by Skira and a number of plays from Italian into English.

Small died in the Surrey SE registration district in the first quarter of 1979.
