= Robert Brown (trade unionist) =

Scottish trade unionist

Robert Brown (1848–1917) was a Scottish trade unionist.

Born in Dalkeith, Brown left school at eleven and began working at the local colliery. In 1870, he moved to the United States and worked as a coal miner there for two years before returning to Scotland. He became an active trade unionist, and in 1890 was elected as secretary of the Mid and East Lothian Miners' Association.

In 1894, Brown was a key mover in creating the Scottish Miners' Federation (SMF), and was elected as its second secretary, soon after its formation. The SMF affiliated to the Miners' Federation of Great Britain and Brown served on its executive on several occasions.

Brown was elected to Dalkeith Burgh Council as a member of the Liberal Party and served as provost on three occasions. He followed his union in transferring his affiliation to the Labour Party, and stood unsuccessfully in the 1912 Midlothian by-election.

Trade union offices
Preceded by Unknown	Secretary of the Mid and East Lothian Miners' Association; 1890 – 1917	Succeeded by Joseph Young
Preceded by Chisholm Robertson	Secretary of the Scottish Miners' Federation c.1896 – 1917	Succeeded by James Brown
