= Charles Milne (politician) =

Scottish lawyer and politician

Charles Black Milne, QC (1879 – 17 February 1960) was a Scottish lawyer and politician who served as Unionist Party MP for West Fife from 1931 to 1935.

Normally a safe Labour seat, he did well to win it in narrowly in the National Government landslide victory of 1931, but lost it to Willie Gallacher of the Communist Party in 1935.

He had previously contested Dumbarton Burghs unsuccessfully at the 1929 general election.

He was Sheriff of Dumfries and Galloway from 1939 until his death.

Parliament of the United Kingdom
Preceded by William Adamson	Member of Parliament for West Fife; 1931–1935	Succeeded by Willie Gallacher
