= James Doonan (trade unionist) =

Scottish trade unionist

James Doonan (1868 – 19 April 1932) was a Scottish trade unionist.

Born in West Calder, in West Lothian, Doonan left school at the age of twelve and became a coal miner. He soon became involved in trade unionism, and was elected as checkweighman of his local pit. This led him to election as assistant agent for the Amalgamated Miners and Manual Workers Union (AMMW), which represented local miners, and as secretary of his local Bathgate Miners' Association. Around this time, demarcation disputes between the AMMW and the Lanarkshire Miners' County Union (LMCU) led the union to leave the Scottish Miners' Federation (SMF). The SMF sent Robert Small of the LMCU to attempt to found a rival union in West Lothian, and he attempted to persuade Doonan to lead it, but Doonan refused, and the AMMW later rejoined the SMF.

In 1912, Doonan was elected as secretary and agent of the AMMW, after the union's executive decided that he would be the only candidate put forward for a vote.

Doonan was also active in the Labour Party, serving on Bathgate Town Council from 1910, and serving as Provost from 1923 until 1926. From 1929 until his death, he was president of the National Union of Scottish Mineworkers, and he also served on the executive of the Miners' Federation of Great Britain.

Doonan became ill in April 1932, and died a few days later.

Trade union offices
Preceded by Robert Smillie	President of the National Union of Scottish Mineworkers; 1929 – 1932	Succeeded by Andrew Clarke
