= Gagarin Way =

Play by Gregory Burke

Gagarin Way is a play by Scottish playwright Gregory Burke, named after a street in the West Fife village of Lumphinnans, on the edge of Cowdenbeath. The play documents the disappearance of socialism from an area where political radicalism was once a defining characteristic of the population. Gagarin Way debuted at the Traverse Theatre, Edinburgh, in July 2001, before transferring to the National Theatre and the West End in London. It was translated into 20 languages and toured the world.
