= Mick McGahey =

Scottish trade unionist (1925–1999)

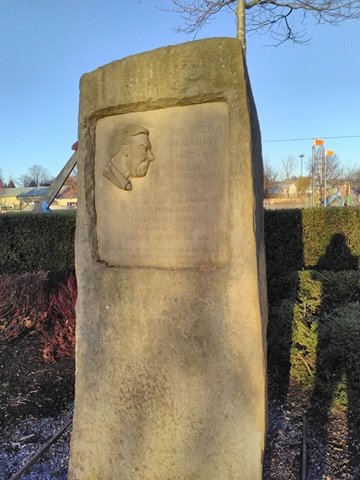
- Memorial to Mick McGahey, King George V Park, Bonnyrigg, Midlothian
- Born: Michael McGahey; 29 May 1925; Shotts, Lanarkshire, Scotland
- Died: 30 January 1999 (aged 73); Edinburgh, Scotland
- Citizenship: United Kingdom
- Occupations: Miner, trade union leader
- Organization: National Union of Mineworkers
- Known for: Life long communist activist and trade union leader
- Political party: Communist Party of Great Britain (CPGB)
- Spouse: Catherine Young (wife)
- Father: John McGahey

Michael McGahey (29 May 1925 – 30 January 1999) was a Scottish miners' leader and communist. He had a distinctive gravelly voice, and described himself as "a product of my class and my movement".

== Early life ==
His father, John McGahey, worked in the mines at Shotts, North Lanarkshire when Mick was born. John was a founder member of the Communist Party of Great Britain and took an active part in the 1926 General Strike. The family moved to Cambuslang in search of work, and it was here that McGahey went to school.

McGahey started work at age 14 at the Gateside Colliery, and continued to work as a miner for the next 25 years. He followed his father into the Communist Party and the National Union of Mineworkers (NUM), remaining a member of both the Communist Party, until its dissolution in 1990, and the NUM, all his life.

== Trade unionist and communist ==
He became chairman of the local branch of his union when he was only eighteen and thereafter progressed through its echelons, though never quite reaching the national presidency. He was elected to the Scottish Executive of the NUM in 1958, becoming president of the Scottish area in 1967. He was regarded as a highly competent operator but his strongly militant line was opposed by others in the Union. He was defeated in the 1971 elections for National President by Joe Gormley.

McGahey was, however, elected National Vice-president of the NUM in 1972. He made similar progress in the Communist Party of Great Britain (CPGB), being elected to its Executive in 1971. He remained a member until the CPGB dissolved in 1991 and then joined its successor in Scotland, the Communist Party of Scotland. From 1970 onwards he was the subject of phone tapping by the UK security service MI5, whose transcribers found him difficult to understand because of his accent and the effects of alcohol consumption.

He came to the attention of the public during the miners strikes of 1972 and 1974. He later claimed these were purely industrial disputes, made political by Prime Minister, Edward Heath. Nevertheless, he took a characteristically militant line, opposing some of the tactics of Gormley, accusing him of "ballotisis" and swearing he would not be "constitutionalised" out of a national strike. Gormley, it was later claimed, postponed his own retirement until 1981, by which time McGahey was over 55, too old by union rules to stand for president.

He played a smaller role (mostly on Scottish affairs) during the 1984–1985 miners' strike, as he was nearing retirement. He opposed the holding of a national ballot and favoured letting regions make their own decisions on whether to strike. He saw the appointment of Ian MacGregor as chair of the National Coal Board as a "declaration of war". James Cowan, then deputy chairman of the NCB, claims that McGahey warned him to retire in 1983 and protect his health, as he feared that a "bloody" strike was inevitable with the appointment of Ian MacGregor and that there would be conflict between different regions in the NUM.

According to Christopher Andrew's The Defence of the Realm: The Authorized History of MI5, surveillance by MI5 on McGahey during the 1984–85 miners' strike found that he was "extremely angry and embarrassed" about Scargill's links with the Libyan government, but that he was "happy to take part, with Scargill and other NUM leaders, in contacts with Soviet representatives".

After the strike, McGahey became more critical of Arthur Scargill and argued against the growing concentration of power within the NUM in the national leadership at the expense of regional areas. He expressed regret on the use of violent picketing in Nottinghamshire and the divisions that this caused amongst mineworkers, saying:

I am not sure we handled it all correctly. The mass intrusion of pickets into Notts, not just Yorkshiremen; I accept some responsibility for that, and so will the left have to. I think if as an executive we had approached Notts without pickets, it might have been different. Because I reject, I have made this clear since the strike, that 25 or 30,000 Notts miners, their wives and families and communities are scabs and blacklegs. I refuse to accept this. We did alienate them during the strike.

McGahey continuously insisted that the NUM find a way to reconcile with the Union of Democratic Mineworkers (a Midlands-based breakaway from the NUM). Scargill referred to this insistence as a "tragedy that people from the far north should pontificate about what we should be doing to win back members for the NUM."

=== Comments following the death of Ian MacGregor ===
On the death of Ian MacGregor (chair of the National Coal Board during the 1984–85 strike), McGahey said, "It's no loss to people of my ilk. MacGregor was a vicious, anti-trades unionist, anti-working class person, recruited by the Tory government quite deliberately for the purpose of destroying trade unionism in the mining industry. I will not suffer any grief, not will I in any way cry over the loss of Ian MacGregor."

== Memorials ==
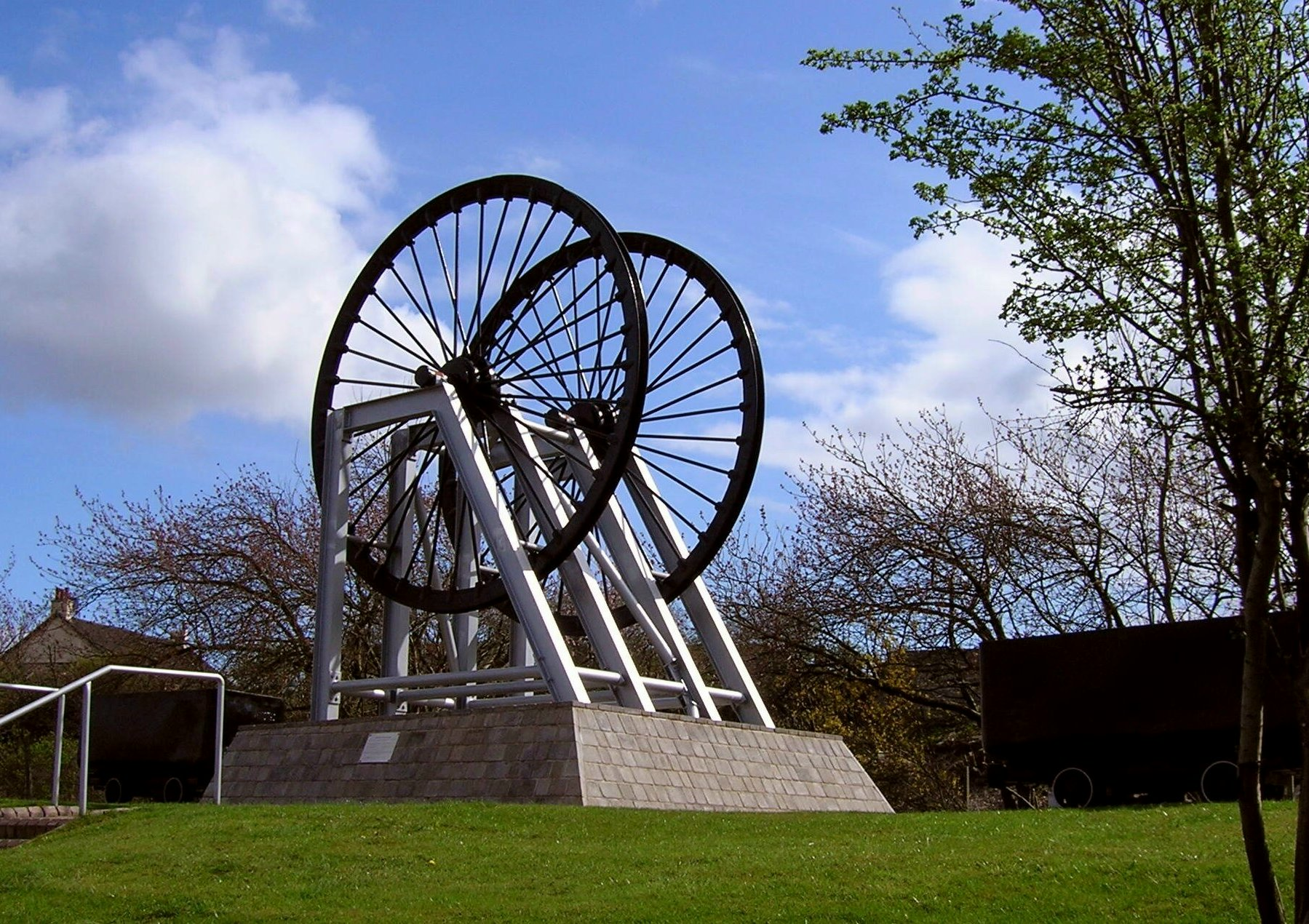
The Memorial to Mick McGahey in Cambuslang

He married Catherine Young in 1954 with whom he had two daughters and a son.

A heavy smoker for most of his life, McGahey suffered in later years from chronic emphysema and pneumoconiosis.

A significant memorial, in the form of mine workings, stands to him at the east end of Cambuslang Main Street and there have been calls in the Scottish Parliament for a more national memorial.

On 28 April 2006, in Bonnyrigg, ex-UNISON general secretary Rodney Bickerstaffe unveiled a memorial to mark the 10th Anniversary of McGahey's address to the Midlothian TUC Worker's Memorial Day event in George V Park. McGahey's son was present.

Bickerstaffe described McGahey as a "working class hero" who never lost touch with his roots and socialist values. He listed some of McGahey's sayings which were just as relevant today. "We are a movement not a monument", he quoted as a reminder of the need to continue to move and to fight on, and finished by saying "We know the reasons why Michael never became NUM President, but whether he had stayed as a steward or a delegate he would still have had a major impact on the movement".

Trade union offices
Preceded by Alex Moffat	President of the Scottish Area of the National Union of Mineworkers; 1967–1987	Succeeded by George Bolton
Preceded by Sid Schofield	Vice-President of the National Union of Mineworkers; 1972–1987	Succeeded by Sammy Thompson
Party political offices
Preceded by Irene Swann	Chairman of the Communist Party of Great Britain; 1974–1978	Succeeded by Ron Halverson
