= John Gollan =

British communist party leader (1911–1977)

6th General Secretary of the Communist Party of Great Britain
- In office 13 May 1956 – 11 March 1975
- Preceded by: Harry Pollitt
- Succeeded by: Gordon McLennan

Personal details
- Born: 2 April 1911 Edinburgh, Scotland
- Died: 5 September 1977 (aged 66) London, England
- Party: Communist Party of Great Britain (CPGB)
- Occupation: Painter, signwriter, newspaper editor
- Known for: British communist activism

John Gollan (2 April 1911 – 5 September 1977) was a British political leader who was general secretary of the Communist Party of Great Britain (CPGB) from 1956 to 1975.

== Biography ==
Gollan was born on 2 April 1911 in Edinburgh to Duncan Gollan, a signwriter and house painter, and Mary Dunn, who were both socialists. He had seven siblings.

He attended James Clark School, but left before the age of 14 to become a painter's apprentice. His first introduction to political activity was during the 1926 general strike when he helped distribute the papers of the strike committee. On International Workers' Day, 1 May, the following year, he joined the CPGB and its youth wing the Young Communist League (YCL). He became a signwriter, but his career was cut short in July 1931 when he was arrested for distributing anti-militarist leaflets. He had been organising soldiers to demand better rights and conditions, an activity for which he was sentenced to six months' imprisonment, which he served at HM Prison Edinburgh. After a popular campaign calling for his release, he was freed in January 1932 and began working for the party.

Gollan became the editor of the YCL's newspaper The Young Worker and its successor publication Challenge. He did this for several years, until his election as General Secretary of the YCL in 1935. He then held various regional posts, before becoming the party's national organiser in 1945. In 1949, he became assistant editor of the Daily Worker, and in 1954 he became the party's Assistant General Secretary.

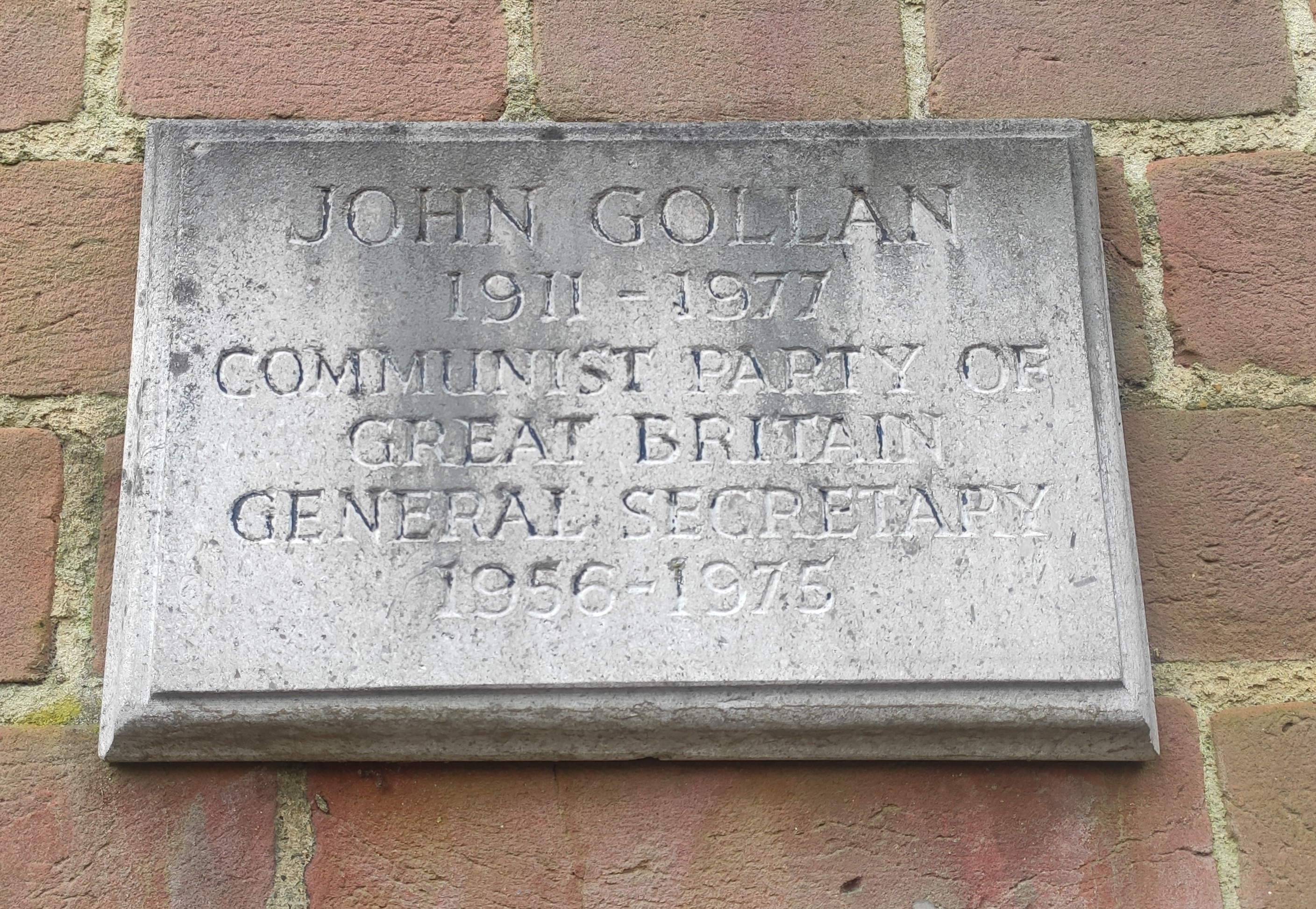
Plaque dedicated to Gollan at Golders Green Crematorium

In 1956, he became the party's General Secretary and immediately had to deal with the drop in membership following the Soviet crushing of the Hungarian Revolution. He held the post until 9 March 1975, when he resigned after being diagnosed with lung cancer.

Gollan died on 5 September 1977 in London. He was survived by his wife, son and daughter. He was cremated at Golders Green Crematorium.

Party political offices
Preceded by Wally Tapsell?	National Secretary of the Young Communist League; 1935 - 1940	Succeeded by Ted Willis
Preceded by Jock McBain	Secretary of the Scottish District of the Communist Party of Great Britain; 1941 - 1947	Succeeded by Bill Lauchlan
Position recreated	Assistant General Secretary of the Communist Party of Great Britain; 1947 - 1949	Succeeded by George Matthews
Preceded by Mick Bennett	National Organiser of the Communist Party of Great Britain; 1954 - 1956	Succeeded by Bill Lauchlan
Preceded by Harry Pollitt	General Secretary of the Communist Party of Great Britain; 1956 - 1975	Succeeded by Gordon McLennan
