= Gordon McLennan (politician) =

British politician (1924–2011)

7th General Secretary of the Communist Party of Great Britain
- In office 11 March 1975 – January 1990
- Preceded by: John Gollan
- Succeeded by: Nina Temple

Personal details
- Born: 12 May 1924; Glasgow, Scotland
- Died: 21 May 2011 (aged 87); London, England
- Political party: Communist Party of Great Britain; Communist Party of Scotland
- Spouse: Mary (m. 1950)
- Children: 4
- Occupation: Draughtsperson

Gordon McLennan (12 May 1924 – 21 May 2011) was a Scottish political activist and draughtsperson who served as the seventh General Secretary of the Communist Party of Great Britain from 11 March 1975 to January 1990.

== Background ==
Born in Glasgow, McLennan worked as an engineering draughtsperson before taking on various full-time posts within the CPGB. He contested the Glasgow Govan constituency at the 1959 general election (coming last of three candidates, with 4.9%), then the 1962 West Lothian by-election (last of five, with 3.61%), and Glasgow Govan again at the 1964 and 1966 general elections (last of three on both occasions, with 4.41% and 4% respectively).

He became the National Organiser of the CPGB in 1966, and while holding this post, contested elections in St Pancras North at the 1970 and February 1974 general elections, finishing last on both occasions, with 1.67% and 2.41% respectively.

== General Secretary ==
In 1975, McLennan was elected as General Secretary of the Communist Party of Great Britain. He held the post while the party was in terminal decline, with factional infighting within the CPGB, finally stepping down in 1989. One of his acts as General Secretary was to appoint Martin Jacques, then an academic at the University of Bristol, as editor of Marxism Today in 1977.

In November 1982, he attended the State Funeral of Leonid Brezhnev, alongside Foreign Secretary Francis Pym and British Ambassador to the Soviet Union Iain Sutherland.

After the dissolution of the party, in 1991, he joined the Communist Party of Scotland. He remained active in the pensioners' movement and supported the Respect – The Unity Coalition candidate George Galloway at the 2005 general election. He also maintained contact with the Alliance for Green Socialism, one of the successor bodies to the CPGB (via the Green Socialist Network), but although he addressed AGS meetings and wrote for the AGS journal (Green Socialist), he never joined this organisation.

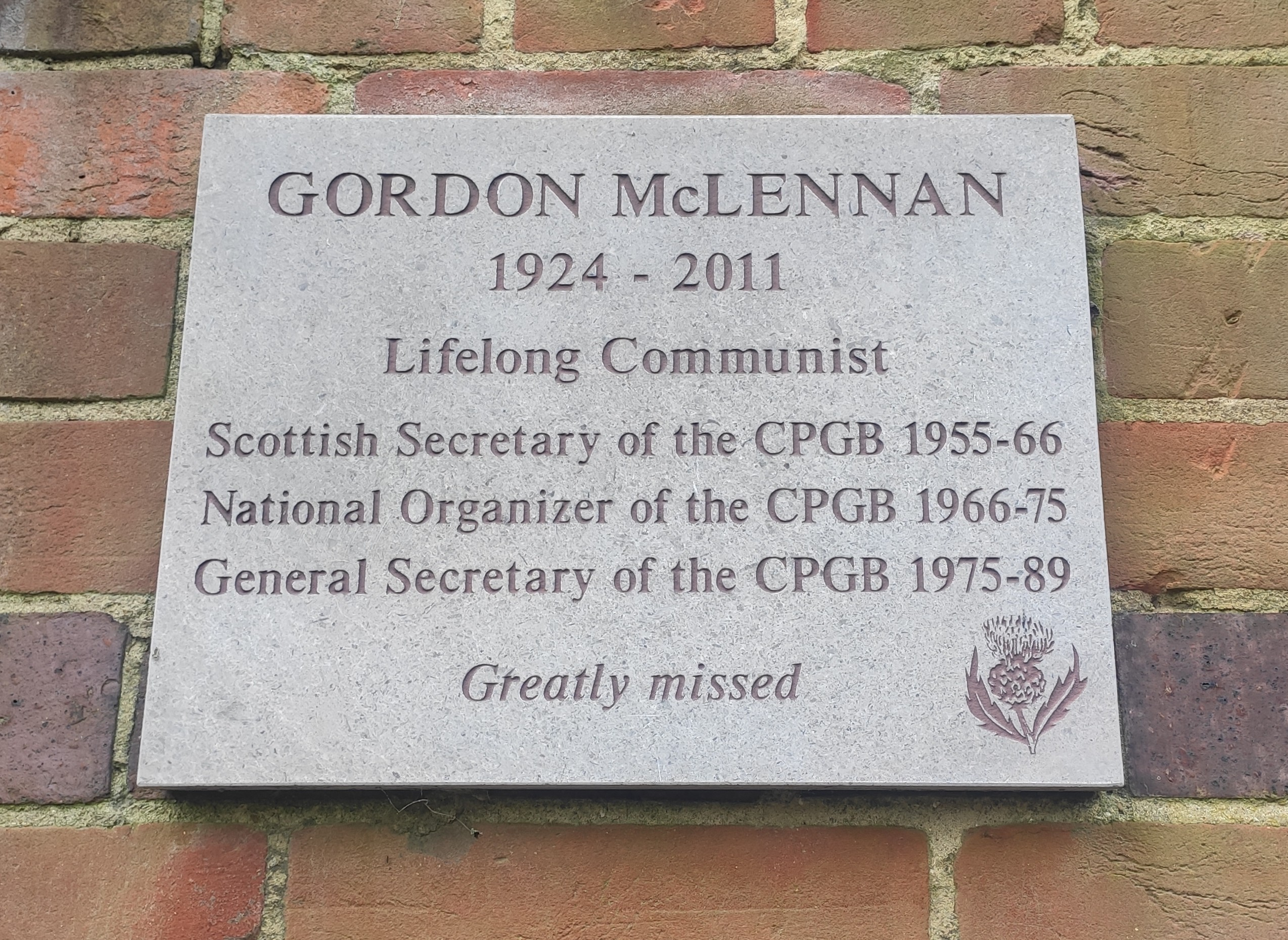
Plaque dedicated to McLennan at Golders Green Crematorium

== Personal life and death ==
McLennan married his wife, Mary, in 1950, and they had four children. He died from cancer in London on 21 May 2011 at the age of 87. He was cremated at Golders Green Crematorium.

== Sources ==
- Hansen, Philip W. (1995). "McLennan, Gordon (1924-)". In A. Thomas Lane (ed.). Biographical Dictionary of European Labor Leaders. Greenwood Publishing Group. p. 599. ISBN 978-0-313-29900-1.

Party political offices
Preceded by Bill Lauchlan	Secretary of the Scottish District of the Communist Party of Great Britain; 1956–1966	Succeeded by Jimmy Reid
Preceded by Bill Lauchlan	National Organiser of the Communist Party of Great Britain; 1966–1975	Succeeded by Dave Cook
Preceded by John Gollan	General Secretary of the Communist Party of Great Britain; 1975–1989	Succeeded by Nina Temple
