= Nicky Wilson =

British trade unionist (born 1950)

Nicky Wilson (born 5 July 1950) is a British trade unionist.

Wilson began working as an electrician at Cardowan Colliery in 1967. He joined the Scottish Colliery Enginemen, Boilermen and Tradesmen Association (SCEBTA), a constituent of the National Union of Mineworkers. During the UK miners' strike of 1984 to 1985, he organised pickets and also ran a soup kitchen for miners. He was arrested at Ravenscraig after some protesters - who he states were not miners themselves - began throwing bottles at vehicles. The case came to court, and he was found not guilty. Cardowan Colliery did not reopen after the strike, and Wilson found himself without work for a period before he was given employment at the Longannet coal mine.

Wilson was elected as secretary of SCEBTA but, due to job losses in the industry, in 1989 it was merged into the Scottish Area of the National Union of Mineworkers. Wilson became general secretary of the Scottish Area and although he lost an election for the post in 1997, he was re-elected in 1999. In 1999, he also became a director of the Coalfields Regeneration Trust.

Wilson lost his job in 2002 as the coal mine he worked at the time was closed, and he instead became a full-time trade unionist. In 2012, he was elected as President of the NUM, after becoming the only candidate to meet the requirements for nomination to the post. This was challenged in court by Stephen Mace, a Yorkshire-based miner who was a supporter of Arthur Scargill, but the tribunal ruled that his election was run correctly.

Trade union offices
Preceded by Eric Clarke	General Secretary of the Scottish Area of the National Union of Mineworkers; 1989 – 1997	Succeeded by ?
Preceded by ?	General Secretary of the Scottish Area of the National Union of Mineworkers; 1999 – present	Succeeded by Incumbent
Preceded by Keith Stanley	Vice President of the National Union of Mineworkers; 2010 – 2012	Succeeded by Wayne Thomas
Preceded by Ian Lavery	President of the National Union of Mineworkers; 2012–present	Succeeded by Incumbent
