= William B. Small (trade unionist) =

Scottish trade unionist

William Balsillie Small (14 February 1872 – 26 February 1944) was a Scottish trade unionist.

Small was the son of William Small, a draper in Blantyre who became a prominent trade union leader, and Jessie Bell Scott. He had a deceased brother of the same name who was born one year before him. William B. Small, as he was generally known, undertook a legal apprenticeship, but then in 1903 followed in his father's footsteps by becoming an agent of the Lanarkshire Miners' County Union (LMCU). His younger brother Robert Small was also appointed as an agent, while another brother, Gladstone Lothian Rosebery, became prominent at the League of Nations.

Small also became active in the Social Democratic Federation (SDF), and during the 1900s was secretary of its Lanarkshire District Council. He was then active in its successor, the British Socialist Party, and stood unsuccessfully for Hamilton School Board as a party member.

In 1918, the secretary of the LMCU, Duncan Macgregor Graham, was elected as a Member of Parliament, and Small became acting general secretary. The following year, he won election as the union's assistant general secretary, then in 1921 he was elected to the executive committee of the National Union of Scottish Mineworkers. In 1922 he was elected as general secretary of the Lanarkshire Miners on a permanent basis. Now seen as being on the right wing of the movement, dissatisfaction with his leadership during the 1926 UK general strike meant that in 1927 he lost a bid for re-election to William Allan, a communist influenced by John Maclean. Small instead returned to the post of assistant general secretary, and was re-elected to the senior post in 1929, serving until about 1937.

In 1937, Small was fined £15 for drunk driving; he claimed that he had not been intoxicated, but admitted to driving without a licence.

Trade union offices
Preceded by Duncan Macgregor Graham	Secretary of the Lanarkshire Miners' County Union; 1922–1927	Succeeded by William Allan
Preceded by William Allan	Secretary of the Lanarkshire Miners' County Union; 1929–1937	Succeeded by James McKendrick
