= West Fife =

Parliamentary constituency in the United Kingdom, 1885–1974

- Former county constituency for the House of Commons
- Subdivision: Fife

1885–1974
- Seats: One
- Created from: Fife
- Replaced by: Central Fife, Dunfermline, Kirkcaldy

West Fife was a parliamentary constituency represented in the House of Commons of the Parliament of the United Kingdom from 1885 to 1974. Along with East Fife, it was formed by dividing the old Fife constituency.

Willie Gallacher of the Communist Party of Great Britain is notable as the longest-serving Member of Parliament (from 1935 to 1950) and the last MP in Parliament (until 1950) for the party.

== Boundaries ==
1885–1918:

1918–1950:

1950–1974: The Burghs of Culross, Leslie, and Markinch; the Districts of Dunfermline, Kirkcaldy, and Lochgelly; and part of the District of Wemyss.

== Members of Parliament ==
Election	Member	Party
1885	Robert Preston Bruce	Liberal
1889	Augustine Birrell	Liberal
1900	John Deans Hope	Liberal
1910	William Adamson	Labour
1931	Charles Milne	Unionist
1935	Willie Gallacher	Communist
1950	Willie Hamilton	Labour
Feb 1974	constituency abolished	

== Elections ==
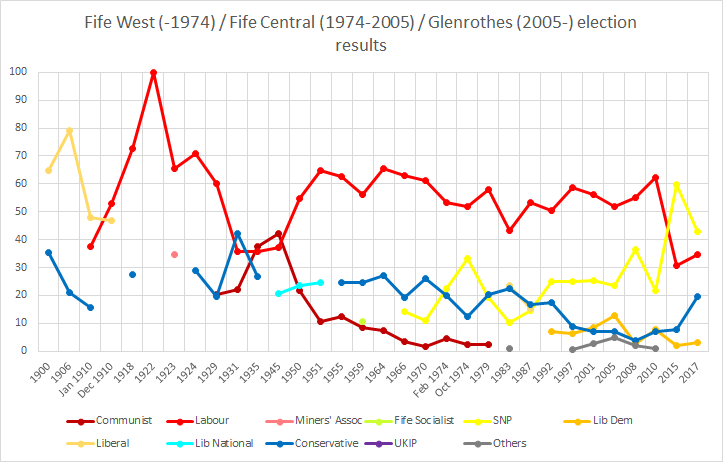
Fife West election results

=== Elections in the 1880s ===
General election 1885: West Fife
Party	Candidate	Votes	%	±%
Liberal	Robert Preston Bruce	Unopposed		
Liberal win (new seat)				

General election 1886: West Fife
Party	Candidate	Votes	%	±%
Liberal	Robert Preston Bruce	Unopposed		
Liberal hold				

Bruce's resignation caused a by-election.

Birrell

By-election, 5 Jul 1889: West Fife
Party	Candidate	Votes	%	±%
Liberal	Augustine Birrell	3,551	56.3	N/A
Liberal Unionist	Rosslyn Wemyss	2,758	43.7	N/A
Majority		793	12.6	N/A
Turnout		6,309	71.6	N/A
Registered electors		8,812		
Liberal hold		Swing	N/A	

=== Elections in the 1890s ===
General election 1892: West Fife
Party	Candidate	Votes	%	±%
Liberal	Augustine Birrell	5,215	76.2	N/A
Liberal Unionist	Robert Yellowlees	1,633	23.8	N/A
Majority		3,582	52.4	N/A
Turnout		6,848	69.9	N/A
Registered electors		9,800		
Liberal hold		Swing	N/A	

General election 1895: West Fife
Party	Candidate	Votes	%	±%
Liberal	Augustine Birrell	4,719	61.4	−14.8
Liberal Unionist	Randolph Wemyss	2,965	38.6	+14.8
Majority		1,754	22.8	−29.6
Turnout		7,684	72.2	+2.3
Registered electors		10,637		
Liberal hold		Swing	-14.8	

=== Elections in the 1900s ===
Hope

General election 1900: West Fife
Party	Candidate	Votes	%	±%
Liberal	John Deans Hope	4,352	64.7	+3.3
Conservative	Gavin William Ralston	2,374	35.3	−3.3
Majority		1,978	29.4	+6.6
Turnout		6,726	60.0	−12.2
Registered electors		11,206		
Liberal hold		Swing	+3.3	

General election 1906: West Fife
Party	Candidate	Votes	%	±%
Liberal	John Deans Hope	6,692	79.0	+14.3
Conservative	Nelson B Constable	1,776	21.0	−14.3
Majority		4,916	58.0	+28.6
Turnout		8,468	55.4	−4.6
Registered electors		15,272		
Liberal hold		Swing	+14.3	

=== Elections in the 1910s ===
General election January 1910: West Fife
Party	Candidate	Votes	%	±%
Liberal	John Deans Hope	6,159	47.8	−31.2
Labour	William Adamson	4,736	37.7	New
Conservative	Gavin William Ralston	1,994	15.5	−5.5
Majority		1,423	10.1	−47.9
Turnout		12,889	73.1	+17.7
Liberal hold		Swing		

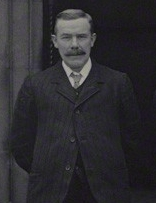
William Adamson

General election December 1910: West Fife
Party	Candidate	Votes	%	±%
Labour	William Adamson	6,128	53.0	+15.3
Liberal	John Deans Hope	5,425	47.0	−0.8
Majority		703	6.0	N/A
Turnout		11,553	61.4	−11.7
Labour gain from Liberal		Swing		

General Election 1914–15:

Another General Election was required to take place before the end of 1915. The political parties had been making preparations for an election to take place and by July 1914, the following candidates had been selected;

- Labour: William Adamson
- Unionist: Joseph Hume Menzies

General election 1918: West Fife
Party		Candidate	Votes	%	±%
	Labour	William Adamson	10,664	72.6	+19.6
C	Unionist	Joseph Hume Menzies	4,020	27.4	New
Majority			6,644	45.2	+39.2
Turnout			14,684	48.2	−13.2
Registered electors			30,452		
	Labour hold		Swing		
C indicates candidate endorsed by the coalition government.

=== Elections in the 1920s ===
General election 1922: West Fife
Party	Candidate	Votes	%	±%
Labour	William Adamson	Unopposed		
Labour hold				

General election 1923: West Fife
Party	Candidate	Votes	%	±%
Labour	William Adamson	12,204	65.4	N/A
Fife, Kinross and Clackmannan Mineworkers' Reform Union	Philip Hodge	6,459	34.6	New
Majority		5,745	30.8	N/A
Turnout		18,663	57.4	N/A
Registered electors		32,491		
Labour hold		Swing	N/A	

General election 1924: West Fife
Party	Candidate	Votes	%	±%
Labour	William Adamson	14,685	70.9	+5.5
Unionist	J MacRobert	6,015	29.1	New
Majority		8,670	41.8	+11.0
Turnout		20,700	63.0	+5.6
Registered electors		32,882		
Labour hold		Swing		

General election 1929: West Fife
Party	Candidate	Votes	%	±%
Labour	William Adamson	17,668	60.0	−10.9
Communist	Willie Gallacher	6,040	20.5	New
Unionist	A.B. Brown	5,727	19.5	−9.6
Majority		11,628	39.5	−2.3
Turnout		29,435	69.7	+6.7
Registered electors		42,252		
Labour hold		Swing	−0.7	

=== Elections in the 1930s ===
General election 1931: West Fife
Party	Candidate	Votes	%	±%
Unionist	Charles Milne	12,977	42.1	+22.6
Labour	William Adamson	11,063	35.8	−24.2
Communist	Willie Gallacher	6,829	22.1	+1.6
Majority		1,914	6.3	N/A
Turnout		30,889	71.4	+1.7
Unionist gain from Labour		Swing		

General election 1935: West Fife
Party	Candidate	Votes	%	±%
Communist	Willie Gallacher	13,462	37.4	+15.4
Labour	William Adamson	12,869	35.7	−0.1
Unionist	Charles Milne	9,667	26.9	−15.2
Majority		593	1.7	N/A
Turnout		35,998	77.8	+6.4
Communist gain from Unionist		Swing		

=== Elections in the 1940s ===
General election 1945: West Fife
Party	Candidate	Votes	%	±%
Communist	Willie Gallacher	17,636	42.1	+4.7
Labour	Willie Hamilton	15,580	37.3	+1.6
Liberal National	Robert Scott Stevenson	8,597	20.6	−6.3
Majority		2,056	4.8	+3.1
Turnout		41,813	75.4	−2.4
Communist hold		Swing		

=== Elections in the 1950s ===
General election 1950: West Fife
Party	Candidate	Votes	%	±%
Labour	Willie Hamilton	23,576	54.8	+17.5
National Liberal	Patrick William Neill Fraser	10,131	23.6	+3.0
Communist	Willie Gallacher	9,301	21.6	−20.5
Majority		13,445	31.2	N/A
Turnout		43,008	84.9	+9.5
Labour gain from Communist		Swing		

General election 1951: West Fife
Party	Candidate	Votes	%	±%
Labour	Willie Hamilton	29,195	64.9	+10.1
National Liberal	John Patterson Fyfe	11,038	24.6	+1.0
Communist	William Lauchlan	4,728	10.5	−11.1
Majority		18,157	40.3	+9.1
Turnout		44,961	85.6	+0.7
Labour hold		Swing		

General election 1955: West Fife
Party	Candidate	Votes	%	±%
Labour	Willie Hamilton	26,849	62.6	−2.3
Unionist	Norman Wylie	10,638	24.8	+0.2
Communist	William Lauchlan	5,389	12.6	+2.1
Majority		16,211	37.8	−2.5
Turnout		42,876	80.3	−5.3
Labour hold		Swing		

General election 1959: West Fife
Party	Candidate	Votes	%	±%
Labour	Willie Hamilton	25,554	56.1	−6.5
Unionist	Alick Buchanan-Smith	11,257	24.7	−0.1
Fife Socialist League	Lawrence Daly	4,886	10.7	New
Communist	William Lauchlan	3,828	8.4	−4.2
Majority		14,297	31.4	−6.4
Turnout		45,525	81.3	+1.0
Labour hold		Swing		

=== Elections in the 1960s ===
General election 1964: West Fife
Party	Candidate	Votes	%	±%
Labour	Willie Hamilton	28,806	65.5	+9.4
Unionist	John B. M. Gall	11,880	27.0	+2.3
Communist	William Lauchlan	3,273	7.5	−0.9
Majority		16,926	38.5	+7.1
Turnout		43,959	78.6	−2.7
Labour hold		Swing		

General election 1966: West Fife
Party	Candidate	Votes	%	±%
Labour	Willie Hamilton	27,123	63.1	−2.4
Conservative	John B. M. Gall	8,300	19.3	−7.7
SNP	Robert R. Patrick	6,046	14.1	New
Communist	Archibald D. MacMillan	1,542	3.6	−3.9
Majority		18,823	43.8	+5.3
Turnout		43,011	76.8	−1.8
Labour hold		Swing		

=== Elections in the 1970s ===
General election 1970: West Fife
Party	Candidate	Votes	%	±%
Labour	Willie Hamilton	29,929	61.1	−2.0
Conservative	Gary McLaughlan	12,837	26.2	+6.9
SNP	Jimmy Halliday	5,386	11.0	−3.1
Communist	Archibald D. MacMillan	855	1.7	−1.9
Majority		17,092	34.9	−8.9
Turnout		49,007	74.2	−2.6
Labour hold		Swing		

== Sources ==
- Election results, 1950 - 1974
- F. W. S. Craig, British Parliamentary Election Results 1918 - 1949
- F. W. S. Craig, British Parliamentary Election Results 1885 - 1918
