= Abe Moffat =

Scottish trade unionist and communist activist (1896–1975)

Portrait of Abe Moffat (1961) by R. Wolstein

Abraham Moffat (24 September 1896 – 28 March 1975) was a Scottish trade unionist and communist activist. He was elected repeatedly to high office in the trade unions and represented the union on government coal boards. He held major union offices: President of the National Union of Scottish Mine Workers; member of the executive committee of the Miners' Federation of Great Britain; Vice-chairman Scottish Regional Coal Board; and member National Coal Board. He served as president of the union from 1942 to his retirement in 1961, when he was succeeded by his younger brother Alex Moffat, also an activist.

Joining the Communist Party of Great Britain (CPGB) in 1922, Abe Moffat was active in a variety of ways. In 1924 he was elected as a communist candidate to the Ballingry Parish Council, serving for 5 years. He was appointed as a full-time official of the United Mineworkers of Scotland, a communist union, becoming its general secretary in 1931. He served until 1935, when the union dissolved. He was also elected to the Central Committee of the CPGB in 1932.

== Early life ==
Moffat was born in 1896 into a Plymouth Brethren family in Lumphinnans in Fife. His family had a long tradition of involvement in mining trade unionism; his grandfather had been a pioneer of the trade union in the Lothians in the 1860s, but was forced to move to Fife due to victimisation.

He left school at the age of fourteen to work at the local coal mine, while spending his spare time competing in middle-distance athletics. He joined the miners' strike of 1912. During World War I he served with the Royal Engineers. He did not become politically active until after the war.

== Rise to prominence ==
Abe and his brother, Alex Moffat, were central to the miners' struggle for economic rights. Many years later, the Central Fife Times and Advertiser reported that "the name Moffat was to become legend throughout the Fife, then Scottish, and ultimately the British mining industry. The Moffat brothers were reported to be in the thick of every struggle to defend and improve the conditions of the miners and their families." Alex and another sibling, David, born seven years apart, were more than just younger brothers to Abe. They were brothers-in-arms, and usually biographies tend to combine them. Being born in Lumphinnans – one of several pit towns dominated at the time by the Communist Party and called 'Little Moscow' by some – they were almost destined to become mine unionists and communists.

Working in the pits for 16 years, Abe Moffat was frequently victimised. He actively supported miners' strike actions.

Moffat was prominent in the 1921 lock-out of miners, and afterwards was blacklisted. He turned to busking until he was able to regain work at the pit. Inspired by John Maclean and Bob Stewart, in 1922 he joined the recently founded Communist Party of Great Britain (CPGB). He helped publish the Buzzer, a newsletter for militant miners at Glencraig Colliery, Lochgelly. In 1924, he was elected for the party to Ballingry Parish Council, holding the seat for five years.

Moffat held office in the Mineworkers' Reform Union, which split from the Fife, Kinross and Clackmannan Mineworkers' Association (FCKMU). It was active in the 1926 miners' strike, and Moffat arranged for the parish council to pay local miners during the dispute. This was illegal, and Moffat was fined £172, but he did not pay and the matter was dropped. However, after the strike, the industry owners did not hire him for twelve years. Although Moffat was unemployed for lengthy periods, he was elected as a checkweighman at Lumphinnans Colliery, also known as Peeweep, in 1928.

Due to his leadership in a dispute over payment systems, Moffat was appointed as a full-time official of the United Mineworkers of Scotland, a communist union. The union was struggling to survive, and Moffat rose quickly to become its general secretary in 1931, serving until it was dissolved in 1935. He was also elected to the Central Committee of the Communist Party of Great Britain (CPGB) in 1932.

== National Union of Scottish Mineworkers ==
The dissolution of the United Mineworkers left Moffat out of work again, but he was elected to Fife County Council in Valleyfield and Blairhall in 1938. Working a few days at the Brucefield mine made him eligible to become a member of the FCKMU. He became his branch delegate to the executive, then in 1940 was elected to the National Union of Scottish Mineworkers' executive.

Two years later, Moffat was elected president of the union, beating Jimmy McKendrick. He used the post to advocate increased output during World War II, and was re-elected in 1944 with a large majority over Hugh Brannan. He held three major union offices: President of the National Union of Scottish Mine Workers; member of the executive committee of the Miners' Federation of Great Britain; Vice-chairman. Scottish Regional Coal Board; member National Coal Board.

In 1943, Moffat met King George VI at a reception at the Gleneagles Hotel. Newspaper reports noted that the two discussed production levels in Scottish mines. On 8 October 1947 Moffat testified at the Whitehaven Explosion Inquiry. (Note: In 1947 at William Pit there was another disaster of similar proportions when 104 men were killed. Four separate explosions over the period 1922–1931 at Haig Pit together killed 83. In 1910 the largest local disaster was at Wellington pit, where 136 miners died. Haig was to become the last pit to operate in Whitehaven.) Moffat was also involved in inquiries into disasters at pits in Knockshinnoch, Kames, Lindsay and Auchengeich. He was known for his passion and grasp of detail at the inquiries, and as a result was nicknamed the "Miners QC".

When the National Union of Mineworkers (NUM) was formed in 1945, Moffat was elected to its executive, serving until his retirement. He stood for the presidency of the NUM in 1954, losing to Ernest Jones. In this period he also assisted Robin Page Arnot with writing his History of the Scottish Miners.

Moffat retired in 1961. He was succeeded as president of the Scottish Mineworkers by his younger brother, Alex. In his later years, Abe Moffat devoted his time to the Scottish Old Age Pensioners' Association until his death in 1975.

Trade union offices
Preceded by David Proudfoot	General Secretary of the United Mineworkers of Scotland; 1931–1936	Union dissolved
Preceded by Andrew Clarke	President of the National Union of Scottish Mine Workers; 1942–1961	Succeeded by Alex Moffat
