= John C. Hendry =

Scottish trade union leader

John C. Hendry (died 25 May 1938) was a Scottish trade union leader.

Born in Brechin, Hendry worked in local textile mills. He became known for his skills in debate and writing, and also found work as a correspondent for several newspapers.

Hendry was a founder member of the Brechin Mill and Factory Operatives' Union, and soon became its general secretary. He served on the Parliamentary Committee of the Scottish Trades Union Congress (STUC) for many years, convening it from 1908 until 1921, and serving as president of the STUC in 1910. He also became secretary of the Scottish Council of Textile Trade Unions, and represented it on the council of the National Association of Unions in the Textile Trade.

The Brechin union merged into the National Union of Textile Workers (NUTW), and Hendry became secretary of its Brechin branch. He remained a high-profile trade unionist, and in 1937 the government appointed him as a representative to a conference on the textile industry held in Washington DC. He died in 1938, while attending the annual conference of the National Union of Dyers, Bleachers and Textile Workers, the successor of the NUTW.

Trade union offices
Preceded by James Gavin	President of the Scottish Trades Union Congress; 1910	Succeeded by James Brown
