= Mid and East Lothian Miners' Association =

Scottish trade union

The Mid and East Lothian Miners' Association (MELMA) was a trade union representing coal miners in parts of the Lothian area of Scotland.

The union described itself as having been founded in 1873 under the leadership of David Moffat, but it disbanded the next year after an unsuccessful strike. Moffat had to relocate to Fife due to victimisation for union activism.

The union was re-established in 1887 by George Young and Robert Brown. MELMA officially registered in 1889, by which time it had a membership of about 2,000 workers.

In 1894, MELMA was one of the constituent unions in the founding of the Scottish Miners' Federation, and played a leading role in that year's miners strike in Scotland. Other major strikes involving MELMA workers took place in 1912 and 1921.

In 1945, the Mid and East Lothian Miners' Association merged with several other unions to represent the Stirling and Lothians Area of the National Union of Mineworkers.

== General Secretaries ==
1890: Robert Brown
1917: Joseph Young
1919: Andrew Clarke
1940: Alexander Cameron

== Presidents ==
1889: William Shaw
1900: George Young
1912: Andrew Clarke
1918: James Ormiston
