= Willie Gallacher (politician) =

Scottish trade unionist, activist and communist (1881–1965)

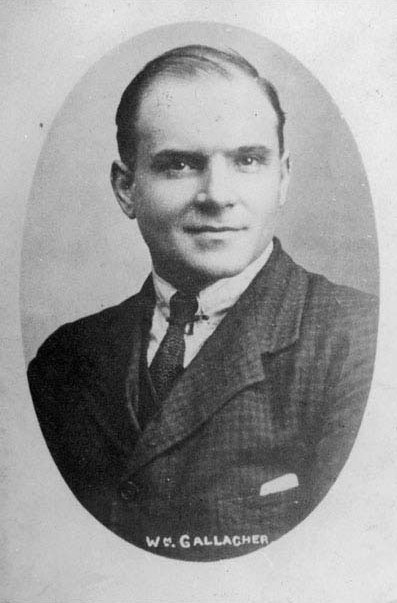
- Gallacher in 1919

Member of Parliament for West Fife
- In office 14 November 1935 – 23 February 1950
- Preceded by: Charles Milne
- Succeeded by: Willie Hamilton

Personal details
- Born: 25 December 1881 Paisley, Renfrewshire, Scotland
- Died: 12 August 1965 (aged 83) Paisley, Renfrewshire, Scotland
- Party: Communist Party of Great Britain (from 1921)
- Other political affiliations: Independent Labour Party; Social Democratic Federation; Communist Labour Party (until 1921)
- Willie Gallacher's voice Gallacher giving a victory speech following his election in West Fife; Recorded 1 December 1935

William Gallacher (25 December 1881 – 12 August 1965) was a Scottish trade unionist, activist and communist. He was one of the leading figures of the Shop Stewards' Movement in wartime Glasgow (the 'Red Clydeside' period) and a founding member of the Communist Party of Great Britain. He served two terms in the House of Commons as one of the last Communist Members of Parliament.

== Early career ==
Gallacher was born in Paisley, Scotland, on 25 December 1881, the son of an Irish father and a Scottish mother. His father died when he was seven years old, and one of his earliest ambitions was to earn enough money so that his mother would no longer have to work as a washerwoman. With his sisters, he finally achieved that goal at the age of 19, but his mother died shortly afterwards at the age of 54.

He began working at 10 years old, and left school at 12. After a spell as a delivery boy for a grocer, where he had his first dispute with an employer, he found work in a sanitary engineering workshop. He later had a spell as a steward on some transatlantic crossings before he began work at Albion Motor Works, Glasgow, in 1912. After spending 1913 in the United States to visit his sisters in Chicago, he erected scaffolding in Belfast. Returning to Glasgow, he again found work at Albion Motor Works in 1914, just before the First World War broke out.

The "weakness for alcohol" shown by his father and elder brother, and the suffering that it caused his mother, led him to become involved with the Temperance movement in his mid-adolescence. However, on discovering that colleagues had canvassed support for a director of a Trust Public House in the 1906 general election, Gallacher ended his association with the organised Temperance movement. He remained a lifelong teetotaller.

A subsequent period as a member of the Independent Labour Party ended quickly, and he joined the Social Democratic Federation, which brought him into contact with John MacLean. In common with many socialists in mid-west Scotland, Gallacher was greatly influenced by MacLean though they were later to have an acrimonious falling out. The Paisley branch of the SDF introduced him to John Ross Campbell, who would also become a prominent British Communist and the editor of the Daily Worker from 1949 to 1959.

== Wartime activities ==
Gallacher was opposed to British involvement in World War I. He was Chairman of the Clyde Workers' Committee, an organisation that was formed to organise Clydeside workers and, in particular, to campaign against the Munitions of War Act 1915, which forbade engineers to leave the works in which they were employed. David Lloyd George and Arthur Henderson met Gallacher and the Clyde Workers' Committee in Glasgow, but they were unwilling to back down on the issue. In 1916, the Clyde Workers' Committee journal, The Worker, was prosecuted under the Defence of the Realm Act 1914 for an article criticising the war. Gallacher and the editor John Muir were both found guilty and sent to prison, Gallacher for six months and Muir for one year.

== 40 Hours Movement ==
After the war, Gallacher was involved in the struggle for improving workers' conditions. It was widely expected that the end of the war would be followed by widespread unemployment because of the re-entry of large numbers of demobilised soldiers and seamen into the workforce. Glasgow was expected to be particularly badly affected because a large proportion of its workforce was employed in war-related areas such as munitions and shipbuilding, which would suddenly contract with the end of the war. Gallacher and the Clyde Workers' Committee proposed a campaign to limit working hours to thirty hours per week, which was altered to forty hours per week after the Glasgow Trades Council became involved. In January 1919, the CWC and Trades Council launched a mass strike in support of the demand for a 40-hour working week.

During a rally of about 25,000 striking workers at George Square, Glasgow, on 31 January 1919, some of the strikers tried to stop the trams in the square, as the tram workers had refused to strike. This led to conflict between police and strikers and led to a riot (see Battle of George Square). As the violence spread through the city and fearing the under-strength Glasgow police were losing control of the situation, the Sheriff of Lanarkshire called for military aid. Although revolution was the furthest thing from the minds of the trade union leaders of the day, Gallacher later claimed that they should have marched to the barracks in the Maryhill district of the city and encouraged the Scottish troops there to leave them and join the workers against the government. The union leaders of the strike were arrested and charged with "instigating and inciting large crowds of persons to form part of a riotous mob". Gallacher was sentenced to three months, along with Manny Shinwell, who was sentenced to five months.

== Political career ==
In 1920, Gallacher became a leading figure of the Communist Labour Party. He led the grouping into the Communist Party of Great Britain (CPGB) and stood for election to the House of Commons at Dundee (both in 1922 and 1923), West Fife (1929 and 1931) and Shipley (1930). He was eventually elected to represent the West Fife constituency at the 1935 general election.

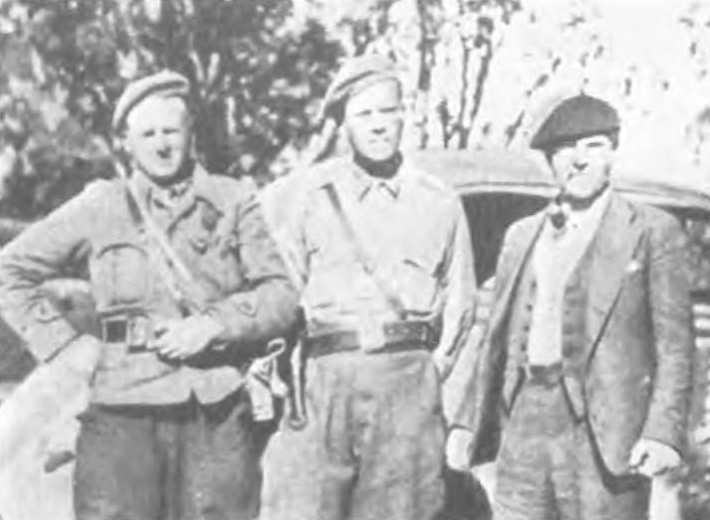
Gallacher (right) with Bert Williams and Allan Johnson in Spain, 1937

In 1925, Gallacher was one of twelve members of the Communist Party convicted at the Old Bailey under the Incitement to Mutiny Act 1797, and one of the five defendants sentenced to twelve months' imprisonment. In 1936, Gallacher supported the views of members of the Labour Party such as Stafford Cripps and Aneurin Bevan, who were arguing in favour of giving military assistance to the Spanish Popular Front government fighting against Francisco Franco's Nationalist forces in the Spanish Civil War. He criticized appeasement and attacked the National Government for considering inviting Hermann Göring to London.

Gallacher lost his West Fife seat to the Labour Party at the 1950 general election, coming third behind the National Liberal candidate. He remained politically active serving as President of the CPGB from 1956 to 1963. In an article published in the party's Labour Monthly in April 1953 he appraised the career of Joseph Stalin; the Soviet First Secretary had died the previous month, concluding with the assertion that "his life ended with his work completed, for the Party and the Soviet people still under his wise guidance will go forward, resolute as he was resolute—to the new truly free society of Marx and Engels, of Lenin and of Stalin".

Gallacher died in Paisley on 12 August 1965, aged 83.

== Works ==
Gallacher was the author of several books, including The Case for Communism (1949), his autobiography, The Chosen Few (1940), and The Tyrant's Might is Passing (1954). He also wrote a book about his experiences during the First World War, Revolt on the Clyde (1936), and The Last Memoirs of William Gallacher (1966).

== Sources ==
- Gallacher, William (1978) [1936]. Revolt on the Clyde: An autobiography (4th ed.). London: Lawrence and Wishart. ISBN 978-0-85315-425-9. OCLC 4740566.

Parliament of the United Kingdom
Preceded by Charles Black Milne	Member of Parliament for West Fife; 1935–1950	Succeeded by Willie Hamilton
