= William Small (trade unionist) =

Scottish trade unionist

William Small (1845 – 23 January 1903) was a Scottish trade unionist.

== Early life ==
In his younger years, Small ran a drapers' shop in Glasgow, then moved his business to Cambuslang, and finally to Blantyre. There, he became involved in the land reform movement.

== Trade unionism in the 1880s ==
Alexander Macdonald had been the leading miners' trade union organiser in Lanarkshire. He died in 1881, and Andrew McCowie, who had met Small through the land reform movement, believed that Small would be McDonald's ideal successor. Small's draper business was not going well, and he was persuaded, devoting the remainder of his life to the cause. In 1885, he worked with older activists such as Robert Steel to call meetings of miners in Lanarkshire with a view to founding a branch of the Lanarkshire Miners' Union. Among those who attended was Robert Smillie, who regarded Small as an early mentor. Smillie noted that Small would rise early in the morning to walk to meetings as much as twenty miles away, and in summer would often sleep outdoors to avoid having to complete the return journey the same day.

The union was led by Keir Hardie, with Small succeeding as secretary in 1885. He led the union in supporting Hardie's campaign at the 1888 Mid Lanarkshire by-election, and Small chaired many of Hardie's campaign meetings. Small also attended UK-wide miners' conferences in 1886 and 1889.

== Politics ==
Small's politics gradually moved towards socialism, and his cottage became a centre for discussions between leading socialist activists, including William Morris, Henry Hyndman and Edward Carpenter. Small joined Hardie's Scottish Labour Party, eventually becoming a vice-president, and was considered as a potential candidate in Dundee at the 1892 general election, though he was not ultimately selected. He attended the 1892 and 1893 Trades Union Congresses; at the first, he and Smillie jointly proposed nationalising the mines and also mineral rights.

The county union appears to have dissolved around 1890, but several local miners unions were established in the county, Small leading the Blantyre Miners' Trade Union. In 1896, this became part of a new Lanarkshire Miners' County Union.

In 1893, Small was a founder member of the Independent Labour Party, serving on its first National Administrative Council. In 1894, he was selected as its candidate for one of the seats in Edinburgh at the next general election, but he withdrew before the contest. He remained close to Smillie, and would accompany him on trips to London; Smillie would attend meetings, while Small would conduct research on Scottish mining law at the British Library.

== Later years ==
Small was less central to mining trade unionism by the turn of the century, devoting some of his time to an elected post on Blantyre's School Board. Although he remained in good health, he died suddenly in January 1903. Two of his sons followed him into trade unionism: Robert became secretary of the Scottish Shale Miners in 1912, while William B. became secretary of the Lanarkshire Miners in the 1920s. A younger son, Gladstone Lothian Rosebery, attended the University of Glasgow and stood unsuccessfully as a Labour Party candidate for Parliament.
