= Fife and Kinross Miners' Association =

Scottish trade union

The Fife and Kinross Miners' Association was a coal miners' trade union based in Fife and Kinross-shire in Scotland.

== History ==
The union was founded in 1869 or 1870, and proved immediately successful by achieving the eight-hour day for miners in the counties, and was the first union to be recognised by Scottish mine owners. In 1877, employers organised a lockout, targeting the union, but alone out of Scottish coal miners' unions, it survived. The union was a strong supporter of the 1893 United Kingdom miners' strike, even publishing a list of strikebreakers in the county.

In 1894, the association became a founding member of the Scottish Miners Federation, which in turn affiliated to the Miners' Federation of Great Britain (MFGB). By 1907, it had 15,500 members.

In 1922, the FKMA merged with the Clackmannan Miners' Association, forming the Fife, Kinross and Clackmannan Miners' Association (FKCMA).

The new union suffered several splits. The Independent Labour Party-aligned Miners' Reform Union of Fife, Kinross and Clackmannan left almost immediately, led by Philip Hodge. This union survived through the 1926 UK general strike, following which William Adamson was persuaded that it should be permitted to merge back into the FKCMA. However, Hodge was elected General Secretary in 1928, and Adamson left to found the right-wing Fife, Clackmannan, and Kinross Miners' Union, which subsequently was recognised as the official union by the National Union of Scottish Mineworkers and Miners' Federation of Great Britain.

The rump union soon disappeared, with supporters of the Communist Party of Great Britain forming the United Mineworkers of Scotland, and those in favour of a non-political union forming the "Fife, Kinross and District Industrial Trade Union". The United Mineworkers was the more successful, with its membership peaking at roughly half of the FCKMU.

In 1944, the MFGB became the National Union of Mineworkers, and the FKCMA became its Fife Area, with less independence than before. It was later merged with the Stirlingshire Area to become the "Fife, Clackmannan and Stirlingshire Area".

== General Secretaries ==
=== Original union ===
1869: Henry Cook
1881: John Weir
1908: William Adamson
1917: James Cook
1928: Philip Hodge

=== Adamson union ===
1928: William Adamson
1936: James Cook
1944: James Potter
1946: John McArthur
1956: Bill McLean
1963: Lawrence Daly
1965:
