= Lanarkshire Miners' County Union =

The Lanarkshire Miners' County Union, later the Lanarkshire Mineworkers' Union, represented coal miners in the Lanarkshire district of Scotland.

The union was founded in 1893 as the Lanarkshire Miners' Federation, bringing together local miners' unions based in Bellshill, Blantyre, Hamilton, Larkhall, and elsewhere. In 1896, the local unions merged completely to form a unitary trade union, the "Lanarkshire Miners' County Union".

The members of the early federation were:

| Union | Founded | Members (year) |
|---|---|---|
| Bellshill Miners' Association | 1890 | |
| Blantyre Miners' Association | 1890 | |
| Hamilton Miners' Association | Unknown | 1,200 (1894) |
| Holytown Miners' Association | 1894 | |
| Larkhall Miners' Mutual Protection Association | | |
| Motherwell Miners' Association | 1894 | |
| Shotts Miners' Association | 1894 | |

The union was initially led by Robert Smillie and William Small, both close associates of Keir Hardie, and both were founding members of the Independent Labour Party. In the 1920s, the two leading officials were Andrew McAnulty and William Allan, both members of the Communist Party of Great Britain. However, they were both suspended in 1928, and left to found the rival United Mineworkers of Scotland the following year.

The union affiliated to the National Union of Scottish Mineworkers, which in turn became an affiliate of the Miners' Federation of Great Britain (MFGB). In 1944, the MFGB became the National Union of Mineworkers, and the County Union became its Lanarkshire Area, with less independence than before. In about 1962, it was dissolved into the Scottish Area.

== Presidents ==
1893: Robert Smillie
1900s: Joseph Sullivan
1920: Andrew McAnulty
1929: Alexander Hunter
1940: William Pearson

== Secretaries ==
1893: William Small
c.1896: David Gilmour
1918: Duncan Macgregor Graham
1922: William B. Small
1927: William Allan
1929: William B. Small
1937: James McKendrick
