= National Union of Scottish Mineworkers =

- Founded: 1894
- Dissolved: 2018
- Headquarters: Culross, Fife
- Location: Scotland
- Members: 67,200 (1907); 35 (2014)
- Key people: Nicky Wilson (Secretary and President)
- Publication: Scottish Miner
- Parent organization: MFGB (1894–1944); National Union of Mineworkers (1945–2018)
- Website: www.num.org.uk

The National Union of Scottish Mineworkers (NUSW) is a trade union in Scotland, founded in 1894 as the Scottish Miners Federation. It joined the Miners' Federation of Great Britain, and in 1914 changed its name to National Union of Scottish Mineworkers. It survives as the National Union of Mineworkers (Scotland Area).

During the 1920s and 1930s the union was strongly affected by socialist and communist leadership as its members fought for better wages and living conditions. During World War II, they strongly supported government with increased production from the mines. In 1944 with the establishment of the National Union of Mineworkers, the NUSM became its "Scottish Area," with less autonomy. In the late 20th century, the mining industry declined dramatically in Scotland and across Great Britain, putting thousands of men out of work.

== Forerunners ==
There had been several attempts to form a national union of miners in Scotland. The Scottish Coal and Iron Miners' Association, formed in 1855, organised a strike of 30,000 miners against a reduction in their wages, but the dispute was lost and the union dissolved soon after. The Scottish Coal and Iron-stone Miners' Protective Association was also formed in 1855 by various local unions, and was led by Alexander Macdonald; although this was also badly affected by the lost strike, it survived to reform as the Scottish Miners' Amalgamated Society in 1859, but achieved little as each union acted separately, and dissolved in 1863, by which time it had only 1,500 members.

The Scottish Miners' Association was formed in 1872, with MacDonald as its secretary and treasurer. It worked closely with the Miners' National Union in England and Wales, and found immediate success, almost tripling pay while also reducing the output of the coal mines. However, a major strike from May to June 1874 used up all the union's reserve funds, and it thereafter achieved little. It went bankrupt in 1882, due to a strike begun in the previous year.

In 1886, Keir Hardie founded the Scottish Miners' National Federation. This was based on the Ayrshire Miners' Union, but initially had a total of 23,570 members in 26 districts. Hardie became its secretary and, through it newspaper, The Miner, he campaigned for the nationalisation of the coal mines, a minimum wage and a five-day week. Although its membership dropped rapidly, forcing it to dissolve in 1888, several of its districts survived as independent unions.

== History ==
The union was founded in 1894, as the Scottish Miners Federation (SMF). It initially brought together seven county unions, with others joining soon after. It initially had 35,900 members.

The unions which constituted the early federation were:

Union	Founded	Affiliated	Members (1907)
Amalgamated Miners and Manual Workers Union	1886	1894	3,200
Ayrshire Miners' Federal Union	1886	1894	9,500
Clackmannan Miners' Association	1887	1894	1,183
Fife and Kinross Miners' Association	1869	1894	15,500
Kirkintilloch and Twechar Miners' Association	1893		700
Lanarkshire Miners' Federation	1893	1894	34,000
Mid and East Lothian Miners' Association	1887	1894	6,750
Scottish Shale Miners and Manual Workers' Union	1886	1890s	1,200
Stirlingshire, Forth and Clyde Valley Miners' Association	1886	1894	6,000

The union immediately organised a strike for better pay and conditions. It also joined the Miners' Federation of Great Britain, and this led to conflict. The SMF president, Robert Smillie, agreed to follow English unions in accepting wage reductions, against the wishes of secretary Chisholm Robertson and leading activist Shaw Maxwell.

Although the early strike was lost, the federation continued, with membership reduced to under 16,000, and particularly few members in Lanarkshire. However, by the end of the decade it had regained members and, as coal prices rose, the union was able to win more of its demands. The SMF became known as a strong supporter of socialism.

By 1914, membership had risen to around 82,000, with half in Lanarkshire, one quarter in Fife and Kinross, an eighth in Ayrshire, and most of the remainder in Mid and East Lothian. The union adopted a new structure, with less autonomy for its affiliates, and was renamed the "National Union of Scottish Mineworkers". In 1929, a group of left-wingers, mostly linked with the Communist Party of Great Britain, left to form the rival United Mineworkers of Scotland. This initially saw some success, but they rejoined in 1936.

In 1944, the MFGB became the National Union of Mineworkers. The NUSW became its Scottish Area, with less autonomy than before.

By 2014, the union had only 35 members remaining. It was dissolved in 2018.

== Secretaries ==
1894: Chisholm Robertson
1896?: Robert Brown
1917: James Brown
1918: Robert Smith
1927: William Allan
1929: Robert Smith
1934: James Brown
1936: Alexander Sloan
1940: James Cook
1945: William Pearson
1956: John Wood
1965: Lawrence Daly
1969: Bill McLean
1977: Eric Clarke
1989: Nicky Wilson

== Presidents ==
1894: Robert Smillie
1918: John Robertson
1920: Hugh Murnin
1922: Robert Smillie
1929: James Doonan
1932: Andrew Clarke
1942: Abe Moffat
1961: Alex Moffat
1967: Mick McGahey
1987: George Bolton
