= Mary Snodgrass =

Mary Snodgrass may refer to:

- Mary Anderson Snodgrass (1862–1945), Scottish politician, suffragist, and advocate for women's rights
- Mary Ellen Snodgrass (born 1944), American author
