= Grace Paterson =

Scottish suffragist (1843–1925)

- Born: 1843; Glasgow
- Died: 1925 (aged 81–82); Edinburgh
- Known for: School board member, temperance activist, suffragist, and founder of the Glasgow School of Cookery
- Parent(s): Georgina Smith and William Paterson

Grace Chalmers Paterson was a campaigner, suffragist, temperance activist and educationalist.

== Early life ==
Paterson was born in Glasgow to Georgina Smith and William Paterson, a merchant.

== Domestic education ==
She campaigned for the improvement of domestic education for working class girls. She was a friend and supporter of Janet Galloway and Christian Guthrie Wright, founder of the Edinburgh School of Cookery.

She was one of the first women elected to a school board in Glasgow, in 1885., on which she served for more than twenty years.

In 1895, Paterson was Convener of the board's Industrial Committee, with an attendance of more than six hundred at the evening classes she organised

She also founded the Glasgow school of cookery, alongside Margaret Black. She was the "driving force" behind this institution. She was involved in the temperance movement in Scotland.

== Women's Suffrage ==
She was a founder member of the Glasgow and West of Scotland Association for Women's Suffrage. She joined the WSPU in 1907. Paterson was involved in a two and a half mile long suffrage march in Edinburgh in 1907. The Ladies Field journal listed her as one of the "Glasgow Brigade", along with Helen Fraser. Margaret Irwin and Teresa Billington-Greig. In 1911, Paterson attended a meeting of the Women's Freedom League in the Charing Cross Hall to hear Princess Bariatinsky. who said that no "cultured man" or "intellectual" would argue against votes for women. In 1912, the newspaper "Votes for women" listed her as one of two "Joint Organising Secretaries"

== Further Information ==
In 1901, Paterson was one of the twelve members of the "Citizen Council" presiding over the Glasgow International Exhibition. Others included Sir David Richmond, Sir John Muir, Sir Charles Tennant and Sir William Arrol. Paterson had also been involved with the 1888 International Exhibition of Industries, Science and Art as Secretary of the Exhibition Committee.

== Obituary ==
According to her biography on the Glasgow Caledonian University Archives website, Paterson's obituary in the Glasgow Herald said she was "a convinced and active suffragist, she also believed in women and their capacity both of original work and for organising and directing the work of others. She desired for women equal pay and equal moral standards, and her friendly interest was warmly appreciated by women in the teaching profession"
