= Glasgow Magdalene Institution =

Asylum in Glasgow, Scotland

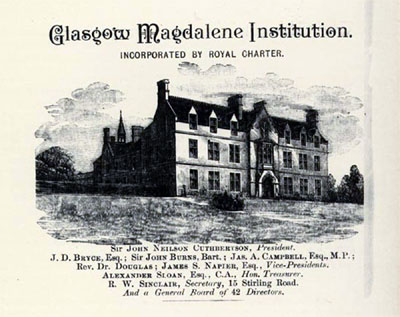
Glasgow Magdalene Institution c 1890

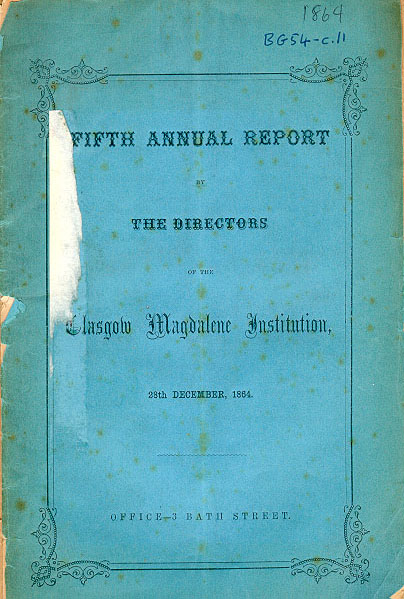
Fifth Annual Report of the Directors of the Glasgow Magdalene Institution

The Glasgow Magdalene Institution (Glasgow’s Magdalene Institution for the Repression of Vice and Rehabilitation of Penitent Females was its official name) was an asylum in Glasgow, Scotland, initially started in 1812 and was open until 1958.

The institution was started in response to the increasing worries of prostitution, the spread of venereal disease and wavering moral values seen in the country, and sought to "rescue" women or girls who were deemed "prostitutes" and teach them how to support themselves through industrial training mainly through the laundries.

== History of the Institution ==
With its establishment in 1812 it had originated on Parliamentary Road until it moved to Lochburn Home in 1864 where it remained until its closure. It was non-denominational and was funded by voluntary subscriptions – as well as the income generated from being a working laundry. The women in the asylum were generally termed as prostitutes, however, this term was used in a very loose manner encompassing not only women who sold sex for money but also single mothers, socialists, mill girls and girls dressed "immorally."

In Glasgow, the Magdalene Asylum evolved into the Magdalene Institution with a new Glasgow System created to deal with court appearance of women who refused to be checked for venereal diseases by policemen. The Glasgow Lock Hospital was set up in Rottenrow Lane in 1805 to treat women with venereal disease. Meanwhile, the Magdalene Institute took women who were free from syphilis, not pregnant, to be newly ‘fallen’ and willing to submit to discipline.

The Glasgow SystemFanette PRADON, Le Système de Glasgow, 2023 https://theses.hal.science/tel-04412749, as it became known, saw unprecedented collusion between the local constabulary and the medical authorities. Women under suspicion could be forced to undergo an intimate examination by male police officers; if they showed signs of venereal disease they would be incarcerated in the Lock Hospital without a time limit. Many were never released. The Glasgow system was deemed so successful it was adopted by several cities across Britain. The Lock Hospital did not close until 1950.

The fifth annual report of the Magdalene Institute, written in 1864, said it was of "profound regret an of painful surprise" that the "resorts of profligacy should so much abound" in both Glasgow and Scotland. In Glasgow, wayward girls were placed at the Magdalene Institute by parents or probation officers until 1958.

== Reactions towards the Institution ==
Reactions to the Institution varied over time.

An advertisement in 1888 claimed: "nearly 5,000 young women have shared more or less in the benefits of the Institution since 1859. During the same period no fewer than 1,080 young women have been restored to parents or friends, and 942 have been placed in domestic service or other respectable employment, while thirty-two were sent abroad, thus making 2,054 who have been rescued from a life of shame and restored to society, after having received the usual education and training in the Homes".

The Institution went unchecked until 1958 – when it was closed down – after the inmates staged a "riot" amid claims of abuse and ill treatment. The girls were all aged between 15 and 19 years of age and none had been convicted of a criminal offence. Despite this police all over the city were hunting for them and newspaper reports called on the public to be vigilant and look out for the girls, distinctive in their blue dresses and white aprons. Each time the girls were rounded up they staged another breakout, some escaping down the fire escape; others staged a rooftop protest. They vowed to keep escaping until their voices were heard. The "riot" lasted for three days. The final breakout occurred during a visit by officials from the Scottish Home Department who were investigating the series of events. There was an official inquiry into their claims of beatings, bullying and verbal abuse; as of March 2017 no one has been held accountable.

== Other Magdalene Institutions in Scotland, and beyond ==
At their height the Magdalene Asylums, which were run around the world, had 20 refuges in Scotland.

The first in Edinburgh opened in 1797. In the capital, the charitable organisation, funded by church collections and private donations, opened in the Canongate in the Old Town, a popular location for street prostitutes. In the early 1800s, there were around 200 brothels in Edinburgh. The Magdalene Asylum was "sharply segregated place", according to Scot-Pep, a sex workers' rights organisation based in Edinburgh, with prostitutes kept away from those women of a "better order". Women were kept in solitary confinement for the first three months "to eradicate the taint of moral contagion".

One resident of the Edinburgh asylum, Mary Paterson, (originally from Glasgow) was murdered by Burke and Hare shortly after leaving the institution on 8 April 1828.

In Ireland, the Magdalene Asylums, or Magdalene Laundries, were usually run by Roman Catholic orders and different to the Scottish system. A scandal broke in 1993 after a mass grave containing 155 corpses was found in the convent grounds of one of the laundries in Dublin. A formal state apology was issued in 2013 and a £50 million compensation scheme for survivors of abuse was set up.

== The Glasgow Magdalene Institution and popular culture ==
The Glasgow Magdalene Institution has inspired popular culture through a novel like Penance by Theresa Talbot that was published in October 2015. It is a crime fiction novel based on the Glasgow Magdalene Institution. Theresa Talbot was born and raised in Glasgow to Irish parents and has always had an awareness of the Magdalene Institution. Through initial research for a radio series with the BBC, she began to develop the inspiration and story for her novel. She based the novel as a crime narrative through dramatic licenses to give the women of the Glasgow Magdalene Institution a voice.
