= Donna Mansell =

British double heart transplant recipient

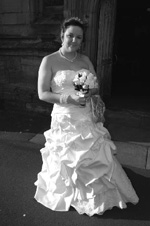
- Donna Mansell on her wedding day
- Born: Donna Louise Davidson; 14 July 1983; Kidderminster, United Kingdom
- Died: 2 July 2010 (aged 26); Worcester, United Kingdom
- Other names: Donna Louise Mansell
- Occupation: Carer for people with brain related injuries prior to illness
- Spouse: Aaran Mansell (m. 2010–2010)
- Website: Official website

Donna Mansell (/ˈmænsəl/; 1983–2010) is a double heart transplant recipient who has inspired a campaign for Organ Donation education as well as counselling others in a similar situation from her hospital bed. Donna also promoted organ donation through media and charity events and was also the figurehead for the British Heart Foundation's Christmas fundraising drive. Donna's Campaign has been continued by her husband Aaran Mansell after her unfortunate death in July 2010.

== Early life ==
Donna Louise Davidson was born on 14 July 1983 in Kidderminster, United Kingdom and led a fairly normal childhood until she reached the age of 19. After being pregnant with her daughter Leonie for 33 weeks doctors soon realised that Donna had developed Dilated cardiomyopathy. Leonie was delivered by Caesarean section on 9 August 2002 while Donna was treated for heart failure. After 12 weeks of treatment was not successful, doctors realised that a heart transplant was the only option and on 2 November 2002 Donna received her first heart transplant at the Queen Elizabeth Hospital Birmingham. After her transplant Donna developed Transplant rejection a number of times requiring various hospital stays. Eventually doctors gained control and Donna continued her life until December 2004 when her brother James was diagnosed with cardiomyopathy and listed for a transplant. James received his heart transplant shortly after.

In April 2005 Donna started to feel short of breath and could barely walk. She was diagnosed with Chronic Organ rejection and her body had developed donor specific antibodies which were attacking her heart. This resulted in Donna being listed for another transplant as there was nothing that could be done to save this heart. Four months later Donna received heart transplant number two. In 2007 James died due to transplant complications which hit Donna hard as they had grown very close due to their illnesses. Shortly after Donna received the news that her daughter, Leonie, had also been diagnosed with Dilated cardiomyopathy. They also added that there was a fault in the TNNT2 Gene which was the cause of all their heart related problems.

== Marriage ==
In July 2008 Donna met Aaran Mansell and in February 2010 Donna and Aaran married at St Mary & All Saints church in Kidderminster where James's funeral had taken place a few years before.

== Donnas Dream Campaign ==
Donnas Dream is a campaign for more people to sign the organ donor register in the UK. It is run by Aaran Mansell in memory of and inspired by Donna Mansell in order to raise the amount of donor organs available for Organ Donation and ultimately Transplant
