= Glasgow and West of Scotland Association for Women's Suffrage =

Glasgow based women's suffrage association

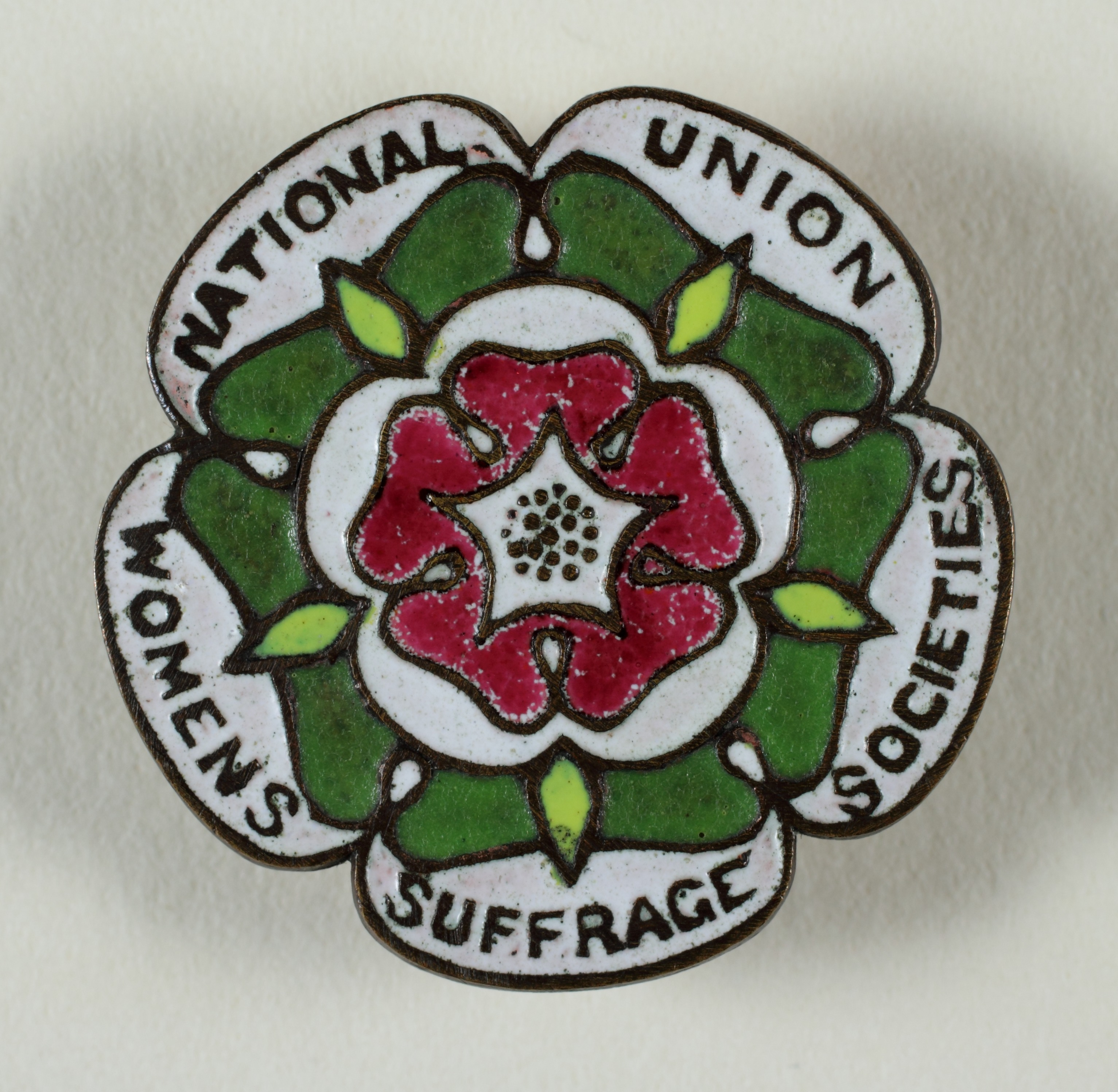
Suffrage Campaigning- National Union of Women's Suffrage Societies (NUWSS)1908-1918 (23070340306)

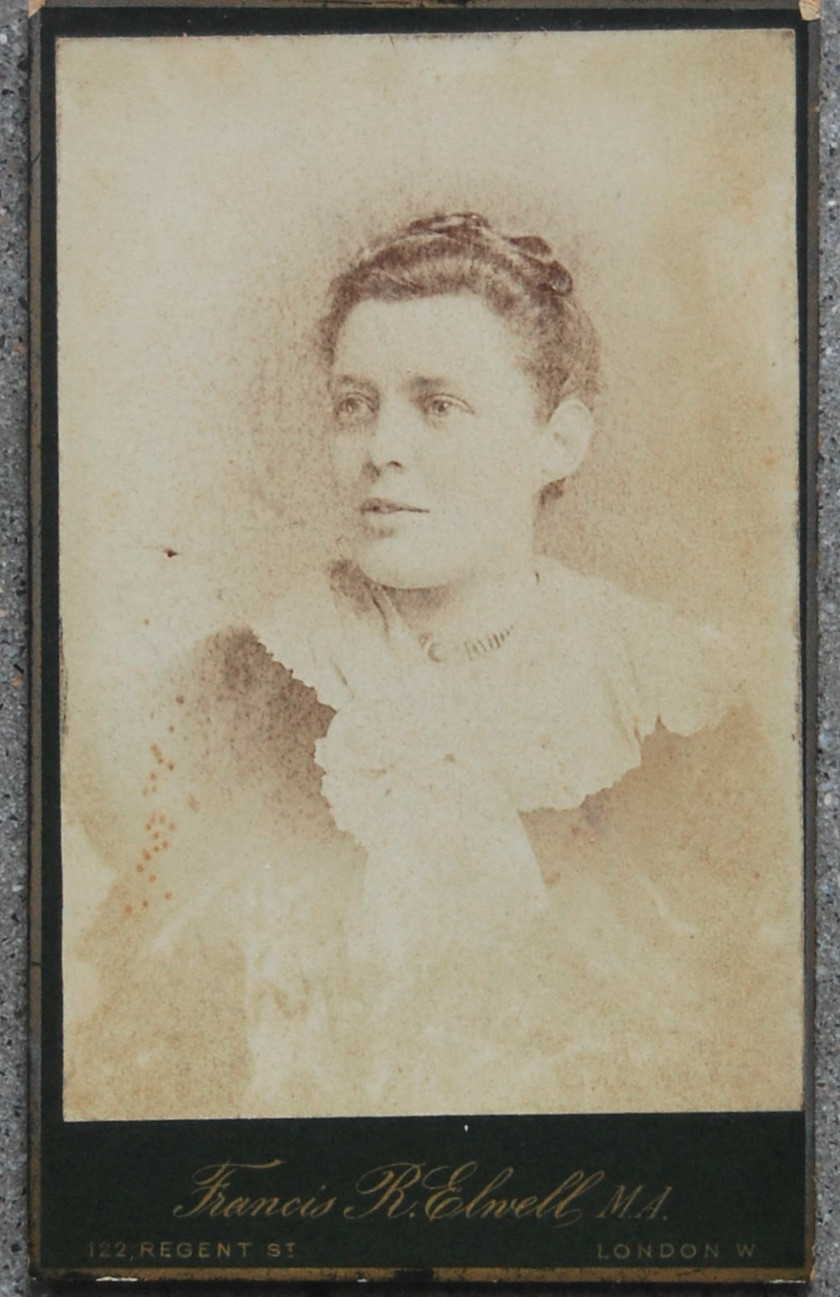
Dr Elizabeth Pace

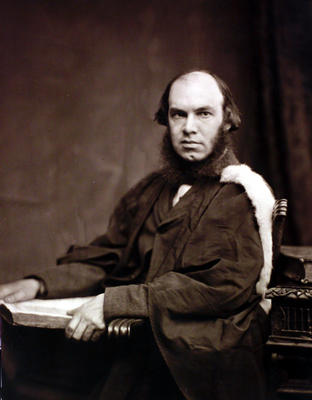
Edward Caird

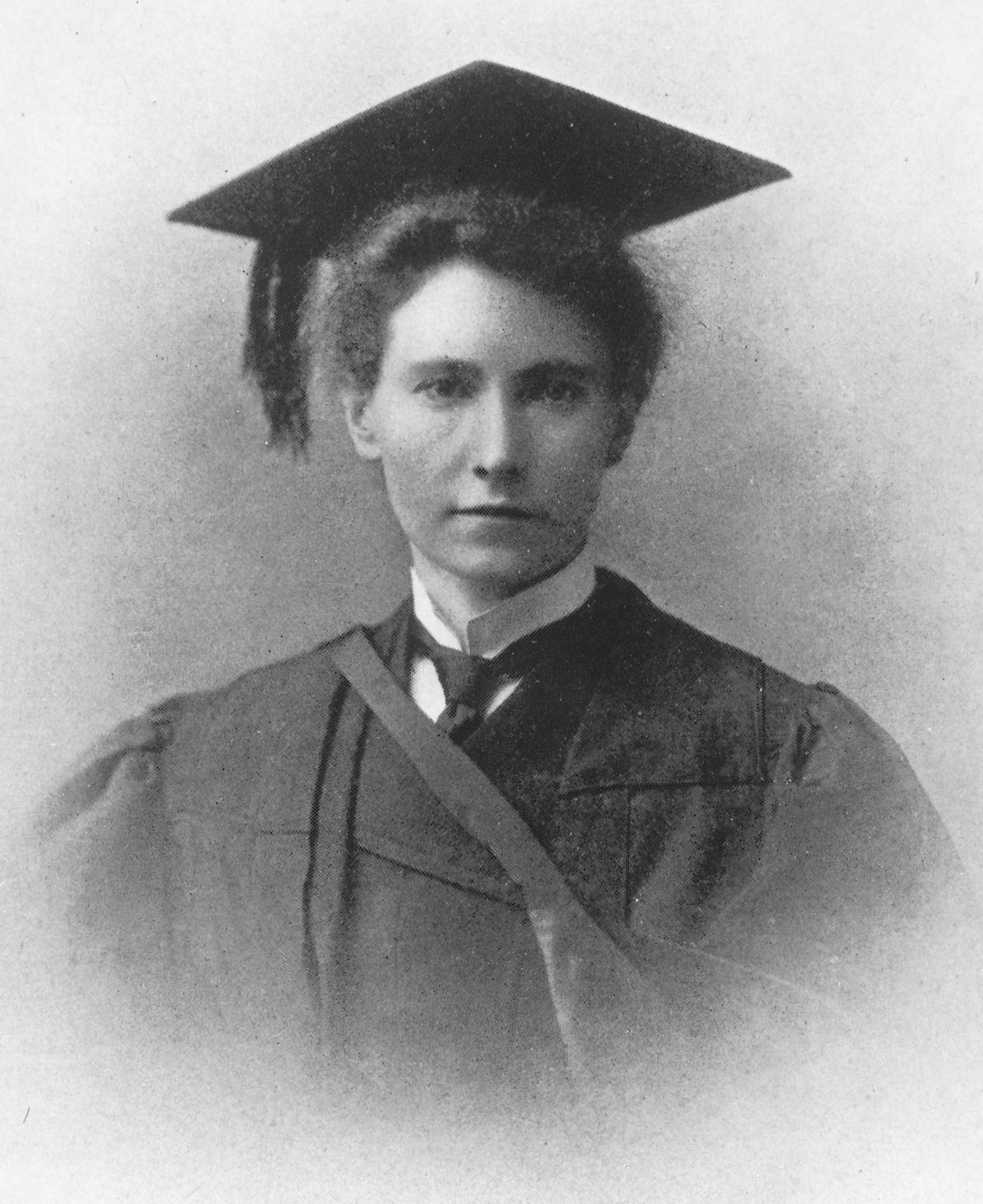
Marion Gilchrist (doctor) 1894

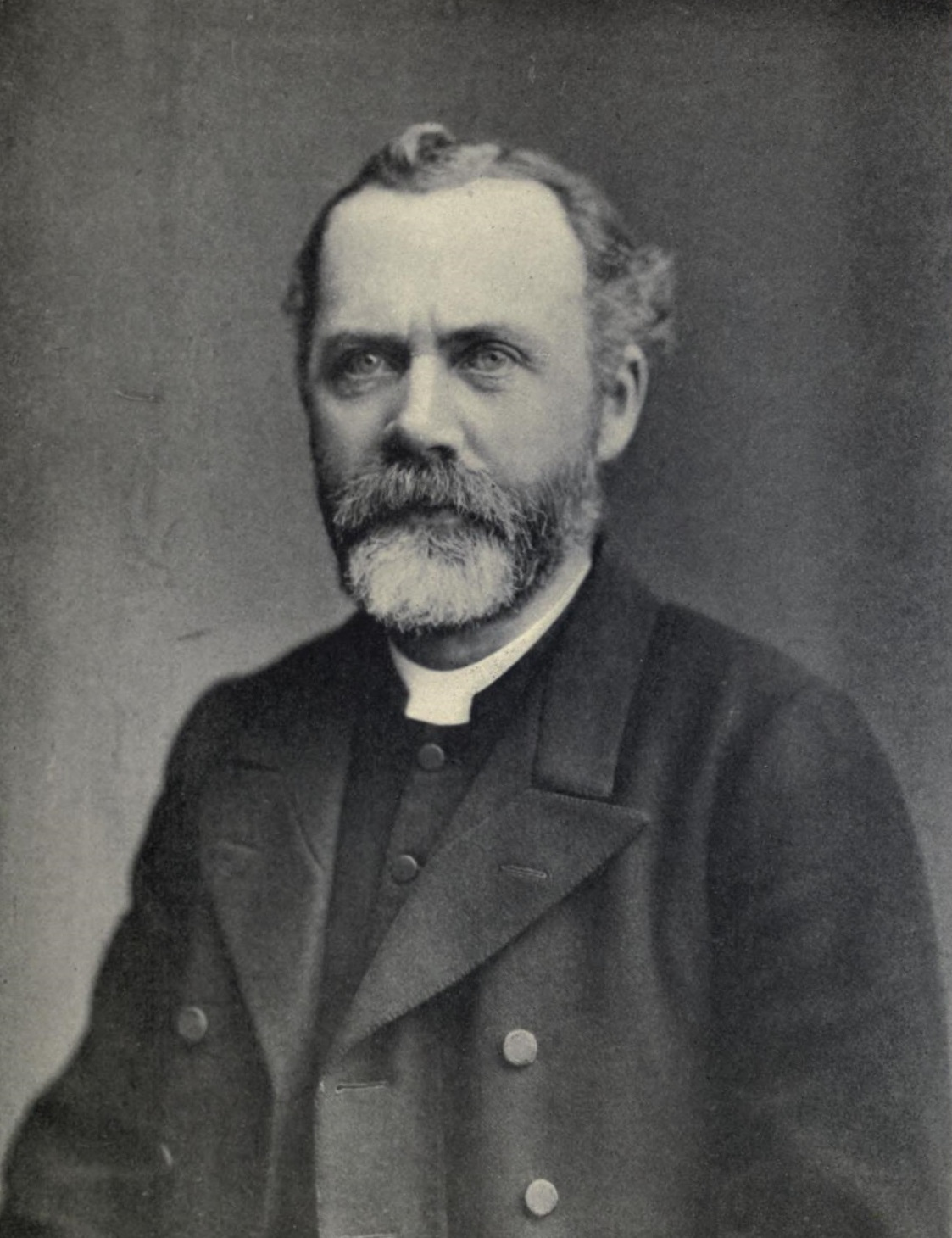
Portrait of Thomas Martin Lindsay

The Glasgow and West of Scotland Association for Women’s Suffrage was an organisation involved in campaigning for women’s suffrage, based in Glasgow, with members from all over the west of Scotland.

== Formation ==
The association met for the first time in 1902, in the home of founding president Mrs Greig, at 18 Lynedoch Crescent, Glasgow, and affiliated to the National Union of Women's Suffrage Societies the following year. Further meetings (until 1909) were held in the offices of the Scottish Council for Women's Trades at 58 Renfield Street. Greig was, for many years president of the Glasgow Women's Liberal Association, and, along with fellow members Alice McLaren, Elizabeth Margaret Pace, Grace Paterson & Margaret Irwin was also a member of the GCWT.

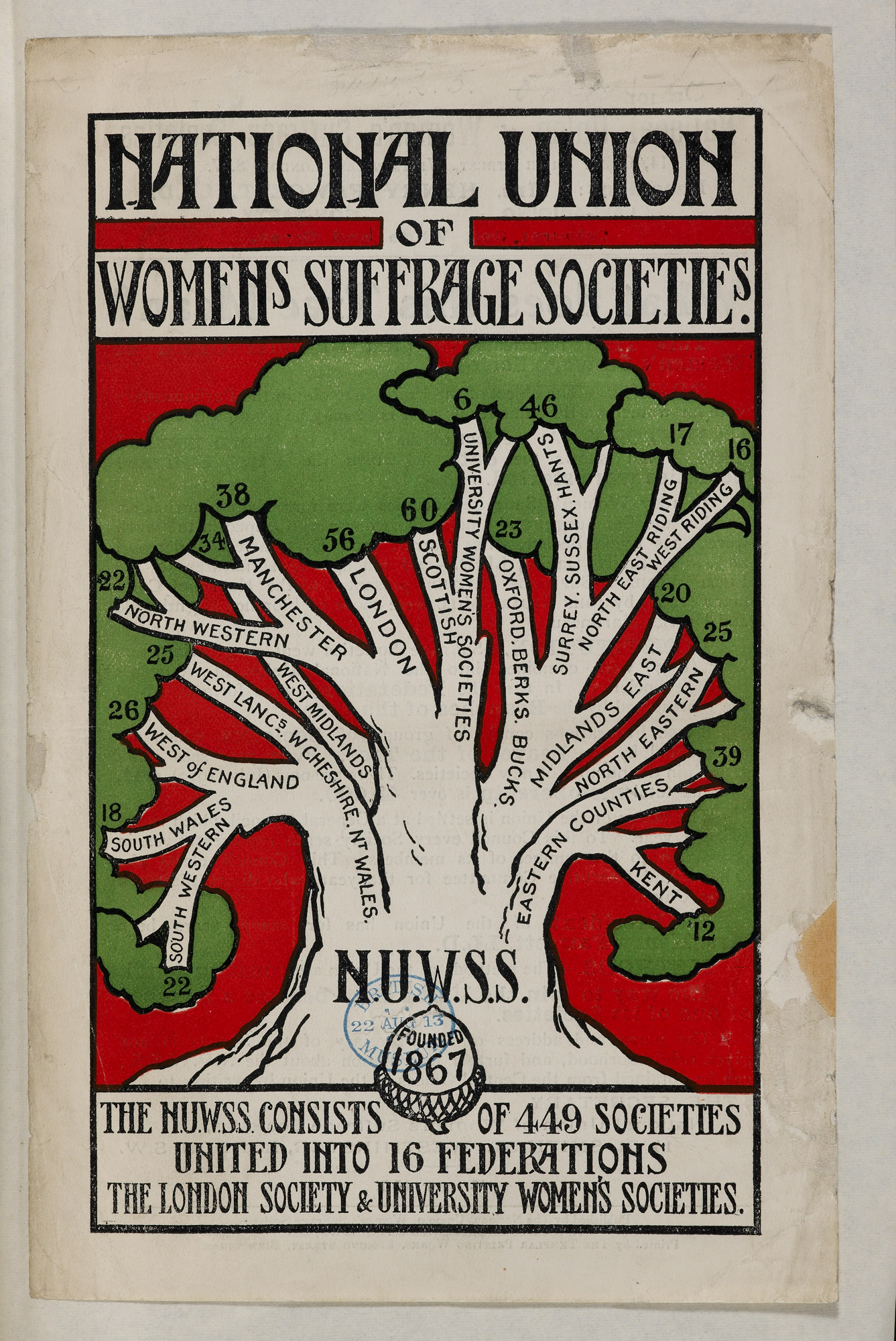
Manifesto NUWSS

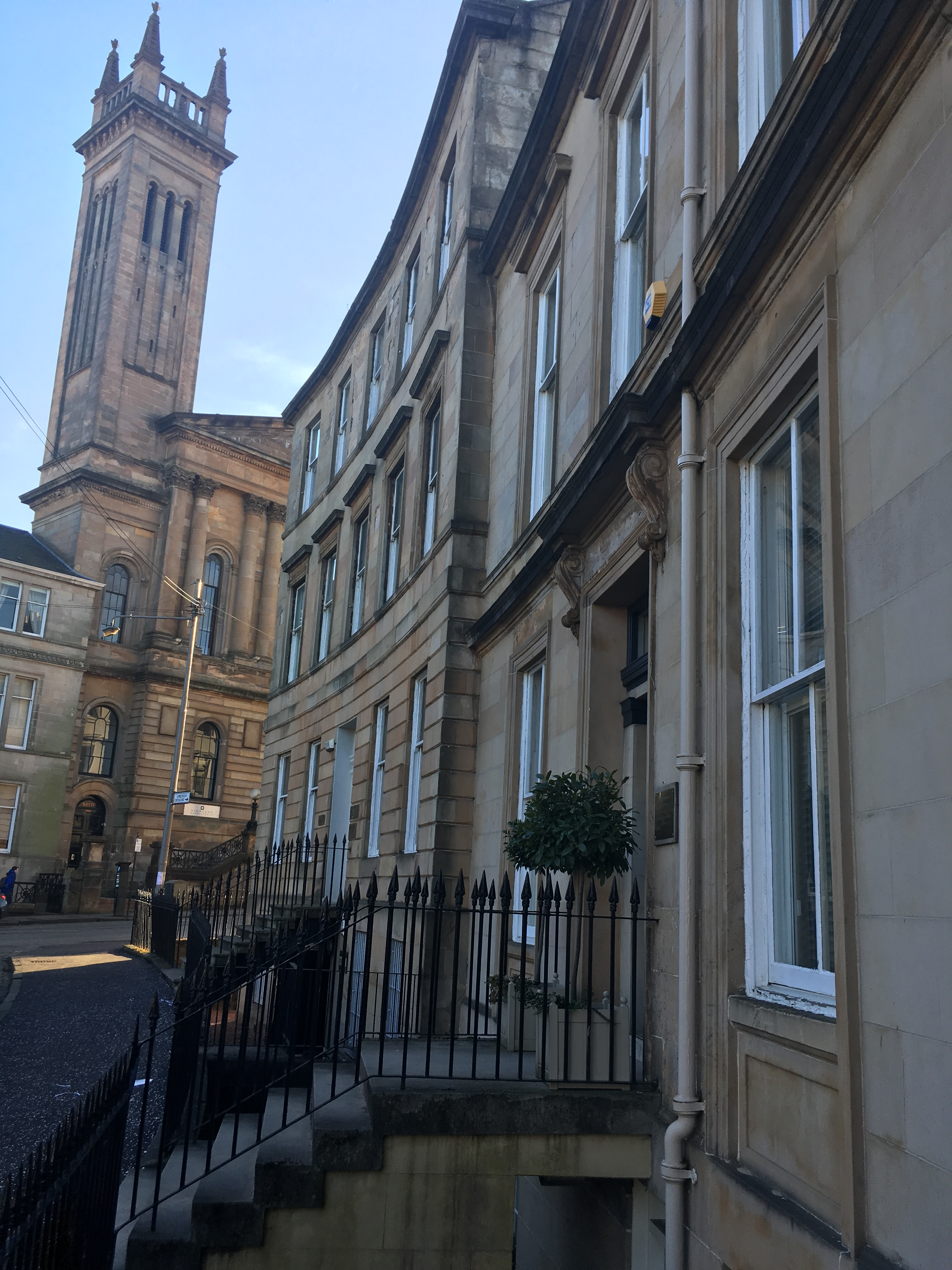
18 Lynedoch Crescent, Glasgow

== Activities ==
The organisation is considered to be a non-militant suffrage association, and although it welcomed male members, it was organised and led by women. Their methods of influence included drawing-room meetings, addressed by prominent male and female suffragists, as well as networking with other organisations, such as The Primrose League, West of Scotland Women's Liberal Unionist Association, Scottish Women's Liberal Federation, Glasgow Council for Women's Trades & British Women's Temperance Association.

The close links between the Glasgow Council for Women's Trades have been noted by Elspeth King: "There is no doubt that the Suffrage Society of 1902 was essentially the child of the Scottish Council for Women's Trades. The frenetic attempts of the executive committee to persuade the Countess of Aberdeen, Ishbel Hamilton-Gordon, Marchioness of Aberdeen and Temair to accept the presidency was due to the fact that she had been President of the parent body since its inception, and President of the International Council of Women since 1893." The countess was unable to accept the presidency, presumably owing to her workload.

Elspeth King notes that the social status of the members was a key driver of their activities. " [It] helped to attract the support of a succession of Liberal Lord Provosts and Town Councillors, and Members of Parliament."

From the earliest days, members of the organisation travelled throughout the West of Scotland, addressing meetings and facilitating the setting up of branches of the organisation, in places such as Greenock, Motherwell and Kilmacolm, the latter in cooperation with the Kilmacolm Women's Liberal Association. They also took their campaign with them as they travelled doon the watter to the Clyde coastal resorts, such as Helensburgh, Troon, Saltcoats, Dunoon and Rothesay. A branch of the association was established in Greenock, in 1904.

In November 1907, a deputation met with the Prime Minister, Lloyd George at the North British Station Hotel. "He was asked by Mrs Hunter for a pledge that the Government would bring in a women's suffrage Bill before this Parliament came to the end of its career."

During the war, the organisation suspended political campaigning, running a series of lectures instead. In the advertisements, they identified themselves as "non-party, non-militant" and "law-abiding", in order to distinguish themselves from the more militant groups, such as the Women's Social and Political Union.

== Evolution ==
After the Representation of the People Act 1918 was passed, the Association quickly moved on to promoting women candidates in local government elections. The Women's Local Representation Joint Committee was formed of a number of different organisations with similar aims. These were the Voters' Council, the Women's Educational Union, the Glasgow Women's Citizens' Association, a body formed by members of the Women's Freedom League, the National Council of Women, and the Glasgow Society for Women's Suffrage. It was chaired by Mary Anderson Snodgrass who would go on to be a Town Councillor and Bailie of the city of Glasgow. This coalition of organisations had the role of a pressure group, promoting legislation favourable to women.

In 1933, the societies were dissolved for financial reason; however, the women continued to meet in Queen Margaret Union at University of Glasgow until the 1960s.

== Notable members ==
Members included:

- Janie Allan
- Mrs Ballantyne
- Andrew Ballantyne
- Miss Baker
- Margaret J Barlas
- Mrs Beith
- Miss M Blackie
- Miss Burnett
- Professor Edward Caird and Mrs Caird
- Miss Mary Campbell
- Miss Campbell
- Professor Cooper
- Martha Frame
- Mrs Greenlees
- Marion Gilchrist (Doctor)
- Mrs Greig (Founding chair of executive committee and Former president of the Glasgow Women's Liberal Association)
- Nellie Hunter
- Margaret Irwin (trade unionist)
- Dr Thomas Martin Lindsay and Anna Lindsay
- Dr Alice McLaren
- Dr Elizabeth Margaret Pace
- Grace Paterson
- Mrs Paxton
- Professor GA Smith
- Mary Anderson Snodgrass
- Mrs C Young (Treasurer)

== See also ==
- Feminism in the United Kingdom
- List of suffragists and suffragettes
- List of women's rights activists
- List of women's rights organizations
- Timeline of women's suffrage
- Women's suffrage organizations
