= Mary Bell (politician) =

Scottish politician (1862–1943)

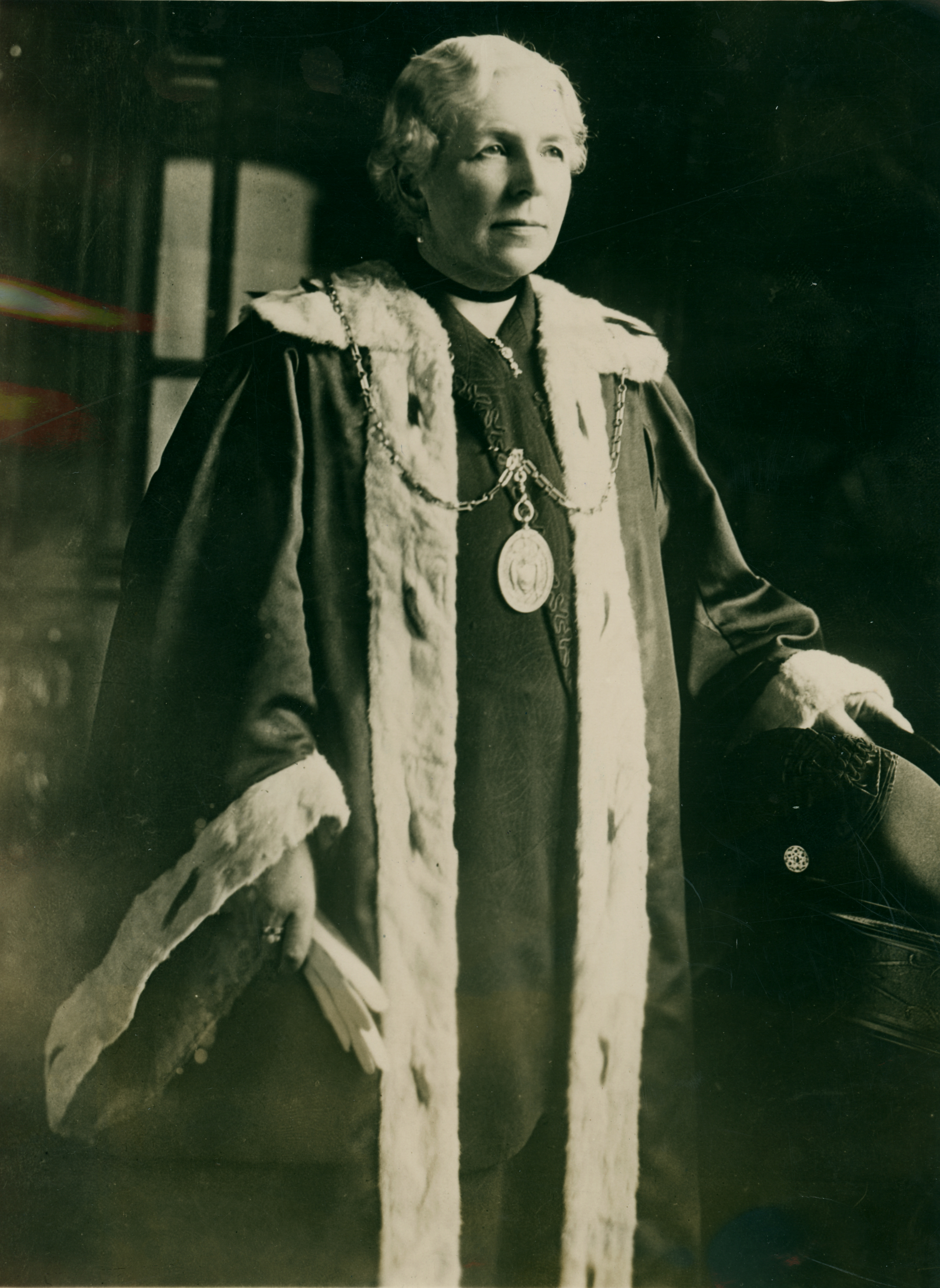
- Mary Bell c. 1927 by Underwood & Underwood
- Born: 1862; Glasgow, Scotland
- Died: 1943 (aged 79–80); Glasgow, Scotland
- Occupation: Politician
- Known for: Local politics, women's rights

Mary Bell (1862–1943) was a Scottish politician, one of the first Scottish women to be elected as a local councillor, and the first female senior magistrate of the city of Glasgow.

== Political career ==
Bell was one of a pioneering group of five women who were elected in 1920 which included Jessica Baird-Smith & Mary Anderson Snodgrass elected as Moderate councillors, and Eleanor Stewart (trade unionist) and Mary Barbour as Labour candidates. She was councillor for the Langside area of the city, and the first women magistrate to represent the Glasgow Corporation at a sitting of the High Court in Glasgow.

In 1924, she was promoted to the position of depute river baillie of Glasgow, at the same time as Mary Barbour was elected as baillie. It was reported that "their appointment was greeted with cheers".

In 1925, she witnessed the execution of a man named John Keen, who had been found guilty of the murder of Noorh Mohammed. Interviewed by The Scotsman after the event she explained, "Many people urged me not to attend the execution, but I wanted to prove that a woman is fit to take her place on the public bodies. We women in the civic body of a city like Glasgow are pioneers of the women's movement, and we need to show that we are fit to take the unpleasant with the pleasant"

Bell was a suffragist, and a member of the Women's Freedom League. She was instrumental in establishing the Cathcart branch of the National Union of Societies for Equal Citizenship. She was also vice-president of the Shawlands Women's Unionist Association, and member of the Tradeston Women's Unionist Association. She was on the committee of the Dykebar Asylum, and one of the directors of the Lenzie Convalescent Home.

In the 1929 New Year Honours list, Bell was made Commander of the Order of the British Empire (CBE) as Bailie of the City of Glasgow.

In 1938, Bell's son Arthur was elected as a councillor in a by-election in the Camphill Ward of Glasgow
