= Anna Lindsay (activist) =

Scot (1845–1903), women's activist

- Born: Anna Dunlop; 24 June 1845; Edinburgh
- Died: 1 March 1903 (aged 57); Kelvinside, Glasgow
- Known for: Scottish women's rights activist
- Spouse: Thomas Martin Lindsay
- Children: 2 daughters and 3 sons including Alexander Lindsay, 1st Baron Lindsay of Birker
- Parent(s): Eliza Esther and Alexander Colquhoun-Stirling-Murray-Dunlop

Anna Lindsay (née Dunlop; 24 June 1845 – 1 March 1903) was a Scottish women's activist. She was one of the founders of the Glasgow Association for the Higher Education of Women and her name was said to be synonymous with the women's movement in Scotland. She was the first chairperson of the Scottish Women's Liberal Federation.

== Biography ==
Lindsay was born in Edinburgh in 1845, the eldest daughter of Eliza Esther (née Murray) and Alexander Colquhoun-Stirling-Murray-Dunlop, an MP and lawyer. She was educated at home, and went on to be one of the first students at the University Classes for Women in Edinburgh where she impressed her professors.

The Glasgow Association for the Higher Education of Women was started after a suggestion of Mrs Jean Campbell by Professor John Nichol in 1868 to start lectures for women. Lindsay was one of its founders.

In 1889, she used her membership of the Liberal Party to form a local women's association that was known as the Glasgow and West of Scotland Women's Liberal Association. She was the vice-chair of the Association, and when, in 1891, it merged with other organisations to create the Scottish Women's Liberal Federation (SWLF) she became its chair. It was only her health that prevented her from continuing in that role after 1899.

From 1901 to 1903, she was a member of the Scottish Christian Union, independent but affiliated to the British Women's Temperance Association. She also joined the Glasgow and West of Scotland Association for Women's Suffrage.

== Personal life ==
On the 8 October 1872, Lindsay married the academic Thomas Martin Lindsay and moved to live with him in Glasgow. Together they had five children, two daughters and three sons. Their daughter Susan married the medieval historian F. M. Powicke and their eldest son was Alexander Lindsay, 1st Baron Lindsay of Birker, who became a professor of Moral Philosophy at the University of Glasgow, Master of Balliol College, and Vice-Chancellor of the University of Oxford.

In 1903, Lindsay died in Kelvinside in Glasgow.
