= Elizabeth Margaret Pace =

Scottish physician and suffragist (1866–1957)

Elizabeth Pace
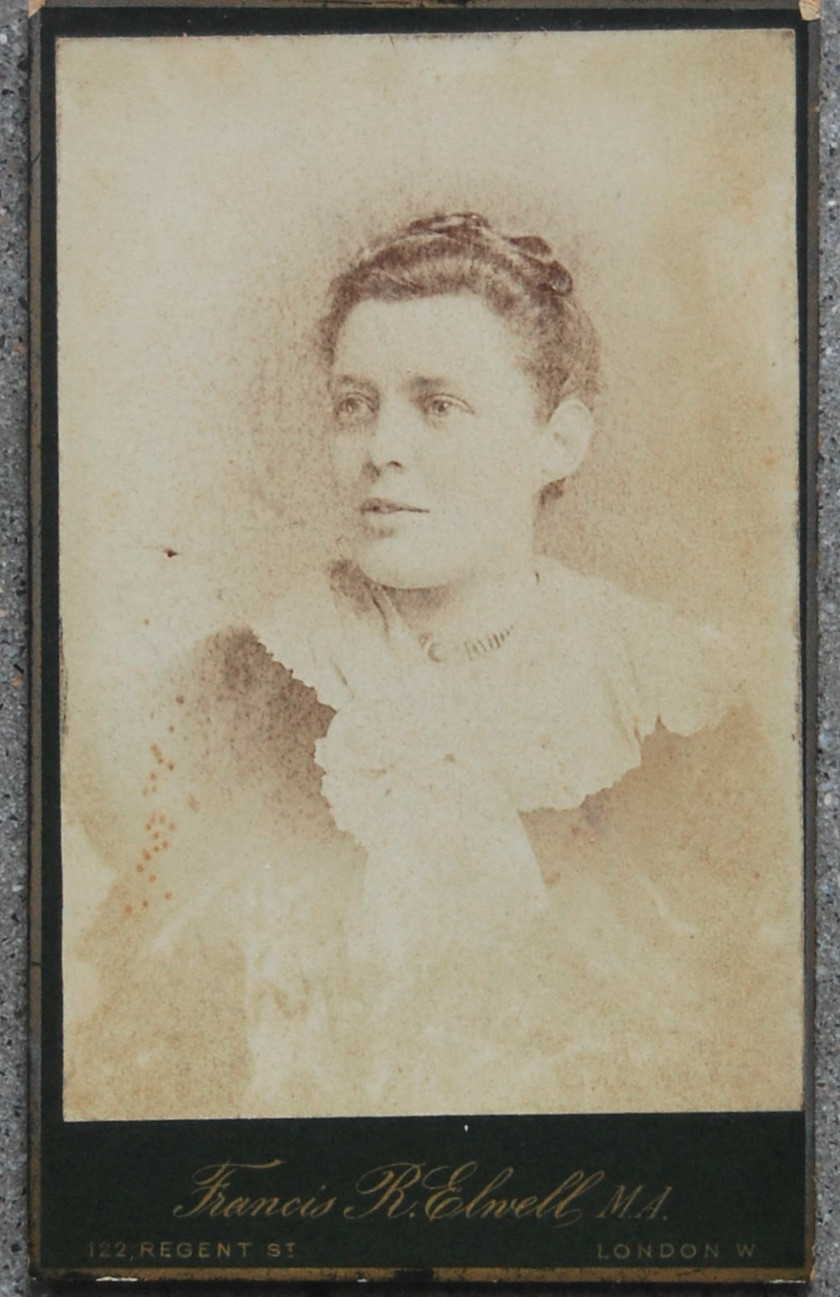
- Born: 1866; Lambeth, London, England
- Died: 1957 (aged 90–91); St Andrews, Scotland
- Education: London School of Medicine for Women
- Occupation: Doctor
- Medical career
- Field: Obstetrics

Elizabeth Pace (1866–1957) was a Scottish medical doctor, suffragist and advocate for women's health and women's rights.

== Early life and education ==
Elizabeth Margaret Pace was born in Brixton in 1866 to Margaret Gibb and Thomas Richard Pace, a leather manufacturer, the eldest of four children. She attended Clapham High School. In 1884, she matriculated in the London School of Medicine for Women. She graduated in 1891. In 1892, she was presented to the chancellor at Burlington House, where she was noted for having an award in obstetrics.

== Career ==
During her career, she worked in a number of institutions, in London, Glasgow and Scotland, including:

- New Hospital for Women
- Gynecology department, Bellahoustoun Dispensary
- Glasgow Lock Hospital
- Victoria Infirmary Dispensary
- Glasgow Women's Private Hospital
- St Margaret's School, Polmont

She was involved in a number of organisations with charitable aims, with a particular focus on women's work and health, many alongside her housemate, and colleague, Dr Alice McLaren. In 1893, she was elected honorary member and medical officer of the Ancient Order of Foresters, a friendly society. She was also associated with the Scottish Women's Benefit Association, and the Glasgow and West of Scotland Co-operation for Trained Nurses. She was a member of the Glasgow Obstetric and Gynecological Society. In 1902, she was involved in founding the Glasgow Women's Private Hospital alongside Alice McLaren. She retired from the hospital in 1908, but "she retained her interest in the hospital and remained on the executive committee."

She lectured on various subjects related to health, in institutions such as John Street public school, with Dr Alice McLaren; Kilmarnock school board, and the Logan and Johnston school of domestic economy in Bridgeton. She had a particular interest in temperance, speaking at a conference on the subject, alongside Sophia Jex-Blake. She also spoke on the importance of exercise for women.

She was a founder member of the Glasgow and West of Scotland Association for Women's Suffrage.

== Personal life ==
During her time in Glasgow, she shared a house with Dr Alice McLaren at 7 Newton Place. She married Andrew Maitland Ramsay in 1906. She died in St Andrews in 1957.

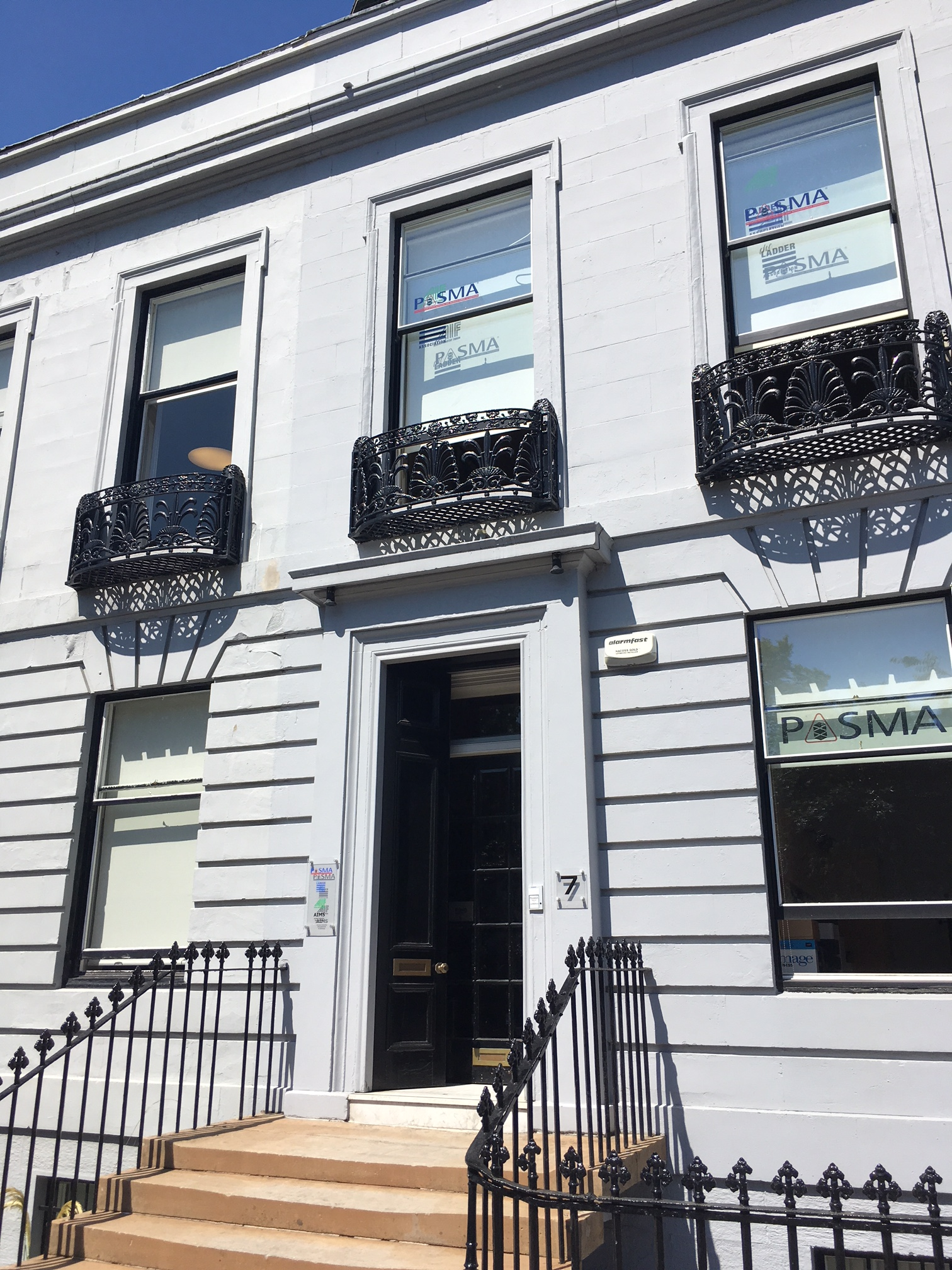
7 Newton Place, Glasgow
