= Alice McLaren =

Scottish doctor, gynecologist, suffragist (1860–1945)

Alice Janet McLaren
- Born: 1860; Edinburgh, Scotland
- Died: 1945 (aged 78–79); Crail
- Education: London School of Medicine for Women
- Occupation: Doctor
- Years active: 1890 -
- Known for: Medicine
- Medical career
- Field: Obstetrics

Dr Alice McLaren (1860 - 1945) was a Scottish medical doctor, gynecologist, suffragist and advocate for women's health and women's rights. She was the first woman medical practitioner in Glasgow.

== Early life and education ==
McLaren was born in Edinburgh to William Cunningham McLaren and Maria Amelia Wilson, and was the last of six siblings. She graduated with first class honours in Medicine from University of London in 1893. McLaren trained at Glasgow Royal Infirmary.

== Medical career ==
The British Medical Journal's obituary of McLaren noted that she was the first woman gynecologist in Glasgow. During her career, she worked in a number of institutions, including:

- Glasgow Women's Private Hospital, where she was medical superintendent
- Glasgow Lock Hospital
- Glasgow Royal Samaritan Hospital
- Royal Mental Hospital, where she was consulting Gynecolog

McLaren was a fellow of the Glasgow Obstetrical and Gynecological Society. In 1902, she was involved in founding the Glasgow Women's Private Hospital alongside Elizabeth Margaret Pace.

== Later life ==
During her time in Glasgow, she shared a house with Elizabeth Margaret Pace at 7 Newton Place until the latter's marriage in 1906. McLaren died in Crail in 1945.

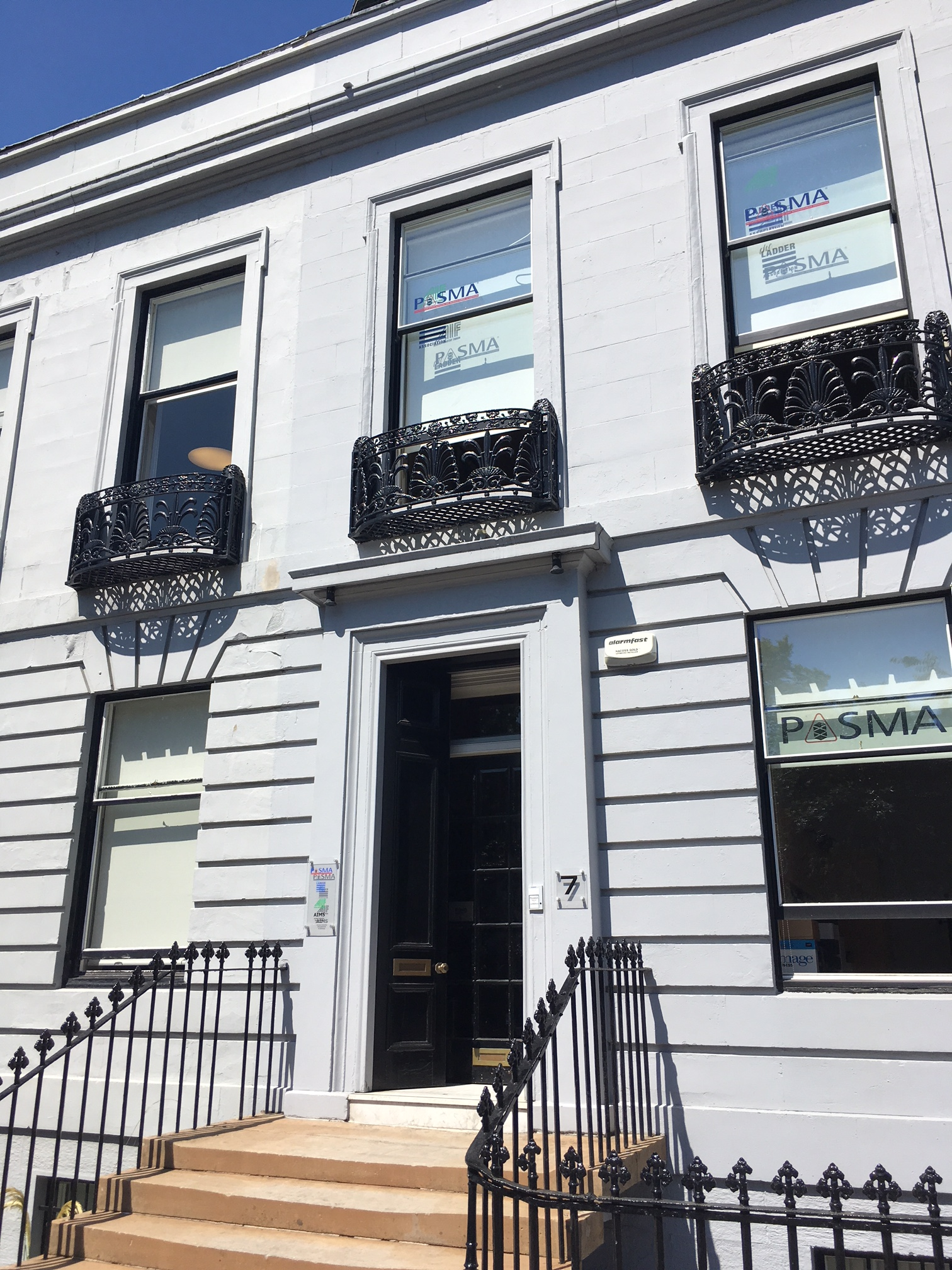
7 Newton Place, Glasgow

== Women's rights ==
McLaren was a founder member of the Glasgow and West of Scotland Association for Women's Suffrage.
