= Mary Anderson Snodgrass =

Scottish politician and suffragist (1862–1945)

- Born: 1862; Glasgow, Scotland
- Died: 1945 (aged 82–83); Glasgow, Scotland
- Education: Queen Margaret College, Glasgow
- Occupation: Politician
- Known for: Local Politics
- Parents: John Snodgrass (father); Elizabeth Salmon (mother)

Mary Anderson Snodgrass (1862–1945) was a politician, suffragist and advocate for women's rights.

== Early life and education ==
Mary Anderson Snodgrass was born in Milton in 1862, the daughter of a flour miller and grain merchant. She lived for much of her life at Crown Gardens in Partick. She attended Queen Margaret College (Glasgow), and was instrumental in setting up the Queen Margaret Settlement, an institution, attached to the college, which was founded to promote the welfare of poorer people, particularly women and children. She remained part of that organisation until 1934, having served as honorary treasurer since 1900.

== Suffrage and women's rights ==
She was a member of the Glasgow and West of Scotland Association for Women's Suffrage, and chair of its successor organisation the Glasgow Society of Equal Citizenship. The latter organised and supported women candidates in public life, such as local councils and parliament.

== Political career ==
In 1920, she was one of five women voted onto Glasgow Town Council, representing Anderston Ward from 1920 to 1922, the others being Mary Barbour, Eleanor Stewart, Jessica Baird-Smith, and Mary Bell. She was defeated at the polls in 1922, and she stood again for election in 1923, for Kelvinside Ward, where she served until 1933. She was bailie of the city of Glasgow from 1926 to 1929. In 1933, she was referred to as the "mother of the flock" of female town councillors in Glasgow.

She died in December 1945.
