= Margaret Irwin (trade unionist) =

Scottish women's labour activist (1858–1940)

Margaret Irwin CBE FRSA
- Born: Margaret Hardinge Irwin; 13 January 1858; Off the coast of Peru
- Died: 23 January 1940 (aged 82); Glasgow, Scotland
- Education: High School of Dundee, Glasgow School of Art, Queen Margaret College
- Alma mater: University of St Andrews
- Organization(s): Women's Protective and Provident League, Scottish Council for Women's Trades, Scottish Trades Union Congress, Glasgow and West of Scotland Association for Women's Suffrage, Women's Social and Political Union
- Honours: Commander of the Order of the British Empire

Margaret Hardinge Irwin CBE FRSA (13 January 1858 – 1940) was a Scottish suffragist and labour activist who held important posts in the trade union movement.

== Early life ==
Irwin was born on 13 January 1858. She was born at sea off the coast of Peru on board the ship Lord Hardinge, from which she took her middle name. Her father James Ritchie Irwin was the captain of the Lord Handinge and her mother was Margaret Hunter Irwin (née Cappon).

She grew up in Broughty Ferry in Forfarshire, and was educated privately and at the High School of Dundee. She then studied at the University of St Andrews, from which she received a "Lady Literate in Arts" (LLA) degree, followed by attendance at the Glasgow School of Art and Queen Margaret College. She then became involved in the women's rights movement, and also bought and ran a fruit farm in Blairgowrie.

== Activism ==
=== Trade unionism ===
In 1891, Irwin became the full-time Scottish organising secretary of the Women's Protective and Provident League(WPPL ). She campaigned for the creation of the Scottish Trades Union Congress (STUC) and, when it was created in 1897, she was elected as its first secretary. She served as secretary for its first three years (1897-1900). When the STUC decided to exclude trade councils from affiliating with the union, Irwin decided not to stand for re-election and became the secretary of the Scottish Council for Women's Trades (SCWT). She frequently served as the SCWT delegate to the STUC over the next decade.

=== Women working at home ===
One of Irwin's main interests was the conditions for women who worked at home. It had been found that the economic condition of these workers was about as desperate as it could well be. There were occasional instances of ability to earn a decent living, but on the whole wages were extremely small, and the hours of labour extremely long.

In 1892, Irwin was appointed to the Royal Commission of Labour as a Lady Assistant Commissioner. She wrote detailed reports about the conditions experienced by women working in laundries, tailoring and sweated trades. In one report, for example, she described a mother-of-seven who was the main bread-winner for her family, working as a trouser-finisher. The entire household of 11 people, including two male lodgers, lived in just two rooms. Irwin also exchanged correspondence on sweated workshops with the National Union of Women Workers (NUWW).

The Glasgow Council for Women's Trades (later the Scottish Council for Women's Trades) under her chairmanship, also delivered lectures on the ethics of shopping. The meeting, chaired by Watson Reid heard that "there was no such things as a bargain, because if a thing was produced at less than the current rate somebody had to pay for it. The remedy for this sweating and ill-payment was exclusive preferential dealing with shops where fair conditions prevailed and the religious boycotting of any shop where these were not to be found" The Council also worked with Conservative Party politician John McAusland Denny to introduce a bill for the "compulsory provision of seats behind the counter for lady assistants in shops" that became the Seats for Shop Assistants Act 1899.

=== Women's suffrage ===
Irwin's first motion to the STUC in 1897 was on the topic of women's suffrage. The motion was carried by 57 to 18. In 1902, Irwin was a re-founding member, alongside Marion Gilchrist and Janie Allen, and the secretary of the Glasgow and West of Scotland Association for Women's Suffrage (GWSAWS). Many of the women involved in the reestablishment of the organisation were also part of the Glasgow Council for Women's Trades.

Irwin was nominated by the GWSAWS to attend the National Convention for the Civil Rights of Women, held in London on 16 and 17 October 1903. Irwin resigned from the association in 1907, to join the more militant Women's Social and Political Union (WSPU). She also addressed the new Hillhead branch of the Women's Freedom League in 1908.

== Later life ==
By the 1920s, Irwin was focusing much of her time on her Blairgowrie fruit farm, developing model housing for workers there. She also wrote articles about women's work for the Glasgow Herald.

Irwin was elected as a fellow of the Royal Society of Arts, and was made a Commander of the Order of the British Empire in 1927.

The SCWT dissolved in 1939, and Irwin died the following year on 23 January 1940 in Glasgow.

== Publications ==
- Irwin, Margaret Hardinge (1888). The Employment of Women: Conditions of Work in some of the Textile Centres in the Western District of Scotland. Royal Commission on Labour.
- Irwin, Margaret Hardinge (1892). The Employment of Women: Conditions of Work in the Textile Industries of Glasgow and in the Calico Printing and Turkey Red Dying in the Vale of Leven. Royal Commission on Labour.
- Irwin, Margaret Hardinge (1893) The conditions of women's work in laundries: report of an inquiry conducted for the Council of the Women's Protective and Provident League of Glasgow.
- Irwin, Margaret Hardinge (1896) Women's industries in Scotland: read before the Philosophical Society of Glasgow, 18 March 1896. From the Proceedings of the Royal Philosophical Society of Glasgow
- Irwin, Margaret Hardinge (1900) Home work amongst women: report of an inquiry conducted for the Glasgow Council for Women's Trades.
- Irwin, Margaret Hardinge & Smith, George Adam (1902) The problem of home work.
- Irwin, Margaret Hardinge (1918). Industrial housing from the housewife's point of view. Scottish Council for Women's Trades.
- Irwin, Margaret Hardinge (1910). The Housing of Potato Diggers. Scottish Council for Women's Trades & Union for the Abolition of Sweating.

Trade union offices
New office	Secretary of the Scottish Trades Union Congress; 1897–1900	Succeeded by George Carson
