= Shops Act 1911 =

Act of the Parliament of the United Kingdom

Shops Act 1911 (Note: Section 17(1).)
- Act of Parliament
- Parliament of the United Kingdom
- Long title: An Act to amend and extend the Shops Regulation Acts, 1892 to 1904
- Citation: 1 & 2 Geo. 5. c. 54
- Territorial extent: United Kingdom

Dates
- Royal assent: 16 December 1911
- Commencement: 1 May 1912 (Note: Section 17(2).)
- Repealed: 1 May 1912
Other legislation
Amends	Shop Hours Act 1892; Shop Hours Act 1904
Repeals/revokes	Shop Hours Act 1893
Repealed by	Shops Act 1912

Status: Repealed

Text of statute as originally enacted

The Shops Act 1911 (1 & 2 Geo. 5. c. 54) was an act of the Parliament of the United Kingdom that allowed a weekly half holiday for shop staff. This became known in Britain as "early closing day". It formed part of the Liberal welfare reforms of 1906–1914.

== Background ==
Four brief acts, the Shop Hours Act 1892 (55 & 56 Vict. c. 62), the Shop Hours Act 1893 (56 & 57 Vict. c. 67), the Shop Hours Act 1895 (58 & 59 Vict. c. 5) and the Seats for Shop Assistants Act 1899 (62 & 63 Vict. c. 21), were the first very limited steps taken towards the positive regulation of the employment of shop assistants in the United Kingdom. They, together with the Shops Act 1911, were collectively called the Shops Regulations Acts 1892 to 1911.

The House had resolved that more drastic legislation was required. As regards shops, therefore, in place of such general codes as apply to factories, laundries, mines—only three kinds of protective requirement are binding on employers of shop assistants:

1. Limitation of the weekly total of hours of work of persons under eighteen years of age to seventy-four inclusive of meal-times;
2. prohibition of the employment of such persons in a shop on the same day that they have, to the knowledge of the employer, been employed in any factory or workshop for a longer period than would, in both classes of employment together, amount to the number of hours permitted to such persons in a factory or workshop;
3. provision for the supply of seats by the employer, in all rooms of a shop or other premises where goods are retailed to the public, for the use of female assistants employed in retailing the goods—the seats to be in the proportion of not fewer than one to every three female assistants.

Shop Hours Act 1892 (Note: Section 1.)
- Act of Parliament
- Parliament of the United Kingdom
- Long title: An Act to amend the Law relating to the Employment of Young Persons in Shops.
- Citation: 55 & 56 Vict. c. 62
- Territorial extent: United Kingdom

Dates
- Royal assent: 28 June 1892
- Commencement: 1 September 1892 (Note: Section 2.)
- Repealed: 1 May 1912
Other legislation
Amended by	Shop Hours Act 1893; Shop Hours Act 1895; Shops Act 1911
Repealed by	Shop Act 1912
Relates to	Factory and Workshop Act 1878

Status: Repealed

Text of statute as originally enacted

The first two requirements are contained in the Shop Hours Act 1892 (55 & 56 Vict. c. 62), which also prescribed that a notice, referring to the provisions of the act, and stating the number of hours in the week during which a young person may be lawfully employed in the shop, shall be kept exhibited by the employer; the third requirement was first provided by the Seats for Shop Assistants Act 1899.

A wide interpretation is given by the Shop Hours Act 1892 to the class of workplace to which the limitation of hours applies. "Shop" means retail and wholesale shops, markets, stalls and warehouses in which assistants are employed for hire, and includes licensed public-houses and refreshment houses of any kind. The person responsible for the observance of the acts is the "employer" of the "young persons" (i.e., persons under the age of eighteen years), whose hours are limited, and of the "female assistants" for whom seats must be provided. The provisions of the Shop Hours Act 1892 did not apply to members of the same family living in a house of which the shop forms part, or to members of the employer's family, or to anyone wholly employed as a domestic servant.

Shop Hours Act 1893
- Act of Parliament
- Parliament of the United Kingdom
- Long title: An Act to amend the Shop Hours Act, 1892.
- Citation: 56 & 57 Vict. c. 67
- Territorial extent: United Kingdom

Dates
- Royal assent: 21 December 1893
- Commencement: 21 December 1893 (Note: The Acts of Parliament (Commencement) Act 1793.)
- Repealed: 1 May 1912
Other legislation
Amends	Shop Hours Act 1892
Repealed by	Shops Act 1911

Status: Repealed

Text of statute as originally enacted

The Shop Hours Act 1893 (56 & 57 Vict. c. 67) provided for the salaries and expenses of the inspectors appointed by councils under by the Shop Hours Act 1892 (55 & 56 Vict. c. 62).

Shop Hours Act 1895
- Act of Parliament
- Parliament of the United Kingdom
- Long title: An Act to amend the Shop Hours Act, 1892.
- Citation: 58 & 59 Vict. c. 5
- Territorial extent: United Kingdom

Dates
- Royal assent: 9 April 1895
- Commencement: 9 April 1895
- Repealed: 1 May 1912
Other legislation
Amends	Shop Hours Act 1892
Repealed by	Shops Act 1912

Status: Repealed

Text of statute as originally enacted

The Shop Hours Act 1895 (58 & 59 Vict. c. 5) provided a penalty for failure of a shop to keep exhibited the notice of the provisions of the earlier acts, which in the absence of a penalty it had been impossible to enforce.

Neither the term "employer " nor "shop assistant" (used in the title of the Seats for Shop Assistants Act 1899) was defined; but other terms had the meaning assigned to them in the Factory and Workshop Act 1878. The "employer" had, in case of any contravention alleged, the same power as the "occupier" in the Factory Acts to exempt himself from fines on proof of due diligence and of the fact that some other person is the actual offender.

In London, where the county council appointed men and women inspectors to apply the acts of 1892 to 1899, there were, in 1900, 73,929 premises, and in 1905, 84,269, under inspection. In the latter year, there were 22,035 employing persons under eighteen years of age. In 1900, the number of young persons under the acts were: indoors, 10,239 boys and 4,428 girls; outdoors, 35,019 boys, 206 girls. In 1905, the ratio between boys and girls had decidedly altered: indoors, 6,602 boys, 4,668 girls; outdoors, 22,654 boys, 308 girls. The number of irregularities reported in 1900 was 9,204 and the prosecutions were 111; in 1905 the irregularities were 6966 and the prosecutions numbered 34. As regards the Seats for Shop Assistants Act 1899, in only 1,088 of the 14,844 shops affected in London was there found in 1900 to be failure to provide seats for the women employed in retailing goods.

Shop Hours Act 1904 (Note: Section 10.)
- Act of Parliament
- Parliament of the United Kingdom
- Long title: An Act to provide for the Early Closing of Shops.
- Citation: 4 Edw. 7. c. 31
- Territorial extent: United Kingdom

Dates
- Royal assent: 15 August 1904
- Commencement: 15 August 1904
- Repealed: 1 May 1912
Other legislation
Repealed by	Shops Act 1912

Status: Repealed

Text of statute as originally enacted

The Shop Hours Act 1904 (4 Edw. 7. c. 31) gave certain additional optional powers to local authorities, making a "closing order" fixing the hour (not earlier than 7 p.m., or on one day in the week 1 p.m.) at which shops in their area had to stop serving customers. Councils could decide the types of shops to which the order would apply. The consent of two-thirds of the owners of the shops affected was required to make the order, and in practice this proved difficult to obtain.

== Subsequent developments ==
The Shops Regulations Acts 1892 to 1911 were all repealed and replaced by the Shops Act 1912 (2 & 3 Geo. 5. c. 3) on 1 May 1912.

The whole of the 1912 act was repealed by section 76(1) of, and the eighth schedule to, the Shops Act 1950 (14 Geo. 6 c. 28), which came into operation on 1 October 1950.

== See also ==
- Right to sit
