= Birmingham and Midland Skin and Urinary Hospital =

Specialist hospital in Birmingham, England

Coordinates: 52.47675707°N 1.901204°W

Birmingham and Midland Skin and Urinary Hospital which was initially known as the Birmingham and Midland Skin and Lock Hospital, was a specialist hospital in Birmingham.

== History ==
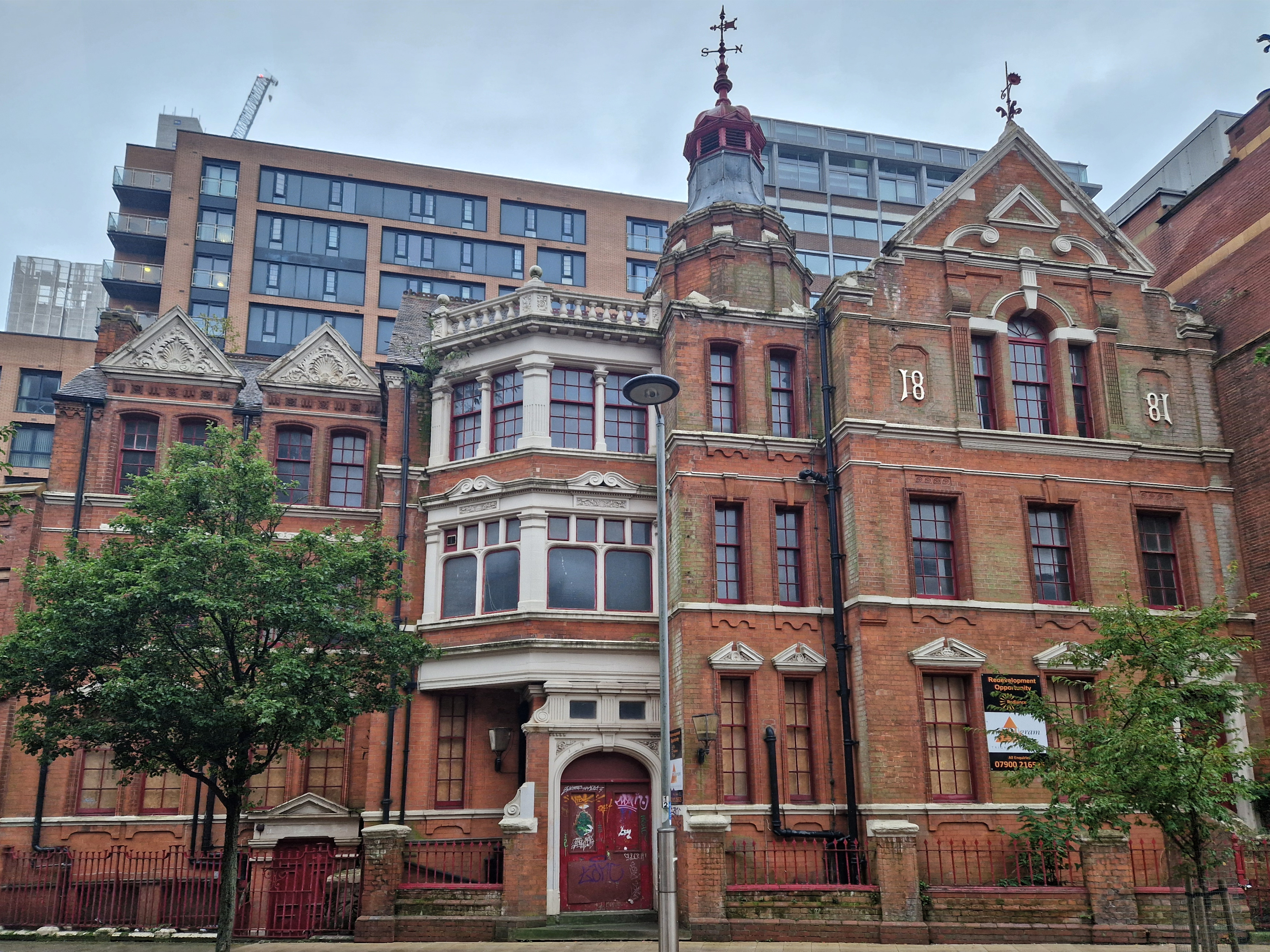
Birmingham and Midland Skin Hospital

The hospital was one of a number of specialist hospitals founded in Birmingham in the late nineteenth century. The Birmingham and Midland Skin and Lock hospital was established in 1880 to treat people with both skin diseases and venereal diseases. By 1887–1888, a purpose built hospital designed by James and Lister Lea was built in John Bright Street to replace the small house in which the hospital had been established. By 1895, this was called the Birmingham and Midland Skin and Urinary Hospital and was also treating people with illnesses of the urinary tract. Today, patients are treated at the new Queen Elizabeth Hospital Birmingham.

== Notable staff ==
- Lilian Lambe Woodward (1869–1952), was matron from 1914. She retired in 1929. Woodward trained at The London Hospital under Eva Luckes between 1901 and 1903. Before her training, Woodward had worked at a private hospital in Edgbaston for 11 years.
