= Andrew Maitland Ramsay =

Scottish ophthalmologist

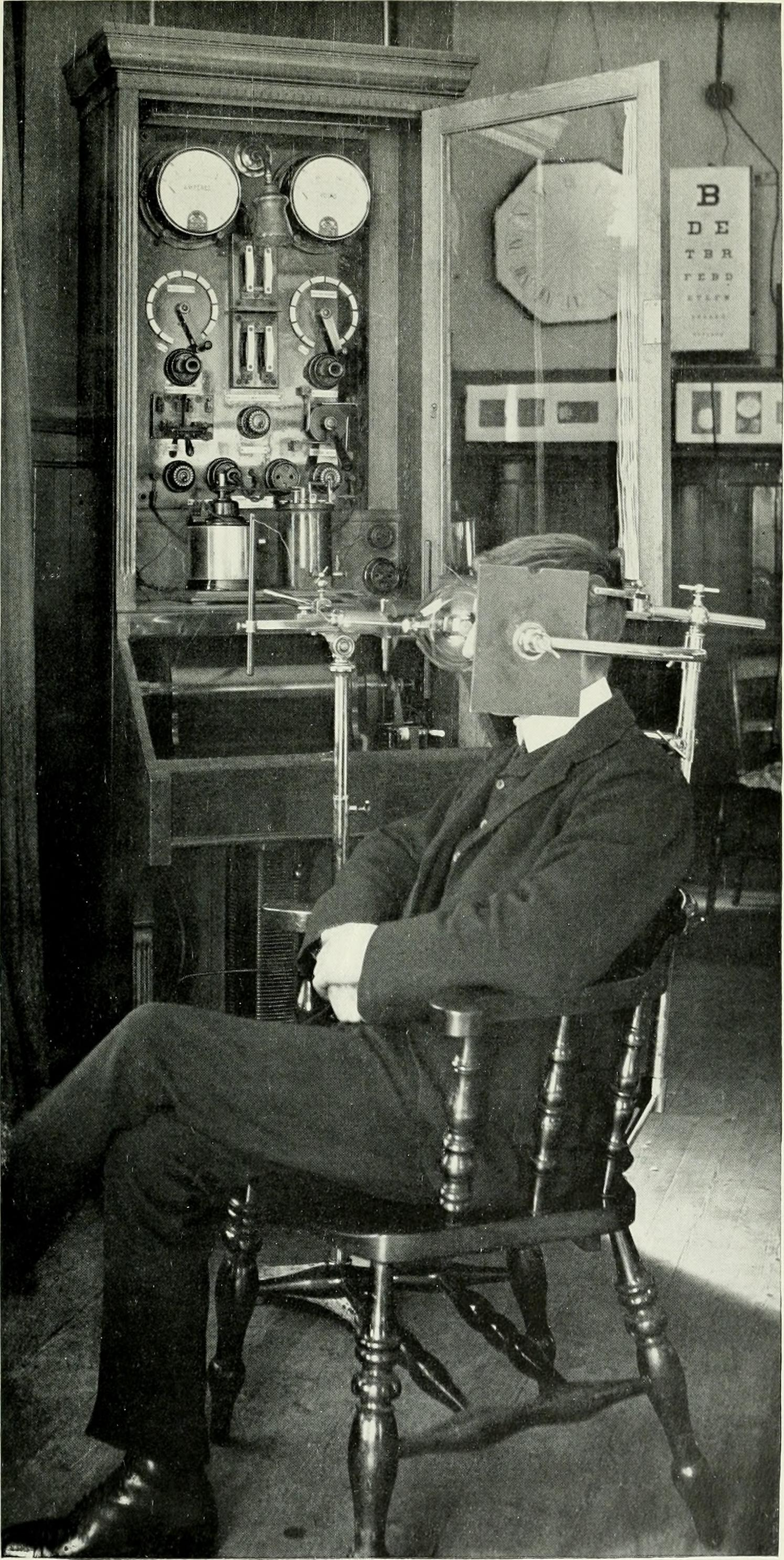
Eye injuries and their treatment (1907)

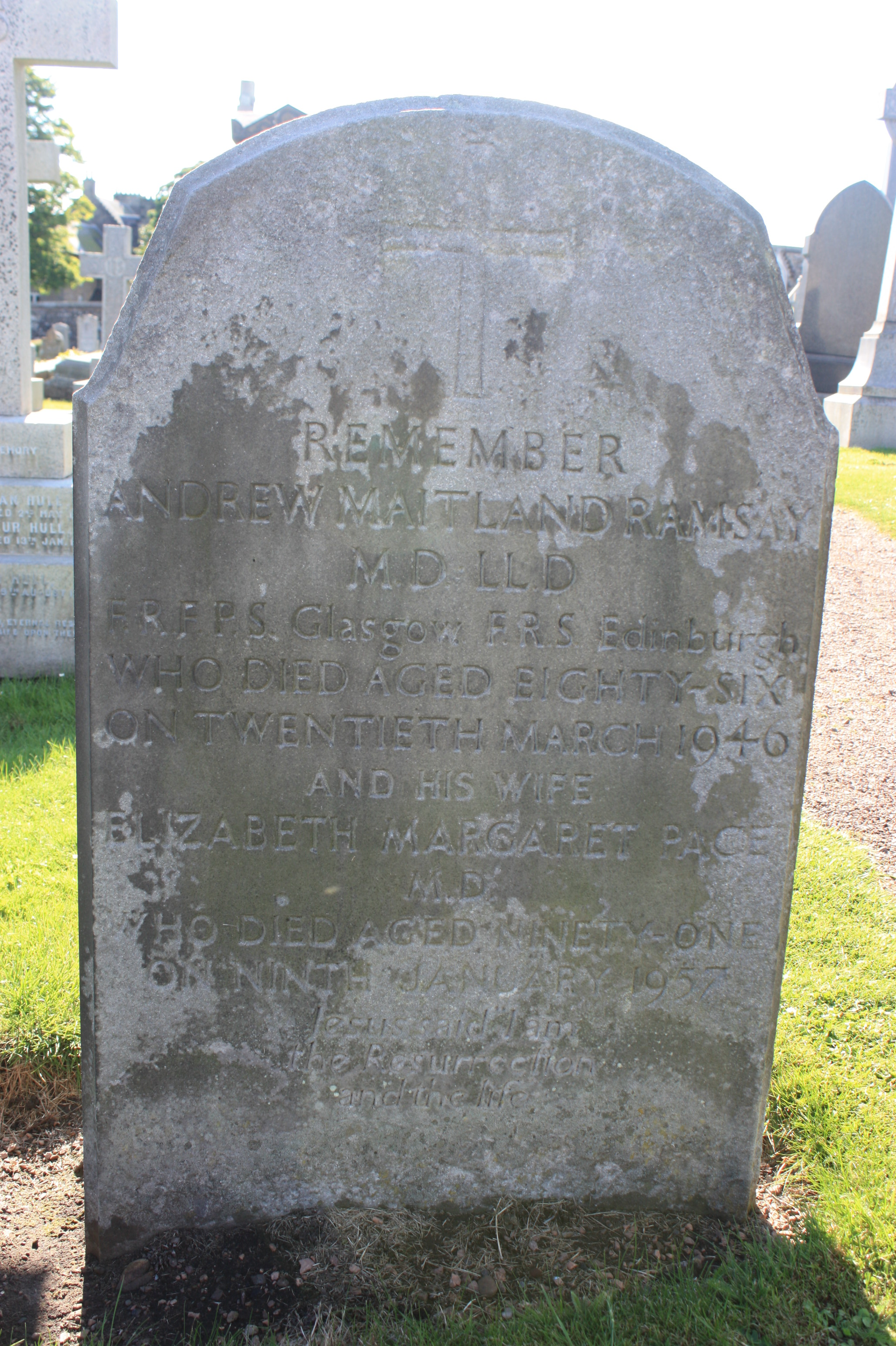
The grave of Andrew Maitland Ramsay, St Andrews Cemetery

Andrew Maitland Ramsay FRSE LLD (9 November 1859 – 20 March 1946) was a Scottish eye surgeon and medical author. He was president of the Ophthalmological Society of Great Britain 1923/24 and president of the Royal Medico-Chirurgical Society of Glasgow.

== Life ==
Ramsay was born on 9 November 1859 in Glasgow, the son of Andrew Ramsay, a clothier of 66 South Portland Street on the south side of the River Clyde. The family moved to West Lothian in his youth and he was educated at Linlithgow Burgh Grammar School. He then studied medicine at Glasgow University graduating MB ChM in 1882.

He gained practical experience at the Glasgow Western Infirmary and the Glasgow Eye Infirmary. He gained his doctorate (MD) in 1891.

In the First World War he served as a major in the Royal Army Medical Corps at the 3rd General Scottish Hospital.

He succeeded Dr Thomas Reid as lecturer in ophthalmology at Glasgow University and became professor in 1936.

In 1938 he was elected a Fellow of the Royal Society of Edinburgh. His proposers were Percy Herring, David Waterston, Robert James Douglas Graham, and Donald Esme Innes.

He retired to St Andrews at the onset of the Second World War.

He died at home in St Andrews on 20 March 1946 aged 86. He is buried in the east cemetery extension to St Andrews Cathedral churchyard.

== Family ==
In 1906, he married Dr Elizabeth Margaret Pace (1865-1957).

== Publications ==
- Injuries to the Eyeball (1889)
- Tobacco Amblyopia (1895)
- Atlas of External Diseases of the Eye (1898)
- Eye Injuries and Their Treatment (1907)
- Diathesis and Optical Diseases (1909)
- A Spectroscopic Test of Colour Vision (1909)
- Clinical Ophthalmology for the General Practitioner (1920)
- The Eye in General Medicine (1929)
- William MacKenzie: An Appreciation (1934)
