= Shops Act 1912 =

Act of the Parliament of the United Kingdom

Shops Act 1912 (Note: Section 22(1).)
- Act of Parliament
- Parliament of the United Kingdom
- Long title: An Act to consolidate the Shops Regulation Acts, 1892 to 1911.
- Citation: 2 & 3 Geo. 5 c. 3
- Territorial extent: United Kingdom

Dates
- Royal assent: 29 March 1912
- Commencement: 1 May 1912 (Note: Section 22(2).)
- Repealed: Northern Ireland: England and Wales and Scotland: 1 October 1950
Other legislation
Amends	See § Repealed enactments
Repeals/revokes	See § Repealed enactments
Amended by	Local Government Act 1933; Local Government (Scotland) Act 1947; Justices of the Peace Act 1949
Repealed by	Northern Ireland: Shops Act (Northern Ireland) 1946; England and Wales and Scotland: Shops Act 1950

Status: Repealed

Text of statute as originally enacted

The Shops Act 1912 (2 & 3 Geo. 5 c. 3) was an act of the Parliament of the United Kingdom that consolidated enactments related to the regulation of shops in the United Kingdom.

== Provisions ==
=== Repealed enactments ===
Section 22(3) of the act repealed 6 enactments, listed in that section.

Citation	Short title	Extent of repeal
55 & 56 Vict. c. 62	Shop Hours Act 1892	The whole act.
56 & 57 Vict. c. 67	Shop Hours Act 1893	The whole act.
58 & 59 Vict. c. 5	Shop Hours Act 1895	The whole act.
62 & 63 Vict. c. 21	Seats for Shop Assistants Act 1899	The whole act.
4 Edw. 7. c. 31	Shop Hours Act 1904	The whole act.
1 & 2 Geo. 5. c. 54	Shops Act 1911	The whole act.

== Subsequent developments ==
The whole act was repealed for England and Wales and Scotland by section 76(1) of, and the eighth schedule to, the Shops Act 1950 (14 Geo. 6 c. 28), which came into operation on 1 October 1950.
