= Thomas Martin Lindsay =

Scottish academic administrator (1843–1914)

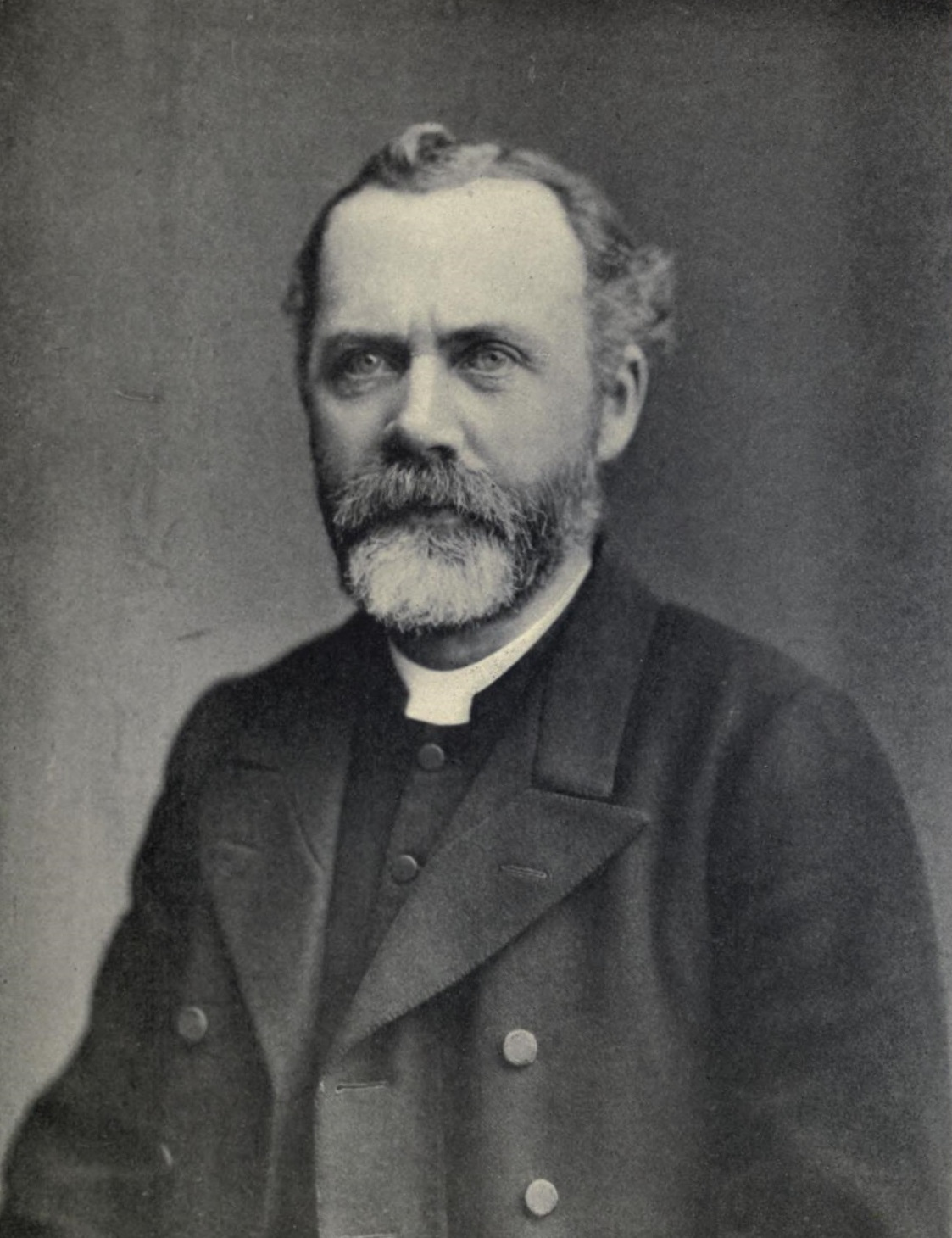
T. M. Lindsay.

Thomas Martin Lindsay, FRSE (18 October 1843 – 6 December 1914) was a Scottish historian and the professor and principal of the Free Church College, Glasgow. He wrote chiefly on church history, his major works including Luther and the German Reformation (1900), and A History of the Reformation (1906–1907).

== Early life and education ==
Lindsay was born on 18 October 1843 in Lesmahagow in Lanarkshire, the eldest son of Rev. Alexander Lindsay, and his wife, Susan Irvine Martin. He was initially educated in Lesmahagow. He then studied divinity at the Glasgow University. Finally he studied at the Edinburgh University, where he won the Ferguson Scholarship and the Shaw Fellowship and then 'worked there for a few years as an assistant to the professor of philosophy'. Soon afterwards, Lindsay took a course in ministry for the Free Church of Scotland. Having done so, in 1869 he 'acted as assistant to the minister of St. George’s Free church, Edinburgh.'

In 1871, Lindsay had published his translation of Friedrich Ueberweg's 'Logic', see Ueberweg 1871, which Scottish philosopher W.B. Gallie (1960) described as 'a monument to his industry in that capacity'. In 1872 he was appointed 'Professor of Church History' at the Free Church College, Glasgow. In the same year, he married Anna Colquhoun-Stirling-Murray Dunlop (the eldest daughter of Alexander Colquhoun-Stirling-Murray-Dunlop and Eliza Esther, née Murray), who was one of the first students at the University Classes for Women in Edinburgh, where she impressed her professors.

Lindsay's wife was one of the founders of The Glasgow Association for the Higher Education of Women. W.B. Gallie documented that she 'appears to have been a more dominating personality than her husband.' Her name was said to be synonymous with the women's movement in Scotland.

The Lindsay's children included Alexander Lindsay, 1st Baron Lindsay of Birker, who initially was the 'Professor of Moral Philosophy' in the University of Glasgow and who subsequently became the 'Master of Balliol College' and the 'Vice-Chancellor' of the University of Oxford.

== Later life ==
Between 1877 and 1881, Lindsay unsuccessfully supported William Robertson Smith in a trial for heresy which resulted in Smith's losing his position at the Aberdeen Free Church College. In 1902, Lindsay took up the position of Principal of the Free Church College. Gallie (1960) praised Lindsay on two counts. First Gallie observed that Lindsay's History of the Reformation:

'is a landmark in British historical scholarship, its most original feature, apart from its splendid impartiality and literary warmth and verve, being the inclusion of much sixteenth-century "popular" material - letters, pamphlets, broadsheets, folk-songs and the like - to provide a vivid picture of religious life, including family religious life, in Germany in the years immediately before and after Luther's revolt.'

Second Gallie observed that Lindsay gave 'his advice and assistance to ... many good and growing causes - to the Labour movement led by Ben Tillett and Tom Mann, to the problem of students' welfare in Glasgow [and] to the crofter agitation in the West Highlands'. King 1985 observed that Lindsay was a founder member of the Glasgow and West of Scotland Association for Women's Suffrage. Lindsay died in Glasgow on 6 December 1912.

== Publications ==
=== Articles ===
- Lindsay, Thomas M. (1872). "2. Note. On the Use of the Scholastic Terms Vetus Logica and Nova Logica, with a Remark upon the corresponding Terms Antiqui and Moderni". Proceedings of the Royal Society of Edinburgh. 7: 441 - 449.
- Lindsay, Thomas M. (1876). "Psychology in Holland" (PDF). Mind. 1 (1): 144-145.
- Lindsay, Thomas M. (1878). "The critical moment in the Free Church of Scotland". The Contemporary Review. 33 (August 1): 22-34.
- Lindsay, Thomas M. (1885). "Notes on education in Scotland in early days. II.—From the wars of the Bruce succession to the foundation of the University of St. Andrews". Transactions of the Glasgow Archaeological Society. 1 (New Series) (1): 32-48.
- Lindsay, Thomas M. (1903). "Family and popular religion in Germany on the eve of the Reformation". London Quarterly Review. 10 (2): 211-238.
- Lindsay, Thomas M. (1904). "A literary relic of Scottish Lollardy". The Scottish Historical Review. 1 (3): 260-273.

=== Books ===
- Lindsay, T.M. (1883). The Reformation. Edinburgh: T. & T. Clark.
- Lindsay, Thomas M. (1913a). Luther and the German Reformation. Edinburgh: T. & T. Clark.
- Lindsay, Thomas M. (1903). The Church and the Ministry in the Early Centuries (Second ed.). London: Hodder and Stoughton.
- Lindsay, M. (1907). The New Testament of our Lord Jesus Christ.
- An Oxford Bookseller in 1520 (1907)
- Englishmen and the Classical Renaissance (1909)

Lindsay was a contributor to Encyclopædia Britannica and to the Cambridge Modern History.
