= Lock hospital =

Type of hospital specializing in sexually transmitted diseases

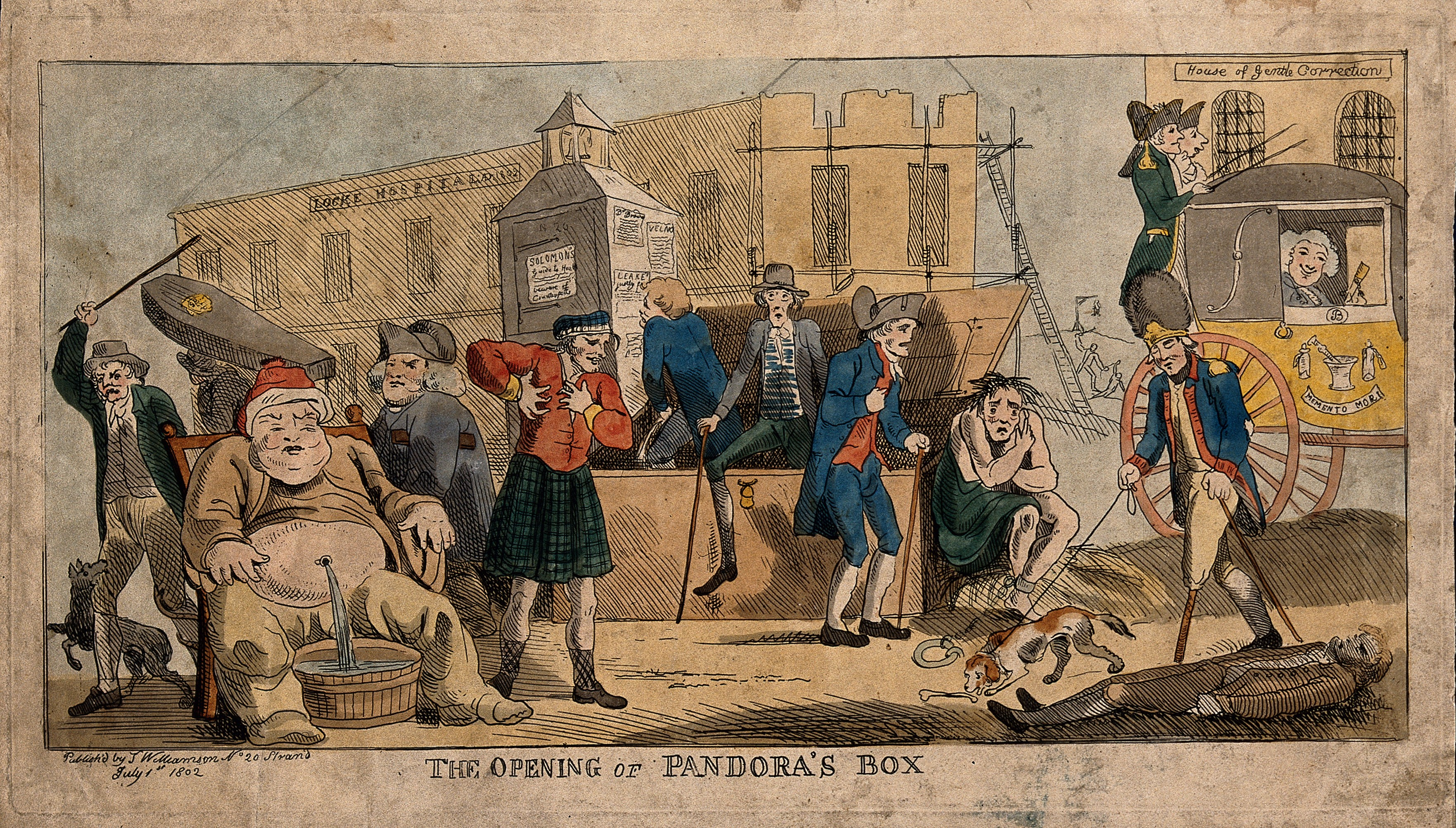
Cartoon showing inmates of a lock hospital, 1802. The man at left is undergoing paracentesis (draining of fluid from the abdomen). In the centre, one patient reads handbills for quack medicines. At right, a prosperous and smug apothecary (pharmacist) rides in a coach with footmen; his family motto is Memento mori, "remember you shall die."

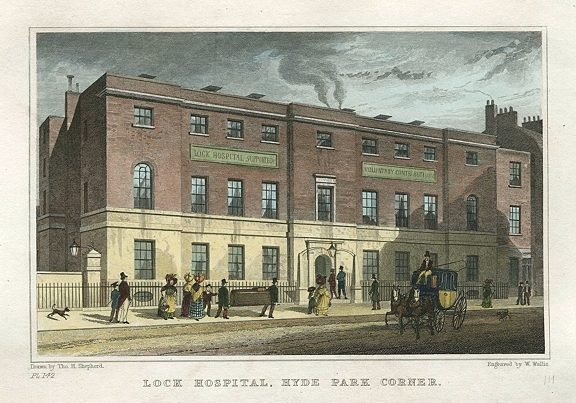
London Lock Hospital, 1831

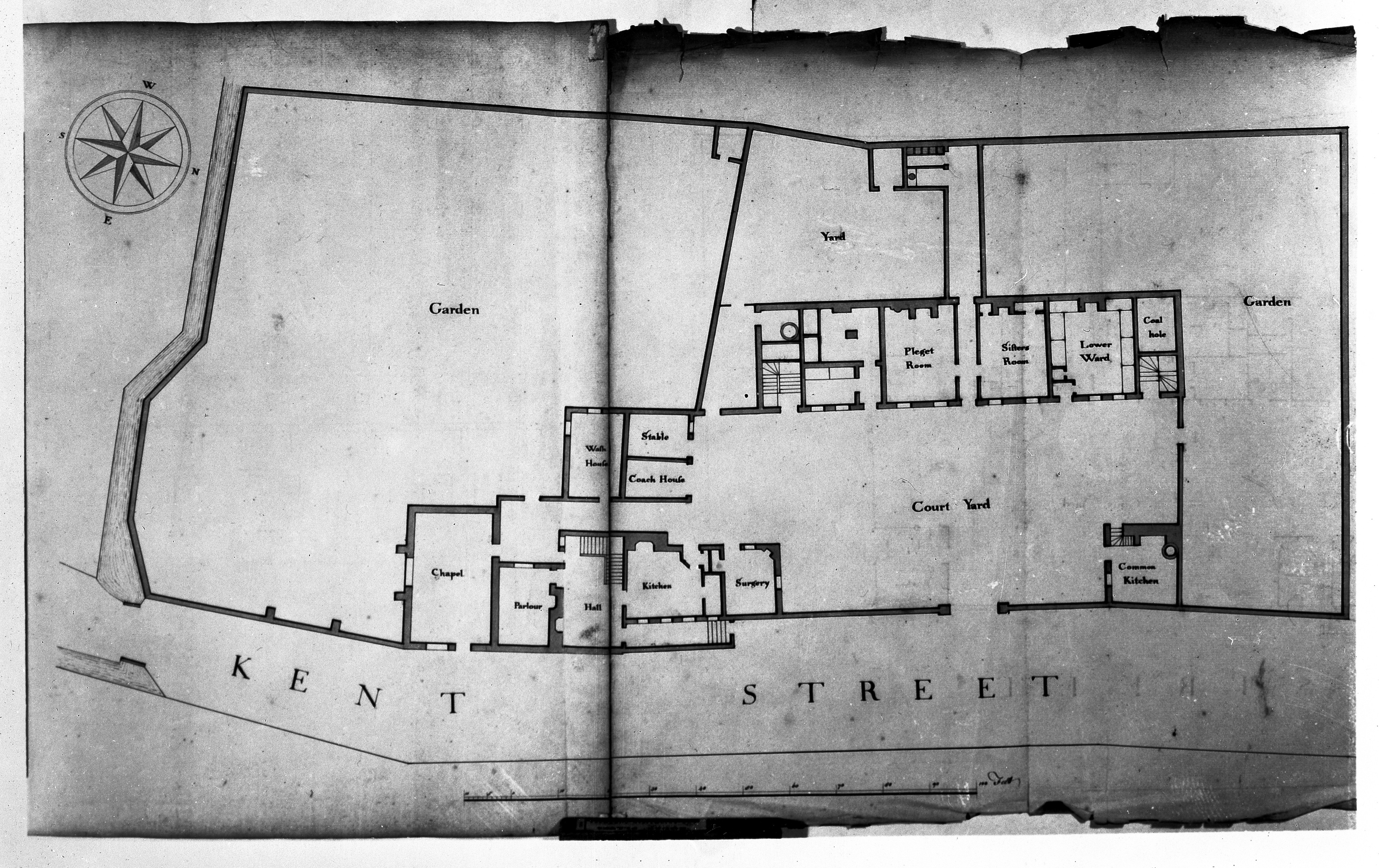
Plan of the lock hospital of Southwark: it includes a "pleget room," devoted to the changing of dressings.

A lock hospital was an establishment that specialised in treating sexually transmitted diseases. They operated in Britain and its colonies and territories from the 18th century to the 20th.

== History ==
The military had a close association with a number of the hospitals. By the mid-19th century, most of the larger army bases in India were home to a lock hospital. There were more military than civil lock hospitals in India, due to the prevalence of venereal diseases amongst British troops. In 1858, the Admiralty paid to have one opened in Portsmouth and, in 1863, another in Plymouth.

The earliest lock hospitals in India were established around 1797 at Berhampur, Kanpur, Danapur, and Fatehgarh. They were usually within bazaars, surrounded by a mud wall and staffed by a doctor and a female nurse. The local police were in charge of rounding up women suspected of being diseased, who could return home only after obtaining a certificate of discharge.

Lock Hospital operated in Hong Kong from 1858 to 1894 to deal with venereal diseases.

The term "lock hospital" originates from their use as leprosariums, after the "locks", or rags, which covered the lepers' lesions.

== See also ==
- London Lock Hospital
- Birmingham Skin and Lock Hospital
- Westmoreland Lock Hospital, Dublin
- Contagious Diseases Acts
- Glasgow Lock Hospital
