= Scottish Council for Women's Trades =

The Scottish Council for Women's Trades was an organisation in the early 1900s that campaigned for improvements in the working conditions of women. The organisation was originally formed in 1894 as the Glasgow Council for Women's Trades.

After two investigations were conducted by Margaret Irwin into the workplace conditions for female shop assistants, finding that women were being expected to work 12–17 hours per day, and being forbidden from sitting down while at work, the Glasgow Council for Women's Trades drafted a bill that would require employers to make suitable seating available to their staff. The first attempt to get the bill through the UK Parliament failed, but an immediate second attempt succeeded and the requirement for employers to provide one seat for every three shop employees became law on 1 January 1900 as the Seats for Shop Assistants Act 1899.

Margaret Irwin died in 1940; the council had been "wound up" in 1939.

== Publications ==
- 1897 Margaret Irwin. Home Work Among Women. Report of an Enquiry conducted by the Scottish Council for Women's Trades.
- 1900 Margaret Irwin. Women's Work in Tailoring and Dressmaking. Report of an Enquiry conducted by the Scottish Council for Women's Trades.
- 1910 Margaret Irwin. Home Work In Ireland. Scottish Council for Women's Trades.
