= Queen Elizabeth Hospital Birmingham =

- University Hospitals Birmingham NHS Foundation Trust
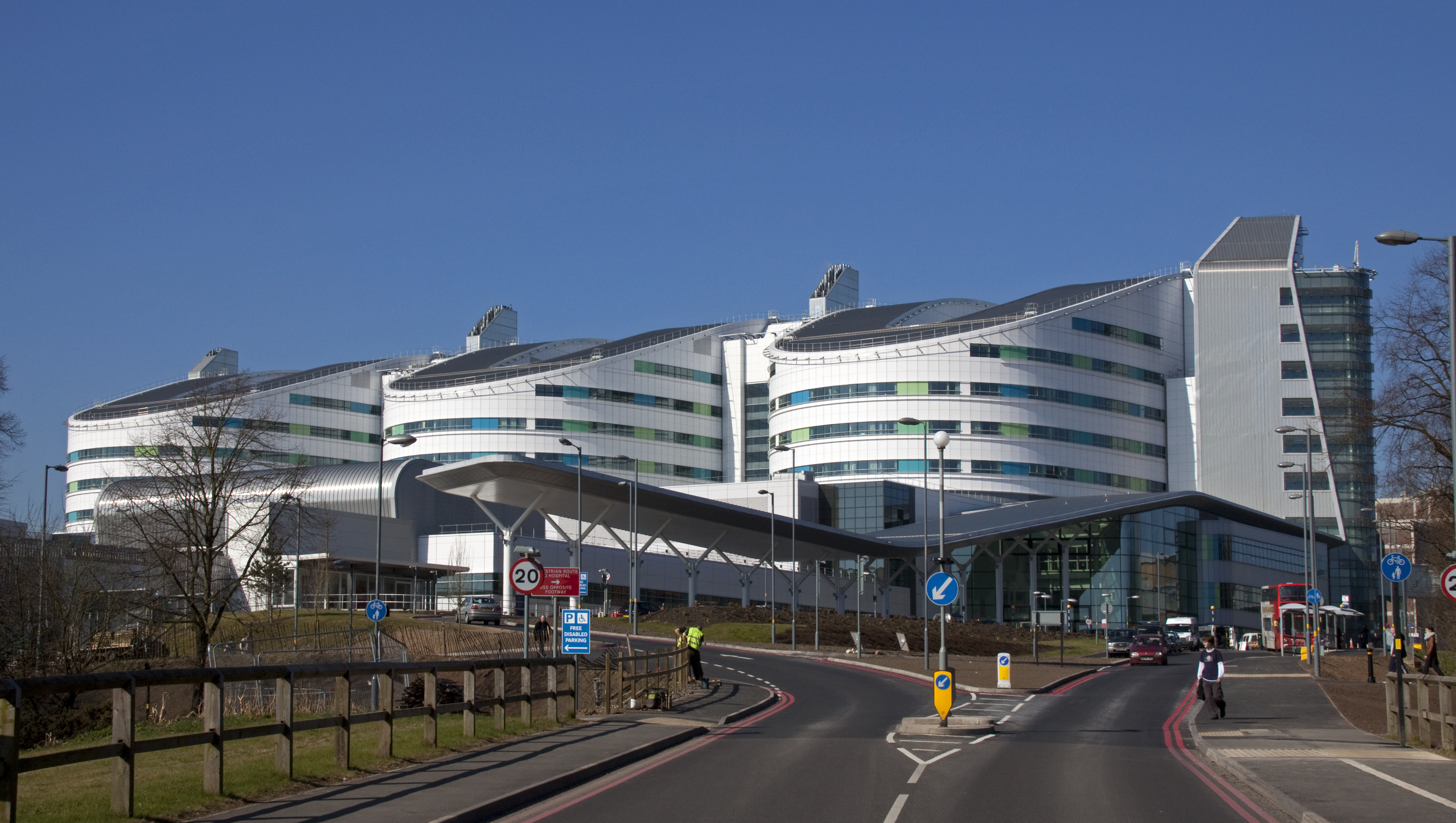
- The new Queen Elizabeth Hospital Birmingham, March 2011

- Location within West Midlands

Geography
- Location: Edgbaston, Birmingham, England
- Coordinates: 52°27′06.08″N 1°56′35.06″W

Organisation
- Care system: National Health Service
- Type: Military, Teaching, District General
- Affiliated university: University of Birmingham

Services
- Emergency department: Yes - Major Trauma Centre
- Beds: 1,215

History
- Founded: 16 June 2010; 16 years ago

Links
- Website: www.uhb.nhs.uk
- Lists: Hospitals in England

The Queen Elizabeth Hospital Birmingham is a major, 1,215 bed, tertiary NHS and military hospital in the Edgbaston area of Birmingham, situated very close to the University of Birmingham. The hospital, which cost £545 million to construct, opened on 16 June 2010, replacing the previous Queen Elizabeth Hospital and Selly Oak Hospital. It is one of the largest single-site hospitals in the United Kingdom and is part of one of the largest teaching trusts in England.

It is named after Queen Elizabeth the Queen Mother, who was queen consort and wife of King George VI from 1936 until his death in 1952.

The hospital provides a whole range of services including secondary services for its local population and regional and national services for the people of the West Midlands and beyond. The hospital has the largest solid organ transplantation programme in Europe. It has the largest renal transplant programme in the United Kingdom and it is a national specialist centre for liver, heart and lung transplantation, as well as cancer studies. The hospital has the largest single-floor critical care unit in the world with 100 beds, and is the home of the Royal Centre for Defence Medicine for military personnel injured in conflict zones.

== History ==
=== Origins ===
A variety of charitable hospitals opened in Birmingham between 1817, when the Orthopaedic Hospital opened, and 1881, when the Birmingham and Midland Skin and Lock Hospital (later Birmingham and Midland Skin and Urinary Hospital) served its first patients. One of these, Queens Hospital, established in 1840 by a young local surgeon William Sands Cox, was predominantly for clinical instruction for the medical students of Birmingham. In 1884 these institutions, including Cox's medical school, united as part of Mason College, which later became the University of Birmingham.

The original Queen Elizabeth Hospital was an NHS hospital in the Edgbaston area of Birmingham situated very close to the University of Birmingham. The building ultimately cost £1,029,057, which was £129,406 less than the money raised by donations.

=== The new hospital ===
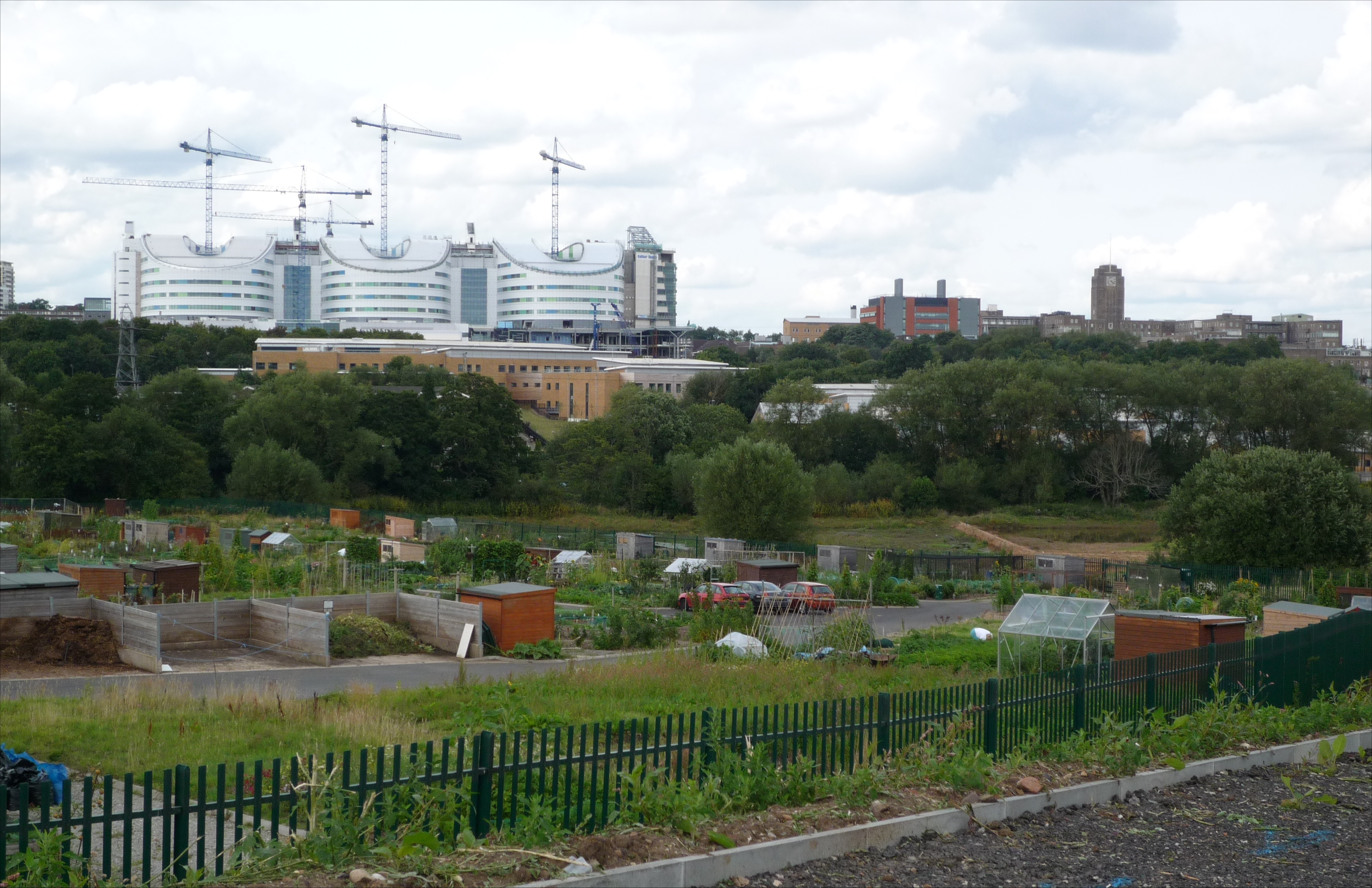
The new hospital to the left, and the old hospital to the right

The new hospital was built adjacent to the old Queen Elizabeth Hospital site. It was built to replace the Queen Elizabeth Hospital and Selly Oak Hospital, although it incorporated some of the newer parts of the old Queen Elizabeth Hospital. It was named the Queen Elizabeth Hospital Birmingham, rather than the originally planned name of Birmingham Queen Elizabeth Hospital, as the Ministry of Justice ruled that no word can precede a Royal Title.

The new hospital was part of a £1 billion urban regeneration plan for Bournbrook and Selly Oak which included the construction of a £350 million retail development and the construction of the Selly Oak bypass. Proposals for the new hospital were unveiled in 1998 and the outline design, which was unveiled in January 2004, was approved by Birmingham City Council in October 2004. It was the first acute hospital to be built in Birmingham since 1937.

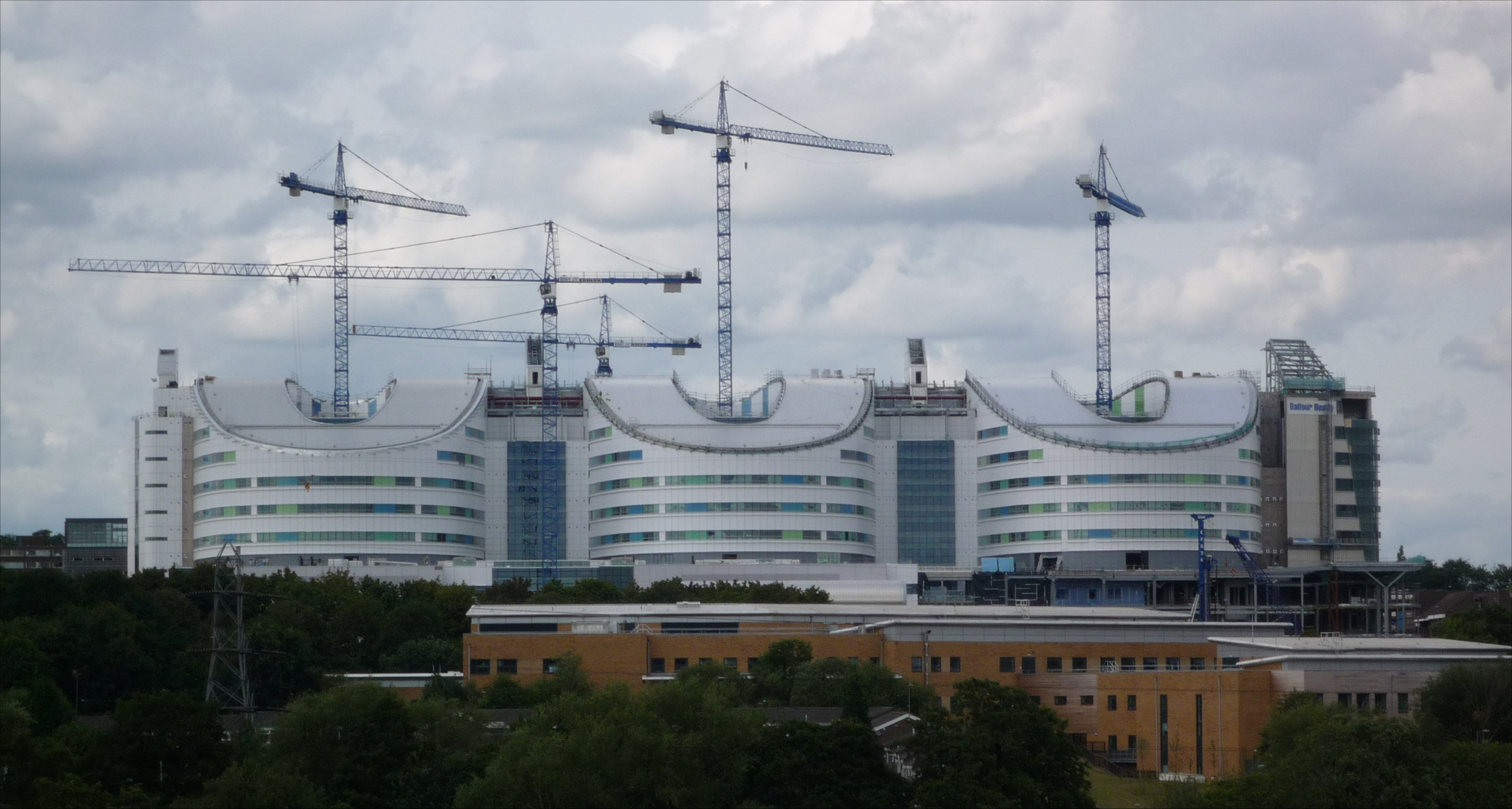
New hospital whilst under construction

The new hospital was procured under a Private Finance Initiative contract with Consort Healthcare signed in early 2006. The hospital was designed by BDP Architects and construction, which was undertaken by Balfour Beatty at a cost of £545 million, began in June 2006. Five Liebherr 280 EC tower cranes were used during construction. Three of the cranes were among the tallest free-standing structures in the UK. One of the cranes was at its maximum free-standing height, 90.2 m (295.9 ft) under the hook and could lift 12 t at 27.9 m (91.5 ft) or 4.9 t at 60 m (197 ft). The other two cranes stood at 79.5 m (260.8 ft).

The finished complex comprised three 63-metre-tall towers, each 9 stories tall. A sky-bridge was erected between one of the towers and the retained estate allowing access to the departments of oncology, the pharmacy and the Wellcome Research Centre. As well as providing patient care, provision was made for an education centre and retail outlets.

Services from Selly Oak hospital moved in during the week beginning 16 June 2010, and services from the old Queen Elizabeth Hospital finished moving in November 2011. This allowed simplification of operation due to two hospitals being relocated to one single site, which has the same capacity as the two previous hospitals combined.

The hospital is part of the University Hospitals Birmingham NHS Foundation Trust, one of the largest teaching trusts in the country and a member of the Shelford Group collaboration of the ten largest teaching and research NHS hospital trusts in England. It also hosts the National Institute for Health and Care Research (NIHR) Surgical Reconstruction and Microbiology Research Centre.

== Services ==
The hospital has 1,215 patient beds including capacity for 100 critical care beds – largest single-floor unit in the world. It also has six MRI scanners, five CT scanners, four gamma camera/SPECT-CT systems, eight ultrasound rooms, five fluoroscopy rooms and five interventional radiology suites.

=== Royal Centre for Defence Medicine ===
The hospital is the home of the 'Royal Centre for Defence Medicine' (RCDM), which cares for injured service men and women from conflict zones, as well as being a centre for research and training for Army, Navy and Air Force medical staff. Defence personnel are fully integrated with the NHS staff at the hospital, and they treat both military and civilian patients. They include doctors, nurses, therapists and support staff. The RCDM has links with the University of Birmingham Medical School, and with Birmingham City University (where the Defence School of Health Care Studies is based, which provides training for military nurses and other health professionals).

The Centre for Defence Medicine was opened by the Princess Royal in 2001 and it was awarded its Royal prefix the following year.

== Notable patients ==
Those reported to have been treated there include:

- Schoolgirl and education activist Malala Yousafzai was flown in from Pakistan to receive treatment at the hospital after being shot in the head by the Taliban in an incident which she earned plaudits across the world for her bravery and determination in recovery.
- Stephen Sutton, who raised millions of pounds for the Teenage Cancer Trust, died aged 19 from colon cancer at the hospital on 19 May 2014.

== Notable incidents ==
A nurse at the hospital was suspended from the nursing register in 2013 when a panel at the Nursing and Midwifery Council proved more than 70 charges of incompetency.

A surgeon used an argon beam machine to write his initials on the organs of the anaesthetised patients in 2013.

In 2016 the death rate among patients receiving cardiac surgery was found to be above average for the country. Among other criticisms it was suggested a bullying culture had prevented staff voicing concerns.

== Performance ==
As of October 2021 the Care Quality Commission rated the Queen Elizabeth Hospital overall as "requires improvement".

== Transport ==
The hospital is served by the nearby University railway station on the Cross City Line.

== See also ==
- Babatunde Kwaku Adadevoh
- Healthcare in West Midlands
- Birmingham Women's Hospital – located adjacent to the hospital
- List of hospitals in England
