= Glasgow Lock Hospital =

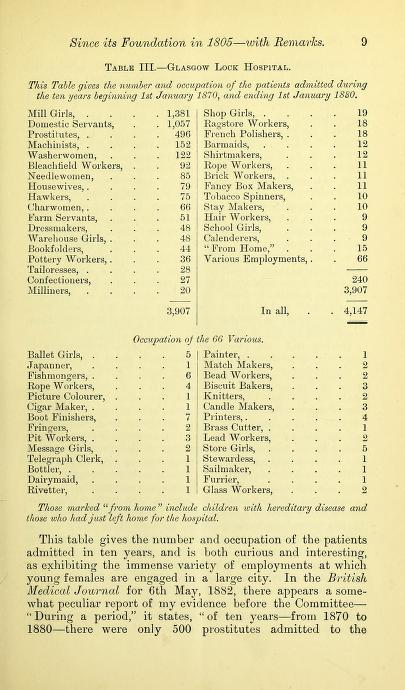
- Statistics of the Glasgow Lock Hospital from its foundation, 7 August 1805 to 31 December 1881 page 9

Geography
- Location: Glasgow, Scotland
- Coordinates: 55.861715°N 4.238422°W

History
- Opened: 1805

Links
- Lists: Hospitals in Scotland

The Lock Hospital for Women was a hospital in Glasgow for women suffering from venereal disease.

== Background ==
The Glasgow lock hospital was established in 1805 at Rottenrow Lane. It moved to 41 Rottenrow in 1845. In the 1860's, it became part of what was known as the Glasgow System and worked closely with the Glasgow Magdalen Institution.

The origin of the term 'lock' may be in the French word 'loques', meaning rags and bandages, or from 'loke' a house for lepers. Originally, the patients included women, usually those working as Prostitutes, and even children who had been infected with syphilis. The hospital depended on funding from subscribers in cash or in kind, which in 1829 included stationery, vinegar and coal. The annual report from 1814 listed a remarkable 450 subscribers.

1. "Glasgow Lock Hospital". Voluntary Hospitals Database.
2. Paterson, Alexander (December 1882). Statistics of Glasgow Lock Hospital Since its Foundation in 1805—with Remarks on the Contagious Diseases Acts, and on Syphilis (Report).
3. Glasgow Post Office Directory. 1845. p. 459.
4. Pradon, Fanette (1 December 2023). Le Système de Glasgow : le placement en institution des 'filles perdues' entre 1851 et 1901 (phdthesis thesis) (in French). Université Grenoble Alpes [2020-....]
5. Mahood, Linda (2013). The Magdalenes: Prostitution in the Nineteenth Century. Taylor and Fancis. ISBN 9780203104057.
6. "Annual Report on Glasgow Lock Hospital, 1814". SCRAN. 1814.
7. "They called it the Lock, and it was a fate worse than death". The Scotsman. 2002.
8. "Subscription Reminder for Glasgow's Lock Hospital, 1829". SCRAN.

== People associated with Glasgow Lock Hospital ==
- Alice McLaren
- Elizabeth Margaret Pace
- Alexander Patterson

James McCune Smith 1930s

== See also ==
- London Lock Hospital
- Lock hospital
- Westmoreland Lock Hospital
