= Seats for Shop Assistants Act 1899 =

Act of the Parliament of the United Kingdom

Seats for Shop Assistants Act 1899 (Note: Section 3.)
- Act of Parliament
- Parliament of the United Kingdom
- Long title: An Act to provide for Seats being supplied for the use of Shop Assistants.
- Citation: 62 & 63 Vict. c. 21
- Introduced by: 2 May 1899 (Commons); 12 June 1899 (Lords)
- Territorial extent: United Kingdom

Dates
- Royal assent: 9 August 1899
- Commencement: 1 January 1900 (Note: Section 4.)
- Repealed: 1 May 1912
Other legislation
Repealed by	Shops Act 1912

Status: Repealed

Text of statute as originally enacted

The Seats for Shop Assistants Act 1899 (62 & 63 Vict. c. 21) was an act of the Parliament of the United Kingdom that attempted to combat the practice of retail employers expecting their female employees to stand for long periods (at the time a typical working day could be longer than twelve hours) by providing at least one seat for every three female employees. The act also prescribed a fine for not complying of up to three pounds for a first offence, and a fine between one and five pounds for a second offence.

The "Seats for Shop Assistants (Scotland) Bill" was drafted by the Glasgow Council for Women's Trades, and introduced as a private member's bill by MP John McAusland Denny, first read in the House of Commons on 21 February 1899 and had its second reading on 12 April where it was debated. The bill was amended over the next two weeks and had its first reading in the House of Lords on 27 April, but at the second reading in the Lords on 4 May it was opposed by Alexander Shand, 1st Baron Shand and Prime Minister Robert Gascoyne-Cecil, 3rd Marquess of Salisbury and the bill was dropped.

However earlier that week a similar bill had been introduced into the House of Commons by MP John Lubbock, 1st Baron Avebury that would apply to England and Wales. During the committee stage MP Sir James Fergusson, 6th Baronet proposed that the bill be amended to also cover Scotland. The bill had its second reading in the House of Lords on 11 July where it was moved by Hugh Grosvenor, 1st Duke of Westminster and debated extensively. Lord Shand and the Prime Minister again argued against it, however, the second reading was put to a vote and almost three-quarters of the Lords voted in favour.

This act was repealed by the Shops Act 1911 (1 & 2 Geo. 5. c. 54) which incorporated an updated version of the text, that still required a seat for every three employees, and still prescribed the same level of fines.

The whole act was repealed by section 22(3) of the Shops Act 1912 (2 & 3 Geo. 5 c. 3), which came into force on 1 May 1912.

== See also ==
- Right to sit
