= Eleanor Stewart (trade unionist) =

Eleanor Stewart MBE
- Born: May 28, 1889; Dennistoun, Glasgow, Scotland
- Died: May 19, 1965 (aged 75)
- Known for: Trade unionist, labour activist, politician
- Political party: Labour

Stewart in 1924

Eleanor Stewart, MBE (28 May 1889 – 19 May 1965) was a Scottish trade unionist and political activist.

== Life ==
Born in Glasgow, Stewart began her working life at the age of 12, as a part-time milk carrier. She was involved in worker's rights at an early stage, being the Women's Organiser for the Worker's Union, and a voluntary worker for the National Federation of Women Workers. She was a delegate to the Scottish Trades Union Congress (STUC) in 1916. This was the Red Clydeside period, and Stewart took a leading role in a protest against the deportation of radical shop stewards from Glasgow. As a result, she was taken to court, along with Helen Crawfurd, Willie Gallacher and Emanuel Shinwell. She served as director of the Royal Maternity Hospital, and the Royal Samaritan Hospital for Women in Glasgow.

In 1917, Stewart was appointed as the Women's Organiser for the Workers' Union, and also as a member of the executive committee of the Scottish area of the Labour Party. She was involved in the Scottish Committee on Women's Training and Employment. In 1920, she was the first Labour woman to be elected to Glasgow City Council, representing Maryhill, but she lost her seat the following year. She stood in Edinburgh North at the 1924 and 1929 United Kingdom general elections, but was not elected.

The Workers' Union became part of the Transport and General Workers' Union, and Stewart continued as its Scottish women's officer, and remained active at the STUC, where she promoted equal pay and the introduction of a minimum wage. She was a founder member of its Women's Advisory Committee, which she chaired from 1933 to 1935, and from 1943 to 1948.

From 1939 to 1944, Stewart served on the National Executive Committee of the Labour Party, and she served on a variety of government committees. In 1947, she was made a Member of the Order of the British Empire.

She died in Glasgow in 1965.

Trade union offices
Preceded by Bell Jobson	Chair of the Women's Advisory Committee of the Scottish Trades Union Congress; 1933 – 1935	Succeeded by Rachel Devine
Preceded by Bell Jobson	Chair of the Women's Advisory Committee of the Scottish Trades Union Congress; 1943 – 1948	Succeeded by Agnes Gilroy
