= Alienation (speech) =

1972 speech by Jimmy Reid

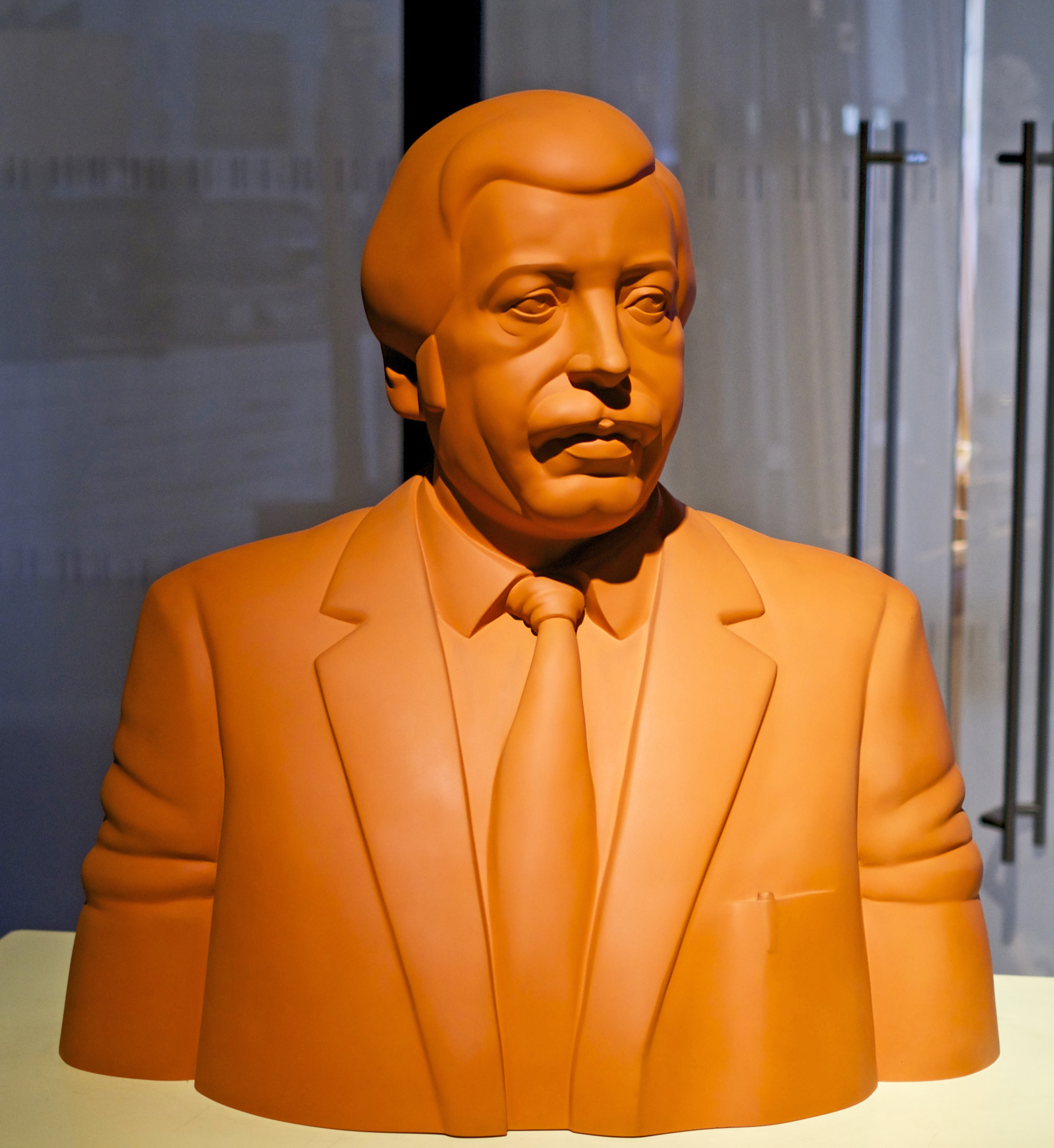
A sculpture depicting Jimmy Reid later in his career

"Alienation" (also known as the rat race speech) was Jimmy Reid's inaugural address as Rector of the University of Glasgow. Reid's election in October 1971 came during his attempt to save jobs at the Upper Clyde Shipbuilders, threatened by cuts in government subsidies. The address was delivered on 28 April 1972 to students and the university court in Bute Hall. Reid's subject was Marx's theory of alienation and he used the example of the modernisation of the Clyde shipyards which he considered risked breaking the pride workers had in their products. In one famous passage he lamented the "scrambling for position" in modern society and stated that the "rat race is for rats. We're not rats. We're human beings". The speech was reprinted in full by The New York Times and has since been referred to as one of the most outstanding speeches of the 20th century. It raised Reid's profile and led to a number of national television appearances.

== Background ==
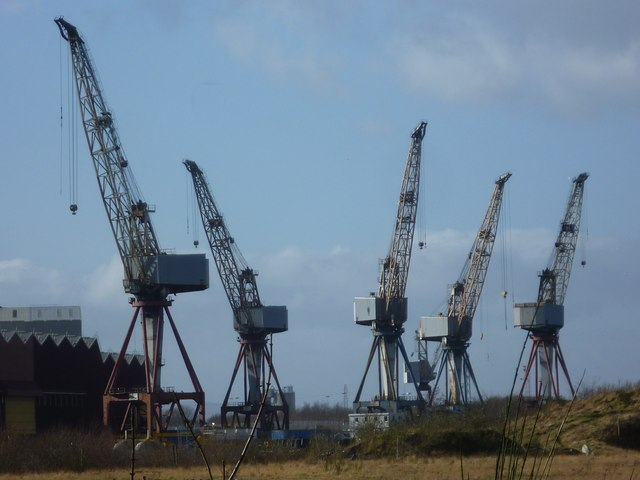
Shipbuilding cranes on the Clyde

Jimmy Reid was a shop steward of the Amalgamated Union of Engineering Workers and a member of the Communist Party of Great Britain (CPGB). As a worker at the Upper Clyde Shipbuilders (UCS), an amalgamation of five separate companies in the historic shipbuilding area of Clydeside in Glasgow, Reid opposed the proposed withdrawal of subsidies by Edward Heath's Conservative government. This would have led to the closure of most of the business and the loss of 6,000 of the 8,500 employees. Reid and other union leaders led a work-in, an alternative to a strike where the employees continued to come to work without pay to demonstrate the productivity of the yards. The work-in was well-run and eventually led to the business being restructured around two of the main yards, Govan Shipbuilders and Scotstoun Marine (a third, Yarrow Shipbuilders had previously been separated from UCS).

During the period of the work-in an election was held for the position of Rector of the University of Glasgow. The rector is the students' representative to the university authorities and is elected by the student body on a triennial basis. The position was often filled by an establishment figure, such as a peer or leading politician, and the outgoing rector was the Church of Scotland minister George MacLeod, Baron MacLeod of Fuinary. Reid had no prior involvement with the university which was traditionally middle-class and conservative in leaning; indeed it was not a member of the National Union of Students at the time as they were considered too left-wing. However, Reid considered that an election campaign would provide good publicity for his UCS proposal.

Reid's opponents in the election were former Labour minister Peggy Herbison; local Conservative MP and former minister Teddy Taylor; Liverpool poet Roger McGough and television personality Michael Parkinson; McGough and Parkinson were eliminated before the poll due to errors in their nomination paperwork. Reid stood on a platform of greater student involvement in the running of the university and promised he would appoint a student assistant to help present issues to the university's senior management. Reid was largely absent from the campaign, owing to his commitments at the UCS work-in. He had less to spend on marketing than the other candidates but his campaign may have been helped by his frequent television and radio appearances during this time.

Reid was elected to a three-year term in October 1971 with 1,458 votes; Taylor received 891 and Herbison 810. The Glasgow student president Martin Caldwell hailed the result as "a victory for the ordinary people of Clydeside against paternalism, academic snobbery, and the present government" that showed that the Glasgow students, many of whom came from the city, cared for the plight of UCS workers. The result was covered in the press which helped boost morale at the work-in and improve Reid's public image. His inaugural speech was not due until April 1972 and in the meantime Reid successfully concluded the UCS work-in. He also became involved in Glasgow student affairs, including lending his support a group of undergraduates who had been evicted from their hall of residence and opposing moves by the university to assert greater control over student funds.

== Speech ==
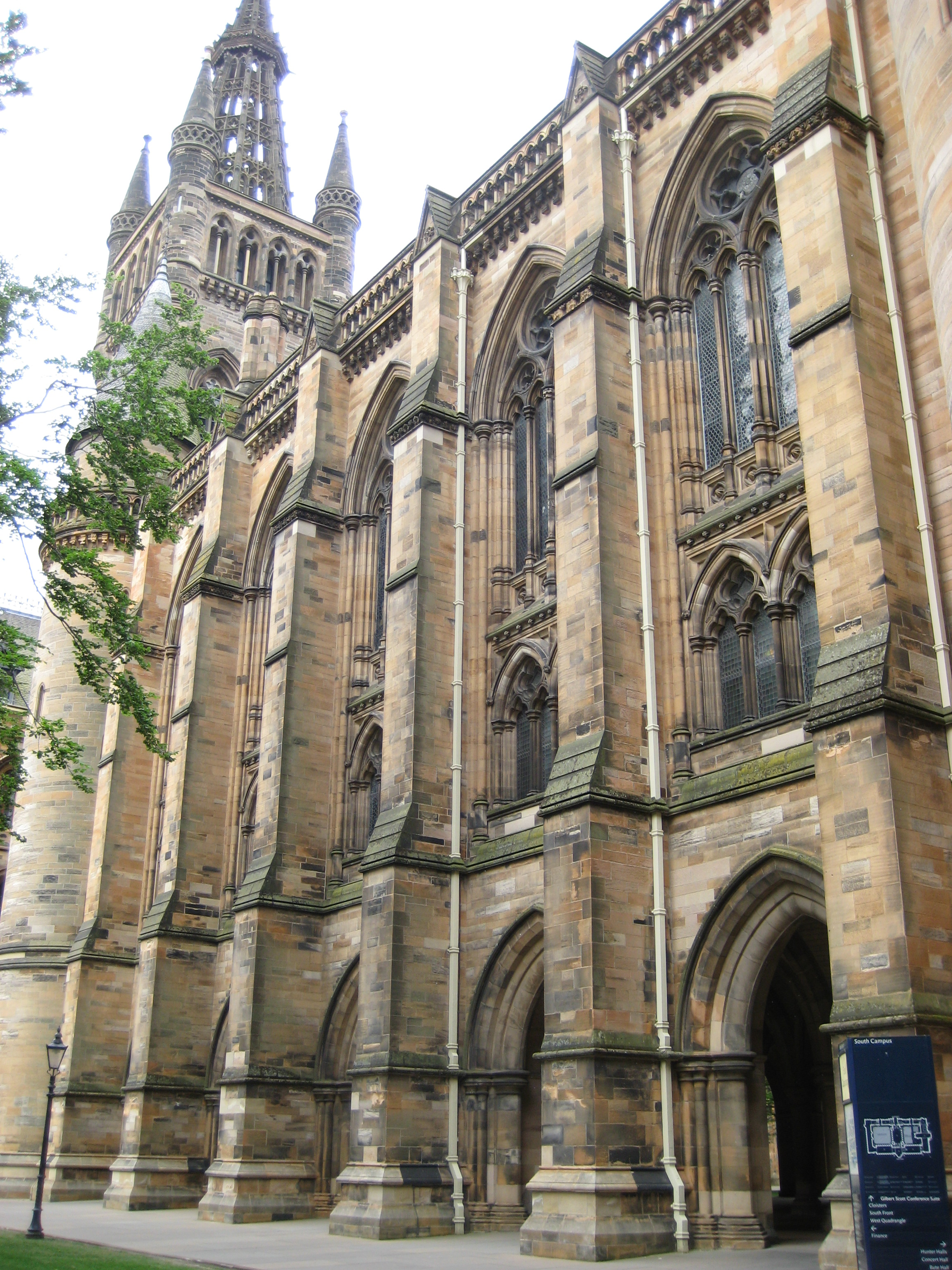
The exterior of Bute Hall

Reid's inaugural address took place in Glasgow University's Bute Hall on 28 April 1972, the same day as the government approved the rescue deal for UCS. Although some previous rectors had used professional speechwriters, Reid wrote his speech himself the day before the event. The address formed part of a grand ceremony with the university court present in academic dress; Reid wore the rector's robe and, for the first time in his life, white tie. Some disruption was caused when two students dressed as a pink pantomime horse attempted to enter the hall but otherwise Reid was not interrupted during his address, except for rounds of applause from the audience. Reid spoke in his usual working-class Clydeside accent and presented his address as a reasoned argument, not as a rabble-rousing speech. At its conclusion he received a two-minute standing ovation.

Reid's address was entitled "Alienation" and its primary subject was Marx's theory of alienation. Marx described social alienation as a consequence of the capitalist mode of production which he claimed seeks to divide society between professions and remove the individual's connection to the product of their labour. Marx thought alienation led to the working class having little understanding, control or influence of the world in which they lived, leading to indifference and passivity.

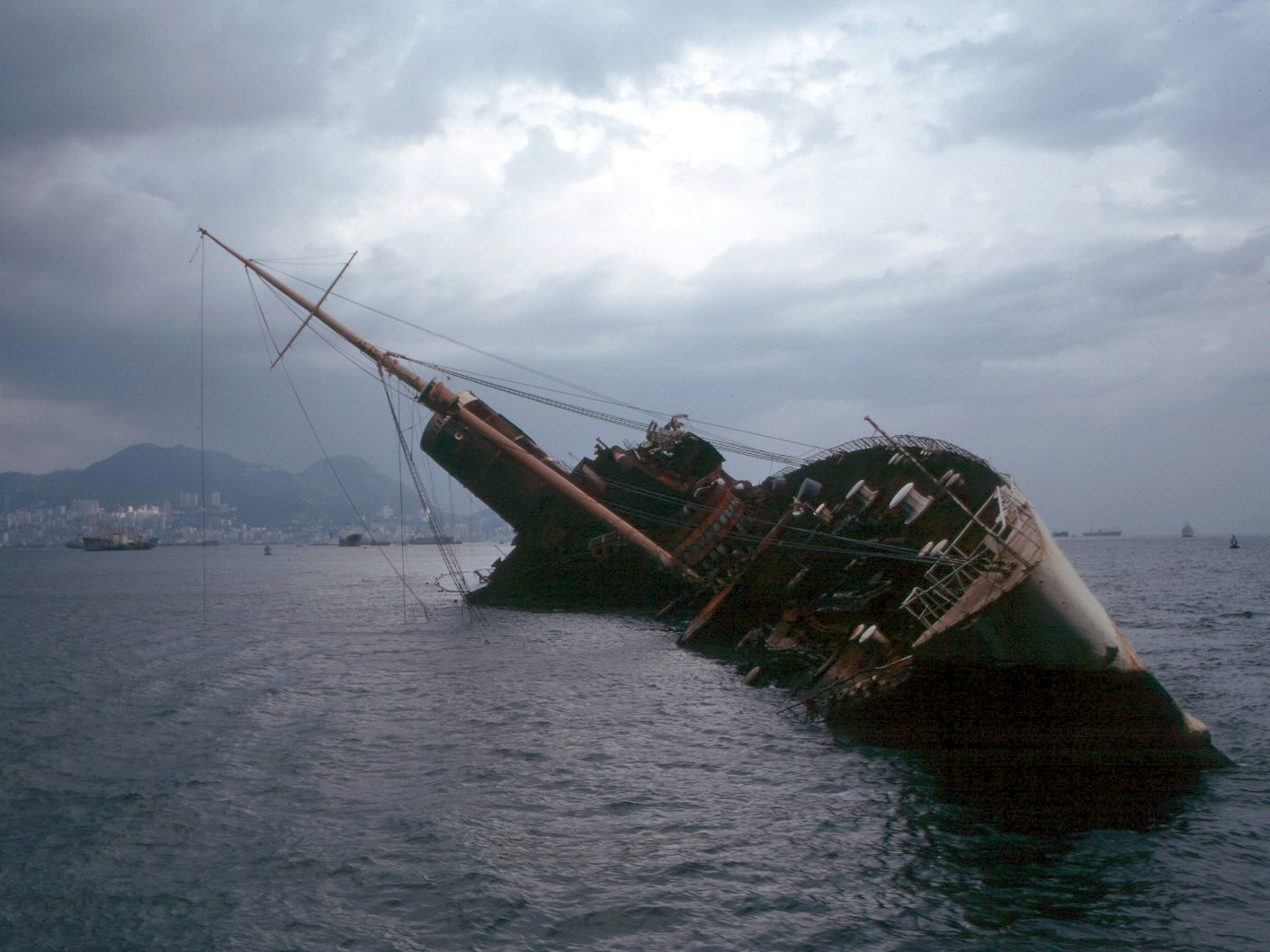
The former RMS Queen Elizabeth, wrecked in Victoria Harbour

Reid had been inspired to write on the subject of alienation after witnessing, in Connolly's Bar in Glasgow, the tearful reaction of shipyard workers to news of the sinking of the Clyde-built Seawise University (the former RMS Queen Elizabeth) in Hong Kong's Victoria Harbour on 9 January 1972. Reid thought that recent modernisation of industrial practices and the purchase of Scottish shipbuilders by English and foreign companies would lead to a loss of such a connection between workers and their products. Reid considered that the new shipyard owners lacked knowledge of the long history of shipbuilding in Scotland and were focused only on the economic benefits of largescale production and centralisation. Though he framed his argument with reference to the shipbuilding industry, Reid's address had a broader application to society as a whole. Reid stated in his address that a lack of social support by the government exacerbated alienation and its effects on young people led to anti-social behaviour and the use of drink and drugs.

Reid decried a modern society that promoted "scrambling for position, trampling on others, back-stabbing, all in the pursuit of success" and called on students to reject this, stating, "a rat race is for rats. We're not rats. We're human beings". He cautioned them that the cost of participation in such a society was the "loss of your dignity and human spirit" and quoted Jesus Christ: "what doth it profit a man if he gain the whole world and suffer the loss of his soul?". (Note: This quote seems to be taken from the 1899 Douay–Rheims Bible version of Matthew 16:26: "For what doth it profit a man, if he gain the whole world, and suffer the loss of his own soul?". The King James Version uses: "For what is a man profited, if he shall gain the whole world, and lose his own soul?" for this verse and a similar wording "For what shall it profit a man, if he shall gain the whole world, and lose his own soul?" in Mark 8:36.) Reid called for greater involvement of the people in decision making at all levels, comparing the "untapped resources" of people to those of the North Sea oil fields. He lamented wasted potential, saying "I am convinced that the great mass of our people go through life without even a glimmer of what they could have contributed to their fellow human beings. This is a personal tragedy. It is a social crime. The flowering of each individual's personality and talents is the precondition for everyone's development". Reid warned his audience not to hate the capitalists who he stated were also a product of the alienation in society. (Note: Extract from Reid's speech as published by Glasgow University: "It is easy and tempting to hate such people. However, it is wrong. They are as much products of society, and of a consequence of that society, human alienation, as the poor drop-out".)

Reid's biographers William Knox and Adam McKinlay stated that the address had a liberal, middle-class and "almost Victorian" tone in the way it espoused the virtues of public service. They note that he referenced the Christian religion, Marx and even Joseph Heller's Catch-22 and may have been inspired by the works of William Morris that he studied in his youth. Throughout the speech Reid used "we" as a mark of inclusivity and collective spirit, though he characterises the struggle against alienation as an individual contest. A few months after making the address Reid was approached by the psychiatrist R. D. Laing who praised the speech and asked him what research he had carried out to prepare for it; Reid replied that his only research was his working life spent on the Clydeside.

== Impact ==
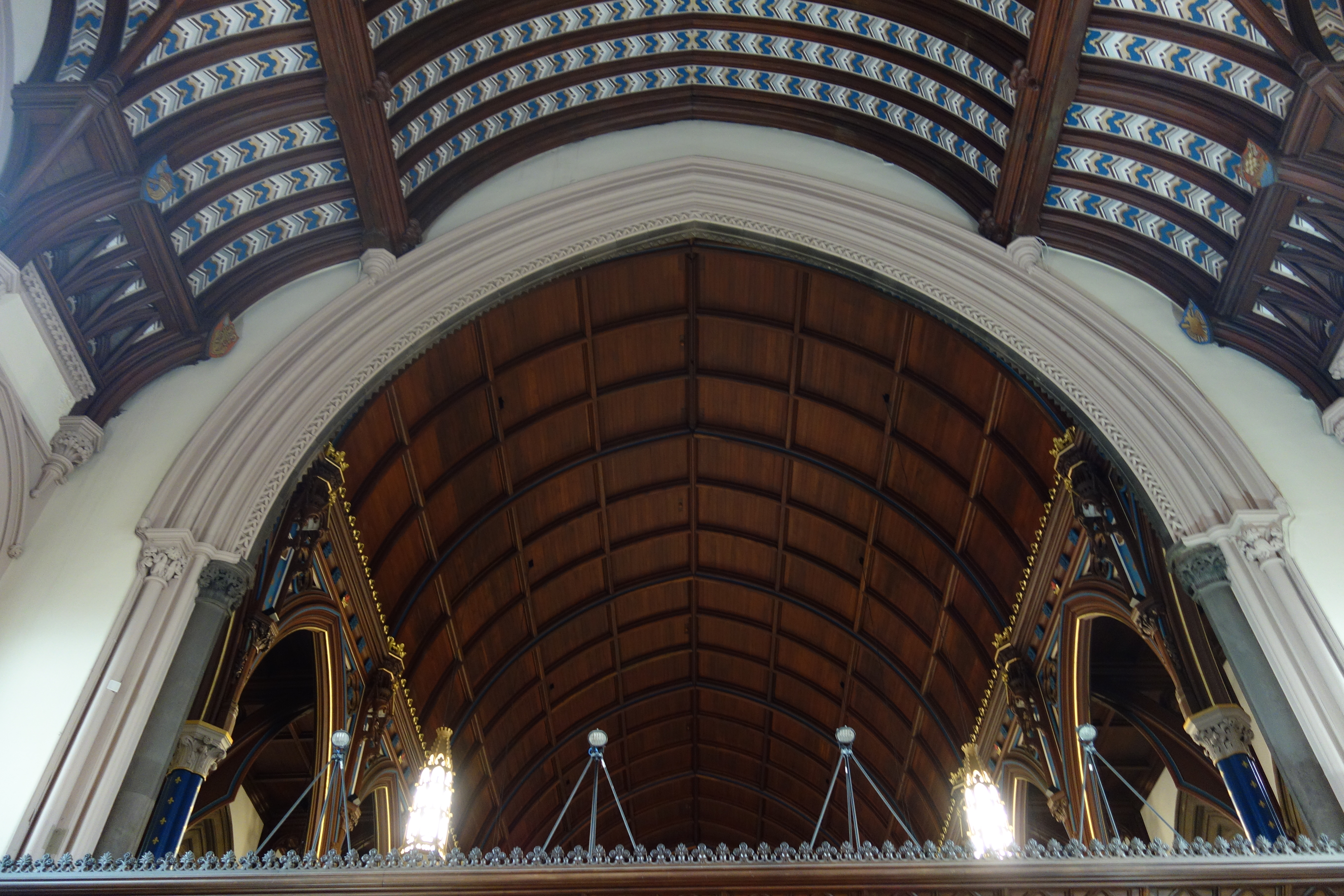
The ceiling of Bute Hall

The speech was reprinted in full in The New York Times, which hailed it as the "greatest speech since President Lincoln's Gettysburg Address". In the Glasgow newspaper The Evening Times it was afforded only 57 lines and placed lower in prominence than the council's plan to invest in a radio station and a bus that crashed into a tree. The Evening Times article was headlined "I have a dream by Rector Jim Reid", despite the fact that Reid never went by "Jim". The Glasgow Herald mentioned the speech in its editorial. The coverage of the speech helped raise Reid's profile to the highest levels of his career, and led to appearances on national television such as Open to Question in May 1972 and A Chance to Meet in November.

Reid's speech was criticised by some Trotskyist opponents, including Stephen Johns of the Socialist Labour League who stated: "this could be one of these speeches by the Archbishop of Canterbury, the Duke of Edinburgh or even a Tory. After all we are all against the 'rat race', and it would be nice if the ordinary bloke got a bit more say in things – make him feel wanted. It is noticeable that the 'communist' Reid censored all mention of capitalism, the working class, revolutionary change and socialism". Others praised the address, which was described as poetic and demonstrating Reid's intelligence. CPGB leaders praised the speech and Alex Murray told the party's Scottish Congress: "Previous Rectors, among them Gladstone, Disraeli and Sir Robert Peel, must be spinning in their graves ... It matters not as they represent the past ... that which [Reid] represents; those whom he represents – our Party, our ideas and our ideals, the working class, the youth, represent ... Scotland's future".

Reid stood for the CPGB in Central Dunbartonshire (which included Clydeside) in the February and October 1974 general elections, losing decisively to the Labour candidate both times. His term as rector ended in 1974 and he was replaced by Arthur Montford, a football commentator. Reid later moved away from the CPGB and joined Labour, for which he unsuccessfully stood in Dundee East in the 1979 general election. Afterwards, he presented a series of documentaries about the USSR on Grampian Television. He became disillusioned with New Labour and, in 2005, joined the Scottish National Party. He died in 2010.

After Reid's death the address was referred to as "a working-class hero's finest speech" by The Independent and the writer Kenneth Roy regarded it as "one of the outstanding speeches of the 20th century". Scottish Labour Party Leader Iain Gray described the address as "one of the finest political speeches of the 1970s" and the most famous portion, the phrase "a rat race is for rats", is still quoted widely decades later.

== Bibliography ==
- Crawford, Robert (2013). On Glasgow and Edinburgh. Cambridge, Massachusetts: Harvard University Press. ISBN 978-0-674-07059-2.
- Harrison, Ellie (2019). The Glasgow Effect: A tale of class, capitalism and carbon footprint. Luath Press Limited. ISBN 978-1-912387-64-9.
- Knox, W. W. J.; McKinlay, Alan (2019). Jimmy Reid: A Clyde-built man. Oxford University Press. ISBN 978-1-78962-492-2.
- MacAskill, Kenny (2017). Jimmy Reid: A Scottish Political Journey. Biteback Publishing. ISBN 978-1-78590-269-7.
- Milne, Derek L. (2012). The Psychology of Retirement: Coping with the Transition from Work. John Wiley & Sons. ISBN 978-1-118-40871-1.
- Reid, James (1972). Alienation: Rectorial Address Delivered in the University of Glasgow on Friday, 28th April, 1972 (PDF). Glasgow: University of Glasgow Publication.
- Roy, Kenneth (2015). The Invisible Spirit: A Life of Post-War Scotland 1945-75. Birlinn. ISBN 978-0-85790-811-7.
