= Aircraft and Shipbuilding Industries Act 1977 =

Act of the Parliament of the United Kingdom

Aircraft and Shipbuilding Act 1977 (Note: Section 57(1).)
- Act of Parliament
- Parliament of the United Kingdom
- Long title: An Act to provide for the establishment of two bodies corporate to be called British Aerospace and British Shipbuilders, and to make provision with respect to their functions; to provide for the vesting in British Aerospace of the securities of certain companies engaged in manufacturing aircraft and guided weapons and the vesting in British Shipbuilders of the securities of certain companies engaged in shipbuilding and allied industries; to make provision for the vesting in those companies of certain property, rights and liabilities; to provide for payments to British Aerospace and its wholly owned subsidiaries, for the purpose of promoting the design, development and production of civil aircraft; and for connected purposes.
- Citation: 1977 c. 3
- Introduced by: Secretary of State for Industry Tony Benn 30 April 1975 (Commons)
- Territorial extent: United Kingdom (Note: Section 57(2).)

Dates
- Royal assent: 17 March 1977
- Commencement: 17 March 1977 (Note: The Acts of Parliament (Commencement) Act 1793.)
- Repealed: 26 May 2015

Other legislation
- Amended by: British Aerospace Act 1980; Overseas Development and Co-operation Act 1980; British Shipbuilders Act 1983; Tribunals and Inquiries Act 1992; Statute Law (Repeals) Act 1998; Statute Law (Repeals) Act 2004
- Repealed by: Deregulation Act 2015

Status: Repealed

Text of statute as originally enacted

Revised text of statute as amended

The Aircraft and Shipbuilding Industries Act 1977 (c. 3) was an act of the Parliament of the United Kingdom that nationalised large parts of the UK aerospace and shipbuilding industries and established two corporations, British Aerospace and British Shipbuilders (s.1).

Nationalisation of the two industries had been a manifesto commitment of the Labour Party in the February 1974 United Kingdom general election and was part of the programme of the 1974–1979 Labour government. It met immediate opposition from the industries, including from Labour politician and Vickers chairman Lord Robens.

The nationalisation was announced in July 1974 but the compensation terms were not announced until March 1975. The bill had its first reading on 30 April 1975 but ran out of parliamentary time in that session. Subsequent bills had a stormy passage through Parliament. Ship repairing was originally included in its scope but removed because of the findings of examiners that the bill was hybrid. The bill was rejected by the House of Lords on three occasions. Michael Heseltine used the mace in the House of Commons to show his outrage at the Labour Party winning the final vote due in part to its failure to comply with the traditional requirements of a parliamentary pair.

== List of assets subsumed by British Aerospace ==
The assets of the following companies vested in British Aerospace on 29 April 1977 (ss.19(1) and 56(1)/ Sch.1):

- British Aircraft Corporation
- Hawker Siddeley Aviation
- Hawker Siddeley Dynamics
- Scottish Aviation

== List of assets subsumed by British Shipbuilders ==
The assets of the following companies vested in British Shipbuilders on 1 September 1977 (ss.19(1) and 56(1)/ Sch.2):

=== Shipbuilders ===
- Ailsa Shipbuilding Company, Troon (acquired in 1978, merged with Ferguson Shipbuilders in 1981 to form Ferguson-Ailsa)
- Appledore Shipbuilders, Appledore
- Austin & Pickersgill, Sunderland
- Brooke Marine, Lowestoft
- Cammell Laird Shipbuilders, Birkenhead
- Clelands Shipbuilding Company, Wallsend
- Ferguson Shipbuilders, Port Glasgow (merged with Ailsa in 1981 to form Ferguson-Ailsa)
- Goole Shipbuilding & Repairing Company, Goole
- Govan Shipbuilders, Govan
- Hall, Russell & Company, Aberdeen
- Robb Caledon Shipbuilders, (comprising Henry Robb, Leith and Caledon Shipbuilding & Engineering Company, Dundee)
- Scott Lithgow, Greenock (comprising Scotts Shipbuilding and Engineering Company & Lithgows)
- Smiths Dock Company, Middlesbrough
- Sunderland Shipbuilders, Sunderland (incorporating William Doxford & Sons, Pallion)
- Swan Hunter Shipbuilders Limited, Wallsend (later renamed Swan Hunter) – also incorporating John Readhead & Sons, South Shields and Wallsend Slipway and Engineering Company, Wallsend
- Vickers Limited Shipbuilding Group, Barrow in Furness (renamed Vickers Shipbuilding and Engineering Limited – VSEL)
- Vosper Thornycroft, Woolston and Portsmouth
- Yarrow Shipbuilders (YSL), Scotstoun

=== Marine diesel manufacturers ===
- Barclay Curle and Company, Whiteinch
- George Clark & NEM, Sunderland
- Hawthorn Leslie and Company, Hebburn
- John G. Kincaid & Company, Greenock

Note: Harland and Wolff, Belfast had been state-owned since 1975, but did not become part of British Shipbuilders.

== Compensation ==
Section 35 of the act provided for compensation to the original owners. Compensation was to be by government bonds against a valuation of the shares over a relevant period of six months up to the Labour Party's election on 28 February 1974. For companies listed on the London Stock Exchange, this was the average quoted price over the relevant period. For non-listed shares, the government would negotiate with a shareholders' representative to establish a hypothetical market valuation. If no agreement was reached, the shareholders had recourse to arbitration (ss.36–41). However, section 39 controversially included a provision to make deductions from this base value if a company had dissipated its assets by declaring dividends in anticipation of nationalisation, or by other means.

=== Aircraft and Shipbuilding Industries Arbitration Tribunal ===
Section 42 of the act established the Aircraft and Shipbuilding Industries Arbitration Tribunal to hear appeals over valuation but not challenges to the fairness of the statutory formula. The tribunal was governed by rules made respectively by the Lord Advocate for Scotland and the Lord Chancellor for the remainder of the UK. There was a right of appeal to the Court of Session in Scotland and to the Court of Appeal in the remainder of the UK (Sch.7), with a possible further appeal to the House of Lords. There was also provision for judicial review of the original compensation offer.

Having been described, in 2006, by the Council on Tribunals as "rarely convened/moribund", the tribunal was abolished in March 2013 under the UK Government's public bodies reforms.

=== European Court of Human Rights ===
The Conservative Party had been critical of the compensation proposals but, after being elected in the 1979 United Kingdom general election did not change the arrangements. All shareholders had been paid out by the end of 1980. In 1980 unsuccessful applications to the European Court of Human Rights over the compensation were made by Vosper, Vickers, Yarrow and shareholders including English Electric, M&G Securities, Prudential, and Sir William Lithgow.

They complained, in the end unsuccessfully, that the compensation scheme breached several articles of the European Convention on Human Rights, namely:

- Art.1 of Protocol 1, right to peaceful enjoyment of one's possessions;
- Art.6(1), right to a fair trial;
- Art.13, right to an effective remedy;
- Art.14, prohibition of discrimination;
- Art.17, prohibition of abuse of rights;
- Art.18, limitations on permitted restrictions of rights.

== Sources ==
- Whitaker's Almanack 1978, pp356–365
- Norton, P. M. (1991). "A law of the future or a law of the past? Modern tribunals and the International law of expropriation". American Journal of International Law. 85 (3): 474–505. doi:10.2307/2203108. JSTOR 2203108. S2CID 144989903.
- Lithgow and Others, in Lauterpacht, E. (1987) International Law Reports, London: Cambridge University Press, ISBN 0-949009-08-3, pp438–536
