= Starflight (disambiguation) =

Starflight may refer to:

- Starflight, a science fiction computer game set in the 47th century
- Starflight: The Plane That Couldn't Land, a television movie
- "Starflight", a song by After the Fire on their album Der Kommissar
- MV-1 Starflight, a passenger aircraft made by Monsted-Vincent
- Interstellar travel
- Starflight, the first book in the Starflight duology by Melissa Landers
- Travis County STAR Flight, a public emergency helicopter service in Austin, Texas.
- Starflight, a protagonist of Wings of Fire
