= British Shipbuilders =

1977–2013 British public corporation

- Industry: Shipbuilding; Marine engineering Naval architecture
- Founded: 1 September 1977
- Defunct: 1989 (De facto); 2013 (De jure)
- Fate: Assets liquidated
- Headquarters: Newcastle upon Tyne, England
- Number of employees: 87,000 (1977); 62,000 (1982); 5,000 (1987)

British Shipbuilders (BS) was a public corporation that owned and managed the shipbuilding industry in Great Britain from 1977 to the end of the 1980s. Its head office was at Benton House in Newcastle upon Tyne, England.

== History ==
The corporation was founded as a result of the Aircraft and Shipbuilding Industries Act 1977, which nationalised 27 major shipbuilding and marine engineering companies in Great Britain. A further six ship repair companies and a further shipyard were also acquired by the corporation, with British Shipbuilders initially comprising 32 shipyards, six marine engine works and 6 general engineering plants. Collectively, British Shipbuilders accounted for 97% of the UK's merchant shipbuilding capacity, 100% of its warship-building capacity, 100% of slow speed diesel engine manufacturing and approximately 50% of ship-repair capacity. Harland & Wolff, the only shipbuilder based in Northern Ireland, was deemed to be a special political case and remained out of the control of the British Shipbuilders' management, despite it also being in state ownership from 1977.

The same act nationalised the three large UK aerospace companies and grouped them in an analogous corporation, British Aerospace.

=== Leadership and organisation ===
The first Chairman of British Shipbuilders, serving from 1977 to 1980, was Admiral Sir Anthony Griffin. He was succeeded by Sir Robert Atkinson, who in turn was succeeded by Graham Day in 1984, Phillip Hares in 1986. The final operational chairman, John Lister, took office in 1987, continuing until 1989.

The company was initially organised into four operating divisions: Merchant, Naval, Ship-repair, Marine Engineering and General Engineering. This was restructured into five trading divisions in 1980: Merchant Shipbuilding, Warship-building, Engineering, Ship-repair and Offshore.

=== Privatisation ===
British Shipbuilders Act 1983 (Note: Section 3(1).)
- Act of Parliament
- Parliament of the United Kingdom
- Long title: An Act to make further provision with respect to the functions and activities of British Shipbuilders.
- Citation: 1983 c. 15
- Territorial extent: United Kingdom (Note: Section 3(5).)

Dates
- Royal assent: 9 May 1983
- Commencement: 9 July 1983 (Note: Section 3(4).)
- Repealed: 22 March 2013

Other legislation
- Amends: Aircraft and Shipbuilding Industries Act 1977
- Repealed by: Public Bodies (Abolition of British Shipbuilders) Order 2013 (SI 2013/687)

Status: Repealed

Text of statute as originally enacted

Revised text of statute as amended

Text of the British Shipbuilders Act 1983 as in force today (including any amendments) within the United Kingdom, from legislation.gov.uk.

By the end of 1982, British Shipbuilders had closed half of its shipyards in an effort to reduce over-capacity. The terms of the British Shipbuilders Act 1983 (c. 15) then required the company to begin a process of privatising its remaining assets. The various divisions that had remained under integrated nationalised ownership were divested throughout the 1980s as the company wound up operations. The profitable warship-builders were sold off initially, with the merchant shipyards sold off or closed on a piecemeal basis, culminating in the sale of Govan Shipbuilders to Kværner in 1988 and Ferguson Shipbuilders to the privatised marine engine builder, Clark Kincaid, in January 1989. British Shipbuilders finally ceased active shipbuilding operations in 1989, with the closure of its last shipyards: North East Shipbuilders Ltd.'s Pallion and Southwick Shipyards at Sunderland. The remaining assets of North East Shipbuilders Ltd. were then privatised.

=== Abolition ===
British Shipbuilders continued to exist as a shell corporation in statute, in order to be accountable for any liabilities incurred during its operational history, until it was abolished in 2013 as part of the government's 2010 public bodies reforms. From March 2013 any remaining liabilities of British Shipbuilders passed to the Department for Business, Innovation and Skills.

== Assets subsumed by British Shipbuilders ==
The assets of the following companies vested in British Shipbuilders on 1 September 1977.

=== Shipbuilders and ship repairers ===
- Ailsa Shipbuilding Company, Troon (acquired in 1978, merged with Ferguson Shipbuilders in 1981 to form Ferguson-Ailsa)
- Appledore Shipbuilders, Appledore (merged with Harland & Wolff in 2020 to form Harland & Wolff (Appledore))
- Austin & Pickersgill, Sunderland
- Brooke Marine, Lowestoft
- Cammell Laird Shipbuilders, Birkenhead
- Clelands Shipbuilding Company, Wallsend
- Falmouth Docks Company, Falmouth
- Ferguson Shipbuilders, Port Glasgow (initially a subsidiary of Scott Lithgow, merged with Ailsa in 1981 to form Ferguson-Ailsa, then with Appledore Shipbuilders in 1986 to form Appledore-Ferguson)
- Goole Shipbuilding & Repairing Company, Goole
- Govan Shipbuilders, Govan, Glasgow (incorporating Scotstoun Marine)
- Hall, Russell & Company, Aberdeen
- Harland & Wolff, Belfast
- River Thames Ship Repairers, Blackwall (later renamed Blackwall Engineering)
- Robb Caledon Shipbuilders, (comprising Henry Robb, Leith and Caledon Shipbuilding & Engineering Company, Dundee)
- Scott Lithgow, Greenock (comprising Scotts Shipbuilding and Engineering Company & Lithgows)
- Smiths Dock Company, Middlesbrough
- Sunderland Shipbuilders, Sunderland (incorporating William Doxford & Sons, Pallion)
- Swan Hunter Shipbuilders Limited, Wallsend (later renamed Swan Hunter) - also incorporating John Readhead & Sons, South Shields, Wallsend Slipway and Engineering Company, Wallsend and Grangemouth Dockyard Company
- Vickers Limited Shipbuilding Group, Barrow in Furness (renamed Vickers Shipbuilding and Engineering Limited - VSEL)
- Vosper Thornycroft, Woolston and Portsmouth
- Yarrow Shipbuilders (YSL), Scotstoun, Glasgow

=== Marine diesel engine manufacturers ===
- Barclay Curle and Company, Whiteinch, Glasgow
- George Clark & NEM, Sunderland
- Hawthorn Leslie and Company, Hebburn
- John G. Kincaid & Company, Greenock
- Scotts Shipbuilding & Engineering Company, Greenock

Note: Harland and Wolff, Belfast was state-owned but did not form part of British Shipbuilders.

== Privatisation ==
- Scott Lithgow (Offshore Division) - 1981 - individual operating companies dissolved, sold to Trafalgar House in 1984, closed 1993.
- Brooke Marine (Merchant Division) - 1985 - management buyout. Ceased trading in 1992.
- Vosper Thornycroft (Warship Division) - 1985 - management buyout, known as VT Group until 2008, now BAE Systems Surface Ships.
- Yarrow Shipbuilders (Warship Division) - 1985 - sold to GEC-Marconi as Marconi Marine (YSL) then to BAE Systems as part of BAE Systems Marine, now BAE Systems Surface Ships.
- VSEL (Warship Division) - 1986 - employee buyout, with Cammell Laird as a subsidiary. Acquired by GEC-Marconi in 1995 as part of Marconi Marine, then to BAE Systems as part of BAE Systems Marine, now BAE Systems Submarine Solutions.
- Cammell Laird (Warship Division) - 1986 - as a subsidiary of VSEL, finished shipbuilding in 1993, continuing as ship-repair firm in different ownership. Cammell Laird resumed shipbuilding in 2012.
- Ailsa Shipbuilders (Merchant Division) - 1986 - Ailsa split from merged BS subsidiary Ferguson-Ailsa and sold to Perth Corporation as Ailsa Perth Shipbuilders. Ceased shipbuilding in 1988.
- Hall Russell (Warship Division) - 1986 - management buyout, later acquired by A&P Appledore International in 1989, closed 1992.
- Swan Hunter (Warship Division) - 1987 - management buyout, entered receivership 1994, bought by Jaap Kroese. Ceased shipbuilding, 2006.
- Govan Shipbuilders (Merchant Division) - 1988 - sold to Kværner as Kværner Govan, to GEC-Marconi 1999 as part of Marconi Marine then to BAE Systems as part of BAE Systems Marine, now BAE Systems Surface Ships.
- Ferguson Shipbuilders (Merchant Division) - 1989 - demerged from Appledore-Ferguson sold to Clark Kincaid (HLD Group) in 1989.
- Appledore Shipbuilders (Merchant Division) - 1989 - demerged from Appledore-Ferguson and sold to Langham Industries.
- Clark Kincaid (Engineering Division) - 1989 - management buyout (HLD Group), later acquired by Kværner in 1990. Kværner Kincaid sold to Scandiaverken in 1999 and ceased manufacturing in 2000.
