= John G. Kincaid & Company =

British marine engine manufacturer from 1881 to 1978

- Industry: Marine engineering
- Predecessor: Hastie, Kincaid and Donald
- Founded: 1881
- Defunct: 1978
- Fate: Nationalised and incorporated into British Shipbuilders in 1977, merged with Clark-Hawthorn 1984
- Successors: Clark-Kincaid, Kvaerner Kincaid
- Headquarters: Greenock, Scotland
- Products: Boilers, marine engines

John G. Kincaid & Company was a major British marine engine manufacturer based at the mouth of the River Clyde in Greenock, Inverclyde, Scotland.

Its predecessor, Hastie, Kincaid and Donald was founded in 1868 by John Hastie, John Kincaid and Robert Donald. It was dissolved in 1871 when Hastie left, and reformed as Kincaid, Donald & Co. Robert Donald left in 1881, and the remaining founder, John Kincaid renamed it Kincaid & Co.

The company became limited liability in 1888 and was reconstructed as a partnership, John G. Kincaid & Co, between John Kincaid and his brother Charles Kincaid in 1895. The company once again became limited liability in 1906. It became a public company in 1937.

The company's fortunes declined with those of British shipbuilding generally following the Second World War and in 1977 it was subsumed into the Government owned British Shipbuilders in September 1977 under the Aircraft and Shipbuilding Industries Act 1977. In 1978 the company merged with Clark-Hawthorn of Tyneside to form Clark Kincaid, and sold for a nominal amount, 3 pounds, by British Shipbuilders in a management buyout to HLD Holdings who subsequently sold it to Kvaerner Industrier of Norway in 1990, becoming Kvaerner Kincaid. Kvaerner Kincaid became a diesel engine components manufacturer and was subsequently sold to Sweden's Scandiaverken AB in 1999 for several hundred thousand pounds to cease manufacturing and become a marine engine components distribution centre.
