= Sammy Gilmore =

- Born: 8 October 1939; Calton, Glasgow
- Died: 8 October 2011 (aged 72)
- Occupation: Electrician
- Known for: Trade Union leader at Upper Clyde Shipbuilders

Sammy Gilmore (8 October 1939 – 8 October 2011) was a shipyard electrician and trade union organiser, known for being one of the leaders of the Upper Clyde Shipbuilders' work-in in 1972.

== Life ==
Sammy was born to Maurice & Mary Gilmore. He had four sisters: Joyce, Anna, Margaret & Jenny. He was brought up in the Calton area of Glasgow and attended St Mungo's Academy. After leaving school he became an apprentice electrician and worked in various building sites around Scotland. It was during this time that he became interested in trade unionism as the working conditions of employees appalled him. This resulted in him being dismissed from many sites as he would regularly clash with senior management when he was requested to act on behalf of fellow employees who had legitimate gripes. His growing reputation made it difficult to obtain employment in building sites; he believed he was being blacklisted, but was able to take up employment in the late 1950s as an electrician in the shipyards. His union activities continued. By the time of the Upper Clyde Shipbuilders crisis at the beginning of the 1970s, Gilmore had become one of the most respected shop stewards in Clyde shipbuilding, eventually becoming convenor of the yard.

Gilmore joined Jimmy Reid, Sammy Barr, and Jimmy Airlie in planning and organising the campaign of industrial action which followed in 1971. Gilmore was a member of the Labour Party and a supporter of Tony Benn. The other three union leaders were members of the Communist Party at the time.

As a union leader, Gilmore was known for his skill in public speaking, good humour, and straight-talking manner - reportedly telling then-Prime Minister Ted Heath to "cut the commercials". He also once told then-industry secretary Sir Keith Joseph to shut up if he had nothing constructive to contribute.

A rebuke from a London journalist whose call went unanswered after hours was met with the sharp response; "Did no one tell you? Govan Shipbuilders go jogging on a Friday night."

Gilmore was seen as instrumental in maintaining the public support and the morale of the workers during the Upper Clyde Shipbuilders action. He was articulate and reasoned in his dealings with both fellow workers and the media, encouraging Harold Wilson and Tony Benn to visit the shipyard.

== Marriage ==
He married Margaret McElhinney in 1964. The couple had a daughter, Helen (Lyn), a son, Maurice, and five grandchildren.

== Later years and death ==
Sammy retired from the shipyards in 1989. He continued to follow political events and would voice his opinion with his trade mark acidic quips. He was also an avid reader and believed passionately in self improvement through education. He enjoyed watching football and was a huge Celtic fan. He was a fan of Scottish comedian Chic Murray and would entertain family and friends by impersonating him at family events.

He died after a long illness on 8 October 2011, his 72nd birthday.
