= Alienation =

Alienation may refer to:

- Social alienation, an individual's estrangement from society
- Alienation (property law), the legal transfer of title of ownership to another party
- Marx's theory of alienation, the separation of things that naturally belong together, or antagonism between those who are properly in harmony
- Alienation effect, an audience's inability to identify with a character in a performance, as an intended consequence of the actor's interpretation of the script
- Alienation of affections, a legal term whereby a third party is blamed for the breakdown of a personal relationship
- Parental alienation, a process through which a child becomes estranged from a parent as the result of the psychological manipulation of another parent
- Parental alienation syndrome, the theory that a set of behaviors in a child who displays extreme but unwarranted fear, disrespect or hostility towards a parent can be used to establish that the child's reaction was caused by the other parent
- "Alienation" (speech), an inaugural address by Jimmy Reid as Rector of the University of Glasgow
- Alienation (video game), a 2016 PlayStation 4 video game
- Alienation (album), a 2025 album by Three Days Grace
- "Alienation" (Mork & Mindy), a 1981 television episode
- "Alienation" (Perception), a 2013 television episode

== See also ==
- Alienated (disambiguation)
- Alienability (disambiguation)
- Alien Nation (disambiguation)
