= Alienability =

Alienability may refer to or be associated with:

- Alienability (grammar)
- Alienability of rights

== See also ==
- Alienation (disambiguation)
- Alienated (disambiguation)
