= Gregor Gall =

British academic and writer (born 1967)

Gregor Gall (born 1967) is a British academic and writer, who has taught at several British universities.

== Career ==
He was professor of industrial relations at the University of Bradford and before then professors of industrial relations at the University of Stirling and the University of Hertfordshire. He is now an affiliate research associate in the School of Social and Political Sciences at the University of Glasgow, a visiting professor at the University of Leeds and an honorary professor at the University of Waikato, New Zealand. He researches and writes primarily about trade unions, and has a particular interest in the labour movement politics of Scotland – for example, he is working on a research project examining union leadership and the disproportionate contribution of Scots to the British-wide union movement at senior levels (like general secretaries).

He is author and editor of numerous academic books, and is also a politically engaged academic, whereby he has regularly contributed to the Morning Star, The Guardian's Comment is free website, the Frontline magazine, The Conversation, The Scotsman, The Herald, The Huffington Post, The National and a number of other media outlets, such as the journal of the ASLEF train drivers' Locomotive union and Tribune. He also provides research and consultancy to a number of unions, particularly the Fire Brigades Union, and is a frequent commentator in the media on matters of unions and industrial conflict. He was also a correspondent for Planetlabor from 2009 to 2016.

== Political views ==
Originally a member of Labour Students and the Labour Party from 1985, he ended his membership of these in 1988 over the issue of the poll tax, then joining the Socialist Workers' Party (SWP) in 1990. He joined the Scottish Socialist Party (SSP) in advance of the SWP joining en masse, leaving the SWP in 2004 after many years of growing disagreements. He was a member of the editorial board of the Scottish Left Review from 2003, was editor of its book arm, the Scottish Left Review Press, and has been the editor of the journal of the Scottish Labour History Society, called Scottish Labour History since 2008 (then since 2015 as joint editor with Jim Philips of the University of Glasgow). Following the resignation of Robin McAlpine as Director of the Jimmy Reid Foundation and Editor of the Scottish Left Review to concentrate on the Commonweal, Gall stepped in as Director and Editor. Gall was a member of the board of management of the Jimmy Reid Foundation since its inception. Gall resigned as Director and Editor in December 2022. He has written a lengthy and detailed biography of Tommy Sheridan (Welsh Academic Press, 2012).

== Scottish independence campaign ==
In late 2013, he published his contribution to the case for Scottish independence entitled Scotland the brave? Independence and radical social change. The key arguments concerned not relying on the SNP and establishing a connection between the material grievances of ordinary citizens and the possibilities of higher standards of living and better life chances under independence as a result of rolling back the tentacles of neo-liberalism.

== Biography of Bob Crow ==
Following the sudden and unexpected death of RMT general secretary Bob Crow in March 2014, Gall has written a political biography of him, examining what lessons can be learnt for the union movement from his style of leadership in espousing militant, oppositional politics. The biography was published by Manchester University Press in March 2017 on the third anniversary of his death.

== The Punk Rock Politics of Joe Strummer ==
An extended analysis of the politics of Joe Strummer and their impact was published by Gall in June 2022 to mark the twentieth anniversary of the death of Strummer, one of the most influential radical musicians of the twentieth century. The study draws on original testimony to explore how Strummer inspired many to adopt left-wing politics and others to sustain them in their left-wing politics.

== Mick Lynch: The making of a working-class hero ==
Manchester University Press published Professor Gregor Gall's Mick Lynch: The making of a working-class hero in early 2024. The book is a combined biographical and sociological study of Mick Lynch, a leading figure in the RMT union, as he became a leading left-wing public figure from the early summer of 2022 onwards.

== Publications ==
As author

- The Meaning of Militancy? Postal workers and industrial relations, 2003, Ashgate, ISBN 0-7546-1902-8, pp350 (and 2019 via Routledge Revivals series).
- The Political Economy of Scotland: Red Scotland? Radical Scotland?, 2005, University of Wales Press, ISBN 0-7083-1944-0, pp260.
- Sex Worker Union Organizing: An International Study, 2006, Palgrave, ISBN 1-4039-4925-5, pp252.
- Labour Unionism in the Financial Services Sector: struggling for rights and representation, Ashgate, 2008, pp212, (and 2022 via Routledge Revivals series).
- Tommy Sheridan: From Hero to Zero? A Political Biography, Welsh Academic Press, 2012, pp360, ISBN 978-1-86057-119-0.
- An Agency of Their Own: sex worker union organising, Zero, 2012, pp97, ISBN 1846942543.
- Scotland the brave? Independence and radical social change, Scottish Left Review Press, 2013, pp60, ISBN 9780955036262.
- Sex worker unionisation: global developments, challenges and possibilities, Palgrave, 2016, pp240, ISBN 9781137320131.
- Bob Crow – fighter, leader, socialist, Manchester University Press, 2017, ISBN 9781526100290.
- Employment Relations in Financial Services: an exploration of the employee experience after the financial crash, Palgrave 2017, pp260 ISBN 9781137395399.
- The Punk Rock Politics of Joe Strummer: resistance, rebellion and radicalism, Manchester University Press, 2022, pp304 ISBN 978-1-5261-4898-8 with Spanish language edition published by Liburuak, 2023 ISBN 978-84-19234-08-7 and German language edition published by Verlag AG, 2024.
- Mick Lynch: The making of a working-class hero, Manchester University Press, 2024, ISBN 978-1-5261-7309-6.
- Creating a communist contra-culture: The Redskins, rock’n’roll and revolution, 2026, Bloomsbury Academic, London.
- Sex workers uniting and fighting: the triumphs, trials and tribulations of their unionisation, 2027, PM Press, Binghampton, NY.
- Scarlet Scotland – the paradox of radicalism, Welsh Academic Press, 2028.

As editor

- Union Organising: campaigning for trade union recognition. Edited collection, 2003, Routledge, ISBN 0-415-26781-1, pp272.
- Union Recognition: Organising and Bargaining Outcomes. Edited collection, 2006, Routledge, ISBN 0-415-34336-4, pp260.
- Is there a Scottish Road to Socialism? 2007, Scottish Left Review Press, Glasgow, ISBN 978-0-9550362-2-4, pp137.
- Union Revitalisation in Advanced Economies: assessing the contribution of ‘union organising’, Palgrave, 2009, ISBN 978-0-230-20439-3, pp240.
- The Future of Union Organising – building for tomorrow, Palgrave, 2009, ISBN 978-0-230-22242-7, pp256.
- New Forms and Expressions of Conflict at Work, Palgrave, 2013, ISBN 9780230300071, pp272.
- Time to choose: is there a Scottish road to socialism? 2013, Scottish Left Review Press, Glasgow, second edition, pp196, ISBN 0955036259.
- Is there a Scottish road to socialism? 2016, Scottish Left Review Press, Glasgow, third edition, ISBN 9780955036293.
- The International Handbook of Labour, Work and Employment, Edward Elgar, Cheltenham, 2019, pp464, ISBN 9781784715687.
- A New Scotland: Building an Equal, Fair and Sustainable Society, Pluto Press, London, 2022, pp352 ISBN 9780745345062.
- The Handbook of the Past, Present and Future of Labour Unions, Agenda Publishers, Newcastle, hardback 2024, ISBN 9781788215510, softback 2025.

As co-editor

- The International Handbook of Labour Unions: Responses to Neo-liberalism, Edward Elgar, Cheltenham, 2011, ISBN 978 0 85793 882 4.
- Global anti-unionism – nature, dynamics, trajectories and outcomes, Palgrave, 2013, ISBN 9780230303348.
