= Upper Clyde Shipbuilders =

Defunct Scottish shipbuilding consortium

Upper Clyde Shipbuilders Limited
- Type: Private
- Industry: Shipbuilding
- Founded: 1968; 58 years ago
- Defunct: 1972; 54 years ago
- Fate: Liquidated
- Successor: Govan Shipbuilders; Scotstoun Marine; Yarrow Shipbuilders; Marathon (Clydebank)
- Headquarters: Fitzpatrick House, Cadogan Street, Glasgow, Scotland; Alexander Stephen House, Linthouse, Glasgow (from 1969)
- Key people: Sir Anthony Hepper (Chairman); Kenneth Douglas C.B.E.(Managing Director); Sir Robert Smith (Liquidator)
- Number of employees: 13,000
- Subsidiaries: Clydebank Division; Govan Division; Linthouse Division; Scotstoun Division; Simons & Lobnitz; Yarrow Shipbuilders (until April 1970)

Upper Clyde Shipbuilders (UCS) was a Scottish shipbuilding consortium, created in 1968 as a result of the amalgamation of five major shipbuilders of the River Clyde. It entered liquidation, with much controversy, in 1971. That led to a "work-in" campaign at the company's shipyards, involving shop stewards Jimmy Airlie and Jimmy Reid, among others.

== Formation ==
The Company was formed in February 1968 from the amalgamation of five Upper Clyde Shipbuilding firms: Fairfield in Govan (Govan Division), Alexander Stephen and Sons in Linthouse (Linthouse Division), Charles Connell and Company in Scotstoun (Scotstoun Division) and John Brown & Company at Clydebank (Clydebank Division), as well as an associate subsidiary, Yarrow Shipbuilders, in which UCS held a controlling stake of 51%.

The consolidation was a result of the Geddes Report, published in 1966, and the subsequent Shipbuilding Industry Act 1967 (sponsored by the Minister of Technology, then Anthony Wedgwood Benn) which recommended rationalisation and horizontal integration of shipbuilding in the United Kingdom into large regional groups, aided with grants from the state Shipbuilding Industry Board, in order to achieve economies of scale and better compete in the market for increasingly large merchant vessels like VLCCs. The creation of these groupings included Scott Lithgow on the Lower Clyde, Swan Hunter on Tyneside and Robb Caledon on the east coast of Scotland. The government had a 48.4% minority holding in the consortium and provided a £5.5m interest-free government loan over the first three years. UCS had a combined order book at the time worth £87m.

== Collapse of UCS ==
In June 1971, the loss-making Upper Clyde Shipbuilders went into receivership (only one yard of the five, Yarrow Shipbuilders, remained profitable but had left the joint venture in April 1970). In February 1971, in the wake of the emergency nationalisation of Rolls-Royce Limited, the then Conservative government under Edward Heath and the Secretary of State for Trade and Industry, John Davies, announced a policy that refused further state-support for "lame duck" industries, which led to a crisis of confidence amongst UCS creditors and resulted in severe cash flow problems for the company. After the government refused UCS a £6m working capital loan as a lender of last resort, the company was forced to enter liquidation although the yards had a full order book and a forecasted profit in 1972.

== Work-in ==
After the company's collapse, rather than striking, unions representing the shipyard's workers decided to conduct a "work-in" to complete orders already in place. The work-in was led by a group of young shop stewards, including Jimmy Reid, Jimmy Airlie, Sammy Barr and Sammy Gilmore. Reid wanted to ensure the workers projected the best image of the yard workers he possibly could, and he insisted on tight discipline. He addressed the workers at the yards, where he instructed them that there should be "no hooliganism, no vandalism and no bevvying [drinking]".

=== Work-in support ===
The shipbuilders' tactics worked, and public sympathy in the Glasgow area and beyond was on the side of the workers who took part. That was backed up with demonstrations in Glasgow, one of which was attended by around 80,000 marchers. At one demonstration, on Glasgow Green, Tony Benn addressed those in attendance, and Matt McGinn and Billy Connolly (both former shipyard workers) offered entertainment to the gathered crowd. The campaign was also well-backed financially, and at one meeting for the campaign, Jimmy Reid was able to announce that the campaign had received a £5,000 contribution from John Lennon, to which an attendee replied "but Lenin's deid!" (dead).

=== Analysis of the work-in ===
The Thatcher Conservative government would be more far-reaching in its attempts to remove state involvement in industrial affairs.

== Restructuring and aftermath ==
In February 1972, the Conservative government relented to the demands of the workers and restructured the yards around two new companies: Govan Shipbuilders was established (formerly Fairfields), along with its subsidiary Scotstoun Marine (formerly Connells). Yarrow Shipbuilders had already withdrawn from UCS in April 1970 and regained its status as an independent company (until 1977, when it was nationalised as part of British Shipbuilders, along with Govan Shipbuilders). A fourth yard, at Clydebank (formerly John Brown), was sold to the Marathon Manufacturing Company of Texas, (commonly confused with Marathon Oil) as an oil-rig fabrication yard; which eventually closed in 2001.

In 1999, two major shipyards on the Upper Clyde (the former Yarrow and Fairfields yards) were acquired by the defence contractor BAE Systems and became part of BAE Systems Surface Ships.
