= Alienated =

Alienated may refer to:

- Alienated (TV series), a 2003 Canadian science fiction TV series
- "Alienated" (Diagnosis Murder episode), an episode of the sixth season of Diagnosis Murder
- "Alienated" (Eureka episode), an episode of the first season of Eureka
- "Alienated", a song by Keri Hilson on her album In a Perfect World...
- Alienated, the first book in the Alienated trilogy by Melissa Landers

== See also ==
- Alienation (disambiguation)
