= Sheila (clipper ship) =

Sheila was a clipper ship built in 1877 by Charles Connell and Company, Glasgow.

The ship is known for a 1877 voyage which brought 600 indentured laborers from Calcutta to the Caribbean.

The ship was wrecked at Bocca Falsa on Lussino Island, now known as Losinj, Croatia, in 1910.
