= Windhover (clipper ship) =

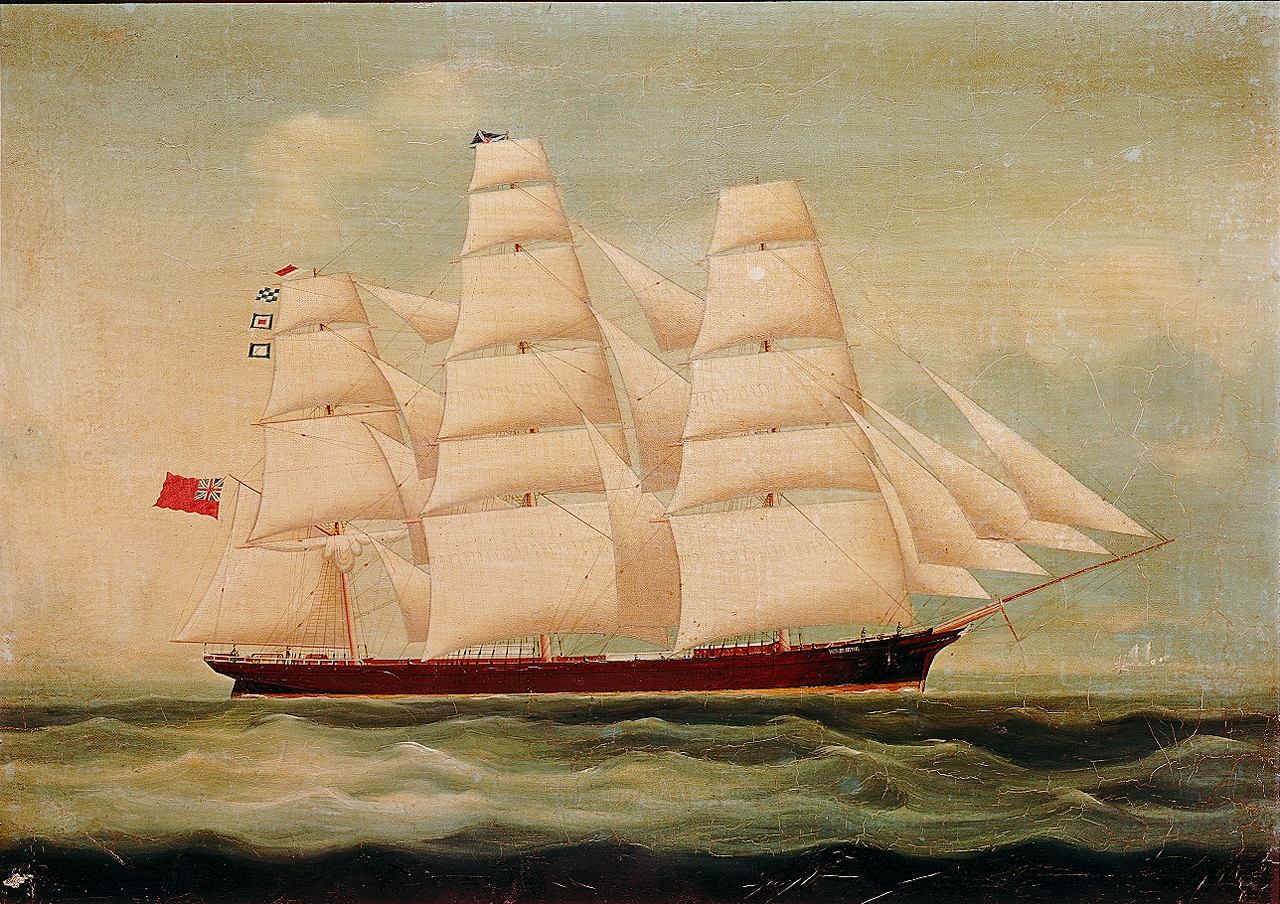
- The ship Windhover

History

United Kingdom
- Name: Windhover
- Owner: Findlay & Co
- Builder: Charles Connell and Company, Glasgow, Scotland
- Launched: January 1868
- Completed: 1868
- Maiden voyage: Glasgow to Liverpool, 1868
- Home port: Glasgow, Scotland
- Fate: Wrecked; Australia, 1889

General characteristics
- Type: Clipper Ship
- Tonnage: 847 NRT
- Length: 201.1ft
- Beam: 34.0ft
- Depth: 19.8 ft
- Sail plan: fully rigged ship; barque from about 1880

Windhover was a British tea clipper built in the closing years of construction of this sort of ship. She measured 847 tons NRT. Like the majority of the tea clippers built in the second half of the 1860s, she was of composite construction. She was built by Charles Connell and Company, Glasgow, Scotland in 1868.

== History ==
The Windhover's maiden voyage was from Glasgow, Scotland to Liverpool, Britain in 1868.

In 1870, the Windhover carried 1,064,645 lbs of tea from Foo Chow, China to London in 99 days, the best achieved that year before the monsoon changed direction (but bettered only by Lahloo and Leander with 98 days). The races of tea clippers from China had changed since The Great Tea Race of 1866 - a monetary prize ("the premium") was no longer included in the bill of lading of a tea clipper and the winner was judged to be the ship with the fastest passage, rather than the first to dock in London.

After the opening of the Suez Canal in 1870, clipper ships were replaced with faster steamships in the transport of tea and other cargo. Most were used in the Australian wool trade. The Windhover travelled regularly to China, sailing to Shanghai, Foo-Chow, Yokohama and Hong Kong. She was bought by Kerr & Co in 1881 and altered to a barque rig while working the Australian trade routes, hauling coal from western Australia to the eastern cities.

August 1889, the Windhover wrecked off the coast of Australia on the Bramble Cay Reef. She was carrying 1300 tons of coal bound for Batavia, Indonesia.
