= Mersey (1894 ship) =

1894 sailing ship

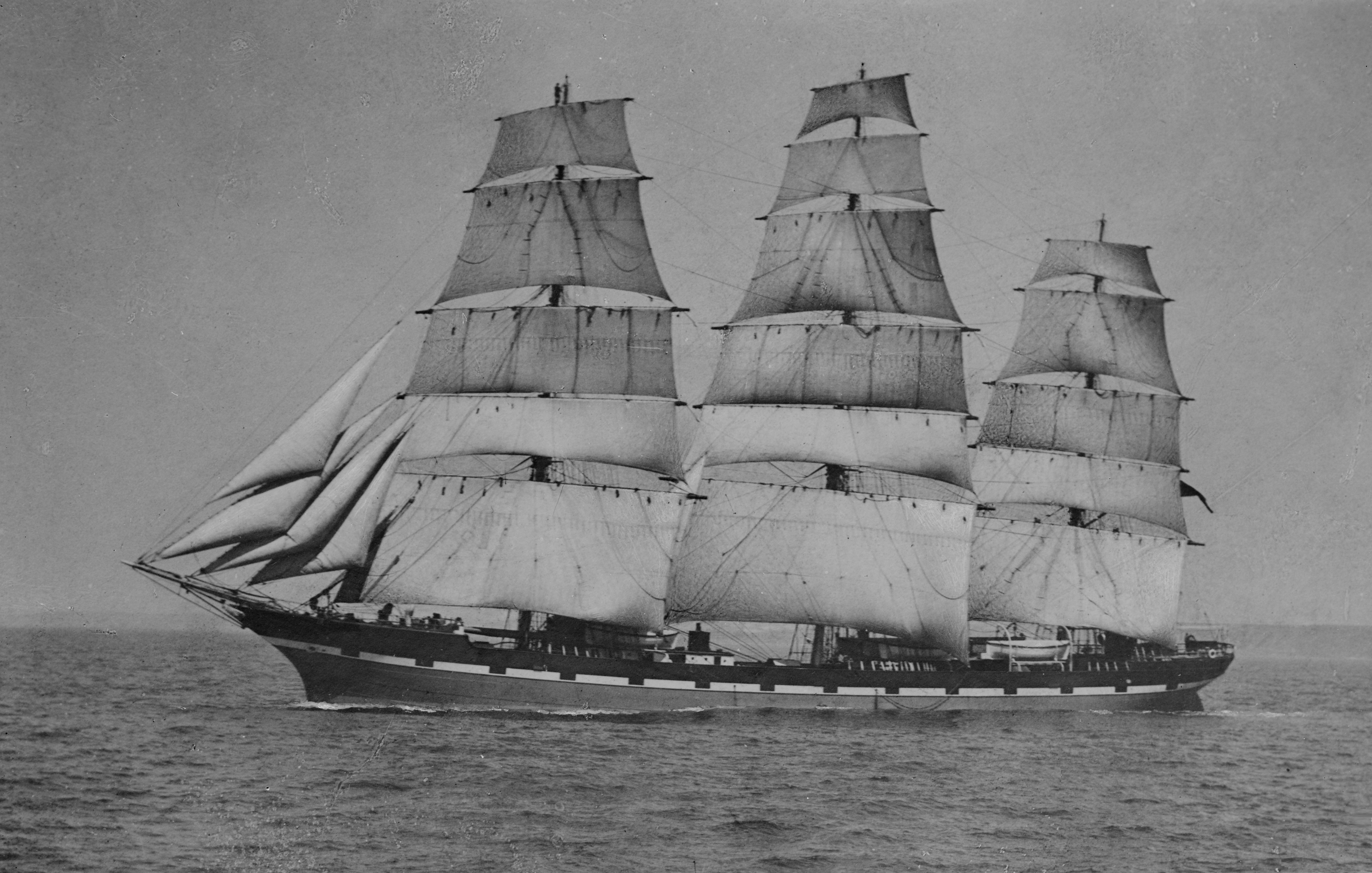
- The Mersey in full sail

History
- Name: 1894: Mersey; 1915: Transatlantic; 1917: Dvergso
- Namesake: 1894: River Mersey
- Owner: Nourse Line (1894–1908); White Star Line (1908–1915); Akt. Transatlantic Motor Ship Company (1915–1916); C. Nilsen (1916–1917); Christiansands Shipping Co. (1917–1922); A/S Otra - L.Jorgensen (1922); A/S Svelviks Skipsbred (1922)
- Port of registry: London
- Builder: Charles Connell & Company, Glasgow
- Launched: 24 May 1894
- In service: 1895
- Out of service: 1922
- Fate: Broken up in 1923 by Gracechurch Transports Ltd.

General characteristics
- Type: Iron hull sailing ship
- Displacement: 1,829 tons
- Length: 270.7 feet (82.5 m)
- Beam: 39 feet (12 m)
- Draft: 21 ft (6.4 m)
- Depth of hold: 22.5 feet (6.9 m)
- Propulsion: sails
- Notes: Employed as a cadet training ship by White Star with berths for 60 cadets from 1911 to 1915; made 6 sailings to Australia.; Fitted with wireless; believed to be first sailing ship to be so equipped.

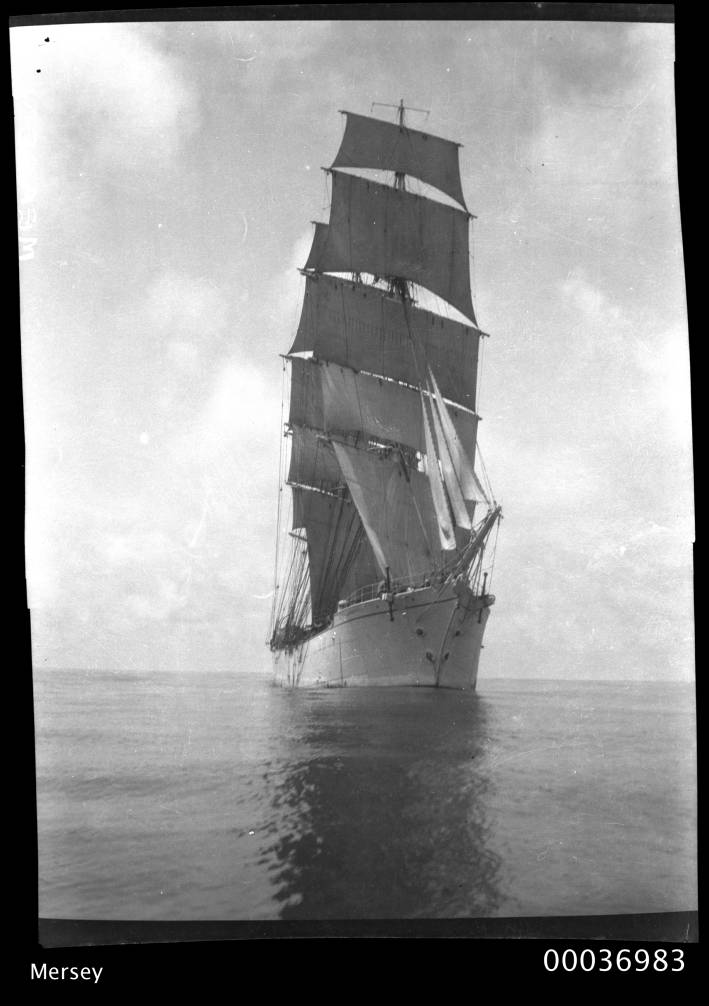
Mersey, 1908, near Sydney

The Mersey was a 1,829 ton iron-hulled sailing ship with a length of 270.7 feet (82.5 m), beam of 39 feet (12 m) and depth of 22.5 feet (6.9 m). She was built by Charles Connell and Company of Glasgow, named after the River Mersey in north-western England and launched on 18 May 1894.

The ship was originally made for the Nourse Line which used her primarily to transport of Indian indentured labourers to the British colonies, a so-called "coolie ship". Details of some of these voyages are as follows:

| Destination | Date of arrival | Number of passengers | Deaths during voyage |
|---|---|---|---|
| Suriname | 10 April 1896 | 661 | n/a |
| Trinidad | 20 October 1897 | 668 | 11 |
| Suriname | 28 January 1902 | 678 | n/a |
| Fiji | 13 June 1903 | 585 | n/a |
| Trinidad | 8 February 1906 | 665 | 5 |

In 1908 the Mersey was sold to the White Star Line for use as a training ship for 60 cadets, making six voyages to Australia as a White Star training ship, traveling around the Cape of Good Hope outbound and Cape Horn inbound. In 1910 she became the first sailing ship to be equipped with a radio. She was also the first sailing ship aboard which an operation for appendicitis was performed on a cadet.

In 1915 the White Star Line gave up their training scheme due to the war and sold the Mersey to Norwegian owners. She changed hands a number of times and her name was changed to Transatlantic then to Dvergso. She was scrapped in 1923.

== See also ==
- Indian Indenture Ships to Fiji
- Indian indenture system

== Sources ==
- Lubbock, Basil (1981). Coolie ships and oil sailors. Brown, Son & Ferguson. ISBN 0-85174-111-8.
- Perry, F.W. (1991). Nourse Line. Kendal: World Ship Society. ISBN 0-905617-62-2.
- Olaf Engvig's book Legends in Sail (Chapter on Mersey) ISBN 978-0-578-11756-0: https://www.engvig.com/olaf/legendsinsail/index.shtml
