= Scottish Left Review =

The Scottish Left Review is a bi-monthly magazine publication of the Scottish left. It was established in 2000 by several prominent left-wing figures, including Bob Thomson, Henry McCubbin, Jimmy Reid, Roseanna Cunningham, and John McAllion. Contributions come from members of all parties of the Scottish left and none. In 2006, it established the Scottish Left Review Press - which has published the best selling 'Is there a Scottish road to socialism?' edited collection - and in 2010 it also established the Jimmy Reid Foundation.

The magazine was edited by Robin McAlpine from the early 2000s until mid-2014, and by Gregor Gall until 2022. It is now edited by Cailean Gallagher.

The magazine survives through a combination of pay for subscriptions for the hard copy of the magazine, advertising from unions and progressive organisation and donations from readers and supporters.

Visits to the magazine's website run into the hundreds of thousands. For example, in July 2025, the website had 500,796 hits and 95,530 unique visitors. Readership has more than trebled in the last 3 years.
