= Charles Connell and Company =

Scottish shipbuilding company

- Type: Private
- Industry: Shipbuilding
- Founded: 1861
- Defunct: 1980
- Fate: Closed
- Successor: Scotstoun Marine (1972–1980)
- Headquarters: Scotstoun, Glasgow, Scotland
- Parent: Upper Clyde Shipbuilders (1968–1971); Govan Shipbuilders (1972–1980)

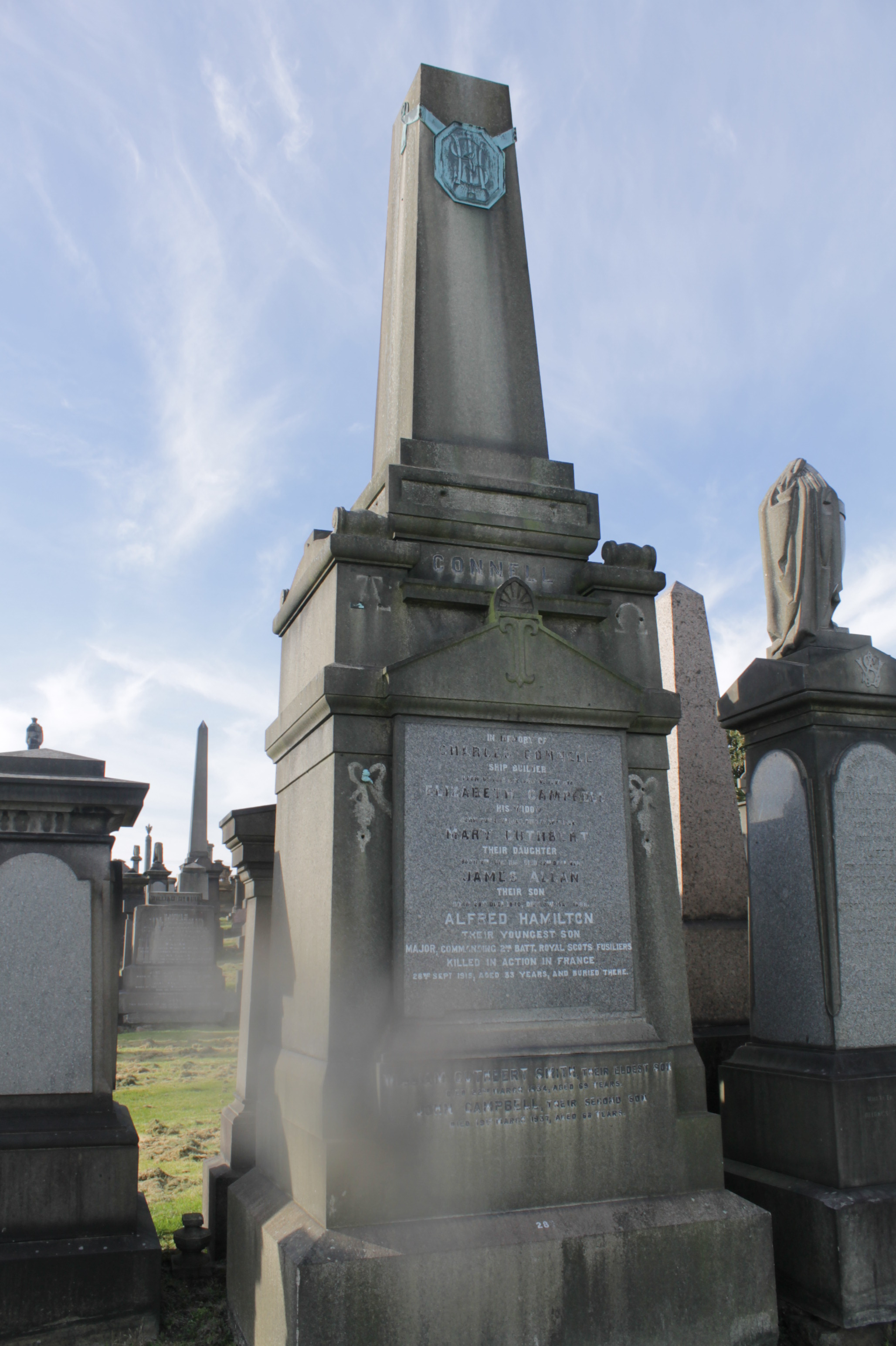
The grave of Charles Connell, Glasgow Necropolis

Charles Connell and Company was a Scottish shipbuilding company based in Scotstoun in Glasgow on the River Clyde.

== History ==
The company was founded by Charles Connell (1822–1894), who had served an apprenticeship with Robert Steele & Company before becoming manager of Alexander Stephen & Sons' Kelvinhaugh yard. He started shipbuilding on his own account at Scotstoun in 1861, initially concentrating on sailing ships.

From 1918 the Company became well known for high quality passenger and cargo ships. The yard closed from 1930 to 1937 due to the Great Depression, before rearmament efforts stimulated demand.

In 1968 the yard passed from Connell family ownership after 107 years and became part of Upper Clyde Shipbuilders. The Scotstoun yard continued to be operated by Upper Clyde Shipbuilders until 1971, when the company collapsed. From 1972 to 1980 it was operated by Scotstoun Marine, a subsidiary of the nationalised Govan Shipbuilders, which had emerged from the restructuring of Upper Clyde Shipbuilders, and was modernised by civil engineering contractor George Leslie Ltd between 1973 and 1978. The yard constructed 15 ships between 1972 and 1980 when the yard closed after 119 years of shipbuilding in which 535 ships had been built.

The site's modern Clarke Chapman berth luffing cranes were moved upstream to Govan shipyard, although the two concrete building berths remained in situ. Part of the yard's modernised covered facilities were utilised by steel stockholders GKN whilst the riverside berth was utilised by Motherwell Bridge Engineering for heavy fabrication work. In 2005, the former shipyard site was acquired by Malcolm Group as a depot and fabrication yard for its construction division.

== Ships built ==
Connells built over 510 ships at Scotstoun. They include:

- Wild Deer (1863) – composite clipper ship
- Michael Angelo (clipper) (1865) – sailing clipper
- Taitsing (1865) — sailing clipper
- Spindrift (1867) – composite clipper ship
- Windhover (1868) – clipper
- Loch Ard (1873) — sailing ship
- Sheila (1877) — iron-hulled clipper
- SS City of Agra (1879) – cargo steamer
- Balclutha (1886) — iron-hulled sailing ship, preserved at the San Francisco Maritime Museum
- Mersey (1894) — iron-hulled sailing ship
- Knight Errant (1897) – cargo ship
- Saturnia (1910) – passenger steamship
- Acacia-class sloops HMS Jonquil (1915) and HMS Laburnum (1915)
- Arabis-class sloops HMS Gladiolus (1915), HMS Godetia (1916) and HMS Hydrangea (1916)
- P-class sloops HMS P.14 (1916) and HMS P.63 (1916)
- SS Clan Skene (1919)
- SS Diplomat (1921)
- SS Traveller (1922)
- SS Auditor (1924)
- SS Benvenue (1927)
- SS Benmohr (1928)
- SS Benwyvis (1929)
- SS Traprain Law (1930)
- SS Rothermere (1938)
- SS Narwik (1942) — Polish Empire B class cargo steamship
- Empire Celia (1943) — MoWT cargo steamship
- Purnea (1947) – passenger-cargo ship
