= Sammy Barr =

Scottish trade unionist (1931–2012)

- Born: Samuel Alexander Barr; 20 December 1931; Glasgow, Scotland
- Died: 7 May 2012 (aged 80); Glasgow, Scotland
- Occupation: Ship's welder
- Known for: Trade unionist, UCS work-in veteran

Samuel Alexander Barr (20 December 1931 – 7 May 2012) was a British shipyard worker, trade unionist and Upper Clyde Shipbuilders (UCS) work-in veteran. Barr was an "inspiring speaker" and organiser who was a "widely respected shop steward" of the Boilermakers' Society at the time of the "historic work-in" at the UCS in 1971. Barr was credited with coming up with the idea for a work-in, which gained a lot of publicity and forced the UK Government into a reversal, saving 6,000 jobs at the shipyard. Barr was a lifelong friend to fellow UCS activists Jimmy Airlie and Sammy Gilmore. Throughout his life he displayed "considerable political commitment" to the right to work, and protection for the rights of young working people, and also particularly to the protection of the Clyde shipyards.

Richard Leonard writes that "he was unquestionably one of the outstanding trade unionists of his generation, which was a generation of outstanding trade unionists".

== Life ==
Barr was born in Glasgow in 1931. At the age of 15, Barr joined Charles Connell and Company in Scotstoun as an apprentice welder. He remained in the shipbuilding industry for his entire working life. Barr married Janet, had five children, and at the time of his death was a grandfather and great-grandfather.

As well as his involvement in politics and the trade unions, Barr is known to have written variously during his lifetime for journals such as Labour Monthly, the Daily Worker and the Morning Star.

Barr died of lung cancer in 2012, at the age of 80, after a short illness.

== 1971 work-in at UCS ==
The crisis came about in the UK in 1971 when the new Conservative Government decided to stop subsidies provided to the shipbuilding industry., which they described as a "lame duck". This risked the redundancies of 6,000 of the 8,500 shipyard workers at UCS.

After the Government refused to help the UCS shipyard, an organising committee of worker representatives was formed. This committee came up with the idea of a work-in, rather than a strike. This led to mass rallies, and gained support for the workers from across the world.

In the short term, the UK Government, led by Ted Heath, backed down and were forced into an embarrassing u-turn on the immediate future of the shipyard. Immediately the UK Government announced a package of £35 million investment into the future of the yards, and within three years, shipbuilding on the Upper Clyde had received about £101 million of public grants.

Although there are different views as to the long-term success of the work-in, it is likely that the shipbuilding still existing in the Clyde as of 2012 owes much for its existence to Barr and his fellow organisers.

== Trade unionism ==
From almost the start of his working career at the age of 15, Barr developed a strong interest in representing his fellow workers. Firstly he became a shop steward for his fellow apprentices, then later for his fellow welders in the Boilermakers' Society which was the largest of the unions in the shipyards. By the time of the crisis at UCS, Barr was already a leading union figure.

In 1977 he was narrowly beaten in the election for the office of assistant general secretary of the Boilermakers' Society. He became vice-chairman of the Glasgow Trades Council after acting as a delegate there in the 1980s. The Boilermakers' Society was later amalgamated with the GMB union.

Barr's commitment to the representation of workers continued throughout his life and he was president of the retired member's association for the GMB Union, and a branch secretary in Glasgow right up until his death. After his death, he was described by a spokesman for the GMB union as "one of the outstanding trade unionists of his generation. His passing marks the end of an era". "He leaves behind a legacy of great memories but also a reminder to workers the world over that if you stand firm you can win."

== Political career ==
From a young age, Barr showed a keen interest in politics - he was elected onto the Communist Party's Scottish Committee. During the 1960s, he stood as a Communist candidate for local council elections for Partick West. In the early 1970s, Barr stood as a parliamentary candidate for the Communist Party, in Glasgow Garscadden. He stood for election at the general elections in February 1974, 1979 and 1983, and also in the by-election of 1978.

Barr later became a Labour Party member, recognised as a firmly old-school Labourite. Tony Benn became a lifelong friend and presented Barr with a medal to recognise his contribution at the 40th anniversary of the work-in in 2011.

Barr also played an active part in local campaigns, such as successfully campaigning to prevent the closure of a park in the area of Partick where he lived.

== See also ==
- Upper Clyde Shipbuilders
- Jimmy Reid
