= Jimmy Reid =

Scottish trade union activist, orator, politician and journalist

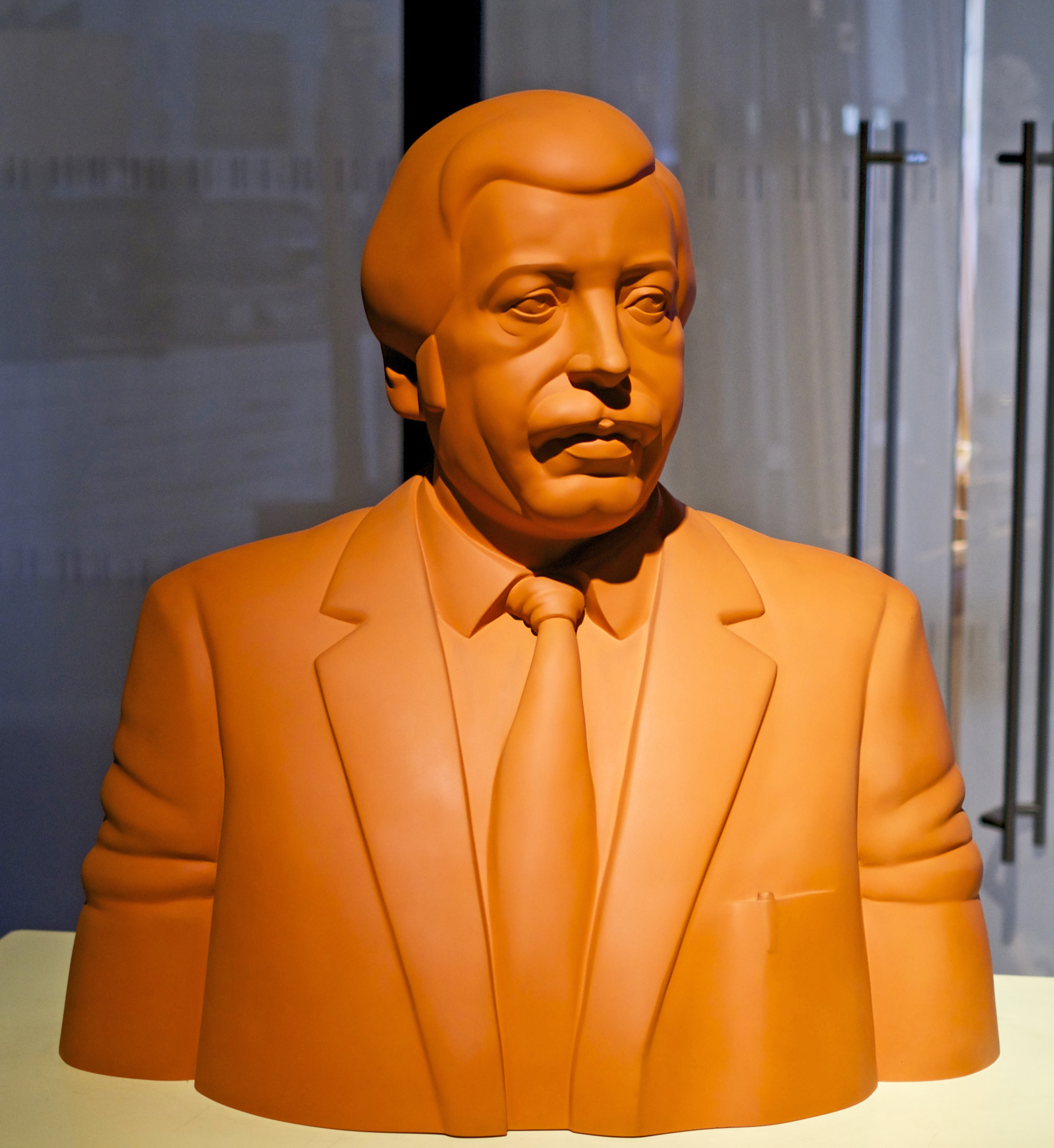
A sculpture depicting Jimmy Reid later in his life

James Reid (9 July 1932 – 10 August 2010) was a Scottish trade union activist, orator, politician and journalist born in Govan, Glasgow. His role as spokesman and one of the leaders in the Upper Clyde Shipbuilders work-in between June 1971 and October 1972 attracted international recognition. He later served as Rector of the University of Glasgow and subsequently became a journalist and broadcaster. Formerly a member of the Communist Party of Great Britain, Reid was later a member of the Labour Party. He moved on to supporting the Scottish Socialist Party in the late 1990s, then joined the Scottish National Party in 2005 and gave his full support to the idea of Scottish independence. He died in 2010 after a long illness.

== Early life ==
Reid was born in Govan, Glasgow, then a major British shipbuilding centre. In his youth, Reid joined the Young Communist League and later he became a member of the Communist Party of Great Britain. He was involved in organising a major apprentices' strike at the River Clyde shipyards in 1951.

== Union career ==
Reid came to prominence in the early 1970s, when he led the Upper Clyde Shipbuilders work-in to try to stop Edward Heath's Conservative government from closing down the shipyards on the River Clyde. The government had decided that the shipyards should operate without state subsidy, which would have resulted in at least six thousand job losses. An engineer by trade and shop steward of the Amalgamated Union of Engineering Workers, Reid, along with his colleagues Jimmy Airlie, Sammy Gilmore and Sammy Barr, decided that the best way to show the viability of keeping the yards open was by staging a work-in rather than by going on strike. This meant that the workers would continue to complete what orders the shipyard had until the government changed policy.

In a speech to the workers Reid announced the beginning of workers' control of the shipyard and insisted on self-discipline while it was in force:

We are not going to strike. We are not even having a sit-in strike. Nobody and nothing will come in, and nothing will go out, without our permission. And there will be no hooliganism, there will be no vandalism, there will be no bevvying, because the world is watching us, and it is our responsibility to conduct ourselves with responsibility, and with dignity, and with maturity.

The occupation received support from across the world. There was a series of fundraising events, and foreign unions, celebrities such as John Lennon and Billy Connolly, and members of the public provided donations. The campaign was successful in persuading Heath to back down the following year, and the Clyde shipyards received £101million in public support over the following three years.

== Political career ==
=== CPGB years ===
Reid was elected as a Communist councillor in Clydebank, where, until the local government reform of the mid-1970s, there were a few Communist councillors. He stood for the Communist Party of Great Britain in East Dunbartonshire in the 1970 general election.

Reid also served as Rector of the University of Glasgow, having been elected to the post in 1971, largely on the back of his union activities. When he was installed as Rector he gave a speech that has become known as "the rat-race speech". The New York Times printed the speech in full and described it as "the greatest speech since President Lincoln's Gettysburg Address".

Reject the values and false morality that underlie these attitudes. A rat race is for rats. We're not rats. We're human beings. Reject the insidious pressures in society that would blunt your critical faculties to all that is happening around you, that would caution silence in the face of injustice lest you jeopardise your chances of promotion and self-advancement. This is how it starts and before you know where you are, you're a fully paid-up member of the rat-pack. The price is too high. It entails the loss of your dignity and human spirit. Or as Christ put it, "What doth it profit a man if he gain the whole world and suffer the loss of his soul?"

In the general election in February 1974 Reid stood for the Communist Party in Central Dunbartonshire, which was dominated by the town of Clydebank, against the sitting Labour member Hugh McCartney. Reid got 14.6 per cent of the votes cast, the best result for a Communist Party candidate in Britain for some time. It was a controversial campaign, as the ballot paper described Reid only as "Engineering Worker," which some thought was disguising his Communist identity. One Catholic priest gave a sermon advising his parishioners to vote only for candidates whose beliefs were consistent with Christian principles. In his speech at the count Reid described his opponents as "Falangists" in reference to their perceived Catholic nationalism. He stood again in October 1974, when his vote share went down to 8.7 per cent.

=== Leaving the CPGB for Labour and journalism ===
Reid left the Communist Party in around 1975. The breakaway Scottish Labour Party considered recruiting him, but its leader, Jim Sillars, reportedly said: "If we have that man in the party he'll be competing with me for time on the box."

About a year after he left the CP Reid joined the Labour Party. He was Labour candidate in Dundee East in 1979, but lost to Gordon Wilson, then the leader of the Scottish National Party (SNP). Writing in the aftermath of the election, Anthony Finlay stated in The Glasgow Herald that it was "only because the Labour Party was foolish enough to pick Jimmy Reid", that Wilson held the seat when all but one of the ten other SNP MPs was defeated. The decision by Dundee East Constituency Labour Party to select him as its candidate was controversial, as he had been a party member for less than the two years normally expected.

Reid then became a journalist and broadcaster, writing opinion columns for various newspapers including the Daily Mirror, The Herald, The Sun and The Scotsman. He also presented an investigative series 'The Reid Report', for BBC Scotland. In 1985 he wrote and presented a series of documentaries entitled Reid About the USSR, for which his previous status within the Communist Party gave him unprecedented access. The series resulted in two BAFTAs. In 2000 Reid helped to establish the Scottish Left Review, a bimonthly publication. He also wrote a column in Tribune under the title "As I Please", previously used by George Orwell in the same magazine.

Reid was highly critical of the UK miners' strike (1984–1985) and its leader Arthur Scargill. In his newspaper column Reid argued that the working miners could not properly be referred to as strikebreakers, as no national ballot had been held and no local ballot had passed a resolution to strike: "A scab is someone who participates in a vote in which the majority are for taking strike action and then refuses to honour the decision. If you are denied the right to vote, it is impossible to be a scab." Reid's attitude led to his coming under strong criticism from many former supporters in the Labour movement, and Mick McGahey described him as "Broken Reid".

=== Leaving Labour for the SNP ===
Reid continued to support Labour up until the general election in 1997, but he became disillusioned with New Labour and in 1998 he urged voters to support the Scottish Socialist Party (SSP) in the first election to the new Scottish Parliament. In the SNP leadership contest in 2004 Reid urged party members to support Alex Salmond for leader and Nicola Sturgeon for deputy leader, and he joined the party in the following year.

In 2007 From Govan to Gettysburg, a play by Brian McGeachan about Reid's life, starring John Cairney, toured Scotland as part of celebrations of Jimmy Reid's 75th birthday.

== Later life and death ==
Reid retired to Rothesay on the Isle of Bute. He died at Inverclyde Royal Hospital on 10 August 2010. He had been in poor health for a number of years and had suffered a brain haemorrhage earlier in the week.

After a private service in Rothesay his hearse was driven into Glasgow for a secular funeral service at the Govan Old Parish Church on 19 August. The cortege passed the BAE Systems Surface Ships yard in Govan, one of the shipyards saved after the collapse of UCS, where hundreds of workers had gathered outside in tribute. The funeral service was attended by notable figures including Ed Balls, Ed Miliband, Gordon Brown, Alex Salmond, Alex Ferguson and Billy Connolly.

Reid is survived by his wife Joan, their three daughters and their three granddaughters, one of whom, Joani Reid, was a Labour Party Councillor in the London Borough of Lewisham. Since the 2024 General Election, Joani Reid is the Labour Member of Parliament for East Kilbride and Strathaven.

The Jimmy Reid Foundation, a left-wing think tank and advocacy group, was established in his memory by the Editorial Board of the Scottish Left Review.

In September 2026 an autobiography co-authored by the writer Brian McGeachan will be published, entitled: Walking with History - The Autobiography of Jimmy Reid. It was compiled from fourteen years of in-depth conversations with McGeachan.

== Bibliography ==
- Reid, Jimmy (1977). Reflections of a Clyde-built man (Reprint ed.). London: Souvenir Press (E&A). ISBN 978-0-285-64824-1.
- Knox, William; McKinlay, Alan (2019). Jimmy Reid: a Clyde-built man. Liverpool (GB): Liverpool University Press. ISBN 1789620848.

Party political offices
Preceded by John Moss	National Secretary of the Young Communist League; 1958–1964	Succeeded by Barney Davis
Preceded by Gordon McLennan	Secretary of the Scottish District of the Communist Party of Great Britain; 1966–1969	Succeeded by Alex Murray
Academic offices
Preceded by George MacLeod	Rector of the University of Glasgow; 1971–1974	Succeeded by Arthur Montford
