= Charlie Whelan =

British political advisor

Charles Alexander James Whelan (born 3 February 1954, north-east Surrey) is former political director of the British trade union Unite. He rose to prominence as spokesman for Labour politician Gordon Brown from 1992 to 1999. He has also worked as a presenter on BBC Radio.

== Early life and career ==
Whelan's father was a Conservative-voting civil servant. Between 1968 and 1974, Whelan went to Ottershaw School, a state boarding school in Ottershaw, Surrey, which had been established in 1948 by Surrey County Council (SCC) as a boarding school for boys of 12 to 18 years of age. It was the first of its kind in the country to be entirely in the hands of a Local Education Authority.

He studied Politics at the City of London Polytechnic (which became the London Guildhall University in 1992).

In 1980 Whelan became a foreign exchange dealer. From 1981 to 1992 he was a researcher and assistant to Jimmy Airlie of the Amalgamated Engineering Union. He was a member of the Communist Party during the 1980s.

== Resignation and later career ==
Whelan resigned as Brown's spokesman in 1999 after leaking information relating to Peter Mandelson's resignation over a home loan. He has since carved out a career in the media, presenting shows for BBC Radio 5 Live and BBC Radio Scotland. Whelan worked as a political director for Unite, Britain's biggest trade union.

In April 2009, it was revealed that Whelan was copied in on emails from Damian McBride which proposed to publish lies about opposition politicians and their families on the internet. The ensuing scandal forced McBride's resignation, followed by personal letters of regret from the Prime Minister to those named. A leading article in The Times on 16 April 2009 called on Unite to review its relationship with Whelan as a result.

== In popular culture ==
In Stephen Frears' made-for-television film The Deal, Charlie Whelan was played by Dexter Fletcher.
