= Jimmy Airlie =

Scottish trade unionist

- Born: 10 November 1936; Renfrew
- Died: 10 March 1997 (aged 60); Erskine
- Occupation: Ship fitter
- Known for: Trade Unionism

Jimmy Airlie (10 November 1936, Renfrew – 10 March 1997, Erskine) was a leading Scottish trade unionist. While a shop steward, along with Sammy Gilmore, Sammy Barr and Jimmy Reid he was particularly remembered for his role as chairman of the Upper Clyde Shipbuilders work-in committee of 1971.

== Trade unionism ==
Airlie was a shop steward for the Amalgamated Engineering Union (AEU) whilst he worked at Fairfield Shipbuilding and Engineering Company. In this capacity he was involved in the Fairfield Experiment (1965-66). He is one of the Shop Stewards interviewed by Sean Connery in his film The Bowler and the Bunnet. When Fairfields was merged into Upper Clyde Shipbuilders in 1968 continued in his role as shop steward. He was chairperson of the Upper Clyde Shipbuilders work-in committee when it was formed in 1971.

In 1983 he was elected to the national executive of the (AEU) . This was the first time a communist had been elected to the AEU's national executive since the early 1970s.

Described in the Scottish Express - "Jimmy Airlie, the most astute strategist of the lot...the lost leaders of the UCS work-in were men of discipline, depth and dignity. What's more, they won." Paying tribute Tam Dalyell said "For any MP who saw Jimmy Airlie in action with employers who proposed to close a factory in his constituency, he was a marvellous sight in full flow".

Airlie was a great public speaker and effective negotiator. His speech style was described as 'joined-up shouting' - he said that a point made 'wittily and succinctly' was more likely to be understood - he said, 'we all have to die sometime, but in the meantime we don't have to be bored to death'. When asked by the press in 1971 whether the workforce at UCS intended to occupy the shipyard, he replied "We are not a foreign power, we were born in that area and we will work-in. The right to work is our birthright and we won't give it up for any hatchetmen".

Although uncompromising in his approach to negotiation and debate, and in his use of robust 'shipyard' language, it was clear that Airlie was highly intelligent and sophisticated in his approach to union matters. He would often advise against industrial action where nothing could be gained, and he believed in building broad alliances to achieve 'progressive' policies. Airlie was greatly influential to modern trade unionism in valuing both principle and pragmatism in full measure. In particular, as a trade union organiser, Airlie displayed the skills to bring together the workforce, even across sectarian divides which were common in the Glasgow shipyards - "Jimmy always seemed to unite them and break these barriers. He made them see the logic of combining together". His involvement in some notable labour disputes in the 1980s was influential: at Ford Motor Company, Caterpillar and Timex.

Charlie Whelan's first job in politics was as researcher/assistant for Airlie. Charlie Whelan is quoted as saying that Airlie was seen as "the most formidable negotiator in the trade union movement, a giant..[who] was also prepared to say to the workforce, 'You're wrong, you've got to go back to work'". Airlie make clear his views on democracy and openness within the unions - "If you become corrupt and lose touch with people you represent, then you deserve to end up in the trash can of history. I genuinely believe that there is no real democracy and freedom for working people unless there is a democracy for working-class institutions like trade unions".

Speaking at Airlie's funeral Campbell Christie "stressed the great respect and love the movement had for a man who dedicated his life to fighting for others - he was not just an outstanding member of the AEEU executive... not just one of the key leaders of the most successful industrial pressure of the last 50 years... he was not just a highly successful negotiator in the motor car industry... not just a member of the TUC general council...'He was all of those things and a giant figure in the trade union movement at a time when the giants were hard to come by'".

== Life ==
Airlie was born in Renfrew in 1936, the son of a boilermaker. He was employed as an apprentice fitter by Lobnitz Simons, a firm known for making dredgers, from 1953 to 1958. He then undertook National Service with the Royal Air Force, serving in Libya as a military policeman. He was a Lance Corporal and met Leif Mills who at the time was an officer senior to him.

On returning to Fairfields Yard after National Service Airlie became a member of the Communist Party of Great Britain, but later in his life, in 1991, he switched his allegiance to the Labour Party. Describing his own political views he said, "I am a Communist. I have been a Communist all my life. My entire career has been devoted to advancing the cause of the working class. There is no substitute for principle. Principle is not a luxury. It is a necessity." Airlie was elected as a shop steward and then convener at the yard.

Airlie married Anne Gordon in 1971, and had a daughter Allison who had 2 children.

Airlie died on 10 March 1997, at the age of 60, following a six-month battle with cancer. At his funeral hundreds attended to pay their respects, including among them the then Shadow Chancellor Gordon Brown, Campbell Christie, Gus Macdonald, Rodney Bickerstaffe, Jimmy Reid, Sammy Barr, and Sammy Gilmore.
