= Alien Nation (disambiguation) =

Alien Nation is an American science fiction media franchise.

Alien Nation may also refer to:

== Alien Nation media franchise ==
- Alien Nation (film), a 1988 motion picture that spawned the franchise
- Alien Nation (comics), comics tie-ins to the franchise
- Alien Nation (novel series), a series of novel tie-ins to the franchise
- Alien Nation (TV series), a 1989–1990 television series based on the film

== Other uses ==
- Alien Nation (album), a comedy album by George Lopez
- "Alien Nation", a song by Scorpions from Face the Heat
- "Alien Nation", a song by Arcade Fire from Pink Elephant
- Alien Nation: Common Sense About America's Immigration Disaster, a 1995 book by Peter Brimelow

== See also ==
- Alienation (disambiguation)
