= Scotstoun Parish Church =

- Scotstoun Parish Church
- 55°52′46″N 4°20′49″W
- Location: Glasgow
- Country: Scotland
- Denomination: Church of Scotland
- Website: scotstounparishchurch.co.uk

History
- Status: Active
- Founder: United Free Church of Scotland
- Dedicated: 1906

Architecture
- Functional status: Parish church
- Architect: Henry Edward Clifford
- Architectural type: Church
- Style: Neo-Gothic
- Years built: 1906

Administration
- Parish: Scotstoun

Listed Building – Category C(S)
- Designated: 10 July 1989
- Reference no.: LB32277

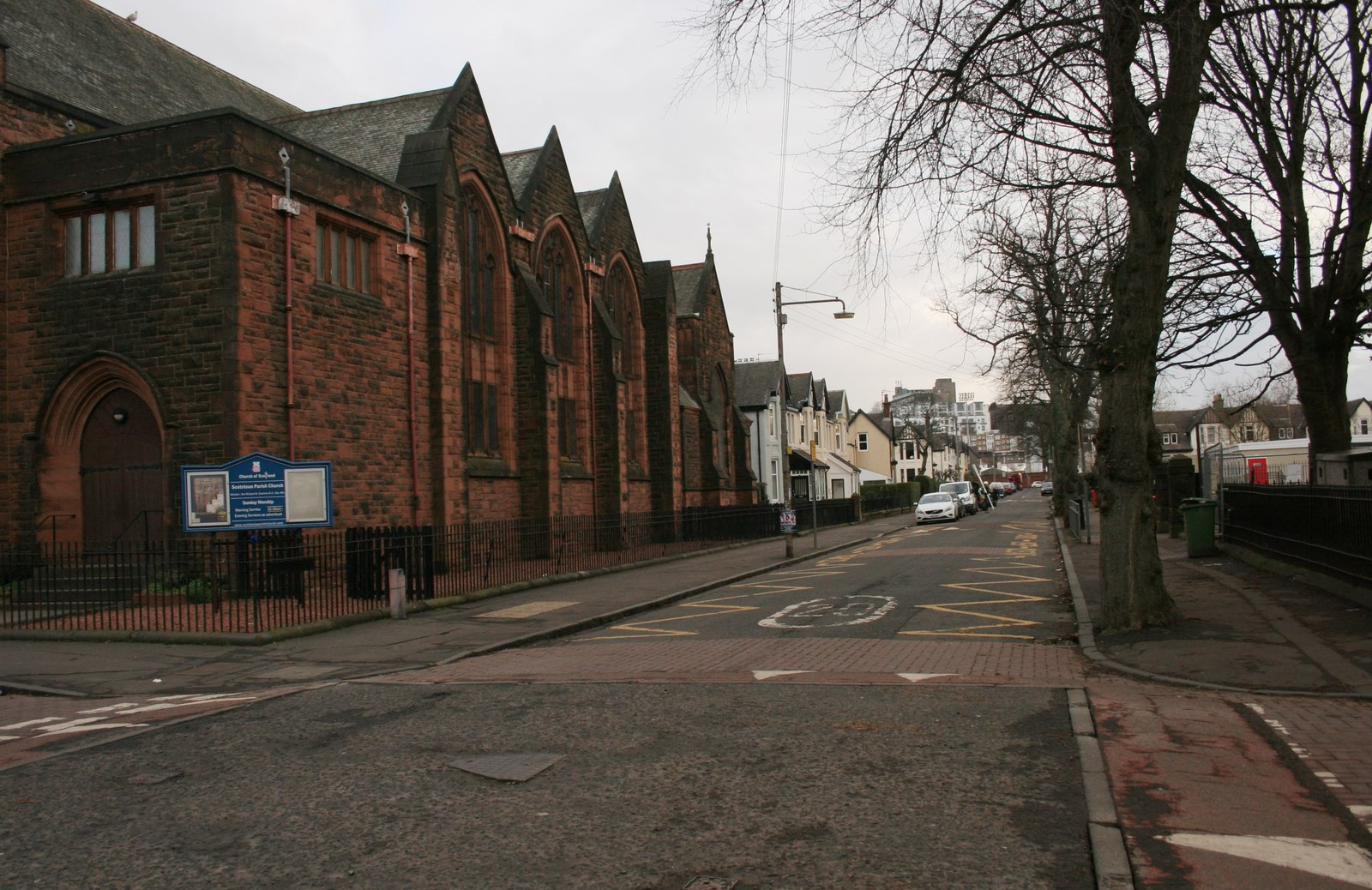
Scotstoun Parish Church

Scotstoun Parish Church is an early-20th-century parish church of the Church of Scotland located in the Scotstoun area of Glasgow.

== History of the building ==
The church was built and dedicated in 1906 on designs by Henry Edward Clifford. The adjacent church hall was built earlier, in 1902, on designs by John Bennie Wilson and served as the first church for the congregation. It was built in the Neo-Gothic style using squared red rubble with polished ashlar dressings.

== History of the congregation ==
The congregation was founded in 1902 as the Scotstoun United Free Church. In 1929, after union with the Church of Scotland, the congregation and church were renamed Scotstoun East Church. In 1987, the congregation of Scotstoun West Church (destroyed by fire and demolished) united with Scotstoun East, while in 1992 the congregation of Whiteinch Church (converted into flats) united with the Scotstoun church to form the Scotstoun and Whiteinch Parish Church. The church was later renamed Scotstoun Parish Church after the re-establishment of Whiteinch Parish Church in February 2000. The Whiteinch congregation uses the community centre for worship since their church building was sold in the 1990s.
