= Govan Shipbuilders =

Former British shipbuilding company

Coordinates: 55°51′50.6″N 4°19′8.9″W

Govan Shipbuilders Limited
- House flag
- Company type: Private
- Industry: Shipbuilding
- Predecessor: Fairfield Shipbuilding and Engineering
- Founded: September 1972
- Defunct: 1988
- Fate: Acquired
- Successor: Kvaerner Govan
- Headquarters: Govan, Scotland, UK
- Key people: Lord Strathalmond (Chairman); Eric Mackie OBE (Managing Director)
- Number of employees: 6000 (1978)
- Parent: British Shipbuilders (1977-1988)
- Subsidiaries: Scotstoun Marine (1973-1980)

Govan Shipbuilders Ltd (GSL) was a British shipbuilding company based on the River Clyde at Glasgow in Scotland. It operated the former Fairfield Shipyard and took its name from the Govan area in which it was located.

== History ==
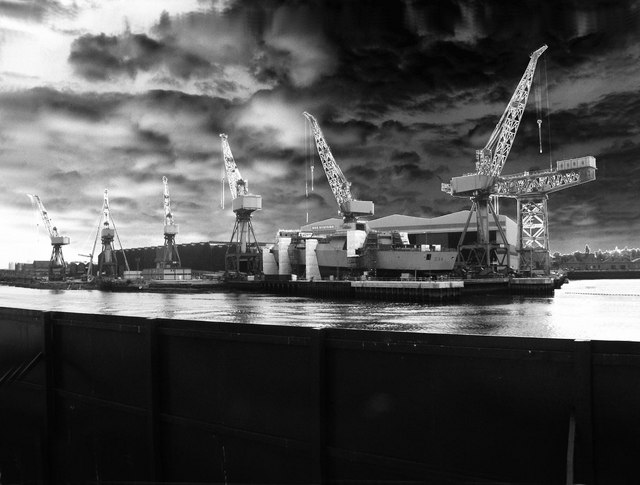
The former Govan Shipbuilders yard is now under the ownership of BAE Systems Surface Ships, building a Type 45 destroyer, 2007.

The company was formed in 1972 by way of a purchase of the former Fairfield Shipyard in Govan from Sir Robert Smith, Liquidator of Upper Clyde Shipbuilders (UCS), itself a product of the amalgamation of several Clydeside yards; Fairfields, Alex Stephens, Charles Connell & Company, Yarrow Shipbuilders and John Brown & Company.

Between 1972 and 1980 Scotstoun Marine, a subsidiary of Govan Shipbuilders, also operated the former Connell shipyard in Scotstoun.

In 1977 the company was nationalised by the Labour government of James Callaghan under the Aircraft and Shipbuilding Industries Act 1977 (c. 3) and subsumed into British Shipbuilders.

Between 1973 and 1988, a total of 53 ships were built by Govan Shipbuilders at the Govan (former Fairfield) shipyard. Investment in plant equipment at the yard during this period included expansion of the steel fabrication facilities and the installation of four 80 ton travelling rope luffing cranes in 1975 by Clarke Chapman, servicing the yard's three slipways, in order to increase the size of units that could be prefabricated. An additional three 80 ton berth cranes from Scotstoun Marine were dismantled and transferred to Govan after the Scotstoun yard closed in 1980 along with two 40 ton cranes from the fitting-out quay; they remained distinctive due to their blue paintwork, with the original Govan cranes being painted red.

In 1988 the Govan Shipbuilders was sold to the Norwegian group Kvaerner Industries and was renamed Kvaerner Govan.
