= Jimmy Reid Foundation =

Scottish think tank and advocacy group

The Jimmy Reid Foundation is a left-wing think tank and advocacy group operating in Scotland. It was established in memory of Jimmy Reid, a well-known trade union activist, by the Editorial Board of the Scottish Left Review. It was officially launched on the first anniversary of Reid's death on 10 August 2011, with its activities focusing primarily upon the publication and dissemination of policy reports and an annual lecture (of which Alex Salmond, Len McCluskey and Nicola Sturgeon have been the first to deliver). The Foundation is run by a Project Board, a Director and Convenor, with an array of patrons including the likes of Alex Ferguson and Aamer Anwar.

== History ==
The agenda of the Foundation is to promote and develop a form of socialism and social democracy in line with the views and perspective of Jimmy Reid. However, the Foundation is independent of any of the political parties that Reid was a member or supporter of, namely, the Communist, Labour and SNP parties. The Foundation's highest-profile project, started in 2013, is the Common Weal, a blueprint for an independent Scotland following the Nordic model of social security. The blueprint was set to be discussed at the Scottish National Party's annual conference in 2013, and was backed by figures such as Dennis Canavan and Jim Mather.

The Common Weal was also discussed at Labour for Independence's first conference in July 2013.

In August 2013, the Jimmy Reid Foundation led calls for a memorial to be erected in honour of those who opposed the outbreak of World War I. Its "alternative World War One Commemoration Committee" identified John Wheatley, John Maclean, Mary Barbour, Helen Crawfurd, Jimmy Maxton, Agnes Dollan, Willie Gallacher, Rev James Barr, and Keir Hardie in its list of prominent opponents of the war.

Following the departure of the Foundation's first director, Robin McAlpine, to concentrate on the Common Weal, the Foundation has concentrated on a smaller number of projects, attempting to gain more subsequent follow through on each of those. The Foundation's work is initiated and monitored by its Project Board consisting of representatives from a number of unions (PCS, UNISON, Unite) as well as progressive and radical academics and policy analysts.

== See also ==
- Yes Scotland
- Scottish Labour Party
- Scottish National Party
- Scottish Green Party
- Scottish Socialist Party
