= George Clark & NEM =

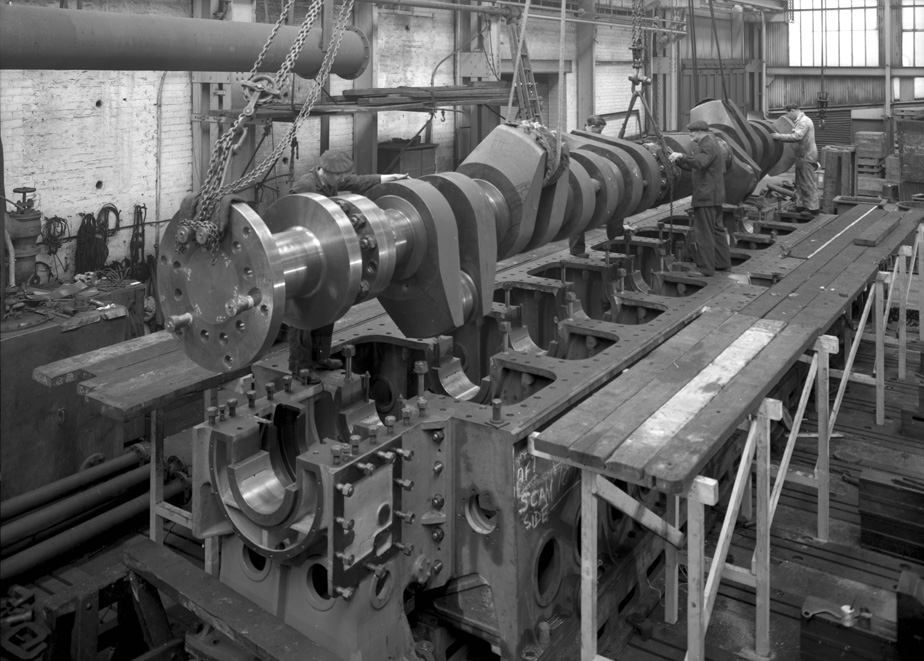
- Inside the Southwick Engine Works of George Clark Ltd, Sunderland, April 1955.
- Company type: Private
- Industry: Marine engineering
- Founded: 1848
- Defunct: 1982
- Fate: Acquired
- Successor: Hawthorn Leslie
- Headquarters: Sunderland, UK
- Key people: J.D. Glanville (Managing Director)

George Clark & NEM was a leading British marine engineering business. The company was based in Sunderland and was a major employer in the area.

== History ==
The company was established in 1848 by George Clark as a general engineering concern based in Sunderland. It built its first marine engine in 1854. In 1938 it was acquired by Richardsons Westgarth & Company who merged the business with North Eastern Marine ('NEM'), another engineering concern which had been founded in 1865 at South Dock in Sunderland and which they had also acquired, to form George Clark & NEM Ltd.

The Company built engines for many ships including the Saga Ruby. In 1977 the company was nationalised and was subsumed within British Shipbuilders and then in 1979 it merged with Hawthorn Leslie to form Clark Hawthorn. It then closed in 1982.
