= Scotstoun Marine =

Scottish shipbuilding company

Scotstoun Marine Ltd was a shipbuilding company in Glasgow, Scotland, on the River Clyde, formed in 1972 to operate the former shipyard of Charles Connell and Company following the collapse of Upper Clyde Shipbuilders into which it had been amalgamated. Scotstoun Marine Ltd operated as a subsidiary of Govan Shipbuilders and was modernised by civil engineering contractor George Leslie Ltd between 1973 and 1978. The yard constructed 15 ships between 1972 and 1980 when the yard closed after 119 years of shipbuilding in which 535 ships had been built.

The site's three modern berth cranes and two fitting out quay cranes were moved upstream to Govan shipyard, although the two concrete building berths remained in situ. Part of the yard's modernised covered facilities were utilised by steel stockholders GKN whilst the riverside berth was utilised by Motherwell Bridge Engineering for heavy fabrication work. In 2005, the former shipyard site was acquired by Malcolm Group as a depot and fabrication yard for its construction division.
