= Melissa Landers =

American novelist

- Born: June 13, 1973 (age 53)
- Writing career
- Pen name: Macy Beckett
- Genres: Science fiction, young adult fiction, fantasy, romance

Melissa Landers (born June 13, 1973) is an American writer of young-adult science fiction and fantasy novels for Disney Hyperion. She also writes contemporary adult romance under the pseudonym Macy Beckett.

== Works ==
Alienated trilogy

- Alienated (2014)
- Invaded (2015)
- United (2016)

Starflight duology

- Starflight (2016)
- Starfall (2017)

The Half King duology

- The Half King (2018)
- Untitled (TBA)

Sultry Springs series (as Macy Beckett)

- Sultry with a Twist (2012)
- A Shot of Sultry (2013)
- Surrender to Sultry (2013)

Dumont Bachelors series (as Macy Beckett)

- Make You Mine (2014)
- Make You Remember (2014)
