= Work-in =

Form of direct action in which workers continue working without pay

A work-in is a form of direct action under which workers whose jobs are under threat resolve to remain in their place of employment and to continue producing, without pay. Their intention is usually to show that their place of work still has long-term viability or that it can be effectively self-managed by the workers.

== Historical examples ==
- 1972: Sydney Opera House work-in
- 1972: The women worker of the Sexton factory in Fakenham, Norfolk, England.
- 1975: Nymboida coal mine work-in
- 1981: BC Telephone work-in

=== Upper Clyde Shipbuilders, 1971–1972 ===
In June 1971, Upper Clyde Shipbuilders in Scotland entered liquidation after the Heath government refused to provide further subsidies to save them from closure. It was announced that two of the firm's three shipyards would close and 1400 people were immediately made redundant. Workers responded by occupying the three shipyards and announced that a group of workers would continue to run the yards. Jimmy Reid, a shop steward and the spokesperson for the group, stated:

Nothing and nobody will come in or go out of the yards without our permission. The world is witnessing a new tactic on behalf of the workers ... We are not going on strike – not even a sit-in strike. We are taking over the yards because we refuse to accept that faceless men can make these decisions.

Marches, concerts, public collections and other fundraising was organised to support the workers involved, collecting nearly £250,000. The work-in gained international attention and public support; John Lennon and Yoko Ono donated £1000, as did the National Union of Mineworkers, and shipbuilders from the Soviet Union donated £2700.

On 18 August, a mass demonstration in support of the workers was held in Glasgow, with 80,000 people marching from Glasgow Green to George Square. Among those who attended the protest were Vic Feather (the TUC general secretary), Billy Connolly, Matt McGinn and Tony Benn. The chief constable of Glasgow's police, David McNee, told the government he could not guarantee public safety if the yard closures went ahead and asked for 5000 extra officers to maintain order.

The work-in ended in spring 1972, with the government committing in February 1972 to supporting UCS with a further £35m of state funding.

=== Harco steel mill, 1971 ===
Harco Steel, a steel manufacturing company based in Campbelltown, Sydney, was dependent on state and federal government contracts, laying off workers once they had been completed and rehiring them as new ones were signed. Workers went on strike often and sometimes won higher wages, but never managed to prevent dismissals. Strikes were less successful because management stockpiled materials before firing workers, meaning strikes would have no effect on the firm's profit in the short term.

On 16 November 1971, the firm dismissed five boilermakers and one ironworker due to a downturn in orders. With past strikes having been generally ineffective, workers met and, taking inspiration from the UCS work-in and factory occupations by French car-makers during May 1968, decided to occupy the steelworks.

The next morning, the workers took control of the factory, declaring management to be "surplus to their requirements". The management called the police and the workers informed the press and other unions in order to publicise their occupation. Due to the level of local support, police took no action.

The occupation, termed a 'stay-put' by workers, continued for four weeks with a 35-hour work week. The Boilermakers Union had campaigned for a 35-hour work week, but this was the first instance of it being implemented. The workers were supported by donations from other unions and worksites and food from the local community.

Because the workers were working rather than striking, Harco could not remove them under the Arbitration Act. Instead, management removed tools, ladders and power to try to shut down the steelworks and called on the Federated Ironworkers' Association (FIA) to intervene in the dispute. Staunchly anti-Communist and known for its compliance with business, the FIA called for a strike at the Harco plant which would have ended the work-in. The workers ignored their union and continued their work-in.

The work-in was defeated by the use of the New South Wales Summary Offenses Act, with Harco issuing trespass notices to the workers ordering them to leave. Under the Commonwealth Industrial Act, any union which supported the work-in could be penalised and so the Boilermakers Union refused to give legal aid to the Harco workers if they continued working.

The case made it to the Supreme Court of New South Wales, where the workers were ordered to leave the steelworks; workers who remained would be fined $1000 per day which could be seized from sales of their personal property. The work-in ended and workers held a Christmas party to celebrate their occupation.

=== LIP watch factory, 1973 ===
After LIP's managing director Jacques Saint-Esprit resigned in 1973, there was uncertainty over the firm's future. The workers' unions at the factory in Besançon, the CGT and the CFDT, opposed administration plans and encouraged workers to support collective action rather than take voluntary redundancies.

At a meeting between workers and the firm's directors in June 1973, a worker grabbed a briefcase from one of the directors and ran off with it. The briefcase's contents laid out the closure of all of LIP's divisions except watchmaking, which was to be sold to a Swiss company, Ébauches SA. The Swiss company planned to lay off at least 960 of LIP's 1427 employees.

On 10 June, workers occupied the LIP factory in order to "safeguard the means of production"; the occupation continued for 57 days. During this time, they seized 65,000 watches (30,000 of which were smuggled out of the factory and hidden across Besançon) and attempted to set up a self-management system under the slogan "We produce, we sell, we pay ourselves". On 18 June, workers endorsed the idea of restarting production, with leading shop steward Charles Piaget using the UCS work-in as an example. Different working processes were created with slower paces and more frequent rotations in the most tiring jobs; 25,000 watches were made during the work-in.

Despite an August 1973 finding 63% of French adults to be sympathetic to the cause of the LIP workers, the national political landscape was not favourable. Prime Minister Pierre Messmer sent 3,000 state police with orders to reclaim the factory and end the occupation. The factory was taken by police on 14 August and the work-in was ended. An agreement was eventually reached between workers and management, with Charles Neuschwander, a left-wing employer, taking over and pledging to employ all remaining workers as part of a new enterprise called SEHEM.

== See also ==
- Die-in
- Sit-in
- Teach-in
- Strike action
- Workplace democracy
- Workers' control
