= Scotstoun =

Area of Glasgow, Scotland

Coordinates: 55.879651°N 4.351549°W

Scotstoun: Scottish Gaelic: Baile an Sgotaich
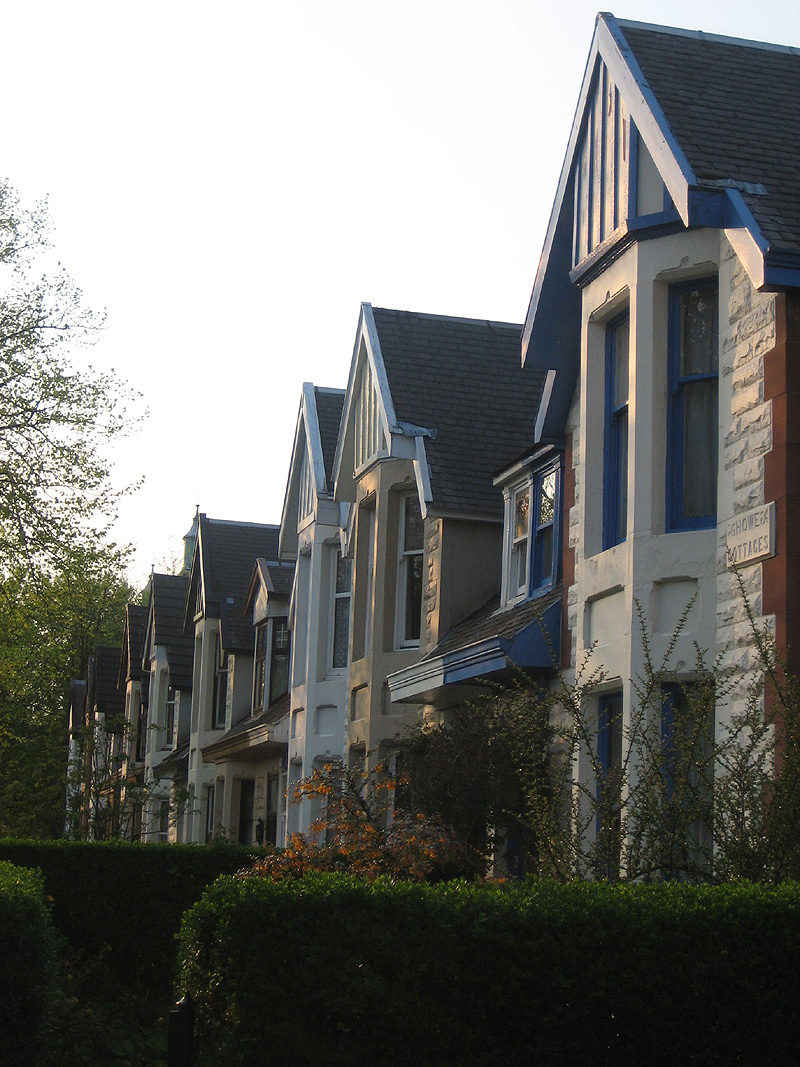
- Earlbank Avenue, typical of Scotstoun's avenues

- Location within Glasgow
- Population: 12,295
- OS grid reference: NS532675
- Council area: Glasgow City Council
- Lieutenancy area: Glasgow
- Country: Scotland
- Sovereign state: United Kingdom
- Post town: GLASGOW
- Postcode district: G14
- Dialling code: 0141
- Police: Scotland
- Fire: Scottish
- Ambulance: Scottish
- UK Parliament: Glasgow West
- Scottish Parliament: Glasgow Anniesland

Scotstoun (Scottish Gaelic: Baile an Sgotaich) is an area of Glasgow, Scotland, west of Glasgow City Centre. It is bounded by Garscadden and Yoker to the west, Victoria Park, Jordanhill and Whiteinch to the east, Jordanhill to the north and the River Clyde (and Braehead beyond) to the south. At the heart of Scotstoun lies Scotstounhill, an enclave of late Victorian and post-war housing centred on Scotstounhill railway station. Scotstoun (along with the Govan shipyard) is home to BAE Systems Surface Ships (formerly Yarrow Shipbuilders), and to the Glasgow Warriors rugby team.

== History ==
Scotstoun was until the early 1860s the site of the Oswald family estate, which was centred on Scotstoun House. By 1861 the westward expansion of the Clyde shipbuilding yards had reached Scotstoun with the opening of the Charles Connell and Company shipyard in 1861 and the new Yarrow Shipbuilders yard in 1906. This led to the break-up of the estate, as portions were sold off for housing, to create Victoria Park and for further industrial development (iron, engineering and shipbuilding) along the river, with companies such as the Coventry Ordnance Works and Albion Motors (1903) locating in the area.

The southern part of Scotstoun is characterised by late 19th/ early 20th century tenements adjoining the old shipyards; to the north, and dating from a similar period, is a grid-like estate of mainly terraced cottage style villas with distinctive English styling in wide tree-lined streets, an early example of Ebenezer Howard-type garden suburb town planning.

The west of the area at Scotstounhill has four (formerly six) high rise tower blocks, the Kingsway flats, and a new housing complex of houses and 'mini multis' built in 2016 by Glasgow Housing Association.

== Current amenities ==
Today parts of Scotstoun is a conservation area, part of which lies in the Jordanhill School catchment, and is popular with families seeking fine period houses with gardens close to the heart of the West End. The local primary school and church lie in the north of the area. South of the main road through the area are tenements, a mixture of privately owned and social housing. To the west of the area is a new housing project of houses and flats. Some of the high rise tower blocks were demolished to make way for the new housing project by Glasgow Housing Association. Several tower blocks are still standing behind the new housing complex. There was formerly a fine red sandstone school, Victoria Drive Secondary, which opened in 1909 and was closed and demolished in 1998. Scotstoun's finest B listed building, the former Scotstoun West church, was mysteriously destroyed by fire then replaced with a Cala development of flats in the 1990s.

Scotstoun is also the site of Scotstoun Leisure Centre opened in 1994, which houses the Scottish National Badminton Academy, a 25-metre swimming pool used by the City of Glasgow Swimming Team and Scotstoun Stadium - where the Glasgow Warriors play. Rugby at Scotstoun goes back to the beginning of the 1900s, when the likes of Glasgow HSFP and Kelvinside Accies, along with others, played there on their journeys to Old Anniesland and Balgray respectively.

Scotstoun Sports Campus is an international sports venue, hosting both squash and the table tennis events during the 2014 Commonwealth Games as well as synchronised swimming events at the 2018 European Championships, co-hosted with Berlin.

Formerly, Scotstoun Showground had no internal corridor under the stand, which meant you had to go outside down the back of the stand to the showers and back which often provided entertainment for the residents of Danes Drive.

A brand new community centre was opened on Balmoral Street on 18 June 2011, called "The Heart of Scotstoun Community Centre". A community cafe opened on Dumbarton Road in 2016 called Cafe Taste that works closely with the local community and provides ethical employment.

Part of Scotstoun is a designated conservation area and has an active residents association called Scotstoun Conservation Area Residents Association. Scotstoun Community Council is active in the area and represents the whole of Scotstoun (other than a small part of Scotstounhill with G13 postcode). The community council meets on the last Thursday of every month (except July and December) at the Heart of Scotstoun community centre. These meetings are open to the public.

=== Scotstoun Primary School ===
Scotstoun Primary School is a primary school built by the Renfrew Landward School Board in 1905 on Earlbank Avenue. The building differs from those built by the Glasgow School Board in many respects, notably in the inclusion of its distinctive towers. The current head teacher is Emma McGill. Scotstoun Primary is part of the Knightswood New Learning Community.

== See also ==
- Glasgow tower blocks
