= Sussex Camock =

English privateer

- Born: c. 1600; Maldon, Essex, Kingdom of England
- Died: 1659 (aged 58–59); Boreham, Essex, England
- Occupations: Privateer, ship captain
- Era: 17th century
- Known for: Mosquito coast trading, establishing Providence Island colony
- Piratical career
- Allegiance: Kingdom of England
- Years active: 1625-1633
- Rank: Captain
- Base of operations: Central American seas
- Commands: Little Neptune; Landguard Fort
- Battles: Cádiz Expedition; English Civil War

Sussex Camock or Sussex Cammock (c. 1600 – 1659) was an English privateer who was involved in establishing the Providence Island colony, a Puritan colony on what is now Isla de Providencia in the western Caribbean. Sussex Camock was the brother of Captain Thomas Cammock.

== Early career ==
Sussex Camock was born in Maldon, Essex, England in about 1600. As a young privateer, he served as ensign under the command of Sir Charles Riche, a relative of his mother, and participated in the unsuccessful Cádiz Expedition of 1625 led by Robert Devereux, 3rd Earl of Essex. In 1627 he was given command of the Little Neptune, part of the private fleet of Robert Rich, 2nd Earl of Warwick. The next year he was given command of the Warwick.

In December 1629 two ships funded by the Earl of Warwick discovered the islands of San Andreas and Santa Catalina in the western Caribbean off the coast of what is now Nicaragua. Camock with his barque Warwicke & Somer Islands remained on San Andreas, while Daniel Elfrith returned to England via Bermuda to report the discovery. At Bermuda, Elfrith's son in law Philip Bell was governor. Bell wrote a letter to Sir Nathaniel Rich, the Earl of Warwick's cousin, making the case for colonizing Santa Caterina. He described the island as "lying in the heart of the Indies & the mouth of the Spaniards." Thus it was an excellent base for privateering against the Spanish ships. Bell's letter led to the formation of the Providence Island Company to organize the settlement.

== Mosquito coast ==
In April 1633, Camock was ordered by the Providence Island Company to bring a pinnace he had recently purchased for the company into the Thames and prepare her for a voyage as quickly as possible. On July 1, he was instructed to sail to Cabo Gracias a Dios, on the Mosquito Coast, by way of the Providence Island colony. He was to leave disorderly persons at Providence and take anyone from Providence who was willing to accompany him. At the Cape he was to contact the natives and trade with them. He should preserve the true worship of God and repress sin. He was also authorized to buy negroes from the Dutch for the Governor of Providence to dispose of. Camock found the Dutch brothers Abraham and Willem Albertzoon Blauvelt at Providence, and they piloted him across to Cape Gracias a Dios on the mainland.

On July 30, 1634 the company wrote to Captain Sussex Camock saying they were glad to hear of his safe arrival at the cape, and his good reception by the natives. They approved of his actions in building a fort and said that the commodities he had sent back were all valuable, especially the "silk grass" flax, which they were calling "Camock's grass". This grass was found superior to ordinary flax. An independent company was given a fourteen-year monopoly on trading Camock's flax and other new materials that might be found in the region. The company noted that there was discontent in Providence, caused by so many men having been taken from it, and that the island needed strengthening. They hoped that Camock could allow Captain Samuel Axe to return to Providence to work on the fortifications there. On 20 April 1635 the Company appointed Camock to the position of Governor of Cape Gratia de Dios. However, the trading station on the cape was abandoned by June 1635.

== Later career ==
During the English Civil War (1642–1651) Camock was Captain of Landguard Fort, Harwich. Sussex Camock died in 1659 at Boreham, Essex, England. John Masefield used his character for the old Pirate Captain Cammock in his 1933 book Captain Margaret.
