= Capture of Tortuga =

1635 Spanish military campaign

Coordinates: 20.004°N 72.711°W

- Part of the Thirty Years' War
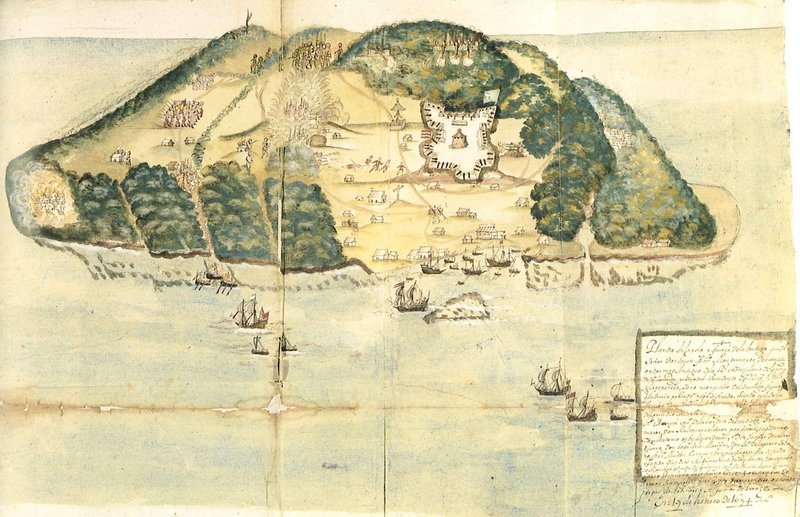
- 1653 Spanish sketch of Tortuga (shows leeward port and Fort de Rocher in the southeast)
Date	21–23 January 1635 (Note: This event is sometimes misdated to 1634, as in. Spanish sources, however, reliably date the event to 1635, as in. Consequently, this date is used in this article. And, who accepts the Spanish dating of 1635, notes, "Du Tertre ... dates [this event] by error in 1638. Labat and Charlevoix, and others copy Du Tertre, while Esquemeling in his History of the Buccaneers with his usual untrustworthiness confuses names and dates bady. In one place he dates the capture in 1630, and in another in 1664 when D'Ogeron was governor".)
Location	Tortuga
Result	Spanish victory

Belligerents
Spanish America; Santo Domingo; Puerto Rico	Old Providence; Association Island; Buccaneers

Commanders and leaders
Alonso de Cereceda (Note: Governor of Santo Domingo ad interim.); Ruy Fernández de Fuenmayor (Note: Military general.); Francisco Turrillo de Yebra (Note: Also surnamed Trujillo. An admiral.); Gonçalo de Frías (Note: A captain.); Enrique Enríquez de Sotomayor (Note: Governor of Puerto Rico.)	Philip Bell; Christopher Wormeley

Strength
200 armed men (Note: As 150 cavalry or lancers, and 50 infantry.); 50 sailors 4 warships	150 to 600 settler men (Note: Including buccaneers. Excluding slaves, women and children.) various sailors 6 merchant frigates (Note: Urcas in Spanish, sorts of frigates used as merchant vessels, with full-bodied hulls, and not as long as frigates used as warships. Plus three pataches and several small craft.)

Casualties and losses
2 killed 4 wounded some drowned	196 killed various wounded 39 captured 2 frigates burnt (Note: Plus one patache burnt.); 1 fort captured (Note: A 6-piece battery and 180 muskets seized.); 1 settlement torched (Note: Plus their dyewood cutting stands and tobacco plantations torched too.)

The capture of Tortuga was a successful Spanish military expedition against English, French and buccaneer settlers in Tortuga, an island off northern Hispaniola in what is now Haiti, in January 1635, during the colonial theatre of the Thirty Years' War. The campaign was commissioned by Santo Domingo, in southern Hispaniola, upon their learning, from an Irish Catholic defector in late 1634, of an illicit and thriving, but poorly defended, settlement on the leeward side of said island. The operation, which got under way after Puerto Rican aid was secured, involved 250 men on four warships, and was led by Ruy Fernández de Fuenmayor, who successfully captured the port, torched the settlement, and routed virtually all colonists from Tortuga, after summarily executing hundreds of them. Their success was lauded by Spanish authorities, but as no garrison had been left behind in Tortuga, the island was soon resettled by French pirates, making said victory short-lived.

Tortuga was first surreptitiously settled in the early 17th century by the English and French, who took to hunting, woodcutting and piracy to sustain themselves. In the early 1630s, they were joined by English tobacco planters from Saint Kitts, in the Leeward Islands, who soon formalised the settlement as Association Island, a dependency of Old Providence, in the Mosquito Gulf, and appointed Christopher Wormeley as governor. Upon the Spanish capture of Association, the Providence Company severely censured Wormeley for his failure to defend the plantation colony, and attempted, but ultimately failed, to resettle the English farmers, leaving Tortuga as a pirate stronghold from the late 1630s, in time for the Golden Age of Caribbean piracy.

The capture of Tortuga is thought to have prompted, in part, later Spanish expeditions against the Dutch in Curaçao and the Puritans in Old Providence, and has been deemed a precursor to the Franco-Spanish War, which opened in May 1635.

== Background ==
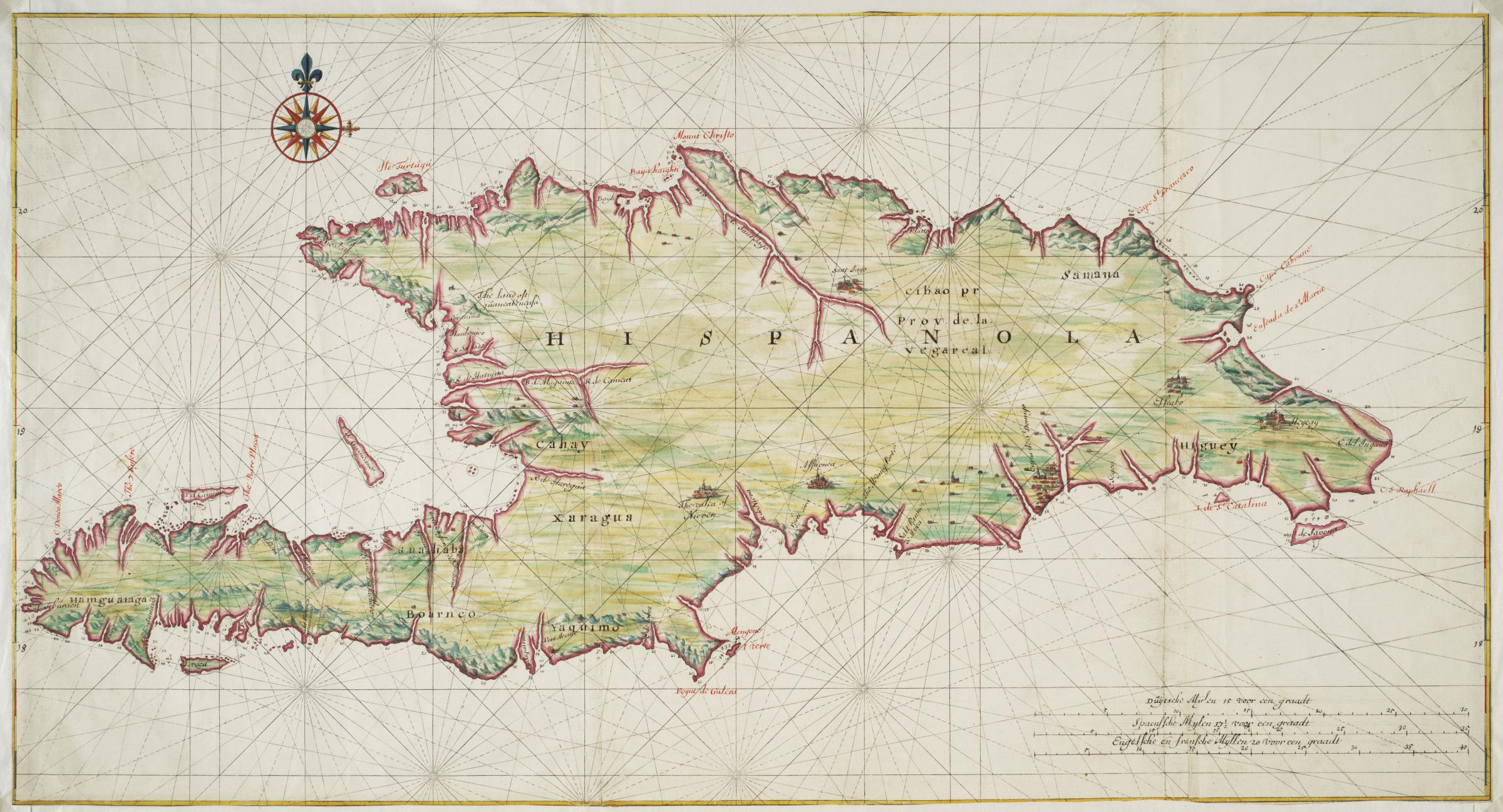
Hispaniola and Tortuga (top left) in mid-17th century

Hispaniolan northeast coast (top) from Bayaha ('Baya-a', left) to the eastern half of Tortuga ('Tortue', mid right) in late 17th century

In the early 17th century, pirates and other seamen from England, France and the Nethelands began staying in the Caribbean even after completing their work or between seafaring trips, during their downtime. They began surreptitiously settling the northern coast of Hispaniola, including the leeward (southern) side of Tortuga, and thereby became buccaneers proper by the late 1620s or early 1630s. To supplement their income from piracy, these settler buccaneers took to hunting and barbecuing game, and to cutting and selling dyewoods.

In 1630, the clandestine Tortuga settlers were joined by approximately 150 English tobacco farmers from Saint Kitts, led there by Anthony Hilton. These new arrivals sought to formalise their illicit settlement, and so petitioned the newly chartered Providence Company for recognition and aid. On 21 July 1631, the said company acquiesced by making Tortuga (now officially Association Island) a dependency of their proprietary colony of Old Providence, and further confirmed Hilton as Association's governor, and provided for the island's defence (with ordnance) and plantation needs (with indentured servants). Upon Hilton's death in 1634, the governorship passed on to his associate, Christopher Wormeley.

Among the servants shipped to Association by the company in the early 1630s had been two Irish Catholics, John Murphy (Note: Also named Juan. Also surnamed Morfa Geraldino y Burco, Morf, Morfa, de Morfa Geraldino. An Irish informant.) and his cousin. Upon Wormeley's inauguration in 1634, they refused to swear allegiance to the English monarch, which protest somehow lead to his cousin's death and Murphy's defection to the Spanish, first to Carthagena and then to Santo Domingo. The Irishman informed Spanish authorities that "there are on the island up to three hundred people, including elderly people, young people, and service people, and they are settled and spread out in a valley measuring three leguas lengthwise along the coast of the said Island with their farms and crops and a large trade with vessels of all nations that come to the island, and that they have an English Governor and are neglectful and lack military discipline, despite there being in the Port a Platform with six pieces of iron artillery, and in the Governor's house some muskets and arquebuses, and that with them there are even thirty African slaves who help them in their crops, and that they go to the mainland of this Island [Hispaniola] to stock up on meat and other things they need".

Thus prompted to action, acting governor Alonso de Cereceda convened a war council which, naturally, resolved to "dislodge the enemy from the said Island and punish their audacity before their greater expansion and fortification", the latter of which was a particular worry, given Tortuga's proximity to Spanish sea lanes, and the settlement's apparently thriving trade in brazilwood and tobacco. Preparations, which involved Puerto Rico, were finalised by about the New Year.

== Capture ==
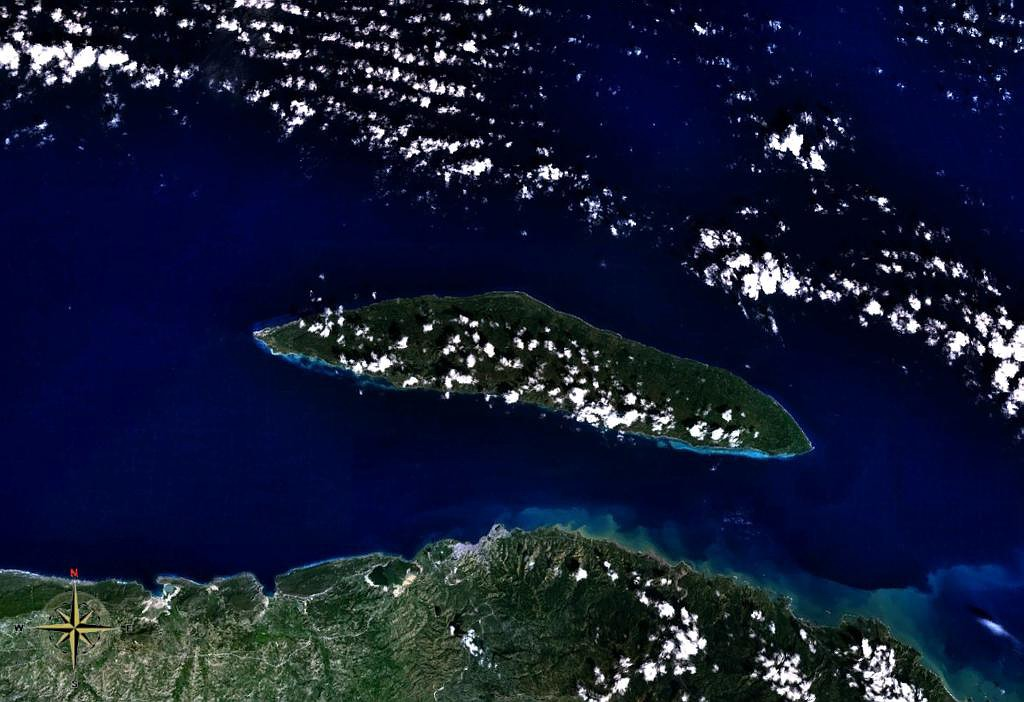
Santo Domingo warships ran aground on coral reefs (light blue) off the southeast coast of Tortuga (centre) in early 1635

Typical Spanish musketeer (left), lancer, and arquebusier (right) in 1630s (modern sketch)

On 4 January 1635, admiral Francisco Turrillo de Yebra set sail from Santo Domingo with 50 infantrymen on four warships, to rendezvous with general Ruy Fernández de Fuenmayor and his 150 lancers in Port Bayaha, in northern Hispaniola. The ships were watered while the officers coordinated their landing, after which the Spanish carried on due northwest, hugging the coast up to the Tortuga Channel. After nightfall on 21 January, Fuenmayor led his flotilla across the channel, to Tortuga's main (leeward) port. The Spanish pilot, however, ran the vessels aground on some reefs during the approach, causing a ruckus which alerted three (non-Spanish) merchant frigates to their presence. During the loud frenzy that followed, the frigates' crews rushed to man the nearby fort and sound the alarm, while the Spanish slipped away from their grounded vessels in canoes, to make a quiet landing, leaving some men behind to provide cover. This opening skirmish in the leeward port resulted in the campaign's first casualties, for both sides. According to a later Spanish report, "they crossed at night so as not to be noticed, and not being able to take the port, where three merchant frigates and a patache were anchored, unaware and unprepared, when they [Fuenmayor] disembarked the men in the part [of the port] where they sought to land, the flagship and the rest of the ships ran aground, and given this confusion, darkness of the night, [and] noise and voices caused by the people throwing themselves into the water, some drowned, among them the alferez of Captain Camacho, Pedro de Vargas".

Having been startled awake by the bugle call, the scene in the nearby settlement apparently mirrored the port's chaos as French and English settlers and buccaneers collected their valuables and attempted to escape the imminent Spanish. At the governor's house, Wormeley likewise set upon retreat, apparently determining that a defence of Association was not wise or feasible now, and managed to make his escape before Fuenmayor arrived. Said Spanish general, with Turrillo, captain Gonçalo de Frías and a detachment of 24 men, marched into town and made a beeline for Wormeley's residence, where an unidentified man, presumed governor by Fuenmayor, opposed them but was quickly despatched with two well-aimed lance throws. Association's "governor" thus slain, the Spanish now set about methodically sacking and torching the settlement, allegedly killing all residents they came across, while the men left behind in the port managed to capture the fort, forcing the foreign merchant vessels to retreat.

By daybreak on 22 January, most (or some) of Association's inhabitants had apparently managed to escape south to Hispaniola, reportedly making the crossing on rickety canoes. Fuenmayor now sent men farther into Tortuga, directing "that all the fields and houses be put to fire". The invasion's last engagement came on 23 January, when some 190 musket-armed settlers or buccaneers, who had evidently stayed (or been left) behind, resolved to oppose the Spanish by marching to their bivouac. Fuenmayor somehow discovered their scheme, though, and met them outside the Spanish camp, at about the midway mark from the settlers' point of departure. This closing battle was reportedly quick and bitter, with heavy casualties inflicted by the Spanish, who themselves sustained only minor losses.

== Aftermath ==
Tortugan captives were sentenced to hard labour building Santo Domingo's colonial fortifications in 1635 (preserved rampart in Ciudad Colonial shown)

On 27 or 28 January, the four stranded Spanish warships were finally removed from Tortuga's southern reefs and brought into port. Fuenmayor spent the following three or four days combing the island, for stragglers or unrazed structures, before finally departing, with the rest of the Spanish following not long thereafter. In Santo Domingo, 39 prisoners from Association were condemened to hard labour for life, and set to building the Spanish city's fortifications.

On 10 April, the Providence Company formally stripped Wormeley of his governorship and banished him from Tortuga, "by reason of his cowardice and negligence in losing the island". He is thought to have relocated to Virginia, where he served in a number public offices. They further instructed Philip Bell, governor of Old Providence, that should Wormeley present himself in said colony, "a very strict eye is to be kept upon him, and he is to be sent home [to London] ... for having 'given us some cause for distaste'".

According to Columbia University historian Nellis Crouse, settlers or buccaneers who could (or did) not flee the Spanish were "hunted down" during Fuenmayor's aforementioned sweep, though they deem it possible that a "handful managed to conceal themselves in out-of-the-way recesses until the Spaniards ... sailed back to San Domingo". In any case, though, the Spanish certainly did not leave a garrison behind in Tortuga, and so the island was eventually resettled within the year (at the latest) or within a few months of Spanish withdrawal (possibly).

In April 1635, the Providence Company appointed Nicholas Reskeimmer (Note: Also surnamed Reiskimmer, Riskinner. Father of privateer James Reiskimmer.) governor of Association Island. He and some 80 uprooted English settlers, with about 150 slaves, landed in the leeward port, aboard the Expectation, by February 1636. Later that year, Juan de Bargas, (Note: Also surnamed Vargas.) under orders from Cereceda, apprehended 59 of their slaves, whom the Spanish then sold to help pay for the Fuenmayor expedition, which had cost Santo Domingo 37,300 reales de plata. By late January 1637, Reskeimmer's settlers had abandoned Association, leaving the island with a French-majority settlement that next came under Spanish assault in 1638, this time by Carlos Ibarra, who "put to the sword those who resisted him and destroyed the houses they had built". These later Spanish offensives were "few and far between" though, and like Fuenmayor's, invariably failed to leave watchmen behind, such that "as soon as warships slipped under the horizon, the brethren of the coast returned to occupy the same sites" in Tortuga.

== Legacy ==
Tortuga's capture indirectly helped cement it as a pirate haven by mid-17th century, a reputation which endures today (pop culture example shown)

The Spanish crown deemed the capture "a complete success" by late 1636, for which seven of Fuenmayor's men, who had distinguished themselves in service, were granted mercedes ('titles and honours') on 22 August, while the general himself was named governor and captain general of Spanish Venezuela on 26 November of that year. This military achievement is thought to have prompted, at least partly, later Spanish campaigns against Old Providence (from mid-1635) and Dutch Curaçao (from 1637). The Providence Company, on the other hand, blamed the failure of Association's defence on Wormeley, who "displayed the utmost cowardice and took instant flight in a small bark for Virginia", according to King's College London historian A. P. Newton.

The capture is thought to have contributed to Tortuga's transition from a settlement which mostly focussed on cash crop farming (while engaging in piracy incidentally) to "a true pirate stronghold" (dealing primarily in piracy), according to Louisiana State University geographer Peter R. Galvin, as Fuenmayor's success completely routed the English plantation owners from the island, whereas Reskeimmer's later attempt to resettle Association failed, leaving a pirate and buccaneer majority in Tortuga (by early 1637), who did not (or could not be made to) submit to Providence Company's plantation-oriented orversight.

== See also ==
- Tortuga in the 17th century – for more on the aftermath
- Capture of Fort Rocher – similar campaign in 1654

== Notes and bibliography ==
=== Bibliography ===
1. anon. (1927). "The Wormeley Family". Virginia Magazine of History and Biography. 35 (4): 455–456. JSTOR 4244177.
2. anon. (1928). "The Wormeley Family (Continued)". Virginia Magazine of History and Biography. 36 (1): 98–101. JSTOR 4244188.
3. anon. (1941). "Colección Lugo : Archivo General de Indias : Reales órdenes de las libretas 15, 16, 44, 46 y 47". Boletín del Archivo General de la Nación. 4 (17): 223–275. ISSN 1012-9472.
4. anon. (1942a). "Relaciones Históricas de Santo Domingo (Colección y notas de EMILIO RODRIGUEZ DEMORIZI)". Boletín del Archivo General de la Nación. 5 (20–21): 3–120. ISSN 1012-9472.
5. anon. (1942b). "Colección Lugo (continuación de la libreta 15)". Boletín del Archivo General de la Nación. 5 (23): 293–341. ISSN 1012-9472.
6. anon. (1942c). "Colección Lugo (continuación de la libreta 35)". Boletín del Archivo General de la Nación. 5 (24–25): 355–414. ISSN 1012-9472.
7. anon. (1943a). "Colección Lugo (continuación de la libreta 36)". Boletín del Archivo General de la Nación. 6 (26–27): 111–115. ISSN 1012-9472.
8. anon. (1943b). "Colección Lugo (continuación de la libreta 36)". Boletín del Archivo General de la Nación. 6 (28–29): 254–268. ISSN 1012-9472.
9. anon. (1943c). "Colección Lugo (continuación de la libreta 38)". Boletín del Archivo General de la Nación. 6 (30–31): 404–408. ISSN 1012-9472.
10. anon. (1944a). "Colección Lugo (continuación de la libreta 38)". Boletín del Archivo General de la Nación. 7 (32–33): 144–190. ISSN 1012-9472.
11. anon. (1944b). "Colección Lugo (continuación de la libreta 39)". Boletín del Archivo General de la Nación. 7 (34–35): 217–279. ISSN 1012-9472.
12. Block, Kristen; Shaw, Jenny (2011). "Subjects Without an Empire: The Irish in the Early Modern Caribbean". Past & Present (210): 33–60. doi:10.1093/pastj/gtq059. JSTOR 23015371.
13. Crouse, Nellis M. (1940). French pioneers in the West Indies, 1624-1664 (1st ed.). New York: Columbia University Press. hdl:2027/uc1.c031248717. OCLC 485234.
14. Fernández Duro, Cesário (1899). AÑOS 1621 - 1652. Armada española desde la unión de los reinos de Castilla y de León. Vol. 5 (1st ed.). Madrid: Est. tipográfico "Sucesores de Rivadeneyra". hdl:2027/mdp.39015036698697. OCLC 4413652.
15. Galvin, Peter R. (1991). The pirates' wake: A geography of piracy and pirates as geographers in colonial Spanish America, 1536-1718. (Volumes I and II) (PhD). Baton Rouge, Louis.: Louisiana State University. ProQuest 303961341.
16. Haring, Clarence Henry (1910). Buccaneers in the West Indies in the Seventeenth Century (1st ed.). London: Methuen & Co.
17. Lane, Kris (2016) [First published 1998 by M. E. Sharpe]. Pillaging the empire : global piracy on the high seas, 1500-1750 (2nd ed.). New York: Routledge. OCLC 904755960.
18. Latimer, Jon (2009). Buccaneers of the Caribbean: How Piracy Forged an Empire (1st ed.). Cambridge, MA: Harvard University Press. doi:10.4159/9780674054172. ISBN 9780674054172.
19. Marley, David F. (1998). Wars of the Americas: a chronology of armed conflict in the New World, 1492 to the present (1st ed.). Santa Barbara, CA: ABC-CLIO. OCLC 39024726.
20. Moreau, Jean-Pierre (2012) [First Published 2006 by Tallandier]. Pirates: flibuste et piraterie dans la Caraïbe et les mers du sud (1522-1725) [Piratas: filibusterismo y piratería en el Caribe y en los mares el sur (1522-1725)]. Papeles del tiempo no. 6. Translated by Ridruejo Ramos, Cristina. Boadilla del Monte (Madrid): Antonio Machado Libros. OCLC 840414526.
21. Newton, Arthur Percival (1914). The colonising activities of the English Puritans: the last phase of the Elizabethan struggle with Spain. Yale Historical Publications: Miscellany. Vol. 1 (1st ed.). New Haven, CT: Yale University Press. hdl:2027/hvd.32044014678932. OCLC 2993127.
22. Riches, W. T. M. (1999). "White Slaves, Black Servants and the Question of Providence: Servitude and Slavery in Colonial Virginia 1609-1705". Irish Journal of American Studies. 8 (sn): 1–33. JSTOR 30002672.
23. Robison, Todd M. (1998). "Subject to the power of the Infernall Spiritt" : Puritans, Privateers, and the Genesis of Buccaneers (MA). Greenville, N. Car.: East Carolina University. hdl:10342/6655.
24. Rodríguez de la Torre, Fernando (3 May 2018). "Fernández de Fuenmayor Figueroa, Ruy". Diccionario biográfico electrónico. Real Academia de la Historia.
25. Sainsbury, W. Noel, ed. (1860). 1574-1660. Calendar of State Papers Colonial, America and West Indies. Vol. 1 (1st ed.). London: Her Majesty's Stationery Office. OCLC 456586992.
26. Schmitt, Casey (2017). "Pirates, Planting, and the Rights of Mankind in Seventeenth-Century Tortuga". Latin Americanist. 61 (4): 584–599. doi:10.1111/tla.12167. S2CID 148627684.
27. Vaissière, Pierre de (1906). Les origines de la colonisation et la formation de la société française à Saint-Domingue. Paris: Aux Bureaux de la Revue. OCLC 27932200.
28. Vaissière, Pierre de (1909). Saint-Domingue : la société et la vie créoles sous l'ancien régime (1629-1789). Paris: Perrin et Cie. OCLC 591151533.
29. Winzerling, E. O. (1946). Beginning of British Honduras, 1506-1765 (1st ed.). New York: North River Press. OCLC 1892890.
