= Seaflower (ship) =

Sailing ship name used since the 1600s

Seaflower (or Sea Flower) was the name of several sailing ships operating in the Atlantic Ocean and Caribbean Sea in the 1600s and 1700s. The first Seaflower, regarded as sister ship to the Mayflower, also transported settlers to the New World, specifically to Jamestown, Virginia, colony in 1621. It was most notable for helping settle Puritans on the Caribbean Providence Island colony in 1631. The Colombian Marine Protected Area and Biosphere Reserve surrounding the islands is named after the ship.

== First ship ==
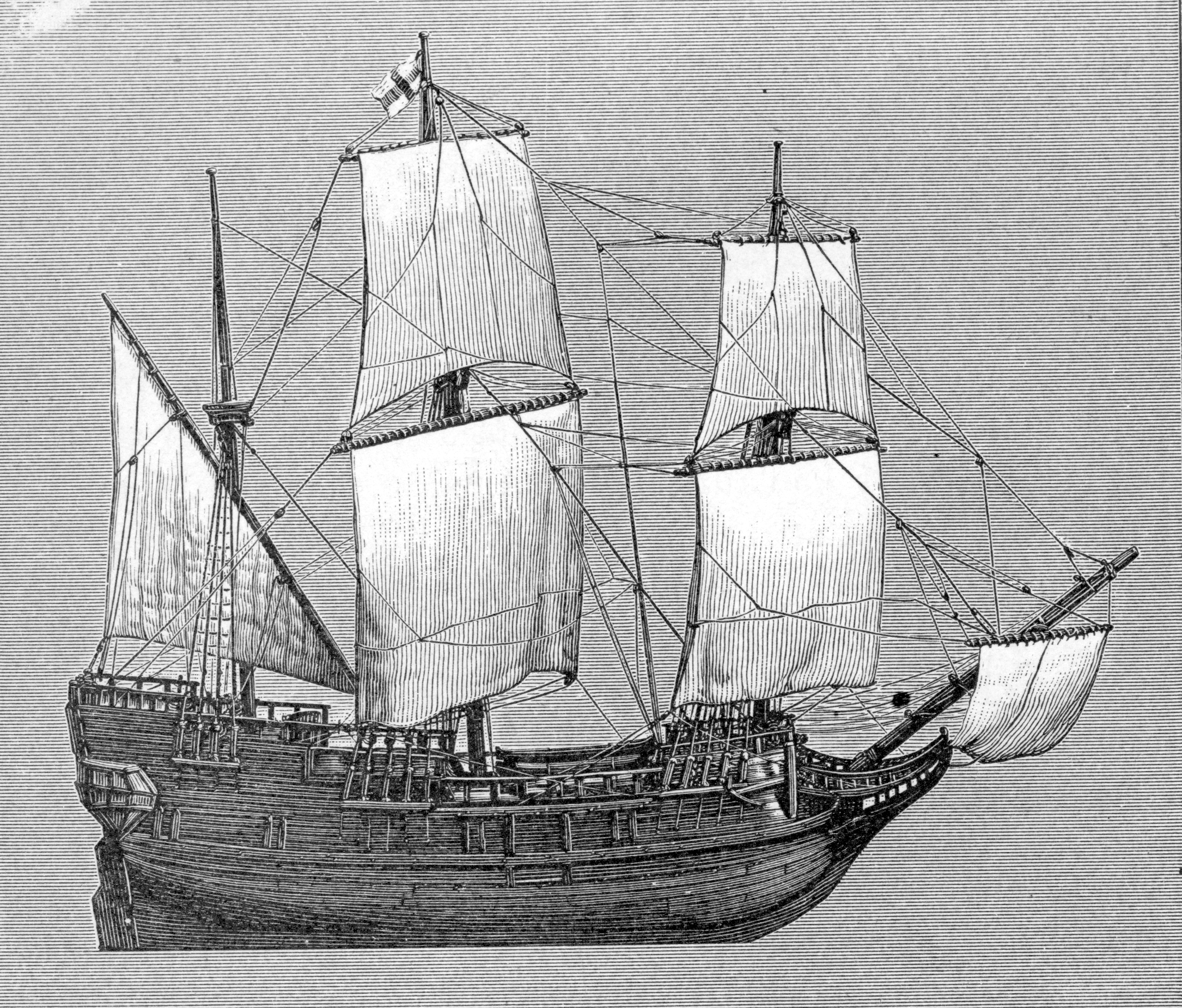
Engraving of the Dutch fluyt Mayflower (sister ship to the Seaflower model of c. 1620)

Seaflower (or Seaflour) was 140 tons, likely a fluyt, operating out of London in 1620, and frequented Bermuda (then known as the Somers Isles) and Virginia Colony.

A Sea Flower is documented to have been captained by Ralph Hamor with 120 settlers who arrived in Virginia colony, February, 1621/22 (O.S./N.S). This ship also sailed back to England (arriving in June, 1622) with news of the Indian attacks on Englishmen that began in March.

Some time before March 20, 1622/23 (O.S./N.S.), the ship was accidentally sunk in Bermuda by a gunpowder explosion. Apparently the explosion was caused by the unnamed captain's son mishandling lighted tobacco in the gunroom. It was carrying supplies for a relief mission to Virginia.

== Second ship ==
Records indicate that the a second ship was named Sea Flower (or Seafloure) operating in 1624/25. It is unknown whether the first or second ship were distinctly different in design or construction.

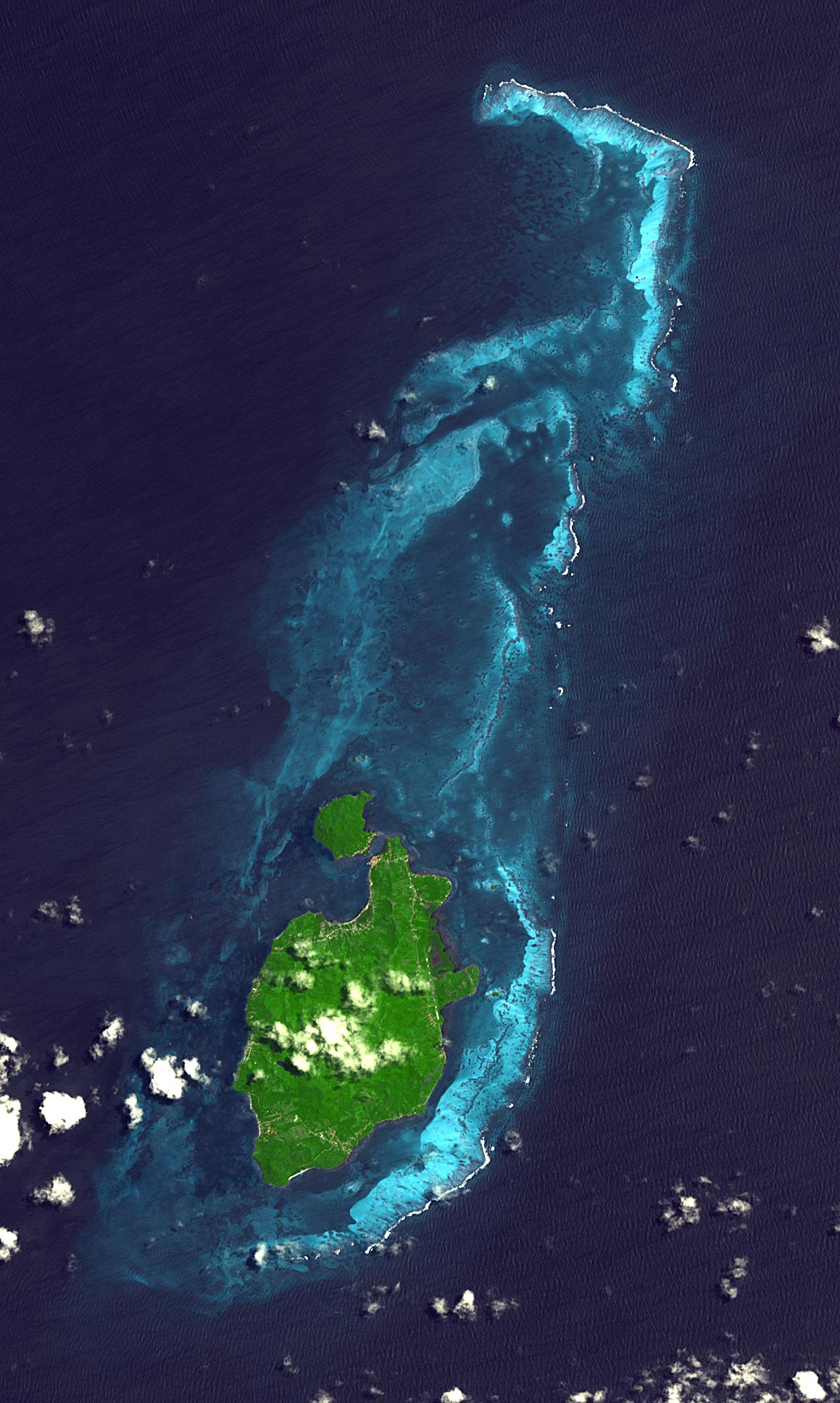
Satellite photo of Archipelago of San Andrés, Providencia and Santa Catalina--part of the ship's namesake Seaflower Marine Protected Area

In 1629, privateer and Captain Daniel Elfrith (aboard the Robert) scouted the archipelago of "Santa Calatina" for riches and as a staging point for Spanish ship plundering. The Earl of Warwick was looking for a new location to build a colony, yielding the setup of Providence Island Company. In c. February 1631, 100 men and boys (mostly Puritans recruited from Essex, England) boarded the Seaflower, sailing from Deptford to Providence Island. Ninety passengers settled the island in c. May 1631, intending to load the ship with exotic plants and produce for profit in London.

Seaflower returned to London, England, in March, 1632. It was attacked-at-sea by Spanish during the return voyage, with Captain John Tanner and crew narrowly escaping. The ship's cargo was only a small batch of poor quality tobacco. Later, the Seaflower returned to Providence Island and was loaded again, this time with 1 tonne (1,000 kg) of "mechoacan potatoes" (Ipomoea purga), used as a medicine.

Between 1671 and 1675, a ship classified as a ketch, called the Sea-flower, operated in Barbados, Jamaica, and Boston, Massachusetts. The Sea-flower was ordered (by owner, John Hull) from Boston to Long Island to collect whale oil for trade in England, captained by a John Harris. In autumn 1676, the Seaflower was in use as a transport for slaves from Africa to the Caribbean. During and after King Phillip's War, the Seaflower was used to transport Native Americans as slaves to Bermuda and other Caribbean colonies.

In 1696, notorious pirates Henry Every and Joseph Faro used a "sloop" named Sea Flower during their time in and around Rhode Island.

== Other ships ==
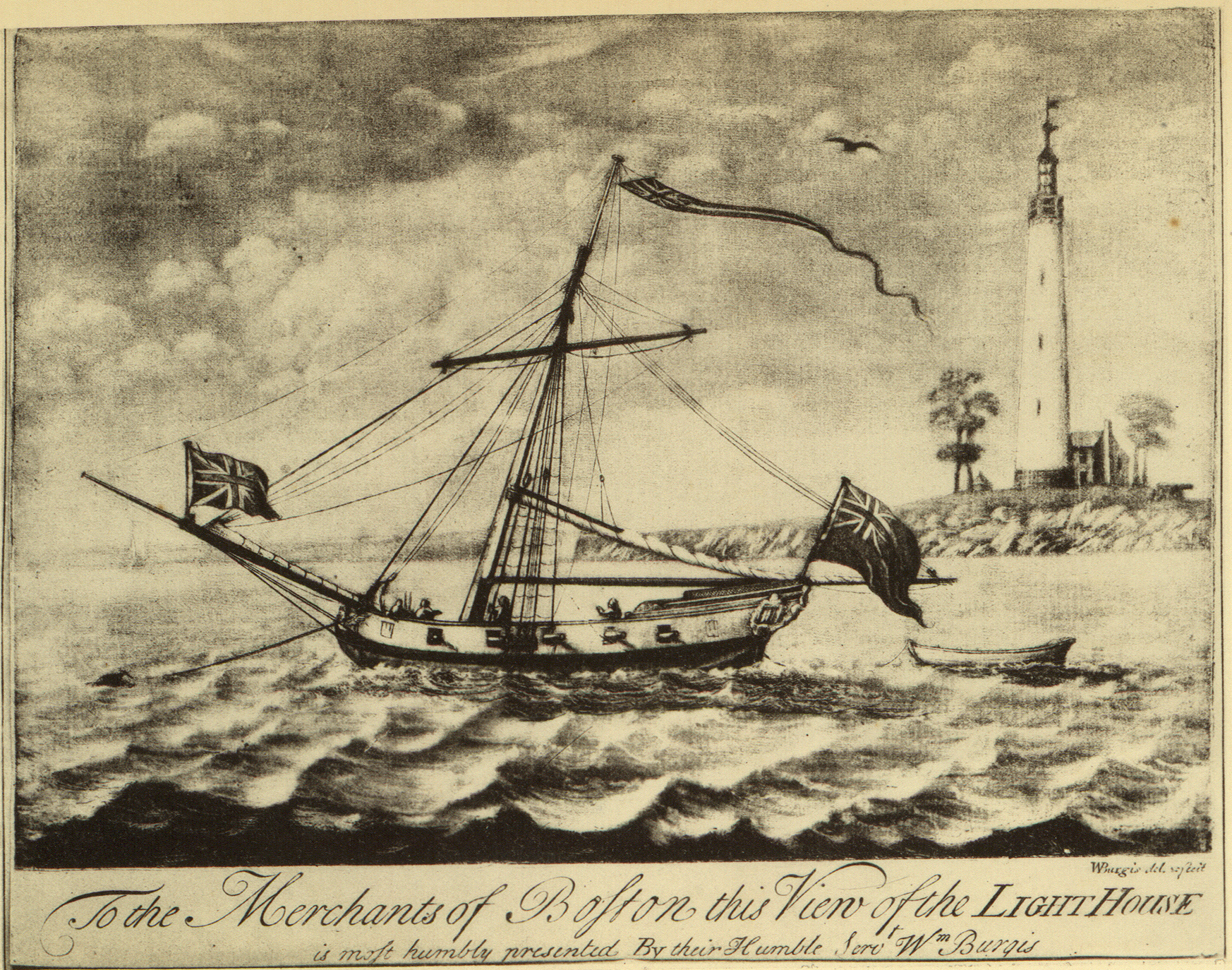
1729 drawing of an "armed sloop" in Boston Harbor

Diagram of a Bermuda sloop

In 1699, a 35-ton ketch named Sea Flower was captained by a Samuel Lambert.

A possible other ship operating with the name Seaflower, described as a Bermuda sloop that supported sea salt raking, was seized in 1701 in the Turks and Caicos Islands and impounded.

During Queen Anne's War, a "new sloop" (probably a sloop-of-war) by the name of Seaflower captained by Cyprian Southack from 1702 to 1703. The ship was crewed by 50 men and had six guns, and operated around Boston.

In c. 1704, a Seaflower was partially owned and commanded by a privateer Captain named Stevens. Accompanied by another sea captain, Regnier Tongrelow, the Seaflower raided villages in Tabasco, Mexico, using a letter of marque from the Governor of Rhode Island (John Cranston). An uprising occurred, and Stevens was captured. Tongerlou took command of Seaflower and privateered around Curaçao. This same sloop was sunk on November 25, 1704, in a gale near Cape Henry.

In 1706–1707, a sloop was built in Salem Harbor for shipping items to Surinam. This vessel was called Johanna but also named Sea Flower, was 18-feet wide and had a deck designed in "Rhode Island fashion" (rounded house).

In 1709, a 20-Ton "snow or barke" named Sea Flower was built in Newburyport, Massachusetts.

== See also ==
- HMS Seaflower
- Mayflower: A Story of Courage, Community, and War
