= Governor Butler =

Governor Butler may refer to:

- Benjamin Butler (1818–1893), 33rd Governor of Massachusetts
- David Butler (politician) (1829–1891), 1st Governor of Nebraska
- Ezra Butler (1763–1838), 11th Governor of Vermont
- Harcourt Butler (1869–1938), Governor of Burma from 1923 to 1927
- Montagu Sherard Dawes Butler (1873–1955), Governor of the Central Provinces from 1925 to 1933
- Nathaniel Butler (born 1578), Governor of Bermuda from 1619 to 1622 and Governor of Providence Island from 1638 to 1640
- Pierce Mason Butler (1798–1847), 56th Governor of South Carolina
- Robert Butler (U.S. commander), Acting Governor of East Florida in 1821
- Thomas Butler, 6th Earl of Ossory (1634–1680), Governor of Tangier in 1680
