= Daniel Elfrith =

- Born: fl. 1607; England
- Died: 1641
- Piratical career
- Type: Privateer
- Allegiance: England
- Years active: 1610s–1640s
- Rank: Admiral
- Base of operations: Bermuda
- Commands: Robert; Treasurer
- Later work: Colonist

Daniel Elfrith (fl. 1607–1641) was a 17th-century English privateer, colonist and slave trader. In the service of the Earl of Warwick, Elfrith was involved in privateering expeditions against the Spanish from his base in Bermuda. He was particularly known for capturing Spanish slave ships bound for the Spanish Main and selling the slaves himself to rival colonies in the Caribbean and the American colonies.

He and John Jope were the first men to arrive in the English Colony of Virginia to sell slaves. Arriving only four days ahead his partner, Jope had sold the first African slaves in the American colonies in exchange for provisions, however Elfrith's arrival sparked considerably more controversy and was turned away by the colony.

He is also one of the earliest Englishmen, along with Sussex Camock, to discover and later take part in the initial settlement of the Providence Island colony in 1629. A personal friend of the Earl of Warwick, his son-in-law Philip Bell became the colony's first governor while he assumed the position of its admiral.

== Biography ==
=== 1610s ===
An active privateer in the West Indies as early as 1607, Elfrith commanded the Treasurer (owned by the Earl of Warwick) for several years. In mid-1613, Elfrith arrived in Bermuda with a Spanish caravel full of grain for the starving island colonists. As England and Spain were not at war, this was technically considered an act of piracy although this fact went unnoticed by the colony. However, the ship also contained black rats which escaped from the ship as the grain was being unloaded in a harbor off St. George's. They quickly bred and were soon nesting in palm trees as well as the thatched roofs of cottages, churches and storehouses. The rats dug holes in the soft coral, feeding on corn and wheat in storehouses and eating the crops and other plants grown by the colony. Despite the colonists attempts to exterminate them, which included using traps, hunting dogs and setting cats into the wild, the rats plagued the colony for several years before the problem was finally brought under control.

In early 1618, Elfrith was hired by Robert Rich, 2nd Earl of Warwick, Lord de la Warr, and others to captain Treasurer for a privateering expedition to the West Indies. His employers managed to obtain a privateering commission from Charles Emmanuel I through his ambassador to England, Count Scarnafissi. He left England in late April or early May and arrived at the Colony of Virginia (shortly after the Neptune under Captain Henry Spelman of Jamestown). Their arrival was said to have "brought a most pestilent disease (called the bloody flux) which infected almost all the whole colony. That disease, notwithstanding all our former afflictions, was never known before amongst us". Five years later, a lawsuit was brought before the court of admiralty in which the Earl of Warwick was accused by Edward Brewster and other colonists of outfitting the Neptune and the Treasurer with arms and ammunition instead of the badly needed provisions and supplies, such as fishing tackle, that they were promised.

In mid-July 1619, he and John Jope of the White Lion captured the Portuguese slaver São João Bautista carrying around 370 Angolans taken prisoner during Portugal's war in Luanda. The two privateers intercepted the ship as it sailed towards Veracruz and escaped with at least 200 slaves, Elfrith taking the majority of them as his ship was larger while Jope took fewer than 30 men and women. They both headed towards the Colony of Virginia, a known safe haven for English privateers under Governor Samuel Argall, with Jope reaching the colony four days ahead of Elfrith and successfully selling his cargo of slaves. Elfrith's arrival was far less welcoming, learning that Charles Emmanuel I had made peace with Spain (thus invalidating his privateering commission) and that Argall had been replaced as governor. He instead returned to Bermuda where the slaves were put to work on the estate of his employer the Earl of Warwick.

However, he did return to Virginia periodically while on privateering voyages against the Spanish during the next year. Acting under orders from Governor Argall, who may have misrepresented the Earl of Warwick to justify his activities, he continued raiding Spanish shipping. Nathaniel Butler, governor of Bermuda and protégé of the Earl of Warwick, wrote to the Earl reporting that Elfrith's vessel was "in an unseaworthy condition and with her a number of negros" when he arrived in the island later that year. He further stated that

..he had disposed of his lordships negroes according to instructions, but that the Treasurer's people were dangerous-tongued fellows and had given out secretly that, if they were not paid to their uttermost penny of wages, they would go to the Spanish Ambassador [Diego Sarmiento d'Acuna de Gondomar] and tell all.

=== 1620s ===
While on a privateering expedition with Captain Sussex Camock of the bark Somer Ilands in 1625, Elfrith and Camock discovered two islands off the coast of Nicaragua, both separated 50 miles apart from each other. Camock stayed with 30 of his men to explore one of the islands, San Andrés, while Elfrith took the Warwicke back to Bermuda bringing news of Providence Island. Governor Bell wrote on behalf of Elfrith to Sir Nathaniel Rich, a businessman and cousin of the Earl of Warwick, who presented a proposal for colonizing the island noting its strategic location "lying in the heart of the Indies & the mouth of the Spaniards". Although this also meant the island would be subject to Spanish attacks, Bell assured Rich that the island would become invincible once fortified and make a highly valued base for privateers. Bell also pointed out that San Andreas, lower and more favorable for farming, could never be made "half so strong".

Elfrith was appointed admiral of the colony's military forces in 1631, and Black Rock Fort the following year, remaining the overall military commander for over seven years. During this time, Elfrith served as a guide to other privateers and sea captains arriving in the Caribbean. As early as 1631, he warned of places where English ships might be attacked by natives or escaped slaves including the areas of Dominica and Trujillo.

That same year, he left on an unauthorized expedition to Central America where he attacked and captured a Spanish frigate in Cape Gracias a Dios although he was forced to leave behind a pinnace before returning to Providence Island. This attack was considered an act of piracy as he did not have a letter of marque from the Providence Island Company. The incident was also condemned by the colonists, concerned that the colony might be seen as a base for privateering, and wrote to friends and family in England believing Elfrith's reckless behavior was endangering the colony. Elfrith's raid not only revealed the colony's presence to the Spaniards but left the colony open to attack before adequate fortifications could be built. It is speculated that Elfrith may have tried to intentionally provoke the Spaniards to attack the colony believing the privateering commissions would be granted in order to retaliate. Later that year, Elfrith entertained the Dutch privateer Diego El Mulato in the colony further angering the residents and the PIC. Although an enemy of the Spanish and a well-known officer under Piet Hein, it was thought dangerous to invite any privateer into the colony to see its defenses.

In an effort to make peace with the company, he gave them his Logbook which contained an elaborate manuscript describing the coastlines and the navigation directions of the Caribbean. Considered by modern editors and cartographers as "remarkably accurate", Elfrith wrote that he had compiled this information during his exploration and privateering voyages for his own use and felt that he should make it available to English captains as many of the other "ancient seamen" who also knew these charts were now dead and that the "drafts and platts made in England were very false". Also included were details for the approaches of the Mosquito Coast and the Bay of Trujilo as well as Providence Island itself.

=== 1630s ===
In 1632, he and Samuel Axe, the other principal military commander, became involved in an argument resulting in Axe leaving the colony and the PIC. A dispute between the two first arose at the first harvest of the island's first tobacco crop. The PIC had made a vague mention of Elfrith, Axe and Bell receiving a portion for their efforts in establishing the colony with Elfrith and Axe arguing over their shares. The two also disagreed of the strategic value of Warwick Fort. Axe ultimately decided to leave the colony because of this dispute.

In 1636, Elfrith resumed privateering upon receiving a letter of marque from the PIC. He was replaced by Governor Robert Hunt in April 1638, however he continued as a privateer until 1641.
