= Samuel Rishworth =

Colombian politician

Samuel Rishworth was a Councillor of the Providence Island colony and one of the first English abolitionists.

Rishworth arrived at Providence Island with Henry Halhead in 1632 aboard the ship Charity.
