= Governor Hunt =

Governor Hunt may refer to:

- Alexander Cameron Hunt (1825–1894), Governor of the Territory of Colorado
- Frank W. Hunt (1861–1906), 5th Governor of Idaho
- George W. P. Hunt (1859–1934), Governor of Arizona
- H. Guy Hunt (1933–2009), 49th Governor of Alabama
- Jim Hunt (born 1937), 69th and 71st Governor of North Carolina
- Lester C. Hunt (1892–1954), 19th Governor of Wyoming
- Rex Hunt (governor) (1926–2012), Governor of the Falkland Islands from 1982 to 1985
- Robert Hunt (governor) (fl. 1630s), Governor of the Providence Island colony in the western Caribbean sea from 1636 to 1638
- Washington Hunt (1811–1867), 17th Governor of New York
