= Providence Island colony =

English chartered colony in the Bay of Moskitia (1630–1641)

The Governor and Company of Adventurers of the City of Westminster for the Plantation of the Islands of Providence or Catalina, Henrietta or Andrea, and the adjacent islands lying upon the coast of America
- 1630–1641
- Flag

- Old Providence Island
- Status: Proprietary colony of England
- Capital: New Westminster; 13°20′56″N 81°22′29″W
- Official languages: English
- Religion: Puritanism

Government
  - Monarch: James VI & I (first); Charles I (last)
- Governor
  - 1630–1636: Philip Bell
  - 1636–1638: Robert Hunt
  - 1638–1640: Nathaniel Butler
- History
  - Creation of the Providence Island Company: 4 December, 1630
  - First explored by England under Daniel Elfrith: 1629
  - Landing of the Seaflower on Providence Island: 1631
  - Spanish capture of Providencia: 24 May, 1641
- Currency: Pound sterling and Spanish dollar
Succeeded by
New Kingdom of Granada
- Today part of: Colombia; Nicaragua; Haiti

The Providence Island colony was established in 1630 by English Puritans on Providence Island. It was founded and controlled by a group of English investors, the Providence Island Company.

Although intended to be a model Puritan colony engaged in agriculture, it also functioned as a base for privateers operating against Spanish ships and settlements in the region. In 1641, Spanish and Portuguese forces, after two previous attempts, finally penetrated the harbour's defences and captured the colony. The Spanish removed all the English settlers from the island but kept the structures. This garrison was maintained on the island, now called Santa Catalina again, until 1666.

== Location ==
Isla de Providencia, the adjacent Santa Catalina island, and four smaller islands lie within a wide lagoon surrounded by a massive coral reef. They are the visible part of a stratovolcano that rises from the sea floor, extinct for the last four million years. The total area of the islands is 18 square kilometres (6.9 sq mi). Providencia is 6.5 by 4 kilometres (4.0 by 2.5 mi). Santa Catalina island to the north is 1.5 by 1.25 kilometres (0.93 by 0.78 mi). Providencia has a central peak 360 metres (1,180 ft) high, from which spines run down to the sea enclosing fertile valleys. Temperatures are around 29 °C (84 °F) all year. Easterly trade winds are normal during all seasons, bringing the most rain in the autumn. Summers are relatively dry. The surrounding coral reefs make the approach difficult for those who do not know the waters. The two larger islands were once one, called Santa Catalina by the Spanish, but some time between 1635 and 1641, the colonists cut a neck of land between them to make a secure retreat on what is now the small island of Santa Catalina.

== Origin of the colony ==
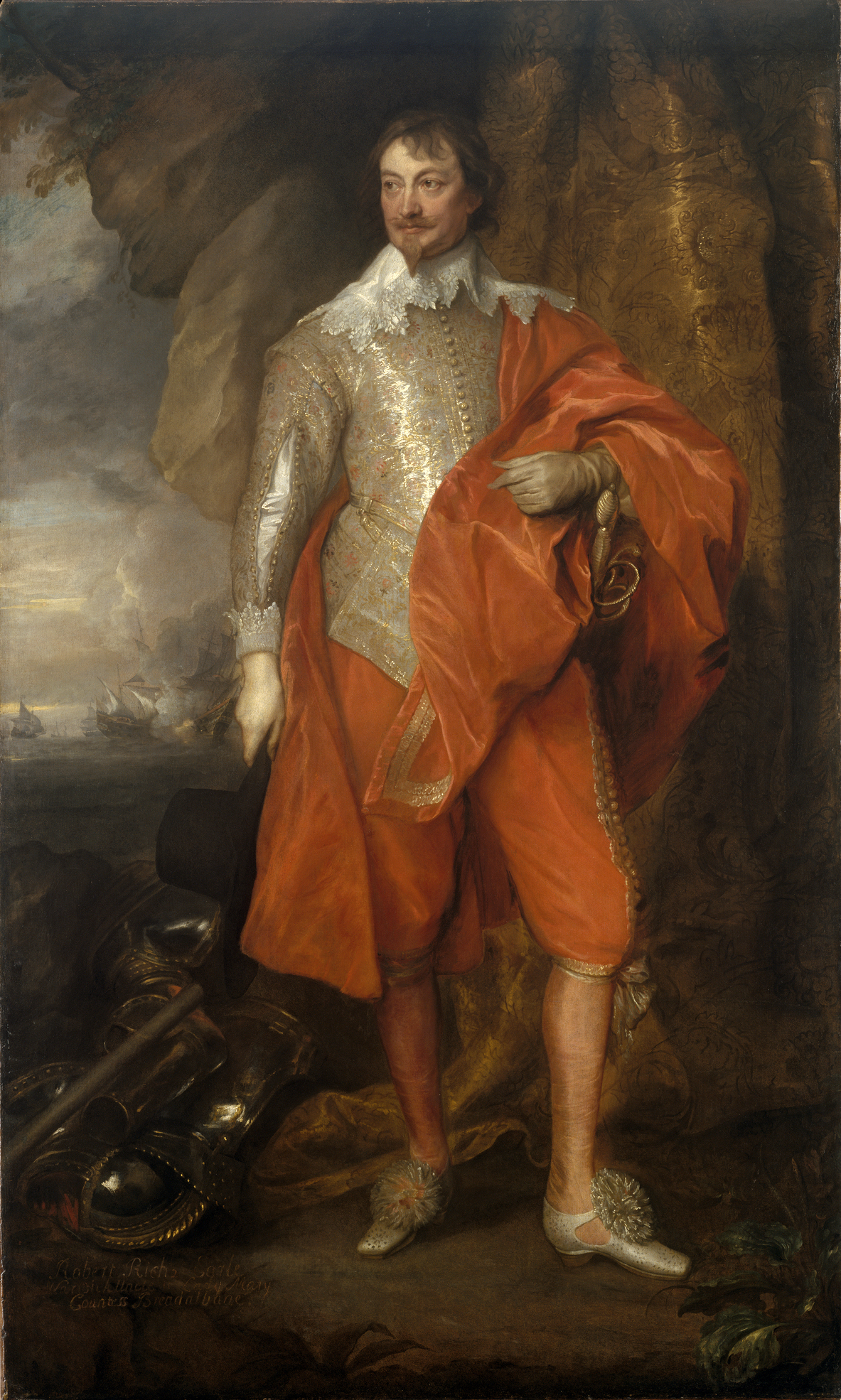
Robert Rich, 2nd Earl of Warwick. His ships found the island, and he invested in the company formed to settle it.

The island was first documented on November 25, 1510 by Lope de Olano, a Basque sailing for Castile-Aragon. It remained unsettled and was known to French and Dutch pirates, but apparently was first visited by English ships in 1628. In that year, the Puritan Robert Rich, 2nd Earl of Warwick, sent three privateer ships to the West Indies. They reached Saint Andrew, to the south of Santa Catalina, and landed thirty men there to plant tobacco for snuff. Sussex Camock, with his barque Somer Islands, remained on Saint Andrew. Daniel Elfrith returned to England aboard the Warwicke, via the Somers Isles (alias Bermuda), to report the discovery. Elfrith told the Governor of Bermuda, his son-in-law Philip Bell, of their findings.

In March 1629, Bell wrote to his cousin Sir Nathaniel Rich in England, announcing the discovery of the two islands. Bell's letter described the island as "lying in the heart of the Indies & the mouth of the Spaniards." Thus it was an excellent base for privateering against the Spanish ships. Bell considered that the island would also provide excellent revenue from tobacco and other crops. The Providence Island Company was then established. Leading members of the company included the Earl of Warwick, his brother Henry Rich, 1st Earl of Holland and their cousin Nathaniel Rich, John Pym, William Fiennes, Lord Saye and Sele, and Robert Greville, Lord Brooke.

Philip Bell sailed to Providence in 1629, taking several Bermudians with him including whites and blacks. In November 1630 the Providence Island Company decided that Captain Daniel Elfrith was to be Governor until he returned, after which Captain Philip Bell would be sole Governor. Each adventurer (shareholder) was to obtain as many men and boys as were willing to serve, and the good ones were to be shipped next January. In February 1631 Captain William Rudyerd was appointed commander of the settlers sailing from England to Providence Island in the Seaflower. About eighty Bermudians moved to Providence in 1631. In April 1632 the Company learned that the Seaflower had arrived. Some became involved in religious disputes, and were sent back to Bermuda. In May 1632 the Company instructed the master of the Charity, who was taking another 150 settlers to Providence, that no passengers were to be brought home from Providence without a licence.

== Colonial life ==
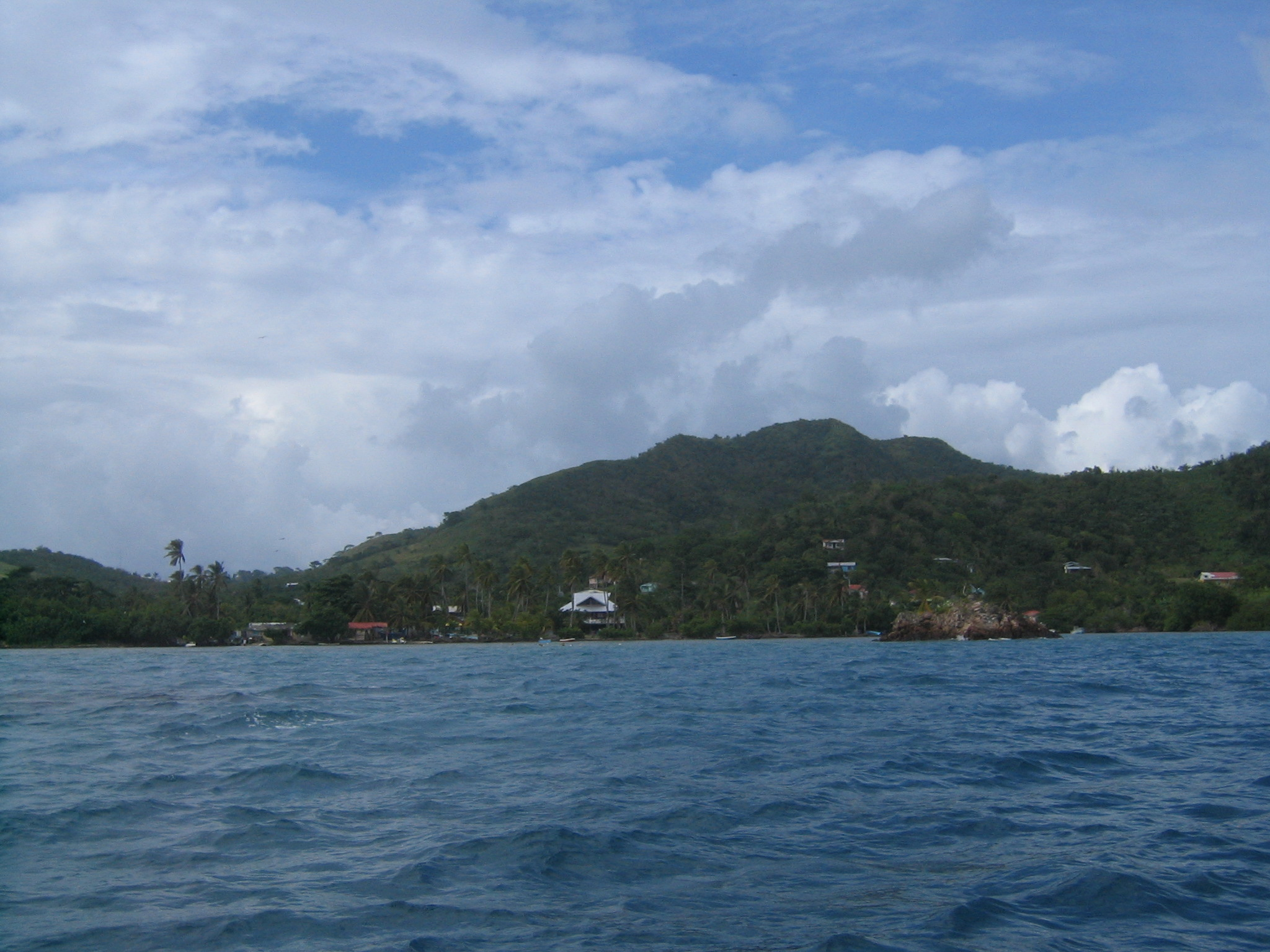
Bahía de Aguamansa, Providencia

Until 1635 the Company discouraged planters from bringing their wives and children. To help preserve order, the Company ordered servants and other single people to live in "families". Governor Bell was instructed to "distribute all the Inhabitants into several families whereof one shalbe the Chiefe." This chief was responsible for ensuring his family did their duty and was to lead them in prayer twice a day. The company forbade swearing, drunkenness or profaning the Sabbath, and ordered Bell to "take care that Idelness as the Nurse of all Vice be carefullie eschewed." Bell was instructed to seize and destroy "cards and Dice and Tables" that had been sent to the island. Apart from his moral duties, the instructions that Bell received from the Company in 1631 included arranging lodgings for the minister, preventing men from planting tobacco but making them plant corn, and if possible sugar cane, building houses, a church and fortifications against possible attack by the Spanish.

An important difference between Providence Island and the Massachusetts Bay colony was that the Massachusetts settlement was led by resident gentry, who allowed the colony to evolve towards self-sufficiency, while Providence Island was ruled by absentee grandees who kept the settlers totally dependent on them. The colonists were only tenants, with half their profits going to the investors in the company. With a limited stake in the colony, the colonists were unimaginative about ways to improve it. There was a glut of tobacco on the market. The Chesapeake, Barbados and St. Kitts colonies were producing far more tobacco and of better quality. The directors tried to encourage the planters to grow other crops such as silk grass, cotton, sugar cane, pomegranates, figs or juniper berries. However, despite a collapse in prices in 1634, the planters still persisted in growing tobacco.

Labour on Providence island was originally undertaken by indentured servants from England, although Bell brought some enslaved Africans from Bermuda. Around 1634–1635 the four-year terms of the indentured servants expired, and planters demanded the right to use black slaves in their place. One colonist, the pastor Samuel Rishworth, spoke out against this practice, saying that Christians should not hold slaves. Bell tried to silence this man on instructions from the Company, so he could not encourage the slaves to seek their freedom from their masters. Specifically, the Company told Bell to, "Condemn Mr. Rishworth's behaviour concerning the negroes who ran away, as indiscreet ("arising, as it seems, from a groundless opinion that Christians may not lawfully keep such persons in a state of servitude, during their strangeness from Christianity") By 1635 there was a population of 500 white men, 40 women, 90 blacks and a few children, scattered across the island. The village of New Westminster had just thirty houses, mostly of timber. Only the church and the governor's house were of brick. Forty guns were distributed between thirteen forts at different points on the island, making no one point particularly strong.

== Internal problems ==
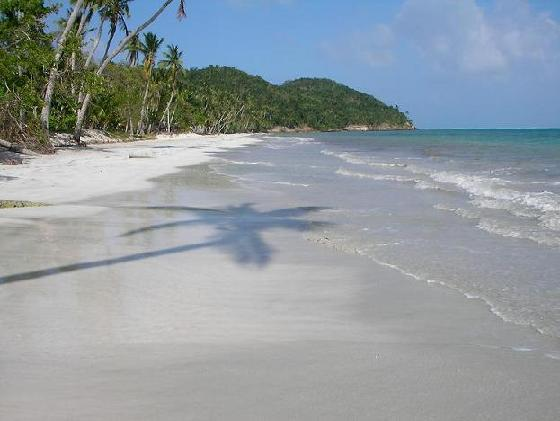
Manzanillo beach on the east side of the island

When the English arrived they found a small group of Dutch privateers living there. Elfrith invited the well-known privateer Diego el Mulato to the island. Samuel Axe, one of the military leaders, also accepted letters of marque from the Dutch authorizing privateering. The settlers were concerned that the presence of these men would draw Spanish retaliation, and also resented having to contribute to building and manning the defences. In 1632 they were near mutiny, led by their chaplain, Lewis Morgan. There were also quarrels over religious practices, with the captains sometimes advocating stricter practices than the settlers were willing to follow. The ministers were often inexperienced, argumentative or otherwise unfit.

Benjamin Rudyerd wrote to Governor Bell in 1633,

Wee well hoped (according to our Intentions) That wee had planted a Relligious Collonye in the Isle of Providence, instead whearof wee fynde the roote of bitterness plentifullye planted amongst you, an industrious supplanting one of another, and not a man theare of Place (a straunge thinge to consider) but hee doth both accuse and is accused; these are uncomfortable fruites of Religion.

At first the island was vulnerable to attack. Samuel Axe and Workmaster Goodman were given responsibility for fortification. Both men became involved in a dispute with Governor Philip Bell and left with Sussex Camock to Cabo Gracias a Dios on the Mosquito Shore to the west. Other men also moved to the Cape. Gun carriages, ropes and powder were spoiled by the rain on Providence Island because the settlers did not have boards to make sheds, and did not have sawyers to make boards. At the start of 1634 the Reverend Hope Sherrard reported that there were far too few men to man the forts or repel a landing force, and only enough ammunition for one day's fight.

On 30 July 1634 the company wrote to Captain Sussex Camock approving of his achievements in opening up trade with the Miskito people, but said there was discontent in Providence, caused by so many men having been taken from it, and that the island needed strengthening. They hoped that Camock could allow Captain Axe to return to Providence to work on the fortifications there. In June 1634 Captain William Rudyerd told the investors in England that the island had no worth other than as a base for privateering, but if properly fortified, the island could be held against any force by 600 men. In December 1634, a Dutch captain told the company that the fortifications were now "handsome, and their ordance fit to prevent the approach of ships."

== Hostilities with the Spanish ==
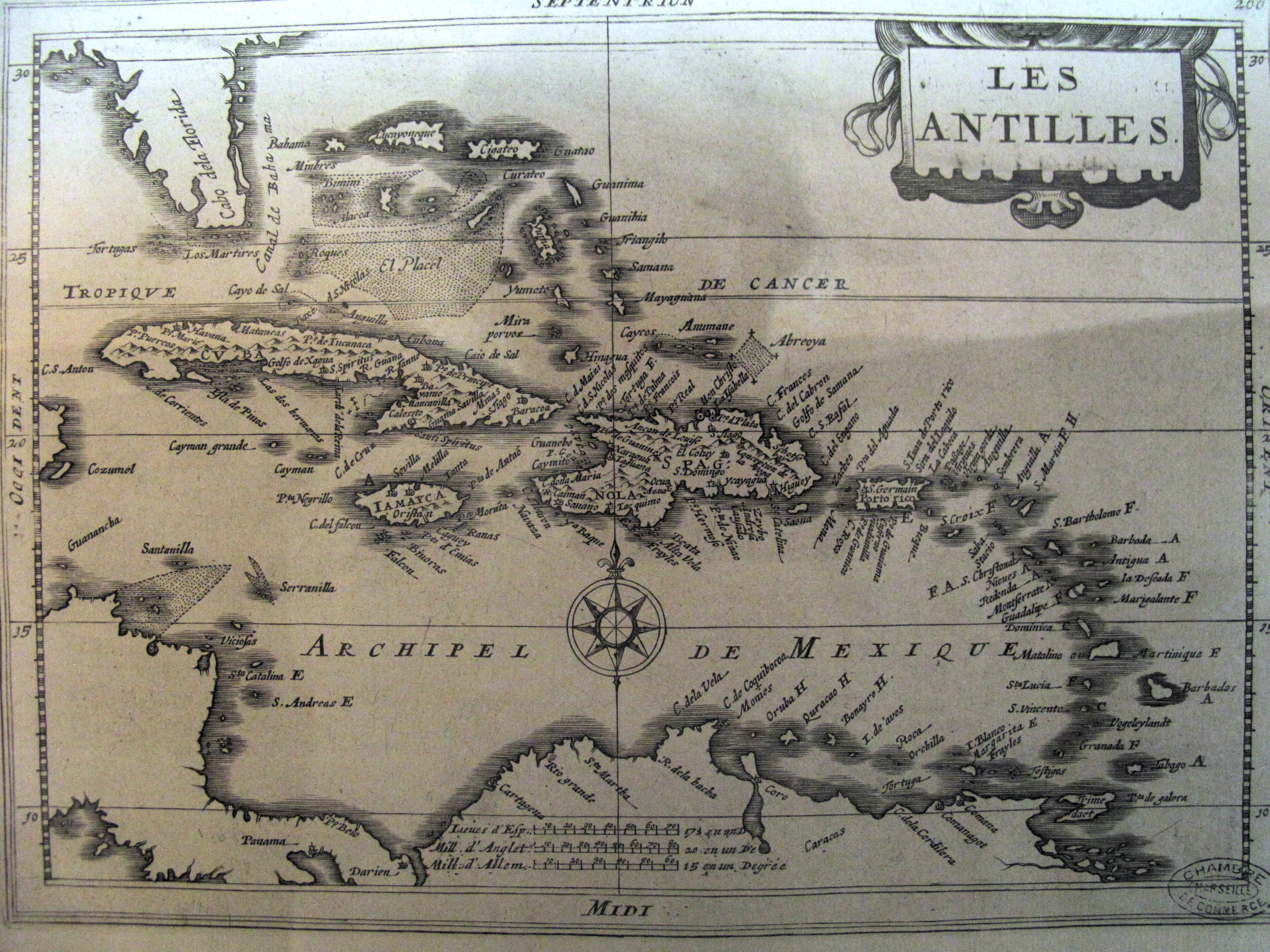
Map of the Caribbean. Sta. Catalina (Providence Island) is in the west, off the coast of what is now Nicaragua, to the north of S. Andreas.

The Spanish did not hear of the Providence Island Colony until 1635 when some enslaved blacks that had escaped from the island were interviewed in Portobelo, on the Isthmus of Panama. Francisco de Murga, Governor and Captain General of Cartagena, dispatched Captain Gregorio de Castellar y Mantilla and engineer Juan de Somovilla Texada to destroy the colony. The Spanish fleet anchored outside New Westminster in July 1635, and Castellar sent a messenger to demand the surrender of Providence island. Governor Bell refused. The Spanish launched an attack at a poorly defended point, but were repelled by gunfire from the heights and were forced to retreat "in haste and disorder". The Spanish took prisoners, who told them of the "Ysla de Mosquito" (presumably the Miskito Keys). Castellar and Somovilla were sent back in October 1635 to search for the Mosquito Island, but they were unable to find it.

After the attack, under pressure from the Company, King Charles I of England issued letters of marque to the Providence Island Company on 21 December 1635. These authorized raids on the Spanish in retaliation for a raid that had destroyed the English colony on Tortuga earlier in 1635. (Note: The island colony of Tortuga had come under the protection of the Providence Island Company. In 1635 a Spanish fleet carrying 250 soldiers led by Rui Fernández de Fuenmayor raided Tortuga. 195 colonists were hanged and 39 prisoners and 30 slaves were captured.) The company could in turn issue letters of marque to subcontracting privateers who used the island as a base, for a fee. This soon became an important source of profit. Thus the Company made an agreement with the merchant Maurice Thompson under which Thompson could use the island as a base in return for 20% of the booty.

In March 1636 the Company dispatched Captain Robert Hunt on the Blessing to assume the governorship. Various changes were made with Hunt's appointment. His passage and that of his wife and three children was paid, and he received one hundred acres of land with twenty servants to work it, but he was paid no salary. Also, the Company refused to pay for the defence of the island. On the other hand, the colonists were encouraged to engage in privateering, paying the Company one fifth of the value of the plunder. (Note: It seems that the Company, although relieved of all expense after 1636, never received their full share of the booty.) According to Thomas Gage, talking of the Spanish treasure fleet sailing between Panama and Havana in 1637,

The greatest fear that I perceived possessed the Spaniards in this voyage, was the Island of Providence ... from whence they feared lest some English ships should come against them with great strength. They cursed the English in it, and called the island, the den of thieves and pirates, wishing the King of Spain would take some course with it; or else that it would prove very prejudicial to the Spaniards, lying near the mouth of the Desaguadero, and so endangering the frigates of Granada, and standing between Portobel and Cartagena, and so threatening the Galeons, and the King's yearly and mighty treasure.

Depredations continued, leading to growing tension between England and Spain, which were still technically at peace. On 11 July 1640 the Spanish Ambassador in London complained again, saying he

understands that there is lately brought in at the Isle of Wight by one, Captain James Reskinner [James Reiskimmer], a ship very richly laden with silver, gold, diamonds, pearls, jewels, and many other precious commodities taken by him in virtue of a commission of the said Earl [of Warwick] from the subjects of his Catholic Majesty ... to the infinite wrong and dishonour of his Catholic Majesty, to find himself thus injured and violated, and his subjects thus spoiled, robbed, impoverished and murdered in the highest time of peace, league and amity with your Majesty.

Nathaniel Butler was the last full governor of Providence Island, replacing Robert Hunt in 1638. Hunt remained on the island. Butler had formerly been Governor of Bermuda, where he had caused extensive fortifications to be erected, and he saw fortifying the island as his main task. Butler had shown he could get on with the Puritans in Bermuda. In Providence Island he was less successful in this aspect of his role, and found it hard to put up with the ministers. Butler returned to England in 1640, satisfied that the fortifications were adequate, deputizing the governorship to Captain Andrew Carter.

In 1640, don Melchor de Aguilera, Governor and Captain-General of Cartagena, resolved to remove the intolerable infestation of pirates on the island. Taking advantage of Portugal wintering in his port, he convinced the Count of Castel-Melhor, João Rodrigues de Vasconcelos e Sousa, to commit himself and his other Portuguese generals and ships to the effort. A force of 1000 was assembled including six hundred armed Portuguese and up to 200 Spaniards from the fleet and the presidio, and two hundred black and mulatto militiamen. They were under the overall leadership of Sousa with the land forces led by don Antonio Maldonado y Tejada, the Sergeant Major, in about a dozen ships including six frigates and a galleon. The troops were landed on the island, and a fierce fight ensued. The Portuguese and Spanish were defeated. Four of the prisoners, including the Portuguese Captain João de Ibarra who was to be the intended new governor, voluntarily surrendered to an English officer on the promise that their lives would be spared. However, Captain Andrew Carter, acting Governor of the colony, ordered all thirteen Portuguese and Spanish prisoners to be put to death after they were interrogated. When a few of the Puritan leaders protested against this brutality, Carter sent the four of them home in chains.

== Capture ==
The Spanish acted decisively to avenge their defeat. General Francisco Díaz Pimienta was given orders by King Philip IV of Spain, Philip III of Portugal, and sailed from Cartagena to Providence with seven large ships, four pinnaces, 1,400 soldiers and 600 seamen, arriving on 17 May 1641. At first Pimienta planned to attack the poorly defended east side, and the English rushed there to improvise defenses. With the winds against him, Pimienta changed plans and made for the main harbor on the west side. He, along with the Portuguese Count of Castel-Melhor Sousa, personally led the assault on the morning of 24 May. He held back his large ships to avoid damage, and used the pinnaces to attack the forts. The Spanish and Portuguese troops quickly gained control while the English retreated to Fort Warwick. Once Captain Carter saw the Spanish flag flying over the governor's house, he began negotiations for surrender.

On 24 May 1641, Pimienta and Sousa formally took possession and celebrated mass in the church. The Spanish and Portuguese took sixty guns, and captured the 350 settlers who remained on the island – others had escaped to the shores of Mosquitia. General Pimienta showed mercy to the English. He did not avenge Andrew Carter's executions of the Spanish and Portuguese prisoners from the previous year. The English prisoners were taken to Cartagena. The women and children were eventually given passage back to England. The Spanish and Portuguese found gold, indigo, cochineal and 600 enslaved blacks on the island, worth a total of 500,000 ducats, some of the accumulated booty from the English raids. Rather than destroy the defenses, as instructed, Pimienta left a small garrison of 150 men (100 Spanish & 50 Portuguese) to hold the island and prevent occupation by the Dutch. Later that year, Captain John Humphrey, who had been chosen to succeed Captain Butler as governor, arrived with a large group of dissatisfied settlers from New England. He found the Spanish and Portuguese in occupation. Pimienta's decision to occupy the island was approved in 1643 and he was made a knight of the Order of Santiago.

== Later years ==
Santa Catalina became an isolated backwater of Spain for the next 25 years. In May 1666 the Dutch privateer Edward Mansvelt, whose fleet included Henry Morgan's ship, took the island, now known to the English as Old Providence. However, the Spanish regained the island in August 1667. In December 1670 Henry Morgan returned to Santa Catalina. The stone built English Fort Warwick was now described as a castle by the Spanish and named Santa Teresa. There were several other forts as well. There were only 190 soldiers, who were overwhelmed by the force of 1,000 buccaneers. Henry Morgan used the island as a base for his raid on Panama in 1670/1671.

== Sources ==
- Bernhard, Virginia (1999). Slaves and Slaveholders in Bermuda, 1616–1782. University of Missouri Press. p. 34. ISBN 978-0-8262-1227-6.
- Breverton, Terry (2005). Admiral Sir Henry Morgan: "king of the Buccaneers". Pelican Publishing. ISBN 978-1-58980-277-3.
- Coldham, Peter Wilson (1987). The Complete Book of Emigrants: 1607–1660. Genealogical Publishing Com. ISBN 978-0-8063-1192-0.
- "Conquista de la Isla de Santa Catalina". Varias relaciones del Perú y Chile: y conquista de la isla de Santa Catalina, 1535 á 1658. Impr. de M. Ginesta. 1879. p. 331.
- Elliott, John H. (2007). Empires of the Atlantic World: Britain and Spain in America 1492–1830. Yale University Press. ISBN 978-0-300-12399-9.
- Fortescue, Sir John William (1860). Calendar of State Papers: 9- ] America and West Indies, 1574. Longman. p. 165.
- Games, Alison (1999). Migration and the Origins of the English Atlantic World. Harvard University Press. p. 27. ISBN 978-0-674-57381-9.
- Games, Alison (2008). The Web of Empire: English Cosmopolitans in an Age of Expansion, 1560–1660. Oxford University Press. ISBN 978-0-19-533554-5.
- Goodman, Jordan (1994). Tobacco in History. Taylor & Francis. ISBN 978-0-415-11669-5.
- Hamshere, Cyril (1972). "Providence". The British in the Caribbean. Harvard University Press. p. 46.
- Kupperman, Karen Ordahl (1993). "A Puritan Colony in the Tropics: Providence Island, 1630–1641". Settlements in the Americas: Cross-Cultural Perspectives. University of Delaware Press. ISBN 978-0-87413-411-7.
- Kupperman, Karen Ordahl (1995). Providence Island, 1630–1641: The Other Puritan Colony. Cambridge University Press. ISBN 978-0-521-55835-8.
- Latimer, Jon (2009). Buccaneers of the Caribbean: How Piracy Forged an Empire. Harvard University Press. p. 84. ISBN 978-0-674-03403-7.
- Offen, Karl (March 2011). "La cartografía colonial de Centroamérica y el topónimo 'mosquito'". Asociación para el Fomento de los Estudios Históricos en Centroamérica.
- "The Geology of Providencia". Caribbean Volcanoes.
- Tomlins, Christopher (2010). Freedom Bound: Law, Labor, and Civic Identity in Colonizing English America, 1580–1865. Cambridge University Press. ISBN 978-0-521-13777-5.
