= Diego el Mulato =

Name of several pirates of the Caribbean

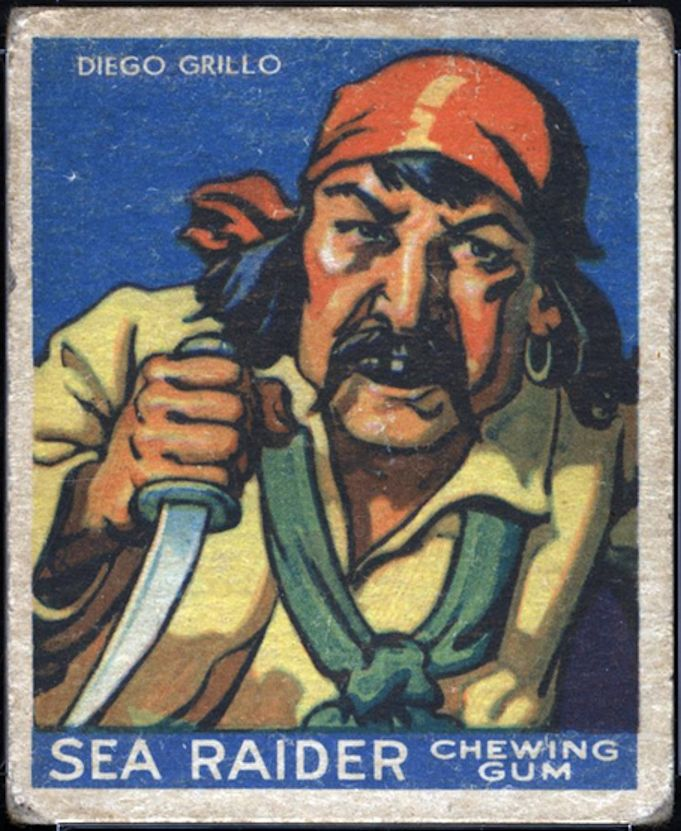
Diego Grillo from the 1933 World Wide Gum Co. "Sea Raiders" trading card series

Diego el Mulato is the name given to several pirates who were active in the Caribbean during the 1600s. According to Irene A. Wright, they were all only one person: “Martin (Diego), alias Diego de la Cruz, Diego de los Reyes, Dieguillo, Diego el Mulato, El Mulato, captain Lucifer or Cornieles, mulatto, first helmsman of the Dutch”.

== Early references ==
A mulatto named Diego Grillo was born in Havana in 1557. He fled Spanish enslavement at Nombre de Dios, Panama in 1572, and was captured by or possibly joined the English privateer Francis Drake in 1572, becoming a member of his crew. He was taken back to England by Drake. He forged an alliance between the English and the local Cimarron.

On 15 May 1584 four privateer ships, two frigates and three pinnaces commanded by William Parker of Plymouth and Jérémie Raymond of Cherbourg intercepted the dispatch vessel of Francisco Rodriguez near Trujillo, Honduras. They learned from it that the nearby port of Puerto Caballos (Puerto Cortés) was vulnerable. A young slave named Diego el Mulato from the Spanish ship offered to help the privateers, and two days later guided a landing party that successfully took the town.

== Martín ==
Diego el Mulato Martín was a former slave from Havana who terrorized the Gulf of Mexico in the 1630s. He escaped from Havana in 1629 and took up the pirate's trade. He was esteemed highly enough by his Dutch companions that within eight years he had become captain of a ship. In the early 1630s Daniel Elfrith invited Diego el Mulato to make his base on Providence Island, home of the puritan Providence Island colony. A force of ten or eleven ships and two sloops under the Dutch pirate Cornelis Jol and Diego el Mulato Martín attacked Campeche on 11 August 1633. The total force was 500 men. When the defenders of the city claimed that they did not have the money to pay the ransom, the pirates burned it down.

Thomas Gage, an English Dominican priest, wrote an account that mentions Diego el mulato. Gage arrived in Mexico in 1625, where he decided to abandon the religious life. He traveled in the region and accumulated wealth. Diego el mulato seized the ship that was carrying him back to England. Gage was unharmed and was allowed to keep some books and paintings, but lost all his other valuables. This robbery occurred in 1637. Gage said of him:

This mulatto, for some wrongs which had been offered unto him from some commanding Spaniards in Havana, ventured himself desperately in a boat out to sea, where were some Holland ships waiting for a prize. With God's help getting unto them, he yielded himself to their mercy, which he esteemed far better than that of his own countrymen, promising to serve them faithfully against his own nation, which had most injuriously and wrongfully abused, yea, and whipped him in Havana...

The Spanish officials in Havana received a letter from Diego Martín in 1638 in which he said he greatly wanted to serve as a "valiant soldier of the king, our lord." He said that he would guard the coasts of Cuba against the Dutch or any other ships, saying, "especially knowing that I am here very few would dare pass on to the Indies, for they certainly fear me." The officials in Havana forwarded the offer to Spain, and recommended a royal pardon and the same salary as an admiral for Martín. Eventually he was given a royal commission so that he would turn his attention to the enemies of Spain.

== De los Reyes ==
Diego de los Reyes, known as Diego el Mulato Lucifer, was a native of Campeche. His father was the Dutch privateer Hendrick Lucifer, Diego's Dutch name was Jacob Hendrickszoon Lucifer. His mother was Ana Luisa de los Reyes from Cuba. In 1642 he sacked Bacalar and Campeche on the Yucatán coast, where he "undressed [altar] images, chopped them to pieces with axes, and dressed up in mockery."

According to Diego López de Cogolludo, in his Historia de Yucatán, the attack on Campeche led to the viceroy of New Spain replacing General Fernando Centeno, governor of Yucatán. Centeno left for Mexico to complain about the decision, but died not far from Campeche. His wife, Doña Isabel de Caraveo, decided to continue on to Mexico. Her ship was captured by Diego's forces, but when he found who she was, Diego gave Doña Isabel an escort back to Campeche.

Some sources identify Diego de los Reyes with the Diego el Mulato described by Thomas Gage.

== Grillo ==
There are relatively few historical records of Diego el mulato Grillo, and they are not all consistent. Most sources agree that he was a mulatto from Havana. He made his base on Tortuga. In an engagement in the Old Bahama Channel he defeated three armed ships that attempted to capture him and killed all the Spaniards in the crew. He was captured and executed in 1673.

== In literature ==
Diego el mulato was the subject of a novel by Justo Sierra O'Reilly, El filibustero, published in 1842. José Antonio Cisneros wrote a verse drama in three acts called Diego el Mulato that premiered on 2 June 1846 in the Teatro San Carlos in Mérida, Yucatán.
