= Robert Hunt (colonial administrator) =

English soldier and colonial administrator

Governor of Providence Island
- In office 1636–1638
- Preceded by: Philip Bell
- Succeeded by: Nathaniel Butler

Personal details
- Profession: Soldier

Robert Hunt was an English soldier who was Governor of the Providence Island colony in the western Caribbean Sea from 1636 to 1638.

== Background ==
The Providence Island colony was an English puritan colony founded in 1629 on what is now called Providencia Island, north of Cartagena and east of Portobelo on the Isthmus of Panama, strategically cited for raids on Spanish shipping. The Spanish attacked the colony unsuccessfully in July 1635. After the attack, King Charles I of England issued letters of marque to the Providence Island Company on 21 December 1635. These authorized raids on the Spanish in retaliation for a raid that had destroyed the English colony on Tortuga earlier in 1635. (Note: The island colony of Tortuga had come under the protection of the Providence Island Company. In 1635 a Spanish fleet carrying 250 soldiers led by Rui Fernández de Feunmayor raided Tortuga. 195 colonists were hung and 39 prisoners and 30 slaves were captured.) The company could in turn issue letters of marque to subcontracting privateers who used the island as a base, for a fee. This soon became an important source of profit. Thus the Company made an agreement with the merchant Maurice Thompson under which Thompson could use the island as a base in return for 20% of the booty.

== Providence Island ==
In March 1636 the Company dispatched Captain Robert Hunt on the Blessing to assume the governorship of what was now viewed as a base for privateering. Hunt was a protege of Robert Greville, 2nd Baron Brooke, and was described as a godly man. He had served with Protestant forces in the Netherlands and at the siege of La Rochelle. His departure was slightly delayed until he could find ministers and men of worth to transport. Captain Hunt was also to be Governor of Cape Gratia de Dios on the Mosquito Coast, where the English were engaged in trading with the Indians for Camock's Flax. This was to be a refuge for the settlers if the Spanish took Providence Island. Given the threat from the Spanish. Hunt was ordered to ensure the settlers were "very regmentlie exercised, especially upon the first comeing to p[er]sons to the Island till they be brought to a p[er]fect knowledge of the use of armes."

Hunt arrived at Providence in May 1636 with three ships, the Blessing, the Expectation and the Hopewell. His passage and that of his wife and three children was paid, and he received one hundred acres of land with twenty servants to work it, but he was paid no salary. Also, the Company refused to pay for the defence of the island. On the other hand, the colonists were encouraged to engage in privateering, paying the Company one fifth of the value of the plunder. (Note: It seems that the Company, although relieved of all expense after 1636, never received their full share of the booty.) Soon after Hunt's arrival, the Blessing and Hopewell were dispatched on a raid against Santa Marta under Captain William Rous. The raid was not successful and the force had to surrender.

Nathaniel Butler, a former Governor of Bermuda, replaced Robert Hunt in 1638. Hunt remained on the island. In July 1638 the company appointed a council of war for the island consisting of Captains Nathaniel Butler, Robert Hunt, Samuel Axe and Andrew Carter, "the King having permitted the Company to right themselves in hostile manner in the West Indies, upon the ships and goods of Spanish subjects".
