= James Reiskimmer =

English Privateer

James Riskinner or Reiskimmer was a 17th-century English privateer who operated from Providence Island against Spanish shipping during the late 1630s. A lieutenant on the ship Warwick, then part of a fleet under the command of Nathaniel Butler, he later took part in a privateering expedition under Butler between May–September 1639.

According to Nathanial Butler's journal, James's father, Captain Nicholas Reiskimmer, was appointed governor of Association Island (Tortuga), but died shortly after arriving there.

During the four-month voyage, Riskinner was elected to succeed its former captain Nicholas Roope who died after leaving Providence Island. However, due both to being unfamiliar with the Caribbean waters and little experience in tracking down Spanish ships, Riskinner and the others were unsuccessful and the expedition returned to Providence Island in September 1639.

However, Riskinner continued searching for Spanish merchant ships and captured four Spanish ships before his return to England the following year with a Spanish prize carrying a large cargo of silver, gold, diamonds, pearls and jewels.
