= Ruy Fernández de Fuenmayor =

Governor of Venezuela Province
- In office 1637–1644
- Preceded by: Francisco Núñez Melián
- Succeeded by: Marcos Gedler Calatayud y Toledo

Personal details
- Born: 1603 Santo Domingo
- Died: 1651 (aged 47–48) Caracas

Ruy Fernández de Fuenmayor (1603 in Santo Domingo – 1651 in Venezuela) was a Spanish soldier who was governor of Venezuela Province between 1637 and 1644.

Fuenmayor was born in 1603, the son of Fernández de Fuenmayor and Juana Figueroa. He served in various positions in Spain, Puerto Rico and Hispaniola. He was General of the galleys in Hispaniola, and in 1635 led an attack on buccaneers who had settled on Tortuga, expelling them from the island for several years. In this raid, he led 250 Spanish soldiers. The Governor of Tortuga, Christopher Wormeley, made his escape. The colonists were less lucky, with 195 being hung, and thirty-nine taken prisoner, along with thirty slaves. Fuenmayor did not leave a garrison, and Tortuga was soon reoccupied by French settlers.

Fuenmayor returned to Spain, and on 26 November 1636 was appointed Governor and Captain-General of Venezuela Province, arriving there in 1637. In 1637 he arranged for transfer of the seat of the bishop of Venezuela from Santa Ana de Coro to Caracas. In 1640 the Benedictine Mauro de Tovar became bishop, and had many conflicts with Fuenmayor.

There was a great earthquake in 1641, and the Caracas council proposed moving the city to the Chacao savanna, a move that Fernandez de Fuenmayor forcibly opposed. He arranged for the fort of La Guaira, which had been destroyed by the earthquake, to be quickly rebuilt. In 1642 Fuenmayor tried unsuccessfully to regain the island of Curaçao, which the Dutch had occupied since 1634. In response, several Dutch pirates attacked Maracaibo and British pirates attacked La Guaira, but were repulsed.

Fuenmayor finished his term in office in 1644, and was succeeded by Marcos Gedler y Calatayud. He remained in Caracas for the remainder of his life. In 1651 he was killed by Fernando García Ribas, Contador of the Royal Treasury.
