= Philip Bell (colonial administrator) =

Governor of Bermuda from 1626 to 1629

Governor of Bermuda
- In office 1626–1629
- Preceded by: Captain Henry Woodhouse
- Succeeded by: Captain Roger Wood

Governor of Providence Island colony
- In office 1629–1636
- Succeeded by: Robert Hunt

Governor of Barbados
- In office 1640–1650
- Preceded by: Sir Henry Huncks
- Succeeded by: Francis Willoughby, 5th Baron Willoughby of Parham

Personal details
- Born: 19 June 1590 Norfolk, England
- Died: 3 March 1678 (aged 87) Norfolk, England

Philip Bell (19 June 1590 – 3 March 1678) was Governor of Bermuda from 1626 to 1629, of the Providence Island colony from 1629 to 1636, and of Barbados from 1640 to 1650 during the English Civil War. During his terms of office in Providence and Barbados, the colonies moved from using indentured English workers to slaves imported from West Africa. The Providence Island colony, despite its puritan ideals, became a haven for privateers attacking ships in the Spanish Main.

== Early years ==
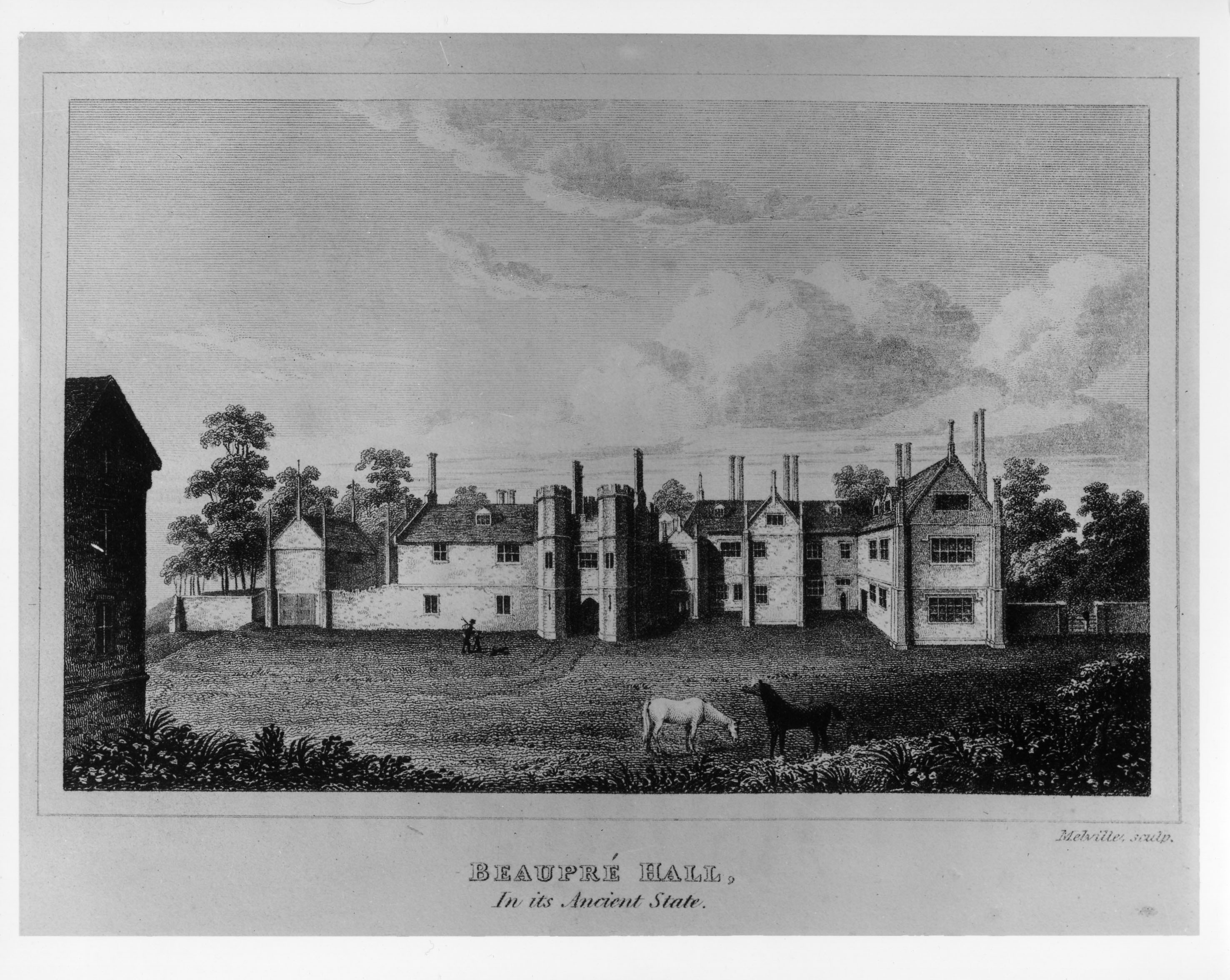
Beaupré Hall, Outwell, Norfolk, family home of the Bell's

Philip Bell came from the family of Sir Robert Bell, a prominent politician under Queen Elizabeth I of England who died in 1577. Karen Ordahl Kupperman, author of a carefully researched book on the Providence Island colony, of which he was the first governor, says he was son of Sir Robert's sixth child, Sir Edmund Bell (1562–1608). (Note: Other sources give different ancestry. One says Philip was the old Sir Robert's son by his third wife (Edmund's brother). This Philip Bell was born on 14 June 1574 in Beaupré Hall in Outwell, Norfolk. Another source says that he was the son of Sir Edmund's son, Sir Robert Bell, and Mary Chester (1590–1656), daughter of Sir Anthony Chester. This Sir Robert Bell was knighted in 1613, elected Member of Parliament for Norfolk on 26 January 1626, and died in October 1639. He married Mary Chester in 1610.) If so, he was born on 19 June 1590, either in South Acre, Norfolk or in Beaupré Hall, Outwell, Norfolk. His mother was Anne Osborne, daughter of Sir Peter Osbourne, the Treasurer's Remembrancer in the Exchequer. Several of his siblings became involved with the Virginia colony.

== Bermuda ==
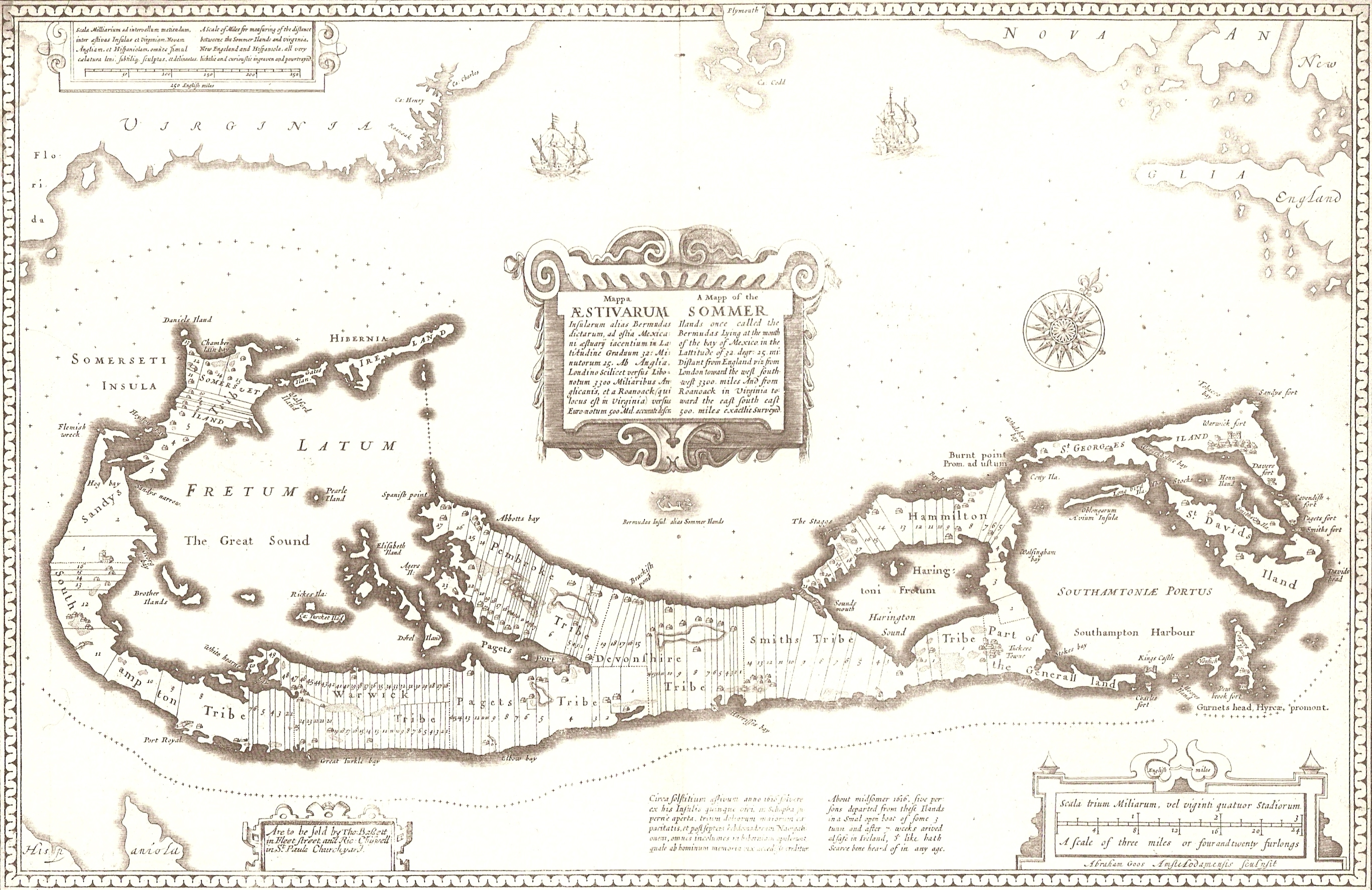
Somers Isles, now called Bermuda

Bermuda, originally called the Somers Isles, is a small group of islands in the mid-Atlantic. The Somers Isles Company owned the islands, and arranged for settlement by Englishmen who planted tobacco. There was very limited available land, the soil was poor and the climate unfavorable. The planters' problems were compounded by squabbles between the Warwick and Sandys factions of the company.

Captain Philip Bell reached Bermuda late in 1626 or early in 1627. Bell belonged to the Warwick faction. He found his predecessor, Captain Henry Woodhouse, facing an attack by the Bermuda assembly for misgovernment. Bell advised Woodhouse to leave as soon as possible, but Woodhouse refused and was censured and fined, then thrown in prison when he refused to apologise. Bell, from a privileged background, resented the high status of merchants on the island. He complained of needing "to live in such a slavishe subjectione to such meane & base minded men as the citizen part of the Companye are & doe showe themselves." As governor, Bell was entitled to 32 servants, of whom 24 were to work the 12 shares of land that were assigned to him. Although some were black, they were not necessarily slaves. In 1629 Bell wrote pessimistically

And as for this island, the strength and work of the land so much decrease and decay that in a short time it will be of very small value or profit, especially as so much tobacco now being planted and being brought home of better quality and from richer climates and plantations, and I make a question whether this will shortly be worth anything at all.

Bell fell out with some of the other settlers in Bermuda. In a letter to Sir Nathaniel Rich dated 28 April 1629, Bell protested about having been blamed for the unrest by the Somers Island Company in England without having been given the opportunity to defend himself. He said the ringleader of the unrest was Stephen Painter, whom he described as a man of "Luciferian Pride", and said the contention arose because Bell would not "suffer the conclusions of the General Assembly and the general equity of the whole land to give place to PAINTER's proud and licentious humour." Bell said that he had resolved to move from the island, and to settle wherever his father in law Daniel Elfreth went. In 1629, Bell left Bermuda and became governor of the Providence Island colony. He was succeeded by Captain Roger Wood, who governed from 1629 to 1637.

== Providence ==
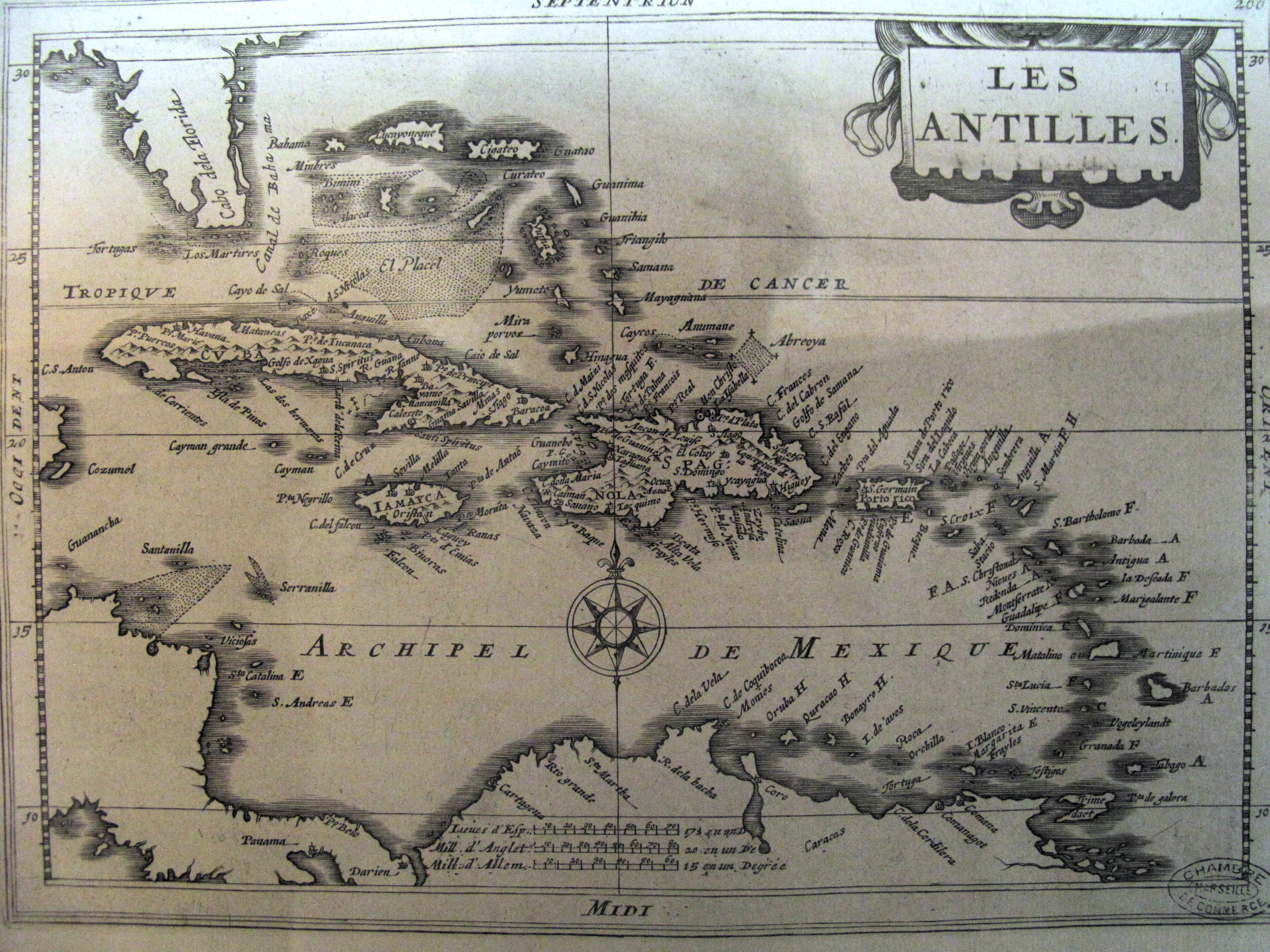
Caribbean sea. Sta. Catalina (Providence Island) is in the west, off the coast of what is now Nicaragua, to the north of S. Andreas

In 1628 two ships funded by the puritan Robert Rich, 2nd Earl of Warwick, explored the western Caribbean and discovered the San Andrés and Santa Catalina islands. Captain Daniel Elfrith, Bell's father-in-law, sailed to Bermuda where he told Bell of their findings. In March 1629, Bell wrote to his cousin Sir Nathaniel Rich announcing the discovery. Bell's letter described Santa Catalina as "lying in the heart of the Indies & the mouth of the Spaniards." Thus it was an excellent base for privateering against the Spanish ships. Bell considered that the island would also provide excellent revenue from tobacco and other crops. Bell's letter led to the formation of the Providence Island Company to organize the settlement.

Bell took several Bermudans with him to Providence in 1629, including whites and blacks. In 1630 the Company decided that Bell would succeed Elfrith as the governor of the colony. At first Bell lived alone on the island, but when he threatened to resign the Providence Island Company arranged to ship out his wife to encourage him to stay. This was an exception. Until 1635 the Company discouraged planters from bringing their families. The company forbade swearing, drunkenness or profaning the Sabbath and warned against the evils of idleness. Bell was instructed to seize and destroy "cards and Dice and Tables" that had been sent to the island. Despite or because of this, there were intense disputes among the occupants of the island throughout the life of the colony.

Although the original plan had been to grow tobacco, there was a glut on the market. The directors tried to encourage the planters to grow crops such as silk grass, cotton, sugar cane, pomegranates, figs or juniper berries. However, despite a collapse in prices in 1634, the planters persisted in growing tobacco. Labor on Providence island was originally undertaken by indentured servants from England, although Bell brought some black slaves from Bermuda. Around 1634–1635 the four-year terms of the indentured servants expired, and planters demanded the right to use slaves in their place. One colonist spoke out against this practice, saying that Christians should not hold slaves. Bell silenced this man on instructions from the company, so he could not stir up the slaves against their masters.

When the English arrived, they found a small group of Dutch privateers living there. Later, Elfrith invited the privateer Diego el Mulato to the island. The settlers were alarmed that the presence of these men would draw Spanish retaliation, and in 1632 they were near mutiny, led by their chaplain, Lewis Morgan. At the same time, they resented having to contribute to building and manning the defenses. The Spanish sent an expedition that reached the island in July 1635, but their attack was ineffectual. After the Spanish attack, King Charles I of England issued letters of marque to the Providence Island Company on 21 December 1635 that authorized raids on the Spanish. In March 1636 the Company dispatched Captain Robert Hunt on the Blessing to assume the governorship of what was now viewed as a base for privateering. Bell was replaced as governor in 1636, and left the island in 1637.

== Barbados ==
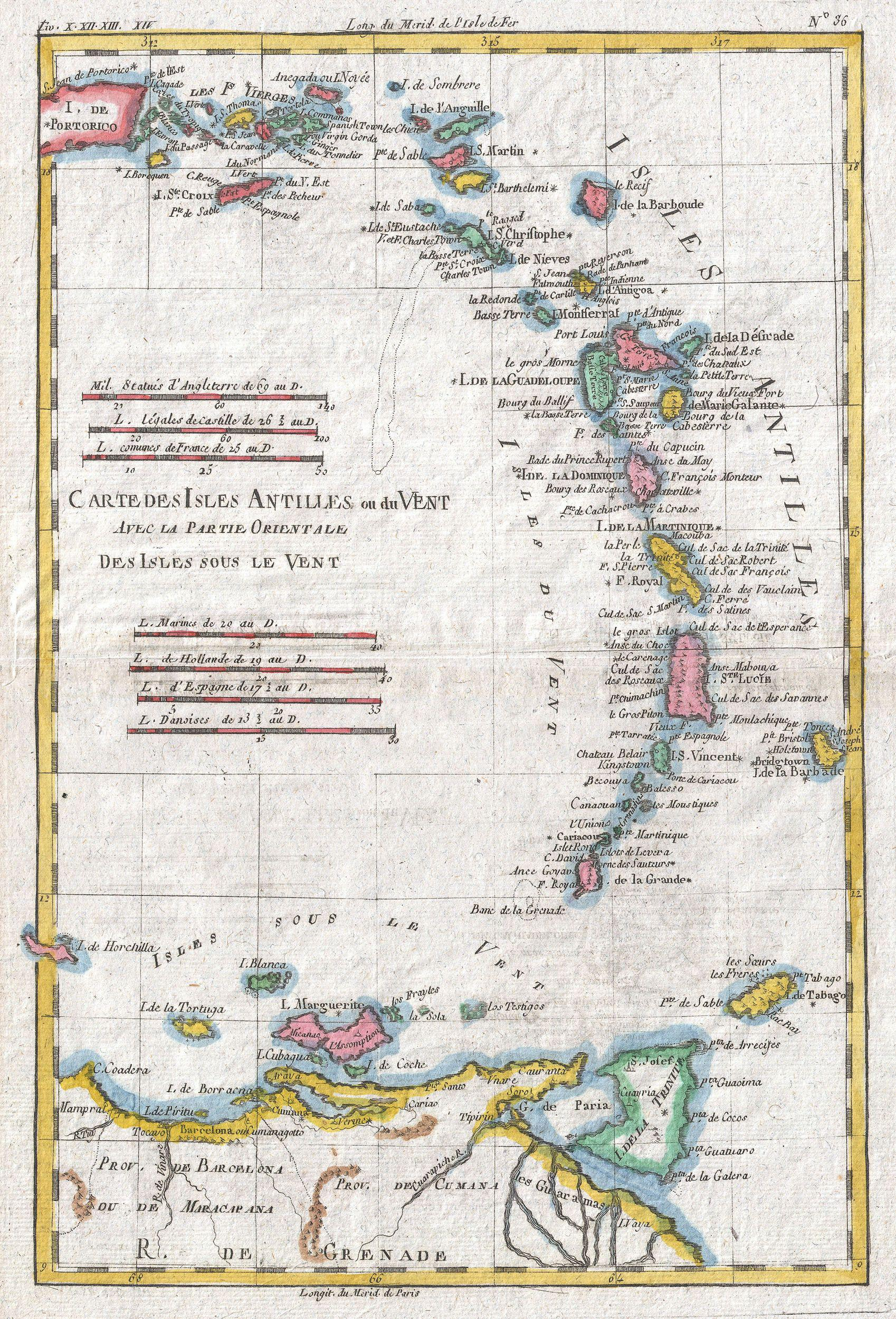
Antilles. Barbados is the farthest island to the east, on the edge of the chart.

In 1640, Bell led a group of settlers to Saint Lucia. By 1641 he was on Barbados as governor. He was appointed by James Hay, 2nd Earl of Carlisle, who owned the island, with the approved of Lord Warwick and the Committee of Trade and Plantations. The island had been settled in 1627 by a group of Englishmen hoping to develop tobacco plantations, but the leaf turned out to be poor quality. They then tried cotton, ginger and indigo, but none of these crops were very successful. In the mid-1640s the settler James Drax tried sugar, struggling at first to master the complex production process. By the end of the 1640s the difficulties had been solved. Prices were extremely high, and the island became "one of the richest spots of earth under the sun". Originally the labor force was provided by poor whites, but the planters found that Africans slaves worked harder, cost less and were better able to tolerate the climate. By 1650 the island had 6,000 black slaves and 24,000 whites.

Bell made a number of administrative reforms. He completed organization of the court system and the parish governments. He made the island's assembly a legal body, consisting of the leading residents, with the power to pass legislation. The land grant act by his predecessor Henry Hawley was confirmed, as were existing property rights, and proprietary dues were abolished. Bell passed an act directed against radical puritans in Barbados, suppressing "certayne sects and separatists." These people, with "erroneous opinions", were ordered to cease meeting in private and attempting to seduce others to their views, but to conform to public Anglican worship.

Barbados remained neutral for most of the English Civil War, which broke out in 1642 after a long period of growing hostility between the king and parliament. Exiles from both sides avoided conflict as they ran their plantations and trading operations. Bell wrote in 1645 that,

it pleased god so to unite all their minds and harts together, that every parish declared themselves resolutely for the maintenance of their peace and present government; and to admit of noe alterationes or new commissiones from either side ... for against the kinge we are resolved never to be, and without the freindeshipe of the perliament and free trade of London ships we are not able to subsist.

As the tide turned in favor of the parliamentarians, increasing numbers of royalist refugees arrived in the island. King Charles I of England was executed in January 1649, and the truce between the two sides on the island began to break down. Philip Bell favored neutrality. He published a declaration on 29 April 1650 saying "... no man should take up Armes, nor act in any hostile manner upon paine of death." On 30 April, the leaders of the Royalist faction persuaded two militia leaders to raise their men. Bell ordered them to disband, but they refused. Bell called on James Drax to raise a force to keep the peace, but he was unable to gather enough men to present a credible challenge to the royalists, who were marching on Bridgetown. Bell was forced to concede control of the arsenal and of his own person to the Cavaliers. The Roundheads were disarmed and punished. A declaration of loyalty to Charles II was published on 3 May 1650.

Francis, Lord Willoughby, arrived at the end of July 1650. Charles II had appointed him as the new Governor of the "Caribbee Isles", and he took over from Bell. Philip Bell died in England in 1678 and was buried at Outwell, Norfolk.
