= Nathaniel Butler =

Governor of Bermuda
- In office 1619–1622
- Preceded by: Daniel Tucker
- Succeeded by: John Bernard

Governor of Providence Island
- In office 1638–1640
- Preceded by: Robert Hunt
- Succeeded by: Andrew Carter (acting)

Personal details
- Born: c. 1577
- Profession: Privateer

Nathaniel Butler (born c. 1577, living 1639, date of death unknown) was an English privateer who later served as the colonial governor of Bermuda during the early 17th century. He had built many structures still seen in Bermuda today including many of the island's coastal fortresses and the State House, in St. George's, the oldest surviving English settlement in the New World (the State House, completed in 1620, was the first purpose-built building to house the Bermudian parliament). He also has the distinction of introducing the potato, the first seen in North America, to the early English colonists of Jamestown, Virginia.

First serving in the service of the Earl of Warwick during his early sailing career, he was later appointed as governor of Bermuda, then administered by the Somers Isles Company (an offshoot of the Virginia Company), a post which he served from 1619 to 1622. During this time, he salvaged guns from a shipwrecked vessel and used them to arm the island forts then under construction including Southampton Fort and those of Smith's and Paget Island in 1620 (the incident would later be recorded by John Smith in 1624). While Governor of Bermuda, he played an indirect role in the development of the Bermuda rig, when he employed a shipwrecked Dutch boatbuilder. He would also be the first to introduce the potato to North America when, in 1621, he had a cargo of potatoes shipped to Governor Francis Wyatt of Jamestown. He was the third governor of Bermuda.

After a brief stay in Jamestown the following year, during which he published a report entitled "Unmasked Face of Our Colony in Virginia as it was in the winter of the Year 1622" later presented to the privy council upon his return to London, Butler was made an Admiral of the Providence Island colony, at the age of 61. He later found employ with the Providence Island Company during 1639 and 1640.

While on a privateering expedition in mid-1639 along the Spanish Main, he successfully captured a Spanish frigate at the harbour of Trujillo, Honduras, and extorted 16,000 pesos from the town's inhabitants. However, the frigate alone was considered a poor prize by the standards of the time and, suffering from inexperienced officers unfamiliar with the region (including future privateer James Riskinner), the expedition followed a very erratic course throughout the Caribbean and failed to capture anything else of value by the time of their return to Providence in September 1639.
