= Providencia Island, Colombia =

One of the two principal islands of San Andrés and Providencia, Colombia

Old Providence Island Isla de Providencia Old Providence
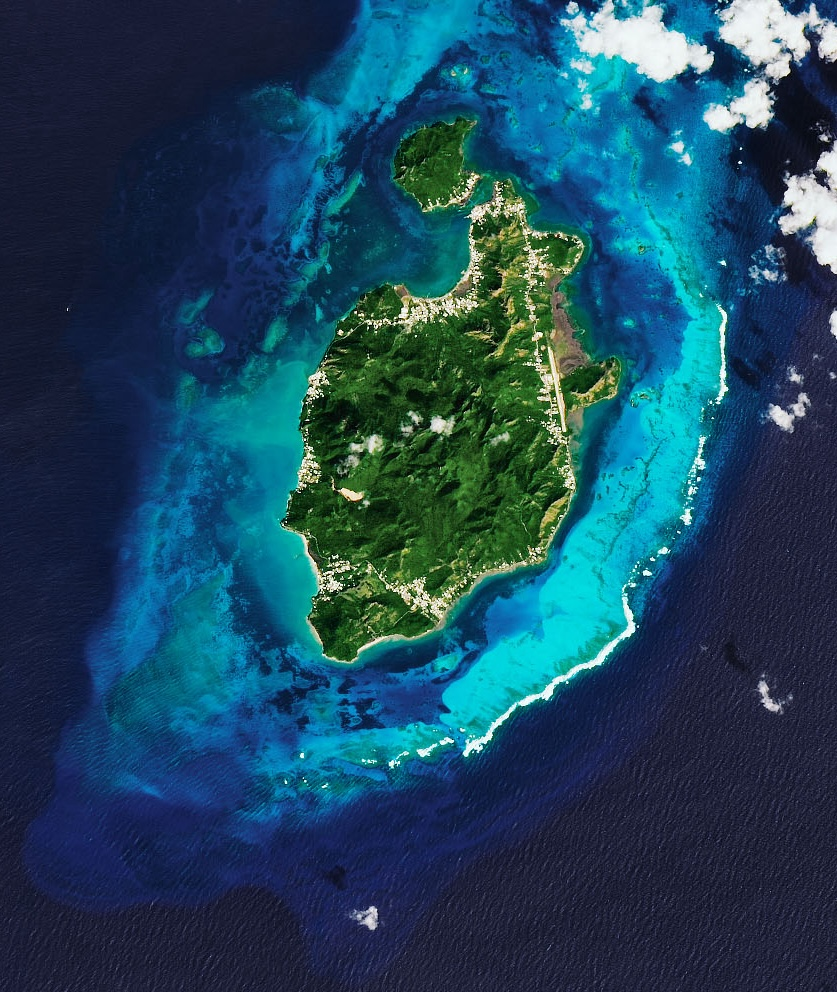
- Satellite view of Providencia

- Seal
- Interactive map of Old Providence Island
- Coordinates: 13°20′56″N 81°22′29″W
- Country: Colombia
- Department: San Andrés, Providencia and Santa Catalina

Area
  - Total: 17.0 km^{2} (6.6 sq mi)
- Elevation: 360 m (1,180 ft)

Population (2007)
  - Total: 5,011
  - Density: 295/km^{2} (763/sq mi)
- Estimate
- Time zone: Colombia Time (COT)
  - Summer (DST): none
- Languages: San Andrés–Providencia Creole, Spanish

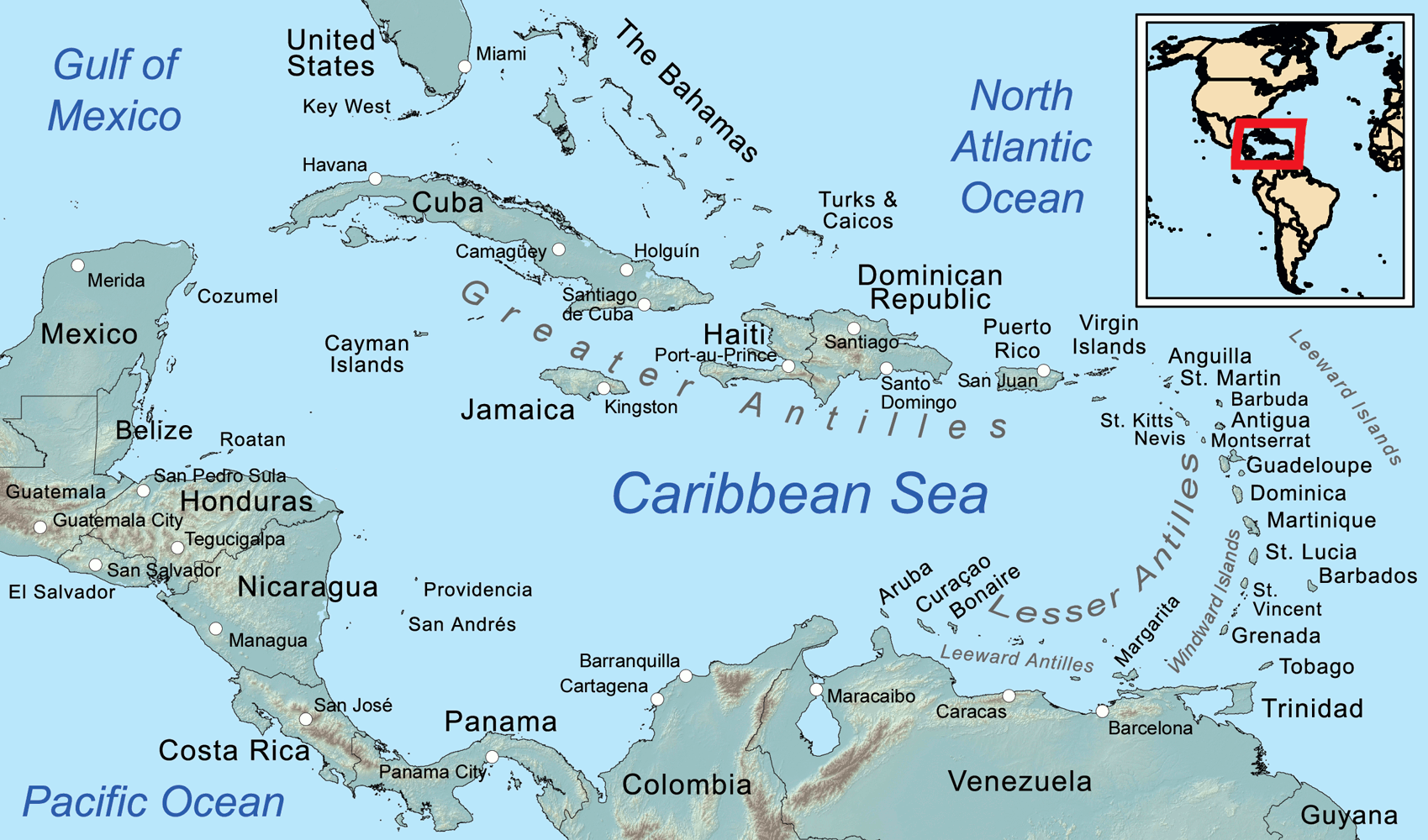
Map of the Caribbean Sea and its islands, with Providencia shown at lower left northeast of San Andrés.

Isla de Providencia, historically Old Providence, and generally known as Providencia or Providence, is a mountainous Caribbean island that is part of the Colombian department of Archipelago of San Andrés, Providencia and Santa Catalina, or The Raizal Islands, and the municipality of Providencia and Santa Catalina Islands, lying midway between Costa Rica and Jamaica.

Providencia's maximum elevation is 360 metres (1,180 ft) above sea level. The smaller Santa Catalina Island to the northwest is connected by a 100-metre (330 ft) footbridge to its larger sister Providencia Island. Providencia Island has an area of 17 square kilometres (6.6 sq mi); the two islands cover an area of 22 square kilometres (8.5 sq mi) and form the municipality of Santa Isabel, which had a population of 4,927 at the Census of 2005. The island is served by El Embrujo Airport, which the Colombian Government plans to expand in order to operate international flights.

The island was the site of an English Puritan colony established in 1629 by the Providence Island Company, and was taken by Spain in 1641. Forts and cannons dating back hundreds of years can be found scattered all over Santa Catalina Island.

In November 2020, Hurricane Iota directly impacted the island. An estimated 98% of all infrastructure was destroyed from the impact, making it one of the worst and strongest tropical cyclones to impact Colombia.

== Early colonial times ==
The colony was hampered by poor planning, internal strife (seen in conflict among leadership) and economic woes. It was founded, in part, to create a profitable and Godly Puritan base. It was expected to be more profitable and successful than the Massachusetts Bay Colony that was founded in 1630. The colony is known for its involvement in the trade of slaves and was the beginning of the English use of Africans as life-long slaves instead of indentured servants.

Some of the more famous residents were the governors Nathaniel Butler and Philip Bell, Bell's father-in-law Daniel Elfrith, and William Rous. Philip Bell was the first governor and was replaced by Robert Hunt, due to conflict with another colonist. Nathaniel Butler later replaced Hunt. Many of these men had already had experience with England's colonizing and economic expeditions with the Virginia Company and the Somers Isles (Bermuda) Company.

It is possible to infer what life was like on the island based on the accounts of slaves. They reported that some of the Englishmen who wanted to leave said "this place is no way to live" as a complaint against eating turtles all the time. Life included church services, trade with English ships, and hopes for corsair raids against the Spanish. Tobacco was grown on the island by the African and Native American slaves. The island's freshwater streams and surrounding waters provided fish and turtles as additional food sources. They sometimes brought back Miskito men from their expeditions to the Mosquito Shore.

The principal trading port had several small forts around the harbor and at the bay's entrance. There were about fourteen forts in all.

=== Privateering ===
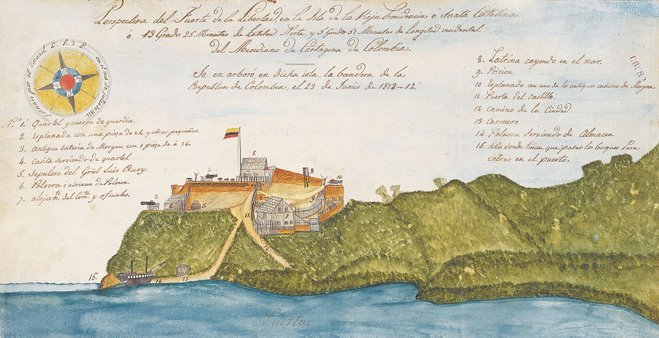
Drawing of the fortress of pirate Louis Michel Aury by Louis Pérou de Lacroix (1821)

Due to the economic difficulties the colonists faced, some turned to privateering to make money. Though England and Spain were not at war, the desire to protect the respective countries' interests in the West Indies only increased tensions between the two nations. While Nathaniel Butler was governor, much of his time was spent looking after the needs of privateers. He was hoping to revitalize the colony's hurting economy, which in turn would improve the morale and hopes of the disgruntled colonists. In addition, he was worried that the English and Dutch activity in a heavily Spanish-controlled area would attract unwanted attention.

The island's focus turned to defense and by 1638 the colony expected a Spanish attack within a year. Several men were sent on privateering expeditions themselves and a council of war was created. This is one major difference between the Providence Island colony and other English colonies; as Karen Kupperman observes, in the New England colonies, "success was accompanied by lodging such issues firmly under civilian control. In the threatening world of the western Caribbean, such amateurism was not seen as possible." However, the privateering expeditions proved unsuccessful due to inexperience and lack of general sailing or West Indies knowledge.

The privateer Henry Morgan used Providencia as a base for raiding Panama, and rumors suggest that much of his treasure remains hidden on the island. Many parts of the island are named after Morgan.

== People ==
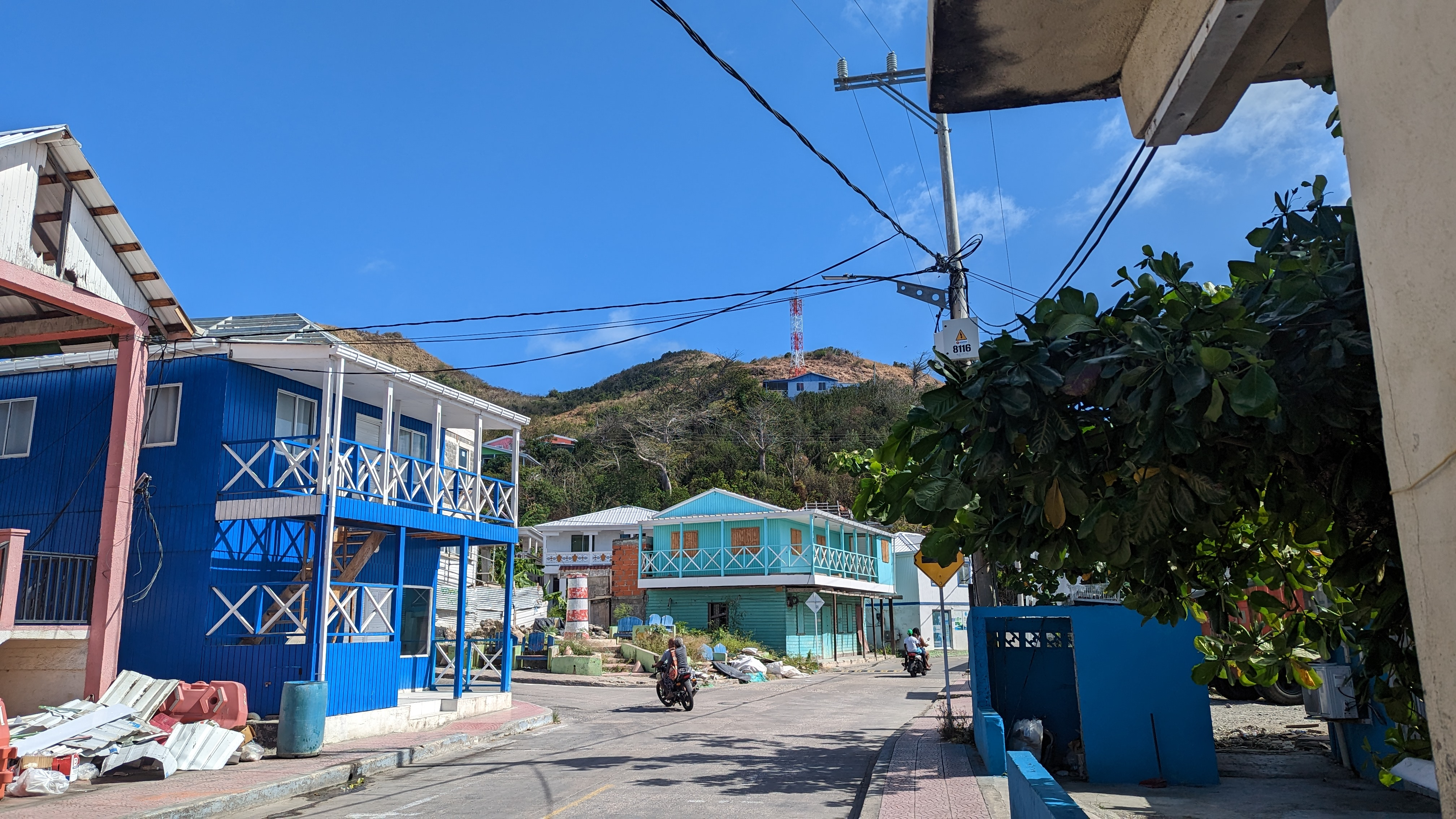
Santa Isabel Providencia

Although the island is part of Colombia, the 5,000 to 6,000 inhabitants are reported to feel more Caribbean than Colombian, with many Rastafari. The inhabitants mostly speak English or San Andrés–Providencia Creole, an English-based creole similar to Belize Kriol, Moskitian Creole, and Jamaican Patwa, rather than the Spanish of Colombia, as well as Provisle, an indigenous sign language. So far, they have tried to preserve their heritage.

As of 2015, the island was not seriously affected by the drug trafficking of Colombia, but many islanders were recruited to work for traffickers due to their seafaring skills and knowledge of the waters of the area and to the scarcity of other employment opportunities on the island. It was estimated that about 800 young men out of the island's small population were in prisons abroad, or had disappeared.

== Environment ==
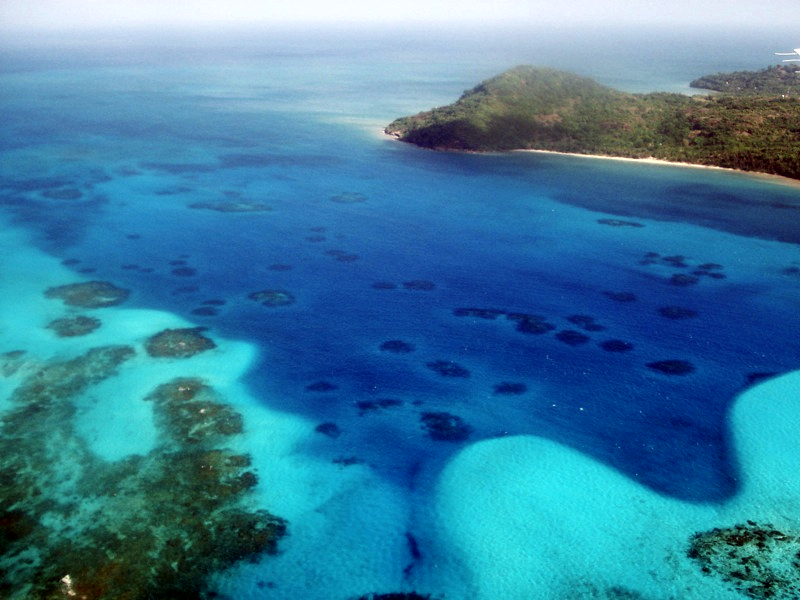
Aerial view towards Manzanillo beach and Old Providence McBean Lagoon on the east coast of Providencia Island

The 995-hectare national park Old Providence McBean Lagoon is located on the island's northeast side, between Maracaibo and Rocky Point. This National Park consists of coral reefs, small cays, mangroves, lagoons and tropical dry forest. The National Park has a visitor centre on Crab cay, from where there are views towards the barrier reef and the surrounding waters.

A local population of black land crabs is noteworthy for its breeding migration, which occurs every April/May. These crabs live in the hills of the island and descend en-masse to the sea once a year to lay their eggs.

Providencia is the centre point of the UNESCO Marine Protected Area the Seaflower Biosphere Reserve, which forms 10% of the entire Caribbean Sea. This ecologically important reserve contains some of the world's greatest marine biodiversity, and incorporates the Archipelago of San Andrés, Providencia and Santa Catalina, in addition to the remote uninhabited cays at Roncador Bank, Serrana Bank, as well as distant reefs that include Quita Sueño Bank, Rosalind Bank and Alice Shoal.

=== Scuba diving ===
Most of the waters are in protected areas of the UNESCO Seaflower Biosphere Reserve and are warm, calm and clear most of the year, making them a popular scuba destination. The area is part of the world's third largest barrier reef.

== Climate ==
Climate data for Providencia Island (El Embrujo Airport), elevation 1 m (3.3 ft), (1981–2010)
Month	Jan	Feb	Mar	Apr	May	Jun	Jul	Aug	Sep	Oct	Nov	Dec	Year
Mean daily maximum °C (°F)	29.2 (84.6)	29.3 (84.7)	29.8 (85.6)	30.5 (86.9)	30.7 (87.3)	30.7 (87.3)	30.6 (87.1)	30.9 (87.6)	31.1 (88.0)	30.6 (87.1)	30.0 (86.0)	29.6 (85.3)	30.3 (86.5)
Daily mean °C (°F)	26.8 (80.2)	26.8 (80.2)	27.0 (80.6)	27.7 (81.9)	28.1 (82.6)	28.4 (83.1)	28.3 (82.9)	28.4 (83.1)	28.1 (82.6)	27.6 (81.7)	27.4 (81.3)	27.1 (80.8)	27.6 (81.7)
Mean daily minimum °C (°F)	24.9 (76.8)	24.8 (76.6)	25.1 (77.2)	25.9 (78.6)	26.3 (79.3)	26.5 (79.7)	26.3 (79.3)	26.3 (79.3)	25.7 (78.3)	25.2 (77.4)	25.3 (77.5)	25.1 (77.2)	25.6 (78.1)
Average precipitation mm (inches)	97.0 (3.82)	45.6 (1.80)	23.0 (0.91)	27.0 (1.06)	137.4 (5.41)	171.1 (6.74)	153.7 (6.05)	174.1 (6.85)	185.6 (7.31)	346.4 (13.64)	284.0 (11.18)	128.3 (5.05)	1,773.3 (69.81)
Average precipitation days	20	14	10	8	14	20	22	21	19	22	23	21	208
Average relative humidity (%)	78	77	76	77	80	81	81	81	82	84	82	80	80
Mean monthly sunshine hours	232.5	231.5	269.7	267.0	235.6	195.0	213.9	235.6	201.0	186.0	177.0	201.5	2,646.3
Mean daily sunshine hours	7.5	8.2	8.7	8.9	7.6	6.5	6.9	7.6	6.7	6.0	5.9	6.5	7.3
Source: Instituto de Hidrologia Meteorologia y Estudios Ambientales
