= Providence Island Company =

English chartered company

The Providence Company or Providence Island Company was an English chartered company founded in 1629 by a group of Puritan investors including Robert Rich, 2nd Earl of Warwick in order to establish the Providence Island colony on Providence Island, nowadays part of San Andrés y Providencia Department of Colombia.

English settlers were sent to the colonies to run plantations. The colonies also functioned as a base for privateers operating against Spanish ships and settlements in the region. Colonists had to pay one fifth of the plunder to the Company. The colonies were destroyed by the Spanish and Portuguese in 1641.

== Background ==
Providence Island was discovered during 1629 by Daniel Elfrith. Elfrith passed its location to Philip Bell who was governor of the Somers Isles, or Somers Islands (Bermuda); Bell mentioned it to Nathaniel Rich. Rich then involved the Earl of Warwick, his cousin, who called a meeting for 10 November 1629, at Brooke House in Holborn, London. The result was finance, notionally £200 per member, with 20 members, that number being achieved at the start of 1631. Bell accompanied settlers to Providence Island, landed on 24 December of the same year, and became the first governor.

== Participants ==
Besides Lord Warwick, among the twenty shareholders in the Company were William Fiennes, Lord Saye and Sele, and Robert Greville, Lord Brooke. Oliver St John, a Puritan barrister, represented the Providence Company's interests, and the treasurer was John Pym, a squire from the West Country. William Jessop was commissioned as the Company's Secretary.

The Company was granted a royal charter. Of these investors, 12 already were involved with the Somers Isles Company. An official record names 7 for the patent granted 4 December 1630, with others to be added in future. The following are listed as Charter Members:

Member	Notes
Gabriel Barber (Barbor)	Barber was treasurer to the Somers Isles Company. A reluctant joiner, his participation was only confirmed on 10 February 1631. Member of the Feoffees for Impropriations; left 1632.
Sir Thomas Barrington, 2nd Baronet	Not in the original Charter Member group of November 1630, he was brought in to make up the numbers to 20 in January 1631.
John Dyke	Dyke had extensive commercial experience, being from a merchant family, of the Fishmongers' Company, and an investor in other colonial ventures. Left 1632; ¼ share was taken by John Upton via Pym.
William Fiennes, 1st Viscount Saye and Sele	Peer.
Gregory Gawsell	Gawsell worked as an estate manager for Warwick. During the First English Civil War he was treasurer for the Eastern Association.
Gilbert Gerard	Member of Parliament, brother-in-law of Sir Thomas Barrington (above)
John Graunt (Grant)	A clerk at Whitehall, and colleague of Pym from the Exchequer.
Robert Greville, 2nd Baron Brooke	Peer.
John Gurdon	Member of Parliament.
Edward Harwood	Died 1632. His brother George Harwood was a member of the Feoffees for Impropriations.
Richard Knightley	Member of Parliament.
Edmond Moundeford	Member of Parliament.
John Pym	Member of Parliament. Pym was influential in bringing in Graunt, Robartes and St John.
Henry Rich, 1st Earl of Holland	Peer.
Nathaniel Rich	Member of Parliament.
Robert Rich, 2nd Earl of Warwick	Peer.
John Robartes	Peer from 1634.
Benjamin Rudyerd	Member of Parliament
Oliver St John	Member of Parliament
Christopher Sherland	Member of Parliament, member of the Feoffees for Impropriations; died 1632. A ½ share was taken by William Ball.

Four of them dropped out early, and other investors bought into the Company.

A decade later, the English Civil War made these names famous. John Hampden was also a prominent figure in the events leading up to the English Civil War. He was not a shareholder personally but was a cousin of one, and he did arbitrate between the shareholders and their agents on the island.

A close kinship group linked several charter members of the Company: Lord Warwick's younger brother Henry, recently made Earl of Holland and a favourite of Queen Henrietta Maria; their half-brother, their mother's natural son, Mountjoy Blount, recently made Earl of Newport and, like Holland, a figure at court; their cousin the Earl of Essex and his brother-in-law the Earl of Hertford.

The first opposition party in English history coalesced around this nucleus and their friends in both Houses of Parliament, formed at the end of the 1630s in resistance to the imposition of Ship Money, and meeting ostensibly for Company business in Gray's Inn Lane or Brook House, Holborn, or in the country.

== Commercial activity ==
At the start, the company had a twofold interest: to establish a God-fearing population in an ideal commonwealth (who were to support themselves with growing tobacco and cotton); and to harry Spanish shipping in the Spanish Main. The Company's regulations for the three islands of Providence, Henrietta, and Association (Tortuga (Haiti)) forbade card-playing and gaming, whoring, drunkenness, and profanity. "A carefully chosen minister— a German Calvinist refugee from the Palatinate— was brought home in disgrace for singing catches on a Sunday," C.V. Wedgwood notes. "The Earl of Warwick and his friends were sincerely trying to create three nests of pirates with the behaviour and morals of a Calvinist theological seminary."

The plantation system required African slaves, which involved the Company in the slave trade, but cotton and tobacco failed to be profitable and were replaced by sugar cane. The islands remained a base for privateering, however, under a tacit agreement from the King, whose foreign policy remained officially neutral with regard to Spain, but who agreed, provided that the Company foot any expenses. Prospects for Providence Island brightened at this, sufficiently for the projectors to capitalise the venture with an additional £100,000 in 1637.

From 1631 to 1635, the Company also planted an English colony on Tortuga (also called Association Island), off the coast of San Domingo.

== Outcome ==
In 1635 the Spanish raided the settlement on Association Island and destroyed it. In March 1638 several members of the Company were prepared to emigrate to Providence Island: the Earl of Warwick, Lords Saye and Brooke Henry Darley, but nothing came of their petition for leave. In May 1641 the Providence Island Colony was conquered by the Spanish and Portuguese commanded by Adm. Don Francisco Díaz Pimienta.

== Political influence ==
The Providence Company provided support to the Parliamentarians in the build-up to the English Civil War.The Company is regarded as an effective if restrained vehicle for political opposition to the personal rule of Charles I.

== Sources ==
- Collins, Arthur (1741). The English Baronetage: Containing a Genealogical and Historical Account of All the English Baronets, Volume I. Thomas Wotton.
- Kupperman, Karen. Providence Island 1630 - 1641: The Other Puritan Colony. Cambridge University Press.
- The Penguin Dictionary of British and Irish History, ed. Juliet Gardiner
- Wedgwood, C.V. (1955). The King's Peace, 1637-1641.
