= Periodisation of the history of Belize =

Coordinates: 17°N 88.7°W

Belize / 2013 map by UNOCHA

The periodisation of the history of Belize is the division of Belizean, Maya, and Mesoamerican history into named blocks of time, spanning the arrival of Palaeoindians to the present time. The pre-Columbian era is most often periodised by Mayanists, who often employ four or five periods to discuss history prior to the arrival of Spaniards. The Columbian era is most often periodised by historians, and less often by Mayanists, who often employ at least four periods to discuss history up to the present time.

== Columbian ==
=== Periods ===
The Columbian era of Belizean history is most often divided into four periods, ie the Spanish, Precolonial, Colonial, and Sovereign, all preceded by a portion of the pre-Columbian Postclassic period extending past 1492. These are most often defined or characterised in terms of distinguishing events occurring between each period, ie events separating one period from another, and less often in terms of distinguishing events, trends, or milestones occurring within each period. Generally, there has been less attention paid to the periodisation of the Columbian era of Belizean history, as opposed to its pre-Columbian era, resulting in broad concordance between the upper and lower bounds employed for each period in scholarly literature.

==== Spanish ====
The Spanish period is most often characterised as the time span prior to the beginning or end of the Tipu rebellion, 6 June 1638 – 31 December 1643, or to the latest Tipu reducción in 1 January – 31 December 1708.

==== Precolonial ====
The Precolonial period is most often characterised as the time span running to the date on which the British settlement in the Bay of Honduras was granted a colonial charter, ie 12 February 1862, or the date on which these letters patent were proclaimed, ie 12 May 1862.

==== Colonial ====
The Colonial period is most often characterised as the time span running to the passage of the Belize Act in UK Parliament, the Constitution Act in the Belizean Parliament, or the date on which said acts came into force, known as the day on which Belize gained sovereignty or independence from the UK, ie 21 September 1981.

==== Sovereign ====
The Sovereign ie Independent period is most often characterised as the time span running to the present.

==== Table ====
Defined upper and lower bounds of Columbian periods of Belizean history as per 20th and 21st century literature. (Note: Gregorian dates provided, unless otherwise noted.)
No	Name	Sub	Span	Date	Date	Event	Notes
1	Postclassic	Early; Late	from latest Mayan monumental inscription to earliest Spanish contact or completion of Spanish conquest	13 January 910	13 January 910	Dedication of Itzimte Stela 6	cf (Note: Itzimte event in Ebert et al. 2015, p. 342, tab. 1 item no. 29, Long Count date 10.4.1.0.0 converted to Gregorian date using GMT correlation with 584283 constant, as per the online FAMSI calculator. Bacalar event in Chamberlain 1948, p. 234 (dated 'sometime during 1544') and Jones 1989, p. 43 (dated 'at the end of 1544').)
1	Postclassic	Early; Late	from latest Mayan monumental inscription to earliest Spanish contact or completion of Spanish conquest	21 October 1492	21 October 1492	Arrival of Columbus	cf
1	Postclassic	Early; Late	from latest Mayan monumental inscription to earliest Spanish contact or completion of Spanish conquest	1 January 1544	31 December 1544	Founding of Bacalar	cf
2	Spanish	Early; Late	to start of Tipu revolt or abandonment of Bacalar or latest reducción	6 June 1638	7 June 1638	Start of Tipu revolt	cf (Note: Bacalar event in Vazquez Barke 2012, pp. 114–115. Reducción event in Jones 1998, pp. 407–408 (dated in or prior to 'early 1708').)
2	Spanish	Early; Late	to start of Tipu revolt or abandonment of Bacalar or latest reducción	30 May 1652	31 December 1652	Abandonment of Bacalar	cf
2	Spanish	Early; Late	to start of Tipu revolt or abandonment of Bacalar or latest reducción	1 January 1708	30 June 1708	Latest Spanish reducción	cf
3	Precolonial	–	to granting of colonial charter or to its proclamation	12 February 1862	12 February 1862	Charter granted	cf (Note: Charter events in Burdon 1935, pp. 246, 248.)
3	Precolonial	–	to granting of colonial charter or to its proclamation	12 May 1862	12 May 1862	Charter proclaimed	cf
4	Colonial	–	to passage of Belize and Constitution Acts or from their enactment	6 June 1981	7 June 1981	Passage of Belize and Constitution Acts	cf (Note: xxx)
4	Colonial	–	to passage of Belize and Constitution Acts or from their enactment	21 September 1981	21 September 1981	Enactment of Belize and Constitution Acts	cf
5	Sovereign	–	to present	–	–	–	–

=== Graph ===
Po
Po
Spanish
Spanish
Precolonial
Precolonial
Colonial
Colonial
So
So
Po
Spanish
Precolonial
Colonial
So
│
1490
│
1540
│
1590
│
1640
│
1690
│
1740
│
1790
│
1840
│
1890
│
1940
│
1990
Upper and lower bounds of Columbian periods of Belizean history

Top rows display maximal and minimal upper and lower bounds of periods and sub-periods
Bottom rows display standardised or traditional upper and lower bounds periods and sub-periods
Key
Po = Postclassic
So = Sovereign

=== Table ===
Upper and lower bounds of Columbian periods of Belizean history as per 20th and 21st century literature. (Note: Column colours match those in graphic timeline above.)
Place	Start	Postclassic	Spanish	Precolonial	Colonial	Sovereign	Notes
Belize	1000	1544	1648	1862	1981	–	cf (Note: Spanish Period dated 1544–1648 or 1544–1708, while Precolonial dated 1660s – 1862 (Graham 2011, pp. 2, 49, fig. 0.1).)
Belize	1000	1544	1708	1862	1981	–	cf (Note: Spanish Period dated 1544–1648 or 1544–1708, while Precolonial dated 1660s – 1862 (Graham 2011, pp. 2, 48, fig. 0.1).)
Belize	1000	1521	1708	–	–	–	cf (Note: Though Classic dated 250–900, but 'divided into two temporal sub-periods' ie Early (250–600) and Late (600–900), except that '[b]ridging the Classic and the Postclassic periods is a span of time known to Mayanists as the Terminal Classic' ie 800–1000, and Postclassic dated 900–1521, with Early (900–1250) and Late (1250–1521) sub-periods (McLellan 2020, pp. 3, 22–24, 28–33).)
Belize	1000	–	–	1862	1981	–	cf
Belize	–	–	1638	1862	1981	–	cf (Note: 'Peter Wallace, a Scottish buccaneer [...] may have begun a settlement at the mouth of the Belize River about 1638,' but later 'British buccaneers and logwood cutters settled on the inhospitable coast in the mid-17th century,' and further '[i]n 1798 the British overcame Spain’s final attempt to remove them by force, and Belize became a colony in all but name' (Britannica 2022, secs. entitled 'Introduction & Quick Facts' and 'History').)
Belize	–	–	1650	1862	1981	–	cf (Note: 'Peter Wallace, a Scottish buccaneer [...] may have begun a settlement at the mouth of the Belize River about 1638,' but later 'British buccaneers and logwood cutters settled on the inhospitable coast in the mid-17th century,' and further '[i]n 1798 the British overcame Spain’s final attempt to remove them by force, and Belize became a colony in all but name' (Britannica 2022, secs. entitled 'Introduction & Quick Facts' and 'History').)
Orange Walk	1000	1544	1700	1862	1981	–	cf (Note: Postclassic dated to 1530, but Spanish Period dated 1544 – 1700, and further split into two unnamed sub-periods dated 1544–1641 and 1641–1700, respectively (Rushton 2014, pp. 18, 44).)

== Pre-Columbian ==
=== Periods ===
Pre-Columbian Belizean, Maya, and Mesoamerican history is most often divided into five periods, ie the Palaeoindian, Archaic, Preclassic, Classic, and Postclassic. These are most often defined or characterised in terms of distinguishing events or trends occurring within each period, rather than events occurring between each period (ie events separating one period from another). As a result, though the aforementioned sequence is well-established, and despite each period's characterisation being broadly agreed upon, various discordant upper and lower bounds have been employed for each period in scholarly literature, resulting in temporal overlaps and gaps between chronologies. Additionally, the events or trends used to characterise these periods are now known to have occurred at different times in different geographic regions, sub-regions, and settlements, rather than all-at-once across the Maya Region or Mesoamerica. This further adds to the discordance between chronologies employed in scholarly literature, as increasingly localised upper and lower bounds for sub-regional geographic entities are used (in preference to fixed or standardised regional start and end dates). (Note: 'Thus, [...] we should always think of [these] chronological boundaries not as fixed dates but as approximations of transitions that actually extended over many decades or even centuries (and varied from region to region)' (Sharer & Traxler 2006, p. 156).)

==== Preceramic ====
The Preceramic period is most often characterised as the time span prior to the first appearance of ceramics in the relevant geographic region.

===== Palaeoindian =====
The Palaeoindian ie Lithic period is most often characterised as the time span during which humans first peopled the Americas. Its start is, furthermore, commonly dated to modern humans' first arrival in the relevant geographic region.

===== Archaic =====
The Archaic period is most often characterised as the time span during which non-nomadic farming settlements first appeared in the relevant geographic region.

==== Preclassic ====
The Preclassic ie Formative period is most often characterised as the timespan during which socioeconomically complex societies or states first appeared across the relevant geographic region. It was prior thought of as the period which preceded the Classic culmination or florescence of Maya civilisation, ie 'as a precursor to civilisation, but without the attributes of civilisation in its own right.'

==== Classic ====
The Classic period is most often characterised as the time span during which the social, economic, political, artistic, and intellectual development of societies or states across the relevant geographic region first peaked or culminated.

==== Postclassic ====
The Postclassic is most often characterised as the time span during which societies or states across the relevant geographic region underwent transformation or revival. It was prior thought of as the period which followed the Classic culmination or florescence of Maya civilisation, ie 'as a decline from the Classic peak of civilisation, a time marked by decadence rather than [a Classic-like] era of continued development.'

Though the entire Palaeoindian-to-Postclassic time span is often characterised as pre-Columbian, the Postclassic is most often end dated after 1492.

==== Table ====
Defining upper and lower bounds of pre-Columbian periods in 21st century literature.
No	Name	Sub	Span	Date	Date	Event	Notes
1	Preceramic	Palaeoindian; Archaic	from earliest arrival of modern humans to earliest use or production of ceramics	11785 cal BC	11410 cal BC	Death of Naharon I	cf (Note: Naharon I event in Wrobel, Hoggarth & Marshall 2021, p. 478, tab. 1. Toledoan ie Mayahak Cab Pek event in Kennett et al. 2020, tab. in supp. 1, individual AMS Lab ID PSUAMS-4290. Cunil ie Cahal Pech event in Ebert, Pierce & Awe 2019, supp. p. 6, item Lab # Beta-253771.)
1	Preceramic	Palaeoindian; Archaic	from earliest arrival of modern humans to earliest use or production of ceramics	6660 cal BC	6570 cal BC	Death of unnamed Toledoan	cf
1	Preceramic	Palaeoindian; Archaic	from earliest arrival of modern humans to earliest use or production of ceramics	1375 cal BC	1050 cal BC	Production of unnamed Cunil ceramic	cf
2	Preclassic	Early; Middle; Late; Terminal	to earliest monumental inscription	300 cal BC	200 cal BC	Inscription of Mayan hieroglyphs in Las Pinturas	cf (Note: Las Pinturas ie San Bartolo [Guatemala] event in Saturno, Stuart & Beltran 2006 and Stuart et al. 2022.)
3	Classic	Early; Late; Terminal	to latest monumental inscription	13 January 910	13 January 910	Dedication of Itzimte Stela 6	cf (Note: Itzimte event in Ebert et al. 2015, p. 342, tab. 1 item no. 29, Long Count date 10.4.1.0.0 converted to Gregorian date using GMT correlation with 584283 constant.)
4	Postclassic	Early; Late	to earliest Spanish contact or completion of Spanish conquest	21 October 1492	21 October 1492	Arrival of Columbus
4	Postclassic	Early; Late	to earliest Spanish contact or completion of Spanish conquest	1 March 1544	31 March 1544	Founding of Bacalar

=== Graph ===
Pa
Pa
Archaic
Archaic
E
E
M
M
L
L
T
T
E
E
L
L
T
T
E
E
L
L
Pa
Archaic
E
M
L
T
E
L
T
E
L
Preceramic
Preclassic
Classic
Po
│
8500 BC
│
6500 BC
│
4500 BC
│
2500 BC
│
500 BC
│
1500 AD
Upper and lower bounds of Pre-Columbian periods of Belizean history

Top rows display maximal and minimal upper and lower bounds of periods and sub-periods
Bottom rows display standardised or traditional upper and lower bounds periods and sub-periods
Key
Pa = Palaeoindian
Po = Postclassic
E = Early
M = Middle
L = Late
T = Terminal

=== Table ===
Upper and lower bounds of pre-Columbian periods of Belizean, Maya, or Mesoamerican history as per 21st century literature. (Note: Column colours match those in graphic timeline above. Headers used – Pa Palaeoindian / Ar Archaic / E Early / M Middle / L Late / T Terminal / Po Postclassic.)
Place	Start	Preceramic		Preclassic				Classic			Po		Notes
Place	Start	Pa	Ar	E	M	L	T	E	L	T	E	L	Notes
Maya	-12000	-8000	-2000	-1000	-400	100	250	600	800	900	–	1500	cf
Maya	-12000	-8000	-2000	-1000	-400	100	250	600	800	1100	–	1500	cf
Mesoamerica	-35000	-7000	-2000	–	–	–	–	–	–	–	–	–	cf
Mesoamerica	-35000	-9000	-2000	–	–	–	–	–	–	–	–	–	cf
Lowlands	–	–	–	–	-400	–	250	600	800	900	–	1500	cf (Note: End dated 'to the Spanish Conquest in the sixteenth century' (Adams & Macleod 2000a, p. 206).)
Mesoamerica	–	–	–	-900	-300	1	150	600	790	900	–	–	cf
Mesoamerica	–	–	–	-900	-300	1	250	600	790	900	–	–	cf
Toledo	-13500	-8000	-1500	-900	–	–	250	–	–	–	–	–	cf
Cayo	–	–	–	-1200	-300	1	150	600	800	900	1200	1500	cf
Cayo	–	–	–	-1200	-300	1	300	600	800	900	1200	1500	cf
Mesoamerica	-33050	-7000	-2000	–	–	–	–	–	–	–	–	–	cf
Mesoamerica	-33050	-9000	-2000	–	–	–	–	–	–	–	–	–	cf
Lowlands	–	–	–	–	–	–	250	–	–	900	–	–	cf
Mesoamerica	–	–	–	–	–	–	300	–	–	900	1200	1521	cf (Note: 'Middle Postclassic' dated 1200–1430, with Late Postclassic dated 1430–1521 (Pearsall 2008, p. 210).)
Cayo	–	–	-1200	-900	-300	–	300	600	800	900	–	–	cf (Note: No Terminal Preclassic Period, or said period subsumed into Middle or Late Preclassic (Awe et al. 2021, p. 524, fig. 2).)
Belize	–	–	-1500	-900	-400	-100	250	600	800	1000	1200	1544	cf (Note: Expands Early Classic into 'Early Classic' dated 250–450, and 'Late Classic' dated 450–600, and further expands Late Postclassic into 'Middle Postclassic' dated 1200–1350 or 1250–1350, 'Late Postclassic' dated 1350–1450 or 1350–1492, and 'Terminal Postclassic' dated 1450–1544 or 1492–1544 (Graham 2011, p. 2, fig. 0.1).)
Belize	–	–	-1500	-900	-400	-100	250	600	800	1000	1250	1544	cf (Note: Expands Early Classic into 'Early Classic' dated 250–450, and 'Late Classic' dated 450–600, and further expands Late Postclassic into 'Middle Postclassic' dated 1200–1350 or 1250–1350, 'Late Postclassic' dated 1350–1450 or 1350–1492, and 'Terminal Postclassic' dated 1450–1544 or 1492–1544 (Graham 2011, p. 2, fig. 0.1).)
Belize	-11500	-8000	-900	–	–	–	–	–	–	–	–	–	cf (Note: Archaic Period dated to 900 BC, but Preclassic Period dated from 1200 BC, as 'the 900 B.C. date for the end of a "preceramic" Late Archaic may be too recent for some sites' (Stemp et al. 2021, pp. 417–419).)
Belize	-11500	-8000	-1200	-1000	-400	–	–	–	–	–	–	–	cf (Note: Archaic Period dated to 900 BC, but Preclassic Period dated from 1200 BC, as 'the 900 B.C. date for the end of a "preceramic" Late Archaic may be too recent for some sites' (Stemp et al. 2021, pp. 417–419).)
Mesoamerica	-10000	-8000	-1500	–	–	–	300	–	–	900	–	1520	cf
Mesoamerica	–	–	-2000	-900	-600	1	250	600	–	900	1200	1521	cf (Note: Preclassic expanded to six sub-periods ie Initial (2000 BC – 1200 BC), Early (1200 BC – 900 BC), Middle (900 BC – 600 BC), Middle-to-Late (ca. 600 BC – 300 BC), Late (300 BC – 1 AD), Terminal (1–250), and Classic-cum-Postclassic sub-periods given as Early (250–600), Late (600–900), Epiclassic-and-Early (750–1200), Middle (1200-1400), Late (1400–1521) .)
Maya	-12000	-7000	-2000	-1000	-400	–	250	600	900	1000	1250	1521	cf (Note: Periods given as Palaeoindian (12000 BC – 7000 BC in section title, but later the period's end is dated to 8000 BC in text), Archaic (7000 BC – 2000 BC), Preclassic (2000 BC – 250 AD, but containing only three sub-periods ie Early [2000 BC – 1000 BC], Middle [1000 – 400 BC], Late [400 BC – 300 AD], with this last sub-period post-dating the containing period's end-date), Classic (250–900, but 'divided into two temporal sub-periods' ie Early [250–600] and Late [600–900], though '[b]ridging the Classic and the Postclassic periods is a span of time known to Mayanists as the Terminal Classic' ie 800–1000), and Postclassic (900–1521, with Early [900–1250] and Late [1250–1521] sub-periods) (McLellan 2020, pp. 3, 22–24, 28–36).)
Maya	-12000	-8000	-2000	-1000	-400	–	300	600	900	1000	1250	1521	cf (Note: Periods given as Palaeoindian (12000 BC – 7000 BC in section title, but later the period's end is dated to 8000 BC in text), Archaic (7000 BC – 2000 BC), Preclassic (2000 BC – 250 AD, but containing only three sub-periods ie Early [2000 BC – 1000 BC], Middle [1000 – 400 BC], Late [400 BC – 300 AD], with this last sub-period post-dating the containing period's end-date), Classic (250–900, but 'divided into two temporal sub-periods' ie Early [250–600] and Late [600–900], though '[b]ridging the Classic and the Postclassic periods is a span of time known to Mayanists as the Terminal Classic' ie 800–1000), and Postclassic (900–1521, with Early [900–1250] and Late [1250–1521] sub-periods) (McLellan 2020, pp. 3, 22–24, 28–36).)
Belize	–	-7000	-2500	-1000	-400	–	250	600	800	900	1250	1530	cf

== See also ==
- Periodisation of Mesoamerican history

== Notes and references ==
=== References ===
1. Adams, Richard E. W.; Macleod, Murdo J., eds. (2000a). Mesoamerica, Part 1. The Cambridge history of the native peoples of the Americas. Vol. 2. Cambridge: Cambridge University Press. doi:10.1017/CHOL9780521351652. ISBN 9781139053778. S2CID 163512332.
2. Adams, Richard E. W.; Macleod, Murdo J., eds. (2000b). Mesoamerica, Part 2. The Cambridge history of the native peoples of the Americas. Vol. 2. Cambridge: Cambridge University Press. doi:10.1017/CHOL9780521652049. ISBN 9781139053464.
3. AM (2022). "Columbus' Fourth Voyage". Age of Exploration. London: Adam Matthew.
4. Awe, Jaime J.; Ebert, Claire E.; Stemp, W. James; Brown, M. Kathryn; Sullivan, Lauren A.; Garber, James F. (2021). "Lowland Maya Genesis: The Late Archaic to Late Early Formative Transition in the Upper Belize River Valley". Ancient Mesoamerica. 32 (3): 519–544. doi:10.1017/S0956536121000420. S2CID 245125325.
5. Braswell, Geoffrey E., ed. (2022). 3,000 Years of War and Peace in the Maya Lowlands : Identity, Politics, and Violence. London: Routledge. doi:10.4324/9781351268004. ISBN 9781351268004. S2CID 246542762.
6. Britannica (2022). "Belize". Britannica. London: Encyclopædia Britannica.
7. Burdon, John Alder, ed. (1935). From 1841-1884. Archives of British Honduras. Vol. 3. London: Sifton, Praed & Co. OCLC 3046003.
8. Cagnato, Clarissa (2021). "Gathering and Sowing Across the Central Maya Lowlands: A Review of Plant Use by Preceramic Peoples to the Early to Middle Preclassic Maya". Ancient Mesoamerica. 32 (3): 486–501. doi:10.1017/S0956536121000225. S2CID 245125329.
9. Chamberlain, Robert Stoner (1948). The conquest and colonization of Yucatan, 1517–1550. Carnegie Institution of Washington Publication. Vol. 582. Washington, D.C.: Carnegie Institution of Washington. hdl:2027/txu.059173008409431. OCLC 1843427.
10. CIA (2022). "Belize". World Factbook. Washington, D.C.: Central Intelligence Agency. Archived from the original on 9 January 2021.
11. Ebert, Claire E.; Pierce, Daniel E.; Awe, Jaime J. (2019). "Preclassic ceramic economy in Belize: neutron activation analysis at Cahal Pech". Antiquity. 93 (371): 1266–1283. doi:10.15184/aqy.2019.93. S2CID 199269375.
12. Ebert, Claire E.; Prufer, Keith M.; Macri, Martha J.; Winterhalder, Bruce; Kennett, Douglas J. (2015). "Terminal Long Count Dates and the Disintegration of Classic Period Maya Polities". Ancient Mesoamerica. 25 (2): 337–356. doi:10.1017/S0956536114000248. S2CID 162029501.
13. Gerhard, Peter (1979). The Southeast Frontier of New Spain. Princeton, New Jers.: Princeton University Press. hdl:2027/uc1.b4906135. OCLC 4529742.
14. Graham, Elizabeth (2011). Maya Christians and Their Churches in Sixteenth-Century Belize. Gainesville, Flo.: University Press of Florida. ISBN 9780813040721. OCLC 751694131.
15. Jones, Grant D. (1989). Maya resistance to Spanish rule: time and history on a colonial frontier. Albuquerque, New Mex.: University of New Mexico Press. ISBN 082631161X. OCLC 20012099.
16. Jones, Grant D. (1998). Conquest of the Last Maya Kingdom. Stanford, Calif.: Stanford University Press. hdl:2027/heb.03515. OCLC 38747674.
17. Kennett, Douglas J.; Prufer, Keith M.; Culleton, Brendan J.; George, Richard J.; Robinson, Mark; Trask, Willa R.; Buckley, Gina M.; Moes, Emily; Kate, Emily J.; Harper, Thomas K.; O'Donnell, Lexi; Ray, Erin E.; Hill, Ethan C.; Alsgaard, Asia; Merriman, Christopher; Meredith, Clayton; Edgar, Heather J. H.; Awe, Jaime J.; Gutierrez, Said M. (2020). "Early isotopic evidence for maize as a staple grain in the Americas". Science Advances. 6 (23): 1–11 of article no. eaba3245. doi:10.1126/sciadv.aba3245. PMC 7269666. PMID 32537504.
18. Lohse, Jon C.; Borejsza, Aleksander; Joyce, Arthur A., eds. (2021). Preceramic Mesoamerica. London: Routledge. doi:10.4324/9780429054679. ISBN 9780429054679. LCCN 2020053761. OCLC 1227789483. S2CID 242526375.
19. McLellan, Alec (2020). From Lamanai to Ka'kabish : human and environment interaction, settlement change, and urbanism in northern Belize (PhD). University College London.
20. Nichols, Deborah L., ed. (2012). The Oxford handbook of Mesoamerican archaeology. Oxford: Oxford University Press. doi:10.1093/oxfordhb/9780195390933.001.0001. ISBN 9780195390933.
21. OED (2007a). "preclassic". Oxford English Dictionary (online ed.). Oxford University Press. (Subscription or participating institution membership required.)
22. OED (2007b). "post-classic". Oxford English Dictionary (online ed.). Oxford University Press. (Subscription or participating institution membership required.)
23. OED (2007c). "Palaeo-Indian". Oxford English Dictionary (online ed.). Oxford University Press. (Subscription or participating institution membership required.)
24. Pearsall, Deborah M., ed. (2008). Encyclopedia of Archaeology. San Diego, Calif.: Elsevier. OCLC 714030453.
25. Rosenswig, Robert M. (2021). "Opinions on the Lowland Maya Late Archaic Period with Some Evidence from Northern Belize". Ancient Mesoamerica. 32 (3): 461–474. doi:10.1017/S0956536121000018. S2CID 245125324.
26. Rushton, Elizabeth A. C. (2014). 'Under the shade I flourish' : an environmental history of northern Belize over the last three thousand five hundred years (PhD). University of Nottingham.
27. Saturno, William A.; Stuart, David; Beltran, Boris (2006). "Early Maya Writing at San Bartolo, Guatemala". Science. 311 (5765): 1281–1283. Bibcode:2006Sci...311.1281S. doi:10.1126/science.1121745. PMID 16400112. S2CID 46351994.
28. Sharer, Robert J.; Traxler, Loa P., eds. (2006). The Ancient Maya (6th ed.). Stanford, Calif.: Stanford University Press. hdl:2027/mdp.39015062626216. OCLC 57577446.
29. Stemp, W. James; Awe, Jaime J.; Marcus, Joyce; Helmke, Christophe; Sullivan, Lauren A. (2021). "The Preceramic and Early Ceramic Periods in Belize and the Central Maya Lowlands". Ancient Mesoamerica. 32 (3): 416–438. doi:10.1017/S0956536121000444. S2CID 245125311.
30. Stuart, David; Hurst, Heather; Beltran, Boris; Saturno, William A. (2022). "An early Maya calendar record from San Bartolo, Guatemala". Science Advances. 8 (15): 1–12 of article no. eabl9290. Bibcode:2022SciA....8L9290S. doi:10.1126/sciadv.abl9290. PMC 9007507. PMID 35417231.
31. Tiesler, Vera, ed. (2022). The Routledge Handbook of Mesoamerican Bioarchaeology. London: Routledge. doi:10.4324/9780429341618. ISBN 9780429341618. S2CID 248676019.
32. Valdez Jr., Fred; Sullivan, Lauren A.; Buttles, Palma J.; Aebersold, Luisa (2021). "The Origins and Identification of the Early Maya from Colha and Northern Belize". Ancient Mesoamerica. 32 (3): 502–518. doi:10.1017/S0956536121000468. S2CID 245125274.
33. Vazquez Barke, Gabriela (August 2012). BACALAR EN EL SIGLO XVII: colonización y resistencia (MA). Mérida, Yuc.: Centro de Investigaciones y Estudios Superiores en Antropología Social.
34. Vazquez Barke, Gabriela (2016). Los poderes y los hombres (PhD). Mérida, Yuc.: Centro de Investigaciones y Estudios Superiores en Antropología Social.
35. Wrobel, Gabriel D.; Hoggarth, Julie A.; Marshall, Aubree (2021). "Before the Maya: A Review of Paleoindian and Archaic Human Skeletons Found in the Maya Region". Ancient Mesoamerica. 32 (3): 475–485. doi:10.1017/S0956536121000250. S2CID 245125288.
