= Tipu rebellion =

1638 Maya revolt in Yucatan

Coordinates: 17.458°N 88.629°W

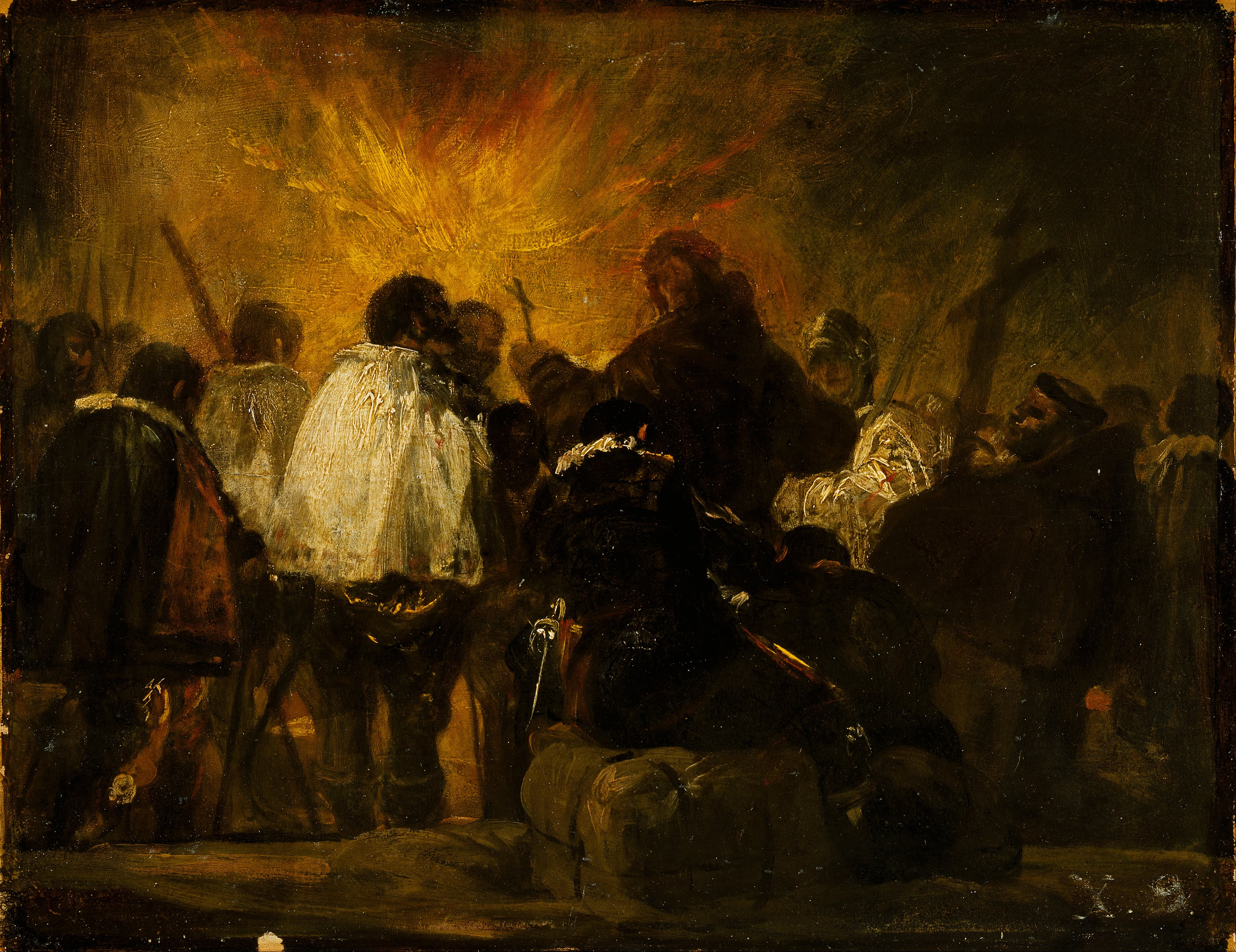
- Night Scene from the Inquisition
- Date: 1638
- Location: Southern Bacalar district
- Caused by: Spanish extortion and mistreatment
- Goals: To escape Spanish impositions
- Methods: Maya flight from reduccion settlements; torching; threat of force
- Result: Spanish lose effective control in southern Bacalar; Maya gain de facto autonomy in southern Bacalar

Parties
| Tipu; Peten Itza; 8 reduccion settlements | Bacalar; Spanish Yucatan; 6 reduccion settlements |

Lead figures
| Batab of Tipu (Note: Name unknown or missing.); Kan Ek' of Peten Itza; Pedro Noh (Note: A batab ('mayor'; cacique to the Spanish).); Francisco Yam; Luis Kinil; Pedro Noh; Gaspar Chuc (Note: A war captain.); Gaspar Puc (Note: An alcalde.); Andrés Uxul | Luis Sánchez de Aguilar; Diego Zapata de Cárdenas (Note: Governor of Spanish Yucatan.); Gregorio Marín de Aguilar (Note: A secular priest.); Francisco Sánchez de la Seña (Note: An alférez mayor.); Cristóbal Delgado (Note: A regidor (member of a cabildo).); Bartolomé Gómez de Santoyo; Juan Martín de los Cedros (Note: A scribe.) |

Number
| c. 300 Maya households | c. 50 Spanish vecinos; < 150 Maya households |

Casualties and losses
- Deaths: 1 Franciscan friar (of illness)
- Injuries: 9 to 10 Maya people (tortured); > 80 Maya children and adults (flogged)
- Arrested: 9 to 10 Maya people
- Damage: 3 to 8 reduccion settlements (torched)
- Detained: > 80 Maya children and adults; 2 Franciscan friars and 1 Maya guide

The Tipu rebellion (Note: Also Tipuj for Tipu. Also revolt or uprising for rebellion.) was a successful and widespread revolt by Maya residents of the southern portion of the Bacalar district, in what is now Belize, in 1638. The uprising avoided open hostilities, and rather involved the mass desertion of Spanish reduccion settlements by their Maya inhabitants, with coordination by Tipu, the principal reduccion town in southern Bacalar. It followed decades of deteriorationg relations between the Maya and Spanish of the district, part of broader tensions between the same across Spanish Yucatan, due to increasingly-vexing civil and religious impositions on the former. The rebellion is thought to have been backed by the yet-unconquered Peten Itza kingdom, Tipu's neighbours to the west, and resulted in de facto Maya self-rule and loss of Spanish dominion in southern Bacalar, a state of affairs which lasted until the 1690s, when the rebel Maya acceded to Spanish authority during the conquest of Peten.

== Background ==
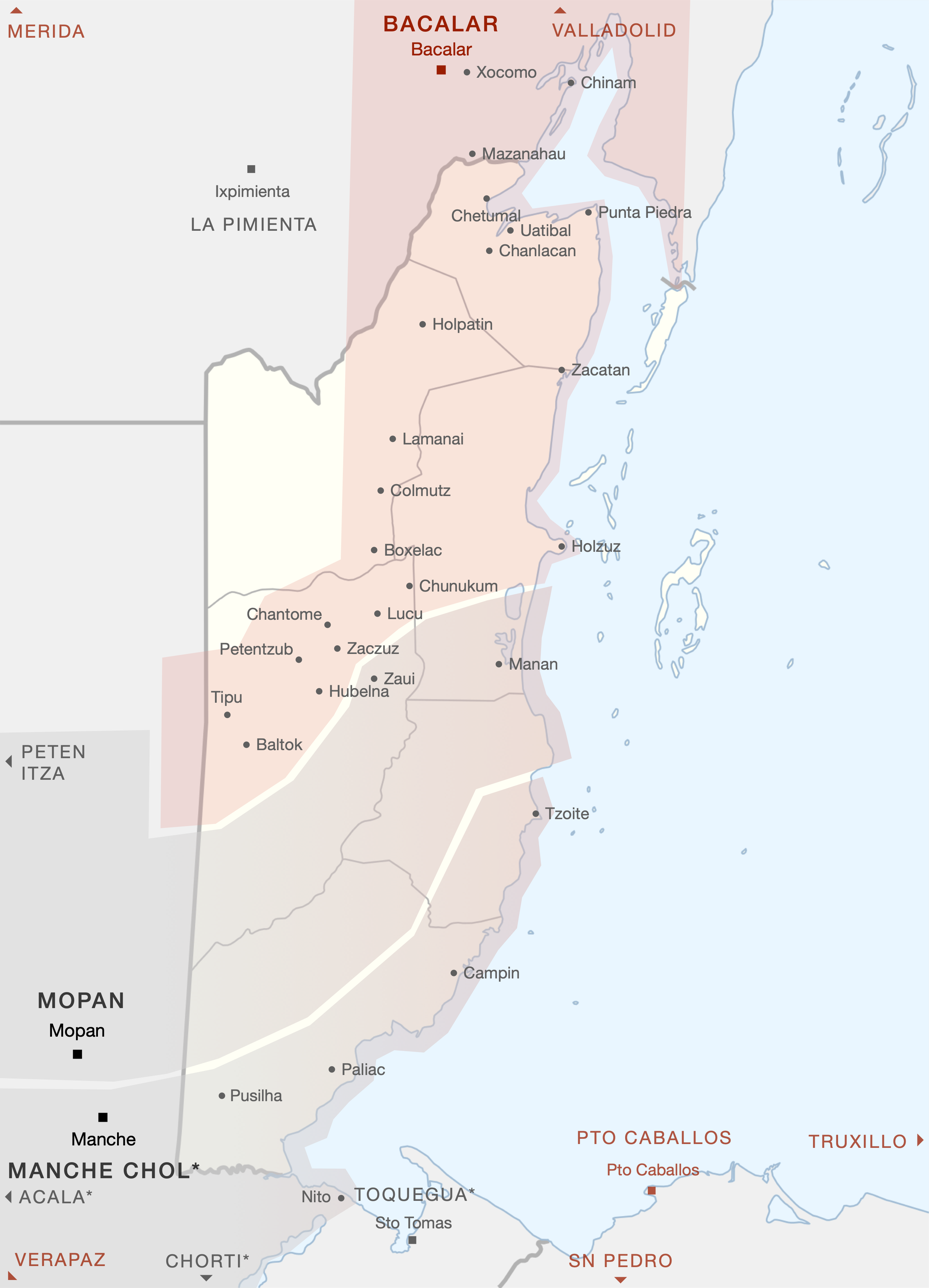
Bacalar district prior to the rebellion (mid-16th century)

In the early 17th century, relations between the Maya and the Spanish in Yucatan seemingly began to fray. Tensions reached a fever pitch in the 1620s, when Maya residents (or authorities) of Nojpeten and Sacalum each independently massacred (or summarily executed) a number of Spanish soldiers and clergymen, along with their Maya porters and guides, both in 1623. According to Mayanist Grant D. Jones, this was significant because "not since 1546 had execution as a tool of rebellion on such a large scale been seen in Yucatan".

The Bacalar district, in the south-eastern portion of the peninsula, escaped such outright violence, but not the strain between its Maya and Spanish residents, particularly in the southern half of the district, which had formerly been the Dzuluinicob province, and was now subject to rule by the cabildo in the northern Bacalar villa. In 1619, Franciscan friars Juan de Orbita and Bartolomé de Fuensalida found that the Maya of Tipu (the Tipuans), Bacalar's principal visita and reduccion settlement to the south, had reverted to "idolatry" (Maya polytheism), and so dispensed swift "justice" by destroying the discovered "idols" (religious effigies). This insult was followed by a punishing tax hike in 1622, when the district's encomiendas were reconsolidated, and by the imposition of a secular priest, Gregorio Marín de Aguilar, who arrived to reside in Tipu in 1632.

In 1637, having had enough of Marín and the vecinos of Bacalar, Tipu sent emissaries to the defensor de naturales (Note: An office akin to protector de indios.) for Spanish Yucatan in Merida, to report the same for mistreatment and extortion. Upon receiving the defensor's report and recommendations, governor Diego Zapata de Cárdenas relieved Marín of his post, reprimanded the cabildo of Bacalar, and despatched two investigadores (Note: Authorised to investigate alleged offences, and to charge, prosecute, try, and sentence offenders.) to follow up on the extortion allegations. When said officials reached the villa, though, they were swiftly detained whilst the vecinos built impromptu gallows in the main plaza, apparently to hang the former to death. Happily, the frazzled investigadores managed to make their escape, but the harrowing incident convinced Zapata to desist from attempting to curb the vecinos' alleged extortion.

That same year, whilst the Tipuan emissaries were still in Merida, Zapata was informed by Bacalar that nearly all of Tipu had rebelled against the Spanish crown by illicitly deserting their reduccion town. The governor sent the envoys back home, to urge the Maya to return to Tipu as lawfully required, or face "grave consequences". In response, the batab of Tipu advised the governor, in 1637 or 1638, that residents had fled for fear that an armed entrada (Note: A sort of Spanish military expedition.) from Bacalar was imminent, and that the authorities (himself, his lieutenant, an alcalde) remained in town, and would endeavour to entice runaways to return.

=== Distal causes ===
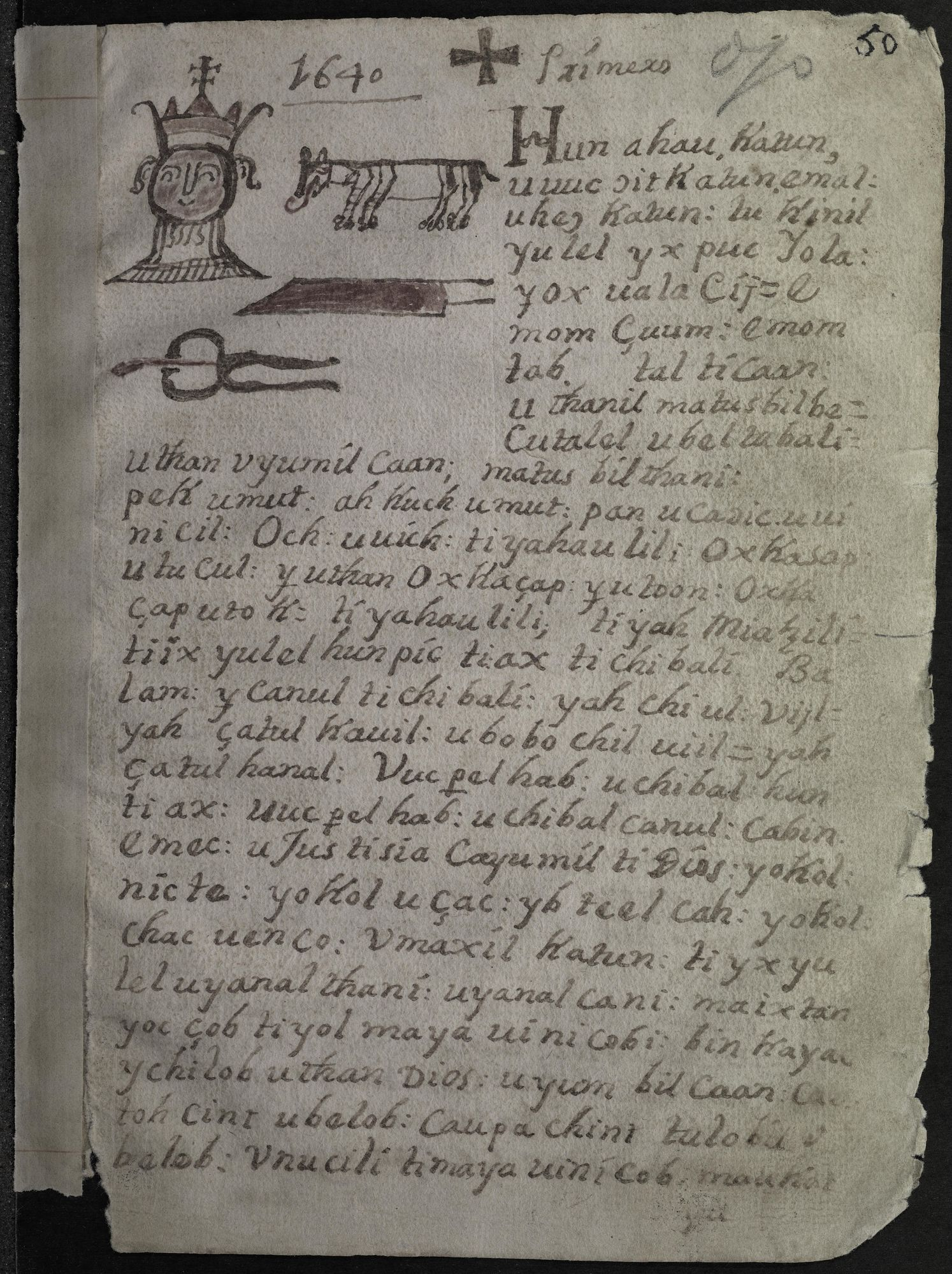
Maya chilams' prophecies for k'atun 1 ahaw may have partly motivated the rebellion (Chilam Balam excerpt pictured)

In addition to increasing Maya discontent with the Spanish, the early 17th century also ushered in a new k'atun, and possibly an uptick in local piracy, either of which may have aggravated the said unease in the Bacalar district.

The sixth k'atun of the Short Count, k'atun 1 ahaw, (Note: Also anglicised as Katun 1 Ahau.) which began on 6 June 1638, had been prophesied as a time of natural disasters and rebellion by Maya chilams. In the extant Chilam Balam of Chumayel, the esoteric prophecy for said k'atun is read by scholars as alluding, literally or metaphorically, to "fire and hurricane rains" or "a parching whirlwind storm", and to a "great war" waged to the north (possibly up to Tihosuco) by the Chans (a ch'ibal or 'noble house' of Peten Itza) and their allies.

As with prophecy, the contribution of piracy to unrest in Bacalar is difficult to ascertain, though Jones notes that "increasing depredations ... certainly would have stimulated coastal Mayas to seek refuge in interior locations around Tipu". By the early 17th century, the district's residents would have been well-acquainted with the dangers of coastal living in the inner Bay of Honduras (raids), as said waters had been haunted by sea rovers since the mid-16th century. And in the 1630s, the bay became even more attractive to the British and Dutch pirates, due to a sharp spike in Spanish demand for illicit trade with them.

== Rebellion ==
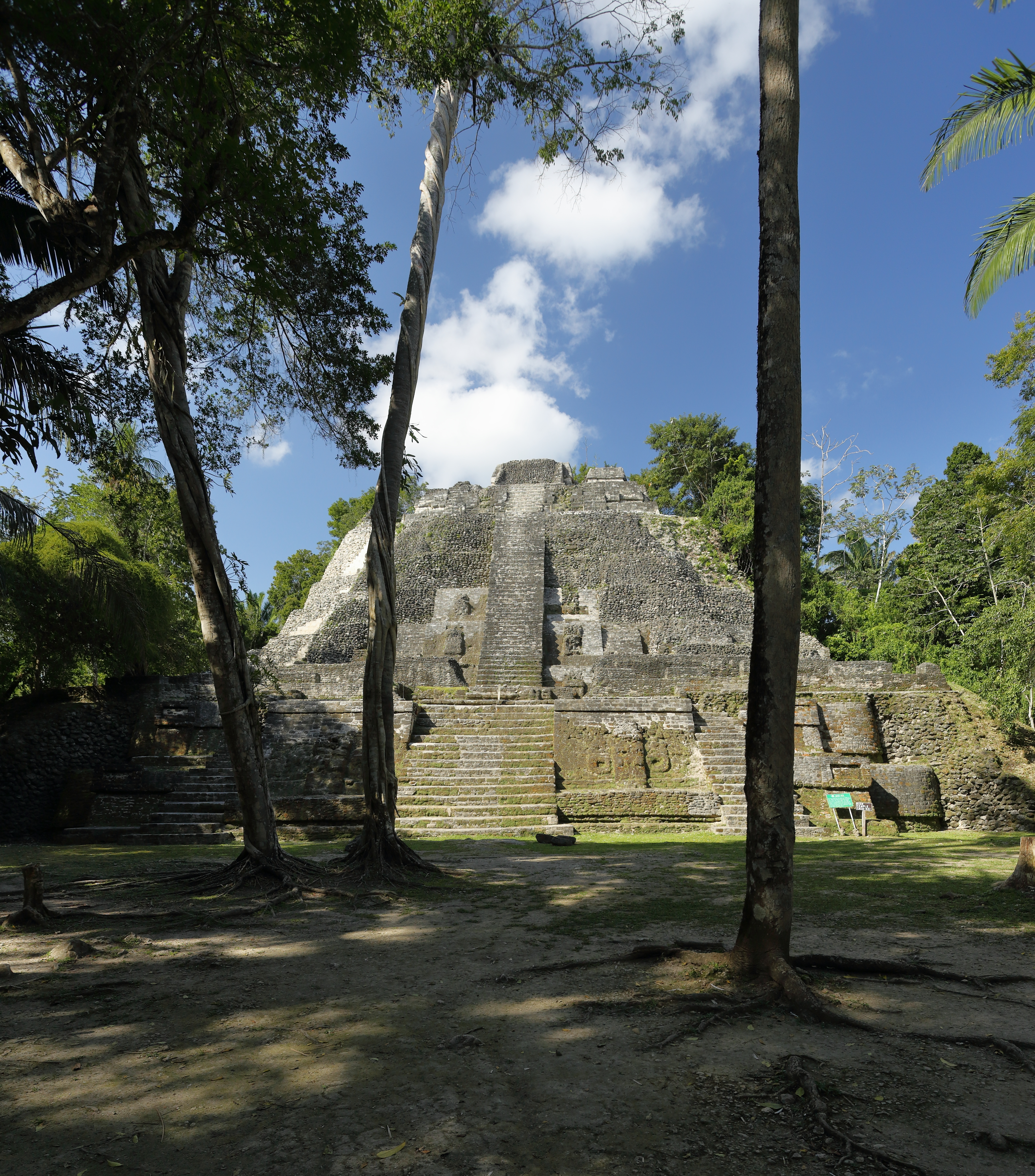
Lamanai (reduccion settlement on the New River) was deserted and torched during the rebellion (Classic ruins pictured)

At some uncertain point before September 1638, the Maya of Tipu apparently set out to recruit participants for a widespread rebellion, visiting a number of reduccion or encomienda settlements in their vicinity in the southern Bacalar. On 20 September, alcalde Luís Sánchez de Aguilar informed Zapata of said programme, adding that the Tipuans had advised recruits that "they were to give obedience to their king and [that they] wished them to abandon their town, saying that if they did not do so all would die and be finished, because at such a time the Itzas would come to kill them and there would be many deaths, and hurricanes would flood the land". That is, Tipu seemingly pressed their neighbours to swear allegiance to the Kan Ek' of Peten Itza, and to forsake the posts assigned to them by the Spanish in favour of an outpost (Tipu) both farther from Bacalar's oppressive reach and closer to Peten Itza's defensive range. Moreover, they seem to have appended their call to action with threats of force of arms or calamity, likely made credible by Peten Itza's stature, close relations between Tipu and said kingdom, and chilams' prophecies for the coming k'atun.

However they managed it, the Tipuan campaign proved effective, as in his 20 September letter to Zapata, Sanchez reported that a quarter of Maya residents in the district's south had illicitly abandoned their assigned villages. And by 5 November, a little under 200 of Bacalar's approximately 300 Maya tributaries (families or households in encomienda) had likewise fled to Tipu.

That same September, upon discovering that the coastal reduccion hamlets of Chinam, Manan, and Zacatan had been deserted, Sanchez, with the procurador and 16 vecinos, set out to capture the escaped residents. They located all runaways from Manan, but only four from Chinam and none from Zacatan. The escapees were first imprisoned and flogged in the villa (despite assurances to the contrary), then forcibly resettled in Tamalcab, on a caye just off Lake Bacalar in the upper Chetumal Bay, thus situating them closer to the Spanish than before. By the month's end, the cabildo and vecinos, with Maya aides from San Juan de Extramuros (reduccion suburb just outside Bacalar villa), were attempting to resettle Pacha, Yumpeten, Soite, Manan, and Xibun, all of which had likewise been deserted. By the year's end, though, their response had apparently been too little or come too late, as on 5 November, Sanchez reported that they had had little success, adding that "right now the Indians are very bellicose".

Meanwhile, from Merida, Zapata supplied the Spanish in Bacalar with gunpowder and ammunition for their reduccion efforts, but declined the cabildo's request for reinforcements, possibly because he did not wish to breach existing royal policy, which favoured intercession by clergy over force of arms to address non-violent revolts by Amerindian subjects. The governor, then, petitioned the Franciscans in the city to despatch three or four friars to the district, but these would not set out until 1642, and like the cabildo, would also fail to quell the uprising.

== Aftermath ==
Bacalar district after the rebellion (mid-17th century prior to villa's relocation)

Notice of the rebellion spread across Spanish Yucatan within the year. By February 1639, a secular cleric in Sotuta reported that "news has come from Bacalar that those few towns [reduccion settlements in the district] had been going to the forests, encouraged and deceived by those barbarous infidels of the Tah Itzaes [of Tah Itza], becoming one with them, as a result of which Bacalar will become more deserted and short of people." That year, Zapata and the ecclesiastic cabildo of Merida directed secular cleric Ambrosio de Figueroa to make his way south to assuage the Maya. Figueroa first sent runners down to Tipu, to announce himself and his peaceable intent, "but the rebels made fun of [his messengers] and threatened to kill them if they came back", thus bringing his mission to an early close, though Tipu indicated that they would meet with Franciscan friars, on the condition that the current secular priest of Bacalar be relieved by a Franciscan one.

Accordingly, Zapata and the bishop of Merida despatched the Franciscan friars Bartolomé de Fuensalida, Juan de Estrada, Bartolomé de Becerril, and Martín Tejero, on 24 April 1641, with 500 pesos for a six-month reduccion, and instructions to replace Bacalar's secular priest. The friars reached the villa soon, and there determined that Fuensalida and Estrada continue on to Tipu, that Becerril resettle deserted villages on the coast, and that Tejero remain behind to fill in as parish priest.

Fuensalida and Estrada, with 21 Maya carriers and guides, never made it to Tipu, however, despite their best endeavours. By June, the friars had reached Zaczuz, a former reduccion settlement (now deserted), and the last stop on the overland route from Bacalar to Tipu (via the New and Old rivers). As per custom, they here requested permission to continue on to Tipu, but to their surprise, were soundly rebuffed, and could not manage to negotiate their way to a friendly reception. On 2 July, they were instead led to Hubelna, an unauthorised hamlet of former Zaczuz residents. The next day, authorities from Tipu and Peten Itza, with an armed entourage, met the friars there and made it clear to them that they were most unwelcome in Tipu, whereupon Fuensalida and Estrada were escorted back onto the course to Bacalar. Once in the villa, Fuensalida promptly reported their failure, advising Zapata that a militant reduccion was now the only viable option to quell the revolt. The governor recalled the Franciscan friars and took no further action, citing a lack of authority to sanction an armed entrada to southern Bacalar.

Becerril had better luck on the shores of southern Bacalar, as he and Tejero managed to resettle four reduccion villages on the Sittee, the Monkey River, and an unidentified caye known to them as Zula. According to Jones, this warmer reception may have been due to residents' cultural remove from Tipuans, or to the coast's geographic remove from Tipu. Whatever the reason, though, the friars' luck was short-lived, as piratical raids in 1641 and 1642 convinced the resettled Maya to once again take flight and move farther inland.

By early 1643, the Spanish counted eight of Bacalar's reduccion settlements (totalling some 300 Maya households) as being in rebellion (still resettled near Tipu), leaving only six reduccion settlements (totalling under 150 Maya households) under encomienda in the district.

== Legacy ==
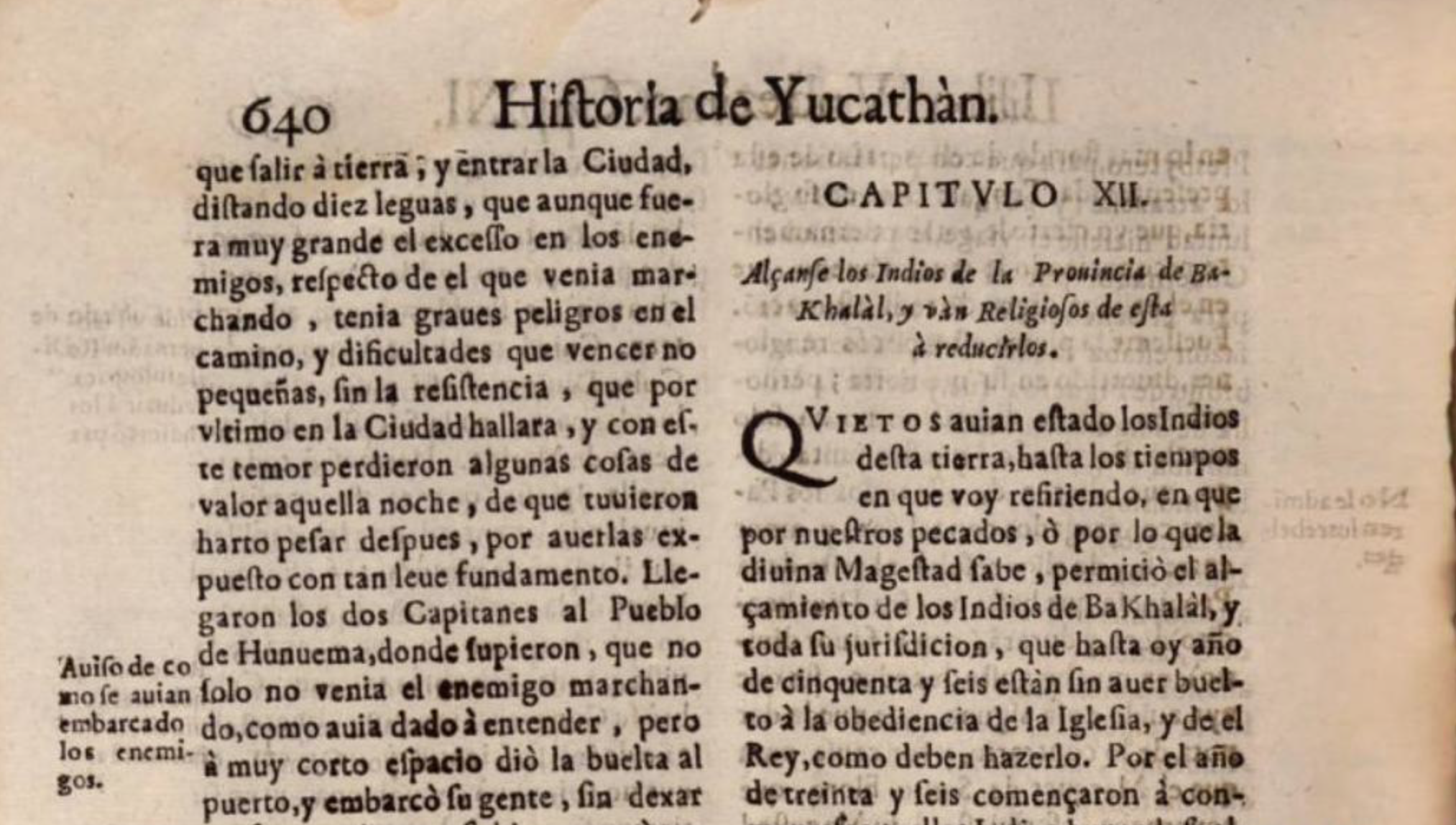
Cogolludo's Historia de Yucathan offered the first notice of the rebellion in print (relevant passage pictured)

In mid-1652, the villa of Bacalar, and those reduccion settlements that still remained under their rule, were removed from the upper Chetumal Bay and relocated north to Pacha, and then moved even further inland, up to Chunhuhub, in the 1660s. The villa would not return to its original site on Lake Bacalar until early 1727, during Spanish efforts to stamp out the Bay settlement, whilst the district's former reduccion settlements (Tipu and revolt participants) would not again accede to Spanish authority until mid-1695, during events leading up to the fall of Nojpeten.

Diego López de Cogolludo first brought the Tipu rebellion to wide notice in his Historia de Yucathan, published in 1688. The cronista de Indias reported, "The Indians of this area had been quiet up until the period that I am going to describe, in which, because of our sins or some other reason that only God knows, He permitted the uprising of the Indians of Bacalar and all the areas under its jurisdiction. Even today, in 1656, they have not returned to the obedience that they owe the church and the king. By 1636 they began to cause problems, with some of them leaving their towns, along with some of this province, going to the forests of Tipu, which ... are the closest to the gentile Itzas. This continued until 1638, when they completely refused to obey God and the king, horribly rejecting our holy faith".

The rebellion was also noted in a manuscript by Francisco de Cárdenas Valencia, written in 1639 and first published in 1937, and most thoroughly explored in Jones's Maya Resistance to Spanish Rule, published in 1989. The latter author notes that Bacalar's extant historical record is poor and gappy, though, leaving quite a few details regarding the rebellion and its aftermath unclear.

== See also ==
- Cisteil rebellion – similar 18th century revolt
- Caste War – similar 19th century civil war
- List of Maya rebellions in New Spain

== Notes and references ==
=== References ===
1. Adams, Eleanor B. (July 1945). "Note on the Life of Francisco de Cárdenas Valencia". The Americas. 2 (1): 21–29. JSTOR 978539.
2. Barrera Vásquez, Alfredo; Bastarrachea Manzano, Juan Ramón; Brito Sansores, William; Vermont Salas, Refugio; Dzul Góngora, David; Dzul Poot, Domingo, eds. (1980). Diccionario maya Cordemex : maya-español, español-maya (1st ed.). Mérida, Yuc.: Ediciones Cordemex. OCLC 7550928.
3. Bialuschewski, Arne (2017). "Slaves of the Buccaneers: Mayas in Captivity in the Second Half of the Seventeenth Century". Ethnohistory. 64 (1): 41–63. doi:10.1215/00141801-3688359.
4. Bialuschewski, Arne (2020). "Juan Gallardo: A Native American Buccaneer". Hispanic American Historical Review. 100 (2): 233–256. doi:10.1215/00182168-8178200.
5. Cárdenas Valencia, Francisco de (1937). Relación historial eclesiástica de la provincia de Yucatán de la Nueva España, escrita el año de 1639. Biblioteca histórica mexicana de obras inéditas. Vol. 3 (1st ed.). México, Dist. Fed.: Antigua Librería Robredo, J. Porrúa e Hijos. hdl:2027/txu.059173018271330. OCLC 4660610.
6. Cardona Amaya, José Manuel (2020). Invasiones de corsarios a la Honduras de Felipe IV (1633-1643) (1st ed.). Tegucigalpa: Universidad Nacional Autónoma de Honduras. ISBN 9789992612620.
7. Edmonson, Munro S.; Hoíl, Juan José, eds. (1986). Heaven born Merida and its destiny : the Book of Chilam Balam of Chumayel. The Texas Pan American series (1st ed.). Austin, Tex.: University of Texas Press. hdl:2027/mdp.39015037288761. OCLC 12421934.
8. García Paláez, Francisco de Paula (1852). Memorias para la historia del antiguo reyno de Guatemala. Vol. 2 (1st ed.). Guatemala City: Establecimiento tip. de L. Luna.
9. Gerhard, Peter (1979). The Southeast Frontier of New Spain (1st ed.). Princeton, New Jers.: Princeton University Press. hdl:2027/uc1.b4906135. OCLC 4529742.
10. Graham, Elizabeth A. (2011). Maya Christians and Their Churches in Sixteenth-Century Belize. Maya studies. Gainesville, Florida: University Press of Florida. OCLC 751694131.
11. Jones, Grant D. (1977). Anthropology and History in Yucatán. Texas Pan American series (1st ed.). Austin, Tex.: University of Texas Press. hdl:2027/heb.03643. OCLC 232171745.
12. Jones, Grant D. (1989). Maya resistance to Spanish rule: time and history on a colonial frontier (1st ed.). Albuquerque, New Mex.: University of New Mexico Press. ISBN 082631161X. OCLC 20012099.
13. Jones, Grant D. (1998). Conquest of the Last Maya Kingdom (1st ed.). Stanford, Calif.: Stanford University Press. hdl:2027/heb.03515. OCLC 38747674.
14. Lehmann, Christian (16 December 2018). "Ortografía". La lengua maya de Yucatán. Christian Lehmann.
15. López de Cogolludo, Diego (1688). Historia de Yucathan (1st ed.). Madrid: Por Jvan Garcia Infanzen. OCLC 85799316.
16. MacLeod, Murdo J. (1973). Spanish Central America: A Socioeconomic History, 1520–1720. Campus. Vol. 119 (1st ed.). Berkeley, CA: University of California Press. ISBN 0520021371. OCLC 762163.
17. Molina Solís, Juan Francisco (1910). Historia de Yucatán durante la dominación española. Vol. 2 (1st ed.). Mérida, Yuc.: Impr. de la Loteria del estado. OCLC 13381125.
18. Newton, Arthur Percival (1914). The colonising activities of the English Puritans: the last phase of the Elizabethan struggle with Spain. Yale Historical Publications: Miscellany. Vol. 1 (1st ed.). New Haven, CT: Yale University Press. hdl:2027/hvd.32044014678932. OCLC 2993127.
19. Obando Andrade, Rafael (2016). "Zambos y negros de La Taguzgalpa: actores claves en el contrabando centroamericano. 1642-1715". Revista cuadernos del Caribe. 13 (21): 7–20.
20. Reichert, Rafal (January–June 2017). "El golfo de Honduras: estrategias geopolíticas y militares de una frontera imperial, siglos XVI-XVIII". Tzintzun. 65: 9–40.
21. Roys, Ralph L.; Hoíl, Juan José, eds. (1967). The book of Chilam Balam of Chumayel. Civilization of the American Indian series. Vol. 87 (New ed.). Norma, Okl.: University of Oklahoma Press. hdl:2027/mdp.39015064833323. OCLC 224990.
22. Scofield, Bruce (2002). "The Maya Katun Prophecies". One Reed Publications. Bruce Scofield and Barry C. Orr.
23. Sharer, Robert J.; Traxler, Loa P., eds. (2006). The ancient Maya (6th ed.). Stanford, Calif.: Stanford University Press. hdl:2027/mdp.39015062626216. ISBN 0804748160. OCLC 57577446.
24. Vazquez Barke, Gabriela (August 2012). BACALAR EN EL SIGLO XVII: colonización y resistencia (MA). Mérida, Yuc.: Centro de Investigaciones y Estudios Superiores en Antropología Social.
25. Vazquez Barke, Gabriela (2016). Los poderes y los hombres (PhD). Mérida, Yuc.: Centro de Investigaciones y Estudios Superiores en Antropología Social.
26. Zahedieh, Nuala (1986). "Trade, Plunder, and Economic Development in Early English Jamaica, 1655-89". Economic History Review. 39 (2): 205–222. JSTOR 2596150.
