= Peter Wallace (buccaneer) =

British buccaneer in Belize, active 17th cent.

Captain Peter Wallace
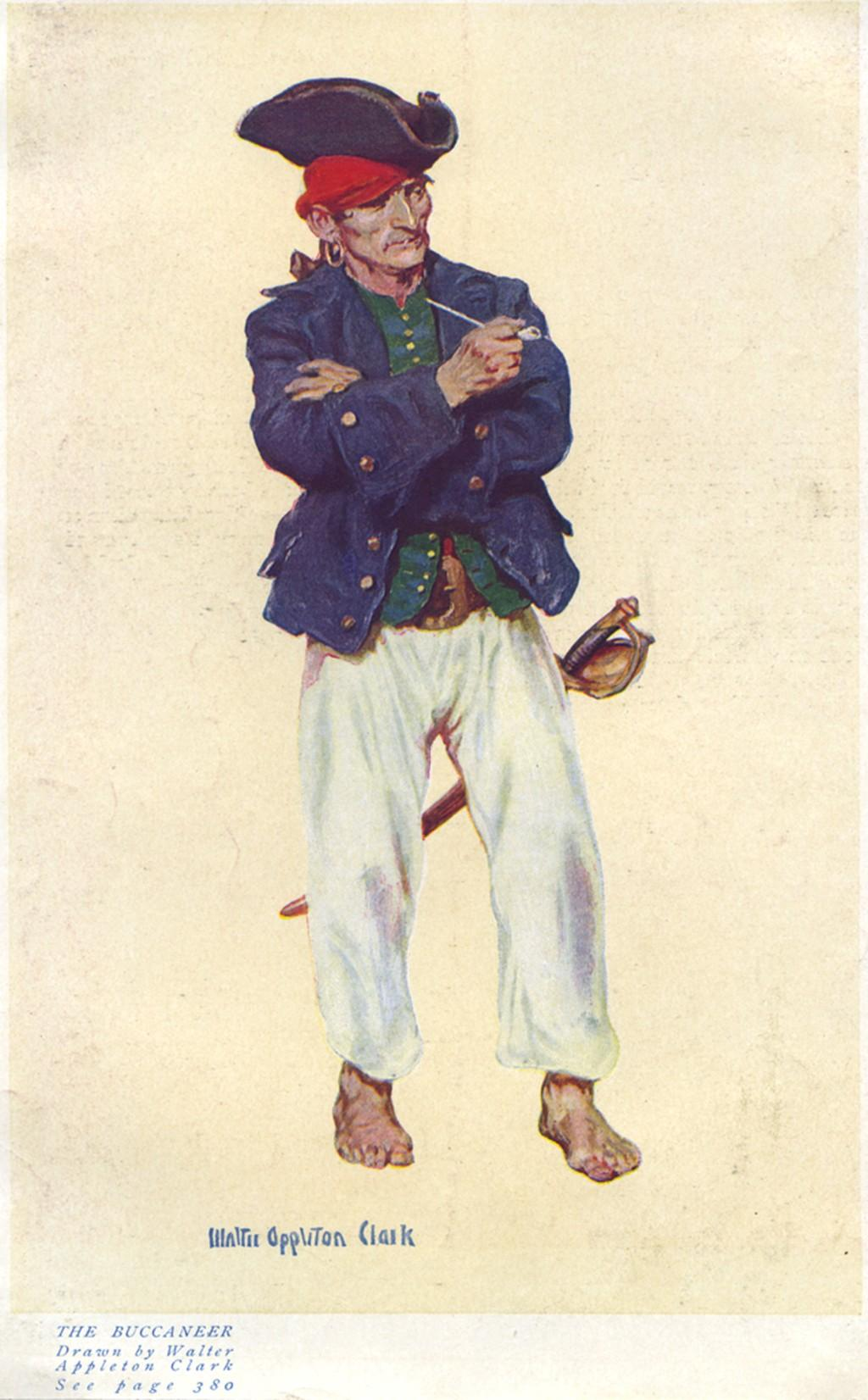
- Stereotypical buccaneer
- Born: British Isles
- Known for: Founding the Bay settlement
- Piratical career
- Type: Buccaneer
- Allegiance: Bay settlement
- Years active: mid-17th cent.
- Rank: Captain
- Base of operations: Bay of Honduras
- Commands: Swallow

Peter Wallace (Note: Surname also Wallice, Wallis, Willis. Surname possibly corrupted in Spanish as: Walis, Wallix, Valiss, Valiz, Balis, Balles, Balize, Bellesse, Bellize, Belize, Belice.) (fl. mid-17th cent.) is commonly held to have been a British buccaneer who, in the mid-17th century, founded the Bay settlement, predecessor polity of modern Belize, thereby becoming one of the first Baymen and establishing the earliest non-Amerindian state in the area. Most commonly, he is said to have done so by landing the Swallow on Swallow Caye in 1638. He is thought to have entered local oral tradition by the 1820s, and has been discussed in literature since then, with his historicity being a primary topic of debate. Recent scholarship has tended to regard him as most likely an apocryphal figure of Belize's founding myth, though he (or his legend) persists in the country's popular culture today.

== Career ==
Belize's treacherous waters are commonly thought to have attracted 17th century buccaneers

A number of differing stories have been told regarding Wallace's career, though virtually all of them credit him with founding the Bay settlement, thus making him one of the first Baymen in history, responsible for establishing the earliest non-Amerindian polity in what is now Belize. The most oft-repeated of these holds that in 1638, Wallace and some 80 British buccaneers aboard the Swallow landed on Swallow Caye, four miles (circa six kilometres) east of the Haulover Creek mouth, and decided to settle in the area. Variations on this telling include:

- The buccaneers were a few, and they were forced to settle after being wrecked in 1638.
- The buccaneers settled during the period of the English Protectorate in the 1650s.
- The buccaneers were Campeachymen, and they settled after the late 1716 Spanish capture of their Campeachy settlement (in Lake Terminos) in 1717.
- Wallace landed at the Haulover's mouth in the mid-17th century.
- Wallace landed in 1603–1604, 1610, 1640, or after the early 1667 signing of the Earl of Sandwich's Treaty.

== Legacy ==
Wallace appeared in local buccaneering myths and legends of the Bay settlement by at least the 1820s, being first set to print in the Honduras Almanack for 1829. His Swallow, in addition, is ostensibly the namesake of Swallow Caye. His surname, similarly, has been often claimed as the etymological source of the Belize toponym, via its linguistic corruption by Spanish speakers. This last point, however, has been contested as a folk etymology, with competing theories proposed.

Today, Wallace endures in the lay literature or popular culture of Belize, it being not uncommon to remark on him or his story in passing.

=== Scholarly ===
Wallace first appeared in literature in the Honduras Almanack for 1829, an official publication of the Bay settlement, printed in 1826 or 1827. It described "Wallice" as a "Lieutenant among the Bucaniers who formerly infested these seas", and who "first discovered the mouth of the River Belize". The Almanack for 1839 added: "Belize owes its origin to a Scotch Corsair Chief of the name of Wallace, a native of Falkland in Kinrosshire. At the time that these formidable pirates were driven from Tortuga, a small island situated a few miles north of St. Domingo, Wallace to escape from the just vengeance of the Spaniards fled for security amongst the numerous islands on the coast of Yucatan and finally settled at the mouth of the River Belize. Here after many vicissitudes both by sea and land Wallace fixed his residence, erected a few log huts and a small fortalice, which stood on the site now occupied by the handsome premises of Messrs. Boitias and Delande".

The Almanack stories were soon popularised by John Lloyd Stephens, in his 1841 Incidents of Travel. In Spanish literature, they were brought to wide notice by an 1849 issue of the Fénix journal by Justo Sierra O'Reilly, who added either well-sourced information (according to some historians) or manufactured embellishments (according to others). By the 1880s, the historian Archibald Gibbs described the state of scholarship on Wallace like so: "A halo of romance surrounds the early history of British Honduras, legend assigning this region as the scene of many a daring exploit, many a riotous orgie, in the good old times when the adventurous sons of Albion roamed the Caribbean, partly under the protection of their own dreaded black flag, and sometimes under that of the country of their birth ... The central hero of this romance was a Scottish rover named Wallace, or Wallis, 'who so distinguished himself,' naively remarks the Honduras Almanac fifty-six years ago, 'by acts of bravery and desperation that his name became a terror to the Spaniards'".

==== 20th century ====
The Almanack stories perdured in anglophone and Hispanic scholarly literature throughout the 20th century, though a number of competing theories regarding Wallace's identity and career were now proffered.

- In 1925, Guatemalan historian Francisco Asturias claimed that Wallace had been Walter Raleigh's first mate during (at least) the latter's El Dorado expedition, settled Belize shortly after sailing from England on 14 May 1603, abandoned the settlement in 1617, and died in England in 1621.
- In 1946, Belizean historian E. O. Winzerling claimed that "Willis" had first settled in Tortuga in 1639 with a group of men "drawn mostly from those expelled from Nevis", became their governor, was routed from Tortuga by the French in August 1640, soon found himself at the mouth of the Belize River, and founded his settlement there "approximately in September 1640".
- In 1956, American geographer James Jerome Parsons suggested that Wallace may have been a Puritan settler of Old Providence who then settled Belize in 1641 after the former colony was captured by the Spanish.

By the end of the century, then, the aforementioned characterisation by Gibbs still held: scholarly consensus was split, with historians divided on what was fact and what fiction as regarded Wallace.

==== 21st century ====
In contrast, scholarship this century has mostly tended towards agnosticism regarding the identity and historicity of Wallace. Some historians, though, have more recently deemed this trend "incorrect", arguing that Wallace is demonstrably apocryphal. The most notable exponents of this latter school are Barbara and Victor Bulmer-Thomas, who in a 2016 Tempus paper argued that in the 1820s, George Westby and Thomas Pickstock (influential Baymen), alongside George Wilson Bridges (Jamaican historian), disseminated the said Almanack accounts despite lacking any primary sources for them. They further noted, "an extensive search for a buccaneer called 'Wallace,' 'Wallice' or 'Willis' in the 17th century reveals not surprisingly that there was no such person". This analysis has seemingly gained support since then. For instance, in response to the Bulmer-Thomases, the historian Matthew Restall added, "if Wallace had existed, there would at least be one mention of him in seventeenth or eighteenth-century sources. But there is not even a passing mention of a Wallace in any of the printed sources from the era".

== See also ==
- Piracy in the Bay of Honduras

== Notes and references ==
=== References ===
1. anon. (11 November 1828). "Honduras (From the Honduras Almanack for 1826.)". The Weekly Register. Vol. XV, no. 759. St. John's, Antigua & Barbuda: Loving & Hill. p. 4.
2. anon. (1826). The Honduras almanack, for the year of our Lord 1826 ... : Calculated to the meridian of Belize (1st ed.). Belize: Published by Authority of the Magistrates. OCLC 950944267.
3. anon. (1827). The Honduras almanack, for the year of our Lord 1827 ... : Calculated to the meridian of Belize (1st ed.). Belize: Published by Authority of the Magistrates. OCLC 950947887.
4. anon. (1829). The Honduras almanack, for the year of our Lord 1829 ... : Calculated to the meridian of Belize (1st ed.). Belize: Published by Authority of the Legislative Assembly. hdl:2027/nnc1.cu56617763. OCLC 682190774.
5. anon. (1839). The Honduras almanack, for the year of our Lord 1839... : Calculated to the meridian of Belize. Belize: Published by Authority of the Legislative Assembly. OCLC 47749493.
6. Ancona, Eligio (1877). Belice, estudio sobre el origen de ese nombre (1st ed.). Mexico: Imprenta de Gonzalo A. Esteva.
7. Ancona, Eligio (1878). Historia de Yucatan desde la època mas remota hasta nuestros dias. Vol. 2 (1st ed.). Merida: Imprenta de M. Heredia Argüelles.
8. Asturias, Francisco (1925). Belice (1st ed.). Guatemala: Sociedad de Geografía é Historia de Guatemala. hdl:2027/txu.059173022907279.
9. Avery, W. L. (1900). "British Honduras". Journal of the American Geographical Society of New York. 32 (4): 331–333. doi:10.2307/197063. JSTOR 197063.
10. Azpiroz, Manuel, ed. (23 March 1871). "Establecimiento inglés de Belice". Boletín de la Sociedad de Geografía y Estadística de la República Mexicana. 2. 4: 698–715.
11. Barbour, Violet (April 1911). "Privateers and Pirates of the West Indies". The American Historical Review. 16 (3): 529–566. doi:10.2307/1834836. JSTOR 1834836.
12. Brandow, James C.; Hotten, John Camden, eds. (1982). Omitted chapters from Hotten's original lists of persons of quality and others who went from Great Britain to the American plantations, 1600-1700: census returns, parish registers, and militia rolls from the Barbados census of 1679/80 (1st ed.). Baltimore: Genealogical Publishing Co. OCLC 8533128.
13. Bristowe, Lindsay W.; Wright, Philip (1888). The Handbook of British Honduras for 1888-89 : Comprising Historical, Statistical, and General Information Concerning the Colony, Compiled from Official and Other Reliable Records (1st ed.). Edinburgh & London: William Blackwood & Sons.
14. Bulmer-Thomas, Victor; Bulmer-Thomas, Barbara (19 November 2016). "The Origins of the Belize Settlement". Tempus (4): 137–160. ISSN 2422-2178.
15. Burdon, John Alder (1927). Brief Sketch of British Honduras (1st ed.). London: The West India Committee. OCLC 11423776.
16. Burdon, John Alder (1931). Archives of British Honduras ... : being extracts and précis from records, with maps. Vol. 1 (1st ed.). London: Sifton, Praed & Co. OCLC 3046003.
17. Burdon, John Alder, ed. (1933). From 1801-1840. Archives of British Honduras. Vol. 2. London: Sifton, Praed & Co. hdl:2027/mdp.39015028737016. OCLC 3046003.
18. Campbell, Mavis C. (2009). "Naming and History: Aspects of the Historiography of Belize". Journal of Caribbean History. 43 (1): 72–90. ProQuest 868339911.
19. Cardona Amaya, José Manuel (2020). Invasiones de corsarios a la Honduras de Felipe IV (1633-1643) (1st ed.). Tegucigalpa: Universidad Nacional Autónoma de Honduras. ISBN 9789992612620.
20. Carillo y Ancona, Crescencio (9 November 1878). "El orígen de Belice". Boletín de la Sociedad de Geografía y Estadística de la República Mexicana. 3. 4: 254–264. hdl:2027/mdp.39015008360342.
21. Cave, Roderick (January 1976). "Printing in Nineteenth-Century Belize". The Library Quarterly: Information, Community, Policy. 46 (1): 20–37. doi:10.1086/620464. JSTOR 4306599. S2CID 144005676.
22. Craig, Alan K. (April 1969). "Logwood as a Factor in the Settlement of British Honduras". Caribbean Studies. 9 (1): 53–62. JSTOR 25612108.
23. Curry, Jr., Herbert F. (July 1956). "British Honduras: From Public Meeting to Crown Colony". The Americas. 13 (1): 31–42. doi:10.2307/979212. JSTOR 979212. S2CID 143843148.
24. Donohoe, William Arlington (1964). A History of British Honduras (1st ed.). Montreal: Provincial Publishing Co.
25. Finamore, Daniel (1994). Sailors and slaves on the wood-cutting frontier : archaeology of the British Bay settlement, Belize (PhD). University of Boston. OCLC 33382653.
26. Gibbs, Archibald Robertson (1883). British Honduras: an historical and descriptive account of the colony from its settlement, 1670 (1st ed.). London: Sampson Low, Marston, Searle, & Rivington.
27. Gregg, Algar Robert (1968). British Honduras. The Corona Library (1st ed.). London: Her Majesty's Stationery Office. OCLC 465800813.
28. Griffith, William J.; Alford, Alfred E.; Bolland, Orlando N. (10 January 2022). "Belize". Encyclopaedia Britannica.
29. Grunewald, Donald (July 1965). "The Anglo-Guatemalan Dispute over British Honduras". Caribbean Studies. 5 (2): 17–44. JSTOR 25611880.
30. Hotten, John Camden, ed. (1874). The original lists of persons of quality; emigrants; religious exiles; political rebels; serving men sold for a term of years; apprentices; children stolen; maidens pressed; and others who went from Great Britain to the American plantations 1600-1700 (1st ed.). London: John Camden Hotten.
31. Humphreys, R. A. (1961). The Diplomatic History of British Honduras, 1638-1901 (1st ed.). London: Oxford University Press.
32. Kinsbruner, Jay; Langer, Erick Detlef, eds. (2008). "Wallace, Peter". Encyclopedia of Latin American History and Culture. Vol. 6 (2nd ed.). Detroit: Cengage.
33. Mancisidor, Francisco (1958). Peter Wallace : el bucanero caribeño : novela (1st ed.). Mexico: Impresora Juan Pablos. OCLC 8370209.
34. Marcus, Linda C. (1990). English influence on Belize and the Peten region of northern Guatemala, 1630 to 1763 (PhD). Southern Methodist University. OCLC 48275365. ProQuest 303887067.
35. McJunkin, David Morgan (1991). Logwood : An inquiry into the historical biogeography of Haematoxylum campechianum L. and related dyewoods of the neotropics (PhD). Los Angeles: University of California. OCLC 24057056. ProQuest 303932948.
36. Morris, Daniel (1883). The Colony of British Honduras, its Resources and Prospects; with Particular Reference to its Indigenous Plants and Economic Productions (1st ed.). London: Edward Stanford.
37. O'Reilly, Justo Sierra (5 September 1849). "OJEADA sobre el establecimiento británico de BELICE y reflexiones sobre su futura influencia". Fénix. No. 62. Campeche, Camp.: Por Gregorio Buenfil. pp. 3–4.
38. Parsons, James J. (1956). San Andrés and Providencia; English-speaking islands in the western Caribbean. University of California publications in geography, v. 12, no. 1 (1st ed.). Berkeley, CA: University of California Press. hdl:2027/mdp.39015028783234. OCLC 2823905.
39. Pavía, Lázaro (1888). Los ingleses en Mexico, ó sea, el origen y fundacion de las colonias británicas en el seno mexicano (1st ed.). Mexico: Imprenta de Jose V. Castillo.
40. Peniche, Manuel (1869). "Historia de las relaciones de España y México con Inglaterra, sobre el establecimiento de Belice". Boletín de la Sociedad de Geografía y Estadística de la República Mexicana. 2. 1: 217–256, 377–403.
41. Rubio Alpuche, Nestor (1894). Belice : Apuntes historicos y colección de tratados internacionales relativos a esta colonia británica (1st ed.). Merida: Imprenta de "La Revista de Mérida".
42. Rushton, Elizabeth Anne Cecilia (December 2014). 'Under the shade I flourish' : An environmental history of northern Belize over the last three thousand five hundred years (PhD). University of Nottingham.
43. Stephens, John L. (1841). Incidents of travel in Central America, Chiapas, and Yucatan. Vol. 1 (1st ed.). New York: Harper & Brothers. OCLC 367778932. Gale CYJOUG472700027.
44. Swayne, Eric (September 1917). "British Honduras". The Geographical Journal. 50 (3): 161–175. Bibcode:1917GeogJ..50..161S. doi:10.2307/1779904. JSTOR 1779904.
45. Temple, Robert (16 January 1857). "On British Honduras, its History, Trade, and Natural Resources". Journal of the Society of Arts. 5 (217): 113–130. JSTOR 41323634.
46. Temple, Robert (11 June 1858). "British Honduras". Journal of the Society of Arts. 6 (290): 465–471. JSTOR 41323666.
47. Temple, Robert (18 June 1858). "British Honduras". Journal of the Society of Arts. 6 (291): 484–489. JSTOR 41323667.
48. Uring, Nathaniel (1726). A history of the voyages and travels of Capt. Nathaniel Uring. With new draughts of the Bay of Honduras and the Caribbee Islands; and particularly of St. Lucia, and the Harbour of Petite Carenage; into which Ships may run in bad Weather, and be safe from all Winds and Storms. Very useful for Masters of Ships that use the Leeward Island Trade, or Jamaica (1st ed.). London: Printed by W. Wilkins, for J. Peele.
49. Waight, Larry (2022). "Peter Wallace : 'To Be, Or Not To Be'". Belize Hub.
50. Winzerling, E. O. (1946). Beginning of British Honduras, 1506-1765 (1st ed.). New York: North River Press.
