= Founding of Belize =

Coordinates: 17.532°N 88.170°W

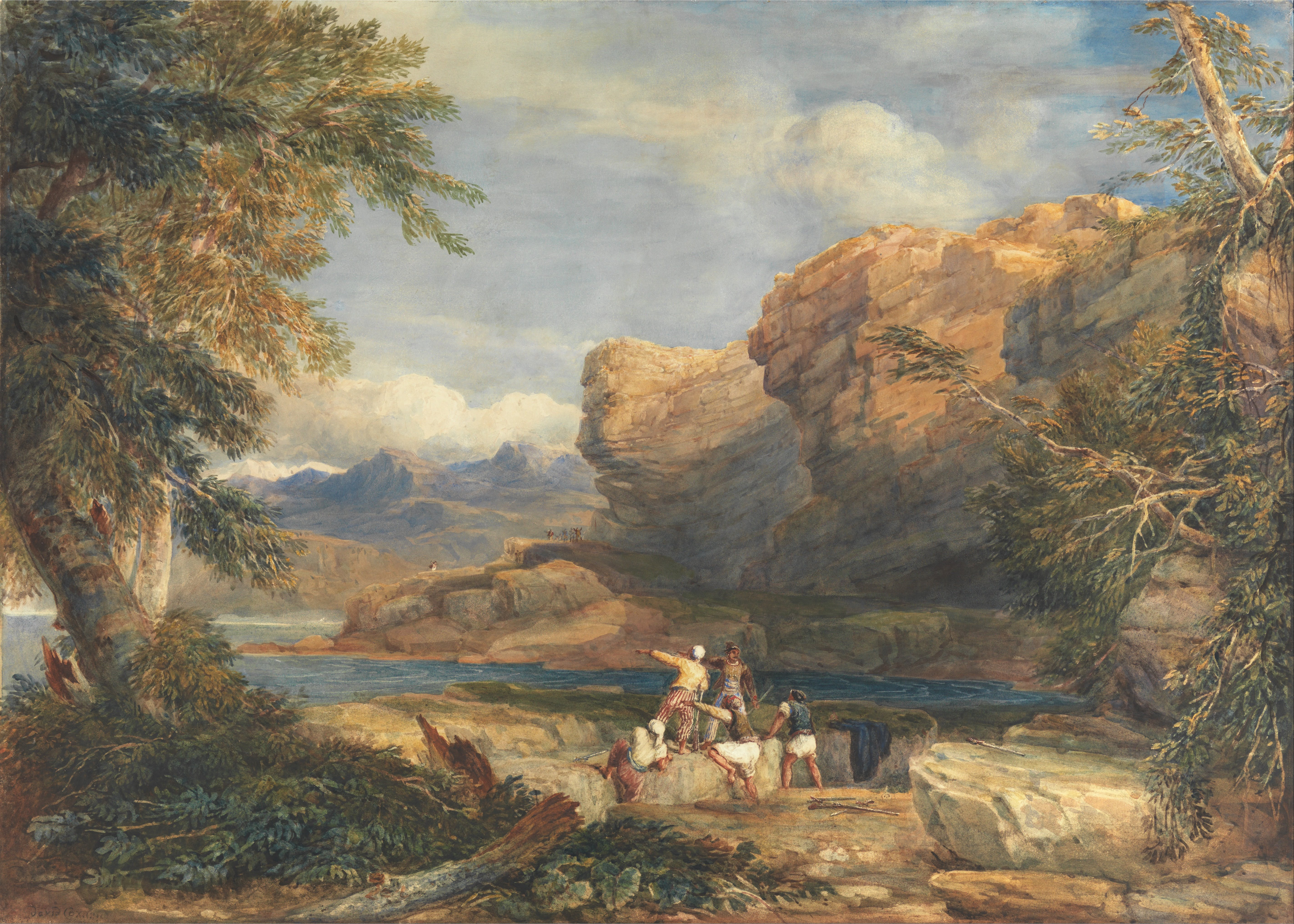
- Romanticised pirate haven
- Date: c. mid-17th cent.
- Location: Near the Belize River's mouth
- Motive: For piracy; to shelter in a pirate haven; to cut logwood; upon shipwrecking
- Participants: British buccaneers
- Outcome: Bay settlement founded; Maya and Spanish territory encroached upon; Maya residents displaced

The Bay settlement, earliest predecessor state of modern Belize, is commonly thought to have been surreptitiously founded by British buccaneers, who thereby became the first Baymen, in the 17th century, during the Spanish or Precolonial periods of the country's history. Since the 19th century, however, historians have sought but failed to locate primary sources for said founding, resulting in a myriad competing narratives of said event in scholarly and lay literature, and in the mythicisation of the same, part of the broader romanticisation of pirates in popular culture. Traditionally, the settlement has been credited to Peter Wallace, and dated to 1638. Recently, though, this traditional account has been deemed a founding myth, such that scholars now mostly favour a circumspect account of a clandestine settlement by unnamed British buccaneers, dated to the 1630s to 1670s, located near the mouth of the Belize River, and brought about by participants' piratical acts or aims. The founding encroached upon Maya and Spanish territory, the latter of which led British and Spanish authorities to deem it illicit, and further displaced the indigenous Maya population.

== Background ==
Area off the Belize River (left), favoured by 17th century pirates due to its treacherous cayes and reefs

The south-western waters of the Bay of Honduras, (Note: As historically bound from Cape Catoche to Cape Gracias a Dios.) off the south-eastern coast of the Yucatan Peninsula, (Note: As historically bound from Lake Terminos to Amatique Bay.) now encompassed by Belize, lay within Spanish (Bacalar district) and Maya (Mopan and Manche Chol polities) jurisdiction in the late 16th and throughout the 17th centuries. They are thought to have first served as a haven for Caribbean pirates in the late 16th century, possibly by the 1570s. The intricate, secluded geography (for safe haven), and proximity to Spanish ports (for easy booty), may have been the area's primary attraction for them.

Pirates first entered said bay in late 1544, when a patax of 22 French corsairs, Pedro Braques (Note: So called by the Spanish.) captain, were discovered off Honduras-Higueras by the Spanish. British pirates first did so in early 1573, when Francis Drake (in the Minion) or John Oxenham (Bear) cruised the bay and watered at Guanaxa. Elizabethan sea dogs are thought to have first made their way to Yucatan's south-eastern shores in late 1577 to early 1578, when some 60 British pirates sacked Bacalar, a deed attributed either to Francisco de Acles or John Barker. Once begun, British piracy in the bay extended to the 17th century more or less unabated, becoming infrequent only by the early 18th century.

=== Smuggling ===
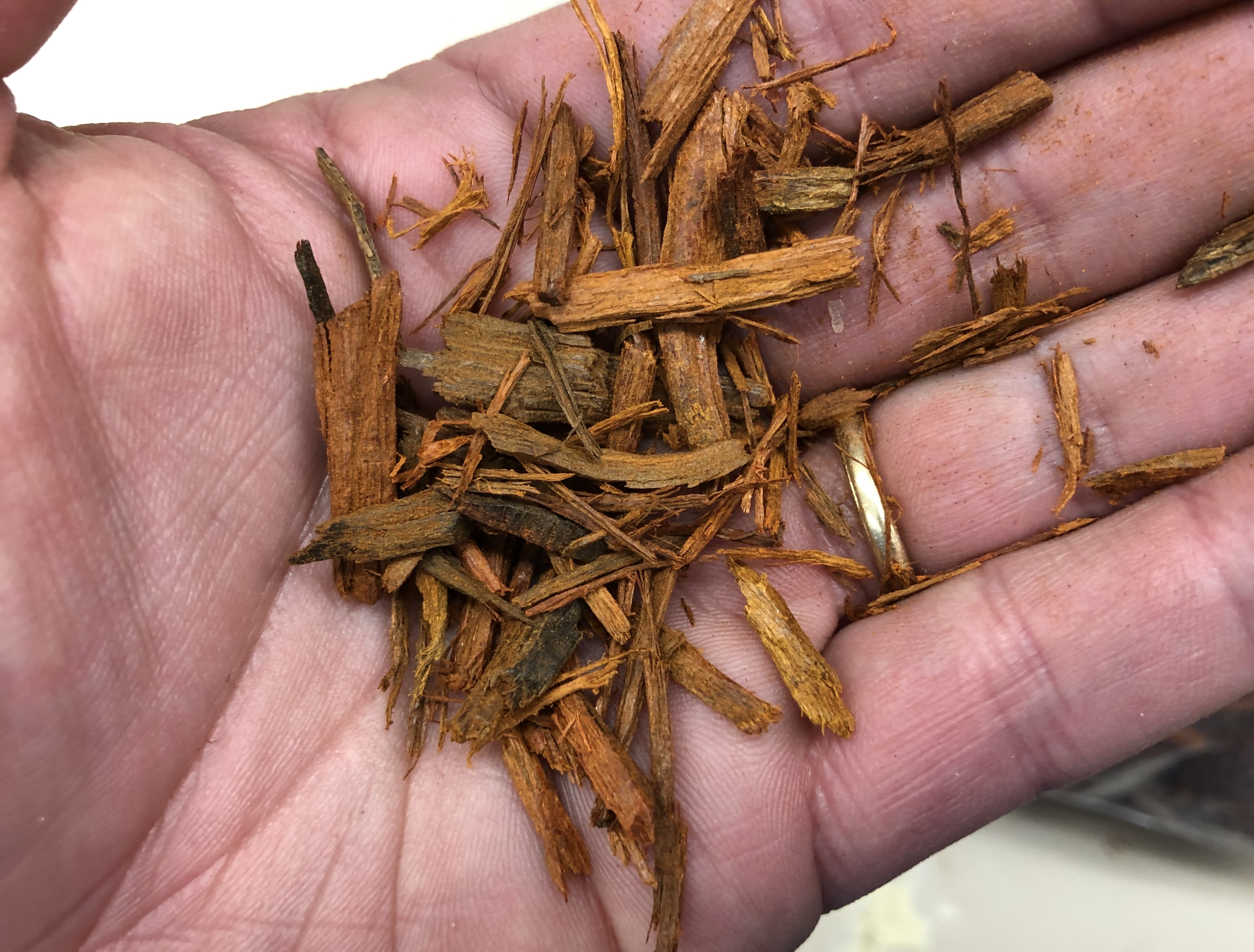
Chipped logwood, a coveted dyestuff for clothing in the 17th century

The arrival and continued presence of pirates in the Bay of Honduras afforded Spanish merchants the opportunity to evade duties and taxes on the purchase and sale of goods at port. British and Dutch vessels were especially noted for being keen on this surreptitious trade. Spanish demand for smuggling in the bay is thought to have been paltry up to the 1620s though. According to Murdo J. MacLeod, "the situation altered significantly after 1630 as it became obvious that the flota system was decaying and the Spanish economy declining". In the 1630s and ensuing decades, then, official flota vessels became ever more infrequent in the bay, thus forcing Spanish merchants into increasing dependence on British and Dutch pirates to dispose of their goods. By the middle and late 17th century, smuggling in the bay had become "sporadic but fairly frequent", especially in indigo and logwood (for textile dyeing), "large quantities" of which found their way to British and Dutch markets without first entering Iberian ports, despite Spain's formal monopoly of said commodities.

Logwood, native to Yucatan and first used to dye textiles by the Maya, was recognised as a valuable good and so monopolised by the Spanish in the late 16th century, when the encomendero Marcos de Ayala Trujeque of Valladolid began cutting and shipping it in 1562. By the 1570s, Spain was receiving an annual average of some 200 tonnes of logwood from Spanish Yucatan, principally shipped from Campeche. The booming market is thought to have not long gone unnoticed by British sea dogs, who increasingly sought to loot the exclusive good. The rate and volume of logwood smuggling is, naturally, difficult to quantify, but is thought to have been substantial enough in England to warrant legislation there in the early 1580s. As the Spanish economy declined though, so too did the ready availability (to pirates) of Spanish-cut logwood. But as British demand for the stuff did not abate, pirates were ever more required to cut the logwood themselves. When, where and by whom exactly this was first done is debated, though it is generally thought to have become the norm for British pirates near Yucatan in or by the mid-17th century.

=== Political opposition ===
In the Bay of Honduras and Yucatan, pirates posed a threat to Spanish people and property soon after their first arrival in the mid-16th century. By the mid-17th century, though, they (and others) would additionally threaten the Spanish state itself, by resisting or challenging Spanish claims to exclusive dominion in the region.

As regards Postclassic Maya polities that survived the conquest of Yucatan (most notably the Peten Itza kingdom and neighbours, like the Mopan and Manche Chol territories), these would not accede to Spanish authority until the decisive conquest of Peten in the 1690s. As regards those which did not (annexed by Spanish Yucatan), their former Maya residents would at times successfully defy Spanish rule, as was the case from the 1630s to 1690s for participants of the Tipu rebellion in the southern Bacalar district. Such resistance is thought to have drastically diminished what little power the Spanish had been able to project in the south-western bay.

As elsewhere in the New World, the British likewise challenged Spanish authority in and around the bay (within the western Caribbean). The earliest such instance is most often attributed to British and Dutch pirates who surreptitiously settled in said region (most notably in north-western Hispaniola, including Tortuga) in the early 17th century, thereby becoming buccaneers proper (pirates resident in the Caribbean). The first formal British settlement in the area, though, was Old Providence, off the Mosquito Shore (Miskito territory then). The proprietary colony was chartered in 1630, but the coast and islands had been frequented by pirates since the 1610s or earlier. In 1631, Old Providence made Anthony Hilton's settlement in Tortuga a dependency of theirs. In 1633, they had Sussex Camock establish a mainland outpost on Cape Gracias a Dios for trade with the Miskito. By 29 January 1636, they were granted letters of reprisal against the Spanish, and despatched privateers from May 1636 to July 1638. On 8 June 1638, they granted William Claiborne letters patent to settle Rattan. The Spanish captured the colony on 17 May 1641, but some residents may have sought refuge in Gracias a Dios or Rattan.

== Founding ==
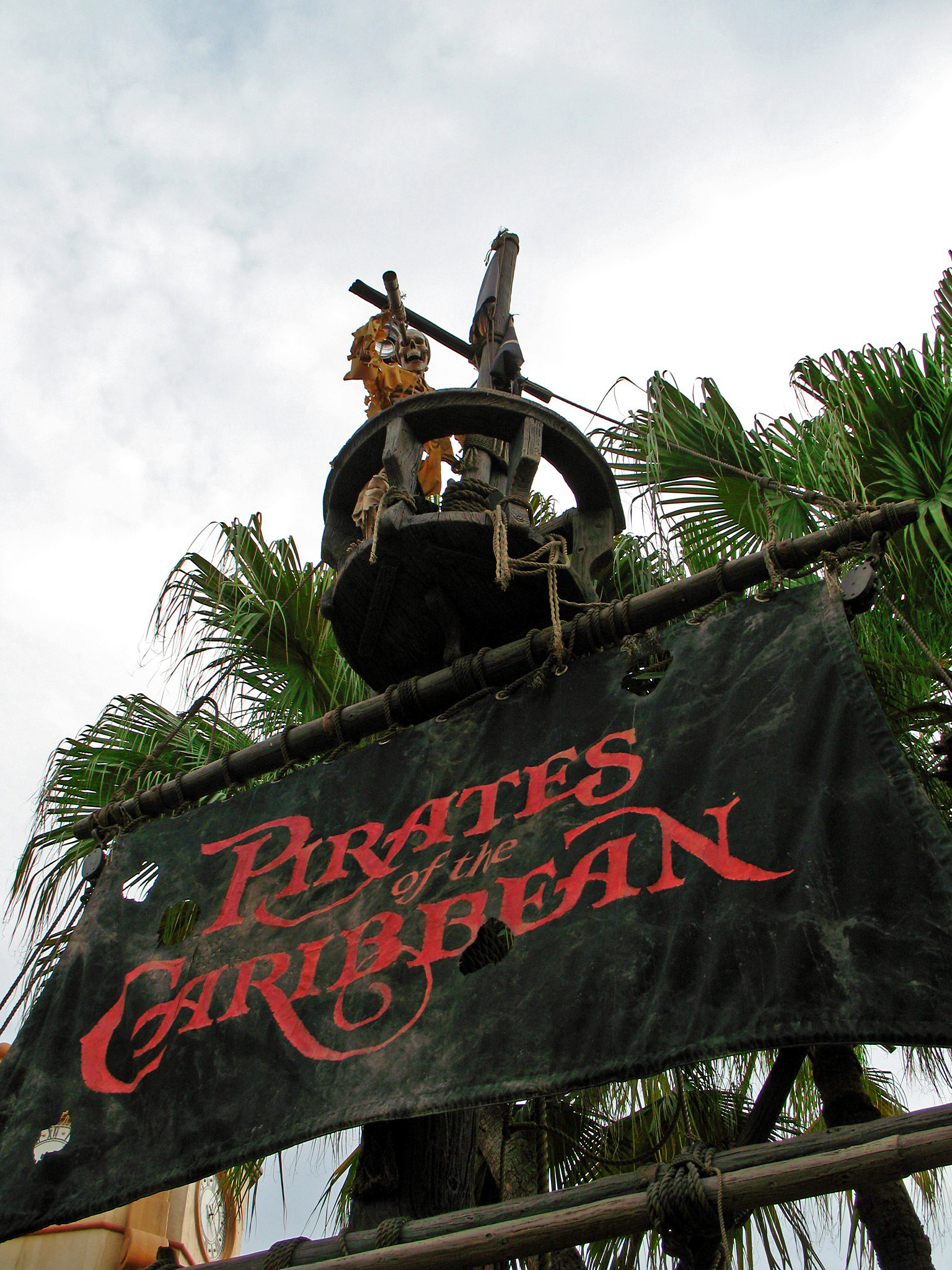
As with pirates in general (popular example pictured), historical facts regarding Belize's founding have been shrouded in myths and legends

The Bay settlement is traditionally said to have been founded by British buccaneers in the 17th century. According to Boston University archaeologist Daniel R. Finamore, "the romantic but commonly held view of the history of Belize begins with a haven of free-spirited and adventuresome pirates occasionally sneaking out of hiding amid the cayes and reef system to perform piratical acts of independence against Britain's economic oppression and Spain's cultural conceit. They eventually become attached to the place so they find legitimate livelihoods, prosper, form a government, and are eventually rewarded with the status of a colony of the British Empire".

This general account is sometimes further specified, most often by identifying the founding Baymen's captain as Peter Wallace, naming their ship (the Swallow), tallying their number (circa 80 men), locating the site of their landing (near the mouth of the Belize River), or dating their arrival (to 1638). Versions of both the general and specific accounts remain common in lay literature on Belize, and in the country's popular culture. The latter, however, are now deemed founding myths by historians, as no primary sources for such particular details have been identified.

=== In scholarship ===
Like their brethren the buccaneers, early Baymen are not thought to have been assiduous record-keepers, leaving historians with scarce few primary sources on the Bay settlement in the 17th and 18th centuries. As said gap in the historical record has been filled with local myths and legends, the work of distinguishing fact from fiction has become a vexing proposition, leading some scholars to characterise the problem of Belize's founding as intractable. According to Amherst College historian Mavis C. Campbell, "when, then, did the British begin to settle in the part of Yucatan we call Belize today? This is an even more stubborn question than that of Spanish settlement of the territory, and we will probably never be able to answer it precisely. We may have to rely on Sir Harry Luke's proposition that 'as a British Colony British Honduras, like Topsy, never was born but just grow'd.' This is in contrast to the more regularly established British colonies in the region, which were acquired either by royal patents or by conquest and settlement". According to London University historians Barbara and Victor Bulmer-Thomas, "all Caribbean countries, with one exception, can document the date of first permanent settlement by Europeans with some accuracy ... The one exception is Belize, whose British origins have been shrouded in a mixture of fact, myth, legend, naivety and dishonesty ... we will never know with certainty who the first settlers were [but there is] a certain justice in this, however, since we will also never know who were the first Palaeo-Indians or Maya in Belize".

Nevertheless, the aforementioned general account (British buccaneers in the 17th century) does enjoy widespread support in current scholarship. Most often, contemporary historians date the founding to some decades within the mid-century (1630s to 1670s), locate the event to the mouth of the Belize River or thereabouts, and propose that the founding Baymen sought a haven, logwood, or had been shipwrecked.

==== Historical ====
Accounts of the Bay settlement's founding were first proffered in literature in the 18th century. In the ensuing centuries, dozens of competing theories arose in anglophone and Hispanic historical literature on Belize. The following table lists these.

List of historical and modern theories of Belize's founding.
Date	Founding	Pub. (Note: Date of first publication.)
In 1603 to 1604	Wallace in six ships set off from London on 14 May 1603, landed at the Rio Viejo in about early 1604, around when Santo Tomas de Castilla was discovered and the Honduran flotilla (Note: Ships in the Spanish treasure fleet with ports of call in the Bay of Honduras.) established, and fixed his settlement there	1925
In circa 1610	Wallace and adventurers tried to establish themselves in Balize in around 1610	1872
By 1618 or 1641	British logwood cutters were present on the New or upper Belize rivers by the time when Fuensalida (Note: Bartolomé Fuensalida, a Franciscan friar.) journeyed there in 1618 and 1641	1957
In 1617	Wallace installed himself in Belize in 1617	1925
In circa 1617 to circa 1652	English logwood cutters, settled on the River of Valis, possessed themselves of the New and Hondo rivers when Bacalar was twice sacked and ruined, built many houses and huts, employed many slaves to cut logwood, and shipped it to Jamaica and Europe	1732
In 1631 to 1633	Old Providence colonists established themselves in the foot of the Cockscomb Mountains to cultivate the fresh soil, upon finding the Tortuga too small and exposed in 1631, and were joined by Camock in mid-1633, who sought silk-grass and trade with the Miskito	1946
In mid-17th century	Wallace sought to fix himself a permanent lair towards the mid-17th century, and as Bacalar had been annihilated by Abraham's (Note: Unidentified; possibly Abraham Blauvelt.) depradations (in 1648 and 1652) and the Indian uprising, (Note: Likely the Tipu rebellion.) he diligently reconnoitred its waters, found a suitable site (Belize), landed with some 80 pirates, built a few huts and a rude fort, and settled there	1849
By 1670	Europeans settled the Honduran coast in some uncertain date (after its 1502 discovery by Columbus), after which the country was transferred to England by treaty (Note: The Godolphin Treaty.) in 1670	1841
In 1633 to 1700	Pirates or wood cutters founded Belize in the middle or last third of the 17th century, as by the latter third, there was already a nest of them there	1878
In 1638	A few British subjects inhabited Honduras after being wrecked on the coast in 1638	1829
In 1638	Wallace and buccaneers infested the Honduran sea and discovered the mouth of the River Belize in 1638	1827
In 1640	Wallace and West Indian flibustiers settled Belize upon being driven to the coast by shipwreck in 1640	1872
In 1642 to 1658	The English began using Honduras as a place of refuge and concealment from the time of Cromwell's administration	1826
In 1642 to 1680	British pirates permanently occupied the cayes for piracy only after Bacalar and Truxillo were sacked in 1642, and settled the mainland to cut logwood in the 1670s and by 1680, after England agreed to end privateering and suppress piracy in 1667 and 1670, and only after Catoche (Note: A 17th century logwood stand by British buccaneers in Cape Catoche.) was depleted	2016
In 1650s to early 1680s	English logwood cutters were settled in Belize by the early 1680s, when Coxon's crew mutinied, though archaeology does not corroborate semi-permanent settlement in the first half of the 17th century	1994
In 1655 to 1700	Jamaican adventurers stationed themselves in Honduras to cut logwood, after first depleting Catoche and Trist, (Note: Also Tris, Terminos, Campeachy. A 17th century logwood stand by British buccaneers in the isles (like Trist) or shores of Lake Terminos, in the Bay of Campeachy.) whereupon Honduras became their main establishment despite more than a century of Spanish opposition, which was ended by the last war (Note: The Anglo-Spanish War of the 1760s.)	1777
In circa 1663	Wallace and a group of Scots settled on the Belize River to cut logwood around 1663	2010
In 1662 to 1670	Wallace established Valis (a permanent, furtive plantation or logwood stand) on Rio Viejo before 1670, by about the time when flibustiers were cutting in Trist, and after cutting in Catoche began in 1662	1944
In 1662 to 1701	English filibusters planted their main logwood-cutting establishment in Belize after Catoche and Trist were depleted, within some decades of when cutting in Catoche began in around 1662	1878
In circa 1667	Wallace and English pirates settled Belize shortly after the treaty (Note: The Earl of Sandwich's Treaty.) with Spain in 1667	1877
In 1666 to 1699	Pirates or wood cutters sheltered in Belize in the last third of the 17th century, by the time when Villagutierre y Sotomayor (Note: Juan de Villagutierre, a cronista de Indias.) wrote his history in 1699	1878
In early 18th century	English flibustiers forsook piracy and began an apparently honest trade in the dyewood-rich region between the Balize and Hondo rivers in the beginning of the 18th century	1864
In 1717	Walasse and English dyewood cutters took possession of the southern end of Yucatan, beyond the Hondo, in 1717, upon being evicted from Terminos in late 1716	1871

== Aftermath ==
The UK Foreign Office mediate a round table by Belizean and Guatemalan diplomats on their border dispute in 2012

The Bay settlement's surreptitious founding was soon deemed illicit by the British and the Spanish, both of whom attempted to dissuade or outright force the Baymen to abandon their post. The former were not especially diligent in their efforts, though, and eventually recognised the settlement as the charter colony of British Honduras in 1862. The Spanish were quite keen to uproot the settlement, and managed to do so a number of times in the 18th century, but ultimately failed to put a permanent stop to it before Spanish American independence. The newly-sovereign states around the settlement saw themselves as inheriting Spanish claims to the latter, though, leading to centuries of frosty relations and unresolved territorial disputes, some of which continue to the present day (with the Guatemalan and Honduran republics).

The settlement (alongside piracy and logging) also immediately displaced the pre-existing Maya population, and led to their forcible removal altogether during Spanish reducciones which stretched into the 18th century.

== See also ==
- Piracy in the Bay of Honduras

== Notes and references ==
=== References ===
==== Serials ====
1. A (6 May 2011). "Ideas and Opinions – To the ICJ or not". Amandala. No. xxx. Belize City. pp. xxx.
2. F (5 September 1849). "OJEADA sobre el establecimiento británico de BELICE y reflexiones sobre su futura influencia". Fénix. No. 62. Campeche, Camp.: Por Gregorio Buenfil. pp. 3–4.
3. HA (1826). The Honduras almanack, for the year of our Lord 1826 ... : Calculated to the meridian of Belize. Belize: Published by Authority of the Magistrates. OCLC 950944267.
4. HA (1827). The Honduras almanack, for the year of our Lord 1827 ... : Calculated to the meridian of Belize. Belize: Published by Authority of the Magistrates. OCLC 950947887.
5. HA (1828). The Honduras almanack, for the year of our Lord 1828 ... : Calculated to the meridian of Belize. Belize: Published by Authority of the Magistrates. OCLC 266074037.
6. HA (1829). The Honduras almanack, for the year of our Lord 1829 ... : Calculated to the meridian of Belize. Belize: Published by Authority of the Legislative Assembly. hdl:2027/nnc1.cu56617763. OCLC 682190774.
7. HA (1830). The Honduras almanack, for the year of our Lord 1830 ... : Calculated to the meridian of Belize. Belize: Published by Authority of the Legislative Assembly. OCLC 266074037.
8. HA (1832). The Honduras almanack, for the year of our Lord 1828 ... : Calculated to the meridian of Belize. Belize: Published by Authority of the Legislative Assembly. OCLC 266074037.
9. HA (1839). The Honduras almanack, for the year of our Lord 1839 ... : Calculated to the meridian of Belize. Belize: Printed and Published by Henry Whitney. OCLC 266074037.
10. RWJ (27 May 1732). "Extract of a Letter from Campeche in the Province of Yucatan, dated Nov. 24". Read's Weekly Journal Or British Gazetteer. No. 375. London: Printed for J. Read, in White-Fryers, Fleet-street. p. 3.
11. WR (11 November 1828). "Honduras (From the Honduras Almanack for 1826.)". The Weekly Register. Vol. XV, no. 759. St. John's, Antigua & Barbuda: Loving & Hill. p. 4.

==== Theses ====
1. De la O Torres, Rodrigo Alejandro (November 2014). DE CORSARIOS, MARES Y COSTAS: EL CORSO EN LA CONSTRUCCIÓN DEL ESPACIO GOLFO-CARIBE. 1527-1620 (PhD). Mérida, Yuc.: Centro de Investigaciones y Estudios Superiores en Antropología Social.
2. Finamore, Daniel (1994). Sailors and slaves on the wood-cutting frontier : archaeology of the British Bay settlement, Belize (PhD). Boston, Mass.: University of Boston. OCLC 33382653. ProQuest 304114781.
3. Genkins, Daniel (10 August 2018). Entangled Empires: Anglo-Spanish Competition in the Seventeenth-Century Caribbean (PhD). Nashville, TN: Vanderbilt University. OCLC 1103506045.
4. Marcus, Linda C. (1990). English influence on Belize and the Peten region of northern Guatemala, 1630 to 1763 (PhD). Dallas, Tex.: Southern Methodist University. OCLC 48275365. ProQuest 303887067.
5. McJunkin, David Morgan (1991). Logwood : An inquiry into the historical biogeography of Haematoxylum campechianum L. and related dyewoods of the neotropics (PhD). Los Angeles, Calif.: University of California. OCLC 24057056. ProQuest 303932948.
6. Mihok, Lorena Diane (2013). Unearthing Augusta: Landscapes of Royalization on Roatan Island, Honduras (PhD). Tampa, Fl.: University of South Florida.
7. Rushton, Elizabeth Anne Cecilia (December 2014). 'Under the shade I flourish' : An environmental history of northern Belize over the last three thousand five hundred years (PhD). Nottingham, Eng.: University of Nottingham.
8. Vazquez Barke, Gabriela (August 2012). BACALAR EN EL SIGLO XVII: colonización y resistencia (MA). Merida, Yuc.: Centro de Investigaciones y Estudios Superiores en Antropología Social.

==== Journals ====
1. Aliphat Fernández, Mario M.; Caso Barrera, Laura (2013). "La construcción histórica de las Tierras Bajas Mayas del Sur por medio de mapas esquemáticos". Historia Mexicana. 63 (2): 839–875.
2. Avery, W. L. (1900). "British Honduras". Journal of the American Geographical Society of New York. 32 (4): 331–333. doi:10.2307/197063. JSTOR 197063.
3. Azpiroz, Manuel, ed. (23 March 1871). "Establecimiento inglés de Belice". Boletín de la Sociedad de Geografía y Estadística de la República Mexicana. 2. 4: 698–715.
4. Barbour, Violet (April 1911). "Privateers and Pirates of the West Indies". The American Historical Review. 16 (3): 529–566. doi:10.2307/1834836. JSTOR 1834836.
5. Bialuschewski, Arne (2017). "Slaves of the Buccaneers: Mayas in Captivity in the Second Half of the Seventeenth Century". Ethnohistory. 64 (1): 41–63. doi:10.1215/00141801-3688359.
6. Bialuschewski, Arne (2020). "Juan Gallardo: A Native American Buccaneer". Hispanic American Historical Review. 100 (2): 233–256. doi:10.1215/00182168-8178200. S2CID 218799883.
7. Bulmer-Thomas, Victor; Bulmer-Thomas, Barbara (19 November 2016). "The Origins of the Belize Settlement". Tempus (4): 137–160. ISSN 2422-2178.
8. Carillo y Ancona, Crescencio (9 November 1878). "El orígen de Belice". Boletín de la Sociedad de Geografía y Estadística de la República Mexicana. 3. 4: 254–264. hdl:2027/mdp.39015008360342.
9. Craig, Alan K. (April 1969). "Logwood as a Factor in the Settlement of British Honduras". Caribbean Studies. 9 (1): 53–62. JSTOR 25612108.
10. Curry, Jr., Herbert F. (July 1956). "British Honduras: From Public Meeting to Crown Colony". The Americas. 13 (1): 31–42. doi:10.2307/979212. JSTOR 979212. S2CID 143843148.
11. De la O Torres, Rodrigo Alejandro (January–June 2016). "La presencia de corsarios franceses en el Golfo-Caribe entre 1536-1566 : una propuesta de análisis espacial". Historia 2.0: Conocimiento Histórico en Clave Digital. 6 (11): 36–56. ISSN 2027-9035.
12. De la O Torres, Rodrigo Alejandro (July–December 2019). "Miedos y fenómeno de la piratería en el Golfo-Caribe durante el siglo XVI. Un ensayo de aproximación" (PDF). Historelo revista de historia regional y local. 11 (2): 267–300. doi:10.15446/historelo.v11n22.73263. ISSN 2145-132X. S2CID 198778698.
13. Grunewald, Donald (July 1965). "The Anglo-Guatemalan Dispute over British Honduras". Caribbean Studies. 5 (2): 17–44. JSTOR 25611880.
14. Obando Andrade, Rafael (2016). "Zambos y negros de La Taguzgalpa: actores claves en el contrabando centroamericano. 1642-1715". Revista cuadernos del Caribe. 13 (21): 7–20.
15. Offen, Karl H. (April 2011). "Puritan Bioprospecting in Central America and the West Indies". Itinerario. 35 (1): 15–47. doi:10.1017/S0165115311000040. OCLC 776016944. S2CID 164165627.
16. Peniche, Manuel (1869). "Historia de las relaciones de España y México con Inglaterra, sobre el establecimiento de Belice". Boletín de la Sociedad de Geografía y Estadística de la República Mexicana. 2. 1: 217–256, 377–403.
17. Reichert, Rafal (2017). "El golfo de Honduras: estrategias geopolíticas y militares de una frontera imperial, siglos XVI-XVIII". Tzintzun revista de estudios históricos. 65: 9–40.
18. Swayne, Eric (September 1917). "British Honduras". The Geographical Journal. 50 (3): 161–175. Bibcode:1917GeogJ..50..161S. doi:10.2307/1779904. JSTOR 1779904.
19. Temple, Robert (16 January 1857). "On British Honduras, its History, Trade, and Natural Resources". Journal of the Society of Arts. 5 (217): 113–130. JSTOR 41323634.
20. Temple, Robert (11 June 1858). "British Honduras". Journal of the Society of Arts. 6 (290): 465–471. JSTOR 41323666.
21. Temple, Robert (18 June 1858). "British Honduras". Journal of the Society of Arts. 6 (291): 484–489. JSTOR 41323667.
22. Zahedieh, Nuala (1986). "Trade, Plunder, and Economic Development in Early English Jamaica, 1655-89". Economic History Review. 39 (2): 205–222. doi:10.2307/2596150. JSTOR 2596150.

==== Print ====
1. Ancona, Eligio (1878). Historia de Yucatan desde la època mas remota hasta nuestros dias. Vol. 2 (1st ed.). Mérida, Yucatán: Imprenta de M. Heredia Argüelles. OCLC 13550373.
2. Andrews, Kenneth R., ed. (1958). English privateering voyages to the West Indies, 1588-1595 : documents relating to English voyages to the West Indies from the defeat of the armada to the last voyage of Sir Francis Drake. Works issued by the Hakluyt Society; 2nd ser., no. 111 (1st ed.). Cambridge: Published for the Hakluyt Society at the University Press. hdl:2027/mdp.39015026881832. OCLC 504851.
3. Asturias, Francisco (1925). Belice (1st ed.). Guatemala: Sociedad de Geografía é Historia de Guatemala. hdl:2027/txu.059173022907279. OCLC 10046866.
4. Asturias, Francisco (1941). Belice. Revista de la Facultad de Ciencias Jurídicas y Sociales de Guatemala. Vol. 2. No. 1 Suplemento (Expanded 2nd ed.). Guatemala: Tipografía Nacional de Guatemala. hdl:2027/uc1.$b639954. OCLC 1987689.
5. Bancroft, Hubert Howe (1883). History of Central America. Vol. II. 1530–1800. The Works of Hubert Howe Bancroft. Vol. 7 (1st ed.). San Francisco: A. L. Bancroft & Co. OCLC 21601728.
6. Bolland, Nigel Orlando (1977). Formation of a Colonial Society. Johns Hopkins studies in Atlantic history and culture (1st ed.). Baltimore, Mar.: Johns Hopkins University Press. ISBN 9780801818875. OCLC 2614187.
7. Brandow, James C.; Hotten, John Camden, eds. (1982). Omitted chapters from Hotten's original lists of persons of quality and others who went from Great Britain to the American plantations, 1600-1700: census returns, parish registers, and militia rolls from the Barbados census of 1679/80 (1st ed.). Baltimore: Genealogical Publishing Co. OCLC 8533128.
8. Bridges, George Wilson (1828). The annals of Jamaica. Vol. 2 (1st ed.). London: John Murray. OCLC 4612281.
9. Bristowe, Lindsay W.; Wright, Philip (1888). The Handbook of British Honduras for 1888-89 : Comprising Historical, Statistical, and General Information Concerning the Colony, Compiled from Official and Other Reliable Records (1st ed.). Edinburgh & London: William Blackwood & Sons. OCLC 271773478.
10. Brockhaus, Friedrich Arnold (1864). Bd. 2. Arago bis Belgrad. Allgemeine deutsche Real-Encyklopädie für die gebildeten Stände : Conversations-Lexikon. Vol. 2 (Revised, expanded 11th ed.). Leipzig: F.A. Brockhaus. OCLC 39355449. Archived from the original on 18 June 2021.
11. Burdon, John Alder (1927). Brief Sketch of British Honduras (1st ed.). London: The West India Committee. OCLC 11423776.
12. Burdon, John Alder (1931). Archives of British Honduras ... : being extracts and précis from records, with maps. Vol. 1 (1st ed.). London: Sifton, Praed & Co. OCLC 3046003.
13. Calderón Quijano, José Antonio (1944). Belice 1663 (?)-1821. Publicaciones de la Escuela de Estudios Hispano-Americanos de la Universidad de Sevilla. Vol. 5 (1st ed.). Seville: Escuela de Estudios Hispano-Americanos. OCLC 2481064.
14. Campbell, Mavis C. (2011). Becoming Belize: A History of an Outpost of Empire Searching for Identity, 1528-1823 (1st ed.). Kingston, Jamaica: University of the West Indies Press. ISBN 9789766402464.
15. Cárdenas Valencia, Francisco de (1937). Relación historial eclesiástica de la provincia de Yucatán de la Nueva España, escrita el año de 1639. Biblioteca histórica mexicana de obras inéditas. Vol. 3 (1st ed.). Mexico City: Antigua Librería Robredo, J. Porrúa e Hijos. OCLC 4660610.
16. Cardona Amaya, José Manuel (2020). Invasiones de corsarios a la Honduras de Felipe IV (1633-1643) (1st ed.). Tegucigalpa: Universidad Nacional Autónoma de Honduras. OCLC 1192967317.
17. Carillo y Ancona, Crescencio (1871). Compendio de la historia de Yucatan; precedido del de su geografía y dispuesto en forma de lecciones (1st ed.). Merida, Yuc.: J.D. Espinosa é hijos. OCLC 13403072.
18. Chamberlain, Robert Stoner (1948). The conquest and colonization of Yucatan, 1517–1550. Carnegie Institution of Washington Publication. Vol. 582 (1st ed.). Washington, DC: Carnegie Institution of Washington. hdl:2027/txu.059173008409431.
19. Chamberlain, Robert Stoner (1953). The conquest and colonization of Honduras, 1502–1550. Carnegie Institution of Washington Publication. Vol. 598 (1st ed.). Washington, DC: Carnegie Institution of Washington. hdl:2027/mdp.39015014261187.
20. Chamberlain, Robert Stoner (1966) [First published 1953 as Carnegie Publication 598]. The conquest and colonization of Honduras, 1502–1550. Carnegie Institution of Washington publicationno. 598 (Reprint of 1st ed.). New York: Octagon Books. hdl:2027/txu.059173002179226.
21. Coxe, William (1815). Memoirs of the kings of Spain of the House of Bourbon, from the accession of Philip V. to the death of Charles III. 1700 to 1788. Drawn from the original and unpublished documents. Vol. 3 (2nd ed.). London: Longman, Hurst, Rees, Orme, and Brown. OCLC 579462139.
22. Dampier, William (1700) [First published 1699]. Voyages and descriptions, in three parts : to which is added a general index to both volumes. Vol. 2 (2nd ed.). Printed for James Knapton, at the Crown in St Paul's Church-yard. OCLC 8648162. ProQuest 2264207852.
23. Davidson, William V. (1974). Historical geography of the Bay Islands, Honduras : Anglo-Hispanic conflict in the western Caribbean (1st ed.). Birmingham, Ala.: Southern University Press. hdl:2027/txu.059173001361450. OCLC 1177197.
24. De la O Torres, Rodrigo Alejandro (2020). DE CORSARIOS, MARES Y COSTAS : El corso en la construcción del espacio y experiencias marítimas en el Golfo-Caribe, 1527-1620 (1st ed.). Ciudad Universitaria, Aguascalientes: Universidad Autónoma de Aguascalientes. OCLC 1280054563.
25. Donohoe, William Arlington (1946). A History of British Honduras (1st ed.). Montreal: Provincial Publishing Co. OCLC 1666407.
26. Egli, Johann Jacob (1872). Nomina geographica Versuch einer allgemeinen geographischen onomatologie. Leipzig: Friedrich Brandstetter. OCLC 41195468.
27. Fancourt, Charles St. John (1854). The history of Yucatan : from its discovery to the close of the seventeenth century (1st ed.). London: John Murray. OCLC 1908914.
28. Figueroa, Alejandro J.; Johnson, Erlend; Goodwin, Whitney A., eds. (2021). Southeastern Mesoamerica : indigenous interaction, resilience, and change (1st ed.). Louisville, Colorado: University Press of Colorado. OCLC 1226797442.
29. García Paláez, Francisco de Paula (1852a). Tomo Segundo. Memorias para la historia del antiguo reyno de Guatemala. Vol. 2 (1st ed.). Guatemala City: Establecimiento tip. de L. Luna. OCLC 7838896.
30. García Paláez, Francisco de Paula (1852b). Tomo Tercero. Memorias para la historia del antiguo reyno de Guatemala. Vol. 3 (1st ed.). Guatemala City: Establecimiento tip. de L. Luna. OCLC 7838896.
31. Gerhard, Peter (1979). The Southeast Frontier of New Spain (1st ed.). Princeton, NJ: Princeton University Press. OCLC 4529742.
32. Gibbs, Archibald Robertson (1883). British Honduras: an historical and descriptive account of the colony from its settlement, 1670 (1st ed.). London: Sampson Low, Marston, Searle, & Rivington. OCLC 608881763.
33. González Díaz, Falia; Lázaro de la Escosura, Pilar (2010). Mare clausum mare liberum : la pirateria en la América española (1st ed.). Madrid: Ministerio de Cultura. ISBN 9788481814330. OCLC 609110024.
34. Green, Mary Anne Everett, ed. (1858). Calendar of State Papers Domestic: James I, 1619-23 (1st ed.). London: Her Majesty's Stationery Office.
35. Green, Mary Anne Everett, ed. (1861). Calendar of State Papers Domestic: Charles II, 1661-2 (1st ed.). London: Her Majesty's Stationery Office.
36. Gregg, Algar Robert (1968). British Honduras. The Corona Library (1st ed.). London: Her Majesty's Stationery Office. OCLC 465800813.
37. Griffith, William J.; Alford, Alfred E.; Bolland, Orlando N. (10 January 2022). "Belize". Encyclopaedia Britannica.
38. Hakluyt, Richard, ed. (1589). The principal nauigations, voiages, traffiques and discoueries of the English nation made by sea or ouer-land, to the remote and farthest distant quarters of the earth, at any time within the compasse of these 1500. yeeres: deuided into three seuerall volumes, according to the positions of the regions, whereunto they were directed (1st ed.). London: By George Bishop and Ralph Newberie, deputies to Christopher Barker, printer to the Queenes most excellent Maiestie. ProQuest 2248608847.
39. Hakluyt, Richard, ed. (1600). The principal nauigations, voiages, traffiques and discoueries of the English nation made by sea or ouer-land, to the remote and farthest distant quarters of the earth, at any time within the compasse of these 1500. yeeres: deuided into three seuerall volumes, according to the positions of the regions, whereunto they were directed. Vol. 3 (2nd expanded ed.). London: George Bishop, Ralfe Newberie, & Robert Barker. OCLC 252871354. ProQuest 2248550788.
40. Hotten, John Camden, ed. (1874). The original lists of persons of quality; emigrants; religious exiles; political rebels; serving men sold for a term of years; apprentices; children stolen; maidens pressed; and others who went from Great Britain to the American plantations 1600-1700 (1st ed.). London: John Camden Hotten. OCLC 919996346.
41. Humphreys, R. A. (1961). The Diplomatic History of British Honduras, 1638-1901 (1st ed.). London: Oxford University Press. OCLC 484695.
42. Ibarra Rojas, Eugenia (2011). Del arco y la flecha a las armas de fuego : los indios mosquitos y la historia centroamericana 1633-1786 (1st ed.). San José, Costa Rica: Editorial UCR. ISBN 9789968462662. OCLC 757112879.
43. Iyo, Joe; Tzalam, Froyla; Humphreys, Francis (2007). Belize, a new vision : African and Maya civilizations, the heritage of a new nation (1st ed.). Belize City: Factory Books. OCLC 434752360.
44. Jones, Grant D. (1989). Maya resistance to Spanish rule: time and history on a colonial frontier (1st ed.). Albuquerque, New Mex.: University of New Mexico Press. ISBN 082631161X. OCLC 20012099.
45. Kinsbruner, Jay; Langer, Erick Detlef, eds. (2008). "Wallace, Peter". Encyclopedia of Latin American History and Culture. Vol. 6 (2nd ed.). Detroit: Cengage.
46. Kupperman, Karen Ordahl (1993). Providence Island, 1630-1641 (1st ed.). Cambridge: Cambridge University Press. hdl:2027/heb.00270. ISBN 0521352053. OCLC 958556236.
47. Laughton, J. K. (23 September 2004). "Barker, Andrew". Oxford Dictionary of National Biography (online ed.). Oxford University Press. doi:10.1093/ref:odnb/1387. (Subscription, Wikipedia Library access or UK public library membership required.)
48. Lauterpacht, Elihu; Schwebel, Stephen; Rosenne, Shabtai; Orrego Vicuña, Francisco (November 2001). Legal Opinion on Guatemala's Territorial Claim to Belize (PDF). Belmopan: Government Printer. Archived from the original (PDF) on 14 June 2022.
49. Levy, Pablo (1873) [First published 1871 in French]. Notas geográficas y económicas sobre la República de Nicaragua (Translation of 1st ed.). Paris: E. Denné Schmitz. OCLC 2309283.
50. López de Cogolludo, Diego (1688). Historia de Yucathan (1st ed.). Madrid: Por Jvan Garcia Infanzen. OCLC 85799316.
51. Luján Muñoz, Jorge (2005) [First published 1994]. Historia general de Guatemala. Vol. 2 (Reprint of 1st ed.). Guatemala City: Asociación de Amigos del País & Fundación para la Cultura y el Desarollo. OCLC 499047798. Archived from the original on 24 February 2023.
52. MacLeod, Murdo J. (1973). Spanish Central America: A Socioeconomic History, 1520–1720. Campus. Vol. 119 (1st ed.). Berkeley, CA: University of California Press. ISBN 0520021371. OCLC 762163.
53. Marley, David F. (2008) [First published 1998]. Wars of the Americas: a chronology of armed conflict in the New World, 1492 to the present. Vol. 1 (2nd expanded ed.). Santa Barbara, CA: ABC-CLIO. OCLC 180907562.
54. McCulloch, John Ramsay (1841). A Dictionary, Geographical, Statistical, and Historical, Of the Various Countries, Places and Principal Natural Objects in the World. Vol. 1. London: Longman, Orme, Brown, Green and Longmans. OCLC 65264879.
55. McCulloch, John Ramsay (1866). A Dictionary, Geographical, Statistical, and Historical, Of the Various Countries, Places and Principal Natural Objects in the World. Vol. 2 (New Rev. ed.). London: Longmans, Green, and Co. OCLC 890743491.
56. Metzgen, Monrad Sigfrid; Cain, Henry Conrad (1925). The handbook of British Honduras, comprising historical, statistical and general information concerning the colony (1st ed.). London: West India Committee. OCLC 5319621.
57. Molina Solís, Juan Francisco (1910). Historia de Yucatán durante la dominación española. Vol. 2 (1st ed.). Merida, Yuc.: Impr. de la Loteria del estado. OCLC 13381125.
58. Morris, Daniel (1883). The Colony of British Honduras, its Resources and Prospects; with Particular Reference to its Indigenous Plants and Economic Productions (1st ed.). London: Edward Stanford. OCLC 3082083.
59. Naylor, Robert A. (1989). Penny ante imperialism : the Mosquito Shore and the Bay of Honduras, 1600-1914 : a case study in British informal empire (1st ed.). Rutherford, NJ; London: Fairleigh Dickinson University Press; Associated University Presses. hdl:2027/txu.059173018680090. ISBN 0838633234. OCLC 17505939.
60. Newton, Arthur Percival (1914). The colonising activities of the English Puritans: the last phase of the Elizabethan struggle with Spain. Yale Historical Publications: Miscellany. Vol. 1 (1st ed.). New Haven, CT: Yale University Press. hdl:2027/hvd.32044014678932. OCLC 2993127.
61. Nuñez Ortega, Ángel (1877). Belice, estudio sobre el origen de ese nombre (1st ed.). México, D.F.: Imprenta de Gonzalo A. Esteva. OCLC 680451856.
62. Parsons, James J. (1956). San Andrés and Providencia : English Speaking Islands in the Western Caribbean. University of California Publications in Geography vol. 12 no. 1 (1st ed.). Berkeley and Los Angeles, Calif.: University of California Press. hdl:2027/mdp.39015028783234.
63. Pavía, Lázaro (1888). Los ingleses en Mexico, ó sea, el origen y fundacion de las colonias británicas en el seno mexicano (1st ed.). México, D.F.: Imprenta de Jose V. Castillo.
64. Raithby, John, ed. (1819a). Statutes of the Realm. Vol. 4.
65. Raithby, John, ed. (1819b). Statutes of the Realm. Vol. 5. Great Britain Record Commission.
66. Robertson, William (1777). The History of America. Vol. 2 (1st ed.). Dublin: Printed for Messrs. Whitestone, W. Watson, Corcoran, R. Cross, Sleater, Sheppard, Chamberlaine, Potts, J. Hoey, Flin, Fitzsimons, Exshaw, E. Lynch, S. Watson, W. Colles, Williams, W. Wilson, Porter, Walker, M. Hay, Moncrieffe, Armitage, Hallhead, Faulkner, T. Stewart, Burnet, Vallance, Spotswood, Gilbert, R. Stewart, Mills, Beatty, Jenkin, P. Wilson, E. Cross, Wogan, Macelrath, Higley, Hillary, White, Grueber, M'kenly, and Magee. OCLC 1871683.
67. Roys, Ralph L (1957). The political geography of the Yucatan Maya. Carnegie Institution of Washington Publication 613 (1st ed.). Washington, DC: Carnegie Institution of Washington. hdl:2027/uva.x000422247. OCLC 1851713.
68. Rubio Alpuche, Nestor (1894). Belice : Apuntes historicos y colección de tratados internacionales relativos a esta colonia británica (1st ed.). Merida: Imprenta de "La Revista de Mérida". OCLC 645354630.
69. Sainsbury, W. Noel, ed. (1889). Calendar of State Papers Colonial, America and West Indies. Vol. 7 (1st ed.). London: Her Majesty's Stationery Office.
70. Sloane, H. (1707). A voyage to the islands Madera, Barbados, Nieves, S. Christophers and Jamaica, with the natural history of the Herbs and Trees, Four-Footed Beasts, Fishes, Birds, Insects, Reptiles, &c. of the last of those islands; to which is prefix'd an introduction, wherein is an account of the inhabitants, air, waters, diseases, trade, &c. of that Place, with some Relations concerning the Neighbouring Continent, and Islands of America. Illustrated with the figures of the things describ'd, which have not been heretofore engraved; In large Copper-Plates as big as the Life. Vol. 1 (1st ed.). London: Printed by B.M. for the author.
71. Squier, Ephraim George (1858). The states of Central America : their geography, topography, climate, population, resources, productions, commerce, political organization, aborigines, etc., etc., comprising chapters on Honduras, San Salvador, Nicaragua, Costa Rica, Guatemala, Belize, the Bay Islands, the Mosquito Shore, and the Honduras Inter-Oceanic Railway (1st ed.). New York: Harper & Brothers. OCLC 464354896.
72. Stein, Christian Gottfried Daniel; Hörschelmann, Ferdinand; Wappäus, Johann Eduard (1863–1870). Handbuch der Geographie und Statistik für die gebildeten Stände. Vol. 2 (7th ed.). Leipzig: J.C. Hinrichs'sche Buchhandlung. OCLC 746793168.
73. Stephens, John L. (1841). Incidents of travel in Central America, Chiapas, and Yucatan. Vol. 1 (1st ed.). London: John Murray. hdl:2027/nyp.33433081696803. OCLC 4163910.
74. Ungewitter, Franz Heinrich; Hopf, Georg Wilhelm (1872). Neueste Erdbeschreibung und Staatenkunde, oder geographisch-statistisch-historisches Handbuch : mit besonderer Berücksichtigung der neuesten Gestaltung Deutschlands : in drei Bänden. Vol. 2. Dresden: Gustav Dietze. OCLC 163480536.
75. Uring, Nathaniel (1726). A history of the voyages and travels of Capt. Nathaniel Uring. With new draughts of the Bay of Honduras and the Caribbee Islands; and particularly of St. Lucia, and the Harbour of Petite Carenage; into which Ships may run in bad Weather, and be safe from all Winds and Storms. Very useful for Masters of Ships that use the Leeward Island Trade, or Jamaica (1st ed.). London: Printed by W. Wilkins, for J. Peele. OCLC 85795208.
76. Villagutierre Soto-Mayor, Juan de (1701). Historia de la conquista de la provincia de El Itza, reduccion, y progressos de la de El Lacandon, y otras naciones de indios Barbaros, de la mediacion de el reyno de Guatimala, a las provincias de Yucatan, en la America septentrional (1st ed.). Madrid: En la Imprenta de Lucas Antonio de Bedmar, y Narvaez, portero de camara de Su Magestad, y impressor de los Reynos de Castilla, y Leon, en la Calle de los Preciados. OCLC 79430424.
77. Waight, Larry (2022). "Peter Wallace : "To Be, Or Not To Be"". Belize Hub.
78. Williamson, James A. (1927). Sir John Hawkins : the time and the man (1st ed.). Oxford: Clarendon Press. hdl:2027/mdp.39015027905218. OCLC 3075296.
79. Winzerling, E. O. (1946). Beginning of British Honduras, 1506-1765 (1st ed.). New York: North River Press. OCLC 1892890.
80. Wright, Irene A., ed. (1929). Spanish documents concerning English voyages to the Caribbean, 1527-1568. Works issued by the Hakluyt Society; 2nd ser., no. 62 (1st ed.). London: Printed for the Hakluyt Society. OCLC 2092435.
81. Wright, Irene A., ed. (1932). Documents concerning English voyages to the Spanish main, 1569-1580. Works issued by the Hakluyt Society; 2nd ser., no. 71 (1st ed.). London: Printed for the Hakluyt Society. hdl:2027/mdp.39015012306133. OCLC 1476408.
82. Wright, Irene A., ed. (1951). Further English voyages to Spanish America, 1583-1594 : documents from the Archives of the Indies at Seville illustrating English voyages to the Caribbean, the Spanish Main, Florida, and Virginia. Works issued by the Hakluyt Society; 2nd ser., no. 99 (1st ed.). London: Printed for the Hakluyt Society. hdl:2027/mdp.39015026881790. OCLC 1476734.
