= Baymen =

Earliest European settlers in the future British Honduras

The Baymen were the earliest European settlers with Afro-Jamaicans and Creole-Jamaicans, in the English logging concessions in the Bay of Honduras, Spanish territory that eventually became the colony of British Honduras (modern-day Belize).

== Settlement ==
British logging concessions in the Bay of Honduras, Convention of London 1786

The first Baymen settled in the Belize City area in the 1630s. They were English buccaneers and pirates trying to outrun the Spanish rulers in Mexico and Central America. They found that they could make a living cutting and selling logwood to the home country. Many of the first Baymen settled on what is now the Northside of Belize City governing their settlement through public meetings. In logging they employed enslaved Africans who, while they might be left to their own devices in logging camps, were dependent on their owners for rations and supplies.

The Spanish, who considered the English to be intruders upon their Kingdom of Guatemala, chased out the Baymen four times between 1717 and 1780. Following the 1783 Peace of Paris and 1786 Convention of London, they tolerated the Baymen as logwood concessionaires but on condition that Great Britain evacuate her subjects from the Miskito Coast. London directed Colonel Edward Despard, the newly-appointed Superintendent of the British logwood concessions in the Bay of Honduras (present-day Belize), to accommodate these Shoremen. To the dismay of the Baymen, Despard did so without "any distinction of age, sex, character, respectability, property or colour". He distributed land by lottery in which, the Baymen noted in their petition to London, "the meanest mulatto or free negro has an equal chance". Despard also set aside lands for common use and sought to keep food prices down “for the poorer sort of people”.

To the suggestion from the Home Secretary, Lord Sydney, that it was impolitic to put "affluent settlers and persons of a different description, particularly people of colour" on an "equal footing", Despard replied "the laws of England ... know no such distinction". He characterized the Baymen as an "arbitrary aristocracy", buttressing his argument with the results of the magistracy election in which he won a resounding majority on an unprecedented turnout. Persuaded by the Baymen's entreaty that under "Despard's constitution" the "negroes in servitude, observing the now exalted status of their brethren of yesterday [the free, and now propertied, blacks among the Shoremen] would be induced to revolt, and the settlement must be ruined", in 1790 Sydney's successor, Lord Grenville, recalled Despard to London (where, as a result of his subsequent association with United Irishmen and British republicans, in 1803 he was executed for treason)

The Baymen reluctantly employed slaves against the Spanish in the Battle of St. George's Caye in 1798, but entirely reversed Despard's policies. by the 1820s the settlement had seven legally distinct castes based on skin colour. Great Britain ended slavery in the Bay in 1838. Initially the planters refused to sell land to freedmen. But Belizean slaveowners received the highest compensation, of more than 50 pounds, for selling plots of emancipated territories. Full British sovereignty was finally asserted in 1862, with the territory administered as the Crown colony of British Honduras.

=== Conflict with the Maya ===
The Maya peoples of Belize had suffered from extended conflict over the centuries with the Spanish. Some had retreated to or already occupied the depths of the dense forests of central and western Belize. Buccaneers had frequently raided most of the coastal settlements, stealing crops, and taking men and women as slaves. Some Mayan slaves were sold in the British colony of Jamaica, and shipped for sale to their colonies of Virginia and the Carolinas.

When the supply of logwood began to diminish, and prices fell in Europe because other dyestuffs became available, the Baymen began to cut tropical cedar and mahogany. They had to go deeper into the forests for this wood, where they began to have hostile encounters with Maya villages. The Baymen reported attacks in 1788 and 1802.

But the main thrust of the Baymen clash with the Maya came in Corozal and Orange Walk districts as part of the Caste War. Belizean Maya challenged lumber encampments established by the Baymen, with limited success. Maya resistance continued until the 1870s, though by the late 19th century, the end of the Caste War brought such conflicts to a close.

=== Conflict with the Garifuna ===
The Garinagu people had an ambivalent relationship with the Baymen. While the Baymen valued the Garinagu's agricultural skills, they wanted them to submit to European control and help capture refugee slaves. The Baymen began a campaign of misinformation, saying the Garinagu had practices of "devil worshipping" and "baby eating." This poisoned relationships between the Creoles and "Kerobs", as they were derogatorily called.
