= Nuala Zahedieh =

British historian

- Born: England
- Occupation: University Professor

Nuala Zahedieh is a British historian and university professor.

== Biography ==
She completed her undergraduate degree, a master's degree, and a PhD in Economic History at the London School of Economics.

== Career ==
She was a professor of Economic and Social History at the University of Edinburgh from 1990 to 2021. She retired from that post in 2021.

She served as Director of the Scottish Centre for Diaspora Studies from 2014 to 2019 and Director of the Edinburgh Centre for Global History from 2019 to 2020. She held a Leverhulme Research Fellowship in 1997-8 and has been a Visiting Fellow at the Massachusetts Historical Society.

== Awards and honours ==
She is a Fellow of the Academy of Social Sciences; Fellow of the Royal Historical Society, and Fellow of Academia Europaea.

Zahedieh is also on the Academic Panel of the Museum of London and is Chair of the Publications Committee of the Economic History Society.

== Publications ==
Her notable books include:

- The Capital and the Colonies: London and the Atlantic Economy 1660–1700
- The British Atlantic Empire and Economic Change 1607–1775 (New Studies in Economic and Social History)
- War, Trade and the State: Anglo-Dutch Conflict, 1652-89
- A Global Trading Network: The Spanish empire in the world economy (1580-1820)

Her book Capital and the Colonies was reviewed positively by Thomas M. Truxes due to the way it handled the historical relationship between London's economy and the Atlantic slave trade.
