= Timeline of piracy in the Bay of Honduras =

Coordinates: 17°N 87°W

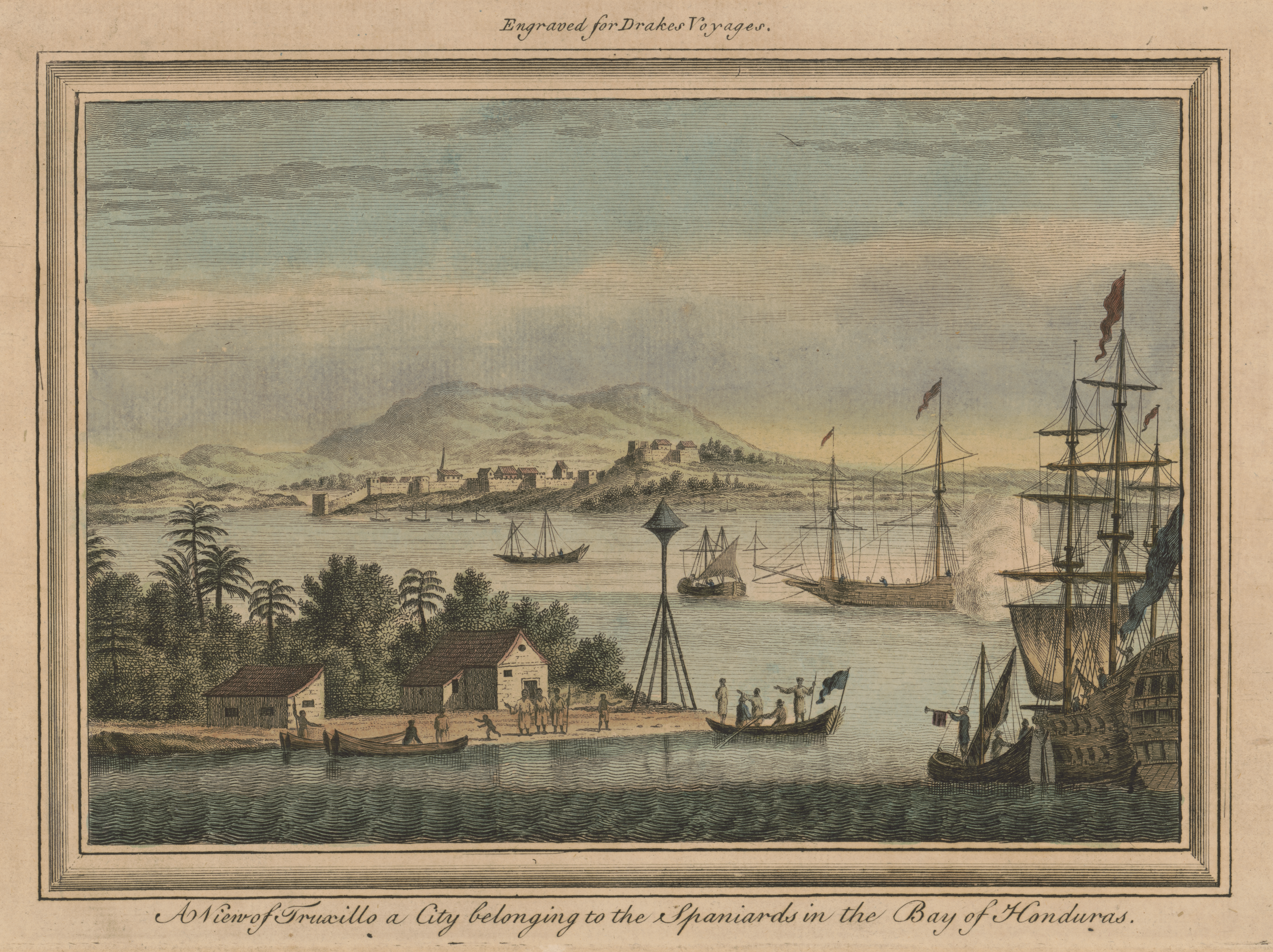
A view of Truxillo Bay and city on the coast of Honduras, 1796 lithograph

A draught of the Bay of Honduras and part of the Musquetto Shore, 1764 map

Pirates, privateers, corsairs, and buccaneers were active in the Bay of Honduras, in the western Caribbean Sea, from the 1540s to the 1860s. Their actions in said bay (the Bay) were part of a broader phenomenon of piracy in the Caribbean, most especially during the Golden Age of Piracy (in the late 17th and early 18th centuries). This is an annotated, chronological list of their deeds, and related events, with a sortable table provided.

== Prelude ==
- 30 July 1502–14 August 1502: Christopher Columbus reconnoitres the southern coast of the Bay during his fourth voyage, this being the first arrival of non-Amerindians to the region.
- July 1508–December 1508: Juan Díaz de Solís and Vicente Yáñez Pinzón, with Pedro de Ledesma, reconnoitre the mouth of the Bay during the Pinzón–Solís voyage.
- 1510s: Cuban slaving expeditions to the Bay Islands.
- 13 November 1518: Diego Velázquez de Cuéllar named adelantado of Yucatán, encompassing the northern half of the Bay.
- January 1524–June 1524: Gil González Dávila founds the first Hispanic settlement in the Bay, Porto Caballos, and further leads a campaign against Manche Chʼol settlements on the Dulce River, bringing the Spanish conquest of Honduras to the Bay.
- 3 May 1524: Cristóbal de Olid founds Triunfo de la Cruz.
- 18 May 1525: Francisco de las Casas relocates Triunfo de la Cruz and christens it Truxillo.
- 8 December 1526: Francisco de Montejo named adelantado of Yucatán.
- July 1528–December 1528: Francisco de Montejo, with Alonso González Dávila, leads a campaign against Chetumal, bringing the Spanish conquest of Yucatán to the Bay, and further (partially) reconnoitres the northern coast of the Bay.
- July 1532–June 1533: Alonso González Dávila (fully) reconnoitres the northern coast of the Bay.
- 8 December 1537: Alonso de Cáceres founds Comayagua.
- 1540s: Marcos de Ayala Trujeque pioneers the Spanish logwood trade, which possibly reaches Bacalar shortly thereafter.
- January 1544–June 1544: Pachecos entrada brings the northern half of the Bay under Spanish rule.
- 1546: Royal Navy established.
- October 1546–June 1547: Pedro de Ávila, under commission by Francisco de Montejo, surveys the Bay.
- 1550: Spanish begin construction of Fort Santa Barbara.

== 16th century ==
- November 1544–December 1544: Twenty-two French corsairs aboard a patax, Pedro Braques captain, cruise the Bay, but are apprehended.
- 1558–1560: French corsairs raid Truxillo thrice, Porto Caballos once, and a nearby settlement called Monguiche once.
- March 1558–June 1558: Two-hundred French corsairs, aboard two ships, raid Porto Caballos.
- 1561: French corsairs raid Porto Caballos and Truxillo.
- January 1571–mid-April 1571: Chuetot, with 50 men aboard a ship from Honfleut, cruises the Bay.
- 13 January 1572: Lutheran pirates or privateers, aboard three ships and a chalupa, raid Porto Caballos.
- 23 February 1573–22 March 1573: Francis Drake, with 17 men aboard the Minion, or John Oxenham aboard the Bear, cruise the Bay (and land at Bonacca) during their Caribbean expedition.
- 2 April 1575–April 1575: Gilbert Horseley, with 32 men on board the John, raids Truxillo and Porto Caballos, and thereafter cruises the Bay.
- 9 May 1575: French corsairs, aboard two zabras, raid Porto Caballos and Truxillo.
- July 1576–December 1576: Andrew Barker, with William Coxe, Philip Roche, and 70 men aboard the Ragged Staffe and Beare, raids Truxillo, but is eventually repulsed.
- October 1577–April 1578: An English pirate or privateer (called Francisco de Acles by the Spanish), with 60 men aboard two ships, cruise the Bay, further sacking Porto Caballos and Bacalar.
- mid-February 1578–mid-March 1578: William Coxe, with 35 men, cruises the Bay.
- May 1580: French corsairs or English pirates or privateers (possibly) cruise the northern half of the Bay (off the Yucatán Peninsula).
- 9 May 1592–June 1592: Christopher Newport, with 200 men aboard the Golden Dragon, Prudence, Margaret, and Virgin, raids Truxillo and Porto Caballos.
- March 1593–December 1593: The Count of Cumberland, with some 125 men aboard the Anthony and the Discovery, attempts to raid Porto Caballos, but is shortly repulsed.
- January 1594–June 1594: Christopher Newport and John Burgh attempt to raid Porto Caballos, but are shortly repulsed, whereupon Newport cruises the Bay with John Middleton.
- 15 May 1594: William Parker and Jérémie Raymond, with four ships, two frigates, and three pinnaces, raid Porto Caballos or Truxillo.
- 1595: English pirates or privateers, in consort with French corsairs, capture Truxillo.
- 1595: An English pirate or privateer, in consort with a French corsair (the former called Rocharte, the latter Jeremías, by the Spanish), attempt to raid Porto Caballos, but upon failing, raid settlements in the Golfo Dulce, and thereafter water in Utila, where they are repulsed.
- May 1595: William Parker, aboard one ship, three consorts, and two pinnaces, (again) raids Porto Caballos, further cruising the Golfo Dulce, and thereafter rendezvousing with Benjamin Wood and Wentworth [captains under Robert Dudley] at Bonacca, whereupon they all raid and occupy Truxillo.
- July 1595: Jérémie Raymond, with three ships, a pinnace, and a galliot, raids and burns Porto Caballos, further cruising the Golfo Dulce, and thereafter retiring to Utila, where the crew are surprised by a Spanish force out of Truxillo.
- 30 March 1597–15 April 1597: Anthony Sherley and William Parker raid Truxillo, Porto Caballos, and riverine settlements on the Dulce River.

== 17th century ==
- 1601: Pirates or privateers aboard four vessels (possibly) cruise the Bay (off the Yucatán Peninsula).
- 1602: Dutch privateer-turned-buccaneer, Bleeveldt or Blauvelt, settles near Bluefields.
- 16 February 1603–7 March 1603: Christopher Newport, with Michael Geare, captures Porto Caballos.
- 7 March 1604–late 1605: Spanish vecinos settle Santo Tomás de Castilla.
- 1606: Six English pirates or privateers, aboard a frigate, raid Porto Caballos, and march towards an inland settlement called Xequexa, were they are apprehended.
- January 1606–June 1606: Dutch privateers harass Spanish galleons at Santo Tomas de Castilla, and further attempt to raid the settlement, but are repulsed.
- 1607: Dutch privateers or pirates raid Santo Tomas de Castilla and Porto Caballos.
- 1610: Dutch privateers or pirates raid Porto Caballos.
- 1613: English, Dutch or French privateers or pirates raid Truxillo.
- 1616: English privateer or buccaneer, Quinn, seeks to plant settlement in Providence Island.
- 1617: English privateers raid Bacalar.
- 3 June 1621: The Dutch West India Company is chartered.
- 1630s: Spanish residents of the Bay begin illicitly trading with Dutch and English ships at port.
- 1630s: English, Dutch, or French buccaneers or pirates begin abducting Amerindian residents of the Bay for sale at non-Spanish slave markets.
- 1630: English, Dutch, or French privateers or pirates raid and burn Truxillo.
- 1630: Anthony Hilton settles Tortuga.
- 4 December 1630: The Providence Island colony is chartered.
- 1631: Providence Island colony's charter is expanded to encompass the Bay.
- 1632: English, Dutch, or French privateers or pirates raid Truxillo.
- 1633: Anthony Hilton and Abraham Chamberlain pioneer the English dye-wood trade in Tortuga.
- 26 April 1633–18 September 1633: Jan Janszoon van Hoorn, under commission from the West India Company, with Diego el Mulatto and Cornelis Jol, raids Truxillo.
- February 1634–late 1635: English or Dutch privateers or buccaneers cruise the Bay.
- 27 December 1635–29 January 1636: Providence Island colony granted letters of reprisal against the Spanish.
- 22 January 1636: Armada de Barlovento established.
- March 1636–May 1636: Providence Island colony commissions privateers William Rous, John Leicester, Cornelius Billinger, Giles Mersh, and William Woodcock, instructing them (among other things) to impress Spanish pilots, including those familiar with the Bay.
- April 1636–mid-May 1636: English or Dutch privateer or buccaneer, Nacre or Neckere, leads 60 English and 100 Miskitu men on an (unsuccessful) march on Truxillo, and thereafter cruises the Bay on a frigate with 25 to 30 men.
- late May 1636: Yucatán forbids the storing of logwood on beaches.
- September 1637: Thomas Newman cruises the Bay aboard a ship and two small craft.
- 1638: Tipu spur widespread revolt against Bacalar, their efforts being possibly aided by piratical raids, and the Peten Itza kingdom.
- 1638: Peter Wallace founds the first English settlement in the Bay, Barcadares.
- 1638: English or Dutch privateers or buccaneers raid Maya settlements on Bennett's Lagoon (near Bacalar).
- mid-March 1638–June 1638: Diego el Mulatto cruises the Bay.
- May 1638: English or Dutch privateers or buccaneers, aboard two ships and five frigates, cruise the Bay.
- 8 June 1638: Proprietors of the Providence Island colony grant William Claiborne letters patent to settle Rattan.
- 10 February 1639: Diego el Mulatto, aboard two ships, raids and scorches an Amerindian settlement on Bonacca.
- May 1639–September 1639: Nathaniel Butler, with William Jackson, 200 English men and an unknown number of Miskitu allies, aboard two ships, under commission of the Providence Island colony, attempts unsuccessful raid of Truxillo.
- early September 1639: English or Dutch privateers or buccaneers, with Alonso Gaitan and Amerindian allies from Bonacca, raid and scorch an Amerindian settlement on Rattan.
- mid-December 1639–3 January 1640: English or Dutch privateers or buccaneers, aboard four ships, cruise the Bay.
- 1640s: English buccaneers or Baymen settle Rattan.
- March 1640: English or Dutch privateers or buccaneers, aboard eight craft, raid and assault Truxillo and a number of Amerindian settlements on Lake Izabal and Utila.
- 1641: Dutch privateers or buccaneers, with Diego Canche, raid Maya settlements near the Belize or Sittee River, and interrupt a Franciscan misión by Bartolomé de Fuensalida.
- 1641: Diego el Mulatto raids and scorches Truxillo, and further ventures inland to abduct women.
- March 1642–April 1642: Diego el Mulatto attempts to raid Amerindian settlements on the Ulua River, but upon failing to do so, raids Porto Caballos.
- 22 November 1642: Diego el Mulatto, with 70 men, raids Bacalar and nearby Maya settlements (north of the Monkey River).
- 20 July 1643–mid-September 1643: William Jackson, with William Rous, Samuel Axe, and a certain Cromwell, with 1,200 recruits from Barbados and St Kitt's, aboard three ships and three pinnaces, raids and holds Truxillo twice, and raids Santo Tomas de Castilla once.
- 1644: English or Dutch pirates raid settlements in the Amatique Bay and the Bay Islands.
- 1644: Spanish begin construction of Castle of San Felipe de Lara.
- 1645: English or Dutch pirates, with 1,600 men aboard sixteen ships, raid Truxillo.
- 1646: English or Dutch pirates raid settlements in Bonacca.
- 1648: English or Dutch pirates raid Truxillo.
- June 1648: English or Dutch privateer or buccaneer, Abraham, raids Bacalar.
- 1650s: English buccaneers-turned-Baymen start logging logwood in the Bay.
- 1650s: Miskitu mercenaries, possibly or likely with Baymen and Shoremen, begin enslaving Amerindian and Hispanic residents of the Bay.
- late July 1650: Spanish oust English buccaneers-turned-settlers from Rattan.
- 29 May 1652: English or Dutch privateer or buccaneer, Abraham, (again) raids Bacalar.
- November 1652: English or Dutch privateers or buccaneers raid Maya settlements on the New River.
- 23 October 1654: English or Dutch privateers or buccaneers interrupt a Bacalar entrada by Francisco Pérez near the Belize River.
- 1659: English or Dutch privateers or buccaneers impress or enslave a number of residents of Maya settlements near Bacalar.
- 1660s: English buccaneers or Baymen raid Bacalar-in-Pacha.
- 1660: François l'Olonnais raids Truxillo.
- 11 December 1662: The Council of Jamaica resolve to carry on trade with Spaniards in the Bay (among others), by force of arms if necessary.
- 1665: The Armada de Barlovento is reformed.
- 19 March 1665–29 June 1665: John Morris, David Martien, Henry Morgan, Jacob Fackman, and a certain Freeman cruise the Bay, and further raid Truxillo and a number of Spanish or Amerindian coastal settlements in the Bay.
- June 1667–June 1668: François l'Olonnais, with Mozes van Klijn, harasses Spanish shipping in the Bay, sacks Porto Caballos, and further attempts raids of nearby Spanish settlements.
- 1672: English, French, or Dutch pirates, privateers or buccaneers raid Truxillo and nearby Esparza.
- 22 June 1672: English logging in Spanish dominions (including the Bay) is deemed piracy by real cédula.
- 1676: French pirates, privateers or buccaneers raid Truxillo.
- August 1677: Bartholomew Sharpe interrupts a Franciscan misión by Joseph Delgado, and further possibly raids a number of Maya settlements near the Belize River.
- 1678: English, French, or Dutch pirates, privateers or buccaneers raid Truxillo and nearby Verapaz.
- 26 September 1679: John Coxon captures a Spanish merchant vessel laden with indigo, possibly in the Bay.
- mid-July 1680–August 1680: Pedro de Castro, with Juan Corso and Giorgio Nicolo, surprises English shipping in the Bay.
- January 1682–May 1682: Jean Hamlin surprises English shipping in the Bay.
- 17 May 1683–16 June 1683: Laurens de Graaf, Michiel Andrieszoon, Nicholas van Hoorn, Michel de Grammont, Jacob Hall, and Jean Toccard cruise the Bay.
- December 1683: Dutch pirates or privateers raid Spanish settlements on Lake Izabal.
- 27 April 1684–5 May 1684: Dutch pirates or privateers raid Spanish settlements on Lake Izabal.
- January 1685–September 1685: Laurens de Graaf and Michel de Grammont, with Jan Willems, Michiel Andrieszoon, George Bannister, and Pierre Bot, cruise the Bay.
- 1686: English, Dutch, or French pirates, privateers or buccaneers raid or attack Spanish settlements on Lake Izabal.
- March 1686: Laurens de Graaf raids Spanish or Maya settlements in the Bay of Ascension, after which they cruise the Bay.
- 1687: English, Dutch, or French pirates, privateers or buccaneers raid or attack Bodegas del Golfo, Olancho, and Santo Tomas de Castilla.
- February 1688: Jan Willems and Jacob Evertson surprise Spanish shipping in the Bay.
- 1690: English, Dutch, or French pirates raid Spanish or Amerindian settlements in the Bay of Amatique.
- 16 November 1694–February 1695: Spanish privateers surprise English shipping near the Belize River.

== 18th century ==
- November 1705: Archibaldo Magdonel de Narión and Francisco Joseph Jiménez, with 30 men aboard two goletas, cruise the Chetumal Bay.
- January 1707–September 1707: English buccaneers-turned-Baymen raid or attack Tipu.
- February 1718–mid-March 1718: Blackbeard, with about 180 English and 70 Afro-Caribbean men, aboard the Queen Ann's Revenge and two Spanish prizes, waters at Coxen Hole, and surprises merchant captain William Wade aboard the William and Mary.
- 1 April 1718–9 April 1718: Blackbeard, with Stede Bonnet, Lieutenant Richards, and Israel Hands, aboard the Queen Ann's Revenge and the sloop Revenge, surprises merchant captains David Harriot, Wyar, and James, aboard a ship and five sloops, near the Turneffe Atoll.
- 16 December 1718–23 December 1718: Charles Vane, with Robert Deal, surprises English shipping in the Bay.
- January 1721–mid-April 1721: Vernon of Jamaica, captain of a merchant ship, arrests Charles Vane, possibly within the Bay.
- 10 January 1722–February 1722: George Lowther, with John Walkers and 80 to 90 men, aboard a ship and a sloop, surprises English shipping near the Belize River.
- August 1722: Thomas Anstis, with John Fenn aboard the Morning Star, surprises merchant captain Dursey near the Belize River.
- August 1722–mid-February 1723: Esteban de la Barca, with 50 men aboard two periaguas, surprises an English merchant frigate near the Belize River.
- March 1723: Fifty to sixty Spanish privateers, aboard one vessel, surprise English shipping near the Belize River, but are afterwards massacred by Edward Low and George Lowther, with Nicholas Lewis and about 50 men.
- March 1724: Francis Spriggs, with about 40 men aboard the Bachelor's Delight, surprises merchant captains Samuel Pick Jr. (of Rhode Island), Dixxe Gross, William Wood, Thomas Morris, Simon Fulmore, James Nelley, and Hackins (of London) near Bonacca.
- May 1724: Spanish privateers surprise English shipping in the Bay.
- September 1724: Francis Spriggs and Richard Shipton, with 85 men, surprise English shipping in the Bay, but are shortly repulsed by HMS Diamond (James Windham captain).
- 23 December 1724: Francis Spriggs and Richard Shipton, with Nicholas Simmons, Jonathan Barlow, 10 English and three or four Afro-Caribbean men, aboard one periagua, surprise merchant captains Glen, Matthew Perry, and Ebenezer Kent in the Bay.
- February 1725: Francis Spriggs surprises English shipping in the Bay.
- 25 March 1725–5 April 1725: Juan Antonio Díaz de la Rabia, with 90 men aboard a frigate, cruises near the Belize River, but is seized by HMS Diamond (Timothy Bridge lieutenant).
- January 1727: Baymen, with about 100 Miskitu allies aboard several small craft, raid Chunhuhub, Tela, and Tihosuco in the Bay of Ascension.
- March 1727–June 1727: Spanish re-settle Bacalar as a military post.
- 25 May 1727: Spanish privateers aboard two periaguas surprise merchant captain Rickets in the Bay.
- November 1728: Spanish privateers surprise English shipping in the Bay.
- 1729: Spanish begin construction of Fort San Felipe at Bacalar.
- 1729: English, French, or Dutch privateers or pirates raid Porto Caballos.
- February 1729: Spanish privateers surprise English shipping in the Bay.
- February 1730: Spanish privateers surprise English shipping near the Belize River, but are repulsed by merchant captain Burrows and Baymen.
- January 1731: Eighty Spanish privateers, aboard a guardacostas, surprise merchant captain John Young (of New York) in the Bay.
- 24 March 1731: Pedro Polis, with 60 men aboard a guardacostas, surprises the John and Jane (Ed. Burt captain, about 30 men and some women on board) near the Turneffe Atoll, but is eventually repulsed.
- 28 June 1731: Twenty-five Spanish privateers, aboard a sloop, surprise merchant captain Roger Groves (of New York), with 30 to 40 men, in the Bay.
- August 1731: Spanish privateers, aboard a periagua, surprise English shipping in the Bay.
- January 1732–February 1732: Seventy Spanish privateers, aboard a brigantine, surprise merchant captain Farrington (of Boston) in the Bay.
- May 1732: Spanish privateers surprise a merchant captain Wickham in the Bay.
- August 1732: Spanish privateers surprise a merchant captain Knox in the Bay.
- December 1732–January 1733: Spanish privateers, with 330 to 340 men aboard a galley and two sloops, surprise merchant captains Hindman, Bradin, and Dutch in the Bay.
- 10 March 1733: Spanish privateers surprise English shipping in the Bay.
- December 1733–January 1734: Spanish privateers surprise merchant captain Underwood (of Boston) in the Bay.
- September 1734: Spanish privateers surprise merchant captain William Downs in the Bay.
- 28 September 1734–11 October 1734: Spanish privateers, with 120 men aboard two sloops and five periaguas, surprise merchant captains Ephraim Higgins, Richard Dursey (of Rhode Island), and Edmonds (of Boston) in the Bay, but are shortly repulsed.
- November 1734: Spanish privateers surprise a Dutch merchant fly boat in the Bay.
- October 1735: Spanish privateers, aboard two periaguas, surprise merchant captains Bond (of Boston), Smith (of Jamaica), Wickham (of Rhode Island), Pitman (of Rhode Island), and Cranston (of Rhode Island) in the Bay.
- March 1736: Spanish privateers, del Petro Polla and Philip Ackling, engage merchant captains Woodberry, Willis (of Jamaica), and John Davis in the Bay.
- 1 July 1736–22 November 1736: Spanish privateers surprise English shipping in the Bay.
- 19 January 1737: Spanish privateers surprise English shipping near the Belize River.
- 26 April 1737: Spanish privateers, with 500 to 600 men aboard a man of war, a galley, and five periaguas, surprise merchant captains Ralph Harle, John Ray, Blackadore, Hall, and Bennet near the Belize River.
- mid-August 1737–September 1737: Spanish privateers surprise merchant captains John Thomas Woner, Maxey Drowse, and John Busley in the Bay.
- 18 January 1738: Thirty Spanish privateers, aboard two or three periaguas, surprise merchant captain Ames Wadland near the Turneffe Atoll.
- April 1738: Spanish privateers, aboard three large periaguas, surprise a merchant sloop in the Bay.
- July 1738: Spanish privateers surprise merchant captain Edward Buckley in the Bay, but are shortly repulsed.
- 12 August 1738: Eighteen Spanish privateers, aboard a sloop, surprise merchant captain Stephen Bastwick in the Bay, but are shortly repulsed.
- 15 January 1739: Spanish privateers aboard a sloop surprise merchant captains Mark Anderson, John Guyn, and Zacariah Williams in the Bay.
- 1 February 1739–2 March 1739: Spanish privateers surprise merchant captain Gwynn (of Boston) in the Bay.
- March 1739: Spanish privateers surprise merchant captains Collis (of Rhode Island), Joseph Williams, Wiliam Barbour, Cobb, and Burges near Turneffe, but are shortly repulsed.
- April 1739: Spanish privateers aboard a sloop surprise merchant captain Mark Anderson in the Bay.
- May 1739: Spanish privateers, aboard two men of war and a half-galley, surprise English shipping in the Bay.
- September 1739: Spanish privateers surprise merchant captain White in the Bay.
- October 1739: Twenty Spanish privateers, aboard two periaguas surprise merchant captains Pustle and Gowan in the Bay.
- October 1739–February 1740: Holiday, with 75 men aboard a sloop, under commission from Jamaica, cruises against Spanish privateers in the Bay.
- January 1740–mid-April 1740: A Jamaican privateer, with merchant captains Wilson and Gowan, seizes a Spanish privateer in the Bay.
- April 1740: Spanish privateers surprise merchant captain Sears in the Bay.
- April 1740: Spanish privateers, aboard two craft, surprise the John and Jane in the Bay, but are eventually repulsed by merchant captains Vincent (of Boston), Thatcher, and a number of Baymen aboard a small sloop.
- June 1740–August 1740: Spanish privateers surprise merchant captains Dunham, Montgomery, and Flowers in the Bay.
- February 1741: Spanish privateers, with 110 men aboard two periaguas, surprise merchant captain Burchell in the Bay.
- April 1741–May 1741: Spanish privateers aboard two periaguas surprise merchant captains Bursley, Bunker, Johnston, Davis, Taylor, and Card in the Bay.
- June 1741: Spanish privateers surprise merchant captain John Wise in the Bay.
- December 1741–April 1742: Spanish privateers surprise merchant captains Snow, Smith, Mason, and Humphreys in the Bay.
- 1 January 1742–2 July 1742: Ball of Boston surprises a Spanish privateer cruising in the Bay.
- July 1742–August 1742: Spanish privateers surprise merchant captains Charles Davidson and Coffin in the Bay.
- March 1744: Spanish privateers, aboard one vessel, surprise merchant captains Fiske, Bell, and Richardson in the Bay.
- January 1746: Spanish privateers surprise English shipping near the Turneffe Atoll.
- February 1746–March 1746: Spanish privateers, aboard a periagua, surprise merchant captain Small in the Bay.
- May 1747–June 1747: Spanish privateers, aboard two craft, surprise English shipping off the Belize River.
- December 1747–February 1748: Spanish privateers, aboard two craft, surprise a merchant schooner in the Bay.
- January 1748: Felipe López de la Flor, under commission from Yucatán, raids and scorches Barcadares and the Baymen's logging camps on the Belize River.
- July 1748: Felipe López de la Flor (again) raids and scorches the Baymen's settlement and camps on the Belize River, but is eventually repulsed.
- August 1748–September 1748: Spanish privateers surprise English shipping in the Bay.
- 1 January 1750–3 August 1750: Spanish privateers surprise English shipping in the Bay.
- 6 May 1750: Spanish privateers, with 123 men aboard a galley, surprise merchant captains Vervel, Hysham, Kattur, and Brigs on the New River, but are shortly repulsed.
- 17 September 1750: Spanish privateers, aboard two half-galleys, surprise merchant captains Lilly and Riven in the Bay, but are shortly repulsed.
- 1751: Spanish settle Omoa as a military post, and (eventually) begin construction of Fortaleza de San Fernando.
- 25 December 1751–27 December 1751: Spanish privateers, aboard two galleys and a brig, surprise English shipping near the Belize River and Water Caye, but are shortly repulsed by merchant captains Henry Stevenson, Troup, and others.
- 13 February 1752: Spanish privateers surprise merchant captain Newgar on the Belize River.
- June 1752: Spanish privateers surprise merchant captains Devereux, Maudsley, Couzens, Mosely, and Rand in the Bay, but are eventually repulsed by William Pitt, Mosely, McNamara, 50 Baymen, and 70 Shoremen.
- August 1752: Spanish privateers, aboard several craft or periaguas, surprise merchant captains James Man and John Lance in the Chetumal Bay.
- 2 August 1752–28 September 1752: Spanish privateers, aboard six periaguas and a flat (later joined by captain Palmo with 76 men aboard a dorey and two periaguas), surprise merchant captains Crowel (of New York) and Hall (of Connecticut), who are later joined by captains Arnold and Hill, near Water Caye.
- October 1752: Spanish privateers, aboard a guardacostas, surprise English shipping in the Bay, but are shortly repulsed.
- December 1752: Spanish privateers, aboard two brigs, surprise English shipping in the Bay.
- December 1752 – February 1753: Spanish privateers surprise merchant captains Philip Hotton of Connecticut and James Ward of Pennsylvania in the Bay.
- 4 December 1752: Spanish privateers surprise English shipping in the Bay, but are shortly repulsed.
- January 1753: Spanish privateers surprise merchant captains Telamon Phoenix, Conaway, and Spurrier in the Bay.
- January 1753: Antonio Alexis, aboard a brig, surprises merchant captains Coverly, Conolly, Green, Lord, and Menzie in the Bay.
- 24 February 1753: Spanish privateers surprise English shipping in the Bay, but are shortly repulsed.
- 28 February 1753: Spanish privateers, aboard a guardacostas, surprise merchant captain Clark in the Bay, but are shortly repulsed.
- May 1753: Spanish privateers, aboard a brig, surprise merchant captain Ed. Menzies near Caye Bokell, but are shortly repulsed.
- 24 May 1753: Sergeant of Rhode Island, with merchant captains Lawrence, Brown, Dickson, and a number of Baymen, capture and burn a Spanish privateer.
- July 1753: Spanish privateers surprise merchant captain Dunscomb near Turneffe.
- 12 September 1753: Spanish privateers, with 170 men aboard a galley, surprise merchant captains Burger, French, and Menzie near Turneffe.
- April 1754: Spanish privateers surprise merchant captain Man near Glover's Reef.
- 23 May 1754: Spanish privateers surprise merchant captains Lawrence, Brown, and Dickson near Water Caye.
- 14 May 1755: Baymen request and are granted a detachment of twenty British Army soldiers for their defence.
- May 1756: Spanish privateers, aboard a guardacostas, surprise merchant captain Ebbets in the Bay.
- July 1770: Spanish privateers surprise English shipping in the Bay.
- June 1771 – July 1771: Certain pirates are apprehended by the Baymen.
- March 1772: Spanish privateers surprise two merchant vessels in the Bay.
- 6 March 1772: Spanish privateers, aboard two guardacostas, surprise merchant captain Thermin near Glover's Reef.
- March 1773 – July 1773: Spanish privateers surprise English shipping in the Bay.
- January 1775 – February 1775: Spanish privateers, aboard a guardacostas, surprise merchant captains Ward of South Carolina and Stamer near Glover's Reef.
- 12 September 1777: Hezekiah Anthony captures the settlement on St George's Caye, which is shortly ransomed by the Baymen, whereafter Anthony seizes English shipping in the Sibun River.
- November 1796 – December 1796: Spanish privateers surprise English shipping in the Bay.
- June 1797: English frigate, possibly of or with Baymen, raids Truxillo.

== 19th century ==
- January 1804: French privateers, aboard one vessel, surprise merchant captains Hurry and Hills near Turneffe.
- 1 July 1804 – 10 July 1804: Spanish privateers surprise merchant captain Jonathan Card near Utila.
- 1 August 1805 – 18 September 1805: The Mary Anne, tender of HMS Swift (Smith lieutenant), captures a Spanish privateer or guardacostas.
- January 1806 – August 1807: Felucca, a Spanish privateer, cruises off the Mullins River, but is eventually chased off by HMS Wolf (William Burn captain), HMS Gaelon, HMS Aurora, and a number of Baymen aboard a gunboat.
- December 1818 – October 1819: Pirate Mitchell cruises near the Belize River.
- 10 May 1819: Louis-Michel Aury, with Gordon, raids or attacks Spanish settlements on Lake Izabal.
- 2 November 1822 – 22 November 1822: Francis Valpy, with 20 men aboard a schooner, raids a Baymen's settlement on Calabash Caye, and seizes a merchant brig near Glover's Reef.
- February 1823: Jean Lafitte surprises English shipping in the Bay, but is eventually chased off by USS Revenge.
- 31 March 1824: Pirates surprise a merchant schooner (Jeykill owner) in the Bay, and further massacre the crew.
- 26 December 1858: American freebooters aboard the Susan are wrecked off Glover's Reef, whereupon the Superintendent of colonial Belize (forcibly) removes them to Mobile, Alabama, aboard HMS Basilisk.
- 1 June 1859 – 17 June 1859: Spanish privateers surprise merchant captain Gunn near Rattan.
- 7 September 1860 – 17 September 1860: HMS Icarus captures William Walker and a number of American freebooters, whereupon the Superintendent of colonial Belize turns them over to the (Hispanic) Honduran authorities at Truxillo.

== Table ==
The following table lists 16th to 18th century events from above. (Note: Citations, provided in relevant sections above, are here omitted for brevity. Failed piratical activities included. Start and End columns provide chronological lower and upper bounds. Party columns list named event participants. "–" means missing, unknown, or unavailable.)

Timeline of 16th to 18th century piracy in the Bay of Honduras.
Start	End	Place	Event	Party	Party	Notes
Nov 1544	Dec 1544	Bay	Cruise	Braques	—N/a	With 22 French corsairs in a patax
1558	1560	Caballos; Monguiche; Truxillo	Raid	—N/a	—N/a	Various French corsairs
Mar 1558	Jun 1558	Caballos	Raid	—N/a	—N/a	200 French corsairs in two ships
1561	1561	Caballos; Truxillo	Raid	—N/a	—N/a	Various French corsairs
Jan 1571	Apr 1571	Bay	Cruise	Chuetot	—N/a	With 50 men in ship from Honfleut
13 Jan 1572	13 Jan 1572	Caballos	Raid	—N/a	—N/a	Various Lutherans in three ships and a chalupa
23 Feb 1573	22 Mar 1573	Bonacca	Cruise	Drake or Oxenham	López Vaez	In Minion or Bear
2 Apr 1575	Apr 1575	Caballos; Truxillo	Cruise; raid	Horseley	—N/a	—N/a
9 May 1575	9 May 1575	Caballos; Truxillo	Raid	—N/a	—N/a	Various French corsairs in two zabras
Jul 1576	Dec 1576	Truxillo	Raid	Barker	—N/a	With Coxe, Roche, and 70 men in Ragged Staffe and Beare
Oct 1577	Apr 1578	Bacalar; Caballos	Cruise; raid	Acles	—N/a	With 60 men in two ships
Feb 1578	Mar 1578	Bay	Cruise	Coxe	—N/a	With 35 men
May 1580	May 1580	Bay	Cruise	—N/a	—N/a	Various English or French men
9 May 1592	Jun 1592	Caballos; Truxillo	Raid	Newport	—N/a	With 200 men in the Golden Dragon, Prudence, Margaret, and Virgin
Mar 1593	Dec 1593	Caballos	Raid	Cumberland	—N/a	With some 125 men in the Anthony and Discovery
Jan 1594	Jun 1594	Caballos	Cruise; raid	Newport; Burgh; Middleton	—N/a	—N/a
15 May 1594	15 May 1594	Caballos or Truxillo	Raid	Parker; Raymond	—N/a	In nine vessels
1595	1595	Truxillo	Raid	—N/a	—N/a	Various English and French men
1595	1595	Caballos; Golfo Dulce; Utila	Cruise; raid	Rocharte; Jeremías	—N/a	Various English and French men
May 1595	May 1595	Caballos; Golfo Dulce; Bonacca; Truxillo	Cruise; raid	Parker; Wood; Wentworth	—N/a	In six or seven vessels
Jul 1595	Jul 1595	Caballos; Golfo Dulce; Utila	Cruise; raid	Raymond	—N/a	In five vessels
30 Mar 1597	15 Apr 1597	Caballos; Golfo Dulce; Truxillo	Raid	Sherley; Parker	—N/a	—N/a
1601	1601	Bay	Cruise	—N/a	—N/a	Various men in four vessels
1602	1602	Bluefields	Cruise	Blauvelt	—N/a	—N/a
16 Feb 1603	7 Mar 1603	Caballos	Raid	Newport; Geare	—N/a	—N/a
7 Mar 1604	Dec 1605	Sto Tomas	Charter	Governor	—N/a	Various Spanish vecinos settle port
1606	1606	Caballos; Xequexa	Raid	—N/a	—N/a	Six English men in a frigate
Jan 1606	Jun 1606	Sto Tomas	Raid	—N/a	—N/a	Various Dutch men
1607	1607	Caballos; Sto Tomas	Raid	—N/a	—N/a	Various Dutch men
1610	1610	Caballos	Raid	—N/a	—N/a	Various Dutch men
1613	1613	Truxillo	Raid	—N/a	—N/a	Various English, Dutch, or French men
1616	1616	Providence	Camp	Quinn	—N/a	—N/a
1617	1617	Bacalar	Raid	—N/a	—N/a	Various English men
3 Jun 1621	3 Jun 1621	Hague	Charter	Dutch WIC	—N/a	Various Dutch men
1630	1639	Bay	Smuggling	—N/a	—N/a	By Spanish vecinos with Dutch and English ships
1630	1639	Bay	Slaving	—N/a	—N/a	Of Amerindians by various English, Dutch, or French men
1630	1630	Truxillo	Raid	—N/a	—N/a	Various English, Dutch, or French men
1630	1630	Tortuga	Camp	Hilton	—N/a	—N/a
4 Dec 1630	4 Dec 1630	London	Charter	Providence Isl Co	—N/a	Various English men
1631	1631	London	Charter	Providence Isl Co	—N/a	Charter territory expanded to the Bay
1632	1632	Truxillo	Raid	—N/a	—N/a	Various English, Dutch, or French men
1633	1633	Tortuga	Logging	Hilton; Chamberlain	—N/a	Of dye-woods
26 Apr 1633	18 Sep 1633	Truxillo	Raid	Hoorn	—N/a	With Mulatto and Jol, for the Dutch WIC
Feb 1634	Dec 1635	Bay	Cruise	—N/a	—N/a	Various English or Dutch men
27 Dec 1635	29 Jan 1636	London	Charter	Providence Isl Co	—N/a	Granted letters of reprisal against Spanish
22 Jan 1636	22 Jan 1636	Madrid	Charter	Armada de Barlovento	—N/a	Various Spanish men
Mar 1636	May 1636	Providence	Charter	Providence Isl Co	—N/a	Various men commissioned as privateers
Apr 1636	May 1636	Truxillo	Cruise; raid	Nacre or Nackere	—N/a	With (initially) 60 English and 100 Miskitu men, and (later) 25 to 30 men in a frigate
May 1636	May 1636	Mérida	Logging	Governor	—N/a	Forbids laying logwood in open beaches
Sep 1637	Sep 1637	Bay	Cruise	Newman	—N/a	In three vessels
1638	1638	Tipu	Revolt	—N/a	—N/a	Including possible piratical aid
1638	1638	Barcadares	Camp	Wallace	—N/a	—N/a
1638	1638	Bennett's Lagn	Raid	—N/a	—N/a	Of Maya hamlets by various English or Dutch men
Mar 1638	Jun 1638	Bay	Cruise	Mulatto	—N/a	—N/a
May 1638	May 1638	Bay	Cruise	—N/a	—N/a	Various English or Dutch men in seven vessels
8 Jun 1638	8 Jun 1638	Providence	Charter	Providence Isl Co	—N/a	Grant settlement charter for Rattan to Claiborne
10 Feb 1639	10 Feb 1639	Bonacca	Raid	Mulatto	—N/a	In two ships
May 1639	Sep 1639	Truxillo	Raid	Butler; Jackson	—N/a	With 200 English and various Miskitu men, for Providence Isl Co
Sep 1639	Sep 1639	Rattan	Raid	—N/a	—N/a	Various English or Dutch men, with Gaitan and various Amerindian residents of Bonacca
Dec 1639	3 Jan 1640	Bay	Cruise	—N/a	—N/a	Various English or Dutch men in four ships
1640	1649	Rattan	Camp	—N/a	—N/a	Various English men or Baymen
Mar 1640	Mar 1640	Lake Izabal; Truxillo; Utila	Raid	—N/a	—N/a	Various English or Dutch men in eight vessels
1641	1641	Belize or Sittee Riv	Raid	—N/a	Fuensalida	Various Dutch men with Canche
1641	1641	Truxillo	Raid	Mulatto	—N/a	—N/a
Mar 1642	Apr 1642	Caballos; Ulua Riv	Raid	Mulatto	—N/a	—N/a
22 Nov 1642	22 Nov 1642	Bacalar; Monkey Riv	Raid	Mulatto	—N/a	With 70 men
20 Jul 1643	Sep 1643	Truxillo; Sto Tomas	Raid	Jackson	—N/a	With Rous, Axe, Cromwell, and 1,200 men in six vessels
1644	1644	Amatique Bay; Bay Islands	Raid	—N/a	—N/a	Various English or Dutch men
1644	1644	Lake Izabal	Charter	Governor	—N/a	Spanish fort built
1645	1645	Truxillo	Raid	—N/a	—N/a	1,600 English or Dutch men in sixteen ships
1646	1646	Bonacca	Raid	—N/a	—N/a	Various English or Dutch men
1648	1648	Truxillo	Raid	—N/a	—N/a	Various English or Dutch men
Jun 1648	Jun 1648	Bacalar	Raid	Abraham	—N/a	—N/a
1650	1659	Barcadares	Logging	—N/a	—N/a	Of logwood by various Baymen
1650	1659	Bay	Slaving	—N/a	—N/a	Of Amerindians and Spaniards by Miskitu men with Baymen and Shoremen
Jul 1650	Jul 1650	Rattan	Raid	—N/a	—N/a	Various Spanish men against English men, Baymen, or Shoremen
29 May 1652	29 May 1652	Bacalar	Raid	Abraham	—N/a	—N/a
Nov 1652	Nov 1652	New Riv	Raid	—N/a	—N/a	Of Maya hamlets by English or Dutch men
23 Oct 1654	23 Oct 1654	Belize Riv	Cruise	—N/a	Pérez	Various English or Dutch men
1659	1659	Hondo Riv	Raid	—N/a	—N/a	Of Maya hamlets by English or Dutch men
1660	1669	Pacha	Raid	—N/a	—N/a	Various Englishmen or Baymen
1660	1660	Truxillo	Raid	Olonnais	—N/a	—N/a
11 Dec 1662	11 Dec 1662	Spanish Town	Smuggling	Council of Jamaica	—N/a	Resolve to force trade with Spaniards
1665	1665	Madrid	Charter	Armada de Barlovento	—N/a	Reformed
19 Mar 1665	29 Jun 1665	Truxillo; other	Cruise; raid	Morris; Martien; Morgan; Fackman; Freeman	—N/a	Where other means various Spanish or Amerindian coastal settlements in the Bay of Honduras
Jun 1667	Jun 1668	Caballos; Golfo Dulce	Cruise; raid	Olonnais	—N/a	With Klijn
1672	1672	Esparza; Truxillo	Raid	—N/a	—N/a	Various English, French, or Dutch men
22 Jun 1672	22 Jun 1672	Madrid	Charter	Crown	—N/a	real cédula deems logging by non-Spaniards piracy
1676	1676	Truxillo	Raid	—N/a	—N/a	Various French men
Aug 1677	Aug 1677	Belize Riv	Cruise; raid	Sharpe	Delgado	—N/a
1678	1678	Truxillo; Verapaz	Raid	—N/a	—N/a	Various English, French, or Dutch men
26 Sep 1679	26 Sep 1679	Bay	Cruise	Coxon	—N/a	Captures indigo-laden Spanish merchant vessel
Jul 1680	Aug 1680	Bay	Cruise	Castro	—N/a	With Corso and Nicolo, against English shipping
Jan 1682	May 1682	Bay	Cruise	Hamlin	—N/a	Against English shipping
17 May 1683	16 Jun 1683	Bay	Cruise	Graaf; Andrieszoon; Hoorn; Grammont; Hall; Toccard	—N/a	—N/a
Dec 1683	Dec 1683	Lake Izabal	Raid	—N/a	—N/a	Various Dutch men
27 Apr 1684	5 May 1684	Lake Izabal	Raid	—N/a	—N/a	Various Dutch men
Jan 1685	Sep 1685	Bay	Cruise	Graaf; Grammont	—N/a	With Willems, Andrieszoon, Bannister, and Bot
1686	1686	Lake Izabal	Raid	—N/a	—N/a	Various English, Dutch, or French men
Mar 1686	Mar 1686	Ascension Bay	Cruise; raid	Graaf	—N/a	Of Maya hamlets
1687	1687	Bodegas; Olancho; Sto Tomas	Raid	—N/a	—N/a	Various English, Dutch, or French men
Feb 1688	Feb 1688	Bay	Cruise	Willems; Evertson	—N/a	Against Spanish shipping
1690	1690	Amatique Bay	Raid	—N/a	—N/a	Various English, Dutch, or French men
16 Nov 1694	Feb 1695	Belize Riv	Raid	—N/a	—N/a	Various Spanish men against English shipping
Nov 1705	Nov 1705	Chetumal Bay	Cruise	Magdonel de Narión; Jiménez	—N/a	With 30 men in two goletas
Jan 1707	Sep 1707	Tipu	Raid	—N/a	—N/a	Various Baymen
Feb 1718	Mar 1718	Rattan	Cruise	Blackbeard	Wade	With some 180 English and 70 Afro-Caribbean men in three vessels
1 Apr 1718	9 Apr 1718	Turneffe Atoll	Cruise	Blackbeard	Harriot; Wyar; James	With Bonnet, Richards, and Hands in two vessels
16 Dec 1718	23 Dec 1718	Bay	Cruise	Vane	—N/a	With Deal, against English shipping
Jan 1721	Apr 1721	Bay	Cruise	Vernon	Vane	Including arrest of Vane for piracy
10 Jan 1722	Feb 1722	Belize Riv	Cruise	Lowther	—N/a	With Walkers and 80 to 90 men in two vessels, against English shipping
Aug 1722	Aug 1722	Belize Riv	Cruise	Anstis	Dursey	With Fenn in the Morning Star
Aug 1722	Feb 1723	Belize Riv	Cruise	Barca	—N/a	With 50 men in two periaguas
Mar 1723	Mar 1723	Belize Riv	Raid; massacre	Low; Lowther	—N/a	With Lewis and some 50 men, against 50 to 60 Spanish privateers in one vessel
Mar 1724	Mar 1724	Bonacca	Cruise	Spriggs	Pick Jr; Gross; Wood; Morris; Fulmore; Nelley; Hackins	With some 40 men in the Bachelor's Delight
May 1724	May 1724	Bay	Cruise	—N/a	—N/a	Various Spanish privateers
Sep 1724	Sep 1724	Bay	Cruise	Spriggs; Shipton	Windham	With 85 men, against HMS Diamond
23 Dec 1724	23 Dec 1724	Bay	Cruise	Spriggs; Shipton	Glen; Perry; Kent	With Simmons, Barlow, 10 English and three or four Afro-Caribbean men in a periagua
Feb 1725	Feb 1725	Bay	Cruise	Spriggs	—N/a	Against English shipping
25 Mar 1725	5 Apr 1725	Belize Riv	Cruise	Díaz de la Rabia	Bridge	With 90 Spanish privateers in a frigate, against HMS Diamond
Jan 1727	Jan 1727	Ascension Bay	Raid	—N/a	—N/a	Various Baymen with some 100 Miskitu men in several small craft
Mar 1727	Jun 1727	Bacalar	Charter	Governor	—N/a	Various Spanish vecinos re-settle as military post
25 May 1727	25 May 1727	Bay	Cruise	—N/a	Rickets	Various Spanish privateers in two periaguas
Nov 1728	Nov 1728	Bay	Cruise	—N/a	—N/a	Various Spanish privateers
1729	1729	Bacalar	Charter	Governor	—N/a	Spanish fort built
1729	1729	Caballos	Raid	—N/a	—N/a	Various English, French, or Dutch men
Feb 1729	Feb 1729	Bay	Cruise	—N/a	—N/a	Various Spanish privateers

== See also ==
- Timeline of piracy

== Notes and references ==
=== References ===
==== News ====
1. anon. (29 July 1718). "London, July 29". St. James's Evening Post. No. 496. London: Printed for T. Warner, at the Black-Boy in Pater-Noster-Row. p. 2.
2. anon. (24 May 1722a). "London". Compleat Set of St. James's Journals. No. 4. London: Printed for S. Popping, at the Black-Raven, in Pater-noster-Row. p. 5.
3. anon. (3 July 1722b). "London, July 3". Evening Post. No. 2017. London: Printed by E. Berington in Silver-street Bloomsbury, and Sold by E. Murphey near Stationers-Hall. pp. 1–2.
4. anon. (7 July 1722c). "The following Account is taken from the Bozton Gazettee of May 7, viz. ...". Weekly Journal or British Gazetteer. London: Printed and Sold by J. Read, in White-Fryers near Fleet-Street. p. 4.
5. anon. (16 May 1723a). "Rhode Island, May 9th". Boston News-Letter. No. 1007. Boston, MA: Printed and Sold by B. Green, at his Printing-House in Newbury-Street. p. 4.
6. anon. (27 June 1723b). "Boston, May 6". Daily Post. No. 1169. London: Printed by H. Meere in the Old Baily near Ludgate. p. 1.
7. anon. (27 July 1723c). "There is Advice from Rhode Island, dated May the 9th, that Captain Edward Lloyd ...". Weekly Journal or Saturday's Post. No. 248. London: Printed by N. Mist, in Great-Carter-Lane. p. 9.
8. anon. (31 August 1723d). "New York, June 10". British Journal. No. 50. London: Printed for T. Warner, at the Black Boy in Pater-Noster-Row. p. 3.
9. anon. (9 November 1723e). "London, November 9". Weekly Journal or Saturday's Post. No. 263. London: Printed by N. Mist, in Great-Carter-Lane. p. 2.
10. anon. (9 November 1723f). "London, November 9". Weekly Journal or Saturday's Post. No. 263. London: Printed by N. Mist, in Great-Carter-Lane. p. 14.
11. anon. (12 June 1724a). "St. Christopher's, March 24". Daily Courant. No. 7065. London. p. 1.
12. anon. (13 July 1724b). "London, July 13". Daily Post. No. 1496. London: Printed by H. Meere in the Old Baily near Ludgate. p. 1.
13. anon. (23 July 1724c). "New Port, July 17th". Boston News-Letter. No. 1069. Boston, MA: Printed and Sold by B. Green, at his Printing-House in Newbury-Street. p. 2.
14. anon. (10 August 1724d). "New-York, June 10". Daily Post. No. 1520. London: Printed by H. Meere in the Old Baily near Ludgate. p. 1.
15. anon. (1 October 1724e). "London, June 13". Boston News-Letter. No. 1079. Boston, MA: Printed and Sold by B. Green, at his Printing-House in Newbury-Street. p. 1.
16. anon. (10 December 1724f). "Rhode-Island, Decemb. 4". Boston News-Letter. No. 1089. Boston, MA: Printed and Sold by B. Green, at his Printing-House in Newbury-Street. p. 2.
17. anon. (12 January 1725a). "Philadelphia, January 12". American Weekly Mercury. No. 265. Philadelphia: Printed and Sold by Andrew Bradford, at the Bible in the Second Street; and also by William Bradford in New-York. p. 3.
18. anon. (11 February 1725b). "New-Port, Feb. 5". Boston News-Letter. No. 1098. Boston, MA: Printed and Sold by B. Green, at his Printing-House in Newbury-Street. p. 2.
19. anon. (29 April 1725c). "New-Port, April 22". Boston News-Letter. No. 1109. Boston, MA: Printed and Sold by B. Green, at his Printing-House in Newbury-Street. p. 2.
20. anon. (8 May 1725d). "London, May 8". Mist's Weekly Journal. No. 2. London: Printed by N. Mist, in Great-Carter-Lane. p. 2.
21. anon. (13 May 1725e). "Paris, Sept. 30". Boston News-Letter. No. 1111. Boston, MA: Printed and Sold by B. Green, at his Printing-House in Newbury-Street. pp. 1–2.
22. anon. (21 October 1725f). "Extract of a Letter from Jamaica, to a Merchant in London, dated May 21st. 1725". American Weekly Mercury. No. 305. Philadelphia: Printed and Sold by Andrew Bradford, at the Bible in the Second Street; and also by William Bradford in New-York. p. 3.
23. anon. (27 November 1727). "London, October 18. 1727". Boston Gazette. No. 418. Boston, MA: Printed by B. Green, jun. for Henry Marshall Post-Master, and Sold at the Post Office, in Cornhill. p. 4.
24. anon. (16 January 1729a). "London, January 16". Daily Journal. No. 2504. London: Printed by J. Purser in Salisbury-Court, Fleetstreet. p. 1.
25. anon. (8 May 1729b). "Boston in New England, March 20". Daily Journal. No. 2600. London: Printed by J. Purser in Salisbury-Court, Fleetstreet. p. 1.
26. anon. (13 August 1730). "Philadelphia in Pensilvania, June 18". Daily Journal. No. 2996. London: Printed by J. Purser in Salisbury-Court, Fleetstreet. p. 2.
27. anon. (3 May 1731a). "London". Daily Journal. No. 3221. London: Printed by J. Purser in Salisbury-Court, Fleetstreet. p. 1.
28. anon. (12 May 1731b). "London". Daily Journal. No. 3229. London: Printed by J. Purser in Salisbury-Court, Fleetstreet. p. 1.
29. anon. (26 July 1731c). "New-York, July 22". New-England Weekly Journal. No. 227. Boston, MA: Printed by S. Kneeland & T. Green, at the Printing-House in Queen Street. p. 2.
30. anon. (29 July 1731d). "New York, July 12". Boston News-Letter. No. 1435. Boston, MA: Printed and Sold by B. Green, at his Printing-House in Newbury-Street. p. 2.
31. anon. (24 September 1731e). "London". Daily Journal. No. 3345. London: Printed by J. Purser in Salisbury-Court, Fleetstreet. p. 3.
32. anon. (23 October 1731f). "London, October 23". Country Journal or the Craftsman. No. 277. London: By Caleb D'Anvers, of Gray's-Inn. p. 2.
33. anon. (6 November 1731g). "London". London Evening Post. No. 614. London: Printed by S. Nevill, in the Old-Baily near Ludgate. p. 1.
34. anon. (24 February 1732a). "Boston, Feb. 24". Boston News-Letter. No. 1465. Boston, MA: Printed and Sold by B. Green, at his Printing-House in Newbury-Street. p. 2.
35. anon. (22 July 1732b). "London". Universal Spectator and Weekly Journal. No. 198. London: Printed by S. Nevill, in the Old Baily near Ludgate; and Sold by J. Roberts in Warwick-Lane. pp. 2–3.
36. anon. (3 October 1732c). "London". Daily Journal. No. 3666. London: Printed by J. Purser in Salisbury-Court, Fleetstreet. p. 2.
37. anon. (27 May 1732d). "Extract of a Letter from Campeche in the Province of Yucatan, dated Nov. 24". Read's Weekly Journal or British Gazetteer. No. 375. London: Printed for E. Nunneley, at the Printing Office the Corner House in White Friars, Fleet-Street. p. 3.
38. anon. (1733a). "Boston in New-England, April 16". Bee or Universal Weekly Pamphlet. Vol. 2, no. 21. London: Printed for M. Harris, at the Sign of the Bee-Hive, in High-Holborn. p. 902.
39. anon. (16 April 1733b). "Boston, April 16". Weekly Rehearsal. No. 81. Boston, MA: Printed by T. Fleet, at the Heart & Crown in Cornhill. pp. 1–2.
40. anon. (23 May 1733c). "London, May 23". Parker's Penny Post. No. 1262. London: Printed by George Parker, at the Star in Salisbury-Court Fleet. pp. 2–3.
41. anon. (6 August 1733d). "London, August the 6th". Parker's Penny Post. No. 1294. London: Printed by George Parker, at the Star in Salisbury-Court Fleet. pp. 2–3.
42. anon. (8 August 1733e). "London, August the 8th". Parker's Penny Post. No. 1295. London: Printed by George Parker, at the Star in Salisbury-Court Fleet. pp. 2–3.
43. anon. (24 February 1734a). "Newport, Jan. 1734-5". New-York Weekly Journal. No. 68. New York: Printed and Sold by John Peter Zenger. p. 4.
44. anon. (11 November 1734b). "Boston, October 14". New-York Weekly Journal. No. 54. New York: Printed and Sold by John Peter Zenger. p. 3.
45. anon. (18 January 1735a). "London, January 18". General Evening Post. No. 203. London: Printed for and Sold by J. Roberts in Warwick-Lane. pp. 1–2.
46. anon. (30 January 1735b). "Boston, Jan. 30". Boston News-Letter. No. 1615. Boston, MA: Printed and Sold by B. Green, at his Printing-House in Newbury-Street. p. 2.
47. anon. (28 February 1735c). "London, February 17, 19, and 21". Dublin Evening Post. Vol. 4, no. 67. Dublin: Printed by and for Theophilus Jones in Clarendon-street, opposite to Copinger's-lane. p. 50.
48. anon. (22 December 1735d). "Boston, December 15". New-York Weekly Journal. No. 111. New York: Printed and Sold by John Peter Zenger. p. 3.
49. anon. (15 June 1736). "London". London Evening Post. No. 1338. London: Printed by S. Nevill, in the Old-Baily near Ludgate. p. 2.
50. anon. (28 February 1737a). "Newport, Rhode-Island, Feb. 21". Boston Evening-Post. No. 81. Boston, MA: Printed by T. Fleet, at the Heart and Crown in Cornhill. p. 2.
51. anon. (10 March 1737b). "London, November 22". Virginia Gazette. No. 84. Williamsburg, VA: Printed by W. Parks. pp. 3–4.
52. anon. (10 March 1737c). "Williamsburg, March 10". Virginia Gazette. No. 84. Williamsburg, VA: Printed by W. Parks. p. 4.
53. anon. (26 September 1737d). "Boston, September 12". New-York Weekly Journal. No. 203. New York: Printed and Sold by John Peter Zenger. p. 3.
54. anon. (10 October 1737e). "Boston, August 29". New-York Weekly Journal. No. 205. New York: Printed and Sold by John Peter Zenger. p. 2.
55. anon. (16 February 1738a). "Charlstown, South-Carolina, Nov. 17". Boston News-Letter. No. 1769. Boston, MA: Printed and Sold by B. Green, at his Printing-House in Newbury-Street. p. 2.
56. anon. (23 March 1738b). "Newport, Rhode-Island, March 17". Boston News-Letter. No. 1774. Boston, MA: Printed and Sold by B. Green, at his Printing-House in Newbury-Street. p. 2.
57. anon. (17 June 1738c). "New England. Boston, May 8". Daily Gazetteer. No. 922. London: Printed for T. Cooper, at the Globe in Pater-noster-Row. p. 1.
58. anon. (21 October 1738d). "From the New England Weekly Journal, dated Aug. 29. New York, Aug. 21". Daily Gazetteer. No. 1030. London: Printed for T. Cooper, at the Globe in Pater-noster-Row. p. 1.
59. anon. (16 April 1739a). "Boston. March 12". New-York Weekly Journal. No. 279. New York: Printed and Sold by John Peter Zenger. p. 3.
60. anon. (17 May 1739b). "Newport, Rhode-Island, May 11". Boston News-Letter. No. 1834. Boston, MA: Printed and Sold by B. Green, at his Printing-House in Newbury-Street. p. 2.
61. anon. (24 May 1739c). "Charles-Town South-Carolina, March 6". American Weekly Mercury. No. 1012. Philadelphia, PA: Printed and Sold by Andrew Bradford, at the Sign of the Bible in Front-street. p. 2.
62. anon. (23 June 1739d). "London". Universal Spectator and Weekly Journal. No. 559. London: Printed by S. Nevill, in the Old Baily near Ludgate; and Sold by J. Roberts in Warwick-Lane. p. 3.
63. anon. (17 July 1739e). "London, July 17". General Evening Post. No. 906. London: Printed for and Sold by J. Roberts in Warwick-Lane. p. 2.
64. anon. (22 September 1739f). "Newport, Rhode-Island, May 11". Virginia Gazette. No. 151. Williamsburg, VA: Printed by W. Parks. p. 2.
65. anon. (22 November 1739g). "London, November 22". General Evening Post. No. 961. London: Printed for and Sold by J. Roberts in Warwick-Lane. p. 2.
66. anon. (24 November 1739h). "London, November 24, 1739". Old Common Sense or the Englishman's Journal. No. 147. Printed by J. Purser in White-Fryars, near Fleet-Street. p. 287.
67. anon. (8 December 1739i). "London, December 8". General Evening Post. No. 968. London: Printed for and Sold by J. Roberts in Warwick-Lane. p. 2.
68. anon. (14 April 1740a). "Extract of a Letter from a Gentleman of Distinction in Antigua, to His Friend in Boston, Dated March 8th, 1739,40". Boston Evening-Post. No. 245. Boston, MA: Printed by T. Fleet, at the Heart and Crown in Cornhill. p. 2.
69. anon. (29 May 1740b). "London, May 29". General Evening Post. No. 1042. London: Printed for and Sold by J. Roberts in Warwick-Lane. p. 2.
70. anon. (10 June 1740c). "London". London and Country Journal. No. 76 (Tuesday ed.). London: Printed by R. Walker in Fleet Lane. pp. 2–3.
71. anon. (14 August 1740d). "Boston". Boston News-Letter. No. 1899. Boston, MA: Printed and Sold by B. Green, at his Printing-House in Newbury-Street. p. 2.
72. anon. (29 September 1740e). "New-York". New-York Weekly Journal. No. 356. New York: Printed and Sold by John Peter Zenger. p. 3.
73. anon. (2 October 1740f). "Rhode-Island, Sept. 26". Boston News-Letter. No. 1906. Boston, MA: Printed and Sold by B. Green, at his Printing-House in Newbury-Street. p. 2.
74. anon. (7 October 1740g). "New-York, September 29". New-England Weekly Journal. No. 703. Boston, MA: Printed by S. Kneeland & T. Green, at the Printing-House in Queen Street. pp. 1–2.
75. anon. (19 March 1741a). "New-York, February 23d". Boston News-Letter. No. 1930. Boston, MA: Printed and Sold by B. Green, at his Printing-House in Newbury-Street. p. 1.
76. anon. (15 June 1741b). "Boston". Boston Evening-Post. No. 306. Boston, MA: Printed by T. Fleet, at the Heart and Crown in Cornhill. p. 1.
77. anon. (16 October 1741c). "America. Boston, July 20". Daily Gazetteer. No. 1975. London: Printed for T. Cooper, at the Globe in Pater-noster-Row. p. 3.
78. anon. (12 April 1742a). "Boston". Boston Evening-Post. No. 349. Boston, MA: Printed by T. Fleet, at the Heart and Crown in Cornhill. pp. 1–2.
79. anon. (29 April 1742b). "Charles-Town, South-Carolina, March 27". American Weekly Mercury. No. 1165. Philadelphia: Printed and Sold by Andrew Bradford, at the Bible in the Second Street; and also by William Bradford in New-York. p. 3.
80. anon. (2 July 1742c). "Ships taken by the Britons". Scots Magazine. Vol. 4. Edinburgh: Printed by Sands, Brymer, Murray and Cochran. p. 338. hdl:2027/hvd.32044092547249.
81. anon. (4 October 1742d). "Newport, October 1". Boston Post-Boy. No. 407. Boston, MA: Printed for E. Huske, Post-Master. p. 2.
82. anon. (26 April 1744a). "Boston". Boston News-Letter. No. 2091. Boston, MA: Printed and Sold by B. Green, at his Printing-House in Newbury-Street. p. 2.
83. anon. (3 July 1744b). "Plantation news. Boston, April 30". London Evening Post. No. 2598. London: Printed by S. Nevill, in the Old-Baily near Ludgate. p. 7.
84. anon. (13 March 1746a). "London". St. James's Evening Post. No. 5639. London: Printed for T. Warner, at the Black-Boy in Pater-Noster-Row. p. 3.
85. anon. (29 May 1746b). "London". General London Evening Mercury. No. 482. London: Printed for A. McCulloh, at the Lamb and Bible, near Devreux-Court, without Temple-Bar. p. 3.
86. anon. (31 May 1746c). "We have Advice that Capt. Small, of New England, from Honduras, ...". National Journal or Country Gazette. No. 31. London: Printed for J. Purser in Red-Lyon Court, Fleetstreet. p. 61.
87. anon. (13 August 1747). "London, August 13". General Evening Post. No. 2159. London: Printed for and Sold by J. Roberts in Warwick-Lane. p. 2.
88. anon. (10 March 1748a). "Last Tuesday Night arrived here a small Scooner from the Bay ...". Boston News-Letter. No. 2395. Boston, MA: Printed and Sold by B. Green, at his Printing-House in Newbury-Street. p. 4.
89. anon. (5 November 1748b). "A Brigantine from Boston, Dupree Master, is taken ...". General Advertiser. No. 4378. London: Printed by W. Egelsham, at Mr. Woodfall's, the Corner of Ivy-Lane, Pater-noster-Row. p. 1.
90. anon. (16 July 1750a). "New-York". New-York Evening Post. No. 269. New York: Printed by Henry De Foreest, in Wall-Street. p. 3.
91. anon. (23 July 1750b). "New-York, July 16". Boston Evening-Post. No. 780. Boston, MA: Printed by T. Fleet, at the Heart and Crown in Cornhill. p. 1.
92. anon. (3 August 1750c). "According to advices from Madrid, one of the motives ...". Scots Magazine. Vol. 12. Edinburgh: Printed by Sands, Brymer, Murray and Cochran. p. 391. hdl:2027/hvd.32044092547116.
93. anon. (22 September 1750d). "Plantation news. New York, July 16". Whitehall Evening Post or London Intelligencer. No. 720. London: Sold by C. Corbett, opposite St. Dunstan's Church in Fleet-Street. p. 1.
94. anon. (22 October 1750e). "New-York, October 15". Boston Evening-Post. No. 793. Boston, MA: Printed by T. Fleet, at the Heart and Crown in Cornhill. p. 4.
95. anon. (2 March 1752a). "Boston". Boston Evening-Post. No. 863. Boston, MA: Printed by T. Fleet, at the Heart and Crown in Cornhill. p. 1.
96. anon. (9 March 1752b). "Charles-Town, in South-Carolina, February 22". New-York Gazette or Weekly Post-Boy. No. 477. New York: Printed by James Parker, at the New Printing Office in Beaver-Street. p. 2.
97. anon. (10 August 1752c). "New York, Aug. 3". Boston Evening-Post. No. 886. Boston, MA: Printed by T. Fleet, at the Heart and Crown in Cornhill. p. 1.
98. anon. (18 August 1752d). "London, August 20". Harrop's Manchester Mercury. No. 25. Manchester: Printed by Joseph Harrop, at the Sign of the Printing Press, opposite the Exchange. p. 99.
99. anon. (27 August 1752e). "CANTERBURY PACES". London Evening Post. No. 3878. London: Printed by S. Nevill, in the Old-Baily near Ludgate. p. 1.
100. anon. (1 September 1752f). "London, August 27". Harrop's Manchester Mercury. No. 27. Manchester: Printed by Joseph Harrop, at the Sign of the Printing Press, opposite the Exchange. p. 103.
101. anon. (25 September 1752g). "New-York September 18". Boston Post-Boy. No. 925. Boston, MA: Printed for E. Huske, Post-Master. p. 1.
102. anon. (27 September 1752h). "London". London Daily Advertiser. No. 483. London: Printed for J. Dixwell, at J. Moore's, in Bartholomew-Lane; and sold at the Dunciad in St. Paul's Church yard. p. 2.
103. anon. (2 October 1752i). "Newport, Rhode-Island, Sept. 28". Boston Post-Boy. No. 926. Boston, MA: Printed for E. Huske, Post-Master. p. 2.
104. anon. (10 October 1752j). "Plantation news. Rhode-Island, July 24". Harrop's Manchester Mercury. No. 31. Manchester: Printed by Joseph Harrop, at the Sign of the Printing Press, opposite the Exchange. p. 119.
105. anon. (27 November 1752k). "Copy of a Letter from Capt. M'Namara, of the Friendship, Arrived at Falmouth, from the Bay of Honduras, Dated Sept. 22". New-York Mercury. No. 16. New York: Printed by Hugh Gaine, at the Printing-Office on Hunter's-Key, next Door to Mr. Walton's Storehouse. p. 2.
106. anon. (27 November 1752l). "New-York, November 20". Boston Post-Boy. No. 934. Boston, MA: Printed for E. Huske, Post-Master. p. 2.
107. anon. (10 August 1752m). "New York, Aug. 3". Boston Evening-Post. No. 886. Boston, MA: Printed by T. Fleet, at the Heart and Crown in Cornhill. p. 1.
108. anon. (2 October 1752n). "Newport, Rhode-Island, Sept. 28". Boston Post-Boy. No. 926. Boston, MA: Printed for E. Huske, Post-Master. p. 2.
109. anon. (6 January 1753a). "Plantation news. ... Boston, Nov. 6". Read's Weekly Journal or British Gazetteer. No. 1478. London: Printed for E. Nunneley, at the Printing Office the Corner House in White Friars, Fleet-Street. p. 1.
110. anon. (20 January 1753b). "London". Read's Weekly Journal or British Gazetteer. No. 1480. London: Printed for E. Nunneley, at the Printing Office the Corner House in White Friars, Fleet-Street. pp. 3–4.
111. anon. (30 January 1753c). "London, January 27". Harrop's Manchester Mercury. No. 47. Manchester: Printed by Joseph Harrop, at the Sign of the Printing Press, opposite the Exchange. p. 182.
112. anon. (13 February 1753d). "New-York, February 5". Pennsylvania Gazette. No. 1260. Philadelphia: Printed by B. Franklin, Post-Master, and D. Hall, at the New-Printing-Office, near the Market. p. 2.
113. anon. (24 February 1753e). "London". Read's Weekly Journal or British Gazetteer. No. 1485. London: Printed for E. Nunneley, at the Printing Office the Corner House in White Friars, Fleet-Street. pp. 2–3.
114. anon. (6 March 1753f). "New-York, February 19". Boston Gazette. No. 10. Boston, MA: Printed by B. Green, jun. for Henry Marshall Post-Master, and Sold at the Post Office, in Cornhill. p. 2.
115. anon. (13 March 1753g). "London, March 6". Harrop's Manchester Mercury. No. 53. Manchester: Printed by Joseph Harrop, at the Sign of the Printing Press, opposite the Exchange. p. 202.
116. anon. (20 March 1753h). "New-York, March 12". Pennsylvania Gazette. No. 1265. Philadelphia: Printed by B. Franklin, Post-Master, and D. Hall, at the New-Printing-Office, near the Market. p. 2.
117. anon. (12 April 1753i). "New-York, April 9". Pennsylvania Journal or Weekly Advertiser. No. 540. Philadelphia: Printed and Sold by William Bradford, at the Sign of the Bible the Corner of Black Horse Alley, in Second-Street. p. 3.
118. anon. (26 April 1753j). "London". London Evening Post. No. 3978. London: Printed by S. Nevill, in the Old-Baily near Ludgate. p. 4.
119. anon. (11 June 1753k). "Captain Ramsey in 32 Days from the Bay of Honduras, informs us, ...". New-York Mercury. No. 44. New York: Printed by Hugh Gaine, at the Printing-Office on Hunter's-Key, next Door to Mr. Walton's Storehouse. p. 3.
120. anon. (6 August 1753l). "New-York, July 30". Boston Post-Boy. No. 970. Boston, MA: Printed for E. Huske, Post-Master. p. 1.
121. anon. (20 August 1753m). "London". Public Advertiser. No. 5869. London: Printed and Sold by W. Egelsham the Corner of Ivy-Lane, Pater-noster-Row. p. 1.
122. anon. (11 September 1753n). "Advices from New-York of the 30th of July say, ...". London Evening Post. No. 4030. London: Printed by S. Nevill, in the Old-Baily near Ludgate. p. 5.
123. anon. (20 September 1753o). "New-York, September 17". Pennsylvania Gazette. No. 1291. Philadelphia: Printed by B. Franklin, Post-Master, and D. Hall, at the New-Printing-Office, near the Market. p. 3.
124. anon. (8 November 1753p). "New-York, November 5". Pennsylvania Gazette. No. 1298. Philadelphia: Printed by B. Franklin, Post-Master, and D. Hall, at the New-Printing-Office, near the Market. p. 2.
125. anon. (4 March 1754a). "Last Week Captain Edward Morris arrived here from Rhode-Island, ...". New-York Mercury. No. 82. New York: Printed by Hugh Gaine, at the Printing-Office on Hunter's-Key, next Door to Mr. Walton's Storehouse. p. 3.
126. anon. (11 June 1754b). "New-York, June 3". Boston Gazette. No. 76. Boston, MA: Printed by B. Green, jun. for Henry Marshall Post-Master, and Sold at the Post Office, in Cornhill. p. 2.
127. anon. (18 July 1754c). "New-York, July 2". Pennsylvania Gazette. No. 1334. Philadelphia: Printed by B. Franklin, Post-Master, and D. Hall, at the New-Printing-Office, near the Market. p. 7.
128. anon. (27 May 1756). "New-York, May 17". Boston News-Letter. No. 2812. Boston, MA: Printed and Sold by B. Green, at his Printing-House in Newbury-Street. p. 2.
129. anon. (26 September 1770a). "London". Gazetteer and New Daily Advertiser. No. 12971. London: Printed for Charles Say, in Newgate-street. p. 2.
130. anon. (8 November 1770b). "London". Middlesex Journal. No. 250. London: Printed for J. Wheble, at No. 20, in Pater-noster Row. p. 2.
131. anon. (29 November 1770c). "Abstract of a Letter from Jamaica". New-York Journal. No. 1456. New York: Printed and published by John Holt, near the Exchange. p. 208.
132. anon. (22 August 1771). "St. John's, in Antigua, July 27". New-York Journal. No. 1494. New York: Printed and published by John Holt, near the Exchange. p. 414.
133. anon. (2 May 1772a). "Postscript. ... London". London Evening Post. No. 6915. London: Printed by S. Nevill, in the Old-Baily near Ludgate. p. 4.
134. anon. (28 September 1772b). "A vessel from New Providence brings advice, ...". Pennsylvania Packet. No. 49. Philadelphia: Printed by John Dunlap, at the Newest Printing-Office, in Market-Street. p. 4.
135. anon. (14 September 1773). "Postscript. ... London". Middlesex Journal. No. 696. London: Printed for J. Wheble, at No. 20, in Pater-noster Row. p. 4.
136. anon. (20 April 1775). "London". London Evening Post. No. 8279. London: Printed by S. Nevill, in the Old-Baily near Ludgate. p. 5.
137. anon. (22 November 1777a). "Extract of a Letter from Honduras, Dated Oct. 6". Rivington's New-York Loyal Gazette. No. 144. New York: J. Rivington. p. 3. LCCN sn83030844. OCLC 2267230.
138. anon. (25 December 1777b). "London". Daily Advertiser. No. 14672. London: Printed for J. Fenour, at No. 33, opposite St. Dunstan's Church, in Fleet-Street. p. 8.
139. anon. (7 October 1797). "Arrived, ship Elizabeth, Capt. Edes, from the bay ...". Spectator. Vol. 1, no. 2. New York: Published (Wednesdays and Saturdays) by George F. Hopkins, Printer of the Laws of the United States for the District of New-York. p. 3.
140. anon. (20 March 1804). "Extract of a Letter from Honduras-Received at Jamaica". Philadelphia Evening Post. Vol. 1, no. 26. Philadelphia: By William McCorkle, No. 21, Walnut-Street. p. 3.
141. anon. (2 April 1819). "A letter from the Bay of Honduras, ...". Columbian. Vol. 10, no. 2770. New York: By A. Spooner, No. 69 Pine-street. p. 2.
142. anon. (3 July 1819a). "From Honduras". Newport Mercury. Vol. 58, no. 2986. Newport, RI: Printed and published by Wm. & J. H. Barber, Opposite the Brick-Market. p. 3.
143. anon. (28 July 1819b). "Yesterday arrived at this post the U.S. brig Enterprize, ...". Columbian. Vol. 10, no. 2866. New York: By A. Spooner, No. 69 Pine-street. p. 2.
144. anon. (15 May 1824). "Extract of a letter dated Belize, Honduras, 7th April, 1824". Jamaica Journal. Vol. 2, no. 5. Kingston, Jam. p. 55.
145. anon. (4 July 1859). "Our Honduras Correspondence". New York Herald. Vol. 24, no. 184 (Morning ed.). New York. p. 5.
146. anon. (1860a). "Occasional Papers of the Nautical Club.--No. XII". Nautical Magazine and Naval Chronicler. Vol. 29. London: Simpkin, Marshall & Co. pp. 597–609. hdl:2027/nyp.33433066364856.
147. anon. (18 August 1860b). "INTERESTING FROM CENTRAL AMERICA". New York Herald. No. 8745 (Morning ed.). New York. p. 1.

==== Journals ====
1. Aliphat Fernández, Mario M.; Caso Barrera, Laura (2013). "La construcción histórica de las Tierras Bajas Mayas del Sur por medio de mapas esquemáticos". Historia Mexicana. 63 (2): 839–875.
2. Baudot, Georges (1986). "Dissidences indiennes et complicités flibustières dans le Yucatán du XVII e siècle". Cahiers du monde hispanique et luso-brésilien. 46 (sn): 21–33. doi:10.3406/carav.1986.2260. JSTOR 40852876.
3. Bialuschewski, Arne (2017). "Slaves of the Buccaneers: Mayas in Captivity in the Second Half of the Seventeenth Century". Ethnohistory. 64 (1): 41–63. doi:10.1215/00141801-3688359.
4. Bialuschewski, Arne (2020). "Juan Gallardo: A Native American Buccaneer". Hispanic American Historical Review. 100 (2): 233–256. doi:10.1215/00182168-8178200. S2CID 218799883.
5. Botella-Ordinas, E. (2010). "DEBATING EMPIRES, INVENTING EMPIRES: British Territorial Claims Against the Spaniards in America, 1670—1714". Journal for Early Modern Cultural Studies. 10 (1): 142–168. JSTOR 23267356.
6. Carillo y Ancona, Crescencio (9 November 1878). "El orígen de Belice". Boletín de la Sociedad de Geografía y Estadística de la República Mexicana. 3. 4 (sn): 254–264. hdl:2027/mdp.39015008360342.
7. De la O Torres, Rodrigo Alejandro (January–June 2016). "La presencia de corsarios franceses en el Golfo-Caribe entre 1536-1566 : una propuesta de análisis espacial". Historia 2.0: Conocimiento Histórico en Clave Digital. 6 (11): 36–56. ISSN 2027-9035.
8. De la O Torres, Rodrigo Alejandro (July–December 2019). "Miedos y fenómeno de la piratería en el Golfo-Caribe durante el siglo XVI. Un ensayo de aproximación". Historelo revista de historia regional y local. 11 (2): 267–300. doi:10.15446/historelo.v11n22.73263. ISSN 2145-132X. S2CID 198778698.
9. Harlow, Vincent T. (1924). "The voyages of Captain William Jackson, 1642-5". Camden. Third Series. 34 (sn): 1–39. doi:10.1017/S2042171000006920.
10. Hussey, Roland D. (1929). "Spanish Reaction to Foreign Aggression in the Caribbean to about 1680". Hispanic American Historical Review. 9 (3): 286–302. doi:10.2307/2506623. JSTOR 2506623.
11. Joseph, Gilbert M. (1980). "John Coxxx and the Role of Buccaneering in the Settlement of the Yucatan Colonial Frontier". Terrae Incognitae. 12 (1): 65–84. doi:10.1179/tin.1980.12.1.65. OCLC 5525852552.
12. Lang, M. F. (1994). "The Armada de Barlovento, fleet despatch and transport of Mercury to Mexico, 1637-1738". Revista de Indias. 54 (202): 575–591. doi:10.3989/revindias.1994.i202.1120. OCLC 773517874. ProQuest 1300744584.
13. Meléndez Chaverri, Carlos (1977). "Ciudades fundadas en la América Central en el siglo XVI (sinópsis alfabética)". Anuario de Estudios Centroamericanos. 3 (1): 57–80.
14. Obando Andrade, Rafael (2016). "Zambos y negros de La Taguzgalpa: actores claves en el contrabando centroamericano. 1642-1715". Revista cuadernos del Caribe. 13 (21): 7–20.
15. Offen, Karl H. (April 2011). "Puritan Bioprospecting in Central America and the West Indies". Itinerario. 35 (1): 15–47. doi:10.1017/S0165115311000040. OCLC 776016944. S2CID 164165627.
16. Offen, Karl H. (2015). "Mapping Amerindian Captivity in Colonial Mosquitia". Journal of Latin American Geography. 14 (3): 35–65. doi:10.1353/lag.2015.0042. OCLC 7979658371. S2CID 146266532.
17. Reichert, Rafal (2016). "El Caribe centroamericano en la estrategia defensivomilitar de la Casa de los Austrias, siglos XVI y XVII". Caribbean Studies. 44 (1): 111–140. doi:10.1353/crb.2016.0004. S2CID 201774040.
18. Reichert, Rafal (January–June 2017). "El golfo de Honduras: estrategias geopolíticas y militares de una frontera imperial, siglos XVI-XVIII". Tzintzun. 65 (sn): 9–40.
19. Reichert, Rafal (March–June 2018). "Corsarios españoles en el Golfo de Honduras, 1713-1763". Estudios de Cultura Maya. 51 (sn): 151–174. doi:10.19130/iifl.ecm.2018.51.884.
20. Stemp, W. James; Awe, Jaime J.; Helmke, Christophe G. B. (7 April 2016). "A Possible Paleoindian/Early Archaic Point from Ladyville, Belize, Central America" (PDF). PaleoAmerica. 2 (1): 70–73. doi:10.1179/2055557115Y.0000000009. S2CID 130966757.
21. Zahedieh, Nuala (1986). "Trade, Plunder, and Economic Development in Early English Jamaica, 1655-89". Economic History Review. 39 (2): 205–222. doi:10.2307/2596150. JSTOR 2596150.
22. Zahedieh, Nuala (1990). "A Frugal, Prudential and Hopeful Trade'. Privateering in Jamaica, 1655–89". Journal of Imperial and Commonwealth History. 18 (2): 145–168. doi:10.1080/03086539008582813. OCLC 5652203548.
23. Zamora Castellanos, P. (1941). "Monografías departamentales : Izabal: Extracto de un estudio, por el socio, General e Ingeniero Pedro Zamora Castellanos". Anales de la Sociedad de Geografía e Historia. 17 (3): 168–187.

==== Theses ====
1. Anderson, Jennifer L. (2007). Nature's Currency: The Atlantic Mahogany Trade, 1720–1830 (PhD). New York: New York University. ProQuest 304841794.
2. Breuer, Kimberley Henke (1993). Colonies of happenstance: The english settlements in central america, 1525-1787 (MA). Arlington, TX: University of Texas. OCLC 35313362. ProQuest 230667983.
3. De la O Torres, Rodrigo Alejandro (November 2014). De corsarios, mares y costas: El corso en la construcción del espacio Golfo-Caribe. 1527-1620 (PhD). Mérida, Yuc.: Centro de Investigaciones y Estudios Superiores en Antropología Social.
4. Finamore, Daniel (1994). Sailors and slaves on the wood-cutting frontier: archaeology of the British Bay settlement, Belize (PhD). Boston, MA: University of Boston. OCLC 33382653. ProQuest 304114781.
5. Genkins, Daniel (10 August 2018). Entangled Empires: Anglo-Spanish Competition in the Seventeenth-Century Caribbean (PhD). Nashville, TN: Vanderbilt University. OCLC 1103506045.
6. McJunkin, David Morgan (1991). Logwood: An inquiry into the historical biogeography of Haematoxylum campechianum L. and related dyewoods of the neotropics (PhD). Los Angeles: University of California. OCLC 24057056. ProQuest 303932948.
7. Mihok, Lorena Diane (2013). Unearthing Augusta: Landscapes of Royalization on Roatan Island, Honduras (PhD). Tampa, Fl.: University of South Florida.
8. Vazquez Barke, Gabriela (August 2012). Bacalar en el siglo XVII: colonización y resistencia (MA). Merida, Yuc.: Centro de Investigaciones y Estudios Superiores en Antropología Social.
9. Vazquez Barke, Gabriela (2016). Los poderes y los hombres (PhD). Merida, Yuc.: Centro de Investigaciones y Estudios Superiores en Antropología Social.
10. Zackrison, James L. (1985). The Castillo de San Fernando de Omoa: The History of a Fiasco (MA). Loma Linda, CA: Loma Linda University.

==== Print ====
1. anon. (1829). The Honduras almanack, for the year of our Lord 1829 ...: Calculated to the meridian of Belize (1st ed.). Belize: Published by Authority of the Legislative Assembly. hdl:2027/nnc1.cu56617763. OCLC 682190774.
2. Adams, Richard E. W.; Macleod, Murdo J., eds. (1998). Mesoamerica. The Cambridge history of the native peoples of the Americas. Vol. 2 (1st ed.). Cambridge: Cambridge University Press. ISBN 0521652057.
3. Ancona, Eligio (1878). Historia de Yucatan, desde la època más remota hasta nuestros dias. Vol. 2 (1st ed.). Merida, Yuc.: Impr. de M. Heredia Argüelles.
4. Andrews, Kenneth R., ed. (1959). English privateering voyages to the West Indies, 1588-1595: documents relating to English voyages to the West Indies from the defeat of the armada to the last voyage of Sir Francis Drake. Works issued by the Hakluyt Society. Ser. 2. No. 111 (1st ed.). Cambridge: Published for the Hakluyt Society at the University Press. hdl:2027/mdp.39015026881832. OCLC 504851.
5. Arranz Márquez, Luis (2018). "Pedro de Ledesma". Diccionario Biográfico electrónico. Real Academia de la Historia.
6. Asturias, Francisco (1925). Belice (1st ed.). Guatemala: Sociedad de Geografía é Historia de Guatemala. hdl:2027/txu.059173022907279.
7. Bancroft, Hubert Howe (1883). The Works of Hubert Howe Bancroft. Vol. 7 (1st ed.). San Francisco: A. L. Bancroft & Co.
8. Bancroft, Hubert Howe (1886). The Works of Hubert Howe Bancroft. Vol. 7 (Reprint of 1st ed.). San Francisco: The History Co.
9. Burdon, John Alder (1931). Archives of British Honduras. Vol. 1 (1st ed.). London: Sifton, Praed & Co. OCLC 3046003.
10. Burdon, John Alder (1934). Archives of British Honduras. Vol. 2 (1st ed.). London: Sifton, Praed & Co. OCLC 3046003.
11. Burdon, John Alder (1935). Archives of British Honduras. Vol. 3 (1st ed.). London: Sifton, Praed & Co. OCLC 3046003.
12. Calderón Quijano, José Antonio (1944). Belice 1663 (?)-1821. Publicaciones de la Escuela de Estudios Hispano-Americanos de la Universidad de Sevilla. Vol. 5 (1st ed.). Seville: Escuela de Estudios Hispano-Americanos. OCLC 2481064.
13. Cárdenas Valencia, Francisco de (1937). Relación historial eclesiástica de la provincia de Yucatán de la Nueva España, escrita el año de 1639. Biblioteca histórica mexicana de obras inéditas. Vol. 3 (1st ed.). Mexico City: Antigua Librería Robredo, J. Porrúa e Hijos. OCLC 4660610.
14. Cardona Amaya, José Manuel (2020). Invasiones de corsarios a la Honduras de Felipe IV (1633-1643) (1st ed.). Tegucigalpa: Universidad Nacional Autónoma de Honduras. ISBN 9789992612620.
15. Chamberlain, Robert Stoner (1948). The conquest and colonization of Yucatan, 1517–1550. Carnegie Institution of Washington Publication. Vol. 582 (1st ed.). Washington, DC: Carnegie Institution of Washington. hdl:2027/txu.059173008409431.
16. Chamberlain, Robert Stoner (1966) [First published 1953 as Carnegie Publication 598]. The conquest and colonization of Honduras, 1502–1550. Carnegie Institution of Washington publicationno. 598 (Reprint of 1st ed.). New York: Octagon Books. hdl:2027/txu.059173002179226.
17. Cockburn, John (1735). A journey over land, from the Gulf of Honduras to the great South-Sea. Performed by John Cockburn, and five other Englishmen, viz. Thomas Rounce, Richard Banister, John Holland, Thomas Robinson, and John Ballman; Who were taken by a Spanish Guarda-Costa, in the John and Jane, Edward Burt Master, and set on Shoar at a Place called Forto-Cavalo, naked and wounded, as mentioned in several News-Papers of October, 1731. Containing, Variety of extraordinary Distresses and Adventures, and some New and Useful Discoveries of the Inland of those almost unknown Parts of America: As also, An exact Account of the Manners, Customs, and Behaviour of the several Indians inhabiting a Tract of Land of 2400 Miles; particularly of their Dispositions towards the Spaniards and English. To which is added, a curious piece, written in the reign of King James I. and never before printed, intitled, A brief discoverye of some things best worth noteinge in the travells of Nicholas Withington, a Factor in the East-Indiase (1st ed.). London: Printed for C. Rivington, at the Bible and Crown in St. Paul's Church yard. OCLC 642287768.
18. Crawford, Michael J., ed. (1996). Naval Documents of the American Revolution. Vol. 10 (1st ed.). Washington, DC: Naval History Center of the Department of the Navy.
19. Dampier, William (1700) [First published 1699]. Voyages and descriptions, in three parts : to which is added a general index to both volumes. Vol. 2 (2nd ed.). Printed for James Knapton, at the Crown in St Paul's Church-yard. ProQuest 2264207852.
20. De la O Torres, Rodrigo Alejandro (2020). DE CORSARIOS, MARES Y COSTAS : El corso en la construcción del espacio y experiencias marítimas en el Golfo-Caribe, 1527-1620 (1st ed.). Ciudad Universitaria, Aguascalientes: Universidad Autónoma de Aguascalientes. OCLC 1280054563.
21. Fernández Duro, Cesário (1899). Armada española desde la unión de los reinos de Castilla y de León. Vol. 5 (1st ed.). Madrid: Est. tipográfico "Sucesores de Rivadeneyra". OCLC 4413652.
22. Figueroa, Alejandro J.; Johnson, Erlend; Goodwin, Whitney A., eds. (2021). Southeastern Mesoamerica : indigenous interaction, resilience, and change (1st ed.). Louisville, Colorado: University Press of Colorado. OCLC 1226797442.
23. Fortescue, J. W., ed. (1899). Calendar of State Papers Colonial, America and West Indies. Vol. 12 (1st ed.). London: Her Majesty's Stationery Office.
24. Fuentes y Guzmán, F. A. (1933). Recordación florida: discurso historial y demostración natural, material, militar y política del reyno de Guatemala. Biblioteca "Goathemala" de la Sociedad de Geografía e Historia de Guatemala Vol. 7. Vol. 2 (1st ed.). Tipografía nacional. OCLC 3576677.
25. García Bernal, Manuela Cristina (2018). "Francisco de Montejo". Diccionario Biográfico electrónico. Real Academia de la Historia.
26. García Paláez, Francisco de Paula (1852). Memorias para la historia del antiguo reyno de Guatemala. Vol. 2 (1st ed.). Guatemala City: Establecimiento tip. de L. Luna.
27. Gerhard, Peter (1979). The Southeast Frontier of New Spain (1st ed.). Princeton, NJ: Princeton University Press. OCLC 4529742.
28. Gibbs, Archibald R. (1883). British Honduras: an historical and descriptive account of the colony from its settlement, 1670 (1st ed.). London: Sampson Low, Marston, Searle & Rivington.
29. González Díaz, Falia; Lázaro de la Escosura, Pilar, eds. (2009). Mare clausum mare liberum : la pirateria en la América española (1st ed.). Madrid: Ministerio de Cultura. OCLC 609110024.
30. González Ochoa, José María (2018). "Alonso González Dávila". Diccionario Biográfico electrónico. Real Academia de la Historia.
31. Goslinga, Cornelis Christiaan (1971). The Dutch in the Caribbean and on the Wild Coast 1580-1680. Anjerpublikaties. Vol. 12 (1st ed.). Assen: van Gorcum. OCLC 186239.
32. Graham, Elizabeth A. (2011). Maya Christians and Their Churches in Sixteenth-Century Belize. Maya Studies (1st ed.). Gainesville, FL: University Press of Florida. ISBN 9780813040721. OCLC 751694131.
33. Green, Mary Anne Everett, ed. (1858). Calendar of State Papers Domestic: James I, 1619-23 (1st ed.). London: Her Majesty's Stationery Office.
34. Green, Mary Anne Everett, ed. (1861). Calendar of State Papers Domestic: Charles II, 1661-2 (1st ed.). London: Her Majesty's Stationery Office.
35. Hakluyt, Richard, ed. (1600). The principal nauigations, voiages, traffiques and discoueries of the English nation made by sea or ouer-land, to the remote and farthest distant quarters of the earth, at any time within the compasse of these 1500. yeeres: deuided into three seuerall volumes, according to the positions of the regions, whereunto they were directed. Vol. III (2nd expanded ed.). London: George Bishop, Ralfe Newberie, & Robert Barker. OCLC 252871354. ProQuest Doc. No. 2248550788.
36. Haring, Clarence Henry (1910). Buccaneers in the West Indies in the Seventeenth Century (1st ed.). London: Methuen & Co.
37. Huerga, Álvaro, ed. (2010). Cartas de los gobernadores. Vol. 1 (1st ed.). San Juan, Puerto Rico: Academia Puertorriqueña de la Historia : Centro de Estudios Avanzados de Puerto Rico y del Caribe : Fundación Puertorriqueña de las Humanidades. OCLC 700460564.
38. Jameson, John Franklin, ed. (1923). Privateering and Piracy in the Colonial Period: Illustrative Documents. Library of American Civilization (1st ed.). New York: Macmillan. OCLC 2778131.
39. Johnson, Charles, ed. (1724a). A general history of the robberies and murders of the most notorious pyrates, and also their policies, discipline and government, from their first rise and settlement in the island of Providence, in 1717, to the present Year 1724 (1st ed.). London: Printed for Ch. Rivington at the Dille and Crown in St. Paul's Church-Yard, J. Lacy at the Shop near the Temple-Gate, and J. Stone next the Crown Coffee-House the back of Greys-Inn.
40. Johnson, Charles, ed. (1724b). A general history of the pyrates, from their first rise and settlement in the island of Providence, to the present Time (2nd expanded ed.). London: Printed for, and sold by T. Warner, at the Black-Boy in Pater-Noster-Row.
41. Jones, Grant D. (1989). Maya resistance to Spanish rule: time and history on a colonial frontier (1st ed.). Albuquerque, NM: University of New Mexico Press. ISBN 082631161X. OCLC 20012099.
42. Jones, Grant D. (1998). Conquest of the Last Maya Kingdom (1st ed.). Stanford, CA: Stanford University Press. hdl:2027/heb.03515. OCLC 38747674.
43. Juarres, D. (1818). Compendio de la historia de la ciudad de Guatemala. Vol. 2 (1st ed.). Guatemala City: Por D. Ignacio Beteta.
44. Kupperman, Karen Ordahl (1993). Providence Island, 1630-1641 (1st ed.). Cambridge: Cambridge University Press. hdl:2027/heb.00270. ISBN 0521352053. OCLC 958556236.
45. Laet, Joannes de (1916) [First published 1644 by Bonaventure & Abraham Elsevier in Leiden]. Historie ofte iaerlijck verhael van de verrichtinghen der geoctroyeerde West-Indische Compagnie, zedert haer begin, tot het eynde van 't jaer sesthien-hondert ses-en-dertich; begrepen in derthien boecken, ende met verscheyden koperen platen verciert [Historia ou annaes dos feitos da Companhia privilegiada das Indias occidentaes desde o seu começo até ao fim do anno de 1636]. Historie ofte iaerlijck verhael van de verrichtinghen der Geoctroyeerde West-Indische compagnie.Portuguese. Vol. 1. Translated by Duarte Pereira, Jose Hygino; Souto Maior, Pedro. Rio de Janeiro: Officinas Graphicas da Bibliotheca Nacional. hdl:2027/coo.31924020373316.
46. Laet, Joannes de (1925) [First published 1644 by Bonaventure & Abraham Elsevier in Leiden]. Historie ofte iaerlijck verhael van de verrichtinghen der geoctroyeerde West-Indische Compagnie, zedert haer begin, tot het eynde van 't jaer sesthien-hondert ses-en-dertich; begrepen in derthien boecken, ende met verscheyden koperen platen verciert [Historia ou annaes dos feitos da Companhia privilegiada das Indias occidentaes desde o seu começo até ao fim do anno de 1636]. Historie ofte iaerlijck verhael van de verrichtinghen der Geoctroyeerde West-Indische compagnie.Portuguese. Vol. 2. Translated by Duarte Pereira, Jose Hygino; Souto Maior, Pedro. Rio de Janeiro: Officinas Graphicas da Bibliotheca Nacional. hdl:2027/njp.32101068325834.
47. Laet, Joannes de (1937) [First published 1644 by Bonaventure & Abraham Elsevier in Leiden]. Naber, S. P. l'Honoré (ed.). Historie ofte iaerlijck verhael van de verrichtinghen der geoctroyeerde West-Indische Compagnie, zedert haer begin, tot het eynde van 't jaer sesthien-hondert ses-en-dertich; begrepen in derthien boecken, ende met verscheyden koperen platen verciert. Vol. 4. Hague: Mart. Nijhoff.
48. Latimer, Jon (2009). Buccaneers of the Caribbean (1st ed.). Cambridge, MA: Harvard University Press. doi:10.4159/9780674054172. ISBN 9780674054172.
49. Levy, Pablo (1873) [First published 1871 in French]. Notas geográficas y económicas sobre la República de Nicaragua (Translation of 1st ed.). Paris: E. Denné Schmitz. OCLC 2309283.
50. López de Cogolludo, Diego (1688). Historia de Yucathan (1st ed.). Madrid: Por Jvan Garcia Infanzen. OCLC 85799316.
51. Luján Muñoz, Jorge (2005) [First published 1994]. Historia general de Guatemala. Vol. 2 (Reprint of 1st ed.). Guatemala City: Asociación de Amigos del País & Fundación para la Cultura y el Desarollo. OCLC 499047798. Archived from the original on 24 February 2023.
52. Luján Muñoz, Jorge (2005a) [First published 1995]. Historia general de Guatemala. Vol. 3 (Reprint of 1st ed.). Guatemala City: Asociación de Amigos del País & Fundación para la Cultura y el Desarollo. OCLC 499047798. Archived from the original on 29 August 2023.
53. MacLeod, Murdo J. (1973). Spanish Central America: A Socioeconomic History, 1520–1720. Campus. Vol. 119 (1st ed.). Berkeley, CA: University of California Press. ISBN 0520021371. OCLC 762163.
54. Makepeace, Margaret (23 September 2004). "Parker, William". Oxford Dictionary of National Biography (online ed.). Oxford University Press. doi:10.1093/ref:odnb/21344. (Subscription, Wikipedia Library access or UK public library membership required.)
55. Marley, David F. (2008a) [First published 1998]. Wars of the Americas: a chronology of armed conflict in the New World, 1492 to the present. Vol. 1 (2nd expanded ed.). Santa Barbara, CA: ABC-CLIO. OCLC 180907562.
56. Marley, David F. (2008b) [First published 1998]. Wars of the Americas: a chronology of armed conflict in the New World, 1492 to the present. Vol. 2 (2nd expanded ed.). Santa Barbara, CA: ABC-CLIO. OCLC 180907562.
57. Marley, David F. (2010a). Pirates of the Americas. Vol. 1 (1st ed.). Santa Barbara, CA: ABC-CLIO. OCLC 681548480.
58. Marley, David F. (2010b). Pirates of the Americas. Vol. 2 (1st ed.). Santa Barbara, CA: ABC-CLIO. OCLC 681548480.
59. Molina Solís, Juan Francisco (1910). Historia de Yucatán durante la dominación española. Vol. 2 (1st ed.). Merida, Yuc.: Impr. de la Loteria del estado. OCLC 13381125.
60. Molina Solís, Juan Francisco (1913). Historia de Yucatán durante la dominación española. Vol. 3 (1st ed.). Merida, Yuc.: Impr. de la Loteria del estado.
61. Morgan, William James, ed. (1976). Naval Documents of the American Revolution. Vol. 7 (1st ed.). Washington, DC: Naval History Division of the Department of the Navy.
62. Newton, Arthur Percival (1914). The colonising activities of the English Puritans: the last phase of the Elizabethan struggle with Spain. Yale Historical Publications: Miscellany. Vol. 1 (1st ed.). New Haven, CT: Yale University Press. hdl:2027/hvd.32044014678932. OCLC 2993127.
63. Pardo, Juan Joaquín (1944). Efemérides de la Antigua Guatemala, 1541-1779 (1st ed.). Guatemala City: Unión Tipográfica. OCLC 09322357.
64. Raiswell, Richard (23 September 2004). "Sherley [Shirley], Anthony [known as Sir Anthony Sherley], Count Sherley in the nobility of the Holy Roman empire". Oxford Dictionary of National Biography (online ed.). Oxford University Press. doi:10.1093/ref:odnb/25423. (Subscription, Wikipedia Library access or UK public library membership required.)
65. Raithby, John, ed. (1819a). Statutes of the Realm. Vol. 4.
66. Raithby, John, ed. (1819b). Statutes of the Realm. Vol. 5. Great Britain Record Commission.
67. Ransome, David R. (23 September 2004). "Newport, Christopher". Oxford Dictionary of National Biography (online ed.). Oxford University Press. doi:10.1093/ref:odnb/20032. (Subscription, Wikipedia Library access or UK public library membership required.)
68. Rodríguez del Valle, Mariana (1960). El Castillo de San Felipe del Golfo Dulce: historia de las fortificaciones de Guatemala en la edad moderna. Publicaciones de la Escuela de Estudios Hispano-Americanos de la Universidad de Sevilla. Vol. 136 (1st ed.). Sevilla: Escuela de Estudios Hispano-Americanos. OCLC 33173663.
69. Rojas Lima, Flavio, ed. (2004). Diccionario histórico biográfico de Guatemala. Enciclopedia Guatemala (1st ed.). Guatemala City: Fundación para la Cultura y el Desarrollo & Asociación de Amigos del País. OCLC 58734025. Archived from the original on 30 July 2017.
70. Rubio Sánchez, Manuel (1987). Historia del Ejército de Guatemala. Colección historia militar : serie documentos militares. Vol. 1 (1st ed.). Guatemala City: Editorial del Ejército. ISBN 082631161X. OCLC 17770703.
71. Sainsbury, W. Noel, ed. (1880). Calendar of State Papers Colonial, America and West Indies. Vol. 5 (1st ed.). London: Her Majesty's Stationery Office.
72. Sainsbury, W. Noel, ed. (1889). Calendar of State Papers Colonial, America and West Indies. Vol. 7 (1st ed.). London: Her Majesty's Stationery Office.
73. Sainsbury, W. Noel; Fortescue, J. W., eds. (1896). Calendar of State Papers Colonial, America and West Indies. Vol. 10 (1st ed.). London: Her Majesty's Stationery Office.
74. Sharer, Robert J.; Traxler, Loa P., eds. (2006). The Ancient Maya (6th ed.). Stanford, CA: Stanford University Press. ISBN 0804748160.
75. Sloane, H. (1707). A voyage to the islands Madera, Barbados, Nieves, S. Christophers and Jamaica, with the natural history of the Herbs and Trees, Four-Footed Beasts, Fishes, Birds, Insects, Reptiles, &c. of the last of those islands; to which is prefix'd an introduction, wherein is an account of the inhabitants, air, waters, diseases, trade, &c. of that Place, with some Relations concerning the Neighbouring Continent, and Islands of America. Illustrated with the figures of the things describ'd, which have not been heretofore engraved; In large Copper-Plates as big as the Life. Vol. 1 (1st ed.). London: Printed by B.M. for the author.
76. Sloane, H. (1725). A voyage to the islands Madera, Barbados, Nieves, S. Christophers and Jamaica, with the natural history of the Herbs and Trees, Four-Footed Beasts, Fishes, Birds, Insects, Reptiles, &c. of the last of those islands; to which is prefix'd an introduction, wherein is an account of the inhabitants, air, waters, diseases, trade, &c. of that Place, with some Relations concerning the Neighbouring Continent, and Islands of America. Illustrated with the figures of the things describ'd, which have not been heretofore engraved; In large Copper-Plates as big as the Life. Vol. 2 (1st ed.). London: Printed by B.M. for the author.
77. Varela Marcos, Jesús (2018a). "Juan Díaz de Solís". Diccionario Biográfico electrónico. Real Academia de la Historia.
78. Varela Marcos, Jesús (2018b). "Vicente Yáñez Pinzón". Diccionario Biográfico electrónico. Real Academia de la Historia.
79. Wilson, David (2021). Suppressing Piracy in the Early Eighteenth Century: Pirates, Merchants and British Imperial Authority in the Atlantic and Indian Oceans (1st ed.). Woodbridge: Boydell Press. doi:10.2307/j.ctv1850j4g. OCLC 1237867246. S2CID 242727447.
80. Wright, Irene A., ed. (1929). Spanish documents concerning English voyages to the Caribbean, 1527-1568. Works issued by the Hakluyt Society; 2nd ser., no. 62 (1st ed.). London: Printed for the Hakluyt Society. OCLC 2092435.
81. Wright, Irene A., ed. (1932). Documents concerning English voyages to the Spanish main, 1569-1580. Works issued by the Hakluyt Society; 2nd ser., no. 71 (1st ed.). London: Printed for the Hakluyt Society. hdl:2027/mdp.39015012306133. OCLC 1476408.
82. Wright, Irene A., ed. (1951). Further English voyages to Spanish America, 1583-1594 : documents from the Archives of the Indies at Seville illustrating English voyages to the Caribbean, the Spanish Main, Florida, and Virginia. Works issued by the Hakluyt Society; 2nd ser., no. 99 (1st ed.). London: Printed for the Hakluyt Society. hdl:2027/mdp.39015026881790. OCLC 1476734.
83. Wright, Irene A., ed. (1935). Nederlandsche zeevaarders op de eilanden in de Caraïbische zee en aan de kust van Columbia en Venezuela gedurende de jaren 1621-1648(9) Documenten hoofdzakelijk uit het Archivo general de Indias te Sevilla. Vol. 2. Translated by Dam, Cornelis F. A. van (1st ed.). Utrecht: Kemink en Zoon.
