= 1640s in piracy =

This timeline of the history of piracy in the 1640s is a chronological list of key events involving pirates between 1640 and 1649.

== Events ==
=== 1640 ===
- António Vieira, a Portuguese Jesuit, publishes a document denouncing the actions of the West India Company which employed privateers to attack Spanish and Portuguese shipping in the West Indies. Between 1623 and 1637, 609 ships were captured by privateering activities on the WIC.
- Brother Frederico Lan-Gravio D'Assia, Captain General of Galleys for the Knights of Malta, with two galleys, raids the Barbary coast and captures several oared vessels and the 46-gun Kara Cogia.
- A group of fifty French Calvinists led by engineer François le Vasseur leave St. Kitts and eventually arrive in Tortuga. Driving out the local Spanish inhabitants, the colonists begin the construction of a fort on the southeast end of the island overlooking the harbor. Cutting steps into the rock cliff and used an iron ladder to reach the top of the cliff when the angle of the steps became to steep to climb. Building a near impregnable fortress called the Dove-cote, the fort was built to be inaccessible save for the steps cut into the rock cliff and an iron ladder to reach the top of the cliff when the angle of the steps became to steep to climb. The Calvinists successfully defended the island as the Spanish returned later that year sinking several ships before retreating.
- Spanish colonial authorities in Hispaniola launch a campaign to drive out the pirates gathered in Tortuga, of whom were predominantly English and French, in an attempt to put a stop to the constant attacks on Spanish shipping in the West Indies. Although initially successful, the island would become a major haven for pirates later known as buccaneers throughout the late-1650s when Col. Edward Doyley invited the inhabitants to operate from Jamaica.
- May – A second attempt by the Spanish to capture the English Providence Island colony, a joint Spanish/Portuguese fleet consisting of 700 men and thirteen ships including the Black Robin (the former HMS Robert, the captured flagship of the Earl of Warwick), is led by Sergeant Major Antonio Maldonado de Texeda. Although founded by Puritans who had left the Massachusetts Bay Colony, the island was regarded as a "den of thievery" by Captain General of Cartagena Melchor de Aguilera and was used as a stopping point by privateers due to its natural harbors and close proximity to Cartagena and Portobello. English privateer William Jackson had visited the island earlier that year before returning to England by the end of winter.

=== 1641 ===
- Ali Bitchnin Reis, a wealthy Barbary corsair, while leading seven warships, lost hundreds of men to one Dutch sailing ship.
- Samuel Axe escapes to Saint Kitts to avoid the Spanish occupation of Providence Island.

=== 1642 ===
- Brother Gabrielle Chambres de Boisbaudrant becomes Captain General of Galleys for the Knights of Malta.
- France and Algiers negotiate peace treaties but both fail to enforce them.
- Axe becomes second-in-command to William Jackson.

=== 1643 ===
- Ali Bitchnin Reis, after demanding the Ottoman sultan pay in advance for Algerian support during wartime and failing to get support from the Janissary, fled Algiers but was persuaded to return, dying soon after.
- William Cobb and William Ayres, English pirates, are briefly imprisoned.

=== 1644 ===
- Abraham Blauvelt (sometimes Blewfield), a Dutch pirate, after assuming command of his own ship, begins raiding Spanish shipping coming from Dutch New Amsterdam and southwestern Jamaica in a port now called Blewfields Bay.
- Due to the Ming dynasty being driven out, Zheng Zhilong, a Chinese pirate, sets up a Ming emperor in his province, Fukien.
- September - Boisbaudrant, with six galleys, attacks a heavily armed Ottoman galleon weighing over 1,100 tons containing the Sultan's favorite wife and their son. The captured galleon sinks off the coast of southern Italy and the Sultan's favorite wife dies soon after arriving in Malta.

=== 1645 ===
- Axe ends his tenure as second-in-command to William Jackson.
- Sultan Ibrahim, the Ottoman sultan at the time, attacks Crete, then owned by Venice, due to Boisbaudrant's actions and usage of Venetian ports.

=== 1646 ===
- A treaty is enacted by British and Algerian forces but fails to end raids by corsairs from both nations.

=== 1647 ===
- January - Bekir Reis, a Barbary corsair, commanding a 22-gun ship, gets captured by six galleys of the Knights of Malta near Sicily.

=== 1648 ===
- Blauvelt was no longer welcomed in New Amsterdam as the Dutch had made peace with Spain.

=== 1649 ===
- After Blauvelt disposes of his loot in Rhode Island the governor declares one of his prizes to be illegal but lacks the power to enforce said declaration.

== Arts and literature ==
=== 1640 ===
- Francis Knight's A Relation of Seven Yeares Slaverie Under the Turkes of Argeire, suffered by an English Captive Merchant is published.

== Births ==
=== 1640 ===
- Chevalier D'Hocquincourt of the Knights of Malta
- John Narborough, English navigator and admiral who took part in a privateering expedition against the Spanish in the South Seas between 1669 and 1671.

== Deaths ==
=== 1643 ===
- Ali Bitchnin Reis, likely due to poison.
- August - Hendick Brouwer

=== 1649 ===
- Robert Dudley, an English explorer.
