= Edward Neville (pirate) =

English pirate

- Piratical career
- Allegiance: France (privateering commission)
- Years active: 1675–1678
- Rank: Buccaneer; privateer
- Commands: Sloop (unnamed)
- Battles: Sack of Campeche (1678)
- Later work: Possibly judge in Jamaica (1698)

Edward Neville (Note: Last name occasionally spelled Nevil, Nevill, or Nevile.) (fl. 1675–1678) was an English buccaneer and pirate. He is best known for joining George Spurre to raid Spanish Campeche.

== History ==
After England withdrew from the Franco-Dutch War in 1674, Neville accepted a French privateering commission to sail against Spain. Jamaican Governor John Vaughan tried to recall English privateers to maintain England's neutrality in the continuing war but had little success. In 1675 he accused legendary buccaneer Henry Morgan – now pardoned, and promoted to become Vaughan's own Deputy Governor – of writing to Neville and other privateers, promising them pardons and freedom. Morgan wrote, “and to all others acting under French Commissions as well English as French … they are welcome to this island and shall have all the privileges they ever had and Port Royal is free to them.”

Neville continued operating under his French commission, partnering with George Spurre in 1678 to sack Campeche. After capturing a few ships off Cuba that April and recruiting more men, they sailed to Campeche in July and anchored offshore at night. Neville took his sloop into the harbor to spy on Spanish defenses; reporting back to Spurre that the city was ripe for conquest, they attacked by stealth early the next morning. The defenders were caught unawares and the pirates quickly captured the town, looting it for two days and taking three Spanish ships with them before withdrawing. Future Governor William Beeston noted their return to Jamaica in October 1678, where they were pardoned for their privateering and free to spend their booty.

Spanish Provincial Governor Antonio de Layseca y Alvarado was removed from office for failing to defend Campeche, though he was later reinstated. In retaliation he ordered Spanish forces (privateer and pirate Juan Corso among them) to capture or drive off English logwood cutters in his territory. An “Edward Neville” was still living on Jamaica as of 1698, where he was employed as a judge; it is unknown if this was the buccaneer Neville, though other ex-pirates such as Morgan, George Dew, and Josiah Burgess retired from piracy to serve in similar capacities.

== See also ==
- Jacob Hall (pirate) – Another English buccaneer who sailed with George Spurre.
