= William Rous =

17th-century English privateer

- Born: fl. 1631; England
- Died: 1645
- Piratical career
- Type: Privateer
- Allegiance: Netherlands
- Years active: 1630s–1640s
- Rank: Captain
- Base of operations: Providence Island

William Rous (fl. 1631–1645) was a 17th-century English privateer in the service of the Providence Island Company. He was later enlisted by William Jackson to accompany him on a privateering expedition to the West Indies.

== Biography ==
A step-nephew of John Pym, William Rous was a lieutenant in the local militia in the Providence Island colony and later became commander of the local garrison at Fort Henry. In 1634, while still second-in-command under Captain William Rudyerd, he was involved in a dispute with the principal smith Thomas Forman and, losing his temper, he struck Forman in the presence of Governor Philip Bell. Rous was thereafter suspended both from the council table, his offices in militia training and his duties at Fort Henry until he acknowledged his fault. Being dismissed from office would have meant humiliation and disgrace to him as a gentleman, however, agreeing to make public confession of guilt would have caused him even deeper humiliation. Matters were further complicated when Bell attempted to return him to his seat without making a public apology. The Providence Island Company overruled Bell, adding that he had "acted in an undue manner", although his suspension was not to include his training the militia.

In 1636, he was given a privateering commission and letter of marque by the PIC. In command of the Blessing, and accompanied by a pinnace, he and the Expectation had planned to attack Santa Marta. However, when the Expectation was becalmed, he instead entered the harbor alone on October 20, 1636. The Spanish had been warned of his attack and were prepared for him when he arrived. Losing several men, Rous and the others surrendered after a brief fight and were taken overland to Cartagena, where he and his crew were imprisoned. Transported to Sanlúcar, Spain, he was eventually released due to the efforts of the English ambassador.

In 1642, he left England to join William Jackson as an officer in his privateering expedition to the West Indies. Alongside fellow privateers such as Samuel Axe and Lewis Morris, Rous spent the next three years raiding Spanish settlements throughout the Caribbean, including Spanish Town, Jamaica in 1644.
