= George Spurre =

English buccaneer

George Spurre (Note: First name Jorge in Spanish sources. Last name occasionally Splure, Spargh, or in Spanish accounts, “D’Elsurra.”) (fl. 1678–1683) was an English pirate and buccaneer. He is best known for sacking Campeche and for joining a large buccaneer force which captured Veracruz.

== History ==
In early 1678 Spurre joined with Edward Neville off the coast of Cuba, using a French privateering commission to capture two Spanish vessels. They collected additional crew before sailing to Campeche in July 1678. Neville and Spurre attacked the city at night, slipping past the garrison using captured guides, and captured it with little resistance. After several days of looting they left with ransoms, captured ships, and hundreds of slaves. Spurre returned to Jamaica in October, where he spent a few years as a trader. Spanish forces (including privateer and pirate Juan Corso) retaliated by seizing the camps and ships of logwood cutters on the Campeche coast.

By 1682 he was again known to the Spanish as a pirate, and in early 1683 joined a large buccaneer fleet preparing to raid Veracruz. Among the fleet's leaders were Nicholas van Hoorn, Michel de Grammont, Jan Willems, Laurens de Graaf, and Michiel Andrieszoon. Spurre was one of only two English captains in the assembly, the other being Jacob Hall. That May they attacked by surprise and captured the city easily, looting it for several days. Spurre located the cowering Governor and saved him from angry Frenchmen, netting the buccaneers a huge ransom: “[they] had seventy thousand pieces of Eight for the Governour Don Luis de Cordoua's Ransome, which Spurre found hid amongst Grass in a Stable.” The buccaneers scattered afterwards; Hall sailed to Carolina but Spurre left for French Saint-Domingue, where he died soon after. Some months later Jamaican Governor Thomas Lynch seized Spurre's sloop and the goods aboard it, netting £1,175 in buccaneer plunder.

== See also ==
- Francois Grogniet – One of the other French captains who joined the Veracruz expedition.
