= Juan Corso =

Corsican pirate

- Born: Giovanni Michele
- Occupation: Privateer
- Years active: 1680-1685
- Piratical career
- Type: Guarda costa
- Allegiance: For the Spanish

Juan Corso (Note: His real name was likely Giovanni Michele. “Corso” is a real last name, but it also means “Corsair” or "Privateer" in Spanish, and so may have been an alias. He is best known by "Juan Corso" (also spelled Corzo, Costa, and de Costa) and period records refer to him as such.) (died 1685) was a Corsican pirate and guarda costa privateer who sailed in Spanish service, operating out of Campeche and later of Cuba.

Corso was an eminent privateer of his era despite the brevity of his career, taking over 50 vessels in only five years and leading raids on French and English colonies. According to author Benerson Little, "he was as successful as many English, French and Dutch pirates, and was more successful--and far more cruel--than many pirates who are far better known".

== History ==
Corso sailed alongside Spanish privateer Pedro de Castro under commander Felipe de la Barreda y Villegas in April 1680, rounding up Englishmen illegally harvesting logwood in the Laguna de Términos off Campeche, partially in retaliation for English buccaneers Edward Neville and George Spurre's 1678 sack of Campeche. They sailed the Yucatan coast and took a number of ships, one of which had earlier been captured from the Spanish by English buccaneer John Coxon.

Corso was known for his savagery: “The Spaniards killed two men and cruelly treated the deponent, hanging him up at the fore braces several times, beating him with their cutlasses, and striking him in the face after an inhuman cruel manner.” And later: “This Juan a month since took a boat of ours bound to New Providence; he has killed divers of our people in cold blood. In one case he cut off a man's head because he was sick and could not row so strongly as he expected. Barbarities like these and worse he commits daily.” He returned alone and was arrested when de Castro was suspected of piracy. Released in early 1681, he rejoined de Castro and patrolled off the Cuban coastline for the next two years.

Though Spanish settlements were threatened primarily by French buccaneers at the time, Corso repeatedly attacked English ships as well. English officials complained throughout 1683 and 1684 to Spanish Governors in Havana and elsewhere about Corso's piracy and his increasing brutality, as well as his attack on New Providence in the Bahamas, but were rebuffed. His actions also incensed French buccaneers, who threatened to sack Cuban towns in return.

In May 1685 Corso sailed again with de Castro to eliminate La Salle's new French colony on the Texas coastline. They were caught in storms and nearly driven ashore. After sending some men to look for the Frenchmen they sailed out again only to be caught in rough weather once more. Their ship was lost at sea with all hands, Corso included. The remainder of their expedition - just nine men - resorted to cannibalism to survive. A year later at least one of the ships he'd captured was retaken by English buccaneers and sailed into New York, where its Captain begged the government to seize it and return the vessel to its owners.

== See also ==
- Edmund Cooke, an English logwood cutter who joined Coxon's expedition after losing two ships to Spanish privateers.
