= Jacob Hall (pirate) =

English buccaneer

Jacob Hall (fl. 1683-1684) was an English buccaneer and pirate best known for joining a large Dutch and French attack on Spanish Veracruz.

== History ==
Nicholas van Hoorn organized a buccaneer raid of Veracruz in early 1683, armed with a privateering commission from the Governor of Santo Domingo. They were backed by other noted filibusters such as Michiel Andrieszoon, Michel de Grammont, Laurens de Graaf, and “Yankey” Willems. He was one of only two English leaders on the expedition, the other being George Spurre. Hall's brig and several others joined the expedition and thoroughly sacked the city that May. The raider fleet sailed south with their booty; Hall instead sailed north to Carolina, where he resupplied before sailing to Virginia.

Governor Thomas Lynch of Jamaica complained of Carolina harboring pirates, noting that the pirate Hall went to Carolina “where he is free, as all such are.” Grammont too had visited the Carolinas to sell off slaves taken at Veracruz. The Proprietor of Carolina, the Earl of Craven, replied that Hall had stayed there only briefly and had been operating under a valid privateering commission at the time. Genuine pirates, Craven claimed, had been hanged in chains. It had, in fact, been made illegal for English subjects to serve under foreign commanders, but Hall had been at sea when the act was passed and was not apprehended.

Hall hay have been the privateer ("one Hall, a ffellow of a worse character than Ham") granted a commission by Leeward Islands Governor Daniel Parke during Queen Anne's War, despite the fact that "they and everybody else knew him to be a very great villaine."

== See also ==
- Jacob Evertson – another buccaneer who also sailed with Jan “Yankey” Willems
- Thomas Paine – another buccaneer who also sailed with Michiel Andrieszoon
