= William Jackson (pirate) =

17th-century English privateer

William Jackson (fl. 1639–1645) was an English privateer who, based in Guanaja and Roatan, was in the service of the Providence Island Company from 1639 until around 1641. During that year, he captured a Spanish slave ship at the Honduran port of Trujillo and received a ransom of 8,000 pounds of indigo as well as 2,000 pieces-of-eight and two gold chains. Leaving the Providence Island Company, he sailed to England, where he sold sugar and indigo to obtain supplies for another privateering expedition and. Upon receiving a three-year letter of marque from the Earl of Warwick, he set sail in 1642 in command of a fleet including such prominent privateers as Samuel Axe, William Rous and Lewis Morris.

Although this William Jackson's later activities are not recorded, another Captain William Jackson reportedly led a small fleet consisting of over 1,000 buccaneers from St. Kitts and Barbados looting and plundering throughout the Spanish Main including looting the cities of Maracaibo and Trujillo during 1642 and 1643. Whether the two men are one and the same is unclear from traditional accounts, though both were in the same location at roughly the same period.

Anchoring in the harbor of present-day Kingston on March 25, Jackson led a party of 500 men against the nearby town of St. Jago de la Vega, which he captured after heavy resistance by the town's defenders at a cost of around forty men. Threatening to burn the town, he received a ransom of 200 cattle, 10,000 pounds of cassava bread, and 7,000 pieces-of-eight. Many of the English buccaneers became enamored with the tropical island and, during their stay, twenty three men left to live among the Spaniards.
