= Samuel Axe =

17th-century English privateer

Samuel Axe was an English privateer in Dutch service during the early 17th century.

Serving with English forces in the Netherlands during the Dutch War of Independence, Axe traveled to the British Providence Island colony in the western Caribbean Sea, where he assisted in the construction of its central fortress in 1629. However, after a disagreement with Daniel Elfrith (possibly over the capture of Spanish and Portuguese slavers during the early 1630s), Axe left the island with Abraham Blauvelt and Sussex Camock and sailed for Honduras in 1633.

In 1635, he accepted Dutch letters of marque despite being in the employ of the Providence Island Company and, from 1636 to 1641, acted as a privateer for the English trading company.

Although briefly returning to Providence to assist the island's defense against Spanish attacks in 1636, Axe had a successful privateering career delivering a captured prize, with cargo including gold, silver, jewels, indigo and cochineal, as he returned to England in May 1640.

Following the capture of Providence by the Spanish in 1641, the Providence Island Company was dissolved. Escaping to St. Kitts, Axe later took part in a privateering expedition under Captain William Jackson to the West Indies from 1642 to 1645, in which the privateers managed to capture Kingston, Jamaica.
