= Privateer =

Person or ship engaging in maritime warfare under commission

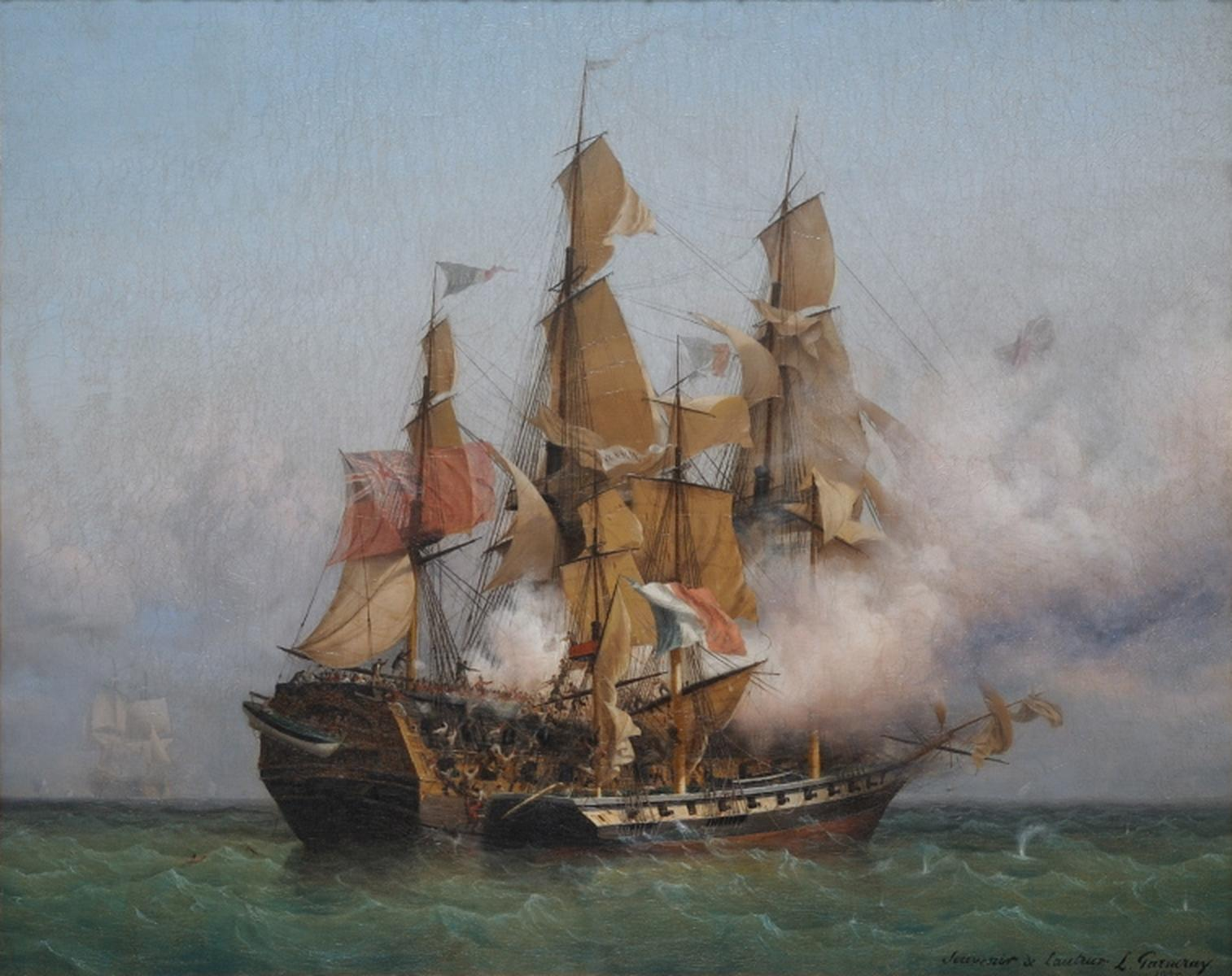
The French privateer Confiance (right) boarding the British East Indiaman Kent on 7 October 1800

A privateer is a private person or vessel which engages in commerce raiding under a commission of war. Since piracy was a common aspect of seaborne trade, until the early 19th century all merchant ships carried arms. A sovereign or delegated authority issued commissions, also referred to as letters of marque, during wartime. The commission empowered the holder to carry on all forms of hostility permissible at sea by the usages of war. This included attacking foreign vessels and taking them as prizes and taking crews prisoner for exchange. Captured ships were subject to condemnation and sale under prize law, with the proceeds divided by percentage between the privateer's sponsors, shipowners, captains and crew. A percentage share usually went to the issuer of the commission (i.e. the sovereign). Most colonial powers, as well as other countries, engaged in privateering.

Privateering allowed sovereigns to augment their naval forces at relatively low cost by mobilizing privately owned armed ships and sailors to supplement state power. For participants, privateering provided the potential for a greater income and profit than obtainable as a merchant seafarer or fisher while avoiding the dangers associated with outright piracy. However, the line between privateers and pirates was not always clear.

The commission usually protected privateers from accusations of piracy, but in practice the historical legality and status of privateers could be vague. Depending on the specific sovereign and the time period, commissions might be issued hastily; privateers might take actions beyond what was authorized in the commission, including after its expiry. A privateer who continued raiding after the expiration of a commission or the signing of a peace treaty could face accusations of piracy. The risk of piracy and the emergence of the modern state system of centralised military control caused the decline of privateering by the end of the 19th century.

== Legal framework and relation to piracy ==
1616 painting of an English privateer attacking a Dutch merchantman off La Rochelle

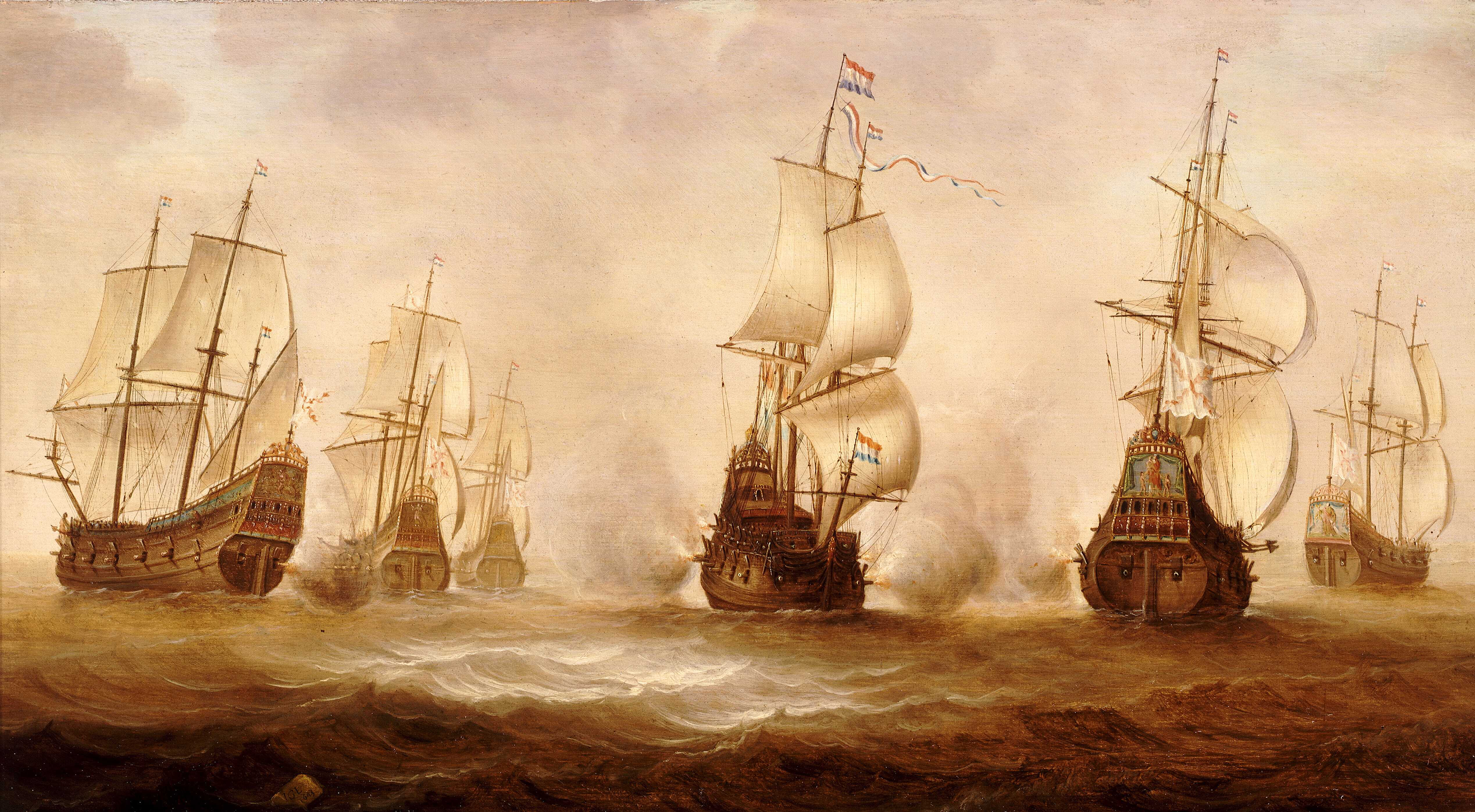
A Dutch squadron engaging the Dunkirkers off Nieuwpoort in 1640

The commission was the proof the privateer was not a pirate. It usually limited activity to one particular ship, and specified officers, for a specific period of time. Typically, the owners or captain would be required to post a performance bond. The commission also dictated the expected nationality of potential prize ships under the terms of the war. At sea, the privateer captain was obliged to produce the commission to a potential prize ship's captain as evidence of the legitimacy of their prize claim. If the nationality of a prize was not the enemy of the commissioning sovereign, the privateer could not claim the ship as a prize. Doing so would be an act of piracy.

In British law, under the Offences at Sea Act 1536, piracy, or raiding a ship without a valid commission, was an act of treason. By the late 17th century, the prosecution of privateers loyal to the usurped King James II for piracy began to shift the legal framework of piracy away from treason towards crime against property. As a result, privateering commissions became a matter of national discretion. By the passing of the Piracy Act 1717, a privateer's allegiance to Britain overrode any allegiance to a sovereign providing the commission. This helped bring privateers under the legal jurisdiction of their home country in the event the privateer turned pirate. Other European countries followed suit. The shift from treason to property also justified the criminalisation of traditional sea-raiding activities of people Europeans wished to colonise.

The legal framework around authorised sea-raiding was considerably murkier outside of Europe. Unfamiliarity with local forms of authority created difficulty determining who was legitimately sovereign on land and at sea, whether to accept their authority, or whether the opposing parties were, in fact, pirates. Mediterranean corsairs operated with a style of patriotic-religious authority that Europeans, and later Americans, found difficult to understand and accept. It did not help that many European privateers happily accepted commissions from the deys of Algiers, Tangiers and Tunis. The sultans of the Sulu archipelago (now present-day Philippines) held only a tenuous authority over the local Iranun communities of slave-raiders. The sultans created a carefully spun web of marital and political alliances in an attempt to control unauthorised raiding that would provoke war against them. In Malay political systems, the legitimacy and strength of their Sultan's management of trade determined the extent he exerted control over the sea-raiding of his coastal people.

Privateers were implicated in piracy for a number of complex reasons. For colonial authorities, successful privateers were skilled seafarers who brought in much-needed revenue, especially in newly settled colonial outposts. These skills and benefits often caused local authorities to overlook a privateer's shift into piracy when a war ended. The French Governor of Petit-Goave gave buccaneer Francois Grogniet blank privateering commissions, which Grogniet traded to Edward Davis for a spare ship so the two could continue raiding Spanish cities under a guise of legitimacy. New York Governors Jacob Leisler and Benjamin Fletcher were removed from office in part for their dealings with pirates such as Thomas Tew, to whom Fletcher had granted commissions to sail against the French, but who ignored his commission to raid Mughal shipping in the Red Sea instead.

Some privateers faced prosecution for piracy. William Kidd accepted a commission from King William III of England to hunt pirates but was later hanged for piracy. He had been unable to produce the papers of the prizes he had captured to prove his innocence.

Privateering commissions were easy to obtain during wartime but when the war ended and sovereigns recalled the privateers, many refused to give up the lucrative business and turned to piracy. Boston minister Cotton Mather lamented after the execution of pirate John Quelch:

Yea, since the privateering stroke so easily degenerates into the piratical and the privateering trade is usually carried on with so un-Christian a temper and proves an inlet unto so much debauchery and iniquity and confusion, I believe I shall have good men concur with me in wishing that privateering may no more be practised except there may appear more hopeful circumstances to encourage it.

== Noted privateers ==
John Hawkins (left) with Francis Drake (centre) and Thomas Cavendish

Privateers who were considered legitimate by their governments include:

- Miguel Enríquez (Spanish Empire)
- Pieter van der Does (Dutch Empire)
- Amaro Pargo (Spanish Empire)
- Hayreddin Barbarossa (Ottoman Empire)
- Robert Surcouf (France)
- Lars Gathenhielm (Sweden)
- Sir Francis Drake (England)
- Jonathan Barnet (England)
- Sir John Hawkins (England)
- Juana Larando (Spanish Empire)
- Jean Bart (France)

== Ships ==
Entrepreneurs converted many different types of vessels into privateers, including obsolete warships and refitted merchant ships. The investors would arm the vessels and recruit large crews, much larger than a merchantman or a naval vessel would carry, to crew the prizes they captured. Privateers generally cruised independently, but it was not unknown for them to form squadrons, or to co-operate with the regular navy. A number of privateers were part of the English fleet that opposed the Spanish Armada in 1588. Privateers generally avoided encounters with warships, as such encounters would be at best unprofitable. Still, such encounters did occur. For instance, in 1815 Chasseur encountered HMS St Lawrence, herself a former American privateer, mistaking her for a merchantman until too late; in this instance, however, the privateer prevailed.

The United States used mixed squadrons of frigates and privateers in the American Revolutionary War. Following the French Revolution, French privateers became a menace to British and American shipping in the western Atlantic and the Caribbean, resulting in the Quasi-War, a brief conflict between France and the United States, fought largely at sea, and to the Royal Navy's procuring Bermuda sloops to combat the French privateers.

== Overall history ==
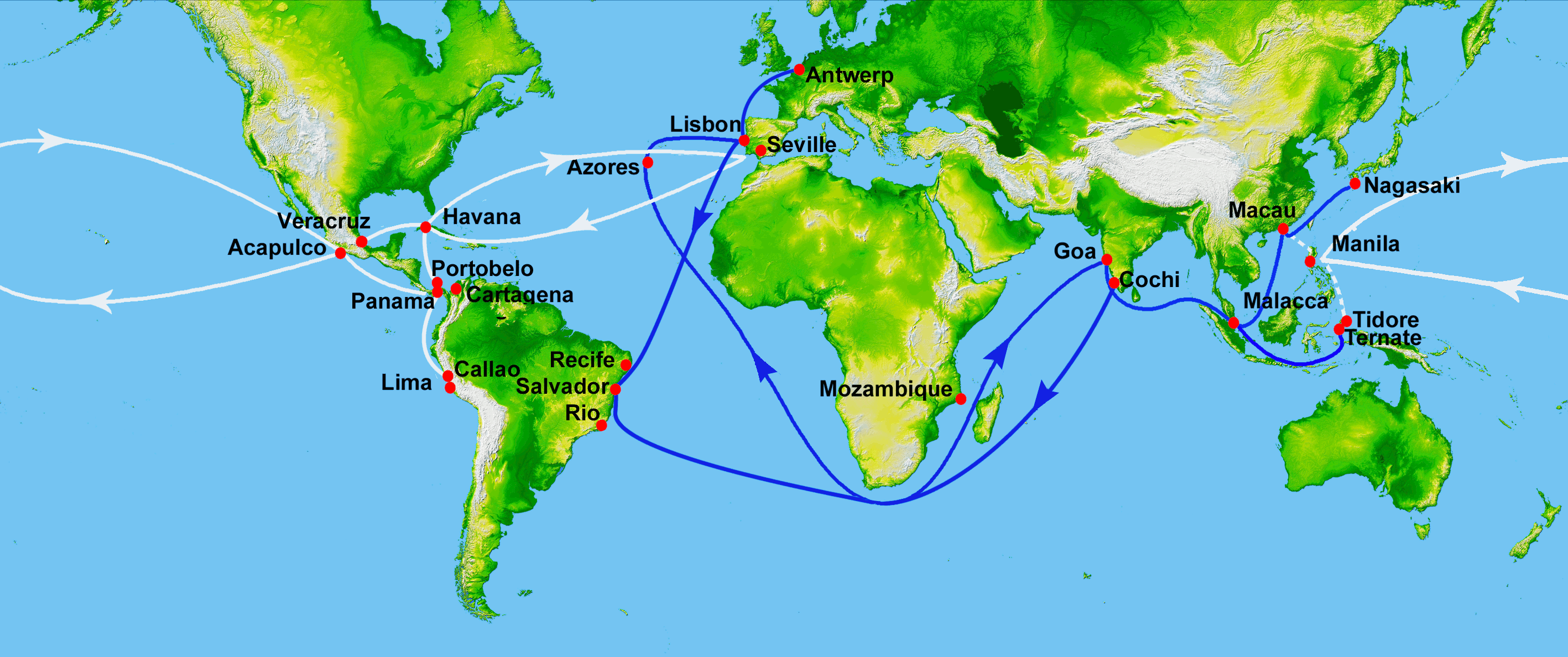
16th-century trade routes prey to privateering: Spanish treasure fleets linking the Caribbean to Seville, Manila-Acapulco galleons started in 1568 (white) and rival Portuguese India Armadas of 1498–1640 (blue)

In Europe, the practice of authorising sea-raiding dated to at least the 13th century but the word 'privateer' was coined sometime in the mid-17th century. Seamen who served on naval vessels were paid wages and given victuals, whereas mariners on merchantmen and privateers received a share of the takings. Privateering thus offered otherwise working-class enterprises (merchant ships) with the chance at substantial wealth (prize money from captures). The opportunity mobilized local seamen as auxiliaries in an era when state capacity limited the ability of a nation to fund a professional navy via taxation.

Privateers were a large part of the total military force at sea during the 17th and 18th centuries. In the first Anglo-Dutch War, English privateers attacked the trade on which the United Provinces entirely depended, capturing over 1,000 Dutch merchant ships. During the subsequent war with Spain, Spanish and Flemish privateers in the service of the Spanish Crown, including the Dunkirkers, captured 1,500 English merchant ships. British trade, whether coastal, Atlantic, or Mediterranean, was also attacked by Dutch privateers and others in the Second and Third Anglo-Dutch wars. Piet Pieterszoon Hein was a brilliantly successful Dutch privateer who captured a Spanish treasure fleet. Magnus Heinason was another privateer who served the Dutch against the Spanish. While their and others' attacks brought home a great deal of money, they hardly dented the flow of gold and silver from Mexico to Spain.

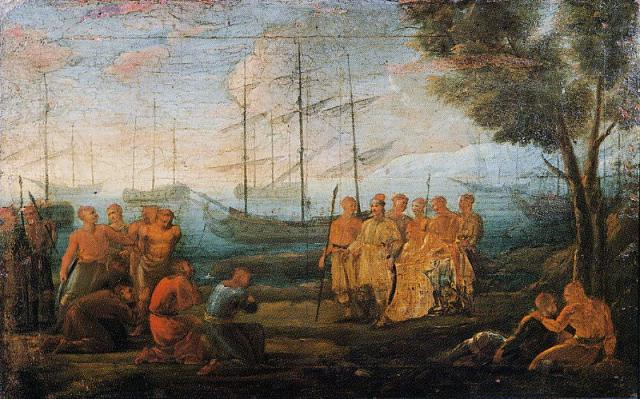
Greek privateer Lambros Katsonis raided Ottoman shipping in the 18th century

As the Industrial Revolution proceeded, privateering became increasingly incompatible with modern states' monopoly on violence. Modern warships could easily outrace merchantmen, and tight controls on naval armaments led to fewer private-purchase naval weapons. Privateering continued until the 1856 Declaration of Paris, in which all major European powers stated that "Privateering is and remains abolished". The United States did not sign the Declaration over stronger language that protects all private property from capture at sea, but has not issued letters of marque in any subsequent conflicts. In the 19th century, many nations passed laws forbidding their nationals from accepting commissions as privateers for other nations. The last major power to flirt with privateering was Prussia in the 1870 Franco-Prussian War, when Prussia announced the creation of a 'volunteer navy' of ships privately owned and -manned, but eligible for prize money. (Prussia argued that the Declaration did not forbid such a force, because the ships were subject to naval discipline.)

=== England/Britain ===
In England, and later the United Kingdom, the ubiquity of wars and the island nation's reliance on maritime trade enabled the use of privateers to great effect. England also suffered much from other nations' privateering. During the 15th century, the country "lacked an institutional structure and coordinated finance". When piracy became an increasing problem, merchant communities such as Bristol began to resort to self-help, arming and equipping ships at their own expense to protect commerce. The licensing of these privately owned merchant ships by the Crown enabled them to legitimately capture vessels that were deemed pirates. This constituted a "revolution in naval strategy" and helped fill the need for protection that the Crown was unable to provide.

During the reign of Queen Elizabeth I (1558–1603), she "encouraged the development of this supplementary navy". Over the course of her rule, the increase of Spanish prosperity through their explorations in the New World and the discovery of gold contributed to the deterioration of Anglo-Spanish relations. Elizabeth's authorisation of sea-raiders (known as Sea Dogs) such as Francis Drake and Walter Raleigh allowed her to officially distance herself from their raiding activities while enjoying the gold gained from these raids. English ships cruised in the Caribbean and off the coast of Spain, trying to intercept treasure fleets from the Spanish Main. During the Anglo-Spanish War (1585–1604) England continued to rely on private ships-of-war to attack Iberian shipping because the Queen had insufficient finance to fund this herself. After the war ended many unemployed English privateers turned to piracy.

Elizabeth was succeeded by the first Stuart monarchs, James I and Charles I, who did not permit privateering. Desperate to fund the expensive War of Spanish Succession, Queen Anne restarted privateering and even removed the need for a sovereign's percentage as an incentive. Sovereigns continued to license British privateers throughout the century, although there were a number of unilateral and bilateral declarations limiting privateering between 1785 and 1823. This helped establish the privateer's persona as heroic patriots. British privateers last appeared en masse in the Napoleonic Wars.

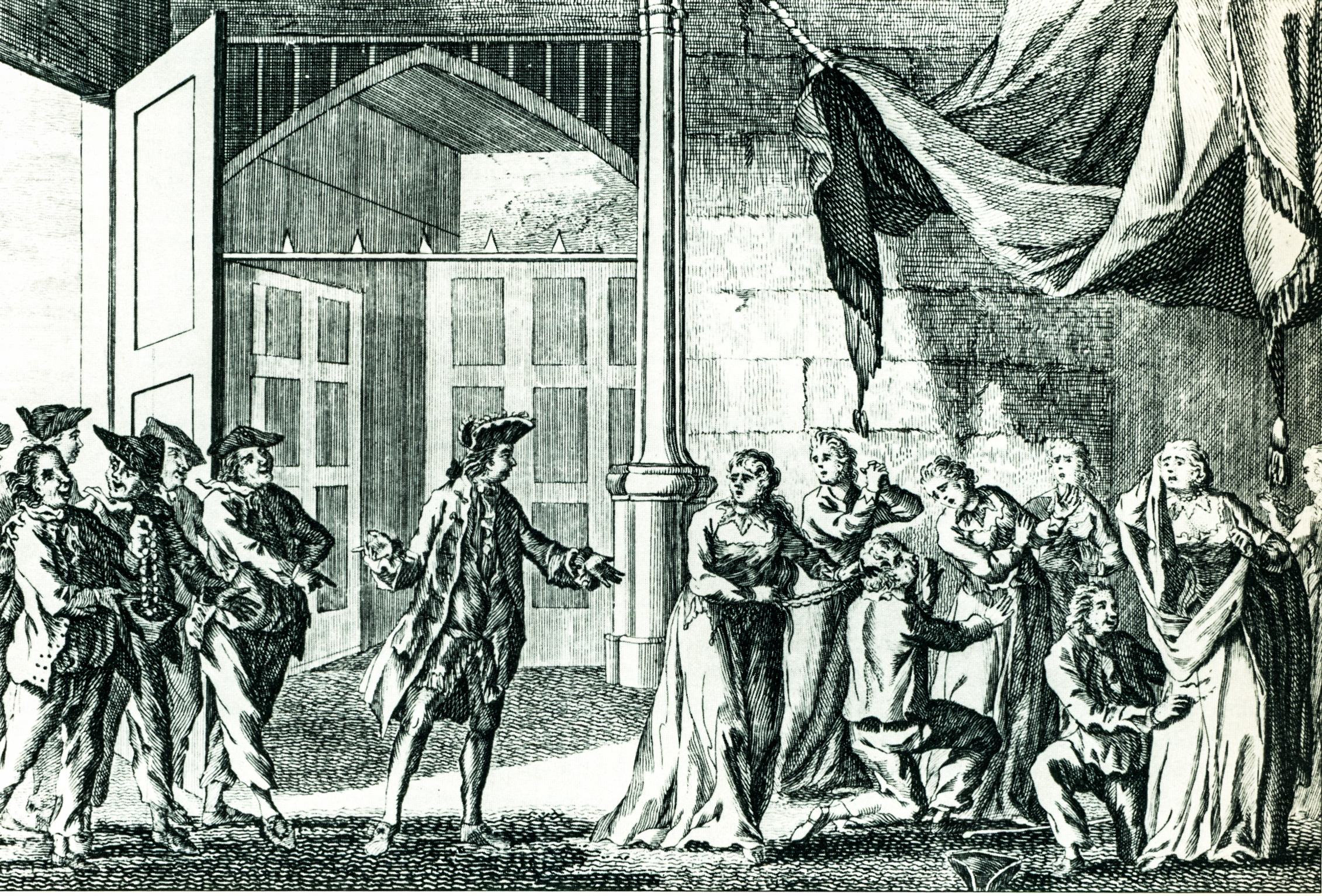
Woodes Rogers and his men searching Spanish ladies for their jewels in Guayaquil in 1709

England and Scotland practiced privateering both separately and together after they united to create the Kingdom of Great Britain in 1707. It was a way to gain for themselves some of the wealth the Spanish and Portuguese were taking from the New World before beginning their own trans-Atlantic settlement, and a way to assert naval power before a strong Royal Navy emerged.

Sir Andrew Barton, Lord High Admiral of Scotland, followed the example of his father, who had been issued with letters of marque by James III of Scotland to prey upon English and Portuguese shipping in 1485; the letters in due course were reissued to the son. Barton was killed following an encounter with the English in 1511.

Sir Francis Drake, who had close contact with the sovereign, was responsible for some damage to Spanish shipping, as well as attacks on Spanish settlements in the Americas in the 16th century. He participated in the successful English defence against the Spanish Armada in 1588, though he was also partly responsible for the failure of the English Armada against Spain in 1589.

Sir George Clifford, 3rd Earl of Cumberland, was a successful privateer against Spanish shipping in the Caribbean. He is also famous for his short-lived 1598 capture of Fort San Felipe del Morro, the citadel protecting San Juan, Puerto Rico. He arrived in Puerto Rico on June 15, 1598, but by November of that year, Clifford and his men had fled the island due to fierce civilian resistance. He gained sufficient prestige from his naval exploits to be named the official Champion of Queen Elizabeth I. Clifford became extremely wealthy through his buccaneering but lost most of his money gambling on horse races.

The British privateer Boscawen engaging several French ships on 23 May 1745

Captain Christopher Newport led more attacks on Spanish shipping and settlements than any other English privateer. As a young man, Newport sailed with Sir Francis Drake in the attack on the Spanish fleet at Cadiz and participated in England's defeat of the Spanish Armada. During the war with Spain, Newport seized fortunes of Spanish and Portuguese treasure in fierce sea battles in the West Indies as a privateer for Queen Elizabeth I. He lost an arm whilst capturing a Spanish ship during an expedition in 1590, but despite this, he continued on privateering, successfully blockading Western Cuba the following year. In 1592, Newport captured the Portuguese carrack Madre de Deus (Mother of God), valued at £500,000.

Sir Henry Morgan was a successful privateer. Operating out of Jamaica, he carried on a war against Spanish interests in the region, often using cunning tactics. His operation was prone to cruelty against those he captured, including torture to gain information about booty, and in one case using priests as human shields. Despite reproaches for some of his excesses, he was generally protected by Sir Thomas Modyford, the governor of Jamaica. He took an enormous amount of booty, as well as landing his privateers ashore and attacking land fortifications, including the sack of the city of Panama with only 1,400 crew.

Other British privateers of note include Fortunatus Wright, Edward Collier, Sir John Hawkins, his son Sir Richard Hawkins, Michael Geare, and Sir Christopher Myngs. Notable British colonial privateers in Nova Scotia include Alexander Godfrey of the brig Rover and Joseph Barss of the schooner Liverpool Packet. The latter schooner captured over 50 American vessels during the War of 1812.

=== Bermudians ===
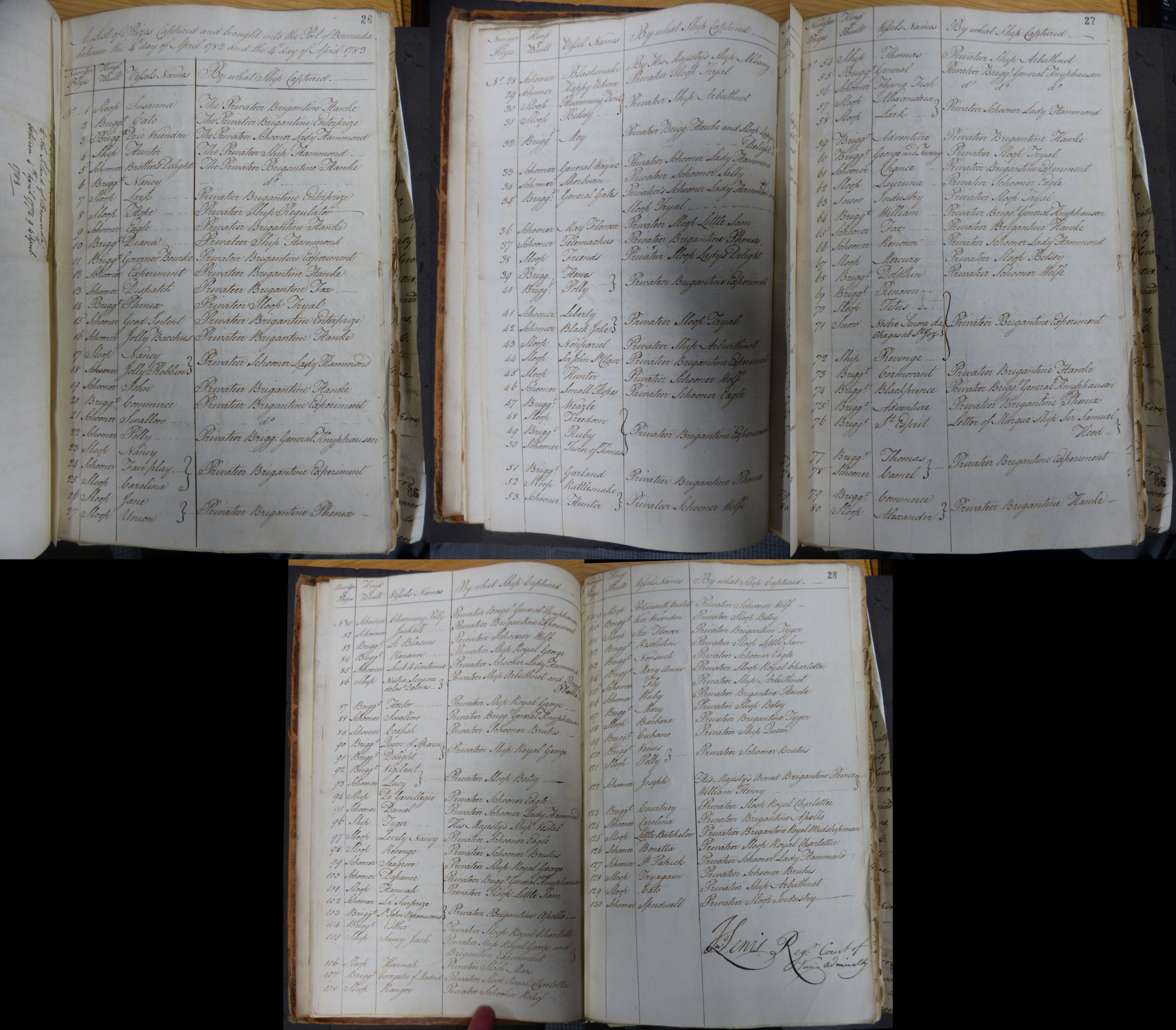
130 prizes captured and brought into Bermuda between 1782-04-04 and 1783-04-04

The English colony of Bermuda (or the Somers Isles), settled accidentally in 1609, was used as a base for English privateers from the time it officially became part of the territory of the Virginia Company in 1612, especially by ships belonging to Robert Rich, the Earl of Warwick, for whom Bermuda's Warwick Parish is named (the Warwick name had long been associated with commerce raiding, as exampled by the Newport Ship, thought to have been taken from the Spanish by Warwick the Kingmaker in the 15th century). Many Bermudians were employed as crew aboard privateers throughout the century, although the colony was primarily devoted to farming cash crops until turning from its failed agricultural economy to the sea after the 1684 dissolution of the Somers Isles Company (a spin-off of the Virginia Company, which had overseen the colony since 1615). With a total area of 54 square kilometres (21 sq mi) and lacking any natural resources other than the Bermuda cedar, the colonists applied themselves fully to the maritime trades, developing the speedy Bermuda sloop, which was well suited both to commerce and to commerce raiding. Bermudian merchant vessels turned to privateering at every opportunity in the 18th century, preying on the shipping of Spain, France, and other nations during a series of wars, including the 1688 to 1697 Nine Years' War (King William's War); the 1702 to 1713 Queen Anne's War; the 1739 to 1748 War of Jenkins' Ear; the 1740 to 1748 War of the Austrian Succession (King George's War); the 1754 to 1763 Seven Years' War (known in the United States as the French and Indian War, this conflict was devastating for the colony's merchant fleet. Fifteen privateers operated from Bermuda during the war, but losses exceeded captures); the 1775 to 1783 American War of Independence; and the 1796 to 1808 Anglo-Spanish War. By the middle of the 18th century, Bermuda was sending twice as many privateers to sea as any of the continental colonies. They typically left Bermuda with very large crews. This advantage in manpower was vital in overpowering the crews of larger vessels, which themselves often lacked sufficient crewmembers to put up a strong defence. The extra crewmen were also useful as prize crews for returning captured vessels.

The Bahamas, which had been depopulated of its indigenous inhabitants by the Spanish, had been settled by England, beginning with the Eleutheran Adventurers, dissident Puritans driven out of Bermuda during the English Civil War. Spanish and French attacks destroyed New Providence in 1703, creating a stronghold for pirates (many having been privateers before refusing to give up their livelihoods in peacetime), and it became a thorn in the side of British merchant trade through the area. In 1718, Britain appointed Woodes Rogers as Governor of the Bahamas, and sent him at the head of a force to reclaim the settlement. Before his arrival, however, the pirates had been forced to surrender by a force of Bermudian privateers who had been issued letters of marque by the Governor of Bermuda.

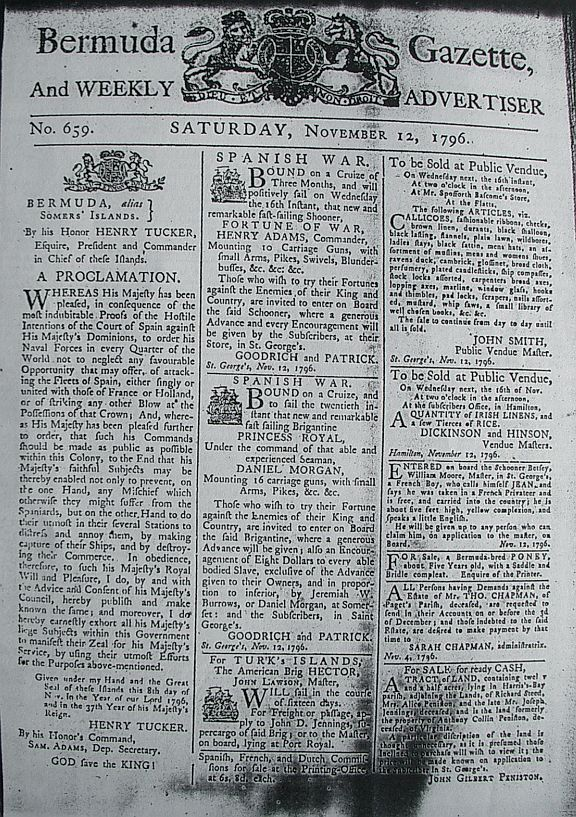
Bermuda Gazette of 12 November 1796, calling for privateering against Spain and its allies during the 1796 to 1808 Anglo-Spanish War, and with advertisements for crew for two privateer vessels.

Bermuda was in de facto control of the Turks Islands, with their lucrative salt industry, from the late 17th century to the early 19th. The Bahamas made perpetual attempts to claim the Turks for itself. On several occasions, this involved seizing the vessels of Bermudian salt traders. A virtual state of war was said to exist between Bermudian and Bahamian vessels for much of the 18th century. When the Bermudian sloop Seaflower was seized by the Bahamians in 1701, the response of the Governor of Bermuda, Captain Benjamin Bennett, was to issue letters of marque to Bermudian vessels. In 1706, Spanish and French forces ousted the Bermudians but were driven out themselves three years later by the Bermudian privateer Captain Lewis Middleton. His ship, the Rose, attacked a Spanish and a French privateer holding a captive English vessel. Defeating the two enemy vessels, the Rose then cleared out the thirty-man garrison left by the Spanish and French.

Despite strong sentiments in support of the rebels, especially in the early stages, Bermudian privateers turned as aggressively on American shipping during the American War of Independence. The importance of privateering to the Bermudian economy had been increased not only by the loss of most of Bermuda's continental trade but also by the Palliser Act, which forbade Bermudian vessels from fishing the Grand Banks. Bermudian trade with the rebellious American colonies actually carried on throughout the war. Some historians credit the large number of Bermuda sloops (reckoned at over a thousand) built-in Bermuda as privateers and sold illegally to the Americans as enabling the rebellious colonies to win their independence. Also, the Americans were dependent on Turks salt, and one hundred barrels of gunpowder were stolen from a Bermudian magazine and supplied to the rebels as orchestrated by Colonel Henry Tucker and Benjamin Franklin, and as requested by George Washington, in exchange for which the Continental Congress authorised the sale of supplies to Bermuda, which was dependent on American produce. The realities of this interdependence did nothing to dampen the enthusiasm with which Bermudian privateers turned on their erstwhile countrymen.

An American naval captain, ordered to take his ship out of Boston Harbor to eliminate a pair of Bermudian privateering vessels that had been picking off vessels missed by the Royal Navy, returned frustrated, saying, "the Bermudians sailed their ships two feet for every one of ours". Around 10,000 Bermudians emigrated in the years prior to American independence, mostly to the American colonies. Many Bermudians occupied prominent positions in American seaports, from where they continued their maritime trades (Bermudian merchants controlled much of the trade through ports like Charleston, South Carolina, and Bermudian shipbuilders influenced the development of American vessels, like the Chesapeake Bay schooner), and in the Revolution they used their knowledge of Bermudians and of Bermuda, as well as their vessels, for the rebels' cause. In the 1777 Battle of Wreck Hill, brothers Charles and Francis Morgan, members of a large Bermudian enclave that had dominated Charleston, South Carolina and its environs since settlement, captaining two sloops (the Fair American and the Experiment, respectively), carried out the only attack on Bermuda during the war. The target was a fort that guarded a little used passage through the encompassing reef line. After the soldiers manning the fort were forced to abandon it, they spiked its guns and fled themselves before reinforcements could arrive.

A Bermuda sloop engaged as a privateer.

When the Americans captured the Bermudian privateer Regulator, they discovered that virtually all of her crew were black slaves. Authorities in Boston offered these men their freedom, but all 70 elected to be treated as prisoners of war. Sent as such to New York on the sloop Duxbury, they seized the vessel and sailed it back to Bermuda. One-hundred and thirty prizes were brought to Bermuda in the year between 4th day of April 1782 and the 4th day of April 1783 alone, including three by Royal Naval vessels and the remainder by privateers.

The War of 1812 saw an encore of Bermudian privateering, which had died out after the 1790s. The decline of Bermudian privateering was due partly to the buildup of the naval base in Bermuda, which reduced the Admiralty's reliance on privateers in the western Atlantic, and partly to successful American legal suits and claims for damages pressed against British privateers, a large portion of which were aimed squarely at the Bermudians. During the course of the War of 1812, Bermudian privateers captured 298 ships, some 19% of the 1,593 vessels captured by British naval and privateering vessels between the Great Lakes and the West Indies.

Among the better known (native-born and immigrant) Bermudian privateers were Hezekiah Frith, Bridger Goodrich, Henry Jennings, Thomas Hewetson, and Thomas Tew.

=== Providence Island colony ===
Bermudians were also involved in privateering from the short-lived English colony on Isla de Providencia, off the coast of Nicaragua. This colony was initially settled largely via Bermuda, with about eighty Bermudians moved to Providence in 1631. Although it was intended that the colony be used to grow cash crops, its location in the heart of the Spanish controlled territory ensured that it quickly became a base for privateering.

Bermuda-based privateer Daniel Elfrith, while on a privateering expedition with Captain Sussex Camock of the bark Somer Ilands (a rendering of "Somers Isles", the alternate name of the Islands of Bermuda commemorating Admiral Sir George Somers) in 1625, discovered two islands off the coast of Nicaragua, 80 kilometres (50 mi) apart from each other. Camock stayed with 30 of his men to explore one of the islands, San Andrés, while Elfrith took the Warwicke back to Bermuda bringing news of Providence Island. Bermuda Governor Bell wrote on behalf of Elfrith to Sir Nathaniel Rich, a businessman and cousin of the Earl of Warwick (the namesake of Warwick Parish), who presented a proposal for colonizing the island noting its strategic location "lying in the heart of the Indies & the mouth of the Spaniards". Elfrith was appointed admiral of the colony's military forces in 1631, remaining the overall military commander for over seven years. During this time, Elfrith served as a guide to other privateers and sea captains arriving in the Caribbean. Elfrith invited the well-known privateer Diego el Mulato to the island. Samuel Axe, one of the military leaders, also accepted letters of marque from the Dutch authorizing privateering.

The Spanish did not hear of the Providence Island colony until 1635 when they captured some Englishmen in Portobelo, on the Isthmus of Panama. Francisco de Murga, Governor and Captain-General of Cartagena, dispatched Captain Gregorio de Castellar y Mantilla and engineer Juan de Somovilla Texada to destroy the colony. The Spanish were repelled and forced to retreat "in haste and disorder". After the attack, King Charles I of England issued letters of marque to the Providence Island Company on 21 December 1635 authorizing raids on the Spanish in retaliation for a raid that had destroyed the English colony on Tortuga earlier in 1635 (Tortuga had come under the protection of the Providence Island Company. In 1635 a Spanish fleet raided Tortuga. 195 colonists were hung and 39 prisoners and 30 slaves were captured). The company could in turn issue letters of marque to subcontracting privateers who used the island as a base, for a fee. This soon became an important source of profit. Thus the company made an agreement with the merchant Maurice Thompson under which Thompson could use the island as a base in return for 20% of the booty.

In March 1636 the Company dispatched Captain Robert Hunt on the Blessing to assume the governorship of what was now viewed as a base for privateering. Depredations continued, leading to growing tension between England and Spain, which were still technically at peace.

On 11 July 1640, the Spanish Ambassador in London complained again, saying he

understands that there is lately brought in at the Isle of Wight by one, Captain James Reskinner [James Reiskimmer], a ship very richly laden with silver, gold, diamonds, pearls, jewels, and many other precious commodities taken by him in virtue of a commission of the said Earl [of Warwick] from the subjects of his Catholic Majesty ... to the infinite wrong and dishonour of his Catholic Majesty, to find himself thus injured and violated, and his subjects thus spoiled, robbed, impoverished and murdered in the highest time of peace, league and amity with your Majesty.

Nathaniel Butler, formerly Governor of Bermuda, was the last full governor of Providence Island, replacing Robert Hunt in 1638. Butler returned to England in 1640, satisfied that the fortifications were adequate, deputizing the governorship to Captain Andrew Carter.

In 1640, don Melchor de Aguilera, Governor and Captain-General of Cartagena, resolved to remove the intolerable infestation of pirates on the island. Taking advantage of having infantry from Castile and Portugal wintering in his port, he dispatched six hundred armed Spaniards from the fleet and the presidio, and two hundred black and mulatto militiamen under the leadership of don Antonio Maldonado y Tejada, his Sergeant Major, in six small frigates and a galleon. The troops were landed on the island, and a fierce fight ensued. The Spanish were forced to withdraw when a gale blew up and threatened their ships. Carter had the Spanish prisoners executed. When the Puritan leaders protested against this brutality, Carter sent four of them home in chains.

The Spanish acted decisively to avenge their defeat. General Francisco Díaz Pimienta was given orders by King Philip IV of Spain, and sailed from Cartagena to Providence with seven large ships, four pinnaces, 1,400 soldiers and 600 seamen, arriving on 19 May 1641. At first, Pimienta planned to attack the poorly defended east side, and the English rushed there to improvise defenses. With the winds against him, Pimienta changed plans and made for the main New Westminster harbor and launched his attack on 24 May. He held back his large ships to avoid damage, and used the pinnaces to attack the forts. The Spanish troops quickly gained control, and once the forts saw the Spanish flag flying over the governor's house, they began negotiations for surrender.

On 25 May 1641, Pimienta formally took possession and celebrated mass in the church. The Spanish took sixty guns, and captured the 350 settlers who remained on the island – others had escaped to the Mosquito Coast. They took the prisoners to Cartagena. The women and children were given a passage back to England. The Spanish found gold, indigo, cochineal and six hundred black slaves on the island, worth a total of 500,000 ducats, some of the accumulated booty from the raids on Spanish ships. Rather than destroy the defenses, as instructed, Pimienta left a small garrison of 150 men to hold the island and prevent occupation by the Dutch. Later that year, Captain John Humphrey, who had been chosen to succeed Captain Butler as governor, arrived with a large group of dissatisfied settlers from New England. He found the Spanish occupying the islands, and sailed away. Pimienta's decision to occupy the island was approved in 1643 and he was made a knight of the Order of Santiago.

=== Spain and its colonies ===
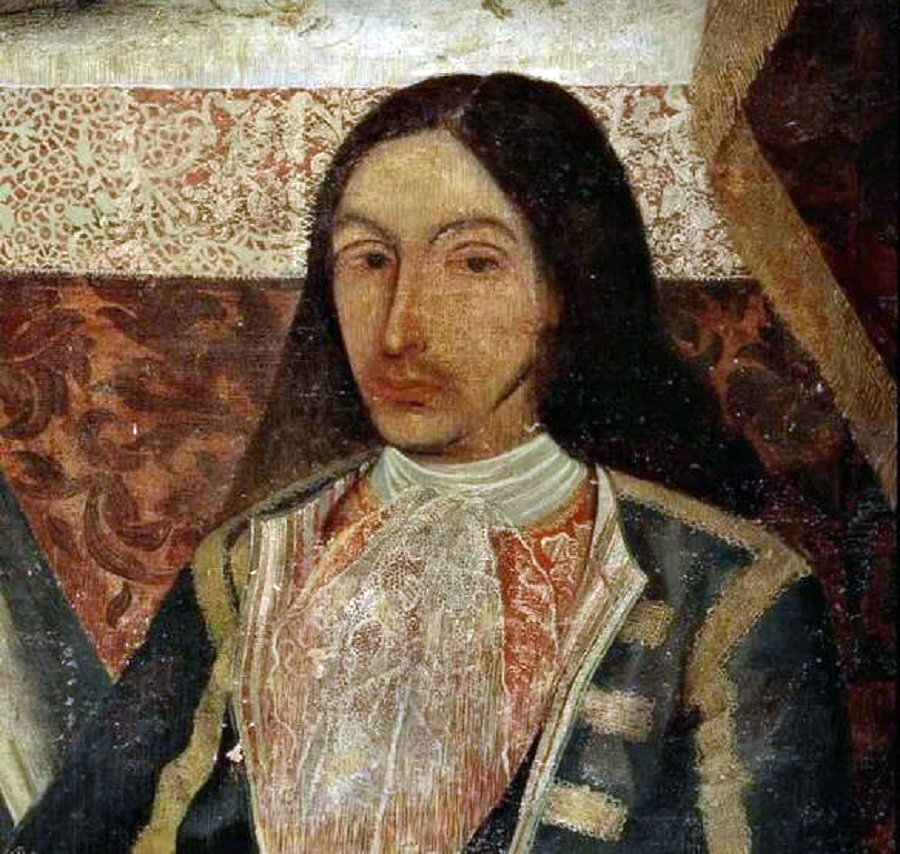
The Spanish Amaro Pargo was one of the most famous corsairs of the Golden Age of Piracy.

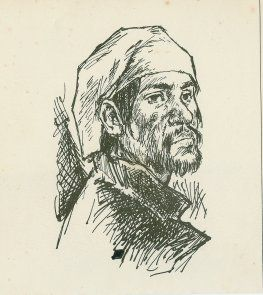
Miguel Enríquez.

When Spain issued a decree blocking foreign countries from trading, selling or buying merchandise in its Caribbean colonies, the entire region became engulfed in a power struggle among the naval superpowers. The newly independent United States later became involved in this scenario, complicating the conflict. As a consequence, Spain increased the issuing of privateering contracts. These contracts allowed an income option to the inhabitants of these colonies that were not related to the Spanish conquistadores. The most well-known privateer corsairs of the eighteenth century in the Spanish colonies were Miguel Enríquez of Puerto Rico and José Campuzano-Polanco of Santo Domingo. Miguel Enríquez was a Puerto Rican mulatto who abandoned his work as a shoemaker to work as a privateer. Such was the success of Enríquez, that he became one of the wealthiest men in the New World. His fleet was composed of approx. 300 different ships during a career that spanned 35 years, becoming a military asset and reportedly outperforming the efficiency of the Armada de Barlovento. Enríquez was knighted and received the title of Don from Philip V, something unheard of due to his ethnic and social background. One of the most famous privateers from Spain was Amaro Pargo.

=== France ===
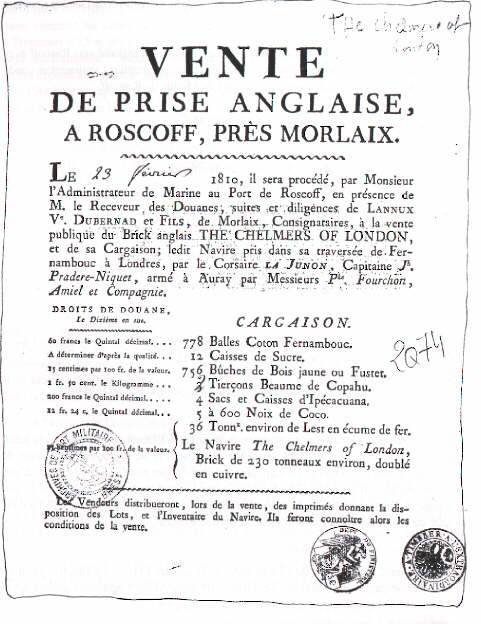
Advertising for the auction of the prize Chelmers of London, brig captured by the French privateer Junon in 1810.

Corsairs (French: corsaire) were privateers, authorized to conduct raids on shipping of a nation at war with France, on behalf of the French Crown. Seized vessels and cargo were sold at auction, with the corsair captain entitled to a portion of the proceeds. Although not French Navy personnel, corsairs were considered legitimate combatants in France (and allied nations), provided the commanding officer of the vessel was in possession of a valid Letter of Marque (fr. Lettre de Marque or Lettre de Course), and the officers and crew conducted themselves according to contemporary admiralty law. By acting on behalf of the French Crown, if captured by the enemy, they could claim treatment as prisoners of war, instead of being considered pirates. Because corsairs gained a swashbuckling reputation, the word "corsair" is also used generically as a more romantic or flamboyant way of referring to privateers, or even to pirates. The Barbary pirates of North Africa as well as Ottomans were sometimes called "Turkish corsairs".

=== Malta ===
Corsairing (Italian: corso) was an important aspect of Malta's economy when the island was ruled by the Order of St. John, although the practice had begun earlier. Corsairs sailed on privately owned ships on behalf of the Grand Master of the Order, and were authorized to attack Muslim ships, usually merchant ships from the Ottoman Empire. The corsairs included knights of the Order, native Maltese people, as well as foreigners. When they captured a ship, the goods were sold and the crew and passengers were ransomed or enslaved, and the Order took a percentage of the value of the booty. Corsairing remained common until the end of the 18th century.

=== United States ===
==== British Colonial period ====
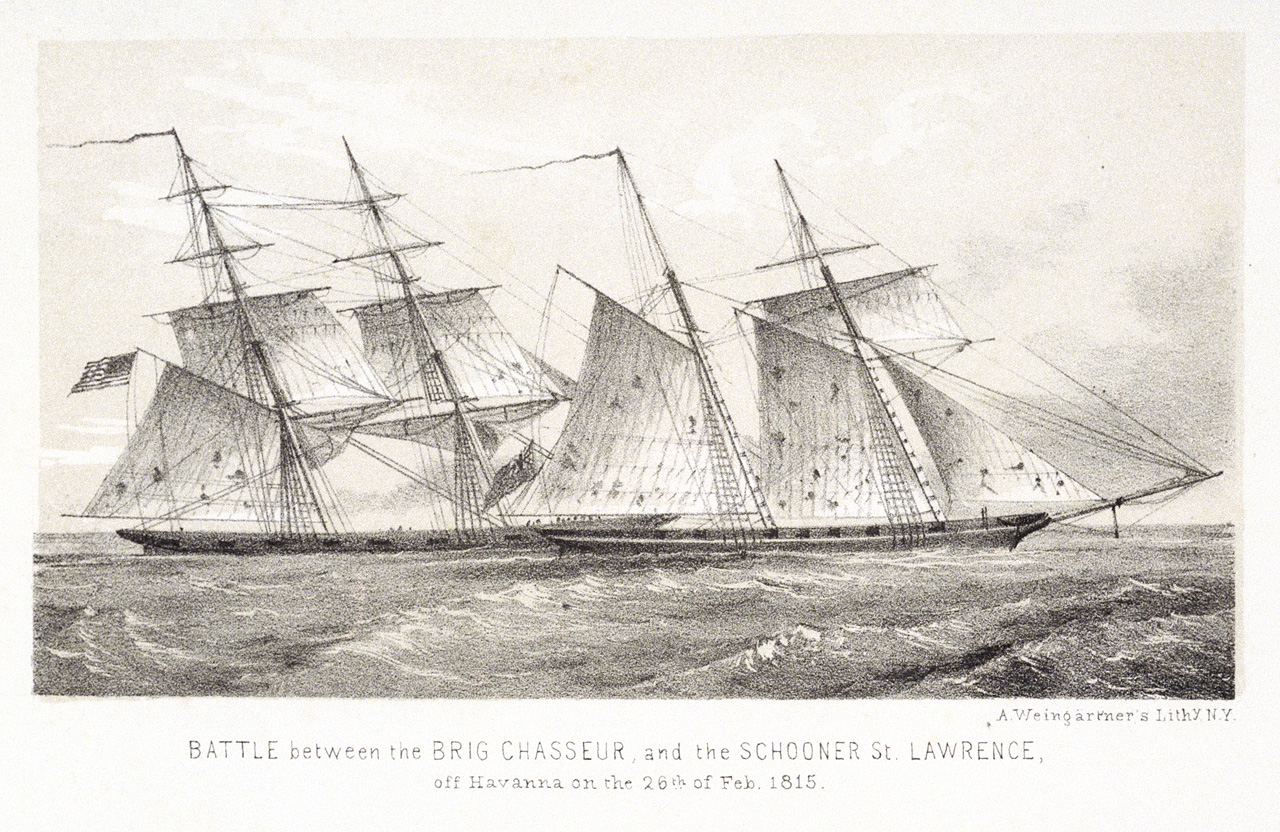
Chasseur, one of the most famous American privateers of the War of 1812, capturing HMS St Lawrence

During King George's War, approximately 36,000 Americans served aboard privateers at one time or another. During the Nine Years War, the French adopted a policy of strongly encouraging privateers, including the famous Jean Bart, to attack English and Dutch shipping. England lost roughly 4,000 merchant ships during the war. In the following War of Spanish Succession, privateer attacks continued, Britain losing 3,250 merchant ships.

In the subsequent conflict, the War of Austrian Succession, the Royal Navy was able to concentrate more on defending British ships. Britain lost 3,238 merchantmen, a smaller fraction of her merchant marine than the enemy losses of 3,434. While French losses were proportionally severe, the smaller but better protected Spanish trade suffered the least and it was Spanish privateers who enjoyed much of the best-allied plunder of British trade, particularly in the West Indies.

==== American Revolutionary War ====
Privateering saw a rise within the American Revolutionary War and played a crucial role. What distinguishes privateers from piracy is the act of being commissioned. Unlike privateers, pirates act outside any government authority, seizing ships and violating international law. By contrast, Privateers operate under a legally binding framework. Congress issues privateering licenses, which authorizes "legal piracy", to merchant captains in an effort to target British merchant shipping and to a lesser extent warships, supply ships and privateers. These commissions gave permission "to attack, seize and take the ships and other vessels belonging to the inhabitants of Great Britain, or any of them, with their tackle, apparel, furniture, and ladings, on the high seas".

Congress adopted privateering in 1776, but opinions were indecisive. While recruitment for privateers proved highly successful, even to the frustration of Continental Navy officers. On Friday, March 1st, 1776, the petition from the citizens of Philadelphia for the right of privateers reached Continental Congress. However, the delegates took no immediate action. This was because certain members of Congress were still in favor of trying to keep order and maintain a relationship with Britain. This led Congress to continue to debate and postpone privateering, which eventually led the colonists to continue to outfit their own privateers to protect their ports, homes and products. This brought immediate success as Major Joseph Ward shared good news with John Adams in a letter dated March 14, 1776. Notifying Adams about how "our privateers continue successful". After countless debates and disagreements, Oliver Wolcott was one of the main advocates for privateering stating, "the Colonies are entirely cast out of the King's protection" and the colonies need to protect themselves. On the other hand, John Jay mentions the concern of how privateers would determine "friend from foe" and Benjemin Franklin concern on how their "first step should be a declaration of war", as privateering without a formal war declaration was legally and politically dangerous. Finally, the declaration on privateering was finalized on Saturday, March 23, 1776.

During the Revolutionary War, American privateers were privately financed. With the slave trade being temporarily closed, many prominent families took a risk with financing privateering in trying to keep their business running, with the Brown family of Providence being one of the biggest ones. These financers would provide crews, ships and supplies in which these privateers would then capture ships, quickly sell their prizes, and divide their profits with the financier (persons or company) and the state (colony). Long Island Sound became a hornets' nest of privateering activity during the American Revolution (1775–1783), as most transports to and from New York went through the Sound. New London, Connecticut was a chief privateering port for the American colonies, leading to the Royal Navy to blockade between 1778 and 1779. Chief financiers of privateering included Thomas & Nathaniel Shaw of New London and John McCurdy of Lyme.

Privateers were heavily armed, and conflict occurred often with the battles ending in either death or surrender. A tactic that privateer vessels used was to wear false colors and flags to deceive enemy vessels prior to engagement. Allowing them to have an upper hand. American privateer did not only engage at sea but also on the beach, as privateers ranged along the shorelines of the Atlantic. Privateers fought land engagements, however small, on foreign soil. America weren't alone either as Adams wrote to James Warren on March 31, 1777, "We have this day received Letters from Europe, of an interesting Nature... that all the Ports of France, Spain, and Italy, and all the Ports in the Mediterranean, excepting Portugal, are open to our Privateers and Merchant Ships." Stating the collective effort of other nations to aid American privateers.

Many Americans signed up to be a privateer, with about 55,000 American seamen serving aboard the privateers. However, motivation varies from person to person. Some, such as one privateer from Connecticut, sought opportunity and money in privateering. In a letter from Martinique, the privateer states how "I do not propose coming home until I get some cash". Some like this privateer chose privateering as a way of earning income. This was especially the case when Britain created a naval blockade, and exports dropped by 80%, meaning there weren't any other shipboard jobs other than privateering. Whereas others were motivated by a desire for revenge against Britain's long-standing practice of impressment, which robbed them of personal freedom and prevented them from pursuing work on other ships. One of the most prominent privateers was Gustavus Conyngham, who achieved countless successes all throughout Europe and the Atlantic. Conyngham was backed by Jefferson and commanded several cruises in the waters of Britain, France, Spain, and the Caribbean. He even has been called "the most successful of all Continental Navy captains".

Privateers earned a lot throughout their travels during the Revolutionary War. Early years of the conflict, when success in any form was of utmost importance for the ongoing war effort news of dashing privateers filled out colonel letters, especially about Gustavus Conyngham and his successes. One major success story was on the 20th of December 1778, in which Gustavus Conyngham carried in two prizes to Carogne, one of which sold for 6,000 and the other for 4,500. These prizes brought up morale, generated revenue within port towns and damaged Britain's economy. It is estimated that privateering earned Rhode Island "£300,000 sterling in the year 1776 alone". Furthermore, In the months before the British raids on New London and Groton, a New London privateer took Hannah in what is regarded as the largest prize taken by any American privateer during the war. Retribution was likely part of Gov. Clinton's (NY) motivation for Arnold's Raid, as the Hannah had carried many of his most cherished possessions.

While prizes were lucrative, many privateers also faced the consequences. Many of these privateers were classed as pirates. For example, Conyngham was classed as the "Dunkirk Pirate" even though these privateers were legal combatants and not pirates. Privateers held out little hope of a prisoner's exchange because Great Britain labeled them as pirates, a foe unworthy and undeserving of such consideration. Countless privateers faced terrible prison conditions since they were considered rebels, pirates and especially were considered unworthy for prisoner exchange. Christopher Vail reported that he and 109 crewmen from the privateer Deane were imprisoned aboard the British prison ship Jersey in extremely harsh conditions. Over 1,100 prisoners were confined below decks in filth, extreme temperatures, and severely restricted movement. Disease, especially dysentery, spread rapidly, and the lack of sanitation forced many to relieve themselves where they stood. Deaths were frequent, and bodies were left on the forecastle until the following morning.

Even on their own ships, men who boarded and served aboard privateers also looked unfavorably towards privateering. The Reverend Henry Alline spent one day on a privateer and at the end of his experience warned, "Let them that wish well to their souls flee from privateers as they would from the jaws of hell, for methinks a privateer may be called a floating hell". The reason for this is that the conditions on a privateer ship were horrendous. They were overcrowded, unsanitary, chaotic, and unpredictable when it comes to danger from both the ocean and other ships.

We can see the effect on war that these privateers had from Alderman Wooldridge, who testified in parliament that American privateers had captured or destroyed 733 British ships since the war began, and even after accounting for those recovered, 559 vessels were still lost. He estimated that the total financial damage including ships and cargo at about £1.8 million (£282,005,711.84 in 2025). Privateers devastated British trade, forcing merchants to reroute cargo through neutral ships and raising insurance rates to unsustainable levels, as he added that insurance rates for voyages to America, Africa, and the West Indies had more than doubled, rising to 15 percent without convoy protection. Prices for goods like sugar, tobacco, pitch, and tar had also climbed due to privateer activity. William Creighton similarly claimed that merchant losses from American privateer captures had reached at least £2 million (£313,339,679.82 in 2025) by the previous October.

The shady reputations privateers had gained as the colonies' most effective form of waterborne warfare came with a price as in the eyes of Great Britain, "privateers were the worst of the rebels". This was because they were everywhere, constantly thwarting British plans, whether that is in Africa, Europe or on the coast of America, privateers were always there combating against the British. Due to this disruption, privateers forced British trade to be on foreign ship and not their own. Alongside this, British newspapers constantly kept up with privateer actions towards British ships and the British public very much disliked American privateers. For example, one article states their actions as "deceit not befitting private gentlemen" or how another article states they are determined to treat the privateers as pirates. Britain's obsession towards money and the constant rebuttal that the privateers offered, caused the British to lose millions in trade made these privateers the worst of the rebels in their mind.

Privateering was viewed as undiplomatic and disorderly in an era where the US sought foreign legitimacy with foreign trade and relations. Privateers were deemed unfit to stand alongside celebrated leaders like Washington, John Paul Jones, Jefferson, and Adams, as well as the Continental Army and Navy. As the British viewed privateers as pirates, American leaders avoided celebrating privateers in their national story because they needed British trade but also fearing it would damage the nation's reputation and their own. As the new republic crafted a polished narrative of independence, privateers were intentionally excluded from the dominant national narrative, completely forgotten throughout history.

Overall, privateering conflicted with the moral identity of the new United States. The opportunistic, profit-driven nature of privateering did not fit the image that the US founders wanted as the Founders wanted to shape an image of a noble, law-abiding, and internationally respected nation. For example, Gustavus Conyngham postwar petitions to Congress for compensation and recognition were repeatedly delayed or ignored, despite Conyngham proven contributions and his earlier reputation being a patriot hero. The privateer piece of the puzzle simply did not fit the commemorative picture the Founders had in mind and was completely erased from the foundation that they helped create towards independence.

==== War of 1812 ====
During the War of 1812, both the British and the American governments used privateers, and the established system was very similar. U.S. Congress declared

that war be and the same is hereby declared to exist between the United Kingdom of Great Britain and Ireland and the dependencies thereof, and the United States of America and their Territories; and that the President of the United States is herby authorized to use the whole land and naval force of the United States to carry the same into effect, and to issue to private armed vessels of the United States commissions of marque and general reprisal, in such forms as he shall think proper, and under the seal of the United States, against the vessels, goods, and effects of the Government of the said United Kingdom of Great Britain and Ireland, and the subjects thereof.

President Madison issued 500 letters of marque authorizing privateers. Overall some 200 of the ships took prizes. The cost of buying and fitting of a large privateer was about $40,000 and prizes could net $100,000. Captain Thomas Boyle was one of the famous and successful American privateers. He commanded the Baltimore schooner Comet and then later in the war the Baltimore clipper Chasseur. He captured over 50 British merchant ships during the war. One source estimated a total damage to the British merchant navy from Chasseur's 1813-1815 activities at one and a half million dollars. In total, the Baltimore privateer fleet of 122 ships sunk or seized 500 British ships with an estimated value of $16 million, which accounts about one-third of all the value of all prizes taken over the course of the whole war.

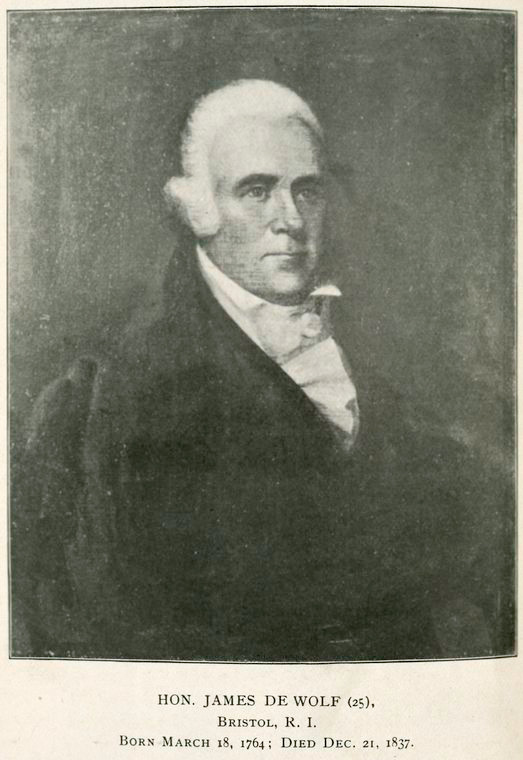
James De Wolf

On April 8, 1814, the British attacked Essex, Connecticut, and burned the ships in the harbor, due to the construction there of a number of privateers. This was the greatest financial loss of the entire War of 1812 suffered by the Americans. However, the private fleet of James De Wolf, which sailed under the flag of the American government in 1812, was most likely a key factor in the naval campaign of the war. De Wolf's ship, the Yankee, was possibly the most financially successful ship of the war. Privateers proved to be far more successful than their US Navy counterparts, claiming three-quarters of the 1600 British merchant ships taken during the war (although a third of these were recaptured prior to making landfall). One of the more successful of these ships was the Prince de Neufchatel, which once captured nine British prizes in swift succession in the English Channel.

Jean Lafitte and his privateers aided US General Andrew Jackson in the defeat of the British in the Battle of New Orleans to receive full pardons for their previous crimes. Jackson formally requested clemency for Lafitte and the men who had served under him, and the US government granted them all a full pardon on February 6, 1815.

However, many of the ships captured by the Americans were recaptured by the Royal Navy. British convoy systems honed during the Napoleonic Wars limited losses to singleton ships, and the effective blockade of American and continental ports prevented captured ships being taken in for sale. This ultimately led to orders forbidding US privateers from attempting to bring their prizes in to port, with captured ships instead having to be burnt. Over 200 American privateers, roughly half of those which went out to sea during the war, were captured by the British and many were turned on their former owners and used by British blockaders. Meanwhile, for every 14 American merchantmen active before the war began, only one dared to leave port during the war despite the Americans' effort to double their maritime trade. Of those that left port, 1,400 were captured by the British, who had virtually extinguished American maritime trade by 1815.

==== 1856 Declaration of Paris ====
The US was not one of the initial signatories of the 1856 Declaration of Paris which outlawed privateering, and the Confederate Constitution authorized use of privateers. However, the US did offer to adopt the terms of the Declaration during the American Civil War, when the Confederates sent several privateers to sea before putting their main effort in the more effective commissioned raiders.

==== American Civil War ====
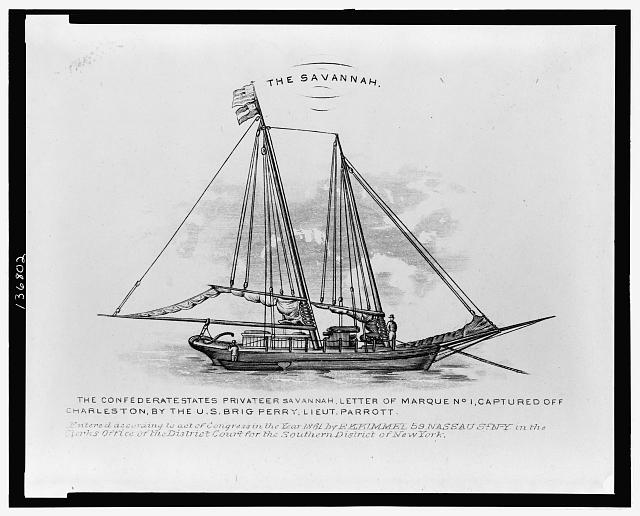
CSS Savannah, a Confederate privateer.

During the American Civil War, privateering took on several forms including blockade running, while privateering generally occurred in the interests of both the North and the South. Letters of marque would often be issued to private shipping companies and other private owners of ships, authorizing them to engage vessels deemed to be unfriendly to the issuing government. Crews of ships were awarded the cargo and other prizes aboard any captured vessel as an incentive to search far and wide for ships attempting to supply the Confederacy, or aid the Union, as the case may be.

During the Civil War Confederate President Jefferson Davis issued letters of marque to anyone who would employ their ship to either attack Union shipping or bring badly needed supplies through the Union blockade into southern ports.

Most of the supplies brought into the Confederacy were carried aboard privately owned vessels. When word came about that the Confederacy was willing to pay almost any price for military supplies, various interested parties designed and built specially designed lightweight seagoing steamers, blockade runners specifically designed and built to outrun Union ships on blockade patrol.

Neither the United States nor Spain authorized privateers in their war in 1898.

=== Latin America ===
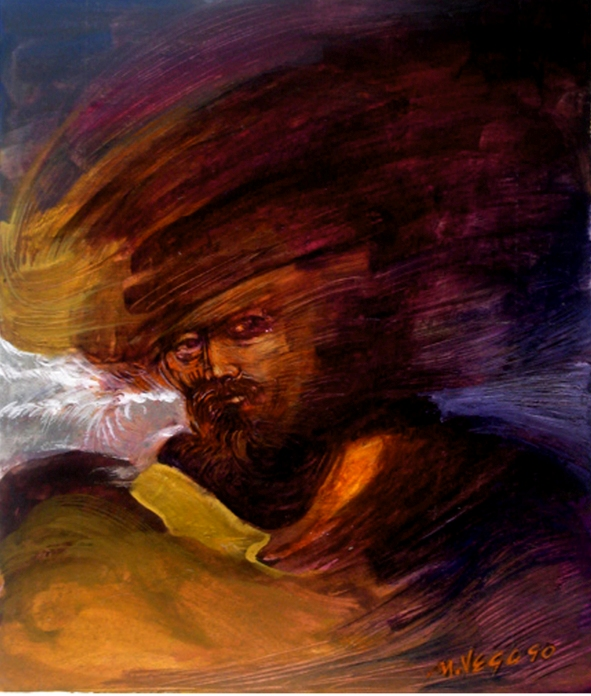
"Corsario" (Privateer) by Mexican artist Mauricio García Vega.

Warships were recruited by the insurgent governments during Spanish American wars of independence to destroy Spanish trade, and capture Spanish Merchant vessels. The private armed vessels came largely from the United States. Seamen from Britain, the United States, and France often manned these ships.

== See also ==
- Armed merchantman
- Louis-Michel Aury
- Auxiliary cruiser
- "Barrett's Privateers"
- Samuel Bellamy
- Buccaneer
- Renato Beluche
- Paul Beneke
- Commerce raiding
- Filibuster (military)
- Foreign Enlistment Act 1870 (UK)
- Violent non-state actors at sea
- Mercenary
- Merchant raider
- Neutrality Act of 1794 (US)
- Pindari
- Private maritime security companies
- Private military company
- Reprisal
- State-sponsored terrorism
- William Walker (filibuster)
- Dominique You
- List of obsolete occupations

== Bibliography ==
- "Conquista de la Isla de Santa Catalina". Varias relaciones del Perú y Chile: y conquista de la isla de Santa Catalina, 1535 á 1658. Impr. de M. Ginesta. 1879. p. 331.
- Cochran, Hamilton (2005). Blockade Runners of the Confederacy. University of Alabama Press.
- Dyer, Brainerd (1934). "Confederate Naval and Privateering Activities in the Pacific". Pacific Historical Review. 3 (4): 433–443. doi:10.2307/3633146. JSTOR 3633146.
- Hamshere, Cyril (1972). "Providence". The British in the Caribbean. Harvard University Press. p. 46.
- Ingersoll, Charles Jared (1852). History of the second war between the United States of America and Great Britain: declared by act of Congress, the 18th of June, 1812, and concluded by peace, the 15th of February, 1815. Lippincott, Grambo & Co.
- Kupperman, Karen Ordahl (1993). "A Puritan Colony in the Tropics: Providence Island, 1630–1641". Settlements in the Americas: Cross-Cultural Perspectives. University of Delaware Press. ISBN 978-0-87413-411-7.
- Latimer, Jon (2009). Buccaneers of the Caribbean: How Piracy Forged an Empire. Harvard University Press. p. 84. ISBN 978-0-674-03403-7.
- Offen, Karl (March 2011). "La cartografía colonial de Centroamérica y el topónimo 'mosquito'". Asociación para el Fomento de los Estudios Históricos en Centroamérica. Archived from the original on 2018-06-19.
- Ramsay, Jack C. (1996). Jean Laffite: Prince of Pirates. Eakin Press. ISBN 978-1-57168-029-7.
- Wagner, Scott D. (2018). "Why there was no privateering in the Spanish-American War". International Journal of Naval History. 14 (1).
