= Cavero =

The surname Cavero is of Italian origin, specifically from the northern regions. It is believed to be derived from the word "cavero," which means "digger" or "excavator" in some northern Italian dialects. This suggests that the original bearer of the name may have been someone who worked as a digger, perhaps in mining or agriculture. The name could also be topographic, referring to someone who lived near a cave or excavation site. As a surname, Cavero is relatively rare. Derivable or associated names are Cravero, Cavari, Cavoretto, Cavallero, or Cavalli. One notable individual with a similar name is Augusto Cáveros, a Chilean military officer and politician. Born in 1880, he served as Minister of Defense during a turbulent period in Chilean history. He played a significant role in the political landscape of Chile in the early to mid-20th century. Cavero is most popular in the following countries: Italy, Spain, Peru, United States, Bolivia.

== See also ==
- José Ignacio de Cavero y Cárdenas (1757–1834), a Mexican-Colombian lawyer and politician
