= José María García de Toledo =

José María García de Toledo y de Madariaga
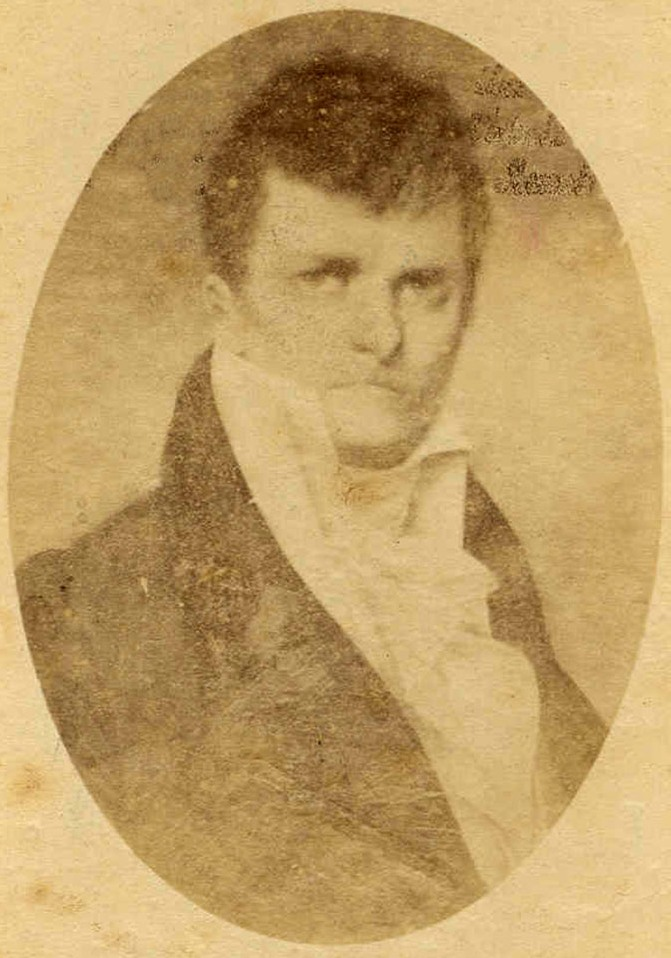

3rd President of the Supreme Junta of Cartagena de Indias
- In office 1 May 1811 – 31 August 1811
- Preceded by: José María del Real e Hidalgo
- Succeeded by: José Ignacio de Cavero y Cárdenas

1st President of the Supreme Junta of Cartagena de Indias
- In office 14 August 1810 – 1 January 1811
- Preceded by: Office created
- Succeeded by: José María del Real e Hidalgo

Personal details
- Born: 11 February 1769 Cartagena, Viceroyalty of the New Granada
- Died: 24 February 1816 (aged 47) Cartagena, Viceroyalty of the New Granada
- Spouse: Juana Díaz de Herrera Gálvez (1793-1805)
- Education: Our Lady of the Rosary University
- Profession: Lawyer

José María García de Toledo y de Madariaga (11 February 1769 — 24 February 1816) was a Neogranadine lawyer and politician, who fought against the Royalist forces during the Patria Boba period that preceded the Colombian War of Independence.

Soon after the banishment of the Spanish governor on 14 June 1810 a Supreme Junta was established in Cartagena de Indias as a direct response to Napoleon's invasion of Spain. García was named as its president, and on 11 November 1811, the Junta declared the independence of Cartagena from Spain.

He was later shot, as one of the "Nine Martyrs", by Pablo Morillo on 24 February 1816, when the city was being "pacified" after the Siege of Cartagena (1815).
