= Cravero =

Cravero is an Italian surname. Notable people with the surname include:

- Jorgelina Cravero (born 1982), Argentine tennis player
- Philippe Cravero (born 1970), Swiss footballer
- Roberto Cravero (born 1964), Italian footballer
- Sergio Cravero, Italian engineer and businessman
