= Melchor de Aguilera =

Governor of Cartagena
- In office 1638–1641
- Preceded by: Vicente de los Reyes Villalobos (acting)
- Succeeded by: Ortuno de Aldape (acting)

Personal details
- Occupation: Soldier

Melchor de Aguilera was the Spanish governor of Cartagena, in what is now Colombia, between 1638 and 1641.

Aguilera met and married Maria de Roche, daughter of an Irish exile, in Madrid. He was assigned to diplomatic and administrative positions in Italy and France before becoming governor of Cartagena de Indias. Their daughter Teresa married Bernardo López de Mendizábal, who became governor of New Mexico.

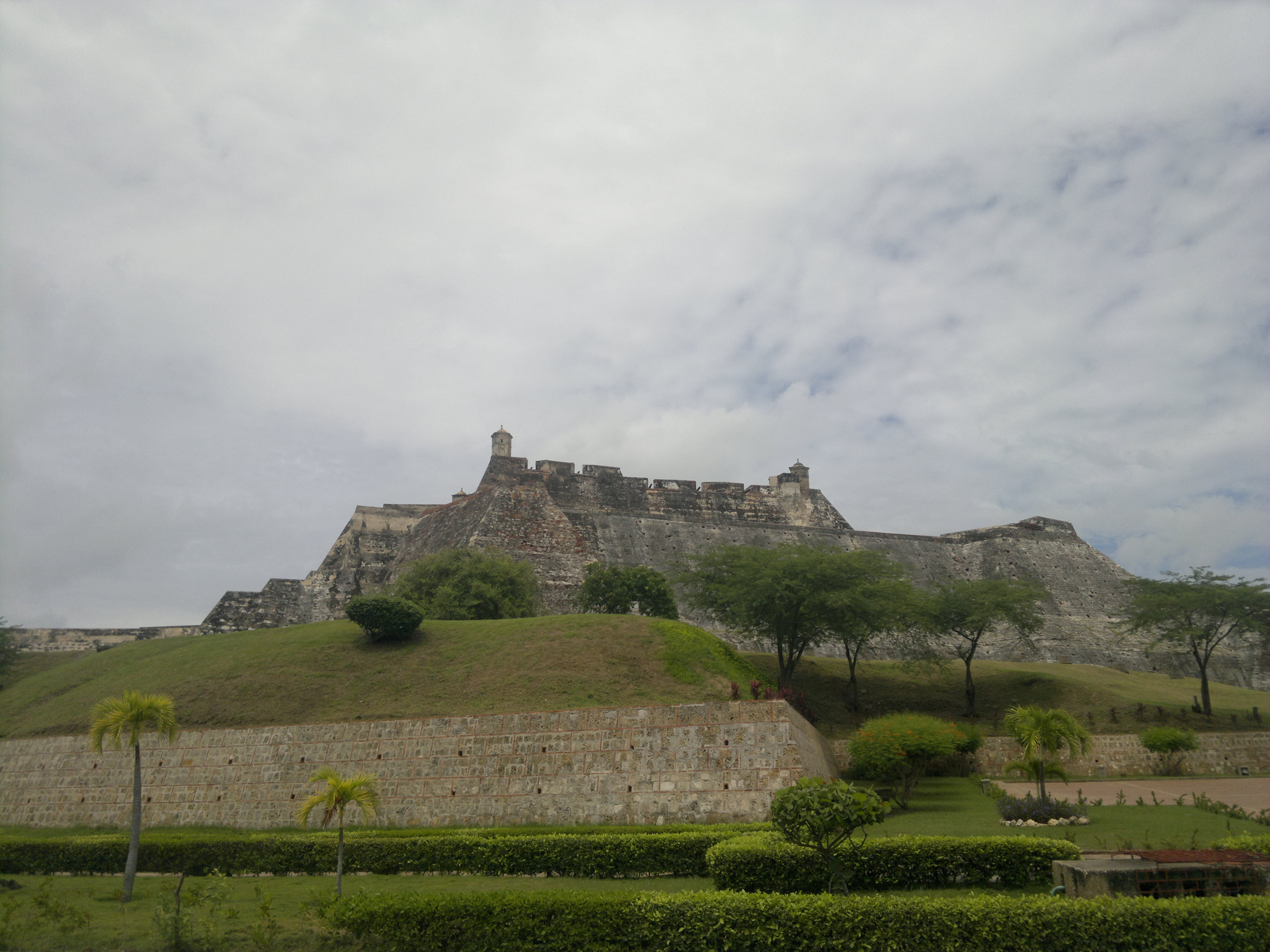
Castillo de San Felipe de Barajas in Cartagena

In a report written on 24 August 1639, Aguilera estimated that when a slave trader arrived in Cartagena they had to pay bribes to more than thirty officials and guards, totalling about 14,000 pesos. A governor of Cartagena could make at least 30,000 pesos yearly by accepting bribes to permit the illegal import of slaves.

In 1639, Aguilera initiated the construction of the Castillo San Felipe de Barajas, an outstanding work of Spanish military engineering, which was undertaken by Juan Mejía del Valle. Due to bureaucratic delays, the castle was only completed during the governorship of Pedro Zapata de Mendoza, who named the castle in honor of King Philip IV of Spain.

In 1640, Aguilera resolved to remove the intolerable infestation of pirates in the Providence Island colony on Santa Catalina Island, now called Providencia Island. Taking advantage of having infantry from Castile and Portugal wintering in his port, he dispatched six hundred armed Spaniards from the fleet and the presidio, and two hundred black and mulatto militiamen under the leadership of don Antonio Maldonado y Tejada, his Sergeant Major, in six small frigates and a galleon. The troops were landed on the island, and a fierce fight ensued. The Spanish were forced to withdraw when a gale blew up and threatened their ships.

== Sources ==
- "Castillo de San Felipe de Barajas". Instituto Cervantes.
- "Conquista de la Isla de Santa Catalina". Varias relaciones del Perú y Chile: y conquista de la isla de Santa Catalina, 1535 á 1658. Impr. de M. Ginesta. 1879. p. 331.
- Hamshere, Cyril (1972). "Providence". The British in the Caribbean. Harvard University Press. p. 46.
- Hordes, Stanley M. (2005). To The End Of The Earth: A History Of The Crypto-jews Of New Mexico. Columbia University Press. p. 149. ISBN 978-0-231-12936-7.
- Newson, Linda A.; Minchin, Susie (2007). From Capture to Sale: The Portuguese Slave Trade to Spanish South America in the Early Seventeenth Century. BRILL. p. 145. ISBN 978-90-04-15679-1.
