= Francisco de Murga =

Spanish general and governor

Francisco de Murga y Ortiz de Orué

Governor of Cartagena
- In office 17 October 1629 – 17 July 1636
- Preceded by: Francisco Guzmán Luis Berrio (Acting)
- Succeeded by: Antonio Maldonado de Tejeda (Acting)

Personal details
- Born: Artomaña
- Died: 17 July 1636 Cartagena
- Occupation: Soldier

Francisco de Murga y Ortiz de Orué (1570? – 1636) was a Spanish soldier and engineer who became Governor and Captain-General of Cartagena. He was governor of Marmora in Africa when he was appointed to fortify the plaza of Cartagena. He was a knight of Order of Santiago. He died in 1636.

== Governor of Cartagena ==
Murga was governor of Cartagena from 1629 until his death in 1636, replacing García Girón de Loayza.

=== Defense ===
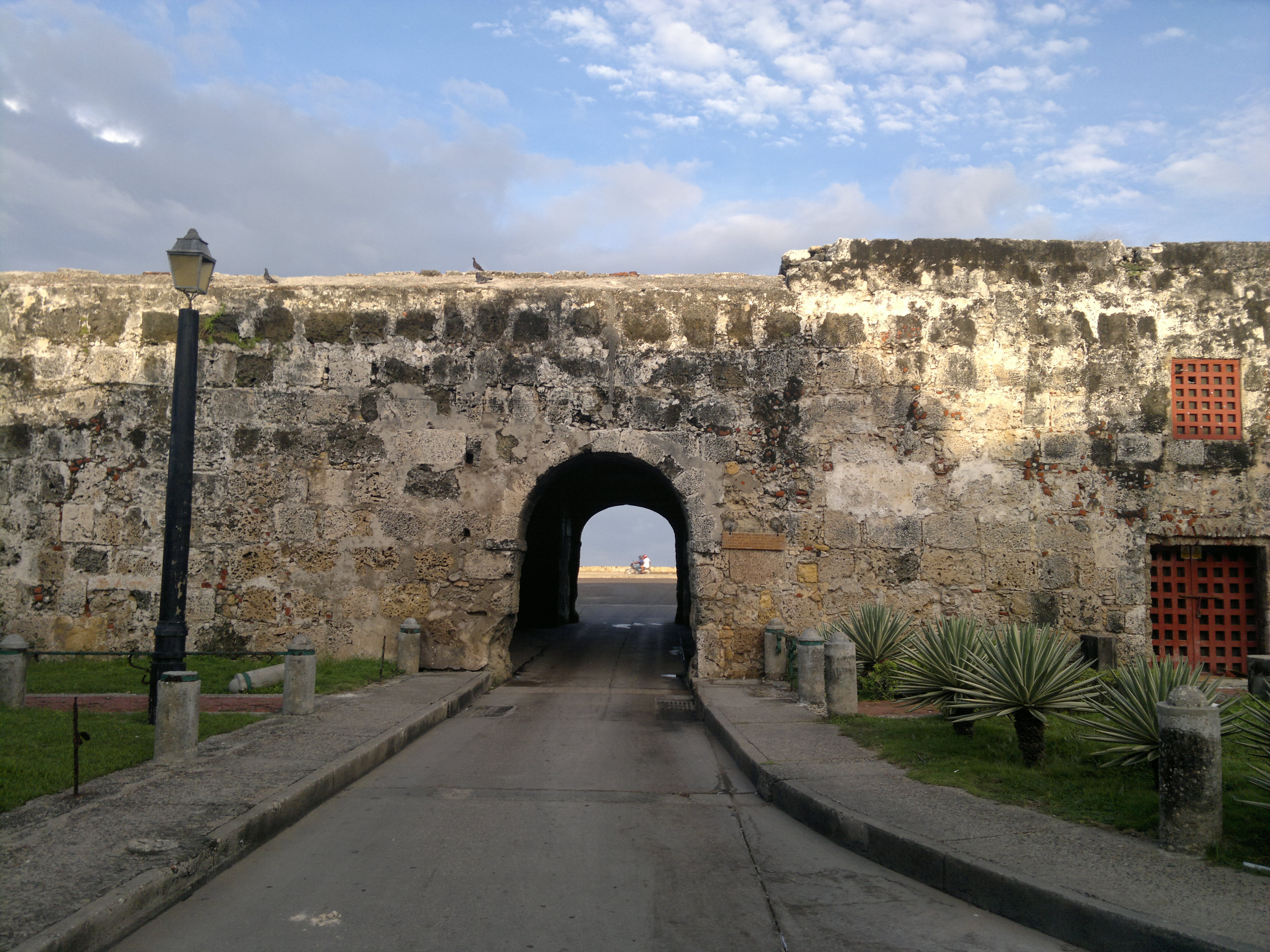
Old defensive curtain wall

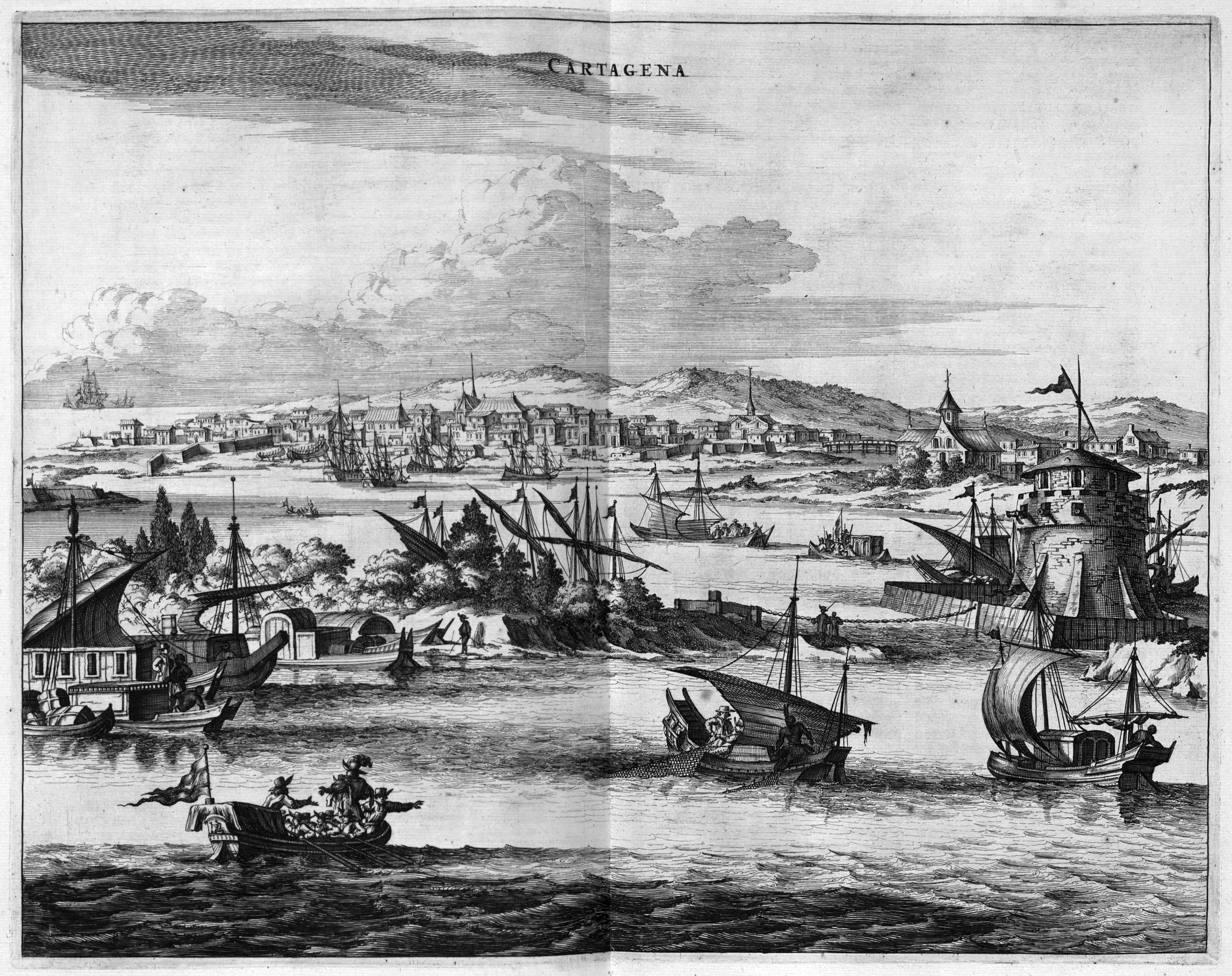
Cartagena, Colombia, ca. 1600

The town was constantly under threat from Dutch privateers, and during his term of office Murga strengthened the eastern fortifications. He ignored the work and views of the Italian engineer Cristóbal de Roda Antonelli, who had spent many years working on the fortifications. With experience in Flanders, Murga wanted to apply the principles of fortification that had been developed there, including opposing trenches and advanced Ravelins to hinder the approach of the enemy. In 1631 he used prisoners from the Anglo-French colonies of Nevis and Saint Kitts to fortify the bridge connecting the city with the Getsemaní suburb, building a Media Luna (half moon) gatehouse. This structure, with its unusual concave crescent wall, made it possible to instantly cut off the city from any approach from the mainland.

Based on his work on the fortifications, which included surrounding the city with heavy curtain walls, Murga has been called the master builder of the walled city of Cartagena, the "Marquis de las Murallas" (Marquis of the Walls).

=== Providence Island ===
The Providence Island colony was established by the English in 1630 on an island called Santa Catalina by the Spanish, now Isla de Providencia, to the east of what is now Nicaragua. A Puritan settlement, it became a base for privateers attacking Spanish shipping. The Spanish did not hear of the colony until 1635, when they captured some Englishmen in Portobelo, on the Isthmus of Panama. Francisco de Murga dispatched Captain Gregorio de Castellar y Mantilla and engineer Juan de Somovilla Texada to destroy the colony. The Spanish fleet anchored outside New Westminster in July 1635, and Castellar sent a messenger to demand the surrender of Providence island. Governor Philip Bell refused. The Spanish launched an attack at a poorly defended point, but were repelled by gunfire from the heights and were forced to retreat "in haste and disorder". In October 1635, Murga sent Castellar and Somovilla to attack the "Ysla de Mosquitos" on which more English were said to have established a base, but they were not able to locate the island.

=== Maroon problem ===
Murga had to deal with the problem of Cimarrones or Maroons, escaped slaves from Africa who had established independent settlements in the Cartagena region, who had been raiding and killing Indians and Spanish settlers. There were at least eight Maroon palenques, or illegal settlements, in the region. In 1631 Murga sent an expedition against a palenque "next to the Rio Grande of the Magdalena". They found it abandoned, and burned it down. In 1633 Murga attempted peace negotiations with the Palenque of Limón. When negotiations broke down, On 9 December 1633, Spanish soldiers attacked Limón, capturing more than eighty residents and after a trial executing thirteen, whose bodies were quartered and displayed publicly. The testimony of the Maroons at their trial was recorded in a 990-page dossier sent to King Philip IV of Spain, a valuable historical document.

=== Quarrels with the inquisition ===
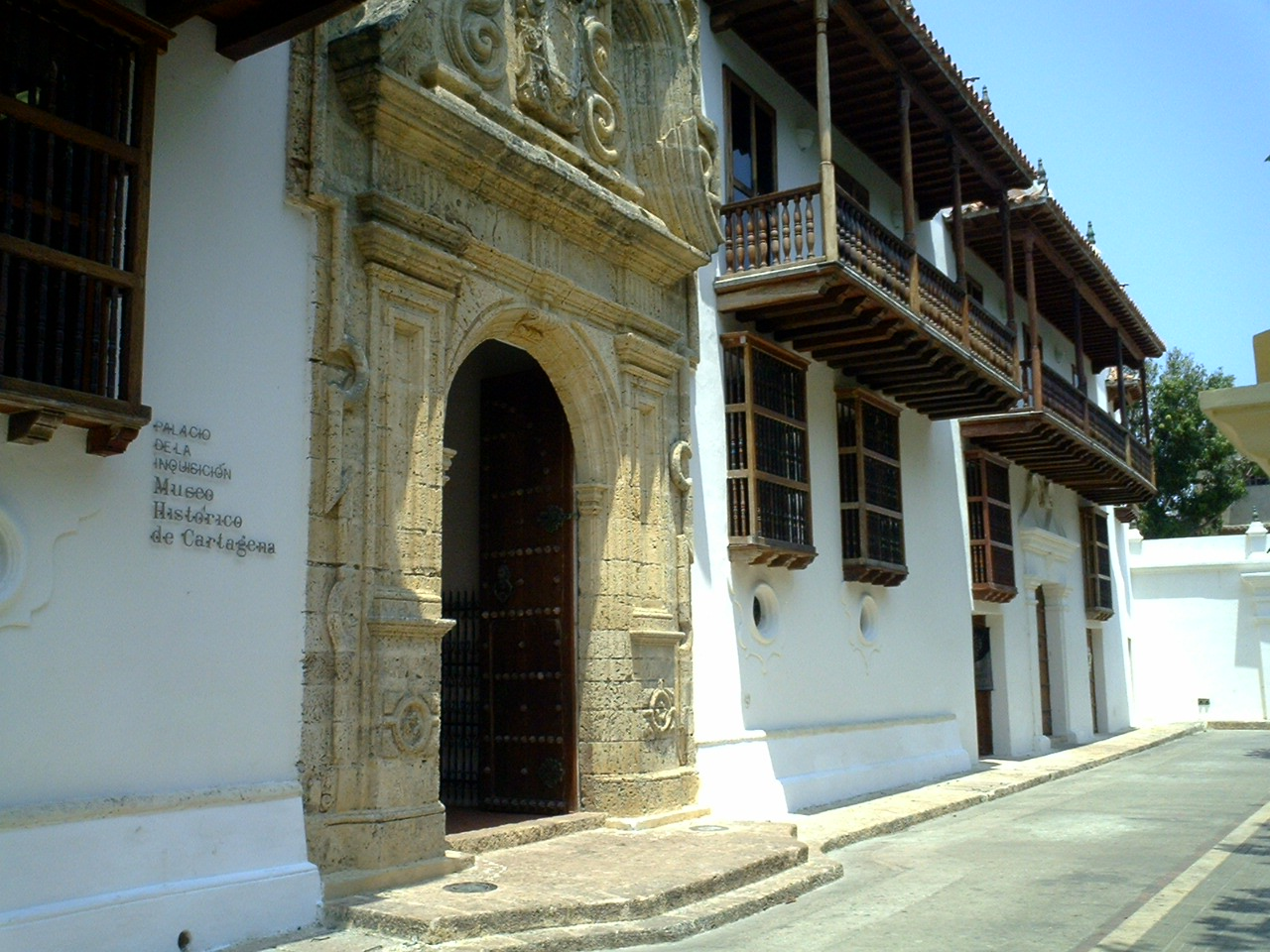
Palace of the Inquisition

As governor of Cartagena, Francisco de Murga was determined to curb the power of the inquisitors. He was widely supported by the population, to whom the inquisition was deeply unpopular. He became involved in particularly bitter quarrels with the inquisitor Vélez de Asas y Argos. He was described by the inquisitors in a letter of 12 December 1632 as the most dangerous man on earth, constantly harassing them. One day he released a negro who was being whipped through the streets for heresy. The inquisitors excommunicated him. He jailed the officials sent to notify him of this, holding them for 24 hours.

Eventually Murga asked for absolution, but when this was administered in a humiliating manner the Council of the Indies formally complained to the king. Although Velez y Argos was ordered to appear before a council in Madrid to answer Murga's accusations. The council hesitated to take drastic action for fear this would encourage other governors to curtail the authority of inquisitors, preventing them from doing their duty. Murga's death helped remove the problem, but the council recommended to the king that Velez y Argos not be allowed to return to Cartagena, and the king agreed. Eventually Asas y Argos was transferred to the Tribunal de México, in April 1637.

== Bibliography ==
- Alcedo, Antonio de; Arrowsmith, Aaron (1812). The Geographical and Historical Dictionary of America and the West Indies: Containing an Entire Translation of the Spanish Work of Colonel Don Antonio de Alcedo, with Large Additions and Compilations from Modern Voyages and Travels and from Original and Authentic Information. James Carpenter, ... Longman, Hurst, Rees, Orme and Brown, ... White, Cochrane and Company and Murray, ... London; Parker, Oxford; and Deighton, Cambridge. p. 328.
- Block, Kristen (2007). Faith and Fortune: Religious Identity and the Politics of Profit in the Seventeenth-century Caribbean. ISBN 978-0-549-70756-1.
- Escobar, Ricardo (2002). "Los CRIPTOJUDÍOS DE CARTAGENA DE INDIAS: UN ESLABÓN EN LA DIÁSPORA CONVERSA (1635-1649) ·". Anuario Colombiano de Historia Social y de la Cultura. 29.
- Latimer, Jon (2009-06-01). Buccaneers of the Caribbean: How Piracy Forged an Empire. Harvard University Press. p. 84. ISBN 978-0-674-03403-7.
- Lea, Henry Charles (2010-06-10). The Inquisition in the Spanish Dependencies: Sicily, Naples, Sardinia, Milan, the Canaries, Mexico, Peru, New Granada. Cambridge University Press. ISBN 978-1-108-01458-8.
- Marley, David (2005-08-31). Historic Cities of the Americas: An Illustrated Encyclopedia. ABC-CLIO. ISBN 978-1-57607-027-7.
- McKnight, Kathryn Joy; Garofalo, Leo (2009-11-25). Afro-Latino Voices: Narratives from the Early Modern Ibero-Atlantic World, 1550-1812. Hackett Publishing. ISBN 978-0-87220-993-0.
- Moses, Bernard (1966-11-14). The Spanish Dependencies in South America. Taylor & Francis. ISBN 978-0-7146-2034-3.
- Offen, Karl (March 2011). "La cartografía colonial de Centroamérica y el topónimo 'mosquito'". Asociación para el Fomento de los Estudios Históricos en Centroamérica. Archived from the original on 2018-06-19.
- Segovia Salas, Rodolfo (1996). "Las Fortificaciones de la Plaza". Las fortificaciones de Cartagena de Indias: Estrategia e historia (in Spanish). Áncora. ISBN 978-958-36-0025-8.
- Turchi, Maria Cristina (2009). "Cristóbal de Roda Antonelli". La Medida de El Dorado: Vida y empresas de emiliano-romañolos en las Américas (in Italian). Archived from the original on 2012-10-24.
