= José Ignacio de Cavero y Cárdenas =

New Spain and Colombian politician (1757–1834)

3rd Prefect Intendent of the Magdalena River and the Isthmus
- In office 4 March 1824 – 19 May 1824
- President: Francisco de Paula Santander y Omaña
- Preceded by: José Vicente Ucrós y de Herrera
- Succeeded by: Carlos Soublette

4th President of the Supreme Junta of Cartagena de Indias
- In office 1 September 1811 – 21 January 1812
- Preceded by: José María García de Toledo
- Succeeded by: José María del Real Hidalgo

Personal details
- Born: 29 June 1757 Mérida, Yucatán, Viceroyalty of New Spain
- Died: 29 August 1834 (aged 77) Cartagena de Indias, Cartagena, Republic of New Granada
- Spouse: María Teresa de Leguina y López Tagle
- Relations: Juan José Nieto Gil (son-in-law)
- Children: Josefa Teresa Plácida de los Dolores Cavero y Leguina
- Profession: Lawyer

José Ignacio de Cavero y Cárdenas (29 June 1757 – 17 August 1834) was a New Spain and Colombian lawyer and politician. A Precursor of the Independence of Colombia, as the 4th President of the Supreme Junta of Cartagena de Indias he was a signatory of the declaration of independence of the Cartagena Province from the Viceroyalty of the New Granada and the Kingdom of Spain, establishing a republic based in the concept of separation of powers, and abolishing the Tribunal of the Holy Office of the Inquisition. Cartagena would eventually join with other provinces to create the Republic of Colombia under President Simón Bolívar, and was appointed in 1824 by Vice President Francisco de Paula Santander y Omaña to serve as the 3rd Prefect Intendant of the Magdalena River and the Isthmus province, which now encompassed the former province of Cartagena as well as the provinces of Santa Marta, Riohacha, and the Isthmus.

== Personal life ==
Born on 29 June 1757 in Mérida, Yucatán then part of the Viceroyalty of New Spain, his parents were Diego Cavero Castro and Juana de Díaz Cárdenas.
