= List of governors of the Province of Cartagena =

The Province of Cartagena de Indias in Colombia was founded concurrently with the city of Cartagena, Colombia in 1533 by the conquistador Pedro de Heredia, thus fulfilling his part in a contract of conquest made with King Charles V of Spain. The town and province were named after Cartagena, Spain, the hometown of most of Heredia's sailors.

The province became independent during the 19th century, and essentially preserved its original territorial area, although it had changed names several times.

The following is a list of the governors or presidents of the Province of Cartagena, later known as the "Republic of Cartagena".

In response to the demands of the people, the Junta de Gobierno of Cartagena declared its independence from the Spanish Crown and the abolition of the Inquisition on November 11, 1811. The Junta issued an acta de independencia declaring: "the Province of Cartagena de Indias is from today, in fact and by law, a free, sovereign, and independent state." Leaders of the territory when it was an independent nation are also included here.

== Province of Cartagena de Indias (1533-1810) ==
The Province of Cartagena in its initial form lasted from 1533 to 1810, during which time the title of the province's chief executive was Governor. With exceptions in 1539 and 1540, provisional leaders served without that title. During the Viceroyalty of Peru, the administrative power of the governor diminished due to the presence of the Viceroy in Cartagena de Indias and its selection as the alternative capital of New Kingdom of Granada.

During this period, the corregidor, or alcalde mayor, of Cartagena de Indias had both judicial and administrative powers, while the colonial governor was the military and budgetary authority in the province and semi-corregidor of the capital city, which because of its economic importance had significant autonomy from Bogotá, and played a vital role in the balance of powers in New Granada.

In the 18th century Cartagena de Indias was the preeminent city of the New Kingdom of Granada, its port controlling most of the colony's trade. The Spanish government had built an imposing fortress, the Castillo San Felipe de Barajas, in a strategic location on the Hill of San Lázaro, which dominated all approaches to the city by land or sea. Cartagena controlled the region commercially, politically, and militarily, and served as headquarters for Spanish army and naval stations on the Caribbean coast.

In this list appears the title, name, length of the governorship and notes about the incumbent.

- 1. Pedro de Heredia (1533–1536) Founder of the city and the province.
- 2. Juan de Vadillo (1536–1537) Two streets in the city are named after him.
- 3. Juan de Santacruz (1538–1540)
- 4. Exc. Cartagena de Indias Cabildo (City Council) (1539–1540)
- 5. Alonso de Zurita (1540)
- 6. Francisco De Montaño (1540)
- 7. Miguel Díaz de Armendáriz (1544-1545)
- 8. Alonso López de Ayala (1546-1549)
- 9. Pedro de Heredia (1549–1554)
- 10. Dr. Juan Maldonado (1554–1555)
- 11. Jorge de Quintanilla (1555-1556)
- 12. Gonzalo Jiménez de Quesada (1556–1557)
- 13. Antonio de Castro, Interim governor
- 14. Francisco Velásquez (1557)
- 15. Juan de Busto y Villegas (1557–1562) Resisted the pirate attack of Martin Cote
- 16. Martin de la Sala (1562–1563)
- 17. Anton Davalos de Luna (1563–1567) Died in office of natural causes (disease)
- 18. Alonso de Vargas (1567) His rule lasted only 5 days and 3 hours; died in office from appendicitis.
- 19. Juan Lope de Orozco (1567) Interim governor
- 20. Martin de las Alas (1567–1570)
- 21. Pedro Fernandez Busto (1571–1572)
- 22. Francisco Bahamonde de Lugo (1572–1574) Died in office of natural causes
- 23. Hernan Suarez de Villalobos (1574) (interim)
- 24. Dr. Francisco Mejía (1574–1575)
- 25. Pedro Fernandez Busto (1575–1586)
- 26. Pedro de Lodeña (1586–1593)
- 27. Pedro de Acuña y De los Monteros, Knight of Sovereign Military Order of Malta (1593–1601)
- 28. Gerónimo de Zuazo y Casasola, Knight of the Order of Santiago (1601–1606), Died in office of natural causes. Initiated many public works and began the construction of the city government palace.
- 29. Francisco Sarmiento de Sotomayor (1606) Interim.
- 30. Diego Fernández de Velasco, Knight of the Order of Alcantara, Marquis of Solaner
- 31. Pedro de Acuña y De los Monteros (1614–1619)
- 32. Garci Girón de Loayza, Count of Villasañudo (1619–1625)
- 33. Diego de Escobar y Olañeta, Marquis of Mohedana de la Frontera, Knight of the Order of Santiago (1625–1628) Finished the city government palace and refurbished many other civil buildings.
- 34. Francisco de Berrio y de Garriztabengoa, Lord of Azcárate (1628) Interim.
- 35. Ing. Francisco de Murga y Veleidén (1629–1636) Began the works on the city walls, called "Marquis de las Murallas" (Marquis of the walls) in recognition of his efficiency.
- 36. Pedro de Fidalgo y Oreiro, Knight of the Order of Santiago (1636)
- 37. Nicolas de Larraspuru y de Villanueva (1636–1637) Interim.
- 38. Gonzalo de Herrera y de la Calzada, Marquis of Villalta (1637) The Villalta manor was the first noble estate established in New Granada, in 1540, the governor held other minor titles but acquired this one through marriage.
- 39. Vicente de los Reyes Villalobos, (1637–1638)
- 40. Field Marshal Melchor de Aguilera (1638–1641)
- 41. Gen. Diego Fernández de Córdoba, Marquis of Guadalcázar, Knight of the Order of Santiago (1640–1641) Not to be confused him with his father of the same name, who was Viceroy of New Spain and of Peru (1640–1641)
- 42. Hortuno de Aldape (1641–1643)
- 43. Gen. Luis Fernandez de Córdoba, Knight of the Order of Santiago (1643–1646)
- 44. Clemente Soriano (1647)
- 45. Pedro Zapata de Moxos (1647–1648)
- 46. Fernando de la Rivaguero, Knight of the Order of Santiago (1648–1654)
- 47. Pedro Zapata de Moxos (1654) Interim.
- 48. Francisco Rexis Corbalán (1654) Interim.
- 49. Juan Pérez de Guzmán (1654–1659)
- 50. Diego de Portugal y de Sintra, Grandee of Spain Member of the Portuguese Royal Family (1660–1664). Only Spanish royal to govern in New Granada.
- 51. Benito de Figueroa y Barrantes (1664–1667)
- 52. Field Marshal Antonio de Vergara Azcarate (1668) Spanish royal colonial Treasurer, Knight of the Order of Santiago, accountant of the Tribunal de cuentas, Colonial Governor of Cartagena de Indias, Mérida and, Maracaibo, mayor of Santa Fe Bogotá in the New Kingdom of Granada,
- 53. Pedro De Ulloa y Rivadeneira (1669–1673)
- 54. Alonso de Mercado y Villacorta (1673–1674)
- 55. José Daza y Guzmán (1675–1679)
- 56. Gen. Rafael Capsir y Sanz (1679–1683) during his administration the Catholic Church imposed the Cessatio a divinis, forbidding the clergy from celebrating the divine offices of the church in Cartagena.
- 57. Juan de Pando y Estrada (1684–1686)
- 58. Francisco de Castro y de Castro (1687–1688) Subjected to a residencia by the King because of many the acts of violence he ordered during his tenure, it is widely believed that he was severely mentally ill.
- 59. Martin de Zevallos y de la Cerda (1687–1692)
- 60. Diego de Portugal y de Sintra, Grandee of Spain, (1692–1695) Second term.
- 61. Field Marshal Diego de los Rios y Quesada (1695–1697) Died defending the city during the Raid of Pointis in 1698. Not to be confused with his great-grandson who was last governor of the Philippines
- 62. Pedro de Olivera Ordoñez (1697–1699)
- 63. Juan Díaz Pimienta y Zaldivar (1699–1705) Knight of the Order of Calatrava, initiated the reconstruction of the city.
- 64. Lazaro de Herrera y Leyba (1706)
- 65. José Zúñiga y La Cerda (1706–1712)
- 66. Field Marshal Jeronimo de Badillo (1713–1716) Finished the reconstruction of the public buildings and oversaw the beginning of the economic expansion of the city in the 18th century.
- 67. Field Marshal Francisco de Baloco y Leigrave, (1716–1717), the Baloco street in the Cartagena de Indias is in his memory.
- 68. Jeronimo de Badillo (1717–1719)
- 69 Carlos de Sucre (1719–1720)
- 70. Alberto de Bertodano y Dolores (1720–1724)
- 71. Col. Luis de Aponte (1724–1728)
- 72. Field Marshal Juan José de Andía, Marquis of Villahermosa (1728–1730)
- 73. Col. Antonio de la Salas (1730–1737)
- 74. Pedro José Fidalgo (1737–1740)
- 75.Melchor de Navarrete Marquis of la Defensa de San Luis (1740–1743)
- 76. Basilio de Gante (1743–1749)
- 77. Lt. Ignacio de la Sala, son of the 64th. governor, finished many public works and is known as the builder of the Cádiz puerta de tierra. (1749–1752)
- 78. Fernando Morillo Velarde Knight of the Order of Alcantara (1752–1753) a distant relative of Pablo Morillo who destroyed the city sixty years later.
- 79. Lt. Ignacio de la Sala (1753)
- 80. Diego Tabares (1753–1761)
- 81. José de Sobremonte Marquis de Sobremonte, (1761–1766) built many public buildings including the first bullring in New Granada, now a Viceroyalty, and finished the city walls.
- 82. Fernando Morillo Velarde Knight of the Order of Alcantara (1766–1770) Second term.
- 83. Gregorio de la Sierra (1770–1772)
- 84. Roque de Quiroga (1772–1774)
- 85. Col Juan Díaz de Torrezar y Pimienta, Knight of the Order of Charles III. (1774–1780) Built many hospitals and opened many roads, well remembered for his efficiency. He was the son of the 59th governor. Became Viceroy of New Granada after his governorship ended, but died shortly after.
- 86. Roque de Quiroga (1782–1785)
- 87. Col. Juan Díaz de Torrezar y Pimienta (1781–1787)
- 88. José Carrión y Andrade (1787–1789)
- 89. Antonio de Narváez y de la Torre (1789) Interim.
- 90. Joaquin de Cañaveral y Ponce (1789–1796) During his tenure the economic expansion reached a peak and stabilized; opened the city's Consulate of Commerce.
- 91. Field Marshal Anastasio Zejudo (1796–1808), Died in office, put down a negro revolt instigated by the newly independent Haiti slave republic.
- 92. Francisco de Montes (1809–1810) Deposed by a Junta after the events of the Peninsular War.

== Peninsular War, Revolution and Independence (1810-1820) ==
The events of the Peninsular War and the convocation of Juntas throughout Spain transformed the traditional order. Although everything remained the same, the instability of this period makes almost impossible to state what was the precise status of the province.

- 92. Blas de Soria Santacruz, assumed as chief of the Junta of Cartagena de Indias with two vocals: Antonio de Narváez y de la Torre and Tomás De Andrés Torres. (1810-1810)

This triumvirate was fragile and was replaced by a "Supreme Junta" where the locals had more power, this could be regarded as a sort of fight between the virtually nonexistent royal power and the city councils.

- 93. Dr. Jose Maria Garcia de Toledo y De Madariaga Marquis of Valdehoyos (1810-1810) under the title of President of the Junta.
- 94. Gen. Antonio de Narváez y de la Torre Count of Santa Cruz de La Torre (1810-1810) with the title of President-Governor

By this time chaos dominated the political scene, with many advocating independence of the viceroyalty, others of the province, others the return of the Ancien regime, while yet others, desiring stability, wanted to maintain the status quo under the present governorship, or whatever title given the office, which always represented a short-lived victory of one faction or another.

- 95. Jose Davila (1810–1811) with the title of Governor
- 96. Dr. José María Del Real y Mirandela (1811-1811) with the title of General Supreme Governor
- 97. José Ignacio de Cavero y Cárdenas (1811-1811) with the title of President of the Junta
- 98. Dr. José María Del Real y Mirandela (1811-1811) Second time
- 99. Manuel Rodriguez de Torices (1811-1811) as Prefect of the Constituent Assembly of Cartagena de Indias

== Intendency of the department of Magdalena (1820-1832) ==
In August 1820, the Province of Cartagena was annexed to Greater Colombia and the revolutionary wars finally ended. In 1821 Cartagena and Santa Marta provinces merged in the Intendency of Magdalena Department, and were governed by a Prefect Intendent from Cartagena de Indias.

- 100. Lt. Col. Jose Maria Córdoba (1820)
- 101. Dr. Pedro Gual Escandón (1820–1821)
- 102. Col. Jacinto Lara (1821)
- 103. Don Manuel de Romay y Riverol, Grandee of Spain, Lord of Marín de Arriba, (1821). Under the title of Political Governor of Cartagena.
- 104. Gen. Mariano Montilla (1821–1822) The first to serve as Prefect Intendent in an organized Intendency.
- 105. Col. Jose Vicente Ucros y de Herrera (1822–1824)
- 106. Dr. José Ignacio de Cavero y Cárdenas (1824)
- 107. Gen. Carlos Soublette (1824–1825)

== Sovereign State of Bolivar (1863-1886) ==
Sr. Coronel Máximo Lorduy Cárdenas (1864;1866) Coronel de la Guarda Nacional. Alcalde de la ciudad de Cartagena de Indias en 1864 y 1866. Artesano (oficio heredado de su ascendiente el Maestro carpintero Pantaleón Lorduy). Ver: Luis Carlos Lorduy Vergara. Lorduy, Genealogía de un Apellido. Cartagena: Casa Editorial, 2010. https://lorduygenealogia.wixsite.com/aniversario ==Department of Bolivar (1886-today)==
