= Sergio Cravero =

Italian engineer and businessman

Sergio Cravero is an Italian engineer and businessman, who served in Fiat group.

== Early life and education ==
Cravero was born in Turin. He received a degree in mechanical engineering.

== Career ==
Cravero joined the Fiat group in 1986. He served as the head of marketing of the firm from 2005 to 2009. He was the chief executive officer (CEO) of Italian car maker Alfa Romeo from January 2009 to January 2010. Harald Wester replaced him as the CEO of Alfa Romeo. Cravero left the company in August 2012.
