= Chalfont =

Chalfont may refer to:

== United Kingdom ==
- A collection of villages in Buckinghamshire, England known collectively as "The Chalfonts":
  - Chalfont St Giles
  - Chalfont St Peter
  - Little Chalfont
- Chalfont Common, in Buckinghamshire, England
- Chalfont & Latimer station, a station on the London Underground Metropolitan Line which serves The Chalfonts
- Chalfont Viaduct, a railway bridge in Gerrards Cross, close to Chalfont St Peter
- Leeds Castle, used as the fictional seat of the Dukes of Chalfont in the 1949 Ealing Comedy Kind Hearts and Coronets

== United States ==
- Chalfont, Pennsylvania, borough located in Bucks County, Pennsylvania
  - Chalfont station, a SEPTA train station located in Chalfont, Pennsylvania

== People ==
- Alun Jones, Baron Chalfont, politician and historian, known as Lord Chalfont

== See also ==
- Chalfont Road, Oxford, England
