= Seer Green =

Village in Buckinghamshire, England

Coordinates: 51.618°N 0.605°W

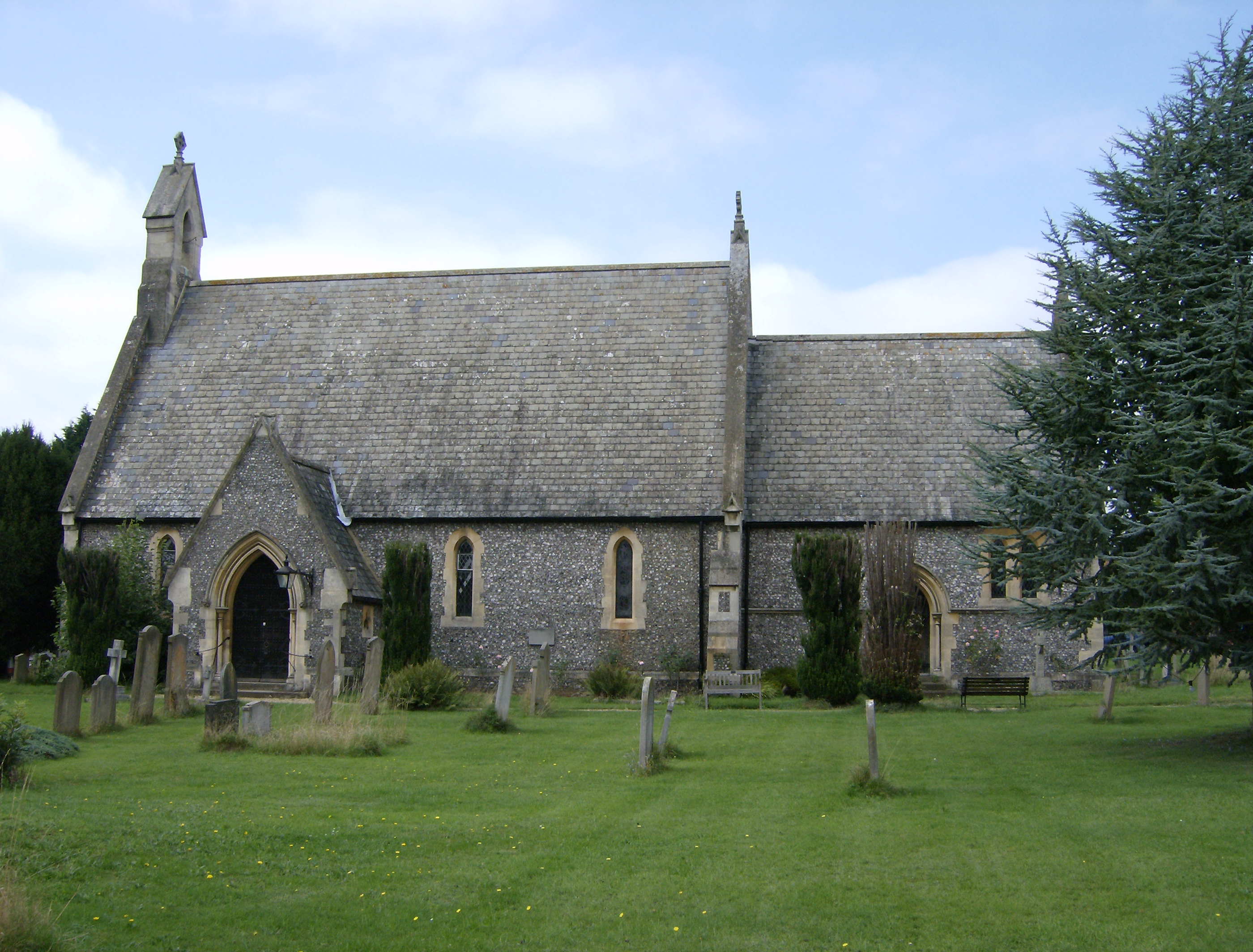
- Holy Trinity Parish Church

- Location within Buckinghamshire
- Population: 2,400 (2021)
- OS grid reference: SU9691
- Civil parish: Seer Green
- Unitary authority: Buckinghamshire
- Ceremonial county: Buckinghamshire
- Region: South East
- Country: England
- Sovereign state: United Kingdom
- Post town: BEACONSFIELD
- Postcode district: HP9
- Dialling code: 01494
- Police: Thames Valley
- Fire: Buckinghamshire
- Ambulance: South Central
- UK Parliament: Chesham and Amersham

Seer Green is a village and civil parish in Buckinghamshire, England. It is in the Chiltern Hills, 1.8 miles (2.9 km) east-north-east of Old Beaconsfield and 1.8 miles (2.9 km) south-west of Chalfont St Giles.

== History ==
According to the Chilterns Conservation Board the toponym "Seer" is derived from the Norman French for "dry or arid place". However "sere" is also the Middle English word for dry - derived from Old English "seare", additionally the Buckinghamshire government website notes that both "sear\sere" and "grene" appear to be of English origin. Village legend has it that the "Seer" refers to King Arthur's Court visiting the area and locals consulting his "seer" Merlin.

When the Domesday Book was complied in 1086 Seer Green was a part of Farnham Royal, governed by Bertram I de Verdun - the land in pre-conquest England having previously belonged to Princess Godgifu. The land was passed down by the Verduns to their descendants until through marriage it was passed onto the Furnival, Neville and Talbot families.

In a manorial roll dating back to Henry III's reign in 1232 it was called La Sere, after this other recorded names during the Medieval Era, in chronological order, have been La Cere, Le Shere, La Zere, Sera and Sere.

In 1541 Seer Green along with the rest of the manor of Farnham became a holding of Henry VIII when he exchanged land with the 5th Earl of Shrewsbury.

The oldest building in Seer Green is Hall Place which is a Grade II listed building.

The Holy Trinity Church was built in 1846. It is brick and flint with lancet windows. There is also a Baptist church.

Seer Green became a separate parish in 1866, having previously been a hamlet of the parish of Farnham Royal. It had levied a separate poor rate before then.

Until the early part of the 20th century Seer Green was mainly an agricultural village, known for its cherry orchards. The remnants of some of these orchards remain and in honour of this tradition the local school holds a "Cherry Pie Fair" every summer which usually involves a fancy dress parade and a procession through the village.

== Amenities ==
The parish has a Church of England primary school. The village has a Scout troop that is successful in regional competitions. The village youth football club, Seer Green United, has under 7s, under 8s and under 13s teams. The village is close to Hodgemoor Wood, a Site of Special Scientific Interest.

Seer Green and Jordans railway station is on the Chiltern Main Line between Beaconsfield and Gerrards Cross. The station was originally called "Beaconsfield Golf Club", the golf club being next door, but the name was later changed to reflect its position between the two settlements. Bus route 104, provided by Carousel, also runs through the village.

Junction 2 of the M40 motorway is nearby.

== Notable people ==
Notable residents have included:

- Frederick Forsyth, author
- Ian McCaskill, weather presenter
- Jon Anderson, musician and lead singer of Yes

== Demography ==
=== 2001 census ===
==== Ethnic and religious background ====
At the 2001 UK census, the Seer Green electoral ward had a population of 2,267, the ethnicity of 98% of residents was reported as being white which was higher than Chiltern District and England as a whole. The 2001 census had also recorded that the residents were 0.6% mixed race, 0.8% Asian and 0.1% black which is significantly lower than the average for England.

The 2001 census also revealed that the place of birth of residents was 88.7% United Kingdom, 0.7% Republic of Ireland, 2.6% other Western European countries, and 8% elsewhere - in total 11.3% of residents were born outside UK, which was higher than England on average. Religion was recorded as 78% Christian (which was higher than the 72% average for England and Wales). Of the rest - 0.2% were recorded as being Buddhist, 0.3% Hindu, 0% Sikh and 0.3% Muslim - which was significantly lower than England and Wales as a whole, however 0.7% were recorded as Jewish which was higher than the average for England and Wales. 14% were recorded as having no religion, 0.4% had an alternative religion and 6.1% did not state their religion.

Seer Green comparative demography
2001 UK Census	Seer Green ward	Chiltern District	England
Population	2,267	89,228	49,138,831
Foreign born	11.3%	9.3%	9.2%
White	98%	95.5%	90.9%
Asian	0.8%	2.8%	4.6%
Black	0.1%	0.3%	2.3%
Mixed	0.6%		1.3%
Other	0.5%		0.4%
Christian	78%	74.7%	71.7%
Muslim	0.3%	1.9%	3.1%
Hindu	0.3%	0.5%	1.1%
No religion	14.0%	15.0%	14.6%
Unemployed	1.3%	1.7%	3.3%
Retired	13.7%	14.6%	13.5%

==== Economic Activity ====
The economic activity of residents aged 16–74 was 40.6% in full-time employment, 11.2% in part-time employment, 13.6% self-employed, 1.3% unemployed, 2.2% students with jobs, 3.6% students without jobs, 13.7% retired, 9.9% looking after home or family, 2.1% permanently sick or disabled and 1.8% economically inactive for other reasons.

Economic Activity	Percentage
Full-time employment	40.6%
Part-time employment	11.2%
Self-employed	13.6%
Unemployed	1.3%
Students with jobs	2.2%
Students without jobs	3.6%
Retired	13.7%
Looking after home or family	9.9%
Permanently sick or disabled	2.1%
Economically inactive for other reasons	1.8%

The industry of employment of residents was 14% retail, 10.8% manufacturing, 5.5% construction, 25.7% real estate, 9.3% health and social work, 8% education, 6.3% transport and communications, 3.5% public administration, 2.3% hotels and restaurants, 4.9% finance, 1.1% agriculture and 8.6% other. Compared with national figures, the ward had a relatively high proportion of workers in real estate, and a relatively low proportion in public administration, hotels and restaurants. Of the ward's residents aged 16–74, 36.2% had a higher education qualification or the equivalent, compared with 19.9% nationwide.

Industry	Percentage
Retail	14%
Manufacturing	10.8%
Construction	5.5%
Real estate	25.7%
Health and social work	9.3%
Education	8%
Transport and communications	6.3%
Public administration	3.5%
Hotels and restaurants	2.3%
Finance	4.9%
Agriculture	1.1%
Other	8.6%

=== 2021 census ===
According to the 2021 census Seer Green had a population of 2,400 compared to 57,112,500 in England overall. Asians were 3.7% - compared to 9.6% in England overall. Black people were 0.5% compared to 4.2% in England overall Mixed or multiple ethnic groups were 3.4% compared to 3.0% in England overall. White were 91.8% compared to 81.0% in England overall. Other ethnic groups were 0.6% compared to 2.2% in England overall

According to the 2021 census, religious affiliation was as follows: No religion 34.3% completed to 36.7% in England overall. Christian 55.7% compared to 46.3% in England overall. Buddhist 0.7% compared to 0.5% in England overall. Hindu 0.9% compared to 1.8% in England overall. Jewish 0.8% compared to 0.5% in England overall. Muslim 1.0% compared to 6.7% in England overall. Sikh 0.7% compared to 0.9% in England overall. Other religion 0.4% Compared to 0.6% in England overall. Not answered was 5.4% compared to 6.0% in England overall.

2021 census data %
Religious affiliation	Seer Green	England
No religion	34.3	36.7
Christian	55.7	46.3
Buddhist	0.7	0.5
Hindu	0.9	1.8
Jewish	0.8	0.5
Muslim	1.0	6.7
Sikh	0.7	0.9
Other religion	0.4	0.6
Not answered	5.4	6.0
