= William Bramley-Moore =

English priest and author

The Reverend William Joseph Bramley-Moore
- Vicar of Gerrard's Cross
- Church: Church of England
- In office: 1860–1869
- Successor: William Addington Bathurst
- Other post: Curate at Brenchley (1855)

Orders
- Ordination: Deacon: 1855; Priest: 1856

Personal details
- Born: 1831
- Died: 1918 (aged 86–87)
- Denomination: Church of England
- Residence: London (Woburn Square and Russell Square); Gerrard's Cross
- Parents: John Bramley-Moore (father); Seraphina Pennell (mother)
- Spouse: Ella Bradshaw Jordan (m. 1865)
- Occupation: Evangelical priest
- Profession: Author
- Education: Eton College; Trinity College, Cambridge

William Joseph Bramley-Moore (1831–1918) was an English priest of the Church of England and author. He is known for his historical novel The Six Sisters of the Valleys (1864), set in Piedmont in 1665, with a strong anti-Catholic tone.

== Life ==
He was the eldest son of John Bramley-Moore and his wife Seraphina Pennell, who married in 1830 in Rio de Janeiro and moved in 1833 to Liverpool where John Moore (as he was then) was a merchant. His family background was described by Nathaniel Hawthorne, invited in 1854 by John Bramley-Moore to a dinner at Aigburth, to meet the novelist Samuel Warren. He described the parents as "violent tories, fanatics for the Established Church" and followers of the evangelical Hugh M'Neile (heard as McMill by Hawthorne), the "present Low-Church Pope of Liverpool". Conversation was against the Tractarians and Roman Catholic influence, and with more talk about money from John than Hawthorne was used to with the English upper classes. In Seraphina he found a Calvinist of a familiar type, "outrageously religious" as well as vulgar.

Bramley-Moore was educated at Eton College. He matriculated at Trinity College, Cambridge in 1849, graduating B.A. in 1853 and M.A. in 1857. He was ordained deacon in 1855, becoming curate at Brenchley for a year. He was ordained priest in 1856. He was travelling in Italy in 1857 when he and his companion were attacked, the companion dying of wounds. He was vicar of Gerrard's Cross from 1860 to 1869. From 1863 his father bought and improved nearby property.

Crockford's Clerical Directory for 1872 showed no further living taken by Bramley-Moore after 1869, his replacement at Gerrard's Cross being William Addington Bathurst (1839–1922). In later life he lived in London, at 19 Woburn Square and then at 26 Russell Square. William Hechler gave a talk on biblical chronology at 26 Russell Square in 1892.

== Works ==
Bramley-Moore's single literary work was The Six Sisters of the Valley, a three-volume novel published 1864, and set in the period of the Savoyard–Waldensian wars. The plot is based on the story recorded by the Waldensian pastor Jean Léger, and commented on by Alexis Muston, of six brothers who married six sisters and brought up a large family group, who suffered religious persecution. The reviewer in the Illustrated London News, conceding the historicity of the material, objected to the treatment: "Horror is piled upon horror". Bramley-Moore had visited the area on his 1857 tour in Italy.

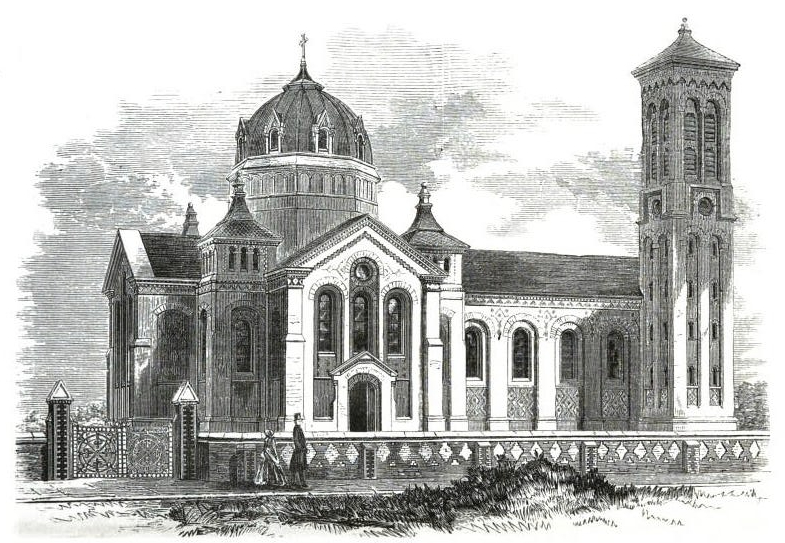
St James Church, Gerrards Cross, 1859 engraving from The First Sabbath at Gerrard's Cross

- The First Sabbath at Gerrard's Cross, and Other Memorials (1859). St James Church, Gerrards Cross was a new church, consecrated in 1859, and dedicated to the memory of George Alexander Reid. It was built on land at Fulmer Common given by the Duke of Somerset, to a design by William Tite, a friend of the Reid family who funded the work. Appointment to the living was by the Simeon Trust.
- The Great Oblation (1864), theology.
- “They have done what they could" (1866), on the South American Mission Society.
- The Seven Cries from Calvary (1867)
- Hymns for the Feasts: And Other Verses (1878)
- Marturia : or the testimony of ancient records and monuments in the British Museum to the historical accuracy of Holy Scripture (2nd edition 1901).
- The Church's Forgotten Hope (1905)
- Ancient Tyre and Modern England (1906)
- The Cherubim of Glory (1917)

He was the editor for Cassell of The Book of Martyrs, revised, which ran to a number of editions from 1866. This was a derived work, illustrated by engravings, based on Foxe's Book of Martyrs, from the 16th century. It was brought up to date with the 1866 killings at Barletta in southern Italy of the pastor Gaetano Giannini and five others in anti-Protestant riots. The engravings were by William Luson Thomas.

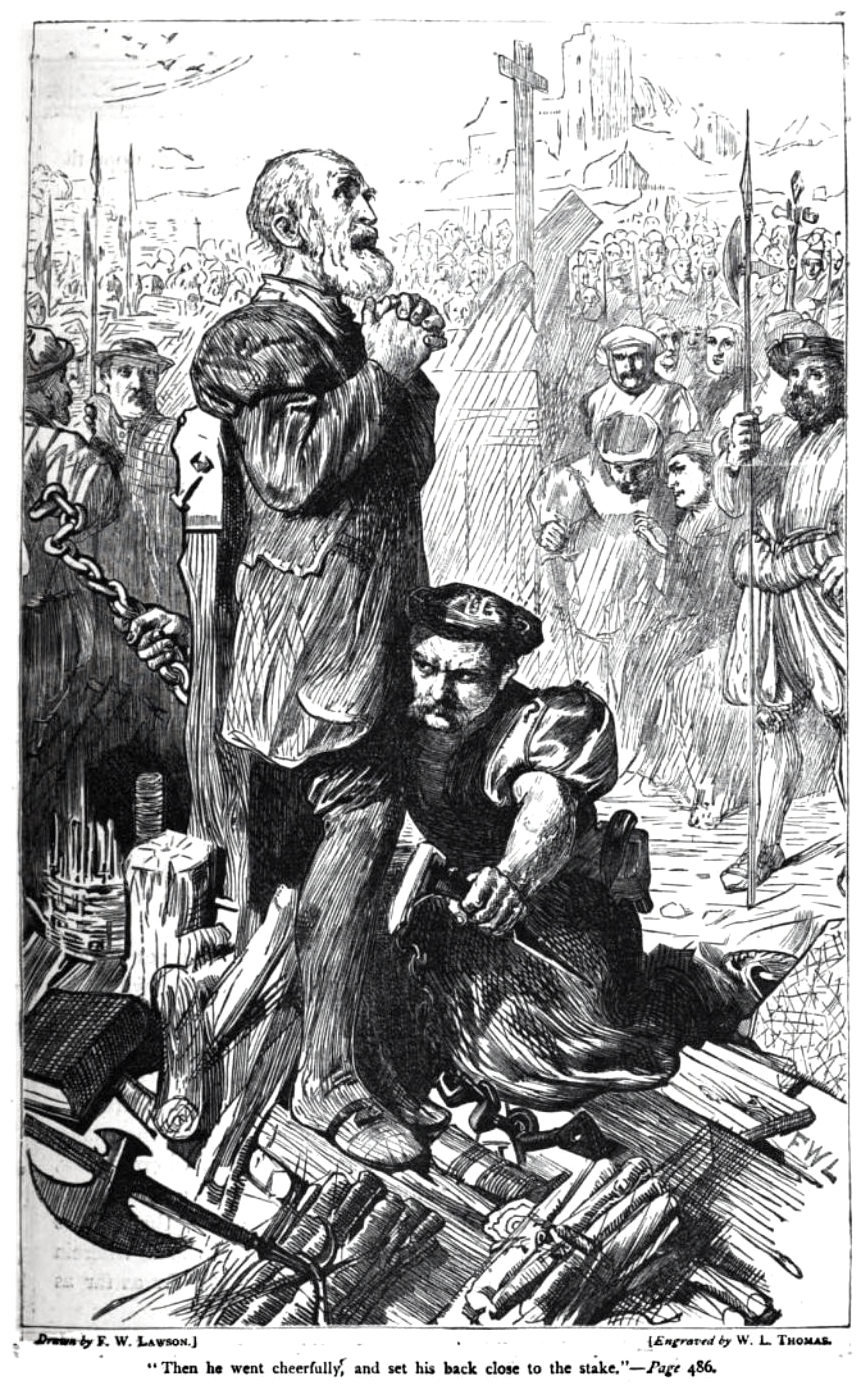
The martyrdom of Rawlins White, c.1555, from The Book of Martyrs, revised

== Family ==
Bramley-Moore married in 1865 Ella Bradshaw Jordan, third daughter of Swinfen Jordan of Clifton. They had six sons and four daughters, according to a Who's Who entry; but there were verifiably more sons (see below). This was a first cousin marriage: Swinfen Jordan married Louisa Pennell, one of the sisters of Seraphina, Bramley-Moore's mother. They were both among the 22 children of William Pennell, British consul in Brazil, as was "Nony" Croker who married Sir George Barrow, 2nd Baronet, adopted daughter of John Wilson Croker, who himself married the eldest of the sisters, Rosamund Carrington Pennell, in 1806.

The sons included:

- John Bramley-Moore (born 1876), educated at Malvern College, leaving in 1893 and becoming a tea planter in Ceylon. He served in the Merchant Navy. He married in 1909 Selma Amelia Grierson, daughter of Mr and Mrs H. G. Grierson of 66 Clapham Road, Bedford. John at that time had the title and rank of Captain RFRA (i.e. Royal Fleet Reserve A). During 1910, he was living at Woolacombe, and joined the British Medical Association. In 1922, licensed LMSSA (Licence in Medicine and Surgery of the Society of Apothecaries), he was in British North Borneo. Under the name Zelma Bramley-Moore, Selma (1890–1983) was known as a writer.
- Alwyn Bramley-Moore (1878–1916), educated at Malvern College, leaving in summer 1895. He emigrated to Canada later that year. He served in the Canadian Expeditionary Force.
- William Esmonde Bramley-Moore (born 1868), third son. MD, educated at Chigwell School. As Esmonde Bramley, he led a theatrical company of the Edwardian period. He served in the Royal Army Medical Corps during World War I. His daughter Ellaline married in 1925, as his second wife, Sir Berkeley Vincent.
- Leslie Bramley-Moore, matriculated at Trinity College, Cambridge in 1895. He then collaborated with Karl Pearson and Alice Lee, as co-author of the paper Mathematical contributions to the theory of evolution. VI. Reproductive or Genetic Selection. Part I. Theoretical (1898). He took his B.A. degree in 1908.
- Alfred Arthur Bramley-Moore (born 1881) was educated at Winchester College. He served in the Second Anglo-Boer War.
- Swinfen Bramley-Moore MC, served in the Army Service Corps.

Edward Bramley-Moore, fifth son, drowned on the high seas at age 15 in 1887 "while in the execution of his duty".

Of the daughters:

- Lucy Seraphine Ardoine (born 1869), was the first daughter, after three sons had been born. She married in 1913 Maurice Magnus; they separated in 1917.
- Millicent Emma (1870–1949) was an etcher. She married in 1899 the Rev. George Harris of Christ's Hospital.
