= Edmund Ware =

Edmund Ware may refer to:

- Edmund Ware (sculptor) (1883–1960), British teacher and sculptor
- Edmund Asa Ware (1837–1885), American educator and president of Atlanta University

== See also ==
- Edmund Ware Sinnott (1888–1968), American botanist and educator
- Edmond Warre (1837–1920), English rower and head master of Eton College
