= St Huberts Cottages =

Listed Building in Buckinghamshire

Coordinates: 51°34′46″N 0°33′10″W

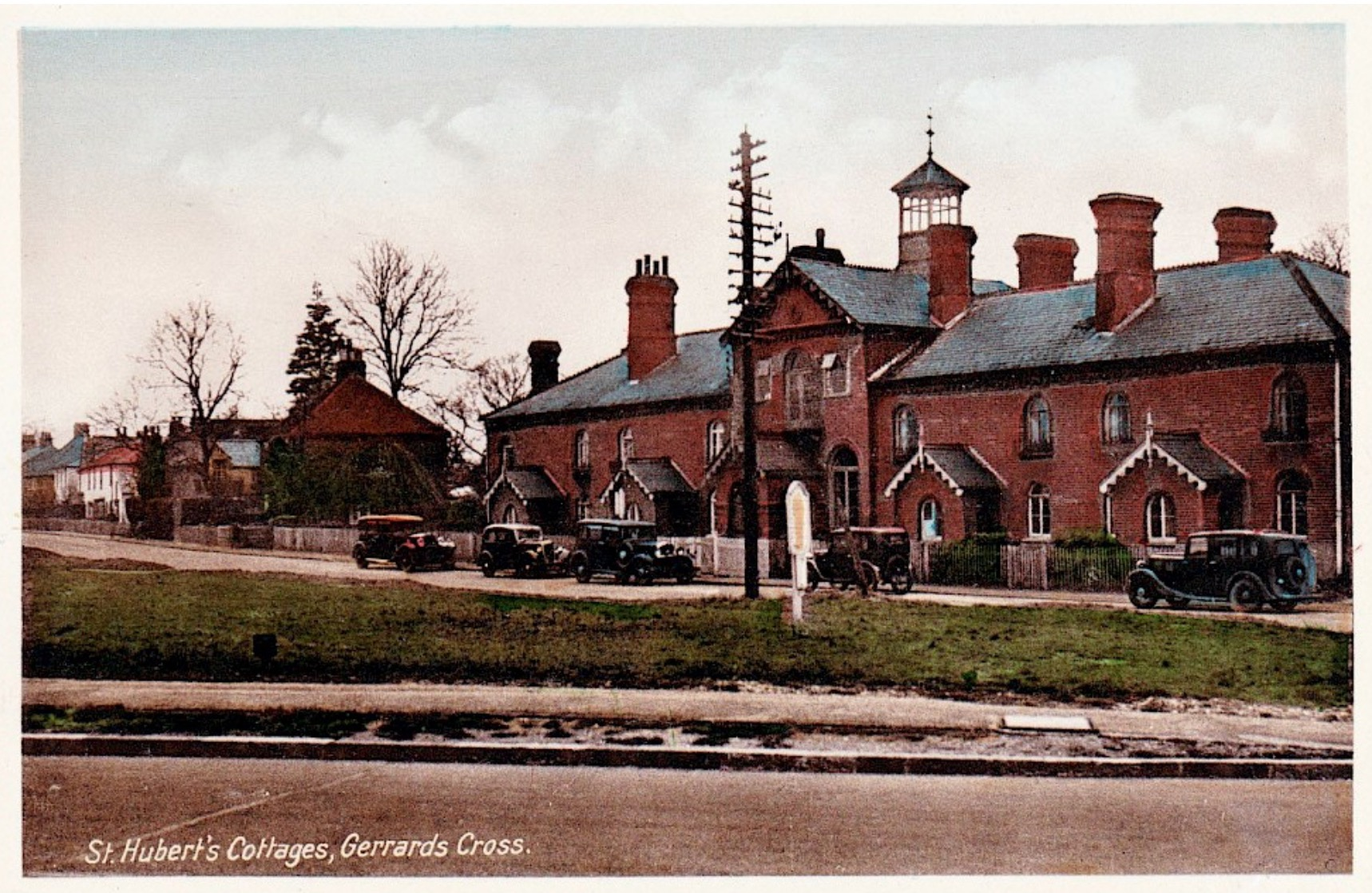
An early-20th-century postcard depicting St Huberts Cottages

St Huberts Cottages are a row of Grade II listed dwellings in Gerrards Cross, Buckinghamshire, England, built c.1866 by the Northern Irish author Thomas Mayne Reid. They form part of the Gerrards Cross Conservation Area and face a 79-acre common (with 62 acres of managed woodland) which is managed by Gerrards Cross Parish Council on behalf of the Lord of the Manor of Chalfont St Peter.

The cottages are described in their official list entry (1985) as

originally a terrace of eight cottages with central Reading Room. Brick; machine tile roof with dog-toothed cornice. Two storeys. Central advanced and gabled Reading Room. Ground floor with gabled porch and flanking arched windows. First floor with French doors opening onto a balcony with wrought iron railings and flanked by modern windows. Wings each with two gabled porches each flanked by arched casements above having balconies with iron railings.

Old photographs show that the main building and the porches were originally roofed with a combination of plain clay tiles and scalloped clay tiles with ridge crests. Nikolaus Pevsner describes them as "charming" in his entry for the area in The Buildings of England series and details "scalloped bargeboards [...] and decorative guards to the arched windows". Pevsner and the Historic England official list entry misleadingly record the cottages as late-19th-century rather than mid-19th century.

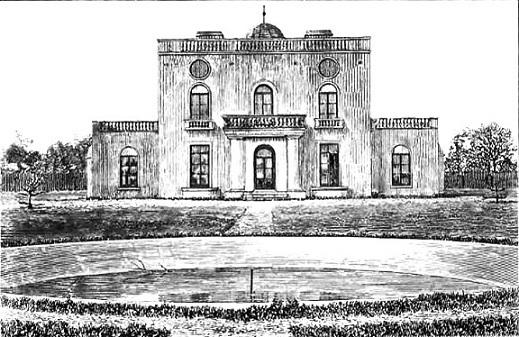
A drawing of Mayne Reid's now-demolished "Rancho"

The land for the cottages was acquired by Victorian novelist Thomas Mayne Reid on 25 February 1865. A freehold record describes that "the said tenements were taken down by Mayne Reid and on the site whereof he commenced erecting certain other tenements not yet completed". The row included a public reading room and accommodation for a police constable. Mayne Reid also built his private residence, The Rancho, in the same area. Mayne Reid was the architect of both buildings and went so far as to supervise the brick-making on site.

The cottages acquired their name when they were sold to Colonel William Le Poer Trench, a keen huntsman who also changed the name of his own mansion from Langley Lodge to St. Hubert's, after the patron saint of hunting. Le Poer Trench was the son of the 3rd Earl of Clancarty, Member of Parliament for Galway in 1872–74 and Justice of the Peace for Buckinghamshire. Prior to this they were known as Bramley Cottages following the purchase of Mayne Reid's property from his creditors following his bankruptcy by John Bramley-Moore (a merchant and politician) in 1867.
