= John Bramley-Moore =

British businessman and politician

John Bramley-Moore (1800 – 19 November 1886) was an English politician and chairman of the Mersey Docks and Harbour Board.

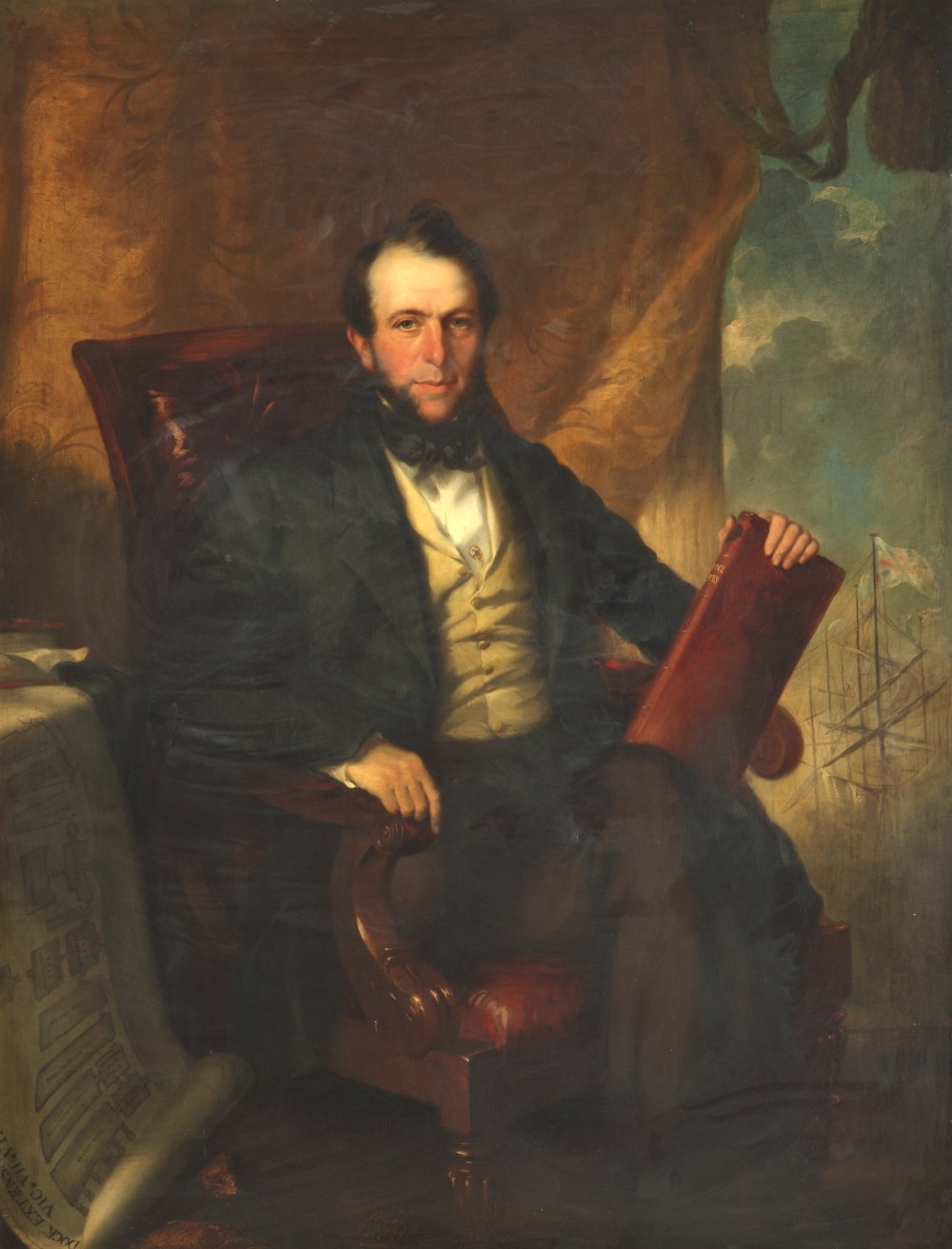
John Bramley-Moore, 1845 portrait

== Life ==
The youngest son of Thomas Moore, he was born in Leeds and assumed his additional name of Bramley in 1841. As a young man, he went out to Brazil to engage in commerce, and lived for several years at Rio de Janeiro, where in 1828 he entertained the officers of the exploring ships HMS Beagle and HMS Adventure. Much of the wealth he acquired in Brazil was derived from slave-worked exports and illicit slave-trading. On his return to England in 1835, he settled in Liverpool as a merchant.

In 1841, Bramley-Moore was elected by the Liverpool town council as an alderman, an office which he held for 24 years. In 1841 he became a member of the dock committee (afterwards called the dock board), and in the following year was appointed chairman. He worked for the 1846 arrangement with the Earl of Derby, by which two miles of the foreshore of the River Mersey, from the borough boundary to Bootle, became available for the construction of docks. After the opening of the Albert Dock by Prince Albert in 1846 he was offered a knighthood, which he declined. Five other docks were opened on 4 August 1848, one of which was named Bramley-Moore Dock.

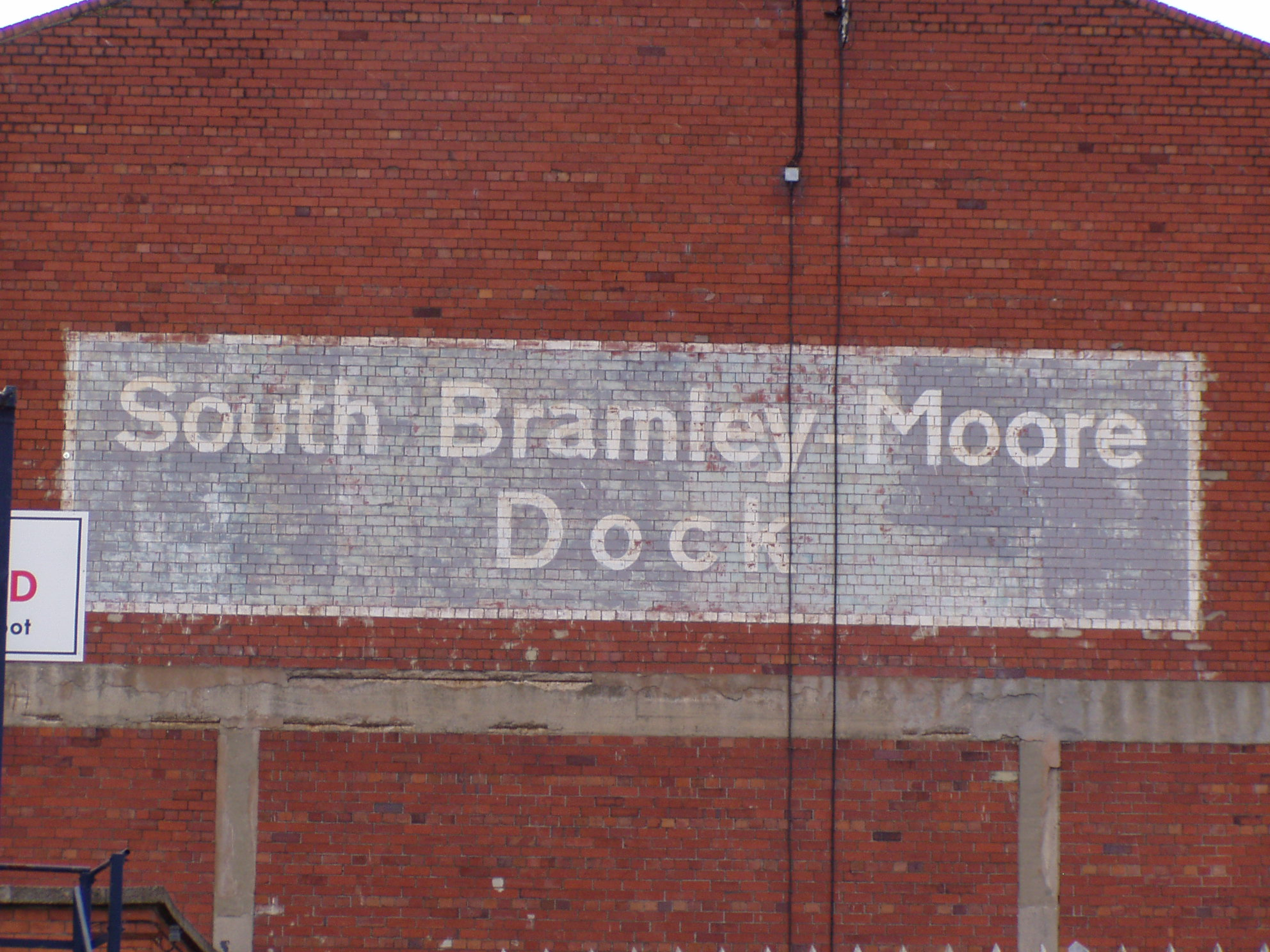
Remaining contemporary sign for South Bramley-Moore Dock

Bramley-Moore was elected Lord Mayor of Liverpool in November 1848, and during his year in office originated a fancy fair and bazaar by which money was raised for the local hospitals. In politics, he was a Conservative, and was returned to Parliament in 1854 as the Member for Maldon. He lost his seat in 1859, but then represented Lincoln from 1862 to 1865. He was an unsuccessful candidate for Kingston upon Hull in 1852, for Liverpool in 1853, and Lymington in 1859.

For many years Bramley-Moore was chairman of the Brazilian chamber of commerce in Liverpool, and lobbied the government to reduce the duties on coffee and sugar. In 1863 he made a speech in parliament on the subject of the relations of England with Brazil, for which he was decorated with the Order of the Rose by the Emperor Pedro II of Brazil.

Some years before his retirement from business Bramley-Moore went to live at Gerrards Cross, Buckinghamshire, where he acquired a row of cottages with a reading-room.

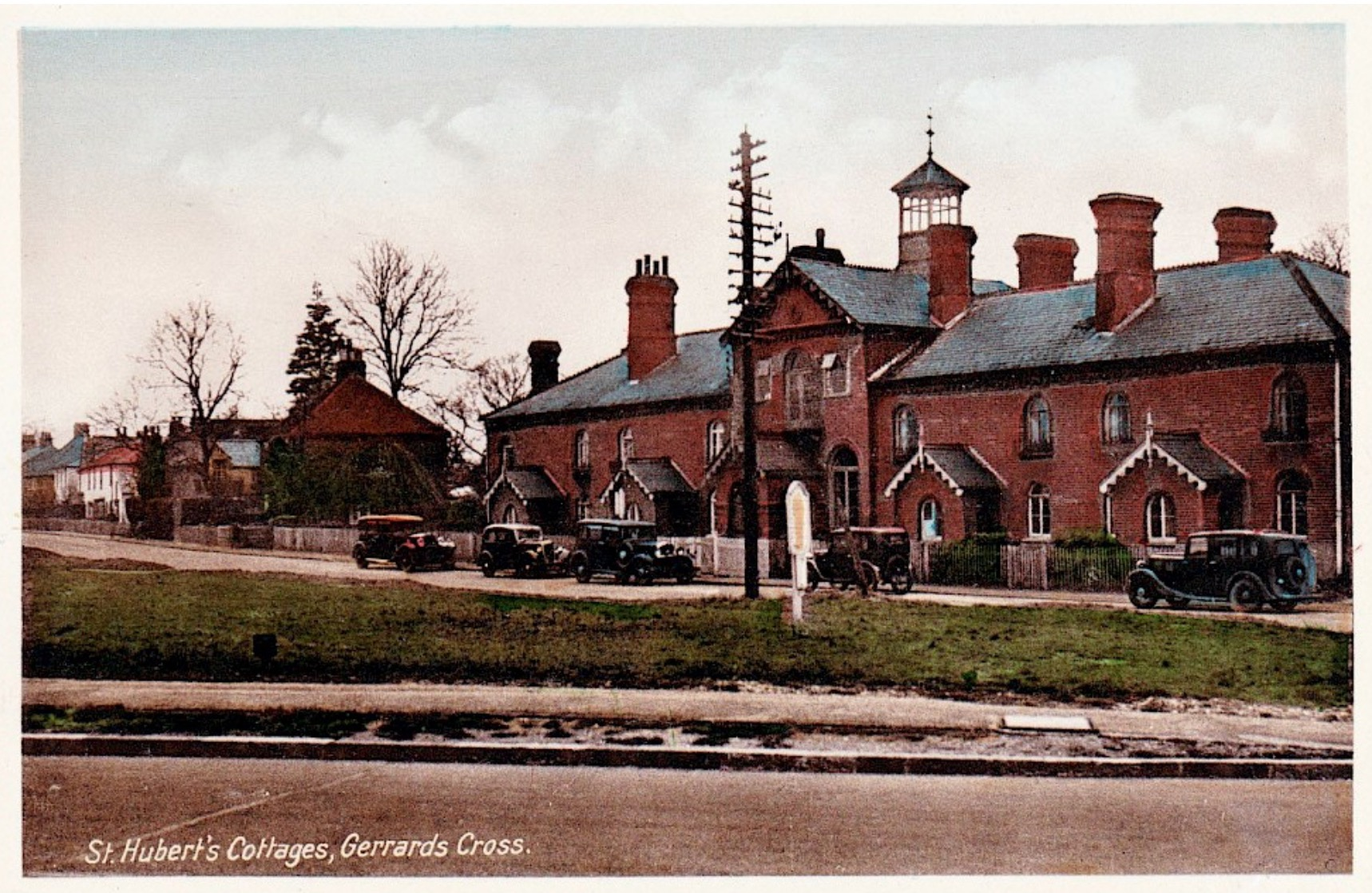
An early C20 postcard depicting St Huberts Cottages with a (now demolished) tower above a central reading room

He died at Brighton on 19 November 1886, aged 86, and was buried at St. Michael's-in-the-Hamlet, Toxteth Park, Liverpool.

== Family ==
Moore married in 1830 Seraphina Hibernia, daughter of William Pennell, British consul-general for Brazil, and left two sons, the Rev. William Joseph Bramley-Moore, a clergyman of the Church of England, and author of theological works, and John Arthur Bramley-Moore (died 10 July 1899).

== Notes ==
Attribution

This article incorporates text from a publication now in the public domain: Lee, Sidney, ed. (1901). "Bramley-Moore, John". Dictionary of National Biography (1st supplement). Vol. 1. London: Smith, Elder & Co.

Parliament of the United Kingdom
Preceded by Taverner John Miller; Charles Du Cane	Member of Parliament for Maldon; 1854–1859; With: George Peacocke to 1857; Thomas Western from 1857	Succeeded by Thomas Western; George Peacocke
Preceded by George Heneage; Charles Seely	Member of Parliament for Lincoln; 1862–1865; With: Charles Seely	Succeeded by Charles Seely; Edward Heneage
