= Joe Blochel =

English footballer

Personal information
- Full name: Jozef Edward Blochel
- Date of birth: 3 March 1962 (age 64)
- Place of birth: Chalfont St Giles, England
- Height: 5 ft 10 in (1.78 m)
- Position: Forward

Senior career*
Years	Team	Apps	(Gls)
1980–1982	Southampton	0	(0)
1982	→ Wimbledon (loan)	6	(1)
1982	IK Arvika		
1982	Road-Sea Southampton		
1984–1985	Karlstad BK		
1985–1987	Wycombe Wanderers		
1987–1989	Bognor Regis Town		
1989–1990	Djerv 1919		
1990	Hertzöga BK		
1990–1991	Säffle FF		
- * Club domestic league appearances and goals

Jozef Edward Blochel (born 3 March 1962) in Chalfont St Giles, Buckinghamshire, is an English retired professional footballer who played briefly as a winger for Wimbledon in the Football League.

Blochel joined Southampton as an associate schoolboy in September 1975, signing as a professional in March 1980, but failed to break into the first-team. He joined Wimbledon on loan in January 1982, before being released by "the Saints".

After a few years in Scandinavia, he returned to England to play lower league football, before settling in Scandinavia.
