= Chalfont St Giles =

Village in Buckinghamshire, England

Coordinates: 51.63°N 0.57°W

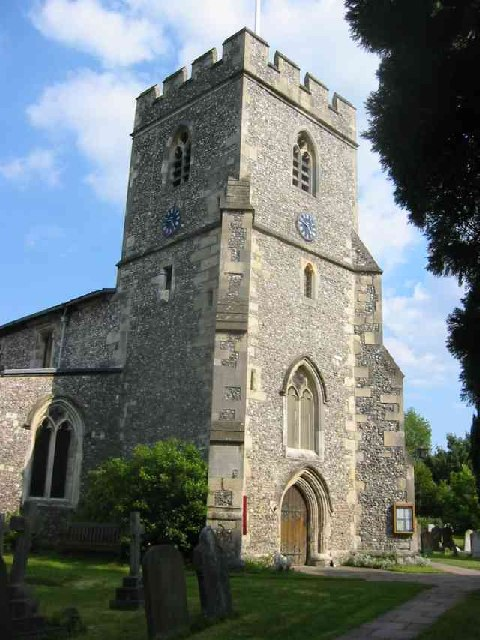
- St Giles' parish church

- Location within Buckinghamshire
- Population: 5,925 (2011 Census)
- OS grid reference: SU9893
- Civil parish: Chalfont St Giles
- Unitary authority: Buckinghamshire
- Ceremonial county: Buckinghamshire
- Region: South East
- Country: England
- Sovereign state: United Kingdom
- Post town: Chalfont St. Giles
- Postcode district: HP8
- Dialling code: 01494
- Police: Thames Valley
- Fire: Buckinghamshire
- Ambulance: South Central
- UK Parliament: Chesham and Amersham
- Website: The Chalfont St Giles village website

Chalfont St Giles is a village and civil parish in southeast Buckinghamshire, England. It is in a group of villages called The Chalfonts, which also includes Chalfont St Peter and Little Chalfont.

It lies on the edge of the Chiltern Hills, 20.9 miles (33.6 km) west-northwest of Charing Cross, central London, and near Seer Green, Jordans, Chalfont St Peter, Little Chalfont and Amersham.

The cockney rhyming slang term "chalfonts", meaning haemorrhoids (piles), is derived from the name of the village. The village has a duck pond that is fed by the River Misbourne. The village sign was designed and painted by Doreen Wilcockson ARCA in 2001. Chalfont St Giles is famous for the poet Milton’s only surviving home.

== History ==
In the Domesday Book of 1086, Chalfont St Giles and Chalfont St Peter were listed as separate Manors with different owners, called 'Celfunte', which is likely derived from "cealc funta" - the Old English for chalk stream. They were separate holdings before the Norman Conquest.

The Church of England parish church of Saint Giles is of Norman architecture and dates from the 12th century. The church features a lychgate and wall paintings from the early 14th century. During the English Civil War, some iron cannonballs were embedded in the stonework around the east window; they were believed to have been fired by Oliver Cromwell's troops when camped in the neighbouring field after the Battle of Aylesbury. Three of these balls are now on display in John Milton's Cottage in the village. Bishop Francis Hare is buried in his family mausoleum in the churchyard.

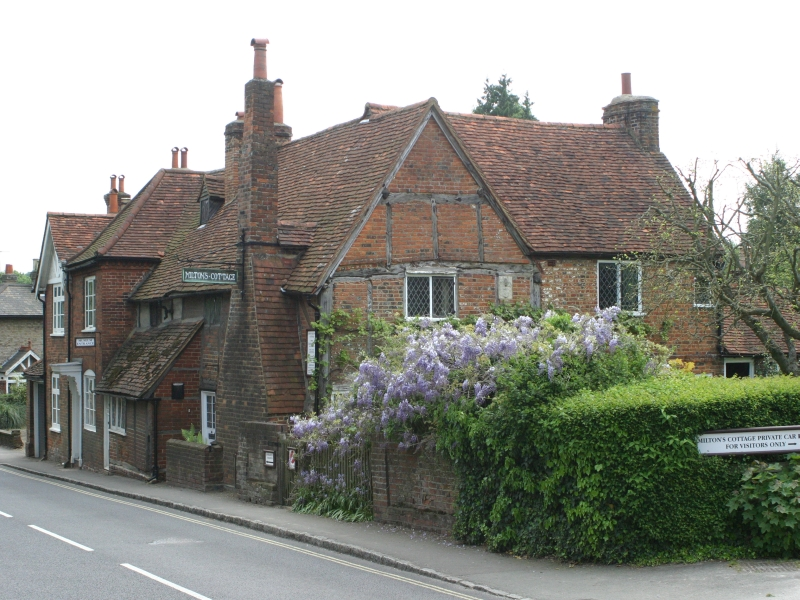
Milton's Cottage, at 1 Deanway, Chalfont St Giles

During the Great Plague of London in 1665, John Milton retired to Chalfont St Giles where he completed his epic poem Paradise Lost. Milton's Cottage still stands in the village, and is open to the public. The inspiration for Paradise Regained is said to have been found in this parish from a conversation with a former pupil, Thomas Ellwood. In 1887, after an attempt was made to relocate the house to America and rebuild it there, a movement was begun locally to purchase the house by local public subscription. Queen Victoria headed the list with a gift of £20, a considerable amount at the time – approximately £2,360 as of 2016.

Like most other rural parishes, it managed its civil affairs through the vestry until the Local Government Act 1894 required all parishes of over 300 people to have a Parish council independent of the Church. The village was the birthplace of cricketer J. T. Hearne, one of the greatest bowlers of the 1890s and 1900s, who died there in 1944, and of the actress Alexandra Gilbreath.

Notable residents of the village have included Ozzy Osbourne, Harry Golombek, Brian Connolly, Brian Cant, Chicane, Armando Iannucci, Noel Gallagher, and Nick Clegg who became the Liberal Democrats party leader in 2007 and Deputy Prime Minister of the United Kingdom from 2010 to 2015.

The village has given its name to Chalfont, Pennsylvania, which is a borough in Bucks County, Pennsylvania.

The Chiltern Open Air Museum, located immediately outside the parish boundary, rescues and re-erects historic buildings which face demolition, from medieval to modern. Its collection includes a cottage from around 1600, and a variety of 19th century buildings, within 45 acres (18 ha) of parkland.

The Buckinghamshire Building Society was founded in 1907 as the Chalfont & District Permanent Building Society, and it continues to have its headquarters and sole branch in the village.

== Future ==
High Speed 2 will pass underneath the village in the Chiltern tunnel. A ventilation shaft will be constructed near the village, disguised as a barn.

== Amenities ==
The village is the closest to Hodgemoor Wood, a Site of Special Scientific Interest.

The village is twinned with Graft-De Rijp, Netherlands.

=== Education ===
Chalfont St Giles Village School educates children from the ages of 3 to 7 (at an infant school and nursery) and 7 to 11 (at the junior school).

=== Sport ===
The local football club is Chalfont Wasps, which was promoted to the Hellenic Football League Premier Division for the 2008–09 season. They play their home games at 'The Nest'. Chalfont St Giles has a tennis club, affiliated to the Lawn Tennis Association. The village is home to Oakland Park Golf Club, and nearby to Harewood Downs Golf Club.

The local cricket club is Chalfont St Giles CC, which plays in the Thames Valley Cricket League and Morrant Chiltern League. They play their home games at Bowstridge Lane in the heart of the village.

== Film and television ==
Chalfont St Giles has been the location of several film and television programmes. It doubled as Walmington-on-Sea in the 1971 film version of Dad's Army. John Laurie, one of the main actors, lived in Chalfont St Peter. The Miller's Tale episode of the BBC Television drama The Canterbury Tales was filmed in and around Chalfont St Giles as was an episode of the BBC Television sitcom As Time Goes By. It was the location for the filming of Episode 6 of Series 3 of Peep Show. A series 2 episode of the Channel 5 series No Place Like Home was predominantly filmed in Chalfont St Giles, with Fern Britton, a former resident, touring viewers around the village. The village hosted a 2015 episode of Storage Hunters UK.

The village is also mentioned in the series 3 episode of Jeeves and Wooster entitled "Bertie Sets Sail", when Bertie Wooster likens Lord Wilmot Pershaw's demeanour to "a wet weekend in Chalfont St. Giles". Other films and TV shows filmed in Chalfont St Giles include Hammer House of Horror, The Sweeney, and The Big Job (1965), starring Sid James and Dick Emery. The village is ideal for film production due to its close proximity to Pinewood Studios in Iver Heath, and London.

The Chalfont St Giles Community Library has featured twice on BBC's The One Show; first in 2010 and for a second time in 2012. The segments highlighted the importance of the library to the community and how volunteers have helped keep it operational.

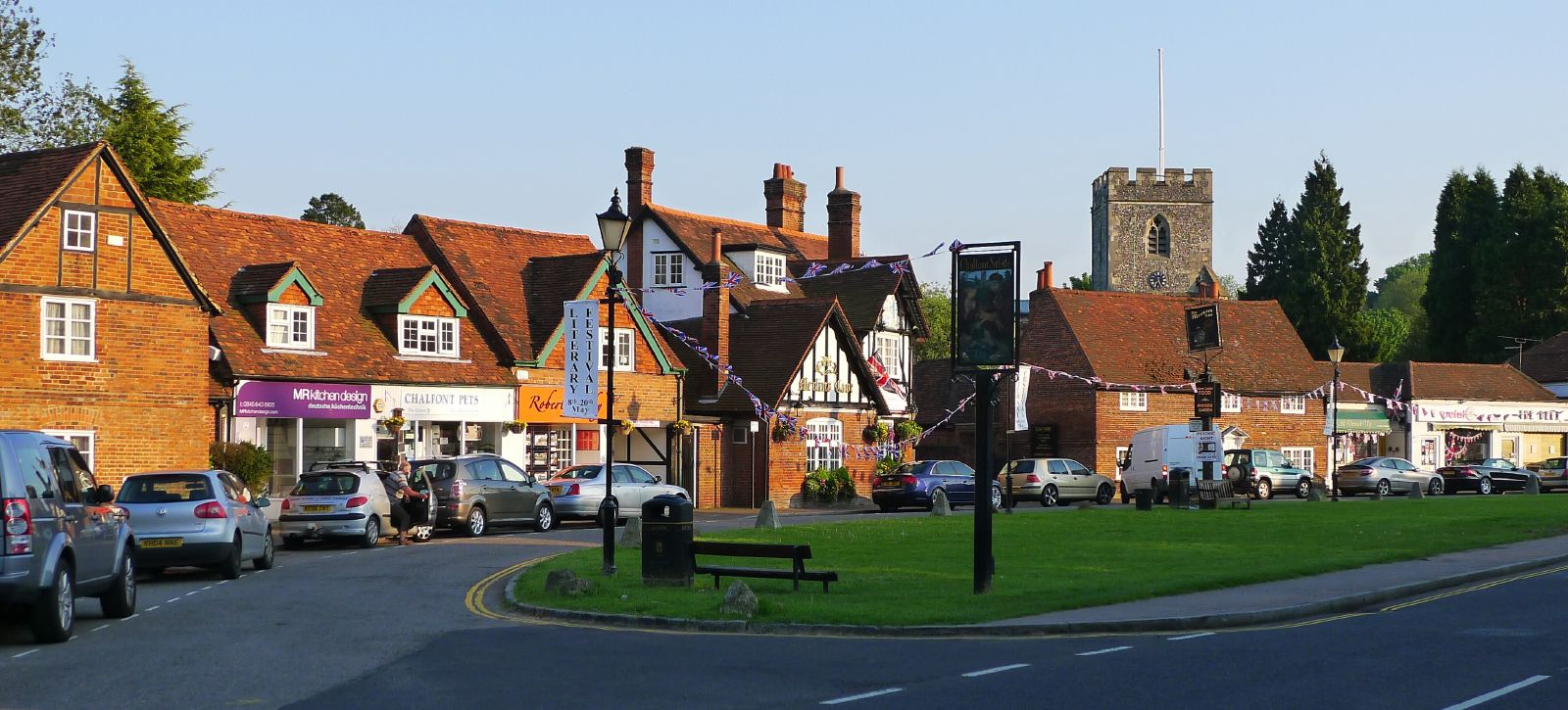

== Events ==
=== Chalfont St Giles Village Show ===
The Chalfont St Giles Village Show is an annual event that normally occurs on the first Saturday of September. The show hosts entertainment attractions, stalls from local people and businesses, and a horticultural and arts-and-craft competition for local residents to enter(with a maximum prize of £3).

=== Other Events ===
Chalfont St Giles has hosted numerous Beer Festivals that take place on the village green, with the most notable being in 2014 when DJ Brandon Block hosted a set.

In May 2023, Chalfont St Giles hosted a street party to celebrate the Coronation of King Charles III. The event hosted thousands of people, with live music, barbeques, pop-up bars, rides, and face painting. The event was attended by Princess Beatrice and Princess Eugenie.

== Hamlets ==
Hamlets in Chalfont St Giles parish include:

- Bottrells Close, located along Bottrells Lane to the west of the village. Bottrells Close Cottage is the location of the ancient hamlet.
- Chalfont Grove, located to the south of the village along Narcot Lane. It is the location of the British Forces Broadcasting Service.
- Jordans, located south west of the main village, near Seer Green.
- Stratton Chase, located to the north of Mill Lane.

== Notable people ==
- Chicane (Nick Bracegirdle, born 1971), influential musician and producer
- Joe Blochel (born 1962), retired professional footballer
- Fern Britton (born 1967), TV presenter and author
- Brian Cant (1933–2017), children's television presenter and actor
- Brian Connolly (1945–1997), lead singer of the glam rock band Sweet
- Sir Thomas Clayton (1612-1693), Regius Professor of Medicine at Oxford and MP for Oxford University
- Nick Clegg (born 1967), media executive and former Deputy Prime Minister
- Noel Gallagher (born 1967), musician, songwriter, and former lead guitarist of the rock band Oasis
- Sir George Fleetwood (1564-1620), Member of Parliament for Wycombe and Tavistock
- George Fleetwood (1623-1672), soldier and regicide who co-signed King Charles I’s death warrant. Son of Sir George Fleetwood (above)
- James Fleetwood (1603-1683), English clergyman and Bishop of Worcester
- Thomas Fleetwood (1517/18-1570), Member of Parliament and Master of the Royal Mint under King Henry VIII
- Harry Golombek (1911-1995), chess Grandmaster, author, and chess correspondent
- J. T. Hearne (1867-1944), Middlesex and England medium-fast bowler. His 3,061 first-class wickets remain a record for medium-pace bowlers
- Armando Iannucci (born 1963), acclaimed Scottish satirist, writer, and director
- Penny Jamieson (born 1942), the seventh Bishop of Dunedin and the world’s second woman diocesan bishop
- Charles Key (1883-1964), British schoolmaster and Labour Party politician
- John Milton (1608–1674), renowned poet and intellectual, known for his epic poem "Paradise Lost"
- Francis Hare (1671-1740), Bishop of St Asaph and later Chichester, classical scholar
- Admiral Sir Hugh Palliser (1723-1796), Royal Navy officer and colonial governor, known for his role in the Seven Years’ War. Former owner of The Vache estate in the village
- Liam Payne (1993–2024), singer-songwriter and member of the boy band One Direction
- Gavin Sherlock (born 1969), professor of Genetics at Stanford University
- John Williams (1903-1983), actor known for his role as Chief Inspector Hubbard in Dial M for Murder
