= Chalfont Common =

Hamlet in Buckinghamshire, England

Coordinates: 51.6180°N 0.5497°W

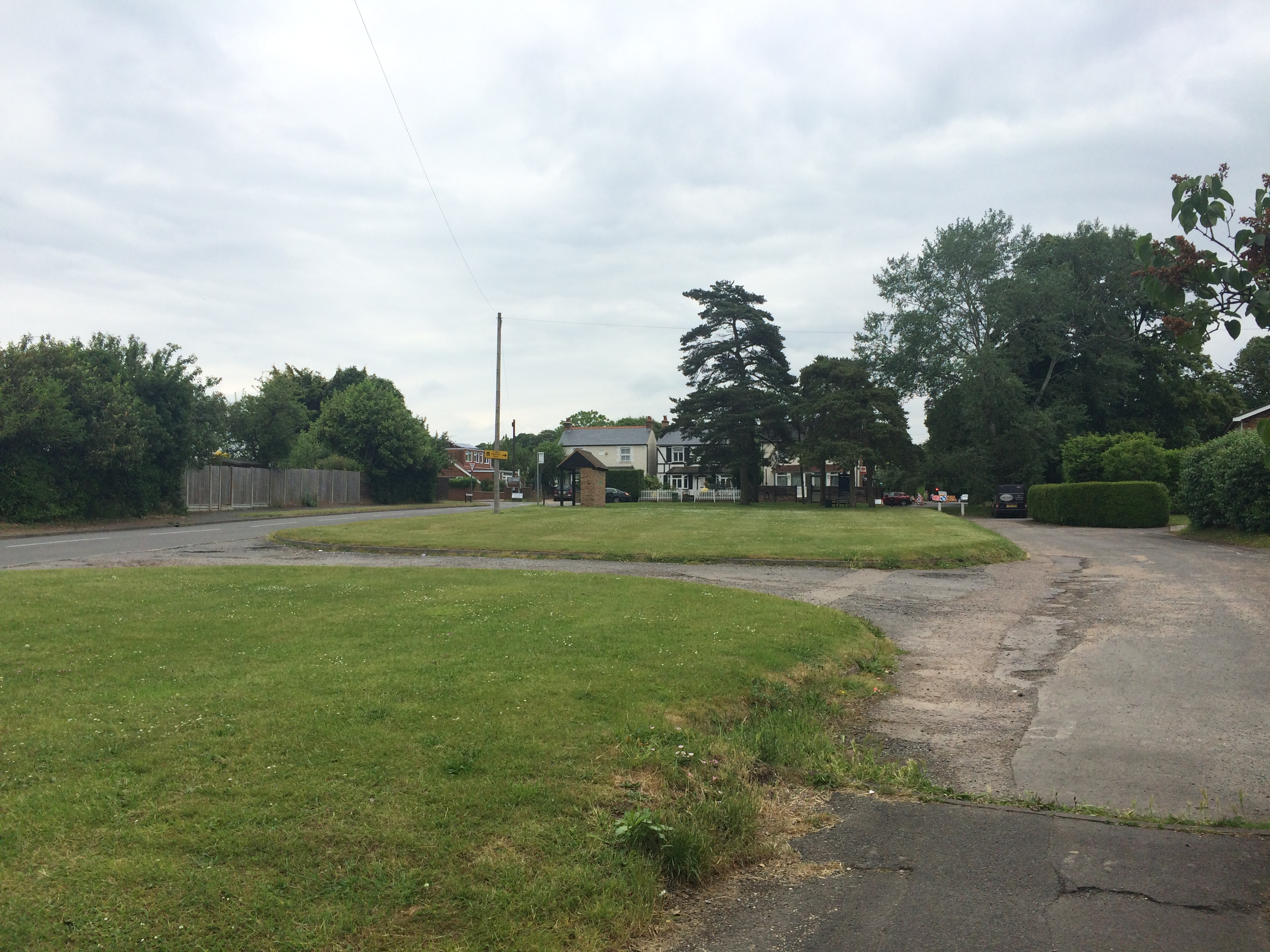
- Chalfont Common in 2015

- Location within Buckinghamshire
- Population: 3,814
- OS grid reference: TQ 00506 92015
- Civil parish: Chalfont St. Peter
- Unitary authority: Buckinghamshire
- Ceremonial county: Buckinghamshire
- Region: South East
- Country: England
- Sovereign state: United Kingdom
- Post town: Gerrards Cross
- Postcode district: SL9
- Dialling code: 01753/01494
- Police: Thames Valley
- Fire: Buckinghamshire
- Ambulance: South Central
- UK Parliament: Chesham and Amersham

Chalfont Common is a hamlet in the parish of Chalfont St Peter, Buckinghamshire, England. It is located in the Chiltern Hills, approximately one mile to the north east of Chalfont St Peter village centre. Chalfont Common is 19.7 miles (31.7 km) west-north-west of Charing Cross, central London.

It is located east of the River Misbourne and was one of Chalfont St Peter's three commons (the other two being Gold Hill Common and Austenwood Common). Housing of all sorts developed around and on the common, some dating back to the 1890s. In the 1960s a post office was constructed on the common, which has since closed.

It is also the home of the Epilepsy Society which was founded in 1892.

== Gott's Monument ==
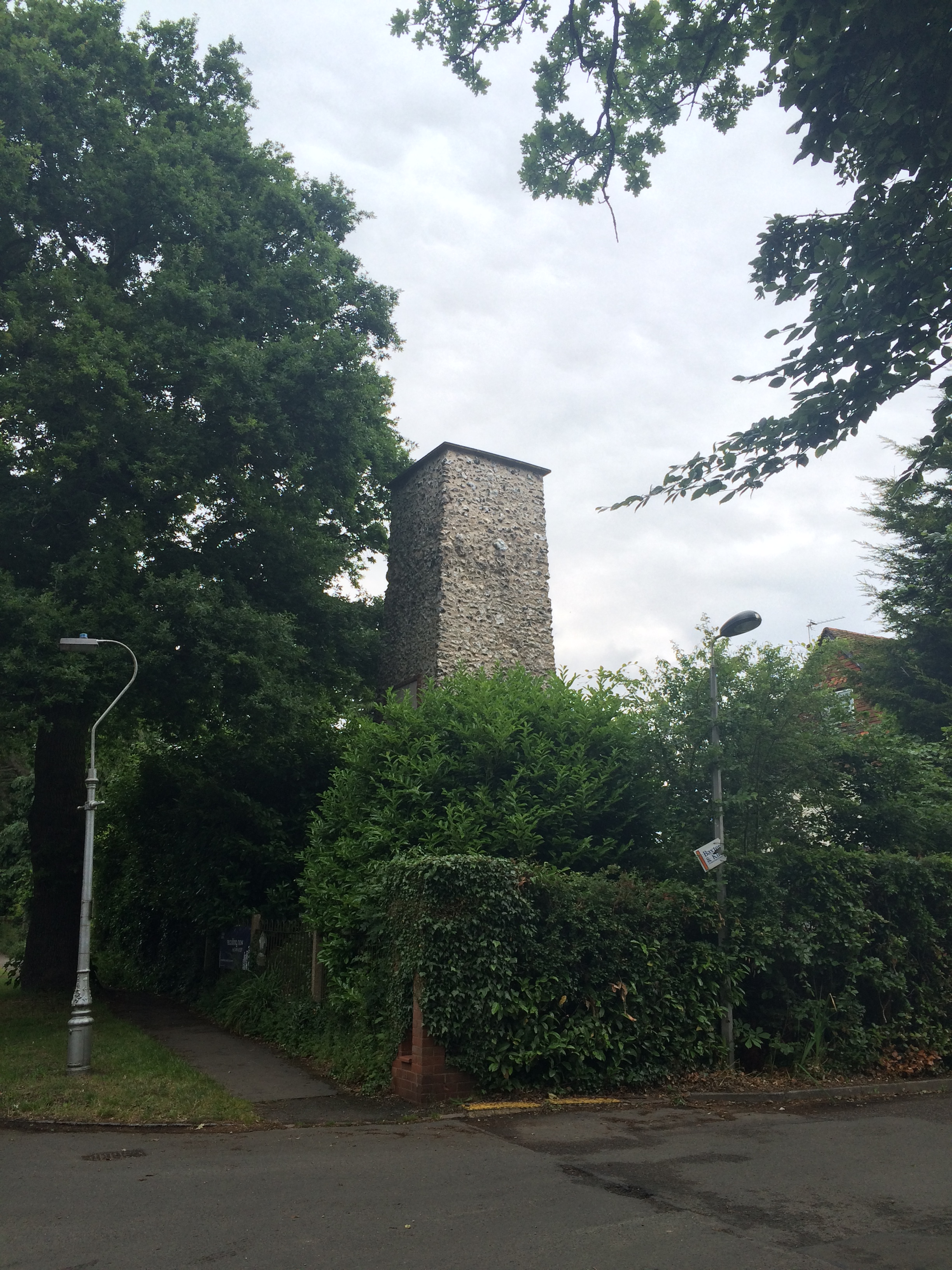
Gott's Monument in June 2015.

Chalfont Common is also the home of Gott's Monument which was erected in 1785 by Sir H T Gott. According to local tradition, the monument either commemorates a hunt attended by George III, or an incident in which the king got lost in the forest surrounding the monument.

The plaque on the obelisk, which is the height of horseback, reads:

1785
To NEWLAND I Mile III Furl.g's
To Chesham VII Miles
Built by Sir H T Gott
Restored by W Brown in 1879
To Denham IV Miles
To Uxbridge VI Miles
LONDON XXI

The monument was damaged in 1879 by a lightning strike and was rebuilt. Remarkably it was struck by lightning again in the 1960s, so was reduced from its original size of 60 ft to 20 ft.

The monument has been Grade II listed since 22 December 1958.
