= Gerrards Cross Memorial Building =

Memorial in Buckinghamshire, England

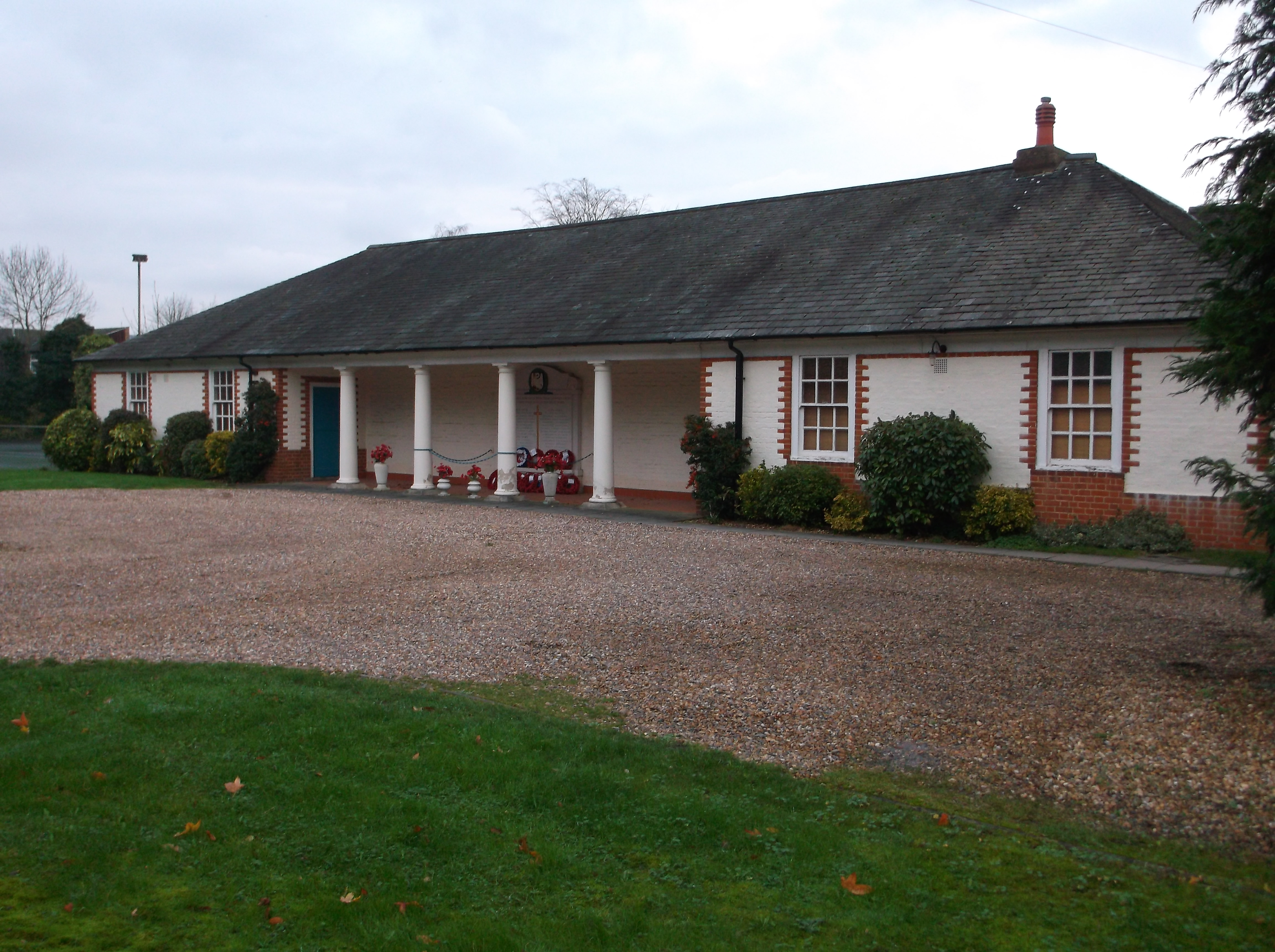
- The memorial building photographed in late 2015
- Interactive map of the Gerrards Cross Memorial Building area

General information
- Type: Community centre; war memorial
- Location: East Common, Gerrards Cross, Buckinghamshire, England
- Coordinates: 51.583576°N 0.551712°W

Technical details
- Material: Red brick

Design and construction
- Designations: Grade II listed
- Memorial
- Gerrards Cross Community Association
- For those from Gerrards Cross who gave their lives in the Great Wars
- Unveiled: 14 October 1922
- Designed by: Sir Edwin Lutyens
- Commemorated: 35
- IN HONOURED MEMORY OF THOSE FROM GERRARDS CROSS WHO GAVE THEIR LIVES IN THE GREAT WARS 1914–1918 1939–1945 THEIR NAME LIVETH FOR EVERMORE

The Gerrards Cross Memorial Building is a community centre and First World War memorial in the village of Gerrards Cross in Buckinghamshire, to north west of London, England. The building was designed by British architect Sir Edwin Lutyens, known for designing the Cenotaph in London and numerous other war memorials; it is the only instance of Lutyens designing a war memorial with a functional purpose, rather than as a monument in its own right.

== Conception ==
In the aftermath of the First World War, thousands of war memorials were commissioned across Britain to commemorate the war dead. In Gerrards Cross, the local vicar, the Reverend John Matthew Glubb, was keen to have a "living memorial" which would be of use to the village community and its ex-service personnel, rather than simply a monument in its own right. The vicar proposed that the former vicarage stables should be converted for use as a community centre. Rather than form a war memorial committee as was the common practice, the village established a community association, whose remit was to "establish, maintain and manage a community centre which shall be a war memorial for activities promoted by the association and its constituent members in furtherance of the above objectives or any of them, the centre to be called the Gerrards Cross Centre".

== Design ==
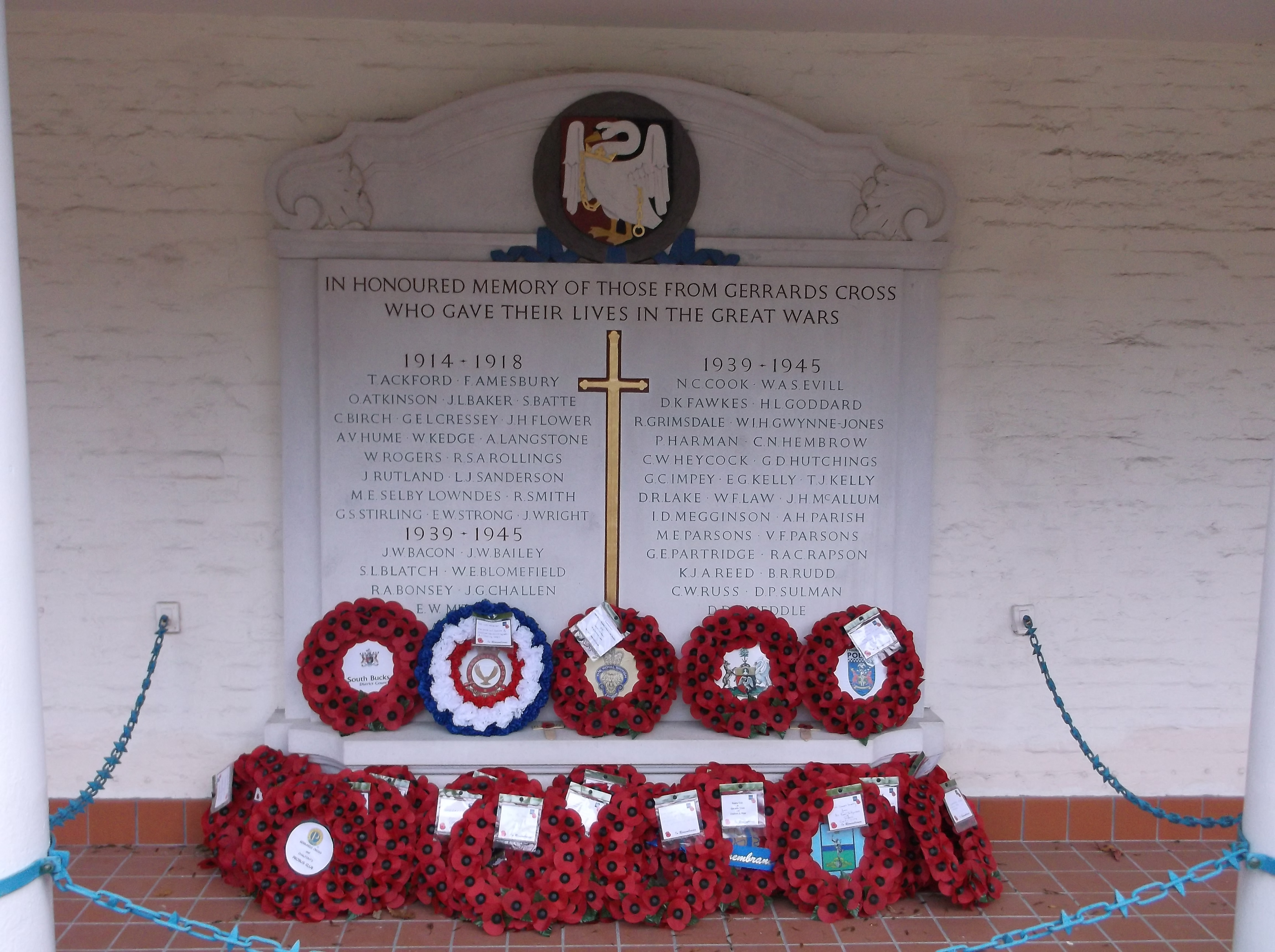
The memorial plaque in the portico listing the names of the fallen from Gerrards Cross

Architect Sir Edwin Lutyens was commissioned for the project. Although Lutyens designed over 40 war memorials in the aftermath of the First World War, Gerrards Cross was the only in which he was commissioned to design a memorial with a functional purpose. Lutyens was already a well-regarded architect for his country houses built for wealthy clients before the war, and was commissioned to design many war memorials following the success of the Cenotaph on London's Whitehall. The building is based on the 18th-century vicarage stables. Set well back from the road and partially hidden by hedges, it is a rectangular structure constructed predominantly of red brick, most of which is painted white, with a slate roof and a large portico in antis. The roof above the portico is supported by four sandstone Doric columns, also painted white, which are level with the walls of the wings; it houses a stone memorial plaque the height of the wall which lists the names of men from the village who were killed while serving in the First World War. The interior is based around a central hall with wings to the side, forming a U shape; the wings are accessed from the exterior through doors at either end of the portico. Viewed from the front, the building appears to be a single-storey structure, but at the rear the roof is shorter, revealing an attic storey above the hall.

Lutyens' original proposal included a similar portico at the rear of the building to allow for a larger hall, but this was not included in the final specification. The total cost of the project was approximately £3,500 (1922) (about £172,000 in 2025), which was funded by public subscription. The building was formally opened by Charles Wynn-Carington, 1st Marquess of Lincolnshire, the Lord Lieutenant of Buckinghamshire, on 14 October 1922.

== Post-war history ==
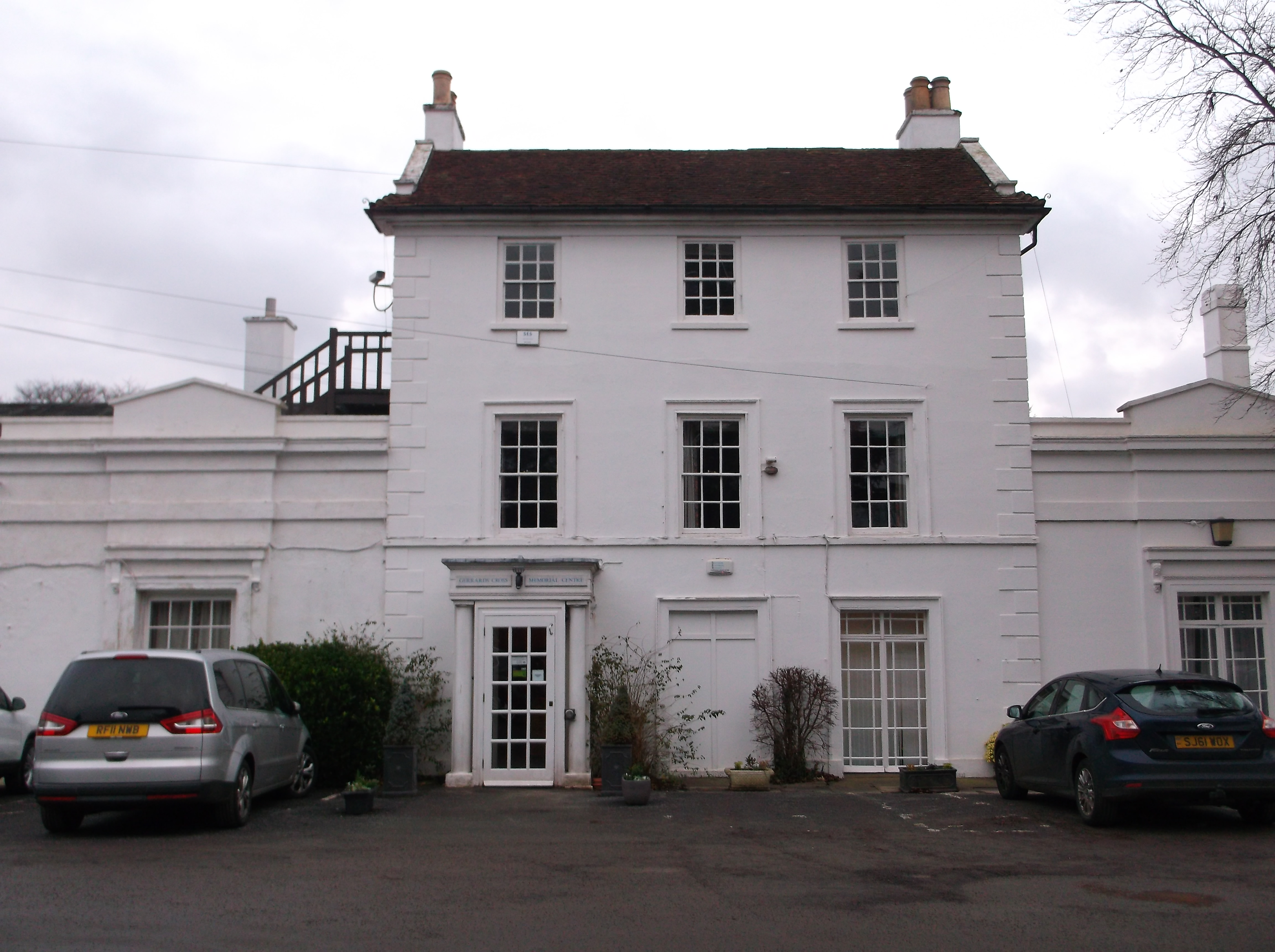
The Gerrards Cross Memorial Centre, formerly the vicarage but converted into a memorial to the Second World War

The plaque on the front of the building was replaced in 1947, the replacement having been sculpted by Edmund Ware. The plaque contains two columns of names separated by a sword and headed by the pre-1948 coat of arms of Buckinghamshire. In the same year, the Gerrards Cross Community Association was founded to promote the well-being of the village community and took responsibility for the memorial building. The vicarage house itself (formerly known as Berkeley Cottage and heavily modified since its original construction), just east of the memorial building—adjacent and to the rear—was purchased from the Church of England after the Second World War and converted into the Gerrards Cross Memorial Centre to serve as a memorial to the second war.

To commemorate Remembrance Sunday 2015, Historic England (formerly known as English Heritage) announced that it considered Lutyens' war memorials to be a national collection. Accordingly, the Gerrards Cross Memorial Building was designated a grade II listed building, having previously been the only one of Lutyens' 44 free-standing memorials in England not to hold listed building status. Each of the memorials' descriptions on the National Heritage List for England was also updated and expanded. The adjacent Memorial Centre is a grade II listed building in its own right, having been listed in 1985.

The memorial building remains in active use, and serves as the headquarters of the local branch of the Royal British Legion.
