= Chalfonts Community College =

Academy in Buckinghamshire, England

Location
- Narcot Lane; Chalfont St Peter, Buckinghamshire; England; 51.609542°N 0.570184°W

Information
- Type: Academy
- Motto: Success is an attitude
- Specialist: Technology College and Training School
- Department for Education URN: 137215 Tables
- Ofsted: Reports
- Principal: Caroline Whitehead
- Staff: 161
- Gender: Co-educational
- Age: 11 to 18
- Enrolment: 1,481
- Houses: None
- Colour: Blue
- Website: www.chalfonts.org

Chalfonts Community College is a co-educational secondary school in Chalfont St Peter, Buckinghamshire. It takes children from the age of 11 through to 18 and has approximately 1,481 pupils. In August 2011 the school became an Academy.

== About ==
In September 2002 the Department for Education and Skills (DfES) awarded the school specialist school status as a Technology College. The college was also awarded a second specialism, and also had Training School Status.

In 2008 it was reported that the school was paying sixth form students to teach younger pupils at the school, instead of employing qualified supply teachers whose quality of teaching the school had sometimes felt to be lacking. Twenty-four students were being paid £5 for fifty minutes of teaching a subject, which they were studying at A-level. The students were given training and were accompanied by an adult in the classroom.

== Creative and Media Diploma and Engineering Diploma ==
In 2008, the Chalfonts Community College began to road test the edexcel engineering diploma.

The school was one of two that taught the diploma, and the current year eleven students are still completing the course. The Creative and Media Diploma was successfully launched in September 2009.

== Ofsted ==
The school was rated "Good" by Ofsted in both November 2013, May 2017 and February 2023.

== Notable former pupils ==
- Mark McGuinness – Footballer currently playing for Sheffield United.
- Lydia Alty – Royal Journalist and YouTuber, who covers the British Royal Family attended to school from 2016 to 2023.
