= Milton's Cottage =

Grade I listed historic house museum in Chiltern, United Kingdom

Coordinates: 51.630442°N 0.572716°W

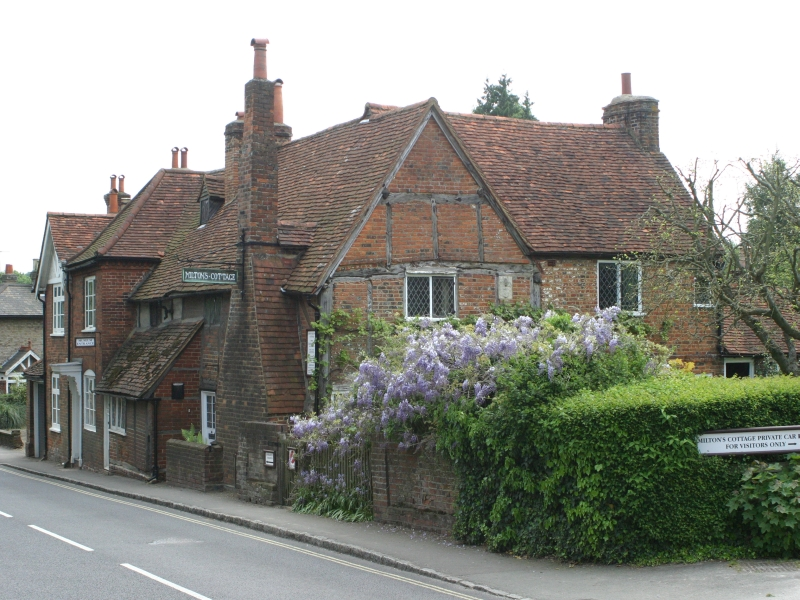
Milton's Cottage

Milton's Cottage is a timber-framed 16th-century building in the Buckinghamshire village of Chalfont St Giles. It was the former home of writer John Milton, and is open to the public as a writer's house museum.

== Overview ==
In 1665 Milton and his wife moved into the cottage to escape the Plague in London. Despite Milton's having spent less than a year at the cottage, it is important because of its being his only extant residence. While at the Grade I listed 16th-century cottage, Milton completed his best known work, Paradise Lost; the seeds for Paradise Regained were also sown here. Milton's friend Thomas Ellwood called the cottage "that pretty box in St. Giles".

The ground floor of the cottage is now a museum dedicated to Milton and his works. The four museum rooms contain the most extensive collection in the world on open display of 17th-century first editions of John Milton's works, both poetry and prose. Tours vividly describe and explore the extraordinary career of this blind genius in his refuge from the plague, where he wrote some of the finest poetry.

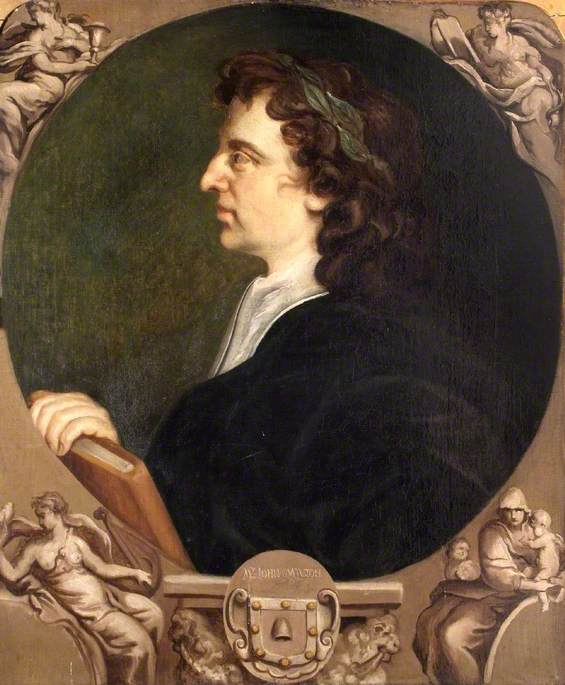
A painting of John Milton held at Milton's Cottage

The cottage's garden is also open to the public and is planted in a traditional style.

== Royal interest ==
In 1887, after an attempt was made to move the house to America and rebuild it there, a movement was begun locally to purchase the house by local public subscription. Queen Victoria opened the subscription list for the purchase of the Cottage in 1887. The Cottage and garden have been visited by Elizabeth II, Queen Elizabeth The Queen Mother, Princess Margaret, Countess of Snowdon, and Prince Richard, Duke of Gloucester, on separate occasions. To celebrate the quatercentenary of Milton's birth in 2008, Charles, Prince of Wales, and Camilla, Duchess of Cornwall, also visited.
