= Gavin Sherlock =

American geneticist

Gavin Sherlock is an English-American professor of genetics at Stanford University.

== Research ==
Sherlock obtained a Bachelor of Science degree in genetics in 1991 from the University of Manchester, where he also earned a Ph.D. in molecular biology three years later.

Sherlock was involved with the Stanford Microarray Database, an early attempt to organize the extensive data generated by DNA microarray analysis. In 2012, Sherlock, along with Barbara Dunn and Daniel Kvitek, published a study of the influence of yeast on the flavor of wine during fermentation.
