= Chalfont St Peter =

Village and civil parish in Buckinghamshire, England

Coordinates: 51.607°N 0.556°W

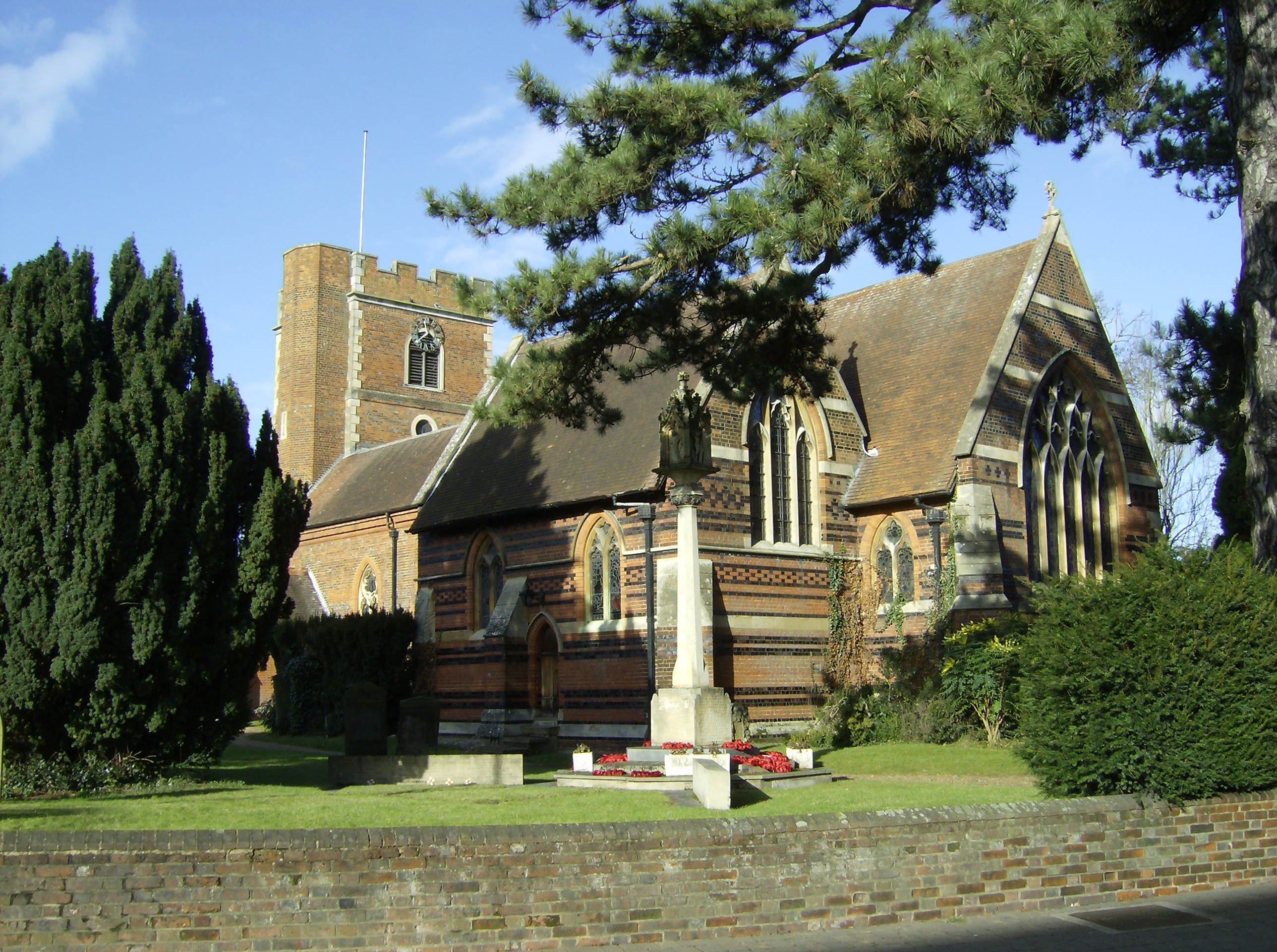
- St. Peter's parish church

- Location within Buckinghamshire
- Area: 6.22 sq mi (16.1 km^{2})
- Population: 12,766
  - Density: 2,052/sq mi (792/km^{2})
- OS grid reference: TQ00059081
- Civil parish: Chalfont St. Peter
- Unitary authority: Buckinghamshire
- Ceremonial county: Buckinghamshire
- Region: South East
- Country: England
- Sovereign state: United Kingdom
- Post town: GERRARDS CROSS
- Postcode district: SL9
- Dialling code: 01753, 01494
- Police: Thames Valley
- Fire: Buckinghamshire
- Ambulance: South Central
- UK Parliament: Chesham and Amersham
- Website: Chalfont St Peter

Chalfont St Peter is a large village and civil parish in southeastern Buckinghamshire, England. It is in a group of villages called The Chalfonts which also includes Chalfont St Giles and Little Chalfont. The villages lie between High Wycombe and Rickmansworth. Chalfont St Peter is one of the largest villages, with nearly 13,000 residents. The urban population for Chalfont St Peter and Gerrards Cross is 19,622, the two places being considered a single area by the Office for National Statistics.

Gerrards Cross was once a hamlet in the parish of Chalfont St Peter, but became a village and civil parish in its own right.

Chalfont St Peter is 19.8 miles (31.9 km) west-north-west of Charing Cross, central London and is also in close proximity to Heathrow Airport, Pinewood and Elstree film studios, and the motorway network (M25, and M40).

== History ==
=== Early history ===
At the time of the Anglo-Saxon Chronicle in 949 there was no distinction made between the three separate villages: the whole area was known as Ceadeles funtan, meaning chalk springs. The villages were however separated by 1237 when in manorial rolls Chalfont St Peter was referred to as Chalfund Sancti Petri. The suffix St Peter is taken from the dedication of the church in the village. Chalfont St Peter was described in 1806 in Magna Britannia as follows:

"Chalfont St Peter, in the hundred and deanery of Burnham, lies about five miles from Amersham, on the road to London, and nearly six miles from Uxbridge in Middlesex. The manor, which belonged to Missenden Abbey, was granted in 1536 to Robert Drury, esquire, whose descendants sold it in 1626 to the Bulstrodes: in 1646 it was conveyed to Thomas Gower esq. of whom, in 1650, it was purchased by Mr. Richard Whitchurch, ancestor of Mrs. Anne Whitchurch, the present proprietor.

"An ancient manor in this parish takes its name from the family of Brudenell, (collateral ancestors of the Earl of Cardigan), who formerly possessed it; from them it descended by female heirs to the Drurys and Osbornes. It afterwards came into the Duke of Portland's family, of whom it was purchased by Charles Churchill esq. the late proprietor; it is now the property of Thomas Hibbert esq. Mr. Hibbert's seat, which is called Chalfont-house, was a distinct property; and before it came into Mr. Churchill's hands, was in the families of Wilkins and Selman.
"Newlands, in this parish, the seat of Sir Henry Thomas Gott, was purchased by its present possessor about the year 1770, of Mr. Croke of Beaconsfield: it had been formerly in the family of Saunders, and was sold by Sir John Saunders to Mr. Hopkins, of whom it was purchased by Mr. Croke.

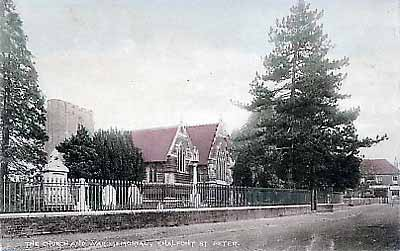
An old photo of Chalfont St Peter Church of England Church

"In the church are memorials for the family of Whitchurch. The advowson and impropriation which belonged formerly to Missenden abbey, and afterwards to the Drurys, was given by Sir Thomas Allen to the president and scholars of St. John's college in Oxford, who present the vicar and grant him a lease of the great tithes.
"The Earl of Portland built a school at Gerrard's Cross, in this parish, adjoining the road from London to High Wycombe. It has no endowment, but has always been supported by the Portland family: the duke appoints the master, and allows him a salary for teaching a number of boys of this and some of the neighbouring parishes.
"William Courtnay, who died in 1770, gave a loaf of bread weekly to each of eleven unmarried poor women of this parish, and one to the clerk."

=== Modern history ===
Today, Chalfont St Peter is one of the largest villages in the United Kingdom partly due to the proximity to Gerrards Cross railway station which lies between London Marylebone and Birmingham Snow Hill on the Chiltern Main Line. Modern buildings and urbanisation now dominate the village centre and very little historic architecture remains. The first major development of the village were rows of Georgian shops (some of which still remain). Much larger developments came in the late 1920s and these shops that run up the main street towards Gold Hill common now comprise most of the village centre. Modernisation and urbanisation continued up until the 1960s when most of the Georgian shops were demolished in favour of a concrete development of flats, offices and shops fronts surrounding a central car park.

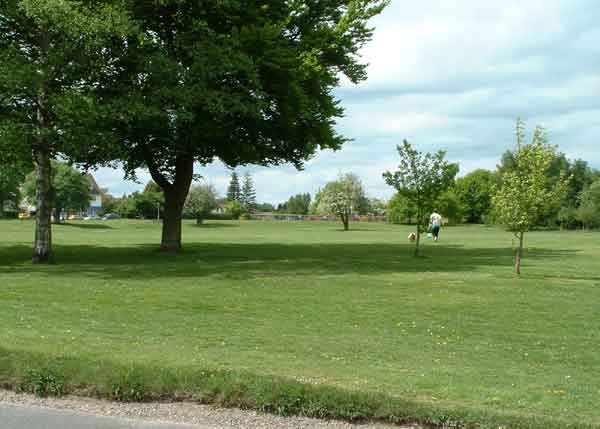
Gold Hill Common

== Population ==
Since the building of Gerrards Cross railway station in the late 19th century, the population of Chalfont St Peter has risen dramatically. From 1801 to 1901, the populations of the village only saw a 700-person rise – giving a population of 1700. But from 1901 to the present, it has become one of the largest villages in the United Kingdom, with nearly 13,000 inhabitants.

== Tourist attractions ==
Chalfont St Peter is often described as the Gateway to the Chiltern Hills. It is not a major tourist centre but has many places to stay, the most notable being The Greyhound, which is situated at the foot of the village on the banks of the River Misbourne. Nearby there are several manor houses of note, as well as many museums, cottages and parks. Milton's Cottage in Chalfont St Giles, the Colne Valley regional park, Bekonscot Model Village, Chenies Manor House, the Chiltern Open Air Museum, Odds Farm Park, Cliveden, Dorney Court, Harrow Museum & Heritage Centre, Royal Windsor Racecourse and Hughenden Manor are the nearest attractions to the village itself. The Chiltern Open Air Museum is situated mainly within the village.

== Education ==
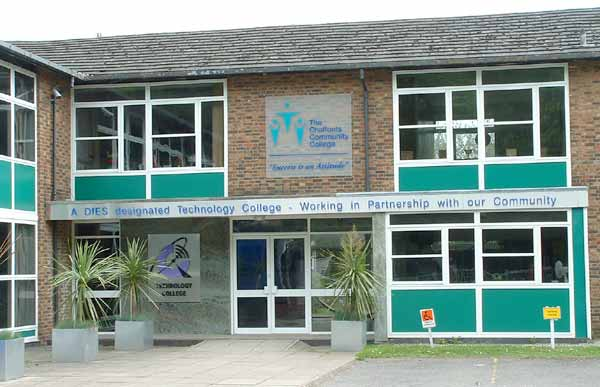
Chalfonts Community College

- Robertswood School – a co-educational State School for boys and girls 3–11.
- Maltman's Green School – Independent school for girls aged 3–11.
- Chalfont St Peter Infant School and Nursery – a co-educational infant school for children aged 3–7 years old.
- Chalfont St. Peter Church of England Academy – a co-educational junior school for ages 7–11.
- Gayhurst – A co-educational independent school for children age 3–11.
- Thorpe House – An independent boys school for ages 4–11, and a co-educational sixth form called Thorpe Sixth for ages 16–18.
- St. Joseph's Catholic Primary School – a co-educational Catholic school for ages 3–11.
- Chalfonts Community College – a co-educational secondary academy school for ages 11–18.
- Holy Cross Convent – Private Girls (Closed summer 2006)

== Churches ==
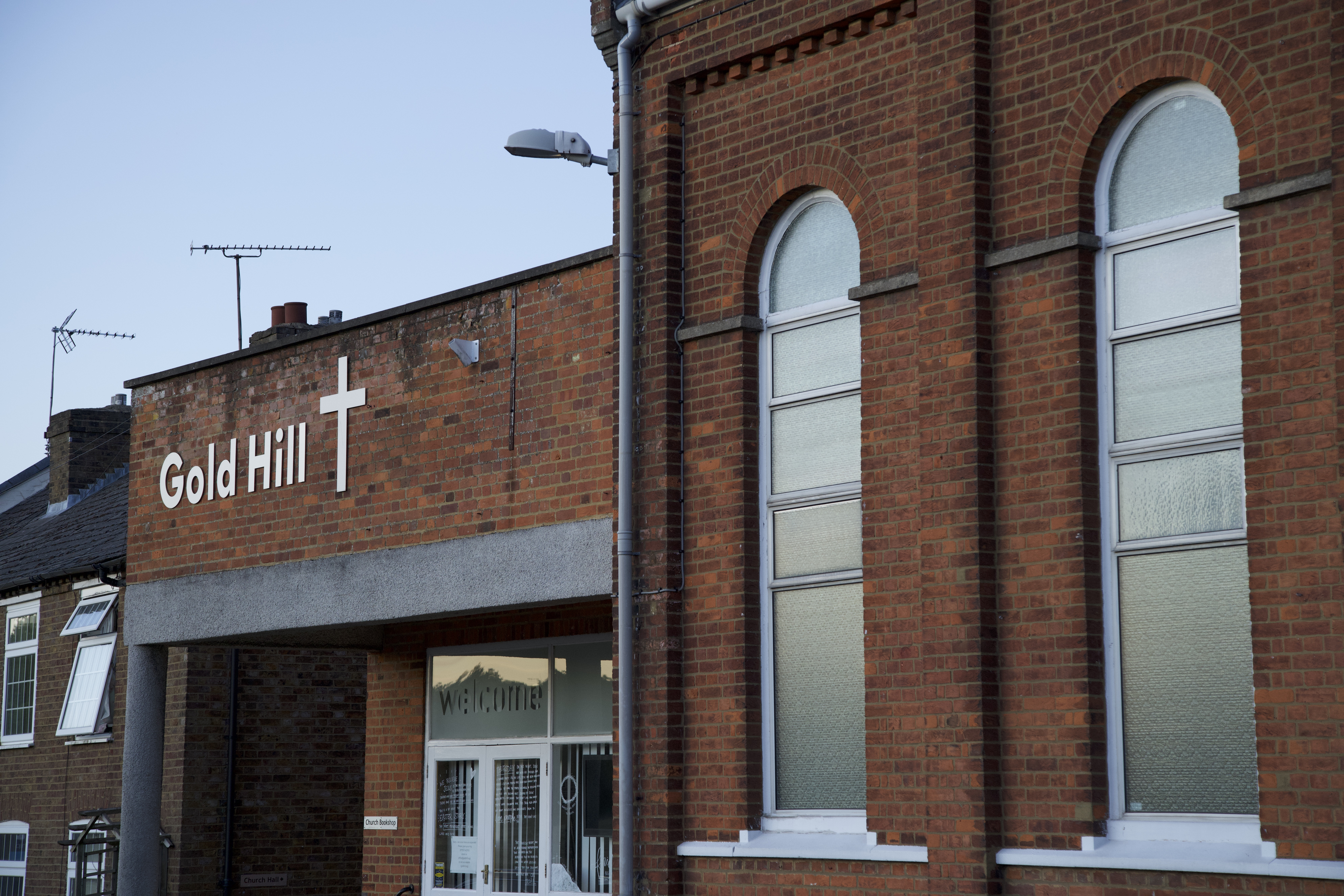
Gold Hill Baptist Church

- Chalfont St Peter Parish Church
- Gold Hill Baptist Church
- The Gospel Hall
- St. Joseph's Roman Catholic Church, Austenwood

== Hamlets ==
Hamlets in Chalfont St Peter include:

- Austenwood
- Chalfont Common
- Gravel Hill
- Layters Green
- Horn Hill

== Featuring in the media ==
Chalfont St Peter occasionally appears in media, the most recent being in Channel 4's Derren Brown: Apocalypse on 26 October 2012. Several local landmarks featured in the programme including The Village Hall pub, since returned to its former name, the Jolly Farmer, on Goldhill Common and Mr. Crusty on the high street.

== Sport and leisure ==
Chalfont St Peter has a Non-League football team Chalfont St Peter A.F.C. who play at Mill Meadow.

== Transport ==
Bus routes 104, 106 and 107 run through the main village and the more suburban areas. These bus routes include connections with Slough, Amersham, High Wycombe and Uxbridge. It is served by Gerrards Cross railway station, 1.2 miles (1.9 km) south, which has links to London Marylebone and High Wycombe, Oxford and Birmingham.

The village lies 9.5 miles (15.3 km) north west of London's Heathrow Airport.

Chalfont St Peter is just under four miles to the west of the Grand Union Canal.

== Chalfont Centre ==
The Chalfont Centre, on Chesham Lane, is a 100-acre site established in 1894. It exists as both the headquarters for the Epilepsy Society and exists to provide residential care for 100 patients with high-level epilepsy. In 1972 the NHS established the Special Assessment Unit, specially designed to treat patients with severe and complicated epilepsy.

== Other institutions ==
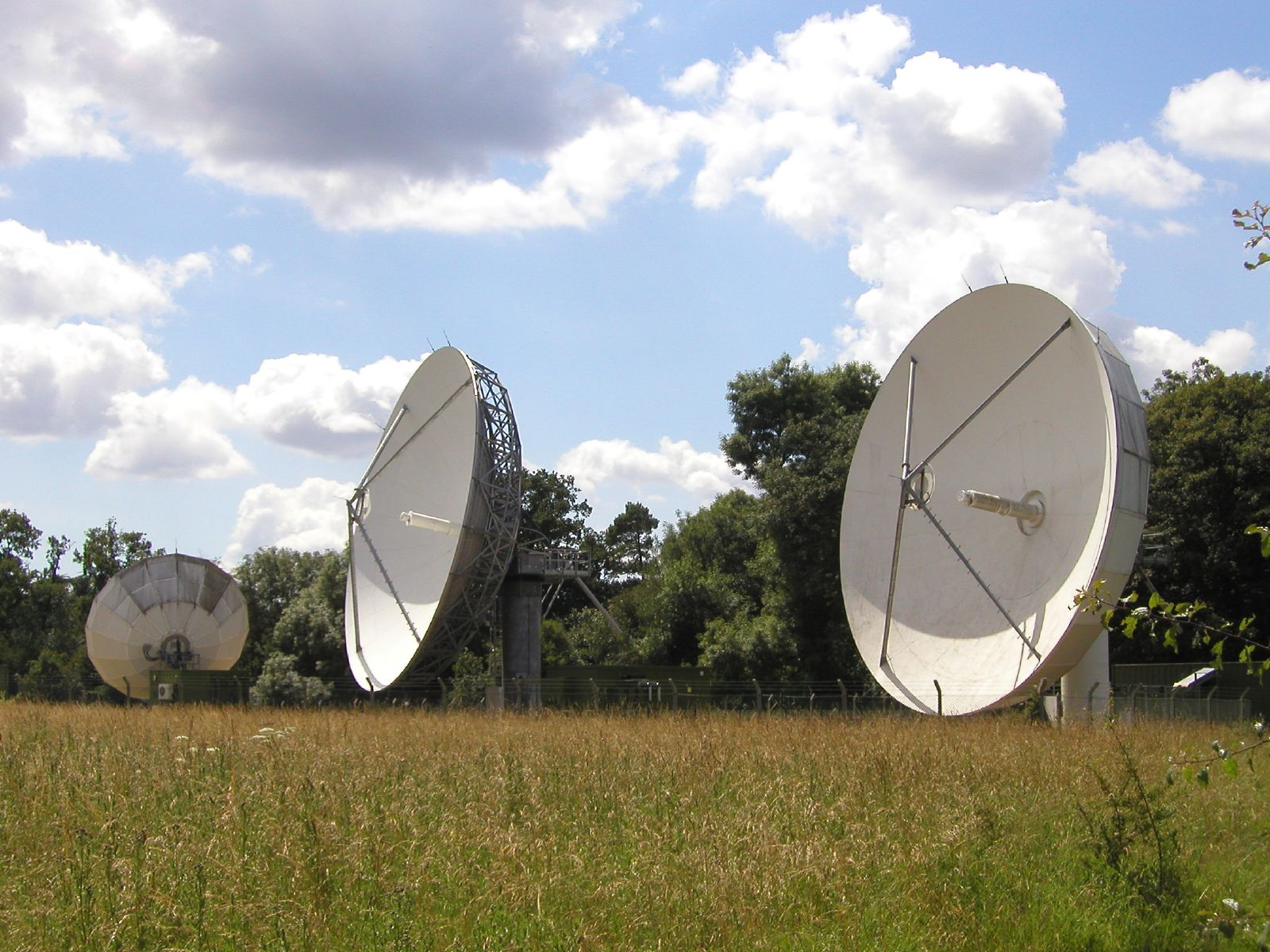
The Chalfont Grove Teleport has a number of large uplink satellite dishes

The British Forces Broadcasting Service is based at Arqiva's Chalfont Grove Teleport in the west of the village on the border with Chalfont St Giles. The National Lottery Draws were filmed at Arqiva's facilities between 2006 and 2012.

The headquarters of Bradt Travel Guides, founded by Hilary Bradt in 1974, was also located in Chalfont St Peter, until the company moved to Chesham in 2019.

RWS Group, one of the world's largest language service providers is headquartered at Chiltern Park, in the village centre.

== Notable residents ==
- Lewis Collins (1946–2013) – actor, best known for his role as Bodie in the LWT action series The Professionals. He lived at Mopes Farmhouse from the early 1980s until he moved to Los Angeles in the early 1990s.
- Ben Gill – former professional footballer for Watford F.C. and Cambridge United F.C. and current Chalfont St Peter A.F.C. player lives in Chalfont St Peter.
- John Laurie (1897–1980) – actor, best known for his role as Private James Frazer, in the BBC sitcom Dad's Army
- Alan Nunn May (1911–2003) – physicist and spy
- Patrick O'Brian (1914–2000) – author of the Aubrey–Maturin series of novels was born here
- Dame Margaret Rutherford (1892–1972) – actress, best known for her role as Miss Marple in several films loosely based on Agatha Christie's novels
- Thalissa Teixeira - Actress lived here from the age of 8 until leaving school
- Len Worley – amateur footballer
- John Le Carré (David Cornwell), whose father Ronald Cornwell owned 'Tunmers', a 1930s mansion in the village.
