= Hodgemoor Wood =

Biological Site of Special Scientific Interest in Buckinghamshire, England

Coordinates: 51.632434°N 0.60207°W

- Site of Special Scientific Interest
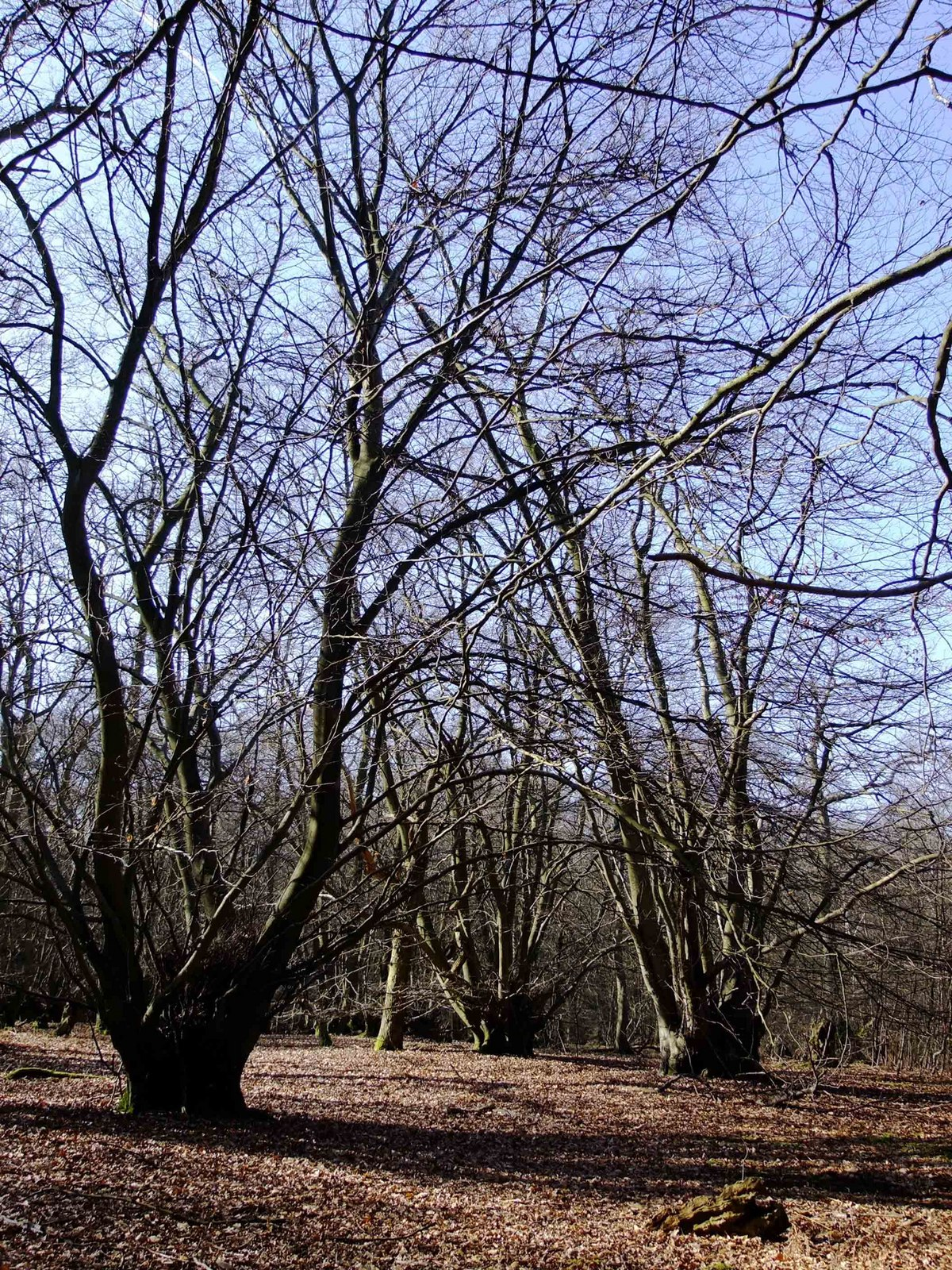
- Coppiced beech trees
- Location of Hodgemoor Wood.
- Area of search: Buckinghamshire
- Grid reference: SU968935
- Interest: Biological
- Area: 102.6 ha (254 acres)
- Notification date: 1992
- Location map: Magic Map

Hodgemoor Wood is a biological Site of Special Scientific Interest in Chalfont St Giles in Buckinghamshire. It is in the Chilterns Area of Outstanding Natural Beauty, and most of it is leased by Buckinghamshire County Council to the Forestry Commission.

The site is a large area of semi-natural broad-leaved woodland on unusually varied soil types of mottled clays, sands and gravels, and it has a similarly wide range of structure, including ancient coppiced oak, beech and hornbeam.

The core of the site is ancient woodland, with records going back to the thirteenth century. Ground vegetation includes bracken and brambles, with sedges in wetter areas. Butterflies include white admiral and purple hairstreak, and the nationally rare jewel beetle Agrilus biguttatus has been recorded. There is also a wide variety of breeding woodland birds.

There are extensive tracks with broad rides, walking trails, and cycling paths, and access to the site from Bottrells Lane.

Hodgemoor was the site of a Polish Refugee camp from 1946-1962. There were several camps in the Amersham area that housed Polish servicemen and their families. In particular the Hodgemoor Camp housed refugees from the 3rd Carpathian Rifle Division, many of whom later settled in the area, leading to the large local Polish population. At its peak the camp housed up to 600 people.
