= Edmund Ware (sculptor) =

Edmund Thomas Wyatt Ware (29 September 1883–26 July 1960) was a British teacher and sculptor.

He was born in Plaistow in Essex in 1883, the son of Emma (1858-) and Edmund Labdon Ware (1852-1939), a police constable. Ware studied at the Royal Academy Schools in London where he received a silver medal and a prize of £5.

He first registered his mark as an independent silversmith in October 1903, and a figural silver spoon crafted by him in 1904 is in the Pear Tree Collection. He taught goldsmithing and jewellery at the Central School of Art and Design (1905-1940). In the 1911 Census he was listed as 'Artist, Sculptor' and his place of employment as 52 Doughty Street in London. During World War I Ware served as a private in the Royal Army Medical Corps, in the Royal Army Service Corps, and as a sapper in the Royal Engineers. Ware was elected a member of the Royal Society of British Sculptors in 1916 and acted as its vice-president between 1948 and 1953. He became a Fellow in 1943.

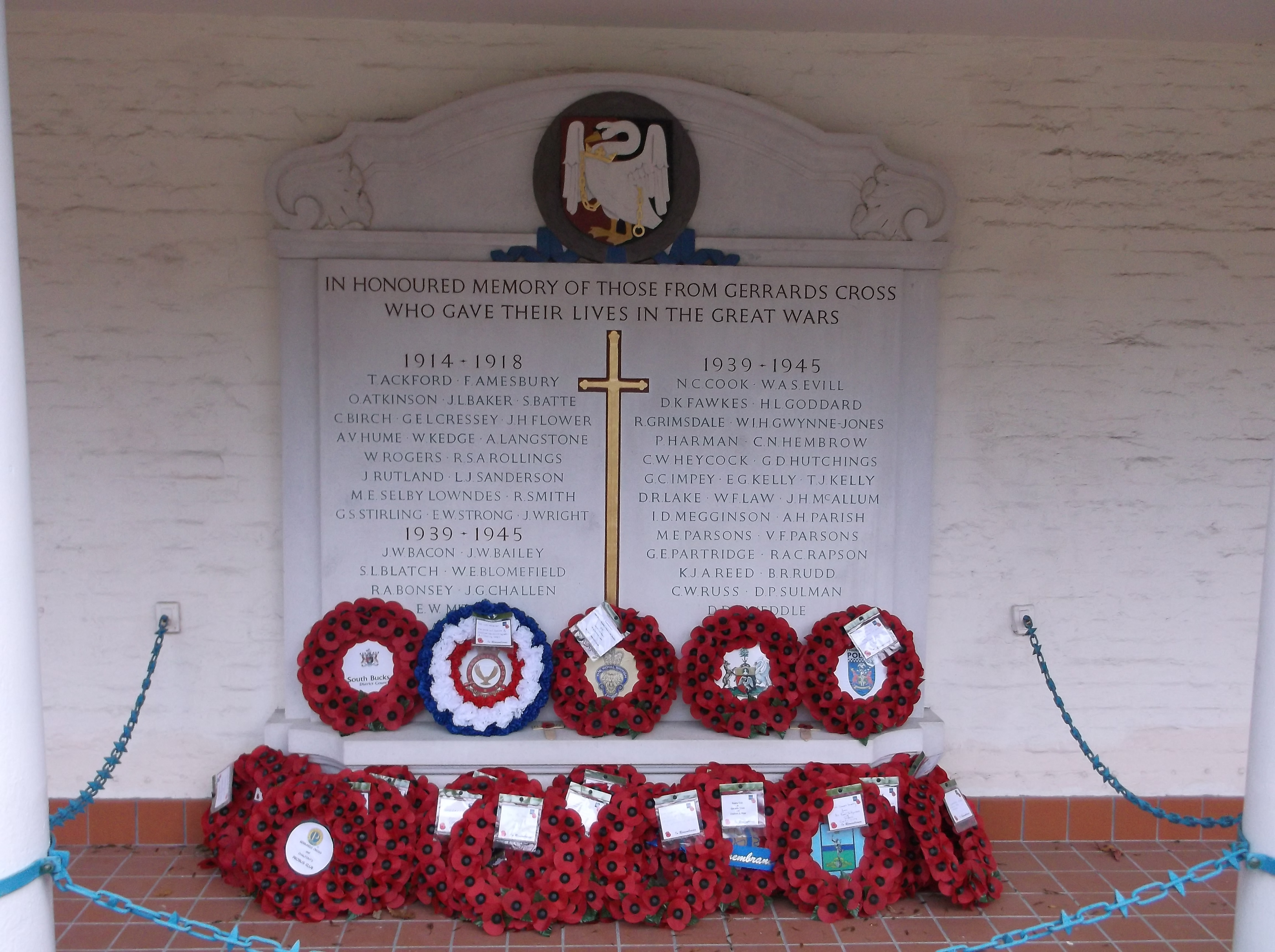
Ware sculpted the replacement memorial plaque on the front of the Gerrards Cross Memorial Building in 1947

Among others, Ware exhibited his work at: the Arts and Crafts Exhibition Society (1910); the Royal Academy Summer Exhibition (1913, 1914, 1934, 1935 and 1940), and at the Royal Cambrian Academy of Art Fifty-Third Annual Exhibition (1935). In 1940 he took up sculpting as a profession. In 1947 he sculpted the replacement plaque on the front of the Gerrards Cross Memorial Building.

In 1914 in London he married Theodora Margaret Sothern Lancaster (1885-1977), the older sister of the artist Lilian Lancaster (1886-1973). The engagement ring, designed and crafted by Ware in 1912, is displayed in the Jewellery Gallery of the Victoria and Albert Museum in London. Their daughter was the lithographer and enamelist Margaret Reade née Tennant Ware (1916-2006) and their son was John Lancaster Ware (1920-2004).

In his later years Ware lived at 18 Gunter Grove in Chelsea in London. He died in 1960 and in his will left an estate valued at £8982 11s. 3d. to his widow.
