= St James Church, Gerrards Cross =

St James' Church, Gerrards Cross
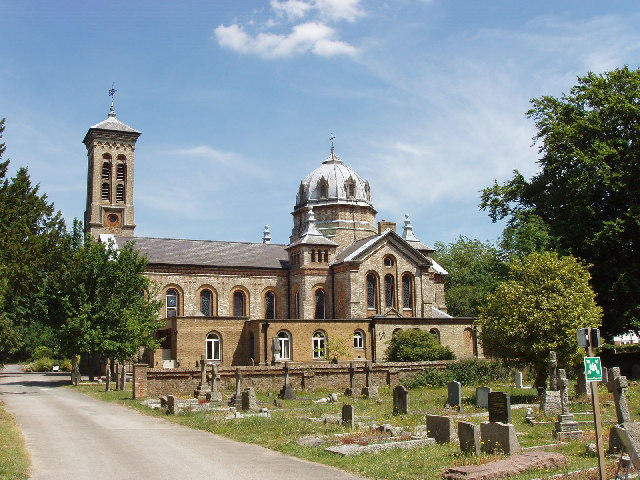
- St James' Church, Gerrards Cross
- St James' Church, Gerrards Cross
- 51°34′52.5″N 0°33′24″W
- OS grid reference: TQ 00093 87924
- Location: Gerrards Cross, Buckinghamshire
- Country: England
- Denomination: Church of England
- Churchmanship: Evangelical
- Website: saintjames.org.uk

History
- Dedication: James the Just

Architecture
- Heritage designation: Grade II* listed
- Architect: William Tite
- Completed: 1859

Administration
- Diocese: Diocese of Oxford
- Archdeaconry: Buckingham
- Deanery: Amersham
- Parish: St. James, Gerrards Cross with St. James Fulmer

Clergy
- Rector: The Revd Matthew Beeby

St James is an evangelical Church of England parish church in Gerrards Cross, Buckinghamshire. The Parish of St. James, within the Deanery of Amersham in the Diocese of Oxford, is the result of the amalgamation of St James Gerrards Cross and St James Fulmer, which began sharing a single parochial church council in 1984 and were formally merged in 1986.

The current rector is The Rev. Matt Beeby. One of the previous incumbents, Paul Gavin Williams, is currently the Bishop of Southwell and Nottingham.

The church is listed Grade II* on the National Heritage List for England.

== Services and activities ==
Regular services are conducted at St James Gerrards Cross each Sunday at 10:00 a.m. and 5:30 p.m. There are children's and youth activities alongside all services, and youth activities after the evening service. There are regular services at St James Fulmer each Sunday at 11:15am.

Talks and sermons from most Sunday services can be downloaded through the St James podcast service (link below).

There are other activities throughout the week, including a monthly prayer gathering on the first Wednesday of each month at 8:00pm.

An Alpha course is run three times a year.

== History ==
The church was consecrated by the Bishop of Oxford on 30 August 1859. It was erected at the sole cost of the sisters of the late General George Alexander Reid, who was MP for Windsor.

The St James Centre, a modern multifunction building to the rear of the site, was opened in March 2006 by George Carey.

The church celebrated its 150th anniversary on 31 August 2009.

== Organ ==
The pipe organ may be by Henry Jones from around the time the church was opened. It was modified in 1910 by S.F. Dalladay and 1970 by Cedric Arnold, Williamson & Hyatt. A specification of the organ can be found on the National Pipe Organ Register.
