= Gerrards Cross =

Town in Buckinghamshire, England

Coordinates: 51°35′15″N 0°33′15″W

- Town and civil parish
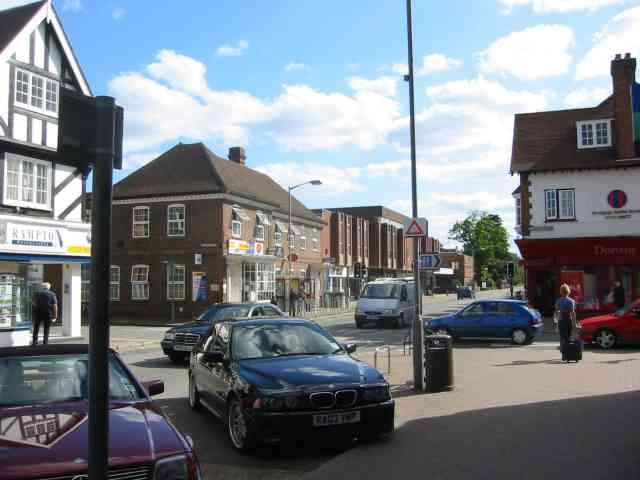
- Gerrards Cross Town Centre

- Location within Buckinghamshire
- Area: 10.88 km^{2} (4.20 sq mi)
- Population: 8,554 (Parish, 2021); 8,115 (Built up area, 2021)
- OS grid reference: TQ00258860
- Unitary authority: Buckinghamshire
- Ceremonial county: Buckinghamshire
- Region: South East
- Country: England
- Sovereign state: United Kingdom
- Post town: Gerrards Cross
- Postcode district: SL9
- Dialling code: 01753
- Police: Thames Valley
- Fire: Buckinghamshire
- Ambulance: South Central
- UK Parliament: Chesham and Amersham

Gerrards Cross is a town and civil parish in Buckinghamshire, England. It is contiguous with Chalfont St Peter, lying immediately south of it. Gerrards Cross is a short distance west of the London Borough of Hillingdon, from which it is separated by the parish of Denham. Other neighbouring villages include Fulmer, Hedgerley, Iver Heath and Stoke Poges. It is 19 miles (31 km) west-north-west of central London. The town stands on the lower slopes of the Chiltern Hills, and the River Misbourne flows through the parish, north-east of the town. Bulstrode Park Camp was an Iron Age fortified encampment. The town is close to the M25 motorway and the M40 motorway, the latter running beside woodland on the town's southern boundary.

== History ==
The site of a minor Iron Age hillfort, Bulstrode Park Camp, is to the south-west of the town centre. It is a scheduled ancient monument.

The area which is now Gerrards Cross was historically an area of wasteland known as Chalfont Heath, which later became known as Gerrards Cross Common. In the medieval period, there was no village in the area, which straddled the edges of five different parishes. The name Gerrards Cross, sometimes spelled Jarretts Cross, is recorded from at least 1448, and may relate to an early landowner, Gerard of Chalfont, who is recorded as having owned land in the area in the 14th century.

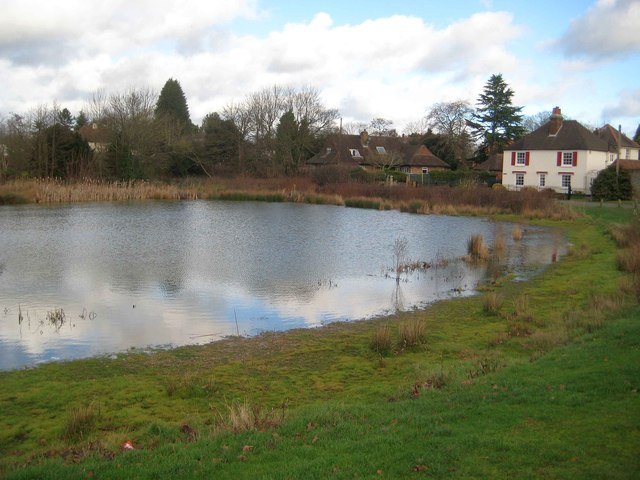
Latchmoor Pond

The origin of the 'cross' element of the name is uncertain; a cross is marked on early maps near the Bull Hotel and Latchmoor Pond at the western end of the common, but whether it was a standing cross marking a boundary or meeting place, or a name for a crossroads is unclear. The modern crossroads of the Oxford Road (the A40) and Windsor Road / Packhorse Road (B416) was not created until 1707, when an old north-south road through Bulstrode Park was diverted, which was many years after the name Gerrards Cross was first recorded.

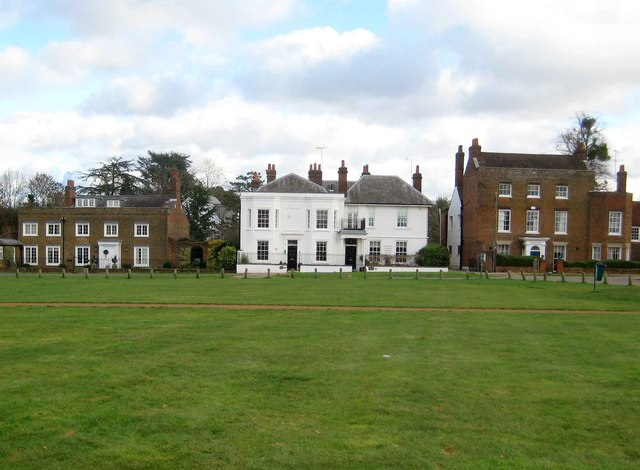
Houses at West Common

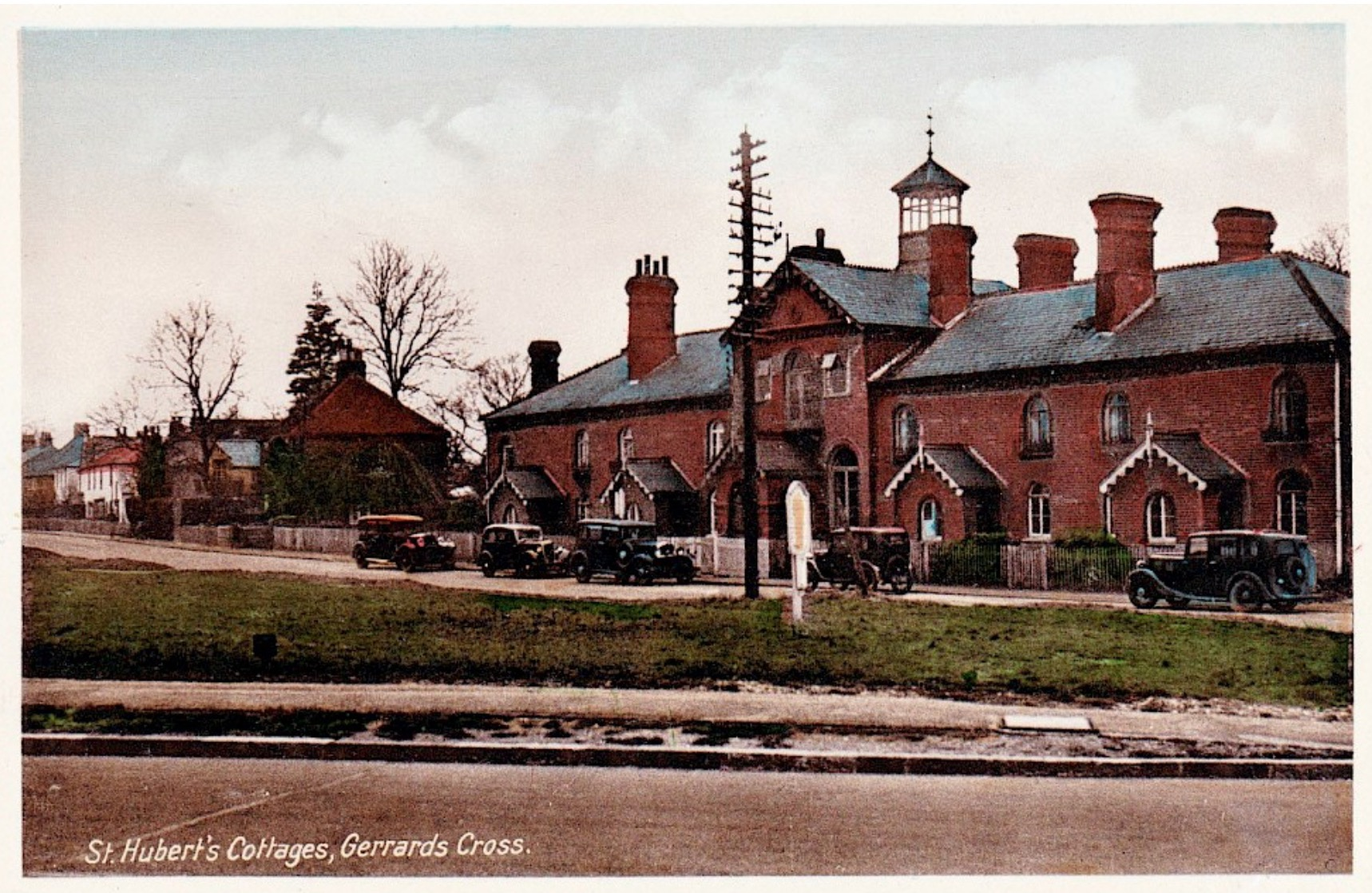
An early C20 postcard depicting St Huberts Cottages (built c.1866 by Thomas Mayne Reid) on East Common

Until the 19th century, development in the area was limited to a small number of buildings immediately adjoining the common, most of which were in the parish of Chalfont St Peter.

In 1859, St James' Church was built on Oxford Road. It was initially a chapel of ease for the parish of Fulmer in which it lay, but in 1861 it became parish church of a new ecclesiastical parish called St James, Gerrard's Cross, created from parts of the parishes of Chalfont St Peter, Fulmer, Iver, Langley Marish, and Upton-cum-Chalvey. The creation of the ecclesiastical parish did not change the civil parish boundaries. A new civil parish of Gerrards Cross matching the ecclesiastical parish was subsequently created in 1895.

Gerrards Cross remained a relatively small village at the turn of the 20th century. The parish had a population of 552 at the 1901 census. In 1906, Gerrards Cross railway station opened on the Great Western and Great Central Joint Railway, a new line jointly built by the two companies to improve their routes from the Midlands to London. The station is to the north-east of Gerrards Cross Common, and the area around the station was developed soon after the station opened; by 1911, the population of the parish had grown to 1,612, and it then grew steadily throughout the 20th century.

== Facilities ==
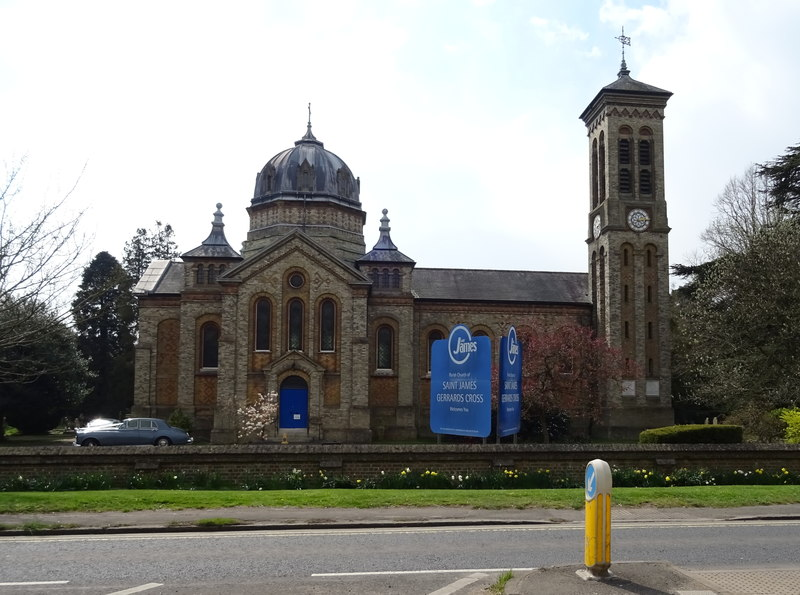
St James's Church, Gerrards Cross, built in 1861.

The large and distinctive parish church is dedicated to St. James. It was built in 1859 as a memorial to Colonel George Alexander Reid who was MP for Windsor, and designed by Sir William Tite in yellow brick with a Byzantine-style dome, Chinese-looking turrets and an Italianate Campanile. In 1969 the singer Lulu married Maurice Gibb of the Bee Gees in the church. The actress Margaret Rutherford is buried with her husband Stringer Davis in the St James Church graveyard.

The town has its own library and its own cinema, the Everyman Gerrards Cross, which originally opened in 1925.

Independent schools include St Mary's (all girls- through to sixth form). Students of secondary school age attend either one of the local grammar schools, such as Dr Challoner's Grammar School (Boys with co-educational Sixth Form), Dr Challoner's High School (Girls), The Royal Grammar School, High Wycombe (Boys), John Hampden Grammar School (Boys), and Beaconsfield High School (Girls) Chesham Grammar School (Co-ed), and the local Upper School, Chalfonts Community College, which is the catchment school.

On the south side of the town is the Gerrards Cross Memorial Building, on the site of the former vicarage. The building was designed by Sir Edwin Lutyens and unveiled in 1922 to commemorate the town's losses during the First World War. It is the only example of a Lutyens war memorial designed with a functional purpose.

== Governance ==
There are two tiers of local government covering Gerrards Cross, at civil parish (town) and unitary authority level: Gerrards Cross Town Council and Buckinghamshire Council. The town council meets at the Gerrards Cross Memorial Centre on East Common and has its offices at the adjoining South Lodge.

From the creation of the civil parish of Gerrards Cross in 1895 until 1974 it was included in the Eton Rural District. The parish then became part of the Beaconsfield district in 1974, which was renamed South Bucks in 1980. The district was abolished in 2020, when Buckinghamshire Council was created, also taking the functions of the abolished county council.

Since 1974, parish councils have had the right to declare their parishes to be a town. Gerrards Cross Parish Council declared the parish to be a town with effect from 1 January 2016. The council therefore became Gerrards Cross Town Council.

== Transport ==
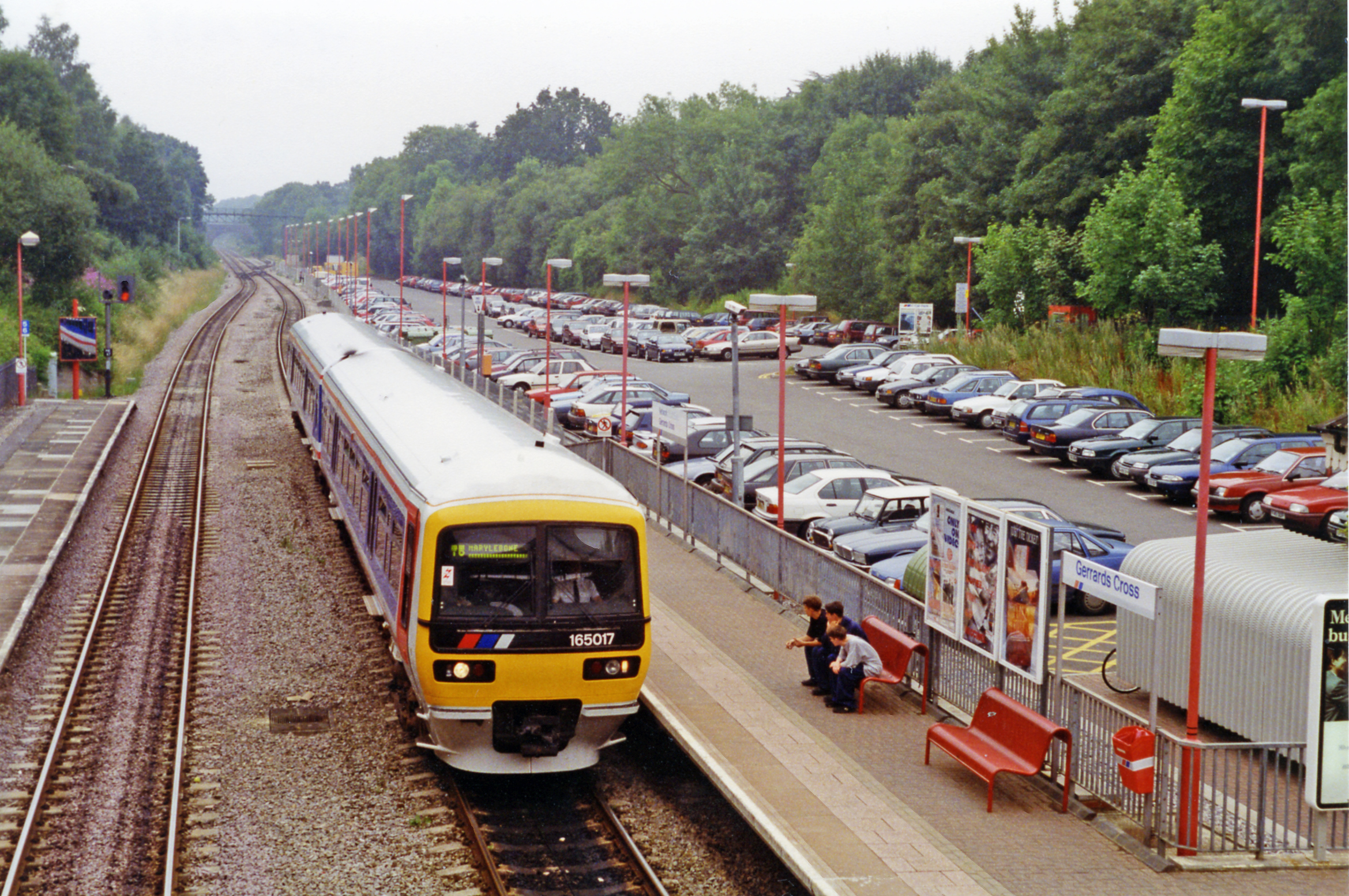
Gerrards Cross station, in 1994, viewed NW from the footbridge, towards Princes Risborough.

The town has a railway station on the Chiltern Main Line which opened on 2 April 1906. This provides services to London, High Wycombe and Oxford with a commuting time of 18 minutes on the fast train to London Marylebone. The Gerrards Cross Tunnel was constructed over the railway south-east of the station from 2003 to 2010 to allow Tesco to build a supermarket. A new arch over the section of deep railway cutting collapsed on 30 June 2005. Though, nobody was injured, it resulted in a line closure for over six weeks. Compensation by Tesco to Chiltern was reported as £8.5m and the retailer compensated by funding a media campaign to reinstate business immediately lost by the closure. Construction of a correctly constructed arch began in January 2009.

The 11.36am from London Paddington to Gerrards Cross was an 'parliamentary train' recognised as an outlandish loss-making service to prevent the link to that terminus being closed or re-allocated. This train later changed to terminate at West Ruislip. In 2011, National Rail was lobbied to phase the service out. As of December 2022, the service no longer runs and has been replaced by a bus service.

The town lies 8.4 miles (13.5 km) north west of London's Heathrow Airport.

== Demographics ==
In the 2021 Census, the largest religious affiliations in Gerrards Cross were Christian (46.2%), those with no religion (22.4%), Sikh (10.5%), Hindu (7.5%), Muslim (6.4%), Jewish (0.8%), Buddhist (0.5%) and Other (0.5%).

It was reported 65.5% of people living in Gerrards Cross were reported as White (65.5%), Asian (25.5%), Mixed (4.0%), Black (4.0%) and Other (1.1%).

== Recent history ==
Many houses built during development in the 1950s had defective tiles, leading to the highest court reported judgment Young & Marten Ltd v McManus Childs Ltd, holding that a person who contracts to do work and supply materials implicitly warrants that the materials will be fit for purpose, even if the purchaser specifies the materials to be used.

== Notable people ==
- Matt Aitken, song writer, record producer and musician from Stock Aitken Waterman lived in Gerrards Cross.
- Roy Castle, dancer, singer, comedian, actor, television presenter and musician, lived in Gerrards Cross (died 2 September 1994).
- Amal Clooney, barrister and human rights activist, moved from Lebanon to Gerrards Cross with her family at the age of 2.
- Angela Douglas, actress, born in Gerrards Cross 29 October 1940.
- Thomas Mayne Reid, Victorian novelist and adventurer, lived in Gerrards Cross in the 1860s and constructed St Huberts Cottages and The Rancho (inspired by his travels in South America).
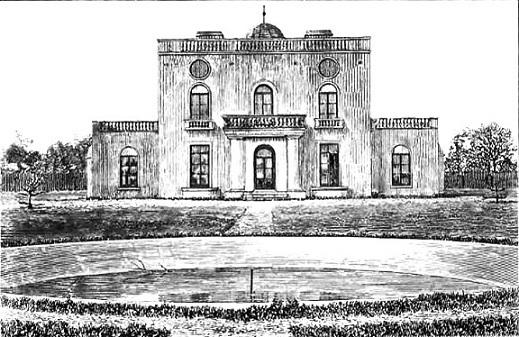
  A drawing of Mayne Reid's now demolished 'Rancho'
- Helen McKay, singer, first person to sing on the BBC Television Service, 26 August 1936, lived in Gerrards Cross.
- Kenneth More, actor, born in Gerrards Cross 20 September 1914 (died 12 July 1982).
- Des O'Connor, entertainer (died 14 November 2020).
- Dominic Raab, politician, Conservative Member of Parliament for Esher and Walton and former Deputy Prime Minister, Secretary of State for Justice, Lord Chancellor and Foreign Secretary, grew up in Gerrards Cross.
- Joan G. Robinson, author and illustrator, lived in Gerrards Cross. Her best-known book is When Marnie Was There, which was adapted into an animated film by Studio Ghibli.
- Peter Stringfellow, businessman and nightclub owner, lived in Gerrards Cross (died 7 June 2018).
- Benjamin Zander, composer, born in Gerrards Cross 9 March 1939.

== Literary references ==
Gerrards Cross was one of the locations for the crime thriller “The Stalkers” (2013) by Paul Finch, a former police officer and journalist and now a full-time writer.

Gerrards Cross also featured in a true story about love and war based on real letters “The Very White of Love” (2018) by S.K. Worrall.

In the story “Carousel” (2013) depicting a spoiled boy from an Indian family the author Rajeev Rana also placed some of the action in Gerrards Cross.

This town also served as the setting for the novella “Amy's Travels” (2024) by Lilly Khripko (born in 2013 in the UK and now living in Gerrards Cross). The book tells the story of a tweenage girl recalling her early childhood.

Ian Anderson mentions Gerrards Cross in his song "Journeyman", which was included in their studio album "Heavy Horses", released ion 1978.
