= Harwich and North Essex =

UK Parliament constituency (since 2010)

Coordinates: 51.92°N 1.02°E

- County constituency for the House of Commons
- Interactive map of boundaries since 2024
- Location within the East of England
- County: Essex
- Electorate: 74,838 (March 2020)
- Major settlements: Harwich, Wivenhoe, Manningtree, Brightlingsea

Current constituency
- Created: 2010
- Member of Parliament: Bernard Jenkin (Conservative)
- Seats: One
- Created from: Harwich, North Essex

Harwich and North Essex /ˈhærɪtʃ ... ˈɛsɪks/ is a constituency (Note: A county constituency (for the purposes of election expenses and type of returning officer)) represented in the House of Commons of the UK Parliament by Bernard Jenkin of the Conservative Party since its creation in 2010. (Note: As with all constituencies, the constituency elects one Member of Parliament (MP) by the first past the post system of election every five years.) Jenkin had previously been MP for the predecessor constituencies of Colchester North (1992-1997) then North Essex (1997-2010)

== Constituency profile ==
The Harwich and North Essex constituency is located in Essex and covers the rural areas surrounding the city of Colchester. Its largest town is Harwich which has a population of around 20,000. Other settlements include the Colchester neighbourhoods of The Hythe and Old Heath, the towns of Brightlingsea, West Mersea, Wivenhoe and Manningtree and the villages of West Bergholt and Lawford. The area has a maritime heritage and the constituency's coastal towns have a history of shipbuilding and fishing. Brightlingsea has a connection with the Cinque Ports confederation as a "limb" or subsidiary of the port of Sandwich in Kent. Harwich International Port offers regular ferry services to the Hook of Holland and the town was the home port of the Mayflower, which transported English settlers to Massachusetts in 1620. The constituency contains the main campus of the University of Essex, which lies just outside Wivenhoe. The constituency has average levels of wealth; Harwich has high levels of deprivation whilst the rural areas are generally affluent. House prices are similar to the national average.

In general, residents of Harwich and North Essex are older and have average levels of income and education compared to the rest of the country. A high proportion of residents work in education. White people made up 94% of the population at the 2021 census. At the local council level, most of the constituency is represented by Conservatives, whilst some rural areas elected Liberal Democrats and Harwich elected Labour Party councillors. An estimated 56% of voters in the constituency supported leaving the European Union in the 2016 referendum, higher than the nationwide figure of 52%.

== History ==
The seat was created for the 2010 general election following a review of the Parliamentary representation of Essex by the Boundary Commission for England. It was formed from the majority of the abolished constituency of North Essex, together with the town of Harwich and surrounding areas, previously part of the abolished Harwich constituency, with the majority of the Harwich seat creating the new seat of Clacton.

== Boundaries ==
=== 2010-2024 ===
Map of boundaries 2010–2024

- The District of Tendring wards of Alresford, Ardleigh and Little Bromley, Bradfield, Wrabness and Wix, Brightlingsea, Great and Little Oakley, Great Bentley, Harwich and Kingsway, Lawford, Manningtree, Mistley, Little Bentley and Tendring, Ramsey and Parkeston, and Thorrington, Frating, Elmstead and Great Bromley; and
- The Borough of Colchester wards of Dedham and Langham, East Donyland, Fordham and Stour, Great Tey, Pyefleet, West Bergholt and Eight Ash Green, West Mersea, Wivenhoe Cross, and Wivenhoe Quay.

=== Current ===
Further to the 2023 review of Westminster constituencies, which came into effect for the 2024 general election, the composition of the constituency is as follows (as they existed on 1 December 2020):

- The District of Tendring wards of Alresford & Elmstead, Ardleigh & Little Bromley, Brightlingsea, Dovercourt All Saints, Dovercourt Bay, Dovercourt Tollgate, Dovercourt Vines & Parkeston, Harwich & Kingsway, Lawford, Manningtree & Mistley, and Stour Valley;
- The City of Colchester wards of Lexden & Braiswick (part); Mersea & Pyefleet, Old Heath & The Hythe, Rural North, and Wivenhoe.

Minor changes – Old Heath and The Hythe areas to the south east of Colchester city centre added from Colchester, offset by the transfer of some rural areas in the east to Clacton.

== Members of Parliament ==
Harwich and North Essex prior to 2010

Election	Member	Party
2010	Sir Bernard Jenkin	Conservative

== Elections ==
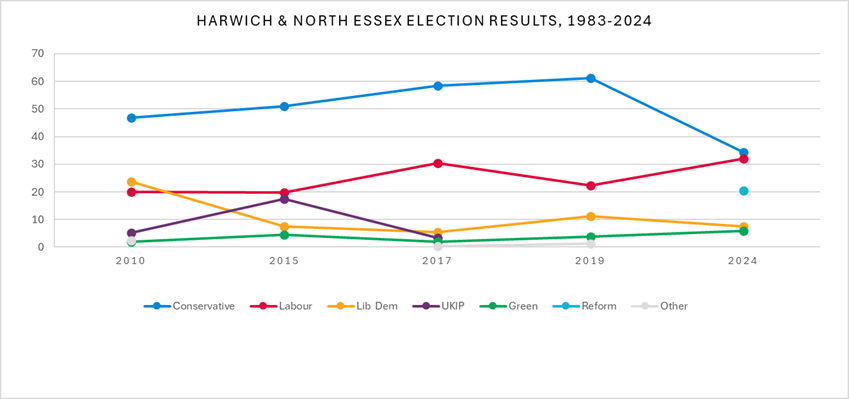
Hawrich & North Essex election results 2010–2024

=== Elections in the 2020s ===
General election 2024: Harwich and North Essex
Party	Candidate	Votes	%	±%
Conservative	Bernard Jenkin	16,522	34.4	−24.2
Labour	Alex Diner	15,360	32.0	+6.1
Reform	Mark Cole	9,806	20.4	N/A
Liberal Democrats	Natalie Sommers	3,561	7.4	−3.3
Green	Andrew Canessa	2,794	5.8	+2.2
Majority		1,162	2.4	−30.3
Turnout		48,043	63.0	−9.6
Registered electors		76,579		
Conservative hold		Swing	−15.2	

=== Elections in the 2010s ===
2019 notional result
Party	Vote	%
Conservative	31,668	58.6
Labour	14,017	25.9
Liberal Democrats	5,801	10.7
Green	1,924	3.6
Others	674	1.3
Turnout	54,084	72.3
Electorate	74,838	

General election 2019: Harwich and North Essex
Party	Candidate	Votes	%	±%
Conservative	Bernard Jenkin	31,830	61.3	+2.8
Labour	Stephen Rice	11,648	22.4	−8.0
Liberal Democrats	Mike Beckett	5,866	11.3	+5.9
Green	Peter Banks	1,945	3.7	+1.7
Independent	Richard Browning-Smith	411	0.8	N/A
Independent	Tony Francis	263	0.5	N/A
Majority		20,182	38.9	+10.8
Turnout		51,963	70.1	−1.6
Conservative hold		Swing	+5.4	

General election 2017: Harwich and North Essex
Party	Candidate	Votes	%	±%
Conservative	Bernard Jenkin	29,921	58.5	+7.5
Labour	Rosalind Scott	15,565	30.4	+10.7
Liberal Democrats	Dominic Graham	2,787	5.4	−2.0
UKIP	Aaron Hammond	1,685	3.3	−14.2
Green	Blake Roberts	1,042	2.0	−2.4
CPA	Stephen Todd	141	0.3	N/A
Majority		14,356	28.1	−3.2
Turnout		51,141	71.7	+1.8
Conservative hold		Swing	−1.6	

General election 2015: Harwich and North Essex
Party	Candidate	Votes	%	±%
Conservative	Bernard Jenkin	24,722	51.0	+4.1
Labour	Edward Browne	9,548	19.7	−0.2
UKIP	Mark Hughes	8,464	17.5	+12.3
Liberal Democrats	Dominic Graham	3,576	7.4	−16.2
Green	Christopher Flossman	2,122	4.4	+2.5
Majority		15,174	31.3	+8.0
Turnout		48,432	69.9	+0.6
Conservative hold		Swing		

General election 2010: Harwich and North Essex
Party	Candidate	Votes	%	±%
Conservative	Bernard Jenkin*	23,001	46.9	+4.3
Liberal Democrats	James Raven	11,554	23.6	+4.3
Labour	Darren Barrenger	9,774	19.9	−10.9
UKIP	Simon Anselmi	2,572	5.2	+1.5
BNP	Stephen Robey	1,065	2.2	N/A
Green	Chris Fox	909	1.9	−1.8
Independent	Peter Bates	170	0.3	N/A
Majority		11,447	23.3	
Turnout		49,000	69.3	
Conservative hold		Swing	±0.0	

* Served as an MP in the 2005–2010 Parliament

== See also ==
- Parliamentary constituencies in Essex
- Parliamentary constituencies in the East of England
