= William Beresford (politician) =

British politician (1797–1883)

William Beresford (17 April 1797 – 6 October 1883) was a British Conservative politician.

== Background ==
He was the only son of Marcus Beresford and his wife Frances Arabella, daughter of Joseph Leeson, 1st Earl of Milltown. Beresford was educated at St Mary Hall, Oxford, where he graduated with a Bachelor of Arts in 1819 and a Master of Arts five years later. He joined the British Army and served in the 9th Queen's Royal Lancers and then in the 12th (Prince of Wales's) Royal Lancers, finally as a major.

== Career ==
Beresford contested County Waterford unsuccessfully in 1837. He was elected for Harwich in the next general election in 1841, which he represented until 1847. Beresford and Charles Newdegate were the Conservative whips in the House of Commons after the party split over the Corn Laws. His relations with Benjamin Disraeli were strained, with Beresford often taking his cue from Lord Stanley in the Lords instead of the nominal leader in the commons. As Chief Whip he managed the 1852 general election, widely noted for its venality (even by the standards of the day), and was censured by the house for "reckless indifference to systematic bribery". Disraeli took the opportunity to remove Beresford, who was briefly succeeded as whip by William Forbes Mackenzie. Mackenzie, however, lost his seat for much the same reason, and was in turn succeeded by Sir William Joliffe. The management of elections Disraeli transferred to his solicitor, Philip Rose. Beresford was appointed Secretary at War in 1852, and on this occasion was sworn in as a Privy Counsellor.

== Family ==
In 1833, he married Catherine, the youngest daughter of George Robert Heneage, and had by her two sons and a daughter.

== Notes ==
Parliament of the United Kingdom
Preceded by Alexander Ellice; John Charles Herries	Member of Parliament for Harwich; 1841–1847; With: John Attwood	Succeeded by John Bagshaw; John Attwood
Preceded by Charles Round; John Tyssen Tyrell	Member of Parliament for North Essex; 1847–1865; With: John Tyssen Tyrell 1847–1857; Charles Du Cane 1857–1865	Succeeded by Sir Thomas Western, Bt; Charles Du Cane
Political offices
Preceded by Robert Vernon Smith	Secretary at War; 1852	Succeeded by Sidney Herbert
