= Tyrell baronets =

Extinct baronetcy in the Baronetage of the United Kingdom

Escutcheon of the Tyrell baronets of Boreham House

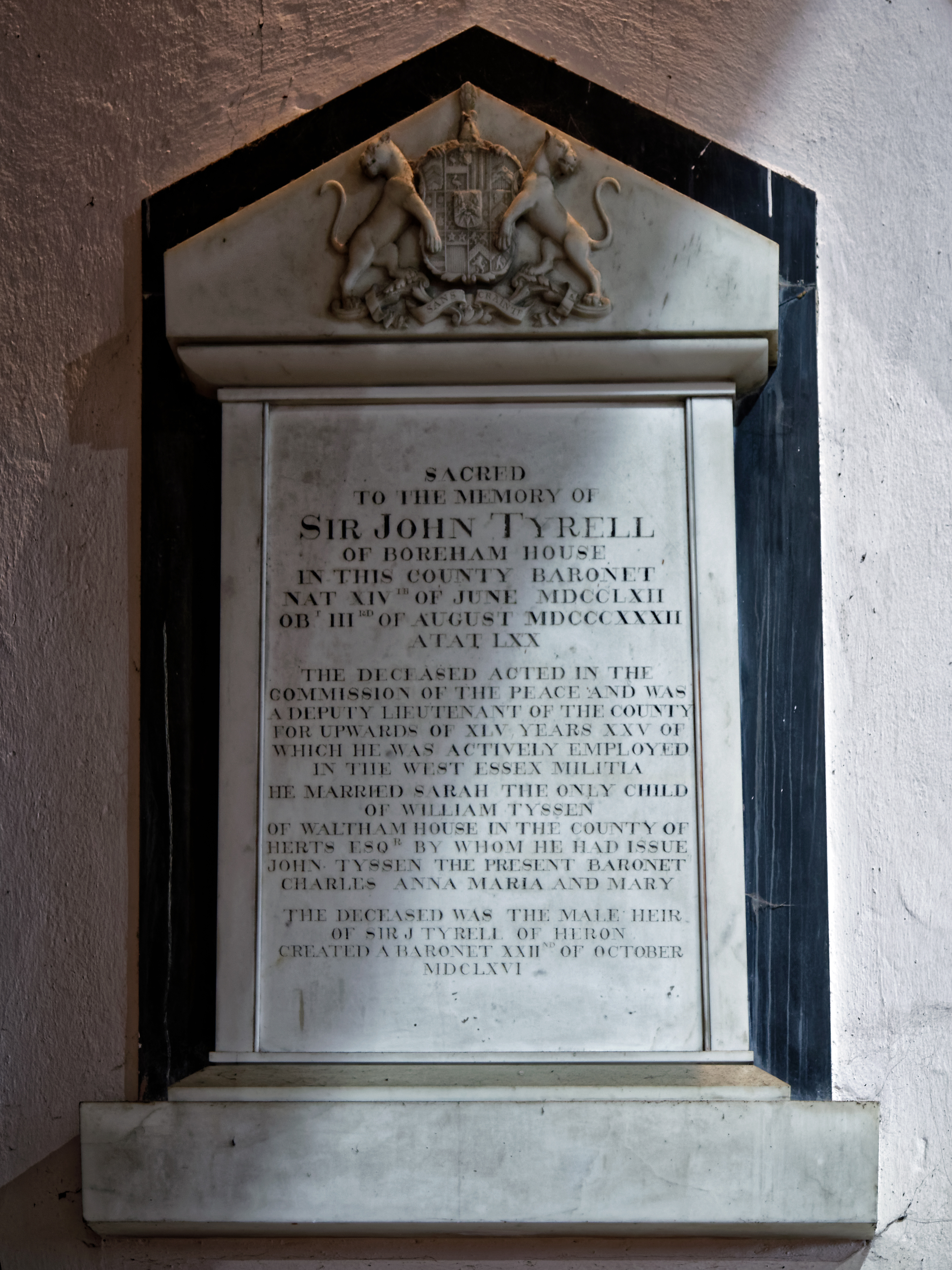
Sir John Tyrell (1762–1832) wall memorial in St Andrew's Church, Boreham

The Tyrell Baronetcy, of Boreham House in the County of Sussex, was a title in the Baronetage of the United Kingdom. It was created on 28 September 1809 for John Tyrell. The second Baronet sat as member of parliament for Essex and Essex North. The title became extinct on his death in 1877.

== Tyrell baronets, of Boreham House (1809) ==
- Sir John Tyrell, 1st Baronet (1762–1832)
- Sir John Tyssen Tyrell, 2nd Baronet (1795–1877)

== See also ==
- Tyrrell baronets

Baronetage of the United Kingdom
Preceded by Halford baronets	Tyrell baronets of Boreham House; 28 September 1809	Succeeded by Sheppard baronets
