= Colchester North =

Colchester North may refer to:

- Colchester North (provincial electoral district), a current provincial electoral constituency in the Canadian province of Nova Scotia,
- Colchester North (UK Parliament constituency), a former electoral constituency in the United Kingdom.
- Colchester railway station, sometimes known as Colchester North
