= Louisa Buck =

British art critic

- Occupation: Artist
- Parent(s): Antony Buck; Judy Grant

Louisa Buck is a British art critic and contemporary art correspondent for The Art Newspaper. She is also an author or co-author of books on contemporary art market.

== Early life and family background ==
Louisa Buck is the only daughter of the late Sir Antony Buck MP QC (1926–2003) by his first wife, Judy Grant, from whom he was divorced after 34 years. His marriage to his second wife, Spanish fashion designer, Bienvenida Pérez Blanco, who was 30 years younger than him, ended in scandal, when she admitted adultery with Sir Peter Harding, the British Chief of the Defence Staff, and sold her story to the News of the World for £150,000. Prior to this, Sir Antony had seemed "the epitome of middle-ranking orthodox Tory establishment achievement": he was Conservative Party MP for Colchester for 30 years, and under Edward Heath, Parliamentary Under-Secretary of State for Defence (Royal Navy) (1972–74). Louisa Buck said at her father's remembrance service that he had a "lifelong loathing of pomposity, wicked irreverence and dogged loyalty, even when it was against his own interests".

== Political activity ==
In August 2014, Buck was one of 200 public figures who were signatories to a letter to The Guardian opposing Scottish independence in the run-up to September's referendum on that issue.

== Career ==
She writes on contemporary art for a number of different journals, as well as making television appearances. Her first book, Moving Targets 2, gives profiles of the artists, curators, collectors, critics and galleries who contribute to the "best and most challenging art that is being made in Britain". Profiles of artists include Damien Hirst, Tracey Emin, Chris Ofili and Cornelia Parker; critics include Adrian Searle, curators, Sir Nicholas Serota and dealers, Jay Jopling of the White Cube gallery.

In 2000, she criticised the Stuckists artists, "I saw the last Stuckists exhibition and some of the work was just plain cack ... There may be a lot of boring conceptual work but to have a grumpy reactionary movement against it is just daft."

In 2004, she compiled a report for the Arts Council, Market Matters: The dynamics of the contemporary art market. She quoted Thomas Hoving, former Director of the Metropolitan Museum of Art, "Art is sexy! Art is money-sexy! Art is money-sexy-social-climbing-fantastic!", a description she elsewhere says has "never ... seemed more apt"

In 2005, she was a member of the Turner Prize jury, which awarded the prize to Simon Starling, whose main exhibit Shedboatshed was a wooden shed he had converted into a boat, sailed down the River Rhine and then turned back into the original shed.

== Personal life ==
For two years during the 1980s she had a relationship with George Melly and in his will was left his collection of surrealist books and magazines.

== Bibliography ==
- Moving Targets 2: A User's Guide to British Art Now (London: Tate Gallery Publishing, 2000).
- Owning Art: The Contemporary Art Collector's Handbook (co-authored with Judith Greer, London: Cultureshock Media, 2006).
- Commissioning Contemporary Art. A Handbook for Curators, Collectors and Artists (co-authored with Daniel McClean, London: Thames & Hudson, 2012).
