= George Sandford (British politician) =

British politician

George Montagu Warren Sandford JP DL (born Peacocke; 1821 – 17 June 1879) was a British Conservative Party politician. He adopted the surname Sandford in lieu of Peacocke in 1866.

Sandford was the eldest son of George Peacocke, of Dawlish, Devon, and his second wife, Jemima Durnford (by his 2nd wife, Jemima, daughter of Andrew Montagu Isaacson Durnford. He was the nephew and heir of Sir Warren Marmaduke Peacocke. He was educated at Eton College and Trinity College, Cambridge. He earned his B.A. from New Inn Hall, Oxford in 1844 and his M.A. in 1849 from Magdalene College, Cambridge. He joined the Inner Temple in 1839 and was called to the bar in 1846.

At the 1852 general election, Sandford (as Peacocke) was elected Member of Parliament for Harwich but his election was voided on petition in the following year.

Sandford won a by-election at Maldon in August 1854 where the 1852 election had also been declared void. He was defeated in 1857, re-elected in 1859, and 1865, but defeated again when Maldon's representation was reduced to one seat in 1868. He was re-elected in 1874, and held the seat until he resigned from the House of Commons on 5 December 1878 by becoming Steward of the Manor of Northstead.

On 8 January 1866, he assumed the surname and arms of Sandford, by Royal Licence, to inherit from his grandmother, Mary Peacocke of Barntick, County Clare, heiress of the Sandford family of Sandford Court, County Kilkenny.

He resided at Reeves Hall, Essex, and Moulton Park, Northamptonshire. On 15 April 1858, he married Augusta Mary Greville, daughter of Algernon Frederick Greville. He died at his home in Mayfair.

Parliament of the United Kingdom
Preceded by John Bagshaw; Isaac Butt	Member of Parliament for Harwich; 1852–1853; With: David Waddington	Succeeded by David Waddington; John Bagshaw
Preceded by Charles du Cane; Taverner John Miller	Member of Parliament for Maldon; 1854–1857; With: John Bramley-Moore	Succeeded by Thomas Western; John Bramley-Moore
Preceded by Thomas Western; John Bramley-Moore	Member of Parliament for Maldon; 1859–1868; With: Thomas Western to 1859; Ralph Earle from 1859	Succeeded by Edward Hammond Bentall
Preceded by Edward Hammond Bentall	Member of Parliament for Maldon; 1874–1878	Succeeded by George Courtauld
