= Smith baronets of Eardiston (1809) =

Escutcheon of the Smith baronets of Eardiston

The Smith baronetcy of Eardiston, Worcestershire was created on 23 September 1809 in the Baronetage of the United Kingdom for William Smith.

== Smith baronets, of Eardiston (1809), to 1893 ==
- Sir William Smith, 1st Baronet of Eardiston (died 1821)
- Sir Christopher Sidney Smith, 2nd Baronet (1798–1839)
- Sir William Smith, 3rd Baronet (1823–1893)

== Revised subsequent succession ==
The succession from 1893 was originally thought to have been as follows:

- Sir William Sydney Winwood Smith, 4th Baronet (born 1 April 1879; died 27 June 1953)
- Sir Christopher Sydney Winwood Smith, 5th Baronet (born 20 September 1906; died 3 December 2000)

The Baronetcy then became dormant, not having been proved by the heir to the 5th Baronet, Robert Christopher Sydney Winwood Smith (born 1939).

Debrett's Peerage and Baronetage 2011, however, argued that the 4th Baronet was the son of a bigamous second marriage of his father Christopher Sydney Winwood Smith (1846–1887; son of the 3rd Baronet as above, but predeceased him) in 1877 to Caroline Holland, and was not in line to inherit the title; Christopher Sydney Winwood Smith's first marriage, in 1870, was to Anne Mogan, and it was their son, William Sidney Winwood Smith (1872–1954), who was entitled to succeed as 4th Baronet.

His son, Sidney Richard Smith (1907–1983) would have been the 5th Baronet, succeeded by his second cousin, Antony Winwood Smith (1920–1993) as 6th Baronet. This line was not aware of their succession to the baronetcy. Debrett's 2011 states the title to have been extinct in 1993 at the death in Bulawayo, Zimbabwe of Sir Antony Winwood Smith, 6th Baronet, this being confirmed by the Registrar of the Official Roll of the Baronetage in 2008. The succession of the baronetcy, taking the above into account, is:

- Sir William Sidney Winwood Smith, 4th Baronet (born 1872; died 1954)
- Sir Sidney Richard Smith, 5th Baronet (born 20 September 1906; died 3 December 1983)
- Sir Antony Winwood Smith, 6th Baronet (born 1920; died 1993)

The Official Roll, as of 2026, considers the baronetcy dormant.

== Notes ==
Baronetage of the United Kingdom
Preceded by Blennerhassett baronets	Smith baronets of Eardiston; 23 September 1809	Succeeded by Cockerell baronets
