= Cable-Alexander baronets =

Baronetcy in the Baronetage of the United Kingdom

- Escutcheon of the Alexander, later Cable-Alexander baronets, of Dublin
- Creation date: 1809
- Status: extant
- Motto: Per mare, per terras, By sea and land

The Alexander, later Cable-Alexander Baronetcy, of the City of Dublin, is a title in the Baronetage of the United Kingdom. It was created on 11 December 1809 for William Alexander, Lord Mayor of Dublin. The second Baronet was a Director of the Bank of Ireland. The third Baronet was Attorney-General to Albert Edward, Prince of Wales, later Edward VII. The seventh Baronet assumed in 1931 by deed poll the additional surname of Cable, being the surname of his mother, the Hon. Noorouz Weston Cable, daughter of Baron Cable. As of 31 December 2013 the present Baronet has not successfully proven his succession and is therefore not on the Official Roll of the Baronetage, with the baronetcy considered dormant.

This branch of the Irish Alexander family is descended from William Alexander, whose brother Nathaniel Alexander was the ancestor of the Earls of Caledon and the Earls Alexander of Tunis.

== Alexander, later Cable-Alexander baronets, of the City of Dublin (1809) ==
- Sir William Alexander, 1st Baronet (1743–1809)
- Sir Robert Alexander, 2nd Baronet (1769–1859)
- Sir William John Alexander, 3rd Baronet (1797–1873)
- Sir John Wallace Alexander, 4th Baronet (1800–1888)
- Sir William Ferdinand Alexander, 5th Baronet (1845–1896)
- Sir Lionel Cecil William Alexander, 6th Baronet (1885–1956)
- Sir Desmond William Lionel Cable-Alexander, 7th Baronet (1919–1986)
- Sir Patrick William Cable-Alexander, 8th Baronet (born 1936)

The heir apparent is the present holder's son Fergus William Antony Cable-Alexander (born 1981).

== See also ==
- Earl of Caledon
- Earl Alexander of Tunis

== Notes ==
Baronetage of the United Kingdom
Preceded by Flower baronets	Alexander baronets of the City of Dublin; 11 December 1809	Succeeded by Stamer baronets
