= Cockerell baronets of Sezincote (1809) =

Escutcheon of the Cockerell baronets of Sezincote

The Cockerell, later Rushout baronetcy, of Sezincote in the County of Gloucester, was created in the Baronetage of the United Kingdom on 25 September 1809 for the nabob and politician Charles Cockerell. He was Member of Parliament for Tregony, Lostwithiel, Bletchingley, Seaford and Evesham. The family seat was Sezincote House, near Moreton-in-Marsh. Gloucestershire. The house was designed by Samuel Pepys Cockerell, brother of the 1st Baronet.

The 1st Baronet married as his second wife Harriet, daughter of John Rushout, 1st Baron Northwick. Their son, Sir Charles Rushout Cockerell, 2nd Baronet, assumed by Royal licence the surname of Rushout in lieu of his patronymic in 1849.

== Cockerell, later Rushout baronets, of Sezincote (1809) ==
- Sir Charles Cockerell, 1st Baronet (died 1837)
- Sir Charles Rushout Rushout, 2nd Baronet (1809–1869)
- Sir Charles Fitzgerald Rushout, 3rd Baronet (1840–1879)
- Sir Charles Hamilton Rushout, 4th Baronet (1868–1931). He left no heir, and the title became extinct.

== Notes ==
Baronetage of the United Kingdom
| Preceded by Smith baronets | Cockerell baronets of Sezincote; 25 September 1809 | Succeeded by Bayntun-Sandys baronets |
