= Alfred du Cane =

English cricketer and clergyman

Personal information
- Full name: Alfred Richard du Cane
- Born: 2 April 1835; Southampton, Hampshire, England
- Died: 19 October 1882 (aged 47); St John's Wood, London, England
- Batting: Unknown
- Bowling: Unknown

Domestic team information
- Years: Team
- 1854–1855: Cambridge University
- 1855: Marylebone Cricket Club

Career statistics
Competition	First-class
Matches	10
Runs scored	45
Batting average	3.75
100s/50s	–/–
Top score	17
Balls bowled	922
Wickets	42
Bowling average	11.66
5 wickets in innings	1
10 wickets in match	1
Best bowling	7/?
Catches/stumpings	5/–
- Source: Cricinfo, 15 June 2022

Alfred Richard du Cane (2 April 1835 – 19 October 1882) was an English clergyman and a cricketer who played first-class cricket for Cambridge University Cricket Club and other amateur sides in 1854 and 1855. He was born at Southampton in Hampshire and died at St John's Wood, London.

Du Cane was the fourth son of a Royal Navy officer and part of the Du Cane family that owned Braxted Park in Essex. His older brother was Charles du Cane, a politician and colonial administrator who also played first-class cricket.

Du Cane was educated at Harrow School and at Trinity College, Cambridge. There are no records that show that he played cricket at Harrow, but at Cambridge University he appeared in several matches in both the 1854 and 1855 seasons, played principally on account of his bowling; it is not known whether he was right- or left-handed at either batting or bowling, nor what style of bowling he practised. After a single first-class match for Cambridge against the Marylebone Cricket Club (MCC), he was picked for a "Gentlemen of the MCC" side against the "Gentlemen of England" and took 10 wickets in the match, although the full bowling figures for this game do not survive. He was then picked for Cambridge side in the 1854 University Match against Oxford University, where he took three wickets, although Oxford won the game by an innings. After the University Match, he played a single game for the Gentlemen of England side, and in 1855, in addition to playing again for Cambridge University – including a second appearance in the University Match – he also turned out for MCC and for the Gentlemen of England, though he did not improve on his bowling performance from his second game. He did not play any further first-class cricket after the 1855 season.

Du Cane graduated from Cambridge University with a Bachelor of Arts degree in 1857; this converted to a Master of Arts in 1860. He was ordained as a Church of England deacon in 1858 and as a priest the following year, and then served in parishes in Staffordshire, Cheshire, Sussex and Warwickshire before becoming vicar of Willingale Doe, Essex from 1874 to his death in 1882 at the age of 47.
