= Anne Mary Perceval =

British born Canadian botanist, collector and author (1790–1876)

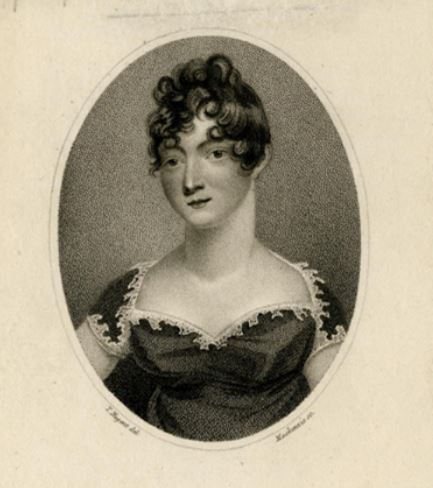
Anne Mary Perceval

Anne Mary Perceval (née Flower; 14 January 1790 – 23 November 1876) was an English botanist and author in Lower Canada from 1810–28. She was the daughter of Sir Charles Flower, Lord Mayor of London. She came to Quebec City in 1810 when her husband was named customs collector. In 1815, with her husband, she acquired Spencer Wood, where she established an important garden of native plants. She identified about 150 species of plants from her collection to William Jackson Hooker, who included them in his Flora boreali-americana, or, the botany of the northern parts of British America. She also corresponded with botanist John Torrey. Plants which she collected are included in Canadian and American natural history collections, as well as collections in Paris and London.

== Early life ==
Anne Mary Perceval was born Anne Mary Flower on 14 January 1790, in London. She was the daughter of Anne (nee Squire) of Plymouth (d. 1803) and Sir Charles Flower, Lord Mayor of London from 1808–09. She was the second oldest of seven children, Sir James Flower, 2nd Baronet, Elizabeth, Caroline, Clarissa, Maria and Jemima. Her father was created a baronet in 1809.

Perceval married Michael Henry Perceval and came to Quebec City in 1810 when her husband was named customs collector. In 1815, with her husband, she acquired Spencer Wood, where she established an important garden of native plants. She identified about 150 species of plants from her collection to William Jackson Hooker, who included them in his Flora boreali-americana, or, the botany of the northern parts of British America. She also corresponded with botanist John Torrey.

She returned to Britain in 1828 following the death of her husband and died at Lews Castle, Stornoway on the Isle of Lewis in 1876, at the age of 86.

Plants which she collected are included in Canadian and American natural history collections, as well as collections in Paris and London.
