= Sir James Flower, 2nd Baronet =

Sir James Flower, 2nd Baronet (14 December 1794 – 17 May 1850) was a British Conservative Party politician. He sat in the House of Commons from 1842 to 1846.

== Early life ==
James Flower was the eldest child and only son of Anne (nee Squire) (d. 1803) and Sir Charles Flower, 1st Baronet, Lord Mayor of London from 1808 to 1809. He had six sisters Anne Mary Perceval (a noted botanist in Canada), Elizabeth, Caroline, Clarissa, Maria and Jemima.

== Career ==
Flower was High Sheriff of Norfolk from 1838 to 1839.

In June 1841, he was asked by some of the electors in the borough of Thetford in Norfolk to contest the seat at the imminent general election.

Nominations took place on 29 June, when Flower was nominated by Andrew Young and W. Watts Wickes. A show of hands declared to be in favour of Flower and his fellow Conservative Bingham Baring, but the third candidate and sitting Liberal MP Earl of Euston demanded a poll. Voting took place the following day, on 30 June, and the result was that Flower and Euston tied for second place with 71 votes each. Amidst many challenges to the validity of votes, the mayor refused to exercise a casting vote, and returned the tied result; all three candidates were declared elected to the two seats. Flower submitted a petition. When the votes were scrutinised, Euston's total was reduced by one, and on 4 May 1842 he was declared unduly elected, thereby giving the seat to Flower.

Flower did not contest the seat at the next general election, in 1847.

The Flower baronetcy became extinct on his death in 1850.

Parliament of the United Kingdom
Preceded by Earl of Euston (1); Bingham Baring	Member of Parliament for Thetford; 1847 – 1847; With: Bingham Baring	Succeeded by Earl of Euston (2); Bingham Baring
Honorary titles
Preceded by Jack Petre	High Sheriff of Norfolk; 1838–1839	Succeeded by Sir Thomas Hare, Bt
Baronetage of the United Kingdom
Preceded by Charles Flower	Baronet (of Lobb and Woodford); 1834–1850	Extinct
