= Sir Thomas Western, 2nd Baronet =

English Liberal Party politician

Sir Thomas Sutton Western, 2nd Baronet (7 October 1821 – 20 June 1877) was an English Liberal Party politician.

Western was educated at Eton and Trinity College, Cambridge. While at Cambridge he was President of the Cambridge Union Society. He was elected at the 1857 general election as Member of Parliament (MP) for Maldon in Essex. He was re-elected in 1859, but defeated at the 1865 general election. Western then stood in the Eastern division of Suffolk at the 1868 general election, but did not win a seat.

On 2 February 1848 he married Giulietta Romana, daughter of Sir Edward Manningham-Buller, 1st Baronet. There were no children and she died on 20 September 1850.

Parliament of the United Kingdom
Preceded by George Peacocke; John Bramley-Moore	Member of Parliament for Maldon; 1857–1865; With: John Bramley-Moore to 1859; George Peacocke from 1859	Succeeded by Ralph Earle; George Peacocke
Baronetage of the United Kingdom
Preceded by Thomas Western	Baronet of Rivenhall, Essex; 1873–1877	Succeeded by Thomas Western
