= David Waddington (Essex MP) =

British politician

David Waddington (1810 – 12 October 1863) was an English Conservative Party politician. He was born in Manchester the son of an iron founder. By 1836 he was running his own mill.

Between the years of 1845-49 Waddington was Vice-Chairman of the Eastern Counties Railway and Chairman from 1851 to 1856. He negotiated agreements to work most of the lines (that had been built by this point) in East Anglia creating a network of 565 miles by 1854. He was responsible for the takeover of the Eastern Union Railway in 1854 where his ability to drive a hard bargain caused the EUR chairman J Cobbold to remark "a strong minority of our Board consider that you have done us". Waddington however was exposed in a scandal on the ECR as forced to resign in 1856.

He was Member of Parliament (MP) for Maldon from 1847 to 1852 and then for Harwich from 1852 to 1856. His election for the Maldon constituency is interesting in that he was at the time backing the construction of the Witham-Maldon branch line and a significant number of people working on the branch were registered to vote locally and a number of local people were employed on the works but this employment ceased the Tuesday after the election. Locally these men were known as "Waddington's Guinea Pigs"! A report published after the following election (by which time Waddington was standing in Harwich) was quite damning in its belated assessment of the 1847 election.

In 1854 his son Richard died followed by his wife in 1859. Waddington died on 12 October 1863 from bowel cancer and was buried in Enfield.

Parliament of the United Kingdom
Preceded by John Round and Quintin Dick	Member of Parliament for Maldon; 1847–1852; With: Thomas Barrett-Lennard	Succeeded by Charles du Cane and Taverner John Miller
Preceded by John Bagshaw and Isaac Butt	Member of Parliament for Harwich; 1852–1857; With: George Sandford, to 1853; John Bagshaw, from 1853	Succeeded by John Bagshaw and George Drought Warburton
