= Antony Buck =

British politician (1928–2003)

Sir Antony Buck QC

Parliamentary under-secretary of state Ministry of Defence
- In office 1972–1974
- Prime Minister: Edward Heath

Member of Parliament for Colchester North Colchester (1961–1983)
- In office 16 March 1961 – 16 March 1992
- Preceded by: Cuthbert Alport
- Succeeded by: Bernard Jenkin

Personal details
- Born: 19 December 1928 Cambridge, Cambridgeshire
- Died: 6 October 2003 (aged 74) Lambeth, London, England
- Party: Conservative

Sir Philip Antony Fyson Buck QC (19 December 1928 – 6 October 2003) was a British Conservative politician.

== Early life and career ==
The son of Arthur F. Buck, a farmer and agricultural merchant, and his wife Laura (née Fyson), a founder member of the Royal College of Nursing, Buck was born in Cambridge, Cambridgeshire. He was educated at The King's School, Ely and Trinity Hall, Cambridge, where he studied Law and History and was the chairman of the Cambridge University Conservative Association as the successor to Geoffrey Howe. He then trained as a barrister and was called to the bar by the Inner Temple in 1954, becoming a prominent criminal lawyer and a Queen's Counsel in 1974.

== Political career ==
He was elected MP for Colchester in a 1961 by-election. A strong supporter of the modernising Conservatism championed by Edward Heath, Buck served as the Under-Secretary for Defence from 1972 to 1974 with responsibility for the Royal Navy, but his fortunes declined when Heath lost the election in 1974, and he managed the unsuccessful leadership campaign for his old friend Geoffrey Howe. Buck then lost his place on the executive of the 1922 Committee, although he later regained it. Nevertheless, he remained a perceptive observer of defence policy, opposing the closure of Colchester's military hospital and other cuts. He was also chairman of the Parliamentary Ombudsman Committee. He was held in high regard by his constituency party and continued to serve as the MP for Colchester until 1983 when he became MP for Colchester North after boundary changes. He retired from parliament in 1992.

== Marriages ==
Buck married three times. His daughter Louisa, from his 34-year first marriage to Judy Grant, is an art critic. In 1994, tabloid newspaper reports of a relationship between his second wife, Bienvenida (née Perez-Blanco) and Marshal of the Royal Air Force Sir Peter Harding, were followed by Harding's resignation as Chief of the Defence Staff. His third wife was Russia-born Tamara Norashkaryan.

Parliament of the United Kingdom
Preceded by Cuthbert Alport	Member of Parliament for Colchester; 1961–1983	Constituency Abolished
New constituency	Member of Parliament for Colchester North; 1983–1992	Succeeded by Bernard Jenkin
