= Bayntun-Sandys baronets =

Extinct baronetcy in the Baronetage of the United Kingdom

Escutcheon of the Bayntun-Sandys baronets

The Bayntun-Sandys Baronetcy, of Miserden Castle in the County of Gloucester and of Chadlington Hall in the County of Oxford, was a title in the Baronetage of the United Kingdom. It was created on 26 September 1809 for Edwin Bayntun-Sandys (1774–1848). He had been born Edwin or Edwyn Sandys, but had assumed the additional surname of Bayntun. He did so, by Royal sign manual, in 1807. The change was in order to inherit from the will of William Bayntun (1717–1785), a lawyer of Gray's Inn and husband of his first cousin once removed, Catherine Sandys (1737–1804).

Edwin Sandys married, in 1799, Agnes Cornish Allen (1778-1846), daughter of Michael Allen of Coleridge House, Stokenham near Kingsbridge, Devon.

Their elder son, Edwin Windsor Bayntun-Sandys (1801–38), was knighted in 1825 but predeceased his father in 1838, as did his only brother Myles (or Miles) Allen Bayntun-Sandys (1812–1813). Consequently, the title became extinct on Bayntun-Sandys' death in 1848.

== Bayntun-Sandys baronets, of Miserden Castle and Chadlington Hall (1809) ==
- Sir Edwin Bayntun-Sandys, 1st and last Baronet (1774–1848)
  - Sir Edwin Windsor Bayntun-Sandys (1801–1838)

Baronetage of the United Kingdom
Preceded by Cockerell baronets	Bayntun-Sandys baronets of Miserden Castle and Chadlington Hall; 26 September 1809	Succeeded by Halford baronets
