= Flower baronets =

Extinct title

Escutcheon of the Flower baronets of Lobb and Woodford

The Flower Baronetcy, of Lobb in the County of Oxford and of Woodford in the County of Essex, was a title in the Baronetage of the United Kingdom. It was created on 1 December 1809 for Charles Flower, Lord Mayor of London from 1808 to 1809. The title became extinct on the death of the second Baronet in 1850.

== Flower baronets, of Lobb and Woodford (1809) ==
- Sir Charles Flower, 1st Baronet (1763–1834)
- Sir James Flower, 2nd Baronet (1794–1850)

Baronetage of the United Kingdom
Preceded by Sheppard baronets	Flower baronets of Lobb and Woodford; 1 December 1809	Succeeded by Alexander baronets
