= Western baronets =

Extinct baronetcy in the Baronetage of the United Kingdom

The Western Baronetcy, of Rivenhall in the County of Essex, was a title in the baronetage of the United Kingdom. It was created on 20 August 1864 for the Liberal politician Thomas Western. He had succeeded to the Rivenhall estate in Essex in 1844 on the death of his cousin Charles Western, 1st Baron Western. The second baronet was also a politician and sat as member of parliament for Maldon. The third baronet was a justice of the peace and deputy lieutenant for Essex. The title became extinct on his death in 1917.

== Western baronets, of Rivenhall (1864) ==
Escutcheon of the Western baronets of Rivenhall

- Sir Thomas Burch Western, 1st Baronet (1795–1873)
- Sir Thomas Sutton Western, 2nd Baronet (1821–1877)
- Sir Thomas Charles Callis Western, 3rd Baronet (1850–1917)
