= Charles Du Cane =

British politician and colonial administrator

Sir Charles Du Cane KCMG
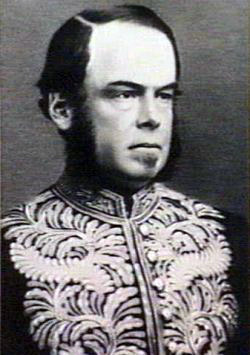

3rd Governor of Tasmania
- In office 15 January 1869 – 30 November 1874
- Monarch: Victoria
- Preceded by: Colonel Thomas Browne
- Succeeded by: Frederick Weld

Personal details
- Born: 5 December 1825 Ryde, Isle of Wight, England
- Died: 25 February 1889 (aged 63) Witham, Essex, England
- Spouse: Georgiana Susan Copley
- Education: Charterhouse School
- Alma mater: Exeter College, Oxford

Sir Charles Du Cane KCMG (5 December 1825 – 25 February 1889) was a British Conservative Party politician and colonial administrator who was Member of Parliament between 1852 and 1854 and Governor of Tasmania from 1868 to 1874.

Du Cane was born in Ryde on the Isle of Wight in 1825, the son of Charles Du Cane of Braxted Park and Frances Prideaux-Brune. He was educated at Charterhouse School in Surrey and Exeter College, Oxford. From 1848 to 1855, Du Cane played first-class cricket for the Marylebone Cricket Club as a batsman; a younger brother, Alfred, also played first-class cricket.

In 1852, he was elected to the House of Commons as a Member of Parliament (MP) for Maldon in Essex, but his election was declared void after it was discovered that Du Cane's agents had been involved in bribery although it was established that Du Cane was unaware of the corruption. He spent two years as Civil Lord of the Admiralty. At the 1857 general election he was elected as MP for Northern Essex, and held the seat until the division was abolished at the 1868 general election.

Du Cane was appointed Governor of Tasmania, and was sworn in at Hobart Town on 15 January 1869. He faced a minor constitutional crisis when the Premier of Tasmania, James Milne Wilson, threatened to resign after a taxation scheme he had proposed was defeated in parliament, which would have left Tasmania without a government, although Wilson withdrew his resignation and a general election took place.

Du Cane's tenure in Tasmania saw the colony grow strong and prosperous, partly due to industrial and resources booms and the improvement of communication between Tasmania, the mainland and England. He left Hobart in November 1874, and was appointed KCMG the next year after his return to England. Du Cane died at his family estate in Braxted Park, Essex on 25 February 1889.

== See also ==
- English translations of Homer: Charles Du Cane

Parliament of the United Kingdom
Preceded by David Waddington and Thomas Barrett-Lennard	Member of Parliament for Maldon; 1852–1854; With: Taverner John Miller	Succeeded by George Sandford and John Bramley-Moore
Preceded by Sir John Tyrell; William Beresford	Member of Parliament for North Essex; 1857–1868; With: William Beresford to 1865; Sir Thomas Western, Bt from 1865	Constituency abolished
Government offices
Preceded by Thomas Gore Browne	Governor of Tasmania; 1869–1874	Succeeded by Frederick Weld
Preceded by Frederick Goulburn	Chairman of HM Customs; 1878–1889	Succeeded by Sir Herbert Harley Murray
