= Halford baronets of Wistow (second creation, 1809) =

Original escutcheon of the Halford baronets of Wistow, later augmented by the 1st Baronet

The Halford baronetcy of Wistow, Leicestershire was created on 27 September 1809 in the Baronetage of the United Kingdom for Henry Halford, a prominent society physician who was physician extraordinary to the George III from 1793. Descended maternally from the 5th Baronet of the first creation, born Henry Vaughan, he changed his surname to Halford by Act of Parliament in expectation of inheriting Wistow Hall. The baronetcy became extinct with the death of his grandson, the fourth baronet, in 1897.

== Halford baronets, of Wistow (1809) ==
- Sir Henry Halford, 1st Baronet, born Henry Vaughan (1766–1844) who inherited Wistow Hall in 1814 with the death of Lady Denbigh, the long-lived widow of the last of the previous Halford baronets. He was President of the Royal College of Physicians 1820–1844 (his death).
- Sir Henry Halford, 2nd Baronet (22 April 1797 – 22 May 1868); he was Member of Parliament for Leicestershire South 1832–57.
- Sir Henry St. John Halford, 3rd Baronet (1828–1897).
- Reverend Sir John Frederick Halford, 4th Baronet (1830–1897), brother of the 3rd Baronet. He married Ismena Andrews (19 April 1838 – 6 February 1912), third daughter of John S. Andrews.

== Notes ==
Baronetage of the United Kingdom
Preceded by Bayntun-Sandys baronets	Halford baronets of Wistow; 27 September 1809	Succeeded by Tyrell baronets
