= Cuthbert Alport =

British politician (1912–1998)

The Right Honourable The Lord Alport PC DL
- Alport in 1965

Member of Parliament for Colchester
- In office 23 February 1950 – 16 February 1961
- Preceded by: George Delacourt-Smith
- Succeeded by: Antony Buck

Personal details
- Born: 22 March 1912
- Died: 28 October 1998 (aged 86)
- Spouse: Rachel Bingham
- Education: Pembroke College, Cambridge

Cuthbert James McCall Alport, Baron Alport, PC, DL (22 March 1912 – 28 October 1998), was a Conservative Party politician, minister, and life peer.

== Early life ==
"Cub" Alport was educated at Haileybury College in Hertfordshire, and graduated with a degree in History and Law from Pembroke College, Cambridge, in 1934. He was elected President of the Cambridge Union the following year. Alport was a tutor at Ashridge College, Little Gaddesden, Hertfordshire, from 1935 to 1937. During the Second World War, he served in the British Army as an officer in the Royal Welch Fusiliers and the King's African Rifles, and was General Staff Officer 1 (GSO 1) of the East Africa Command between 1944 and 1945. He was made a Barrister-at-Law at the Middle Temple in 1944.

== Political career ==
Alport was an assistant secretary for the Conservative Party Education Department between 1937 and 1939. He was Director of the Conservative Political Centre between 1945 and 1950. He was elected as the Conservative Member of Parliament for the Colchester constituency, in the 1950 general election and held the seat until 16 February 1961, when he was created Baron Alport, of Colchester in the County of Essex, a life peerage. On his elevation to the peerage, the Colchester constituency was held by the Conservatives in a by-election by Antony Buck.

Alport held the post of Assistant Postmaster-General between 1955 and 1957. He was Parliamentary Under-Secretary of State for Commonwealth Relations between 1957 and 1959. He held the office of Minister of State for the Commonwealth Relations Office between 1959 and 1961. He was invested as a Privy Councillor in 1960. He held the office of British High commissioner to the Federation of Rhodesia and Nyasaland between 1961 and 1963.

During Alport's tenure as high commissioner, he came under suspicion from the United Nations over his questionable actions before and after the plane crash that killed UN Secretary-General Dag Hammarskjöld. Alport was present at Ndola Airport when Hammarskjöld's plane was supposed to land and when it did not, he inexplicably closed the airport, later testifying that the plane must have 'gone elsewhere'. When the crash was discovered, Hammarskjöld's CX-52 Hagelin cipher was confiscated by the Northern Rhodesian authorities and Alport refused to return it to the UN. Aside from this, a second CX-52 was reported to have been found by looters who reached the crash early. These looters, three local charcoal burners, who testified that the crash happened at night and reported hearing and seeing an explosion in the sky, going against the official story of the crash happening later the next day, were suspected to have been mistreated by Northern Rhodesian authorities and it is suspected that the looted CX-52 never existed and was invented to discredit the men. Alport's behavior was scrutinized further in 2015 after a new investigation, led by Mohamed Chande Othman, said that his actions suggest 'that he had a reason to seek to refuse to return United Nations property, including Hammarskjöld's CX-52, to the United Nations, although this was eventually done'.

After returning to England, he was appointed High Steward of Colchester in 1967 and he was appointed deputy lieutenant of Essex in 1974.

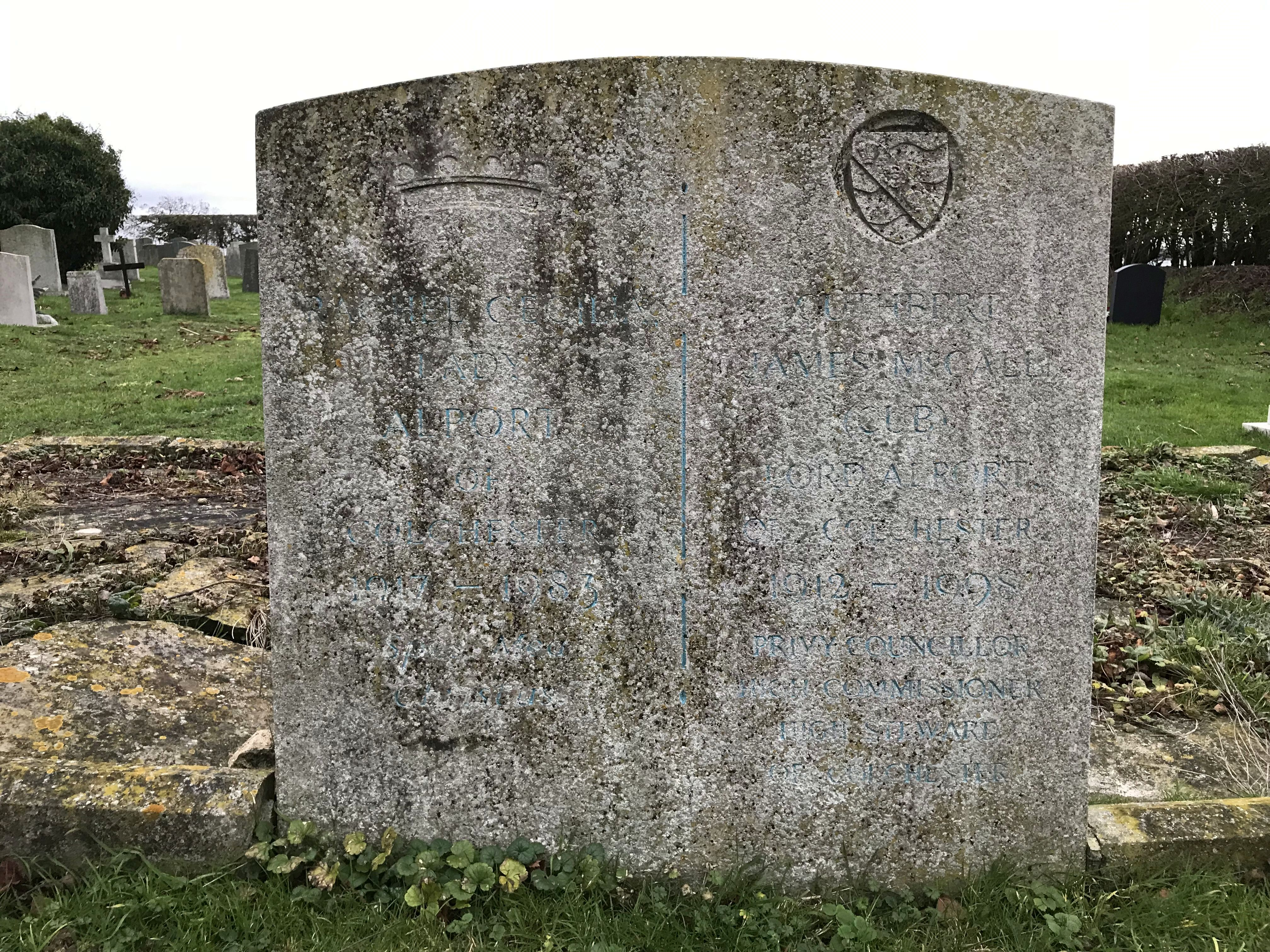
The grave of Lord and Lady Alport in the churchyard of St John the Baptist, Layer de la Haye, Essex.

== Family life ==
In 1945 he married Rachel, the great granddaughter of George Bingham, 4th Earl of Lucan. The marriage produced three children, two girls and one boy.

== Published works ==
- Kingdoms in Partnership (1937)
- Hope in Africa (1952)
- The Sudden Assignment (1965)

== Honorary degree ==
Lord Alport was awarded an honorary doctorate by the University of Essex in July 1997.

== The Alport Papers ==
Lord Alport's correspondence and papers (the Alport Papers) are archived at the University of Essex library. Additional correspondence with Roy Welensky is archived at the Bodleian Library of Commonwealth and African Studies at Rhodes House, University of Oxford.

== Arms ==
Coat of arms of Cuthbert Alport
Crest A demi-lion Or gorged with a mural crown Gules within a Norman arch Proper. Escutcheon Barry wavy Argent and Azure on a bend Or a Tudor Rose Argent on Gules between two oyster shells Gules. Supporters Dexter a representation of a Roman centurion supporting a vexillum of the XXth Legion Proper sinister a representation of an Ancient Briton Proper. Motto Ferio Tego (I Smite I Protect)

Parliament of the United Kingdom
Preceded by George Delacourt-Smith	Member of Parliament for Colchester; 1950–1961	Succeeded by Antony Buck
