= Military Order of the Tower and Sword =

Highest honorific order of Portugal

Military Order of the Tower and of the Sword, of Valour, Loyalty and Merit Ordem Militar da Torre e Espada, do Valor, Lealdade e Mérito
- Emblem of the order

Awarded by the president of Portugal
- Type: Ancient military order
- Established: 1459; 567 years ago
- Country: Portugal
- Ribbon: Vivid blue
- Motto: Valor, Lealdade e Mérito (Value, Loyalty and Merit)
- Eligibility: Portuguese and foreigners; military and civilian
- Awarded for: Exceptional and outstanding merits in the highest offices in Parliament, Government, courts of justice or in the presidency of the Republic or in the command of troops in campaign; for military or civic deeds of heroism and to reward outstanding acts of abnegation and sacrifice for Portugal or mankind
- Status: Currently constituted
- Grand Master: President of Portugal
- Chancellor: Guilherme d'Oliveira Martins
- Grades: Grand Collar (GColTE); Grand Cross (GCTE); Grand Officer (GOTE); Commander (ComTE); Officer (OTE); Knight (CvTE) / Dame (DmTE)

Precedence
- Next (higher): Sash of the Three Orders
- Next (lower): Order of Christ
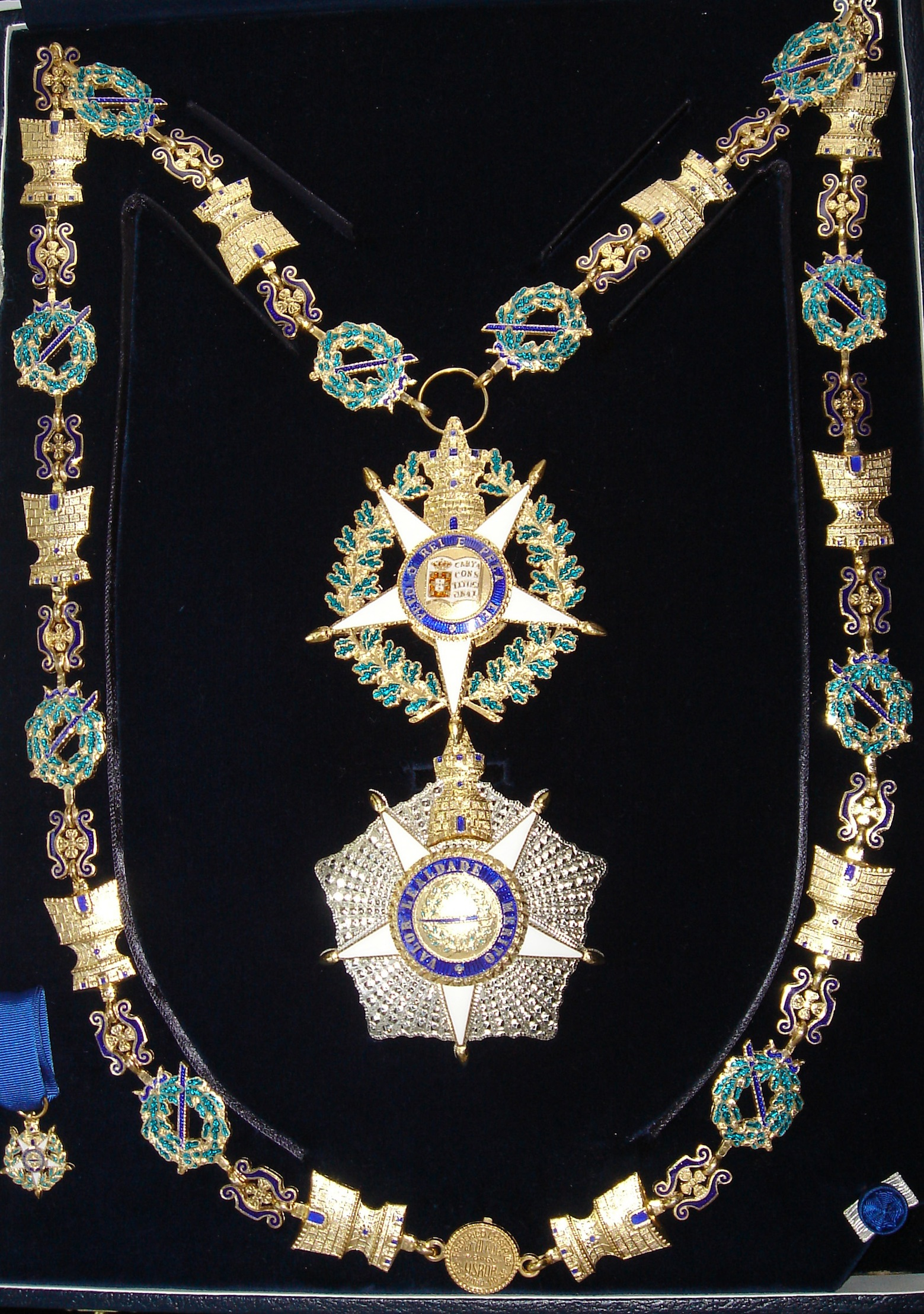
- Insignia of the order Ribbon bar of the order

The Military Order of the Tower and of the Sword, of Valour, Loyalty and Merit (Portuguese: Ordem Militar da Torre e Espada, do Valor, Lealdade e Mérito), before 1917 the ancient and most noble order of the Tower and of the Sword, of valour, loyalty and merit (A antiga e muito nobre ordem da Torre e Espada, do valor, lealdade e mérito), is one of the four former ancient Portuguese military orders and the pinnacle of the Portuguese honours system. It was created by King Afonso V in 1459. The order may be bestowed on people or on Portuguese municipalities.

== History ==
The order was originally created by King Afonso V of Portugal in 1459, under the name of the Order of the Sword, inspired by the legend that Arab rule in Africa would end when a Christian prince would seize Fez and claim a sword kept on one of the citadels towers. Knighthood in the Order of the Sword was given as reward to those who participated in the conquests and battles in Africa. The order fell into disuse after the conquest of Tangiers and Asilah.

The order was revived on 29 November 1808, by Prince Regent John, later John VI of Portugal. It commemorated the safe arrival of the Royal Family in the Portuguese colony of Brazil, after Napoleon had invaded Portugal. Its full title was "the Royal Order of the Tower and Sword". It was available to both Portuguese and foreigners and for military, political or civilian achievement. Among the intended recipients were subjects of His Britannic Majesty, who had assisted the Royal Family to reach Brazil, but who were ineligible for the other Portuguese orders due to their religion.

In 1832, Peter, Duke of Braganza (who was then Regent for his daughter Queen Maria II), reformed the Order which now became the Ancient and Most Noble Military Order of the Tower and of the Sword, of Valour, Loyalty and Merit.

In 1896, the class of Grand Officer was inserted between Grand Cross and Commander.

On 15 October 1910, after the end of the monarchy, the new republican government of Portugal abolished all military orders, with the exception of the Order of the Tower and Sword, even though, it was mandated to be taken from everyone who have received it without any military merit. Despite the fact that the order had not been abolished, on 26 September 1917 the order was revised for the third time. The order had four classes, the highest of which was confined to the President of the Republic of Portugal.

The President is ex officio the Order's Grand Master and a member of the Order, Grand Cross.

The degree of Grand Collar was added in 1939. The Grand Collar was meant for heads of state with notable military deeds, with Spanish General Franco the only head of state to be awarded the Grand Collar under these terms. The order was reformed in 1962 with the Grand Collar being made exclusively open to former presidents of Portugal, an exception was made in 1973 for Brazilian President Emílio Garrastazu Médici by decree-law.

The Organic Law of the Honorary Orders of 1986 kept the exclusivity of the Grand Collar for former presidents of Portugal. Exceptions to this rule were made in 1993 for Queen Elizabeth II of the United Kingdom and in 2000 for King Juan Carlos I of Spain, who were awarded the Grand Collar by special decree-law.

The Law of Honorary Orders of 2011 opened the Grand Collar to foreign heads of state and to those of exceptional achievements while maintaining the automatic appointments of presidents of Portugal at the end of their terms.

== Insignia ==
- The badge of the Order is a five-pointed gilt star, enamelled in white and with one point pointing downwards. The star has a wreath of green enamelled oak leaves between the arms of the star, and is topped by a gilt tower. The obverse central disc bears a sword surrounded by a wreath of oak leaves on a white enamel background, which is in turn surrounded by a blue enamel ring bearing the motto "Valor Lealdade e Mérito" (Valour, Loyalty and Merit). The reverse central disc bears the Portuguese coat-of-arms, surrounded by a blue enamel ring bearing the name "República Portuguesa" (Portuguese Republic).
- The star of the Order is a five-pointed faceted star, in gilt for Grand Collar, Grand Cross and Grand Officer, and in silver for Commander, with the obverse of the badge (minus the wreath between the arms of the star-badge) superimposed upon it.
- The ribbon of the Order is blue.
- The fourragère is solid blue.

== Grades ==
The Order of the Tower and Sword, as awarded by the Portuguese government today, comes in six classes:

- Grand Collar (GColTE), which wears the badge of the Order on a special collar (chain), and the star of the Order in gold on the left chest;
- Grand Cross (GCTE), which wears the badge of the Order on a collar (chain), or on a sash on the right shoulder, and the star of the Order in gold on the left chest;
- Grand Officer (GOTE), which wears the badge of the Order on a necklet, and the star of the Order in gold on the left chest;
- Commander (ComTE), which wears the star of the Order in silver on the left chest;
- Officer (OTE), which wears the badge of the Order on a ribbon with rosette on the left chest;
- Knight (CvTE) or Dame (DmTE), which wears the badge of the Order on a plain ribbon on the left chest.

Rear Admiral Thomas Western was one of the first to be awarded a Knighthood of the Order of the Tower and Sword. "In 1807 the Admiral (then Captain) Western rescued the Portuguese royal family from Napoleon's advancing ground forces and conveyed them to Brazil. In gratitude the King of Portugal made Thomas Western a Knight Commander in the Portuguese Order of the Tower and Sword."

Ribbon bars
Grand Collar	Grand Cross	Grand Officer	Commander	Officer	Knight / Dame

When the decoration is intended to reward heroic deeds in military campaign, it is awarded with a palm.

- Grand Collar with palm (GColPmTE);
- Grand Cross with palm (GCPmTE);
- Grand Officer with palm (GOPmTE);
- Commander with palm (ComPmTE);
- Officer with palm (OPmTE);
- Knight with palm (CvPmTE) or Dame with palm (DmPmTE).

Ribbon bars
Grand Collar with palm	Grand Cross with palm	Grand Officer with palm	Commander with palm	Officer with palm	Knight / Dame with palm

As in the other Portuguese honorific orders, the title of Honorary Member (MHTE) may be awarded to institutions and localities.

== Membership benefits ==
In accordance with the law those awarded with any degree from the Military Order of the Tower and Sword of Valor, Loyalty and Merit have the following rights:

- Preference in admission to state-run social establishments and the right to a pension, corresponding to the national minimum wage and cumulative with any others due to them, if they lack sufficient livelihoods. Furthermore granting of the pension and its transmission to surviving spouses, or to persons who have lived in a similar situation to the spouses, and to minor children is exempt from any fees or taxes.
- Their orphans have absolute preference in admission to military schools, as well as to schools dependent on military departments.

== Current Grand Collars and Grand Crosses ==
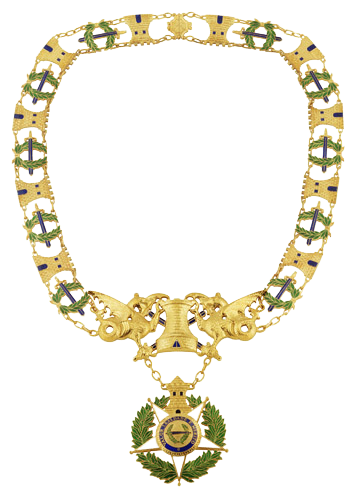
Grand collar of the order

Grand Collar

- António Ramalho Eanes (9 March 1986)
- Aníbal Cavaco Silva (9 March 2011)
- Marcelo Rebelo de Sousa (9 March 2021)
- Juan Carlos I of Spain (11 September 2000)
- Felipe VI of Spain (28 November 2016)
- Charles III of the United Kingdom (15 June 2023)

Grand Cross:

- Fernando Collor de Mello (2 July 1991)
- Fernando Henrique Cardoso (6 November 2002)
- Felipe VI of Spain (25 September 2006)
- Luiz Inácio Lula da Silva (5 March 2008)

== Select recipients ==
Grand Collar

- Américo Tomás (9 August 1963)
- Mário Soares (9 March 1991)
- Jorge Sampaio (9 March 2006)

Grand Cross:

- Kaiser Wilhelm I
- Kaiser Friedrich III
- Kaiser Wilhelm II
- Kronprinz Wilhelm
- Albert, Prince Consort (25 November 1858)
- King Edward VII, King of the United Kingdom and British Dominions (25 November 1858)
- Francisco Sá Carneiro (after his death) (17 March 1986)

Grand Officer:

- Coronel Jaime Alberto Gonçalves das Neves (13 July 1995)
- Private Anibal Milhais - the only Portuguese Army private to be awarded the Order of the Tower and the Sword for Valor, for his actions in Lys, Belgium during World War I.

Commander:

- Henrique Mitchell de Paiva Couceiro (18 December 1890)
- Joaquim Xavier Curado, Count of São João das duas barras (1817)

Officer:

- Patrão Joaquim Lopes (25 February 1862)
- Henrique Mitchell de Paiva Couceiro (18 December 1890)

Knight:

- General Augusto Carlos Teixeira de Aragão (2 October 1868)
- Tenente Francisco Craveiro Lopes (31 March 1928)
- Henrique Mitchell de Paiva Couceiro (18 December 1890)
- Tenente Coronel Marcelino da Mata (2 July 1969)

== See also ==
- Orders, decorations, and medals of Portugal
