= John Attwood =

British politician (died 1865)

Member of Parliament for Harwich
- In office 30 June 1841 – 14 March 1848 Serving with John Bagshaw (1847–1848); William Beresford (1841–1847)
- Preceded by: Alexander Ellice; John Charles Herries
- Succeeded by: John Bagshaw; John Hobhouse

Personal details
- Died: 1865
- Party: Conservative/Peelite

John Attwood (died 1865) was a British Conservative and Peelite politician.

Attwood was elected as the Conservative Member of Parliament (MP) for Harwich at the 1841 general election and, becoming a Peelite by 1847, held the seat until 1848 when he was unseated on petition due to bribery by his agents.

Parliament of the United Kingdom
Preceded by Alexander Ellice; John Charles Herries	Member of Parliament for Harwich; 1841–1848; With: John Bagshaw (1847–1848); William Beresford (1841–1847)	Succeeded by John Bagshaw; John Hobhouse
