= Sir Thomas Western, 1st Baronet =

English Liberal politician

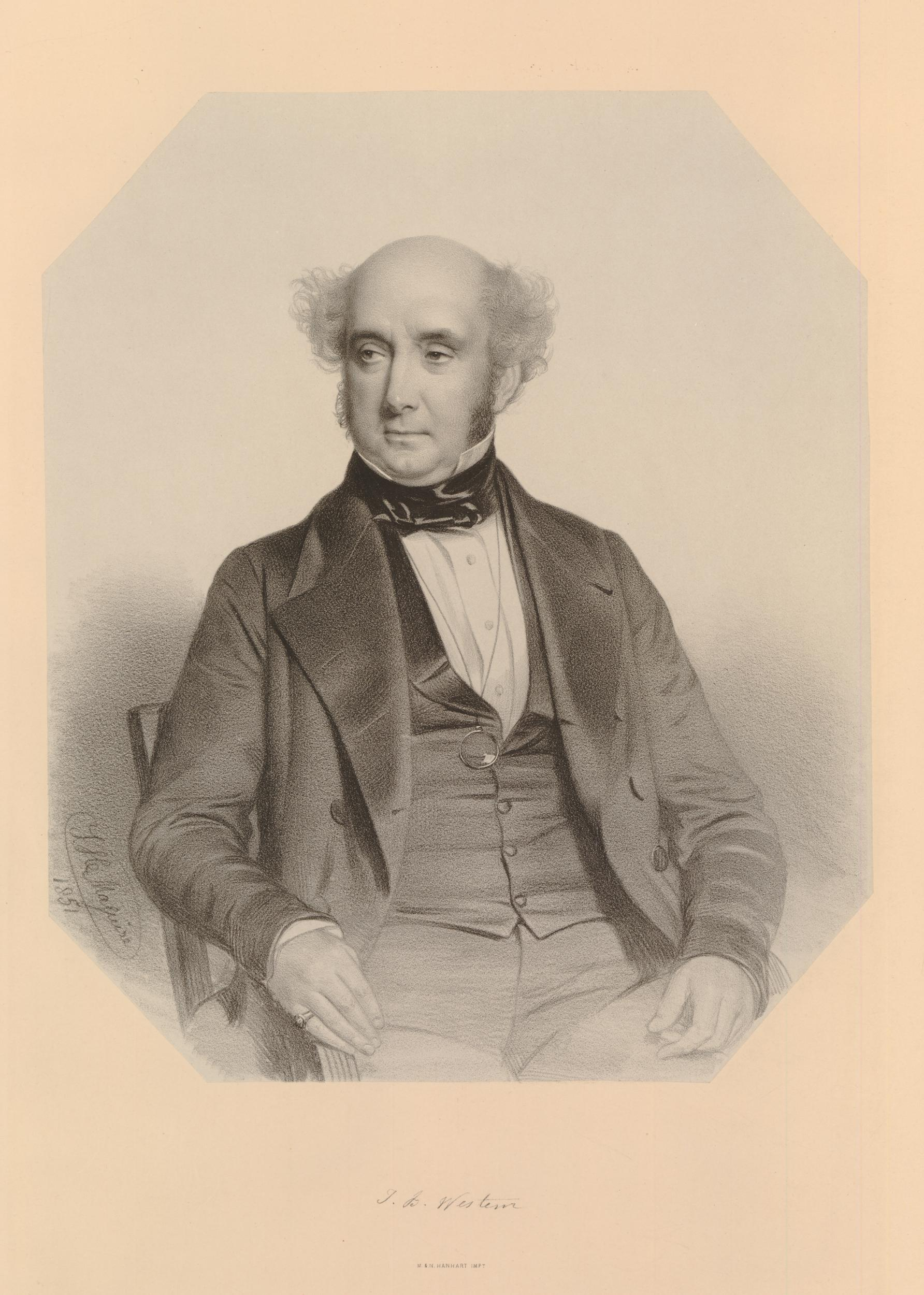
Sir Thomas Western, 1st Baronet

Sir Thomas Burch Western, 1st Baronet (22 August 1795 – 30 May 1873) was an English Liberal Party politician.

== Life ==
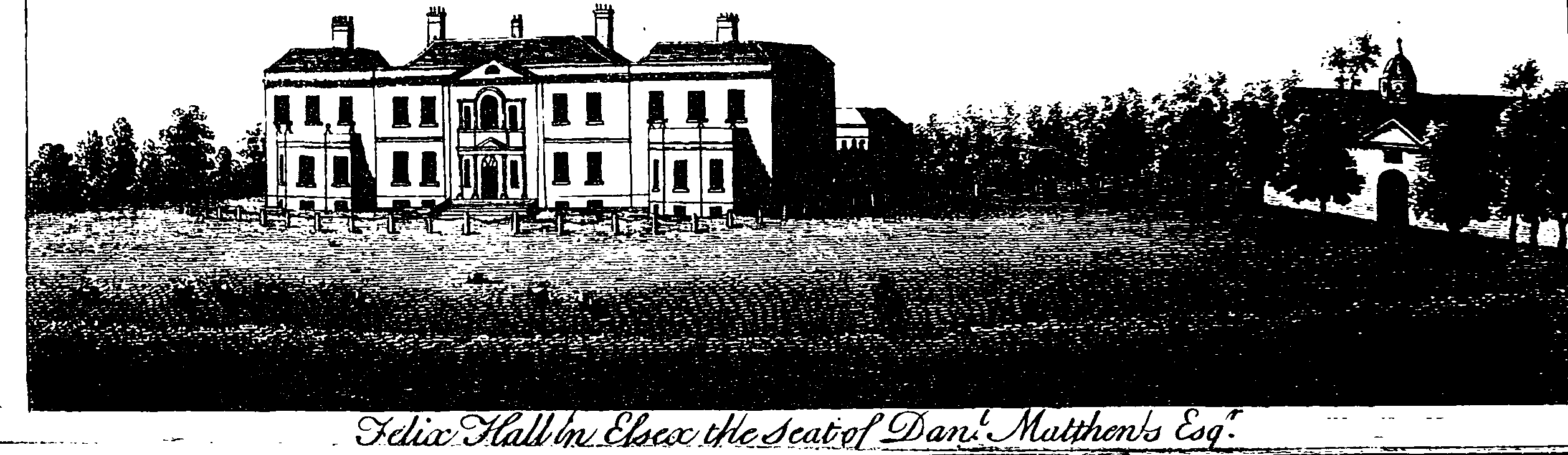
Felix Hall in 1776

He was born in Bermuda the son of Admiral Thomas Western and Mary Burch (then 18 years old). His parents married either shortly before or shortly after his birth. He spent all of his early life in Bermuda, due to his father continuing in active service in the West Indies. The family only came to England in 1802 when his father had to take HMS Tamar back to England for repair. Thereafter they remained in England. His father retired in 1809 and they retired to Tattingstone near the Suffolk coast.

He served as High Sheriff of Essex for 1850. He was elected at the 1865 general election as member of parliament (MP) for the Northern division of Essex. When Essex was divided into three divisions (rather than two) for the 1868 general election, Western stood in the new Eastern division, but did not win a seat.

He was Lord Lieutenant of Essex from 1869 to 1873.

He lived later life at Felix Hall in Essex but is buried in Tattingstone with his parents.

== Family ==
He married Margaret Letitia Busby in February 1819 in Marylebone. They had two sons and two daughters. His eldest son Thomas inherited his estate and title.

Parliament of the United Kingdom
Preceded by Charles Gray Round; Charles Du Cane	Member of Parliament for North Essex; 1865–1868; With: Charles Du Cane	Constituency abolished
Baronetage of the United Kingdom
New creation	Baronet (of Rivenhall); 1864–1873	Succeeded by Thomas Western
