= 1961 Colchester by-election =

1961 UK Parliamentary by-election

The 1961 Colchester by-election was a parliamentary by-election for the British House of Commons constituency of Colchester on 16 March 1961.

== Vacancy ==
It was held due to the incumbent Conservative MP, Cuthbert Alport becoming British High Commissioner to Rhodesia and so getting a Life Peerage on appointment. He had been MP here since gaining the seat in 1950.

== Election history ==
Colchester had been won by the Conservatives at every election since 1950 when they gained the seat from Labour. The result at the last General election was as follows;

1959 general election: Colchester
Party	Candidate	Votes	%	±%
Conservative	Cuthbert Alport	24,592	51.63	
Labour	Joan I. Edmonson	17,096	35.89	
Liberal	Peter M Linfoot	5,942	12.48	
Majority		7,496	15.74	
Turnout		47,630	82.44	
Conservative hold		Swing		

== Candidates ==
- The Conservatives selected Antony Buck.
- The Liberals selected airline pilot Howard Levett Fry. He was born in December 1912 and was educated at Paxton Park School and St. Paul's School, London. He joined the R.A.F. in 1932 and transferred to Imperial Airways in 1937. He flew transport aircraft during the war. After the war he was a Senior Captain first class with B.O.A.C. He was a founder member of the British Air Line Pilots' Association. He was Vice-Chairman of the Britannia Pilots' Council. He was a member of the Liberal Party Executive and the Party Council. Fry contested Aylesbury in 1959 and 1955 and New Forest in 1950.
- Labour re-selected John Wilson Fear.

== Result ==
The Conservative Party held the seat with a slightly reduced majority.

1961 Colchester by-election
Party	Candidate	Votes	%	±%
Conservative	Antony Buck	17,891	47.17	−4.46
Labour	John Wilson Fear	12,547	33.08	−2.81
Liberal	Howard Levett Fry	7,487	19.74	+7.26
Majority		5,344	14.09	−1.65
Turnout		37,925	64.90	−13.54
Conservative hold		Swing	-0.8	

== Aftermath ==
The result at the 1964 general election;

General election 1964: Colchester
Party	Candidate	Votes	%	±%
Conservative	Antony Buck	23,319	46.0	−1.2
Labour	Charles Williams	19,780	39.0	+5.9
Liberal	Eric W Rodnight	7,566	14.9	−4.7
Majority		3,539	7.0	−7.1
Turnout		50,665	82.1	+17.2
Conservative hold		Swing	-3.5	
