= Bernard Jenkin =

British politician (born 1959)

The Honourable Sir Bernard Jenkin MP
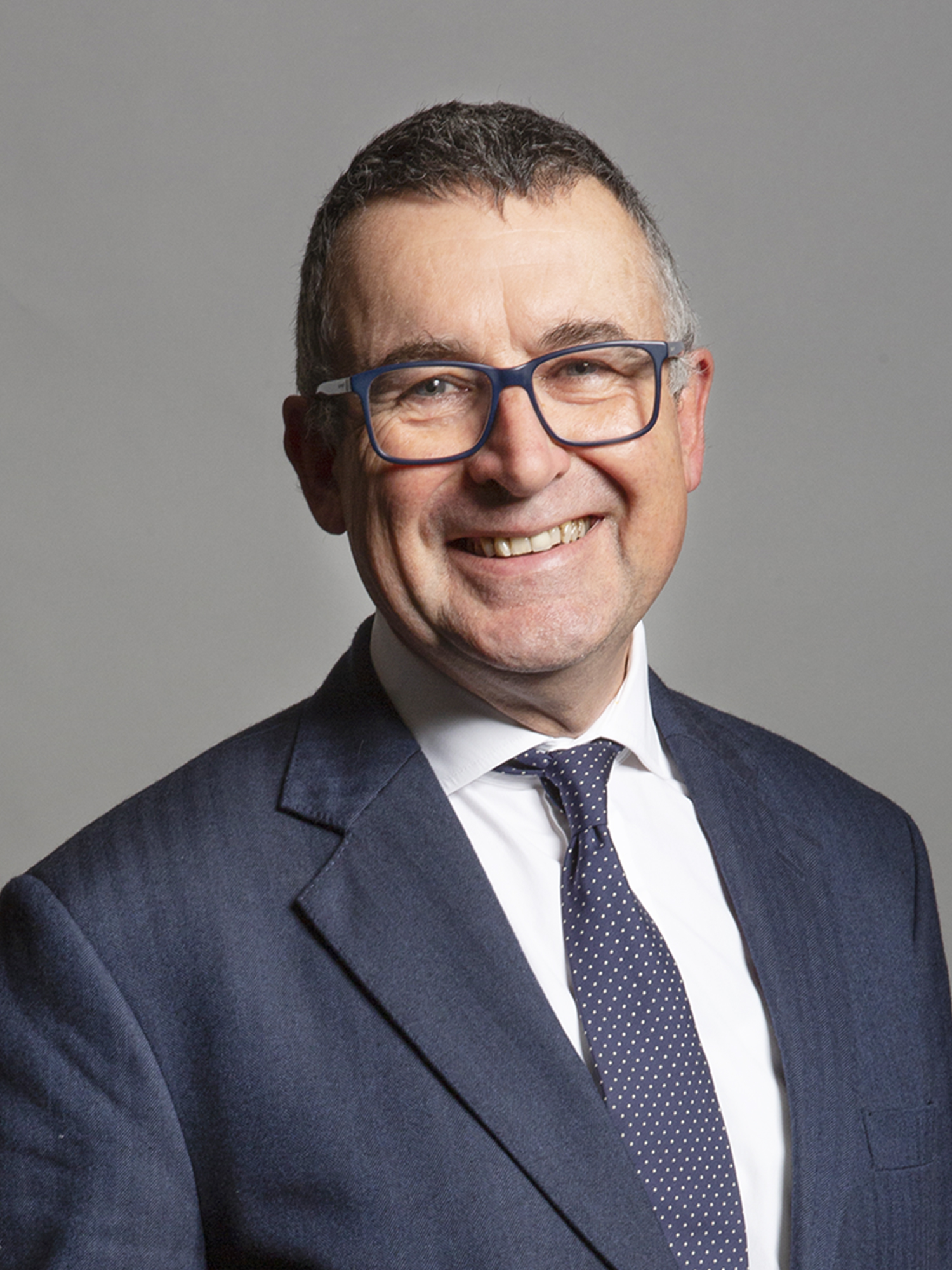
- Official portrait, 2019

Chair of the Liaison Committee
- In office 23 May 2020 – 30 May 2024
- Preceded by: Sarah Wollaston
- Succeeded by: Meg Hillier

Chair of the Public Administration and Constitutional Affairs Select Committee (Note: As chair of the Public Administration Committee from 2010 to May 2015.)
- In office 10 June 2010 – 6 November 2019
- Preceded by: Tony Wright
- Succeeded by: William Wragg

Deputy Chairman of the Conservative Party
- In office 1 December 2005 – 7 November 2006 Serving with The Lord Ashcroft
- Leader: Michael Howard; David Cameron
- Succeeded by: John Maples
Shadow portfolios
Shadow Minister for Energy and Climate Change
In office 10 May 2005 – 8 December 2005
Leader	Michael Howard
Shadow Secretary of State for the Regions
In office 11 November 2003 – 6 May 2005
Leader	Michael Howard
Preceded by	David Davis
Succeeded by	Caroline Spelman
Shadow Secretary of State for Defence
In office 18 September 2001 – 6 November 2003
Leader	Iain Duncan Smith
Preceded by	Iain Duncan Smith
Succeeded by	Nicholas Soames
Shadow Minister for Transport
In office 19 June 1998 – 1 September 2001
Leader	William Hague
Preceded by	Tim Yeo
Succeeded by	Eric Pickles

Member of Parliament
- Incumbent
- Assumed office 9 April 1992
- Preceded by: Antony Buck
- Constituency: Colchester North (1992–1997); North Essex (1997–2010); Harwich and North Essex (2010–present)
- Majority: 1,162 (2.4%)

Personal details
- Born: Bernard Christison Jenkin; 9 April 1959 (age 67) Wood Green, Middlesex, England
- Party: Conservative
- Spouse: Anne Strutt (m. 1988; div. 2022)
- Children: 2
- Parent: Patrick Jenkin (father)
- Education: Corpus Christi College, Cambridge (BA)

Sir Bernard Christison Jenkin (born 9 April 1959) is a British Conservative Party politician who has been the Member of Parliament (MP) for Harwich and North Essex, previously Colchester North then North Essex, since 1992. He also served as chair of the Liaison Committee.

Jenkin was elected chairman of the Public Administration Select Committee in May 2010. He is a longstanding critic of the European Union, believing that EU membership undermined the United Kingdom's national sovereignty, and he was one of the Maastricht Rebels during the premiership of John Major. In the 2016 EU referendum he supported Brexit and from 2017 he was one of the most vocal supporters of the Eurosceptic pressure group Leave Means Leave.

== Early life and career ==
Bernard Jenkin was born on 9 April 1959 in Wood Green, to Patrick Jenkin, who subsequently became a Conservative MP and Cabinet minister, and later a life peer (as Baron Jenkin of Roding); and Monica Jenkin (née Graham). He is a descendant of the scientist Fleeming Jenkin.

He was educated at the fee-paying independent Highgate School, the voluntary aided William Ellis School, and Corpus Christi College, Cambridge, where he was awarded a choral exhibition and gained a BA honours degree in English literature in 1982. He was President of the Cambridge Union Society in 1982.

After graduation, Jenkin worked in sales & marketing for Ford from 1983 to 1986, at the private equity company 3i from 1986 to 1988, and as a manager at Legal & General Ventures Ltd from 1989 to 1992. From 1992 to 1995, by then serving as an MP, he was an advisor to Legal & General Group plc, the parent company of his previous employer.

Jenkin stood for election as the Conservative candidate in Glasgow Central at the 1987 general election, coming second with 13% of the vote behind the incumbent Labour MP Bob McTaggart.

== Parliamentary career ==
=== 1st term (1992–1997) ===
At the 1992 general election, his 33rd birthday, Jenkin was elected as MP for Colchester North with 51.5% of the vote and a majority of 16,402.

During John Major's government, Jenkin was one of the Maastricht Rebels who defied the party whip to oppose the Maastricht Treaty.

=== 2nd term (1997–2001) ===
Prior to the 1997 general election, Colchester North was abolished, and replaced with North Essex. At the general election, Jenkin was elected as MP for North Essex with 43.9% of the vote and a majority of 5,476.

William Hague appointed him Shadow Minister for Transport, serving from 1998 to 2001.

=== 3rd term (2001–2005) ===
At the 2001 general election, Jenkin was re-elected as MP for North Essex with an increased vote share of 47.4% and an increased majority of 7,186.

Jenkin served as Shadow Secretary of State for Defence from 2001 to 2003 under Iain Duncan Smith and Shadow Regions Secretary from 2003 to 2005 under Michael Howard.

=== 4th term (2005–2010) ===
Jenkin was again re-elected at the 2005 general election with an increased vote share of 47.6% and an increased majority of 10,903. He was appointed as Deputy Chairman of the Conservative Party after the general election and served until 7 November 2006, when he was replaced by John Maples. Jenkin's deputy chairman role came to an end when, during a shadow cabinet reshuffle, he was offered another frontbench position, which he declined, reportedly saying to David Cameron that only a return to the shadow cabinet would interest him.

In 2006, Jenkin faced criticism after he used the word "coloured" when referring to a British Asian Conservative A-List candidate, Ali Miraj. As of 2025, Jenkin uses the term "black and ethnic minority".

=== 5th term (2010–2015) ===
Prior to the 2010 general election, Jenkin's constituency of North Essex was abolished and replaced with Harwich and North Essex. At the election, Jenkin was elected as MP for Harwich and North Essex with 46.9% of the vote and a majority of 11,447.

In May 2012, Jenkin was re-elected as a member of the Executive of the 1922 Committee.

Jenkin, who gained a reputation as a critic of the Coalition government, led calls to drop the House of Lords Reform Bill 2012. Jenkin voted in favour of same sex marriage in 2013 "as a matter of principle", whilst acknowledging the decision to hold the debate caused much "political unhappiness".

In January 2014, Jenkin drafted a letter calling for Prime Minister Cameron to renegotiate Britain's relationship with the EU to give the House of Commons powers to veto EU legislation, which was ultimately signed by 95 MPs, and reportedly backed by another six. Following the Scottish independence referendum and promises made to further devolve powers to Scotland, Jenkin called for the creation of an "English First Minister" and for departments responsible for policy that applied only in England to be accountable only to the English MPs.

=== 6th term (2015–2017) ===
Jenkin was re-elected as MP for Harwich and North Essex at the 2015 general election with an increased vote share of 51% and an increased majority of 15,174. Following the general election, he was returned unopposed as the chairman of the Public Administration and Constitutional Affairs Select Committee.

Jenkin was one of the most vocal supporters of the Eurosceptic pressure group Leave Means Leave, and was a prominent Leave supporter in the Brexit referendum.

=== 7th term (2017–2019) ===
At the snap 2017 general election, Jenkin was again re-elected, with an increased vote share of 58.5% and a decreased majority of 14,356.

In September 2019, Jenkin criticised the House of Commons speaker John Bercow, stating that he was "irretrievably politicised and radicalised". This comment came after Bercow made a speech warning Boris Johnson that "the only form of Brexit which we will have, whenever that might be, will be a Brexit that the House of Commons has explicitly endorsed".

=== 8th term (2019–2024) ===
Jenkin was again re-elected at the 2019 general election, with an increased vote share of 60.3% and an increased majority of 20,182.

Although a sceptic of lockdown, Jenkin supported the first COVID-19 tier regulations in England. However, he urged Boris Johnson to put forward a white paper on the issue, setting out how the UK can deal with COVID-19 through treatments, social distancing and an improved NHS Test and Trace.

In 2021, he was a critic of Russia, and urged the government to take action in Ukraine.

In June 2023 Boris Johnson called for Jenkin to resign, after his participation in the Commons Select Committee of Privileges which investigated whether Johnson had misled parliament, when it was reported by the Guido Fawkes website that Jenkin had attended an event on 8 December 2020 in parliament. It was reportedly the date of his wife's birthday, with a "drinks party" held by Eleanor Laing, a Commons deputy speaker, in her office. In December 2023, it was found that the allegations did not meet the threshold for a fixed penalty notice by the police.

In December 2023, Jenkin was placed under investigation by the Parliamentary Commissioner for Standards, Daniel Greenberg, for alleged "actions causing significant damage to the reputation of the House as a whole, or of its Members generally". On 26 March, Greenberg's investigation determined the allegations would not be upheld.

=== 9th term (2024–) ===
At the 2024 general election, Jenkin was again re-elected, with a decreased vote share of 34.4% and a decreased majority of 1,162.

== Expenses claims ==
In May 2009, Jenkin was reported by The Daily Telegraph to have used £50,000 in expenses to pay his sister-in-law rent on the property he uses as his constituency home. Jenkin said that he was just paying "an honest and reasonable rent" for the property. On 27 October 2009, it was initially recommended that Bernard Jenkin pay back £63,250 by expenses auditor Sir Thomas Legg. This is the highest amount known to have been recommended after an audit of MPs' claims on second homes expenses. His father ultimately settled the bill for him. This amount was reduced to £36,250 following an appeal.

== In popular culture ==
Jenkin's role on the Public Administration and Constitutional Affairs Select Committee was dramatised in the 2017 verbatim musical Committee: (A New Musical), which retold the downfall of the charity Kids Company and which was first performed at the Donmar Warehouse. Jenkin was portrayed by actor Alexander Hanson.

Jenkin was portrayed by Tim McMullan in the 2019 Channel 4 drama Brexit: The Uncivil War.

== Personal life ==
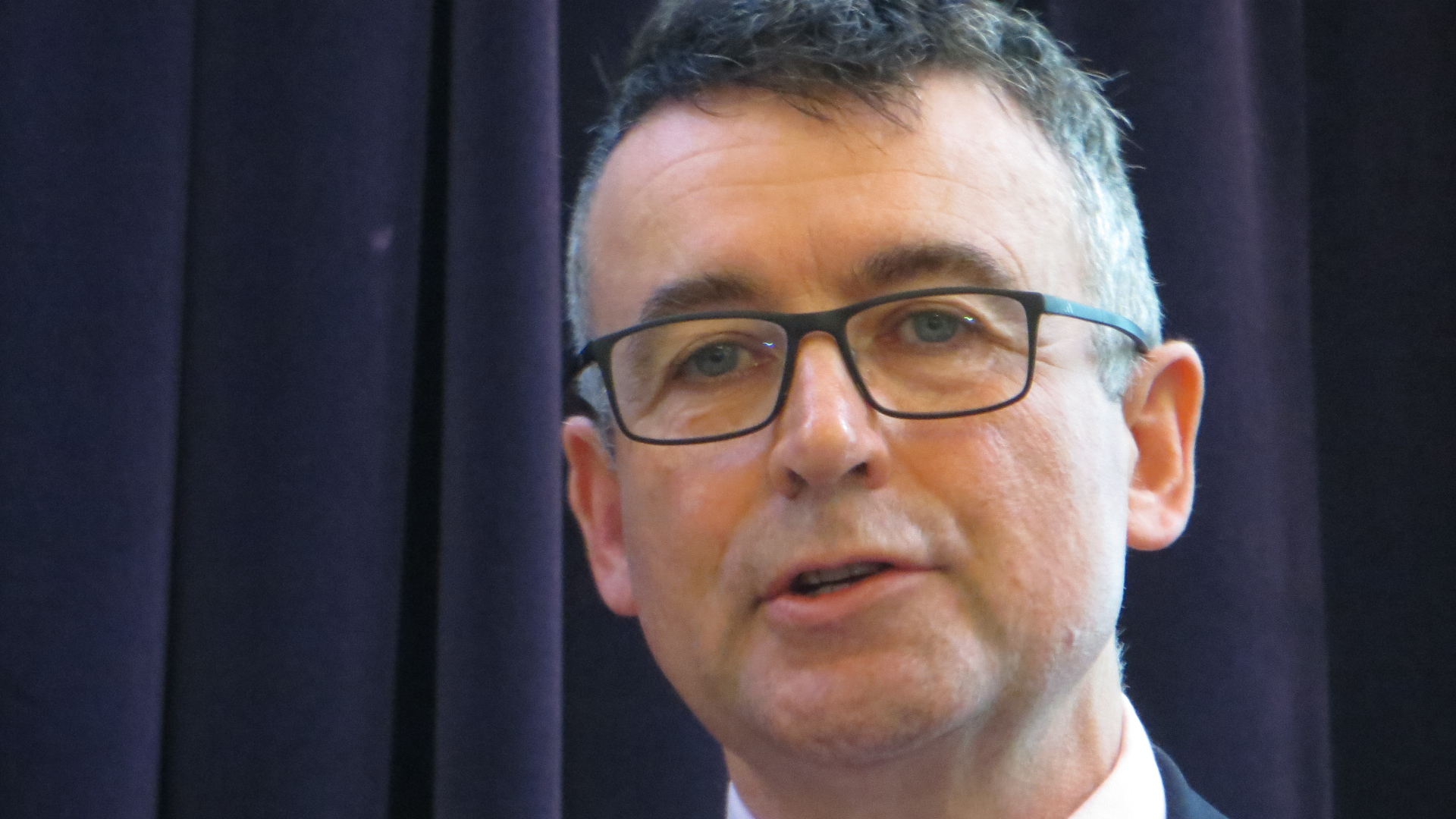
Bernard Jenkin in January 2016

Jenkin married Anne Strutt in 1988 and has two sons. He is an occasional naturist, and a long-time acquaintance of screenwriter Richard Curtis, who typically includes a character named 'Bernard' in everything he writes.

He separated from his wife in 2022.

Jenkin is the vice-president of the UK charity Combat Stress, which offers residential treatment to ex-servicemen and women suffering from post-traumatic stress disorder. To mark his 50th birthday, he held a fundraising event in March 2009 which raised over £50,000 for the charity.

== Honours ==
In 2018, Jenkin was awarded with a knighthood honouring his political and public service.

Jenkin is in favour of marriage equality and was nominated for a Stonewall award in 2013. The Climate Coalition awarded him the Green Heart Hero Award in May 2018 for his eco-friendly lifestyle choices.

== Notes ==
Parliament of the United Kingdom
Preceded by Antony Buck	Member of Parliament for Colchester North; 1992–1997	Constituency abolished
New constituency	Member of Parliament for North Essex; 1997–2010	Constituency abolished
New constituency	Member of Parliament for Harwich and North Essex; 2010–present	Incumbent
Political offices
Preceded by Tim Yeo as Shadow Minister for Environment, Transport and the Regions	Shadow Minister for Transport; 1998–2001	Succeeded by Eric Pickles
Preceded by Iain Duncan Smith	Shadow Secretary of State for Defence; 2001–2003	Succeeded by Nicholas Soames
Preceded by David Davis as Shadow Secretary of State for the Office of the Deputy Prime Minister	Shadow Secretary of State for the Regions; 2003–2005	Succeeded by Caroline Spelman as Shadow Secretary of State for Local Government Affairs and Communities
Preceded by	Shadow Minister for Energy and Climate Change; 2005	Succeeded by
Party political offices
Preceded by	Deputy Chairman of the Conservative Party; 2005–2006; With: The Lord Ashcroft	Succeeded by John Maples
