= Sir John Tyrell, 2nd Baronet =

English politician

Sir John Tyssen Tyrell, 2nd Baronet (21 December 1795 – 19 September 1877), of Boreham House, near Chelmsford, Essex, was an English Conservative Party politician.

== Family ==
Tyrell was the eldest son of Sir John Tyrell, 1st Baronet and Sarah Tyssen, the daughter and heiress of William Tyssen of Cheshunt, Hertfordshire. Tyrell was educated at Felsted School and Winchester College before being admitted to Trinity College, Cambridge in 1813. In 1814 he migrated college to Jesus College. On 19 May 1819, he married Elizabeth Ann Pilkington, the daughter of Sir Thomas Pilkington, 7th Baronet. They had two sons and three daughters.

== Career ==
Tyrell was a member of parliament (MP) for Essex from 1830 to 1831. Succeeding his father as Baronet in 1832, he sat as MP for North Essex from 1832 to 1857.

Parliament of the United Kingdom
Preceded by Thomas Gardiner Bramston; Charles Callis Western	Member of Parliament for Essex; 1830–1831; With: Charles Callis Western	Succeeded by Charles Callis Western; William Pole-Tylney-Long-Wellesley
New constituency	Member of Parliament for North Essex; 1832–1857; With: Alexander Baring to 1835; John Payne Elwes 1835–1837; Charles Gray Round 1837–1847; William Beresford from 1847	Succeeded by William Beresford; Charles Du Cane
Baronetage of the United Kingdom
Preceded by John Tyrell	Baronet (of Boreham House); 1832–1877	Extinct
