= Thomas Western (Royal Navy officer) =

Thomas Western (1761–1814) was a Royal Navy officer serving through periods of conflict with both the Dutch and French fleets at the end of the 18th century.

== Life ==
He was born in 1761 the second son of Thomas Western of Walcot (1735-1781) and his wife, Jane Calvert. He was one of at least 13 children.

He entered the Royal Navy in September 1780. His early service is unclear, but he was appointed Commander of the 8-gun HMS Vesuvius in April 1793. This notional command was based at Deptford but in October he was given a more operational command: on the 16-gun HMS Scorpion in place of Solomon Ferris. In March 1794 he took the Scorpion to Jamaica as part of the campaign against the French. There he showed himself a highly worthy commander, winning a succession of attacks against French ships, capturing in turn: the 10-gun "La Guillotine", off the east coast of America (2.8.1794); the 18-gun "La Victoire", in the West Indies (19.4.1795); "L'Egalite" in the West Indies (8.5.1795); "Le Sans Pareil" in West Indies (22.7.1795); "Le Republican" in West Indies (3.8.1795); and "L'Hirondelle" in West Indies (7.8.1795). Inevitably with so much action the Scorpion was damaged and she returned to England for repair in October 1796.

Western had left the ship (after the series of actions) in February 1796 and spent a period of extended shore leave in the West Indies, marrying his wife in this period.

In 1797 he was given command of the huge 64-gun HMS Dictator based in Jamaica at the rank of Captain and Commander. In December 1797 he transferred to command of the newly commissioned 38-gun HMS Tamar, still based in Jamaica. He held command of Tamar and her crew of 270 men, for four eventful years. In June 1799 she sailed to the Leeward Islands and in August 1799 took part in the large attack on the coastline of Surinam on the north coast of South America. The latter was alongside the 98-gun flagship HMS Prince of Wales under Captain Adrian Renou but under overall command of Vice Admiral Lord Hugh Seymour, and the relatively old but well-named 74-gun HMS Invincible under Captain William Cayley. This action began on 11 August and lasted 10 days, and resulted in the surrender of the Dutch colony of Fort Amsterdam on the last day. This resulted in a brief period during which Britain ruled over Surinam.

Two weeks later, on 25 August, still of Surinam the Tamar was involved in an independent attack on the 28-gun French ship "Republicain". Tamar showed her superior strength and at the cost of only two wounded compared to the overcrowded Republicain who had 9 killed and 12 wounded, before surrendering.

In August 1802 he took Tamar back to England for repairs in Chatham Docks. He was awarded a few years of shore leave with his wife and young family (who almost certainly travelled with him from the West Indies to England). He was only given a new command in July 1806 when he was given charge of the somewhat elderly but huge 90-gun HMS London. In November 1807 this was part of the unusual squadron which escorted the Portuguese Royal family into exile in Brazil. They arrived in Brazil in March 1808.

In 1808 he was awarded the Military Order of the Tower and Sword by the Portuguese Royal family. However, the British government did not permit him to accept this until the beginning of 1814, due to ongoing political difficulties between the countries.

In June 1809 he returned to London and both he and HMS London were paid off. Western was retired at the rank of Rear Admiral at this point. As Western was only 48 at this time this implies either illness or injury which prevented his full service.

He died at Tattingstone Place and is buried in Tattingstone Parish Church with a monument sculpted by John Flaxman RA.

== Family ==
He married Mary Burch (1777-1856) who he had met in Bermuda.

He was father to Thomas Burch Western (1795-1873) who was born on 25 August 1795 at which time his father was on very active service. His mother was only 18 at the time of his birth. It may therefore be said with certainty that he was conceived while his father was on active service during a period of brief shore leave, and his mother was only then 17. Western seems to have only married Mary Burch either shortly before or shortly after the birth.
