= Sir Charles Flower, 1st Baronet =

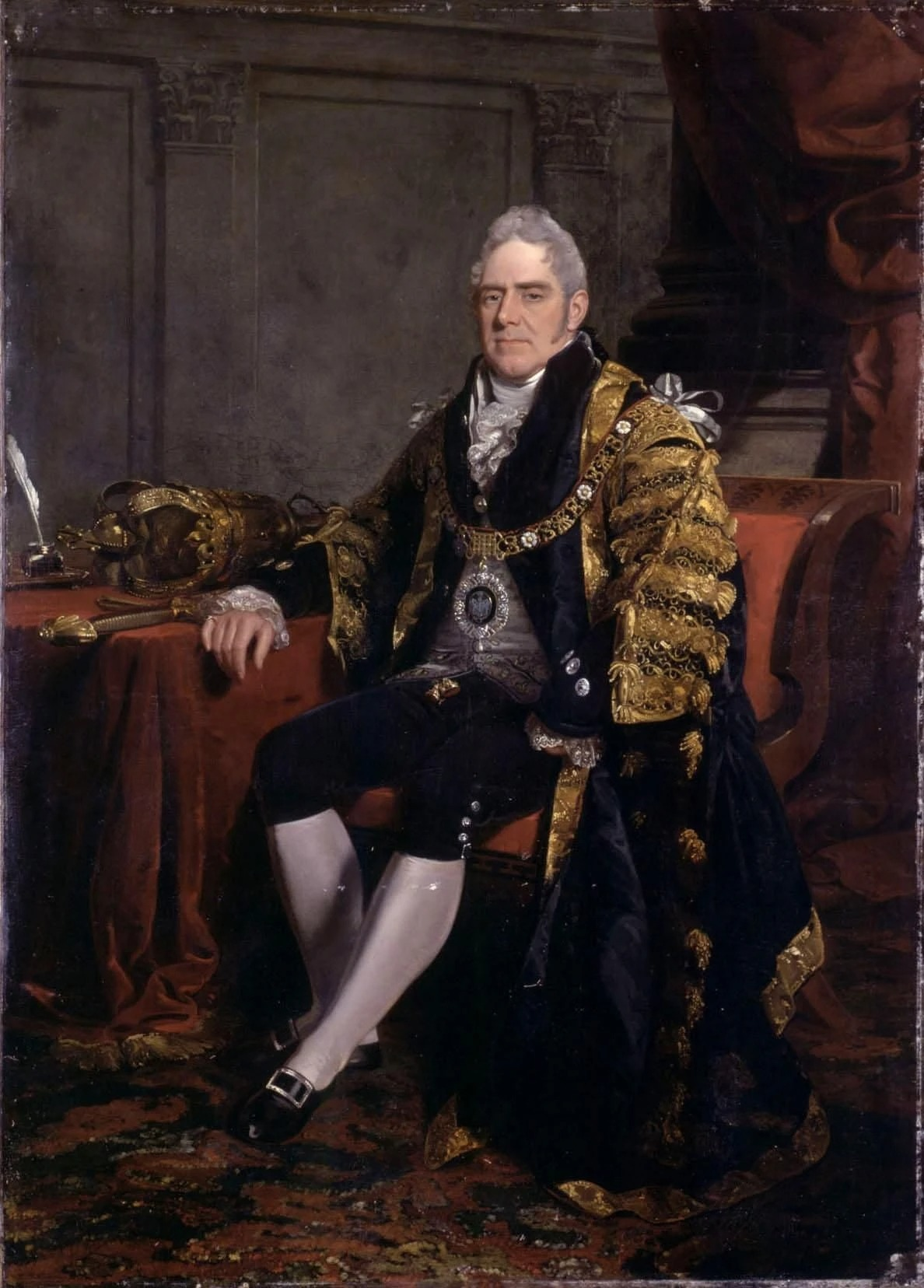
Sir Charles Flower, BT, Lord Mayor of London, by Ramsay Richard Reinagle

Sir Charles Flower, 1st Baronet (18 February 1763 – 15 September 1834) was a British merchant and politician who served as Lord Mayor of London from 1808 to 1809.

== Career ==
Flower traded in salt meat, butter and cheese, and was described as having acquired "an ample fortune" by the time of his ascendency to the mayoralty. He was created a baronet, of the Flower baronets, of Lobb in the County of Oxford and of Woodford in the County of Essex, on 1 December 1809.

Flower was appointed an alderman in the City of London's Cornhill ward in 1801. He had previously been elected one of the Sheriffs of the City of London in 1799.

Flower was a liveryman of the Worshipful Company of Framework Knitters.

== Personal life ==
Flower married Anne Squire of Plymouth (d. 1803) and they had seven children, James, Anne Mary Perceval (a noted botanist in Canada), Elizabeth, Caroline, Clarissa, Maria and Jemima.

His son Sir James Flower, 2nd Baronet inherited the baronetcy, which became extinct upon his death without heirs in 1850.

Civic offices
| Preceded by John Ansley | Lord Mayor of London; 1808–1809 | Succeeded by Thomas Smith |
Baronetage of the United Kingdom
| New creation | Baronet (of Lobb and Woodford); 1809–1834 | Succeeded by James Flower |
