= John Bagshaw =

British Whig property developer and politician (1784-1861)

John Bagshaw (1784 – 20 December 1861) was a British Whig property developer and politician.

== Life ==
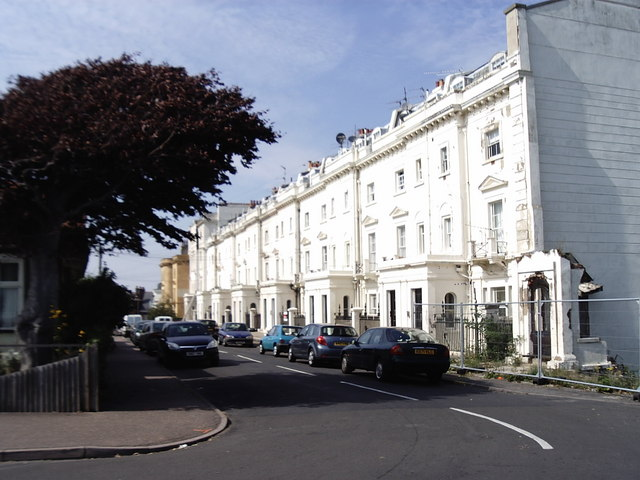
Orwell Road, Dovercourt

He was the son of John Bagshaw of Rugby, Warwickshire.

He moved to Harwich in Essex and acquired land at nearby Dovercourt, where he developed plans with the help of W.H. Lindsey, a London architect, to build a new resort overlooking the sea. He started the project in 1845 by building a mansion, Cliff House, for himself and his family and actively promoted a railway link to Harwich. When a chalybeate spring was discovered in the grounds of Cliff House, Bagshaw extended the property to incorporate a spa, library, pump room, and conservatory. He next developed Orwell Terrace where his son Robert John Bagshaw, also an MP for Harwich, moved into Banksea House in 1857. However the developments, which included Marine Parade and the Cliff Estate, caused him financial difficulties and he was declared bankrupt in 1859.

== Parliamentary career ==
He was elected at the 1835 general election as Member of Parliament (MP) for Sudbury, having unsuccessfully contested the seat at a by-election in July 1834. At the 1837 general election, he did not stand again in Sudbury, but contested Kidderminster unsuccessfully. At the 1841 general election he stood instead in Harwich, but was not elected. He won the seat in 1847, but was defeated in 1852. However, the election of his Conservative Party successor was voided on petition, and Bagshaw won the resulting by-election on 21 June 1853. After being re-elected in 1857, he resigned his seat in the House of Commons on 9 March 1859, through appointment as Steward of the Chiltern Hundreds.

== Private life ==
He died in Norwood in 1861 after the contents of his house and spa had been sold and his estate broken up. Cliff House was demolished in 1909 and the Spa in 1920. He had married twice and had a son and 3 daughters. His son John Robert continued the development of Dovercourt and also became MP for Harwich.

Parliament of the United Kingdom
Preceded by Sir John Benn Walsh; Sir Edward Barnes	Member of Parliament for Sudbury; 1835 – 1837; With: Benjamin Smith	Succeeded by Sir John James Hamilton; Sir Edward Barnes
Preceded by William Beresford; John Attwood	Member of Parliament for Harwich; 1847 – 1852; With: John Attwood to 1848; Sir John Cam Hobhouse, Bt 1848–1851; Henry Thoby Prinsep 1851; Robert Wigram Crawford 1851–1852; Sir Fitzroy Kelly 1852; Isaac Butt from 1852	Succeeded by George Peacocke; David Waddington
Preceded by George Peacocke; David Waddington	Member of Parliament for Harwich; 1853–1859; With: David Waddington to 1857; George Drought Warburton 1857; Robert John Bagshaw from 1857	Succeeded by Henry Jervis-White-Jervis; Robert John Bagshaw
