= John Payne Elwes =

British politician

John Payne Elwes (13 May 1798 – 1849) was a British politician.

Elwes lived at Stoke College in Suffolk, and later at Grove House in Essex. He became a magistrate for Suffolk and Essex, and in 1826 served as High Sheriff of Suffolk. He stood in the 1835 North Essex by-election for the Conservative Party, winning the seat. However, he stood down at the 1837 UK general election.

Civic offices
| Preceded by Henry Bunbury | High Sheriff of Suffolk; 1826 | Succeeded by John Francis Leathes |
Parliament of the United Kingdom
| Preceded by Alexander Baring; John Tyrell | Member of Parliament for North Essex; 1835–1837; With: John Tyrell | Succeeded by Charles Gray Round; John Tyrell |
