= John Hobhouse, 1st Baron Broughton =

British politician (1786–1869)

The Right Honourable The Lord Broughton GCB PC FRS
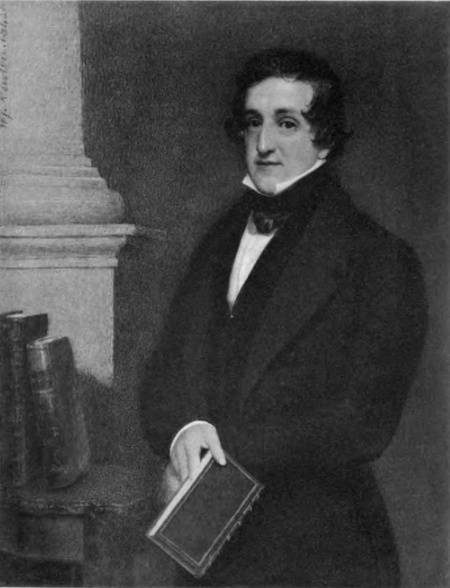
- Lord Broughton, from a miniature by Sir William Newton, R. A.

Member of Parliament for Westminster
- In office 1820–1833 Serving with Sir Francis Burdett
- Preceded by: George Lamb; Sir Francis Burdett
- Succeeded by: Sir George de Lacy Evans; Sir Francis Burdett

Secretary at War
- In office 1832–1833
- Preceded by: Sir Henry Parnell
- Succeeded by: Edward Ellice

Chief Secretary for Ireland
- In office 1833–1833
- Preceded by: Edward Smith-Stanley
- Succeeded by: Edward Littleton

Member of Parliament for Nottingham
- In office 1834–1847 Serving with Ronald Ferguson (1834–1841); John Walter (1841–1841); Sir George Larpent (1841–1842); John Walter (1842–1843); Thomas Gisborne (1843–1847)
- Preceded by: John Ponsonby; Sir Ronald Ferguson
- Succeeded by: John Walter III; Feargus O'Connor

Commissioner of Woods and Forests
- In office 1834–1834
- Preceded by: John Ponsonby
- Succeeded by: Lord Granville Somerset

President of the Board of Control
- In office 1835–1841
- Preceded by: Edward Law
- Succeeded by: Edward Law
- In office 1846–1852
- Preceded by: F. J. Robinson
- Succeeded by: Fox Maule-Ramsay
- In office 1848–1851 Serving with John Bagshaw
- Preceded by: John Attwood; John Bagshaw
- Succeeded by: Henry Prinsep; John Bagshaw

Personal details
- Born: 27 June 1786 Redland, near Bristol, England
- Died: 3 June 1869 (aged 82) Berkeley Square, London, England
- Party: Whig
- Spouse: Lady Julia Hay (d. 1835)
- Education: Trinity College, Cambridge

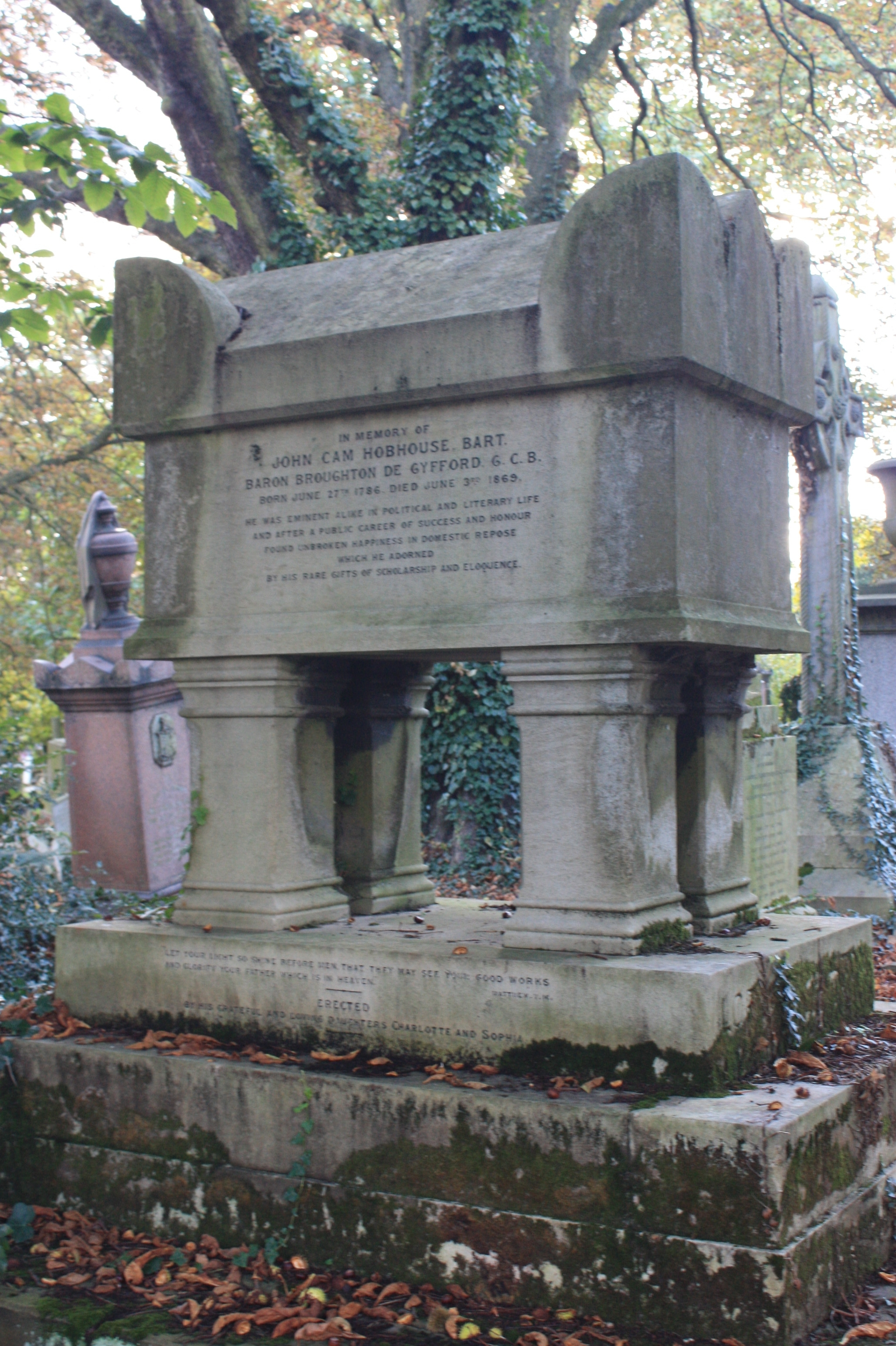
The tomb of John Cam Hobhouse, Kensal Green Cemetery, London

John Cam Hobhouse, 1st Baron Broughton, GCB, PC, FRS (27 June 1786 – 3 June 1869), known as Sir John Hobhouse, Bt, from 1831 to 1851, was an English politician and diarist.

== Early life ==
Born at Redland near Bristol, Broughton was the eldest son of Sir Benjamin Hobhouse, 1st Baronet, and Charlotte, daughter of Samuel Cam. He was educated at Westminster School, and at Trinity College, Cambridge where he graduated in 1808. Broughton took the Hulsean prize in 1808 for his Essay on the Origin and Intention of Sacrifices. At Cambridge he founded the Whig Club and the Amicable Society.

== Friendship with Lord Byron and mainland European journeys ==
While at Cambridge Broughton became a close friend of Lord Byron, and accompanied him on a tour through Spain, Greece and Turkey in 1809. The correspondence of the Cambridge circle reveals Hobhouse shared Byron's homosexual interests.

Hobhouse was present at the Battle of Dresden in August 1813, and, following the Coalition armies into France, he saw Louis XVIII enter Paris in May 1814.

In 1815 Broughton was again in Paris after the return of Napoleon Bonaparte from Elba (see Hundred Days), and showed his dislike of the House of Bourbon and his sympathy with Bonaparte by writing in 1816 a pamphlet entitled The substance of some letters written by an Englishman resident in Paris during the last reign of the emperor Napoleon. This caused some offence in England and more in France, and the French translation was seized by the government. Both the translator and the printer were imprisoned.

A further period of travel with Byron followed, and at this time Hobhouse wrote some notes to the fourth canto of Childe Harold. This canto was afterwards dedicated to him, and a revised edition of a part of his notes entitled Historical illustrations of the fourth canto of "Childe Harold" containing dissertations on the ruins of Rome and an essay on Italian literature, was published in 1818. He shared Byron's enthusiasm for the liberation of Greece. After the poet's death in 1824, Hobhouse proved his will, and superintended the arrangements for his funeral.

== Parliament ==
In February 1819 Hobhouse was the Radical candidate at a by-election for the representation of the City of Westminster, but he failed to secure election. He had already gained some popularity by writing in favour of reform, and in 1819 spoke the following words: "I am a man chosen for the people, by the people; and, if elected, I will do no other business than that of the people".

In the same year (1819) he issued A defence of the People in reply to Lord Erskine's "Two Defences of the Whigs," followed by A trifling mistake in Thomas, Lord Erskine's recent preface. The House of Commons declared this latter pamphlet a breach of privilege. Hobhouse was arrested for the pamphlet on 14 December 1819. In spite of an appeal to the court of king's bench, he remained imprisoned in Newgate Prison until the end of the following February. However this proceeding only increased his popularity, and at the general election of 1820 he was returned for Westminster.

In parliament Hobhouse proved a valuable recruit to the Reform party, and is credited with the invention of the phrase His Majesty's (Loyal) Opposition made in 1826 during a speech in the House of Commons.

Having succeeded his father as 2nd baronet in 1831, Hobhouse was appointed secretary at war in the Whig administration of Lord Grey in February 1832, and was made a Privy Councillor. He effected some reforms and economies during his tenure of this office (he was responsible for the passing of the Vestry Act 1831), but, unable to carry out all his wishes.

Hobhouse became Chief Secretary for Ireland in March 1833. He had only held this post for a few weeks when, in consequence of his refusal to vote with the government against the abolition of the Doors and Windows Tax, he resigned both his office and his seat in parliament. At the subsequent election he was defeated.

Hobhouse joined the cabinet as First Commissioner of Woods and Forests when Lord Melbourne became Prime Minister in July 1834, and about the same time Hobhouse was returned at a by-election as one of the members for Nottingham. In Melbourne's government of 1835 he was President of the Board of Control, in which position he strongly supported the Indian policy of Lord Auckland. He returned to the same office in July 1846 as a member of Lord John Russell's cabinet.

In February 1851 Hobhouse went to the House of Lords as Baron Broughton, of Broughton-de-Gyfford in the County of Wiltshire. He left office when Russell resigned in February 1852.

== Later life ==
In 1840 Hobhouse was appointed Colonel of the Wiltshire Militia; although disembodied, the regiment received the 'Royal' prefix a year later. When the Militia was reformed in 1852 he retained the colonelcy. He gave up the command in 1859 and was appointed the regiment's Honorary Colonel.

In 1852 Hobhouse was also made a Knight Grand Cross of the Order of the Bath (GCB), and took little part in political life, being mainly occupied in literary pursuits and in correspondence. Lord Broughton was a partner in Whitbread's brewery and a fellow of the Royal Society. He was one of the founders of the Royal Geographical Society which formed on 16 July 1830.

In the opinion of the author of his biography in the Encyclopaedia Britannica (1911) he was a good classical scholar, and although not eloquent, an able debater.

== Family ==
Lord Broughton married Lady Julia, daughter of George Hay, 7th Marquess of Tweeddale, in 1828. They had three daughters. Lady Julia died of tuberculosis in April 1835.

Hobhouse died in London on 3 June 1869. Being without heir male, the barony lapsed on his death. The baronetcy passed to his nephew, Charles Parry Hobhouse.

== Works ==
- Hobhouse took the Hulsean prize in 1808 for his essay on the Origin and Intention of Sacrifices.

Hobhouse edited and published:

- The Substance of Some letters written from Paris during the last reign of the Emperor Napoleon, vol. 1, Philadelphia: M. Thomas, 1816
- The substance of some letters written from Paris during the last reign of the Emperor Napoleon, vol. 2 (Two volumes ed.), London: Redgeways, 1817

Hobhouse wrote and published:

- Journey through Albania, 1813
- Historical Illustrations of the Fourth Canto of Childe Harold, 1818
- Italy: Remarks Made in Several Visits, from the Year 1816 to 1854, Murray, reissued by Cambridge University Press, 2009 [1859], ISBN 978-1-108-00398-8
- A defence of the People in reply to Lord Erskine's "Two Defences of the Whigs," followed by A trifling mistake in Thomas, Lord Erskine's recent preface, 1819
- Recollections of a Long Life, 1865
- The Prelude to Lord Byron's Epitah to a Dog, 1808

For private circulation, and he left (in manuscript) Diaries, Correspondence, and Memoranda, etc., not to be opened till 1900, extracts from which were published by his daughter, Lady Dorchester, also under the title of Recollections from a Long Life, 1909.

A collection of Hobhouse's diaries, correspondence and memoranda is in the British Museum.

== Depiction in popular culture ==
Hobhouse was played by the character actor Raymond Lovell in the 1949 period drama The Bad Lord Byron.

== Notes ==
Parliament of the United Kingdom
Preceded by George Lamb; Sir Francis Burdett, Bt	Member of Parliament for Westminster; 1820–1833; With: Sir Francis Burdett, Bt	Succeeded by De Lacy Evans; Sir Francis Burdett, Bt
Preceded by Viscount Duncannon; Ronald Craufurd Ferguson	Member of Parliament for Nottingham; 1834–1847; With: Ronald Craufurd Ferguson to 1841; John Walter 1841; George Larpent 1841–1842; John Walter 1842–1843; Thomas Gisborne the Younger 1843–1847	Succeeded by John Walter; Feargus Edward O'Connor
Preceded by John Bagshaw; John Attwood	Member of Parliament for Harwich; 1848–1851; With: John Bagshaw	Succeeded by John Bagshaw; Henry Thoby Prinsep
Political offices
Preceded by Sir Henry Parnell, Bt	Secretary at War; 1832–1833	Succeeded by Edward Ellice
Preceded by Edward Smith-Stanley	Chief Secretary for Ireland; 1833	Succeeded by Edward Littleton
Preceded by Viscount Duncannon	First Commissioner of Woods and Forests; 1834	Succeeded by Lord Granville Somerset
Preceded by The Lord Ellenborough	President of the Board of Control; 1835–1841	Succeeded by The Lord Ellenborough
Preceded by The Earl of Ripon	President of the Board of Control; 1846–1852	Succeeded by Fox Maule
Peerage of the United Kingdom
New creation	Baron Broughton; 1851–1869	Extinct
Baronetage of the United Kingdom
Preceded by Benjamin Hobhouse	Baronet (of Westbury); 1831–1869	Succeeded by Charles Hobhouse
