= Cotton-Sheppard baronets =

Extinct baronetcy in the Baronetage of the United Kingdom

Escutcheon of the Cotton-Sheppard baronets of Thornton Hall

The Sheppard, later Cotton-Sheppard Baronetcy, of Thornton Hall in the County of Buckingham, was a title in the Baronetage of the United Kingdom. It was created on 29 September 1809 for Thomas Sheppard. He married Elizabeth, daughter of Reverend William Cotton, through which marriage Thornton Hall came into the Sheppard family. Their son, the second Baronet, assumed by Royal sign manual the additional surname of Cotton in 1806. The title became extinct on his death in 1848.

== Sheppard, later Cotton-Sheppard baronets, of Thornton Hall (1809) ==
- Sir Thomas Sheppard, 1st Baronet (died 1821)
- Sir Thomas Cotton-Sheppard, 2nd Baronet (1785–1848)

Baronetage of the United Kingdom
Preceded by Tyrell baronets	Sheppard baronets of Thornton Hall; 29 September 1809	Succeeded by Flower baronets
