= Thomas Smith (Lord Mayor of London) =

Lord Mayor of London in 1809

Thomas Smith (1746–1823) was a merchant who served as Lord Mayor of London in 1809. Smith was a wineseller on Bridge Street near Blackfriars for many years and also served as a magistrate after his ascent to the mayoralty. Smith lived between London and Brighton in his last years.

Smith was appointed as an alderman in the City of London's Farringdon Within ward in 1802.

Smith was a liveryman of the Worshipful Company of Leathersellers and served as Master of that Company in 1812–13.

Civic offices
Preceded by Sir Charles Flower, 1st Baronet	Lord Mayor of London; 1809–1810	Succeeded by Joshua Smith
