= North Essex =

UK Parliament constituency (1832–1868, 1997–2010)

- Former county constituency for the House of Commons
- Boundary of North Essex in Essex for the 2005 general election

- Location of Essex within England
- County: Essex

1997–2010
- Seats: One
- Created from: Colchester North
- Replaced by: Harwich and North Essex

1832–1868
- Created from: Essex
- Replaced by: East Essex, West Essex

North Essex was a parliamentary constituency represented in the House of Commons of the Parliament of the United Kingdom between 1997 and 2010. It elected one Member of Parliament (MP) by the first past the post system of election.

The name was also used for the Northern Division of Essex, covering a much wider area and electing two members using the bloc vote system from 1832 until 1868.

== History ==
The Northern Division of Essex was one of two Divisions, along with the Southern Division, created from the undivided Parliamentary County of Essex by the Reform Act 1832. The constituency was abolished under the Reform Act 1867 (as amended by the Boundaries Act 1868) which divided Essex into three two-member Divisions (East, South and West).

The North Essex constituency was created for the 1997 general election following the Fourth Periodic Review of Westminster constituencies, mostly replacing the former seat of Colchester North. This was abolished for the 2010 general election by the Fifth Review, when it was largely replaced by the new constituency of Harwich and North Essex.

== Boundaries ==
=== 1832–1868 ===
- The Hundreds of Clavering, Dunmow, Freshwell, Hinckford, Lexden, Tendring, Thurstable, Uttlesford, Winstree and Witham.

See map on Vision of Britain website.

On abolition, the Hundreds of Hinckford, Lexden, Tendring, Thurstable, Winstree and Witham were included in the new East Division of Essex; the Hundreds of Clavering, Dunmow, Freshwell and Uttlesford were included in the new West Division.

=== 1997–2010 ===
- The Borough of Colchester wards of Birch Messing and Copford, Boxted and Langham, Dedham, East Donyland, Fordham, Great and Little Horkesley, Great Tey, Marks Tey, Pyefleet, Tiptree, West Bergholt and Eight Ash Green, West Mersea, Winstree, and Wivenhoe; and
- The District of Tendring wards of Alresford, Thorrington and Frating, Ardleigh, Bradfield, Wrabness and Wix, Brightlingsea East, Brightlingsea West, Elmstead, Great Bentley, Great Bromley, Little Bromley and Little Bentley, Lawford and Manningtree, Mistley, St Osyth, and Tendring and Weeley.

The new constituency comprised rural areas of the Borough of Colchester, including West Mersea and Wivenhoe, and western parts of the District of Tendring, including Brightlingsea. Formed primarily from parts of the abolished constituencies of North Colchester and South Colchester and Maldon, with a small slice of the western part of Harwich, including St Osyth.

=== Abolition and the new Harwich and North Essex constituency ===
On abolition in 2010, the rural area to the south-west of Colchester was transferred to the new constituency of Witham. The remainder formed the new constituency of Harwich and North Essex, together with the town of Harwich and surrounding areas, previously part of the abolished Harwich constituency.

== Members of Parliament ==
=== MPs 1832–1868 ===
Election	1st Member	1st Party	2nd Member	2nd Party
1832	Sir John Tyrell, Bt	Tory	Alexander Baring	Tory
1834	Sir John Tyrell, Bt	Conservative	Alexander Baring	Conservative
1835 by-election	Sir John Tyrell, Bt	Conservative	John Payne Elwes	Conservative
1837	Sir John Tyrell, Bt	Conservative	Charles Gray Round	Conservative
1847	Sir John Tyrell, Bt	Conservative	William Beresford	Conservative
1857	Charles Du Cane	Conservative	William Beresford	Conservative
1865	Charles Du Cane	Conservative	Sir Thomas Western	Liberal
1868	Reform Act 1867: constituency abolished			

=== MPs 1997–2010 ===
Election	Member	Party
1997	Bernard Jenkin	Conservative
2010	Constituency abolished: see Harwich and North Essex	

== Elections ==
=== Elections in the 2000s ===
General election 2005: North Essex
Party	Candidate	Votes	%	±%
Conservative	Bernard Jenkin	22,811	47.6	+0.2
Labour	Elizabeth Hughes	11,908	24.8	−6.7
Liberal Democrats	James Raven	9,831	20.5	+3.0
Green	Chris Fox	1,718	3.6	New
UKIP	George Curtis	1,691	3.5	−0.1
Majority		10,903	22.8	+6.9
Turnout		47,959	65.7	+2.9
Conservative hold		Swing	+3.4	

General election 2001: North Essex
Party	Candidate	Votes	%	±%
Conservative	Bernard Jenkin	21,325	47.4	+3.5
Labour	Philip Hawkins	14,139	31.5	−1.7
Liberal Democrats	Trevor Ellis	7,867	17.5	−2.5
UKIP	George Curtis	1,613	3.6	+1.3
Majority		7,186	15.9	+5.2
Turnout		44,944	62.8	−12.5
Conservative hold		Swing		

=== Elections in the 1990s ===
General election 1997: North Essex
Party	Candidate	Votes	%	±%
Conservative	Bernard Jenkin	22,480	43.9	−13.8
Labour	Timothy Young	17,004	33.2	+12.8
Liberal Democrats	Andrew Phillips	10,028	20.0	−5.1
UKIP	Roger Lord	1,202	2.3	New
Green	Susan Ransome	495	1.0	0.0
Majority		5,476	10.7	−17.3
Turnout		51,209	75.3	−4.0
Conservative hold		Swing	−14.0	

Notional result for the General Election 1992: North Essex
Party	Candidate	Votes	%	±%
Conservative	Bernard Jenkin	36,381	53.1	
Liberal Democrats		17,224	25.1	
Labour		14,014	20.4	
Green		700	1.0	
Natural Law		238	0.3	
Majority		19,157	28.0	
Turnout		68,557	79.3	
Conservative hold		Swing		

=== Elections in the 1860s ===
By-election, 16 July 1866: North Essex
Party	Candidate	Votes	%	±%
Conservative	Charles Du Cane	Unopposed		
Conservative hold				

- Caused by Du Cane's appointment as a Civil Lord of the Admiralty.

General election 1865: North Essex
Party	Candidate	Votes	%	±%
Conservative	Charles Du Cane	2,081	35.3	N/A
Liberal	Thomas Western	1,931	32.8	New
Conservative	William Beresford	1,881	31.9	N/A
Turnout		3,912 (est)	78.8 (est)	N/A
Registered electors		4,904		
Majority		150	2.5	N/A
Conservative hold		Swing	N/A	
Majority		50	0.9	N/A
Liberal gain from Conservative		Swing	N/A	

=== Elections in the 1850s ===
General election 1859: North Essex
Party	Candidate	Votes	%	±%
Conservative	Charles Du Cane	Unopposed		
Conservative	William Beresford	Unopposed		
Registered electors		5,510		
Conservative hold				
Conservative hold				

General election 1857: North Essex
Party	Candidate	Votes	%	±%
Conservative	Charles Du Cane	Unopposed		
Conservative	William Beresford	Unopposed		
Registered electors		5,553		
Conservative hold				
Conservative hold				

General election 1852: North Essex
Party	Candidate	Votes	%	±%
Conservative	John Tyrell	2,412	43.2	+4.3
Conservative	William Beresford	2,334	41.8	+5.7
Whig	Thomas Barrett-Lennard	833	14.9	−10.2
Majority		1,501	26.9	+15.3
Turnout		3,206 (est)	56.1 (est)	−2.1
Registered electors		5,715		
Conservative hold		Swing	+4.7	
Conservative hold		Swing	+5.4	

By-election, 9 March 1852: North Essex
Party	Candidate	Votes	%	±%
Conservative	William Beresford	Unopposed		
Conservative hold				

- Caused by Beresford's appointment as Secretary at War.

=== Elections in the 1840s ===
General election 1847: North Essex
Party	Candidate	Votes	%	±%
Conservative	John Tyrell	2,472	38.9	N/A
Conservative	William Beresford	2,292	36.1	N/A
Whig	John Gurdon Rebow	1,555	24.5	New
Whig	Fiske Goodeve Fiske-Harrison	36	0.6	New
Majority		737	11.6	N/A
Turnout		3,178 (est)	58.2 (est)	N/A
Registered electors		5,461		
Conservative hold		Swing	N/A	
Conservative hold		Swing	N/A	

General election 1841: North Essex
Party	Candidate	Votes	%	±%
Conservative	John Tyrell	Unopposed		
Conservative	Charles Gray Round	Unopposed		
Registered electors		5,771		
Conservative hold				
Conservative hold				

=== Elections in the 1830s ===
General election 1837: North Essex
Party	Candidate	Votes	%
Conservative	John Tyrell	Unopposed	
Conservative	Charles Gray Round	Unopposed	
Registered electors		5,899	
Conservative hold			
Conservative hold			

By-election, 4 May 1835: North Essex
Party	Candidate	Votes	%
Conservative	John Payne Elwes	2,406	63.9
Whig	John Disney	1,357	36.1
Majority		1,049	27.8
Turnout		3,763	70.3
Registered electors		5,351	
Conservative hold			

- Caused by Baring's elevation to the peerage, becoming 1st Baron Ashburton

General election 1835: North Essex
Party	Candidate	Votes	%
Conservative	John Tyrell	Unopposed	
Conservative	Alexander Baring	Unopposed	
Registered electors		5,351	
Conservative hold			
Conservative hold			

General election 1832: North Essex
Party	Candidate	Votes	%
Tory	John Tyrell	2,448	27.8
Tory	Alexander Baring	2,280	25.9
Whig	Charles Western	2,244	25.5
Whig	Thomas Brand	1,840	20.8
Majority		36	0.4
Turnout		4,513	87.4
Registered electors		5,163	
Tory win (new seat)			
Tory win (new seat)			

== See also ==
- List of parliamentary constituencies in Essex

== Notes and references ==
Parliament of the United Kingdom
Preceded by Essex	UK Parliament constituency 1832 – 1868	Succeeded by Essex Eastern; Essex Western
Preceded by Colchester North; Colchester South and Maldon	UK Parliament constituency 1997 – 2010	Succeeded by Harwich and North Essex
