= Charles Gray Round =

British politician (1797–1867)

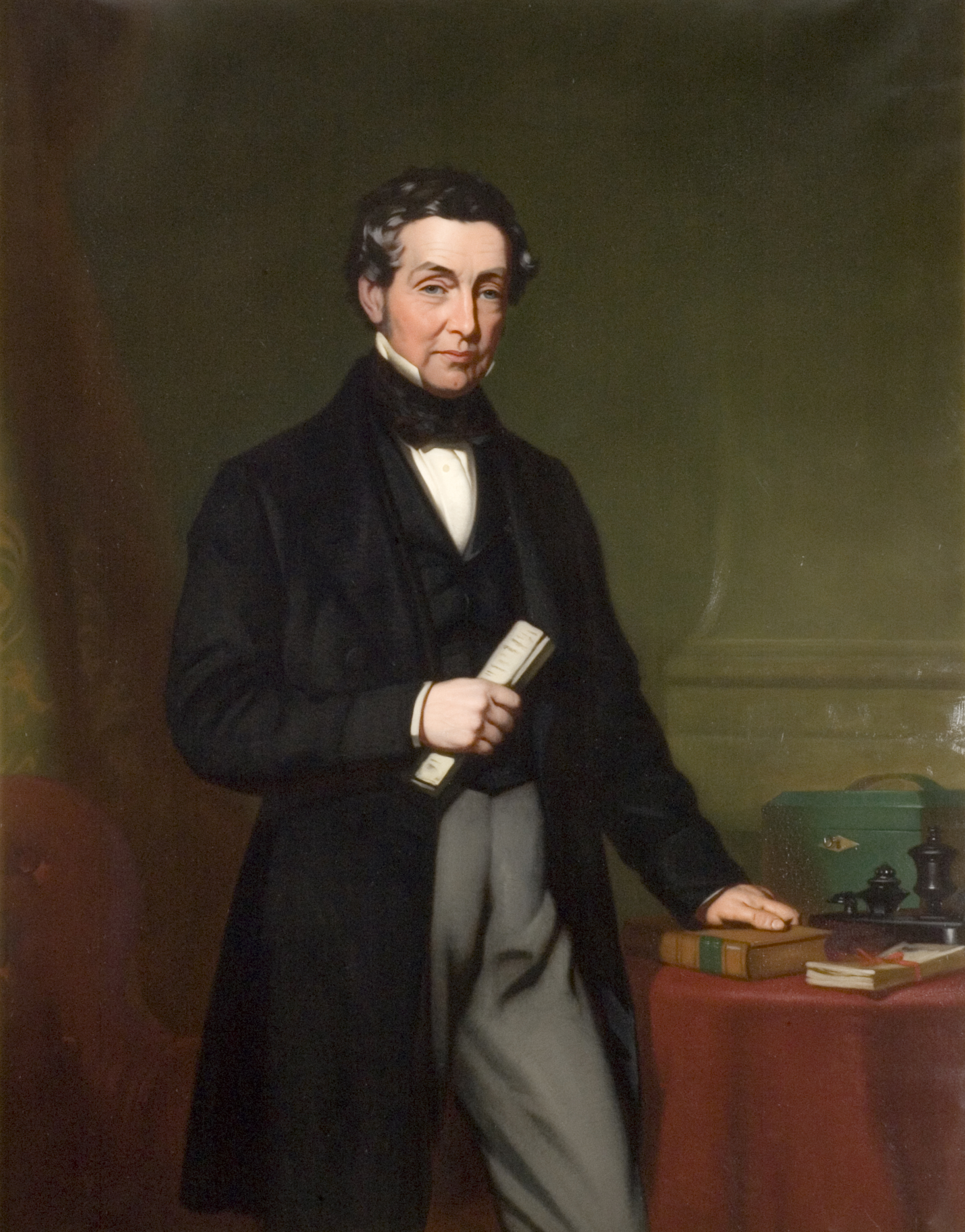
- Round in 1863
- Born: 28 January 1797
- Died: 1 December 1867 (aged 70)

Charles Gray Round (28 January 1797 – 1 December 1867) was a barrister and the Conservative Member of Parliament (MP) for North Essex 1837–47. He also served as Recorder for Colchester, and as a magistrate and Deputy Lieutenant for Essex, as well as being a substantial local landowner and notable.

Round was educated at Winchester then Felsted (1810–1814), and graduated from Balliol College, Oxford, with first-class honours in classics in 1818 (BA) and 1821 (MA); he was called to the Bar by Lincoln's Inn in 1822.The round was always regarded as "a very able and intelligent lawyer", though not an eloquent pleader. He served as Chairman of the Essex Quarter Sessions, a post which he held for twenty years, and as Recorder of Colchester for nearly thirty. Round was an active magistrate for Essex and a warm supporter of most of the religious societies connected with the Church of England. He was also a founding member of the Essex Archaeological Society. Politically, he was elected unopposed to become an MP for North Essex in 1837, a seat which he held until 1847, when he stood for the University of Oxford, but failed to win that, losing to William Ewart Gladstone.

Round inherited from his father (also Charles) a great deal of land in Colchester, including Birch Hall, which he rebuilt 1843–8 as "a handsome mansion in the plain Ionic order". In the same way, he took possession of Colchester Castle and the accompanying Castle Park, originally under the ownership of Charles Gray. Round resigned his position as Recorder of Colchester in 1863. In 1838 he married his wife Emma Sarah (1819–1892); together they "promoted religion and education in the parish [of Birch], were diligent in charitable works, and provided some housing for estate workers." Having no children, he was succeeded as owner of Birch Hall by his nephew James Round. In his will, he provided for trustees to build sea defences near Clacton-on-Sea.

Parliament of the United Kingdom
Preceded by John Payne Elwes; Sir John Tyrell	Member of Parliament for North Essex; 1837–1847; With: Sir John Tyrell	Succeeded by William Beresford; Sir John Tyrell
