= Colchester North (constituency) =

UK Parliament constituency (1983–1997)

- Former borough constituency for the House of Commons
- Colchester North, showing boundaries used from 1983–1997
- County: Essex

1983–1997
- Seats: One
- Created from: Colchester and Harwich
- Replaced by: Colchester and North Essex

North Colchester was a Borough Constituency in Essex, represented in the House of Commons of the Parliament of the United Kingdom from 1983 until 1997. It elected one Member of Parliament (MP) by the first past the post system of election.

== History ==
This seat was created for the 1983 general election from parts of the abolished Colchester constituency and parts of the Harwich constituency. It was abolished at the next redistribution which came into effect for the 1997 general election, when Colchester was re-established as a borough constituency and a new county constituency of North Essex was created.

It was a safe Conservative seat throughout its existence.

== Boundaries ==
- The Borough of Colchester wards of Boxted and Langham, Castle, Copford and Eight Ash Green, Dedham, Fordham, Great and Little Horkesley, Great Tey, Highwoods Lexden, Marks Tey, Mile End, St Andrew's, St Anne's, St John's, St Mary's, Stanway, West Bergholt, and Wivenhoe; and
- The District of Tendring wards of Alresford Thorrington and Frating, Ardleigh, Brightlingsea East, Brightlingsea West, Elmstead, Great Bentley, Great Bromley Little Bromley and Little Bentley, Lawford and Manningtree, and Mistley.

The seat was created in 1983 by dividing the Colchester constituency. It took in the northern parts of the town of Colchester, including the town centre, plus the rural areas to the north of Colchester, and south of either the Stour estuary or the Suffolk border. It also included western parts of the Harwich constituency, including Wivenhoe and Brightlingsea.

The seat was abolished in 1997, with the parts of the town being included in the re-established constituency of Colchester and remaining areas being included in the new constituency of North Essex, a seat surrounding Colchester.

== Members of Parliament ==
Election	Member	Party
1983	Sir Antony Buck	Conservative
1992	Bernard Jenkin	Conservative
1997	constituency abolished: see Colchester & North Essex	

== Elections ==
1979 notional result
Party	Vote	%
Conservative	31,439	55.3
Labour	16,160	28.4
Liberal	9,124	16.0
Others	157	0.3
Turnout	56,880	
Electorate		

=== Elections in the 1980s ===
General election 1983: Colchester North
Party	Candidate	Votes	%	±%
Conservative	Antony Buck	29,921	53.0	−2.3
Liberal	Ronald Montgomerie	14,873	26.3	+10.3
Labour	Raymond Allen	10,397	18.4	−10.0
Ind. Conservative	Derek Wilkinson	784	1.4	New
Independent	Roger Davies	510	0.9	New
Majority		15,048	26.6	−0.2
Turnout		56,485	73.1	−3.5
Conservative win (new seat)				

General election 1987: Colchester North
Party	Candidate	Votes	%	±%
Conservative	Antony Buck	32,747	52.3	−0.7
SDP	Alan Hayman	19,124	30.5	+4.2
Labour	Roderic Green	10,768	17.2	−1.2
Majority		13,623	21.8	−4.9
Turnout		62,639	76.0	+2.9
Conservative hold		Swing	−2.5	

=== Elections in the 1990s ===
General election 1992: Colchester North
Party	Candidate	Votes	%	±%
Conservative	Bernard Jenkin	35,123	51.5	−0.8
Liberal Democrats	James Raven	18,721	27.4	−3.1
Labour	David Lee	13,870	20.3	+3.1
Green	Muhammed Shabeer	372	0.5	New
Natural Law	Michael Mears	238	0.4	New
Majority		16,402	24.1	+2.3
Turnout		68,414	79.1	+3.1
Conservative hold		Swing	+1.2	

== See also ==
- List of parliamentary constituencies in Essex
