= List of Queen's Counsel in England and Wales appointed in 1950 =

A Queen's Counsel (post-nominal QC), or King's Counsel (post-nominal KC) during the reign of a king, is an eminent lawyer (usually a barrister or advocate) who is appointed by the monarch to be one of "Her Majesty's Counsel learned in the law." The term is recognised as an honorific. Appointments are made from within the legal profession on the basis of merit rather than a particular level of experience. Members have the privilege of sitting within the bar of court. As members wear silk gowns of a particular design (see court dress), appointment as Queen's Counsel is known informally as taking silk, and hence QCs are often colloquially called silks.

The rank emerged in the sixteenth century, but came to prominence over the course of the nineteenth. Appointment was open to barristers only until 1995. The first women KCs had been appointed only in 1949. In 1950, 17 people were appointed, all of them men.

== 1950 ==
=== 18 April 1950 ===
Name	Inns of Court	University	Notes	Ref
Arthur Edgar Jalland	Gray's Inn (1911)	University of Manchester	Born in 1889, Jalland served in the First World War between 1915 and 1919. He was a magistrate in Lancashire and in Preston Borough, and became Chairman of the county's Court of Quarter Sessions in 1950, and simultaneously was appointed Recorder of Preston and Judge of the Borough Court of Pleas. He had also unsuccessfully contested Knutsford for the Liberal Party in the 1929 general election. Jalland died in 1958.	
William Latey, CBE	Middle Temple (1916)	—	Latey was born in 1885, the son of John Latey, editor of The Illustrated London News. He was war correspondent for the News Chronicle (1914–15), then served in the Ministry of Munitions (1916–18), and was appointed an MBE in 1918. He began practising as a barrister on the Oxford Circuit the following year, specialising in probate and divorce law, becoming an authority on the latter and authoring Latey on Divorce (1952). During the Second World War, he was an ARP Warden for the Temple and City, and was appointed a bencher in 1947. From 1952 to 1964 he was a Divorce Commissioner. He became Treasurer of the Middle Temple in 1966, and served as President of the Medico-Legal Society (1956–57). He was chairman of the Legal Board of National Marriage Guidance Council, and appointed CBE in 1965. He died in 1976. His son, Sir John Latey, was a judge.	
Geoffrey Glynn Blackledge, MC	Middle Temple (1920)	St John's College, Oxford	Usually known by his middle name Glynn, Blackledge was born in 1894 and served in the First World War (earning the Military Cross with bar) before graduating. He practised on the Northern Circuit, with his career briefly interrupted by a period as stipendiary magistrate for Liverpool (1946–47). He was appointed Presiding Judge of the Liverpool Court of Passage in 1950, serving until his death in 1964.	
Professor Seymour Gonne Vesey-FitzGerald	Gray's Inn (1921)	Keble College, Oxford	Vesey-FitzGerald was born in 1884, the son of a senior member of the Indian Civil Service (ICS). After graduating, he joined the ICS in 1907, serving in the Central Provinces as a registrar, district judge and eventually legal secretary to the Legislative Council. He returned to England in 1923 and taught "oriental laws" in Oxford and London throughout the 1920s and early 1930s. In 1927, he became Lecturer in Hindu and Mohamedan Laws at the Inns of Court. In 1935, he became Supervisor of the Indian Civil Service Probationers at the University of London, and two years later became Reader in Indian Law. Between 1946 and 1951, he was then Professor of Oriental Laws at the School of Oriental and African Studies and was head of the department from 1948, and Dean of the University of London's Faculty of Law between 1948 and 1951, when he retired. He died three years later.	
Constantine John Colombos	Middle Temple (1923)	Royal University, Malta École des Sciences Politiques Institut des Hautes Études Internationales University of London	Born in 1886, Colombos was usually known by his middle name John. He was legal adviser to the Admiral Commander-in-Chief of Allied Fleets in the Mediterranean Sea during the First World War, and was legal adviser to the Government of Malta in London between 1922 and 1927, and again between 1932 and 1933. He was a Professor of the Hague Academy of International Law, and edited The International Law of the Sea in 1967. He died in 1968.	
Cyril Pearce Harvey	Inner Temple (1923)	Brasenose College, Oxford	Harvey was born in 1900 to Sir Ernest Maes Harvey. He was Vinerian Scholar at Oxford in 1923. He published a number of legal textbooks, including the 13th edition of Smith's Leading Cases (jointly, 1929), Solon, or the Price of Justice (1931), and The Advocate's Devil (1958). During the Second World War, he served in the Civil Defence Service and then the War Office, and finally with the British Council. In 1947 he was appointed Legal Assessor to the General Medical Council and the Dental Board. In 1950, he was also appointed Deputy Chairman of the Court of Quarter Sessions for Bedfordshire. He was member of a number of boards and chaired the Medical Appeals Tribunal from 1966. He died suddenly, while still in each of these posts, in 1968.	
Sir Stephen Gerald Howard	Lincoln's Inn (1924)	Balliol College, Oxford	Born in 1896 and brought up in East Anglia, Howard's father Major Stephen Howard was the Liberal MP for Sudbury. After serving in the Royal Flying Corps and then Royal Air Force during the First World War, he completed his studies and then established a busy practice in criminal law. He was Recorder of Bury St Edmunds between 1943 and 1945 and then a senior Prosecuting Counsel from 1945 to 1950. He was also successively Recorder of Ipswich (1947–58) and Southend (1958–61), as well as Chairman of the Courts of Quarter Sessions for Cambridgeshire (1947–52) and East and West Suffolk (1952–61), as well as the Conservative MP for Cambridgeshire between 1950 and 1961. In 1961, he was appointed a High Court Judge, serving until retirement in 1971. He had been knighted on his elevation to the High Court, and died in 1973.	
Sir Richard Everard Augustine Elwes, OBE, TD	Inner Temple (1925)	Christ Church, Oxford	Born in 1901, Elwes was the son of the singer Gervase Elwes. He practised on the Midland Circuit, and was standing counsel to the Jockey Club between 1938 and 1950. His practise was interrupted by service in the Second World War (he was appointed OBE in 1945). Elwes was then made a bencher of the Inner Temple in 1948, and served as Recorder of Nortampton (1946–58) and Chairman of the Court of Quarter Sessions for Rutland (1946–54), Derbyshire (1954–58) and Bedfordshire (1957–58), before he was appointed a High Court Judge in 1958, serving until he retired in 1966, two years before his death. He had been knighted in 1958.	
James Gonville Strangman	Middle Temple (1927)	Trinity Hall, Cambridge	Born in 1902, he was the son of Sir Thomas Strangman, QC. He was made a bencher of the Middle Temple in 1958, and died in 1977.	
Sir John Galway Foster, KBE	Inner Temple (1927)	New College, Oxford	Born in 1904, Foster was the son of an Army general. He was elected to a Prize Fellowship at All Souls College, Oxford, in 1924, and became a non-resident fellow after his call to the bar. He then established a successful common law practice, serving as Recorder of Dudley (1936–38) and Oxford (1938–51, 1956–64). He also lectured in private international law at the University of Oxford in the late 1930s, and saw service in the Second World War, initially as the first secretary of the British Embassy in Washington, and later as legal adviser to the Supreme Headquarters Allied Expeditionary Force (with the rank of brigadier). He served as the Conservative MP for Northwich between 1945 and 1974, and his political career included three years as parliamentary under-secretary of state at the Commonwealth Relations Office (1951–54). He was appointed a KBE in 1964, and died in 1982.	
Harold Richard Bowman Adie-Shepherd	Inner Temple (1928)	Trinity College, Oxford	Born in 1904, the son of a barrister, Adie-Shepherd was known by the surname Shepherd for some of his career. He practised on the North-Eastern Circuit, although his career was interrupted by service in the Army during the Second World War. In 1948, he was appointed Recorder of Pontefract, then in 1950 Recorder of York and Solicitor-General of the County Palatine of Durham. He was appointed a County Court Judge in 1955, serving until 1962. Two years later, he was appointed Deputy Chairman of the Court of Quarter Sessions of Cornwall, and then served as Chairman between 1966 and 1971. He was appointed a Recorder of the Crown Court in 1972, and retired the following year. He died in 1979.	
David Karmel, CBE	Gray's Inn (1928)	Trinity College, Dublin	Born in 1907, Karmel practised on the Northern Circuit; his career was interrupted by service in the Western Desert Campaign, Tunisia, Italy and Yugoslavia in the Second World War, during which he was injured and rose to the rank of Major. He was appointed Recorder of Wigan in 1952, serving for ten years. In 1970, he became Deputy Chairman of the Court of Quarter Sessions of Gloucestershire, but that appointment ended when he became Recorder of the Crown Court in 1972. He retired in 1979. He served on or chaired several committees of inquiry, and was a bencher (from 1954) and then Treasurer (in 1970) of Gray's Inn. Appointed a CBE in 1967, he died in 1982.	
Sir Geoffrey Lawrence	Middle Temple (1930)	New College, Oxford	Lawrence was born in 1902, and was a pupil of Eric Neve; he practised on the South Eastern Circuit. He was Recorder of Tenterden between 1948 and 1951, and sat on the Royal Commission on Marriage and Divorce in 1951. He was appointed Recorder of Canterbury the following year, serving until he became Chairman of the National Incomes Commission in 1962; he occupied the chair until 1965 when he was appointed a High Court Judge. In 1957, he led the defence for John Bodkin Adams. He had also been Chairman of the General Council of the Bar (1960-62) and was appointed Chairman of the Court of Quarter Sessions for West Sussex in 1953. Knighted in 1963, he died in 1967.	
Sir Roy Mickel Wilson	Gray's Inn (1931)	University of Glasgow Balliol College, Oxford	Wilson was born in 1903, the son of a priest, and grew up in Scotland. He practised as a barrister on the South-Eastern Circuit, although his legal career was interrupted by service in the Second World War, wherein he rose to the rank of Brigadier. In 1950, he was appointed Recorder of Faversham, serving for only a year; he became Recorder of Croydon in 1957, but left that office in 1961 when he became President of the Industrial Court (having previously spent three years on the Industrial Disputes Tribunal). He remained President until 1976 (by which time the court had been renamed the Industrial Arbitration Board). He was involved in a number of committees of inquiry and in 1971 was acting Chairman of the Race Relations Board. Elected a Bencher of Gray's Inn in 1958, he served as its Treasurer in 1973, and had been knighted eleven years earlier. He died in 1982.	
Sir Bernard Joseph Maxwell MacKenna	Inner Temple (1932)	University College, Dublin New College, Oxford	Commonly known as Sir Brian MacKenna, he was born in 1905 in Ireland. While at the University of Oxford, he was secretary of the Union. After being called, he completed a pupillage with James Tucker, and then joined Walter Monckton's chambers. He was appointed a High Court Judge in 1961, taking the customary knighthood and serving until retirement in 1977. He became a bencher of the Inner Temple in 1958. MacKenna was a member of the Howard League for Penal Reform, and produced a report, Justice in Prison, in 1983. He died in 1989.	
Geoffrey Henry Cecil Bing, CMG	Inner Temple (1934)	Lincoln College, Oxford Princeton University	Bing was born in 1909 and, after serving as a signals officer in the Second World War, he was elected Labour MP for Hornchurch in 1945, and remained in the seat until 1955. He had also been carrying out advocacy work in Africa, and had been called to the bar in the Gold Coast in 1950 and Nigeria in 1954; the year after losing his parliamentary seat, he was appointed Constitutional Adviser to the Prime Minister of the newly independent state of Ghana, and then served as Attorney-General of the country from 1957 to 1961. When the Prime Minister, Kwame Nkrumah, was deposed in 1966, Bing was imprisoned briefly then ejected from Ghana, returning to Britain and publishing his memoirs and advising the Irish University Press. He had been appointed a CMG in 1960, and died in 1977.	

Source: The London Gazette, 18 April 1950 (no. 38888), p. 1873

=== 27 July 1950 ===
Name	Inns of Court	University	Notes	Ref
Leslie Charles Graham-Dixon	Inner Temple (1925)	St John's College, Oxford	Graham-Dixon (usually known by his middle name Charles) was born in 1901; his father was a senior civil servant in the Board of Inland Revenue. After his call to the bar, he spent time tutoring for the bar examination, but eventually began practising on the revenue bar (joining the chambers of Raymond Needham, KC), and operating on the Western Circuit. He became head of chambers after taking silk and retired in 1956. He then joined the boards of several shipping companies, including Shell Tanker Finance, John Holt and Westminster Dredging, and served as Chairman (1973–81) and President (1981–84) of the Charing Cross Hospital Medical School. He died in 1986.	

Source: The London Gazette, 4 August 1950 (no. 38985), p. 4005
