= The Yellow Chief =

Book by Thomas Mayne Reid

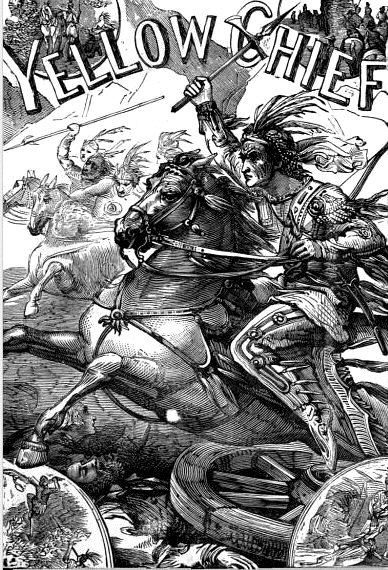
- Author: Thomas Mayne Reid
- Language: English
- Genre: English Western
- Set in: Mississippi and the American West, 1849
- Publication date: 1870
- Publication place: England
- Media type: Print, paperback
- Pages: 168
- ISBN: 978-1-512-15452-8

The Yellow Chief: A Romance of the Rocky Mountains is a novel by Thomas Mayne Reid written in 1869, converging frontier fiction with anti-slavery messages. The Yellow Chief tells the story of a southern mulatto slave who runs away to become a Cheyenne Indian chief in the Rocky Mountains, seeking revenge on his cruel plantation owners as they emigrate to the West.

The novel was published in 1870 as a pulp western dime novel in London, and was afterwards published as Part II of Mayne Reid's The White Squaw (1871). It is one of 75 adventure "romance" novels that Mayne Reid wrote in his lifetime, including The Rifle Rangers (1850), The White Chief (1855), The Scalp Hunters (1856), and The Headless Horseman (1866).

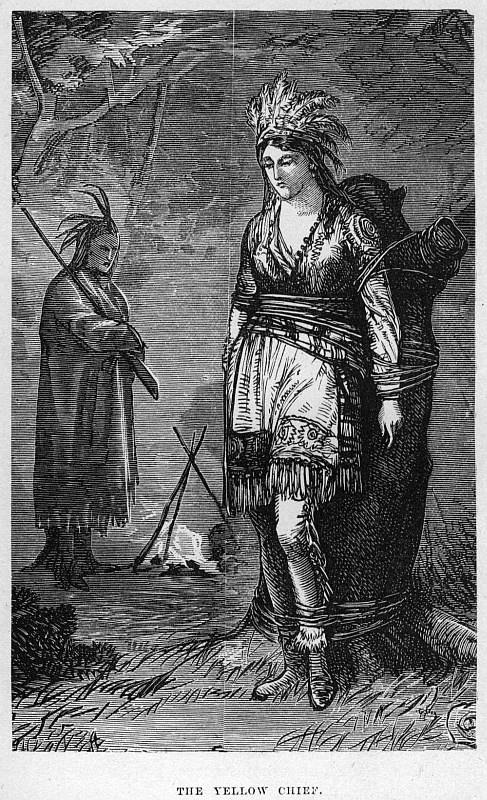
The Yellow Chief

== Plot summary ==
Starting in Vicksburg, Mississippi preceding the abolition of slavery, The Yellow Chief begins on the plantation of the Blackadder family. Blount Blackadder, the 18-year-old son of the plantation owner Squire Blackadder, punishes a mulatto slave, Blue Dick, out of revenge over a girl, a quadroon named Sylvia. The 'punishment of the pump', a frequent act at the Blackadder plantation, consists of placing the victims head directly under the painfully cold stream of a water pump. Daughter Clara Blackadder watches the shameful punishment, only daydreaming about the Irishmen Edward O'Neil, who her father forbids her from marrying. Whilst murdering Sylvia in the woods in the process, Blue Dick proceeds to escape the plantation, never to return.

After experiencing bankruptcy five years later, the Blackadders sell their plantation and travel west in covered wagons to start a new life in California. A Choctaw Indian named Woboga guides them through the journey, and later turns out to be a spy for the antagonist Cheyenne Indian group led by Yellow Chief, who wants secret revenge against the Blackadder family. Through Woboga, Yellow Chief and his men find the ex-Mississippi planters corralled in an enclosed gorge in the Rocky Mountains by Bijou Creek of the South Platte River. They attack with gunfire, killing Squire Blackadder in the process, and capture the rest of the group as prisoners.

Meanwhile, Edward O'Neil, who has since left Mississippi to the Colorado mountains to escape his heartbreak over Clara Blackadder, travels as a fur trapper with his experienced, older companion, 'Lije Orton. The two trappers overhear Yellow Chief's attack of the corralled emigrants and decide to receive help from the mountain men of Fort Saint Vrain. O'Neil sees that Clara is of those imprisoned and becomes determined to save her.

Yellow Chief's men create a wooden cross to emulate crucifixion for their white captives. As the Yellow Chief first administers a "dose" of cold water onto the "crucified" Blount Blackadder, the plantation emigrants begin to feel suspicious. It isn't until Mr. Snively sees the Yellow Chief wash off his war paint in a waterfall, revealing his mulatto "yellow" skin, that the Yellow Chief's true identity as Blue Dick is revealed. Another secret reveals itself when the Yellow Chief threatens Clara Blackadder to the "punishment of the pump." Old Nan, an elder of the Blackadder slaves, comes forth to inform Blue Dick (the Yellow Chief) that he and Clara are blood siblings through master-slave relations. Squire Blackadder's relation to Blue Dick only maddens him even more, as Blue Dick threatens to make Clara his slave.

After much strategic planning, 'Lije Orton, Edward O'Neil, and mountain man Black Harris track down Yellow Chief and his Cheyenne troupe and manage to kill them all with little difficulty. The emigrants continue their journey to California, leaving Clara behind to start a life on the east coast with O'Neil. Together they raise children and are often visited by 'Lije to be updated on the mountain life.

== Main characters ==
- Squire Blackadder - owner of the Blackadder plantation, as well as Blount and Clara's father. Originally from Delaware, Blackadder bought his plantation on Choctaw land, referred to as the "Choctaw Purchase." A ruthless slaveholder and the only main character to be murdered under the hands of the Yellow Chief.
- Blount Blackadder - Squire's oldest son, who initializes the story with Blue Dick's punishment of the pump at the plantation.
- Clara Blackadder - the modest, unmarried Blackadder daughter, desperately in-love with Edward O'Neil.
- Mr. Snively - overseer of the plantation.
- Blue Dick (Yellow Chief) - the mistreated mulatto slave, who runs away and gains power over a Cheyenne tribe as their leader, Yellow Chief, in the Rocky Mountains.
- Edward O'Neil - a young Irishmen desperately in love with Clara Blackadder. He moves to the Rocky Mountains to live the life of a fur trapper.
- Woboga - the Blackadder's Choctaw guide into the West, who is later revealed as a spy for Yellow Chief's revenge.
- 'Lije Orton - a 60-year-old experienced fur trapper of the Rocky Mountains, originally from Tennessee. He is the only character besides the slaves written with broken speech, implying a lack of education. He is the companion to Edward O'Neil.
- Black Harris - an infamous mountain man and frequenter of the trading post, Fort St. Vrain, who later helps kill the Yellow Chief.
- Old Nan - old, wise woman of the Blackadder slave community. She reveals that Clara and Blue Dick are blood-related.

== Historical background ==
This novel was written in 1869, but begins in Mississippi in 1849 before the abolition of slavery. While describing the cruelties of the punishment of the pump, Mayne Reid recalls that this " is a tale of twenty years ago."

In the years that The Yellow Chief takes place, America was undergoing the California Gold Rush, alluded in the Blackadder's emigration to California from Mississippi. The publication of Uncle Tom's Cabin around the mid 19th century beckoned a rise in anti-slavery novels such as this one.

European immigration of workers was booming during this time in American history, as well as industrialization through the railroad system. The invasion of railroads into the western plains is mentioned at the very end of The Yellow Chief, as 'Lije Orton comes to visit Clara and Edward in Manhattan. By describing the rails as "penetrating" the prairies, readers can assume Mayne Reid's bitter reaction to industrialization, as his romantic view of America's uncharted territories reigns throughout the novel.

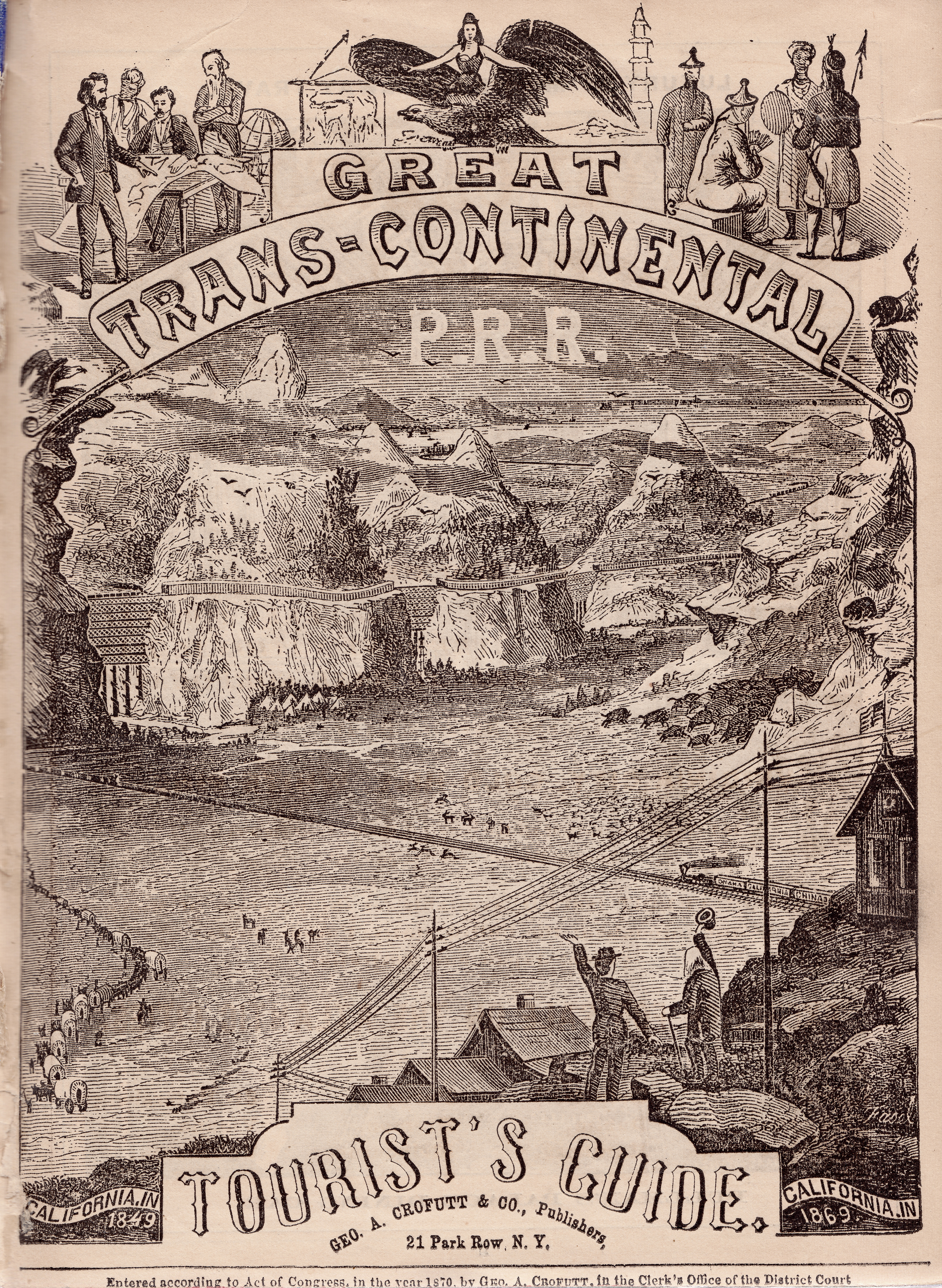
Frontispiece of George A. Crofutt's Great Trans-Continental P.R.R. Tourist's Guide 1870

The events of The Yellow Chief precede the Civil War, but still allude to issues of anti-slavery and abolitionism, as events of tension such as Bleeding Kansas were going on at this time in American history.

The real geographical places of the Bijou Creek at the South Platte River of The Yellow Chief are regions of the unorganized territories of the United States, east of the Rocky Mountains. This would later become Colorado. Although led by fictional characters in the novel, Fort Saint Vrain was a real notable fur trading post in this region. Native American tribes and mountain men engaged in trade at this structure, which would employ James Beckworth and Sacajewea's son Jean Baptiste Charbonneau in its existence.

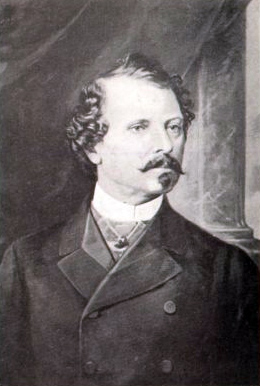
Captain Mayne Reid

=== Allusions to Mayne Reid's life ===
Mayne Reid often based his novels off of real events and experiences. The novelist was born in Ballyrony, Ireland, similarly to The Yellow Chief's Irish-born protagonist, Edward O'Neil. Mayne Reid immigrated to America in 1839 and become a provisions clerk in Louisiana. Soon after in 1841, he moved to Natchez, Mississippi, close to the hypothetical site of the Blackadder's plantation.

Before moving to Philadelphia and becoming a lieutenant in the Mexican–American War in 1846, Mayne Reid is said to have travelled West on personal adventures. Although he claims to have based his western adventure novels off of these real experiences, there is no real evidence that Mayne Reid's western travels ever actually happened. According to close friend Edgar Allan Poe, Mayne Reid was a "colossal but most picturesque liar."

Preceding the Mexican–American War, Mayne Reid spent his money freely and declined into bankruptcy in 1866. The Blackadder family similarly experienced bankruptcy at the beginning of the novel, forcing them to move westward.

Mayne Reid relates messages of anti-slavery in his novel when describing the inhumane punishments of slaves given by the Blackadder planters. This relates to Mayne Reid's experiences in Louisiana, where he was said to have left his job after refusing to whip slaves.

== Genre ==
The Yellow Chief combines many popular adventure fiction narratives of the 19th century, including plantation narrative, frontier fiction, and the Indian attack narrative. Through this cross of genres, Mayne Reid was able to show a broad overview of America's expansion, slavery abolition, and sharing the land with Indians. Like many of Mayne Reid's novels, it contributed to the growing interest and myth of the American "Wild West".

The novel follows convention of imperial adventure fiction, exemplifying values of the genre such as the nationalist and sacrificing male hero, a damsel in distress, and the dangers of 'the other', as well as a desire to conquer them. Although the slaves are mostly written into the novel with a sympathetic tone, the Indians are portrayed as hostile and frightening, with the racially ambiguous Yellow Chief being the most feared. While characterizing retribution attacks on the romanticized natural lands of the Rocky Mountains, Mayne Reid also adds to the imperial adventure fiction tradition of toiling fear of retaliation with desire of the foreign romance.

== Plot ==
Many 19th century pulp western authors, Mayne Reid included, often returned to the same set trope of plot, characters, and conclusions in their novels. Mayne Reid was most noted for marrying off all his characters at the end of his stories. The Yellow Chief also features a common plot theme of Mayne Reid, in which a heroine's "weak brother" becomes caught in the clutches of a villain seeking revenge.

Although The Yellow Chief was a dime novel, the cliff hangers throughout the plot seem to occur in the tradition of serial novels of 19th century literature. Many unrealistic coincidences and plot twists are presented to the reader, such as Blue Dick, the Blackadders, and O'Neil ending up in the same area of the Rocky Mountains. As a very short read, only 168 pages long, the different developments of action don't have much build-up. The plot of the novel, although maybe suspenseful for a 19th-century reader, comes across as frivolous and implausible to the contemporary reader.

== English Western ==
Mayne Reid's novels were published in London, placing The Yellow Chief under the tradition of English Western literature. Comparative to westerns by American novelists, English Westerns were largely written for a juvenile audience, with an emphasis on physical dangers of the West and a high interest in experiences such as the Gold Rush and trapper life. English Westerns also abide to the theme of the West being a temporary place to visit - as the male hero, such as Edward O'Neil, is given the opportunity to learn and "wrest a good living" on the frontier, and then immediately returning to society.

With an outsider's perspective, Mayne Reid's English Western will often glorify the scenery of the West, but also falsely portray imaginary aspects of the environment and Native people, such as physical descriptions of the Cheyenne people adorning full-face paint. English Western authors have little knowledge of the animals of the American West and their behaviors, often presenting them in a very menacing way, such as the horse stampeded at the end of The Yellow Chief.

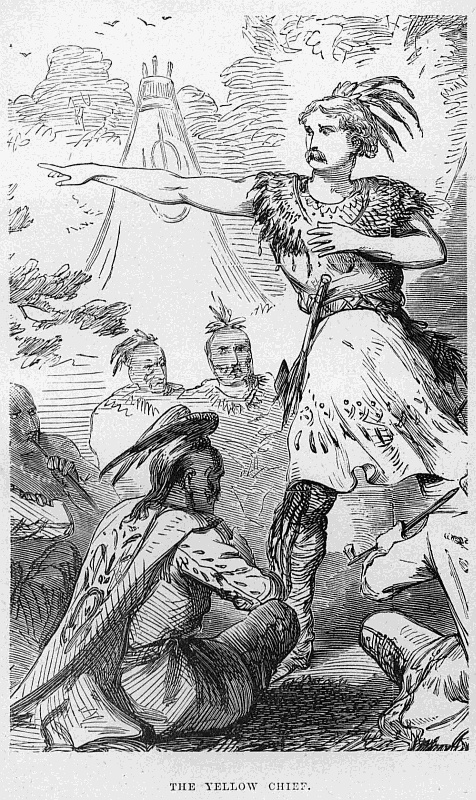
The Yellow Chief

== Anti-Slavery & Minority Presence ==
The Yellow Chief is considered a work of anti-slavery literature. The novel deals with issues of perceptions of race in 19th century America, questioning the humanity and hypocrisy of slaveholders who adhere abusive punishments onto slaves; especially since Blue Dick is blood-related to the Blackadders, and racially ambiguous. Mayne Reid was born in Ireland and considered a British novelist, giving The Yellow Chief a foreign and critical perspective on these American race relations.

Mayne Reid's most famous anti-slavery novel, The Quadroon A Lover's Adventures in Louisiana (1856) was about an interracial love story and the inner turmoil of a white man who has fallen in love with a quadroon slave woman. In the disclaimer of The Quadroon, Mayne Reid states the purpose of his anti-slavery novel is "neither to aid the abolitionist, nor glorify the planter". Another novel, Osceola, The Seminole, or The Half Blood deals with an Indian leader, similar to Yellow Chief, whose ancestry consisted of a white plantation owner and a Seminole mother.

Mayne Reid's experiences in America as a slave overseer in the south, an Indian fighter, and an officer in the Mexican War gave him the authority to write these stories, and also lent him the conventional biases of white American society. The Yellow Chief holds harmful descriptions of African Americans and American Indians as savages and animalistic. When describing a slave boy running away on all fours from the grip of the Yellow Chief, Mayne Reid emulates ideas of Darwin and the devolution of humans. Often referring to the Cheyennes as "skunks", Mayne Reid characterizes the Yellow Chief's gang as frequent drunks, making them easily manipulated to the fur trader's attacks.

== Critical reception ==
Mayne Reid was a household name for literature in the 19th century. His American West novels were extremely popular among boys, and many of his books have been translated into different languages such as Polish and Russian. Mayne Reid is especially popular and appreciated in the former Soviet Union. United States President Theodore Roosevelt was a huge fan of Mayne Reid. Some attribute Mayne Reid's novels to Roosevelt's pursuits of American national park expansion during his presidency.

Many English Westerns, such as those written by Mayne Reid's contemporaries G.A. Henty and R.M. Ballantyne, are criticized for being Christian imperialistic instruction manuals for "youthful empire-builders," and not actually caring about the West. While Mayne Reid's later juvenile novels have also been critiqued as poor, his early romances for adults such as The Yellow Chief have been praised as his best. Through a naturalist focus on the frontier and aware warnings of human mistreatment, The Yellow Chief can be seen as one of the more meaningful examples of 19th century English Westerns.
