= John Latey =

John Latey may refer to:

- John Latey (journalist) (1842–1902), British journalist and writer
- John Latey (judge) (1914–1999), British judge
