= Sir Roy Wilson =

Sir Roy Wilson may refer to:

- Roy Wilson (British politician) (1876–1942)
- Roy Wilson (lawyer) (1903–1982)
