= Joseph Schacht =

British-German Islamic scholar (1902–1969)

Joseph Franz Schacht
- Born: 15 March 1902; Ratibor, Province of Silesia, German Empire
- Died: 1 August 1969 (aged 67); Englewood, New Jersey, United States
- Occupations: Historian, academic

Joseph Franz Schacht (German pronunciation: [ˈjoːzɛf ʃaxt], 15 March 1902 – 1 August 1969) was a British-German professor of Arabic and Islam at Columbia University in New York. He was the leading Western scholar in the areas of Islamic law and hadith studies, whose Origins of Muhammadan Jurisprudence (1950) is still considered a centrally important work on the subject. The author of many articles in the first and second editions of the Encyclopaedia of Islam, Schacht also co-edited the second edition of The Legacy of Islam and authored a textbook titled An Introduction to Islamic Law (1964).

== Life and career ==
Schacht was born into a Catholic family but, with a zeal for study, became at an early age a student in a Hebrew school. In Breslau and Leipzig he studied Semitic languages, Greek, and Latin, under professors including Gotthelf Bergsträßer.

In 1924 he published his Habilitations-Schrift, Das kitab al-hiial fil-fiqh (Buch d. Rechtskniffe) des abū Hātim Mahmūd ibn al-Hasan al-Qazuīnī, with translation and commentary.

In 1925 he obtained his first academic position at the Albert-Ludwigs-Universität Freiburg in Breisgau. In 1927 he became there a professor extraordinarius, making him the youngest professor in all of Germany, and in 1929 a professor ordinarius of Semitic languages. In 1932 he was appointed a professor at the University of Königsberg. But in 1934, without being directly threatened or persecuted, Schacht, as a strong opponent of the Nazi regime, went to Cairo, where he taught until 1939 as a professor. At the outbreak of World War II in 1939, he happened to be in England, where he offered his services to the British government and worked for the BBC. In 1947 he became a British citizen.

Schacht taught at Oxford University from 1946. In 1954 he moved to the Netherlands and taught at the University of Leiden. In the academic year 1957–1958, he taught at Columbia University, where, in 1959 he became a full professor of Arabic and Islamic studies. He remained at Columbia until his retirement in 1969 as professor emeritus.

One of Schacht's major contributions to the history of early Islam is the recognition that Hadith probably stems from those in whom the different traditions of the past converge, and this convergence Schacht describes as "common link". This concept was later used productively by many other orientalists.

== Thought ==
=== Theory of Islamic law ===
Schacht argued that Islamic law was not as classical Islamic jurisprudence taught,

- the product of an ordered following of four sources/components (which in order of importance/senority were):
1. the Quran,
2. the Sunnah (the body of traditional social and legal custom and practice of the Islamic community),
3. Qiyas (the process of deductive analogy), and
4. Ijma (the consensus/agreement of Muslim scholars);
- neither did its chronology follow a direct path of Allah-> Muhammad-> Companions-> Followers-> Fiqh,
- nor was fiqh development centered shortly after Muhammad's death in the city (Medina) where he had established his state and where memory and traditions of him were the strongest.

Rather the law arose from historical development of three different "sunnas" — bodies of custom, rules and law — operating in parallel during the period of the Umayyad Caliphate.

1. The "pre-Islamic sunnah" of Arabia,
2. the mixed custom-administrative law sunnah of the distant provinces" of the Umayyads, and later
3. the "living traditions" of the newly formed Islamic schools.

Unification of Islamic legal thought (so that only one sunnah remained) occurred under the legal scholar Al-Shafi‘i (767-820), when the ahadith of Muhammad became pre-eminent (except for the Quran). The most important of the schools of Islamic law developed in Kufa in Mesopotamia, according to Schacht's research, and its legal precepts spread to other cities such as Medina.

Beginning around 100 A.H. (720 CE), ahadith of Muhammad "began to be fabricated", forming the Islamic Sunnah as it is known today. While scholars recognized that many ahadith were false and attempted to weed these out with ʻilm al-ḥadīth, this was in vain as most if not all are inauthentic. According to Schacht, with the exception of "a few modifications dictated by the Qur'an", the Islamic "Sunna" is the same as the "sunna" of "pre-Mohammed Arabia". One example of the power of traditional law was that under the caliphate, theft was punished by flogging, even though the Qur'an had prescribed maiming/amputation.

Schacht argues that in part the fabrication of ahadith came from "a literary convention, which found particular favor in Iraq", whereby authors/scholars would put their "own doctrine or work under the aegis of an ancient authority." The ultimate prestigious "ancient authority" in this context was Muhammad and "around 120 A.H." scholars in Kufa, "followed in a few years by the Medinese" began falsely ascribing "their new doctrines back to earlier jurists", and over time extended them back to Muhammad. Schacht also blames the religious fervor of those who "detested" use of Qiyas and Ijma. Providing suspicious justification for the "Traditionist" fabricators were ahadith such as, "sayings attributed to me which agree with the Qur'an go back to me, whether I actually said them or not." Though false, the forgeries could also be justified as recognizing the "final legitimacy of what the prophet Muhammad did and said.

=== Evidence of late creation ===
As evidence that most ahadith were created after 100 A.H., Schacht notes that:

1. all authentic early writings of Islamic law are virtually devoid of any mention of ahadith of Muhammad;
2. the early doctrines of the schools of law were "almost always traced" to an earlier jurist or to the Sahabah ("companions" of Muhammad) but "virtually never" to Muhammad;
3. but "the best way of proving that a tradition did not exist at a certain time" according to Schacht, was "to show that it is not used as a legal argument in a discussion which would have made reference to it imperative, if it had existed." In reply to the argument that jurists, etc. may not have used a legal argument in a discussion because they had not known about it, Schacht states:

a. communications in the Islamic empire at that time were good enough for "doctrines and views" to "spread easily and quickly from one juristic center to another";
b. if the behavior and utterances of Muhammad were the basis of Islamic law from the beginning of Islamic society, it is unlikely those involved in matters of law — "among the most learned and pious men of Islam" — would not know them;
c. there were not dozens but "hundreds of examples in which the disparity between an early decision and a later tradition took place". According to David F. Forte, "it goes beyond rational belief to think that these men would have been so consistently ignorant of contrary actions by the Prophet."

=== The Origins of Muhammadan Jurisprudence (book) ===
As a whole, Origins critiques the methods and standards of ḥadīth verification as they were first articulated by Al-Shafi‘i and subsequently developed by his students in the eighth and ninth centuries CE, an early and centrally important stage in the formation of Islamic jurisprudence. His research builds upon the work of important figures in the nineteenth- and twentieth-century study of Islamic law in Europe, such as Gustav Weil and Ignác Goldziher. In particular, Schacht advocates a skeptical approach to medieval forms of 'isnād criticism, which he views as fabricated and comprising the greater part of Sunni approaches to verifying Prophetic traditions of a legal nature.

==== Argument and Method ====
Schacht locates the origins of 'ilm al-ḥadīth in the eighth and ninth centuries CE, a moment in the development of Islamic legal reasoning coinciding with the professionalization of the traditionalist (muḥaddith) and jurist (faqīh) classes in the urban centers of the Middle East.

Schacht credits Imām al-Shāfiʻī, the founder of an eponymous school of Islamic jurisprudence, with "creating" "the essentials" of the theory of fiqh (the system of Islamic jurisprudence), made up of four principles/sources/components mentioned above: the Qurʾān, the ḥadīth of the Prophet Muḥammad and his Companions, scholarly consensus (ijmāʿ), analogical reasoning (qiyās).

Because the Quran has relatively few verses pertaining to fiqh, Al-Shafi‘i's system meant that "the great bulk" of the rules of the Islamic law were derived from ahadith. Schacht states that Shafi'i repeatedly insisted that "nothing" could override the authority of the Prophet, even if it was "attested only by an isolated tradition", and that if a hadith was "well-authenticated" (Ṣaḥīḥ) going back to the Islamic Prophet Muhammad, it had "precedence over the opinions of his Companions, their successors, and later authorities".

Following the work of Goldziher before him, Schacht argues that it was al-Shāfiʻī who first elevated the sunna and its constituent traditions to great legal prominence. The material importance of the Qurʾān and ḥadīth thereafter enjoyed a status comparable to that of juristic consensus, though for al-Shāfiʻī traditions credibly attributed to the Prophet were to be considered more authoritative than those of his Companions, and indeed could supersede all other sources of legal authority. Moreover, an already-existing legal standard based on such a tradition could be overturned only upon the emergence of a ḥadīth that could be more credibly attributable to the Prophet. Al-Shāfiʻī goes as far as to claim that such well-established traditions invite no debate as to their validity; their truth simply imposes itself upon the human mind, leaving no room for doubt or speculation. Schacht points out, however, that al-Shāfiʻī inconsistently applies this rule in his own work, alleging that in some cases the jurist favored 'aḥādīth transmitted from Companions that openly contradicted those attributable to the Prophet. These traditions usually included those which validated ritual practices that were either universally agreed upon or else independently verifiable (such as daily prayer), and those which disputed the legal positions of al-Shāfiʻī's opponents.

Building on this lattermost point, Schacht contends that far from constructing the standards of a legitimate epistemic enterprise al-Shāfiʻī's science of ḥadīth amounts to little more than an uncritical acceptance of Prophetic traditions which justified his own legal preferences. These same traditions, claims Schacht, could not survive a stronger program of investigation. Although the technical evaluation of traditions would continue to evolve across many generations of Muslim scholars, it seems to have largely proceeded along the lines of the deficient form of ’isnād criticism first articulated here by al-Shāfiʻī. Later in Origins Schacht presents evidence which in his estimation suggests that there was in fact a large scale fabrication of Prophetic ’isnāds in the generation preceding the life of al-Shāfiʻī's own teacher, Mālik ibn ’Anas (d. 795 CE). Even in Mālik's esteemed golden narrative chain there are suspicious gaps and obvious substitutions, sowing significant doubts as to credibility of the relationships he was said to have had with certain key transmitters. For these reasons modern scholars cannot be nearly as optimistic about the historical-analytic value of ḥadīth literature as were their medieval Muslim counterparts.

==== Reception ====
Schacht's views on this matter have come under criticism from scholars in recent decades. His notable critics include M. Muṣṭafā al-Aʻẓamī and Wael Hallaq. Al-A'zami's work On Schacht's Origins of Muhammadan Jurisprudence is a systematic response to Schacht's thesis, outlining its inconsistencies within itself, Schacht's very broad generalizations, and his continuous special pleading in the face of data. Hallaq argues that Schacht mistakenly assumes that medieval Muslims scholars held ḥadīth to be apodictically true. According to Hallaq, it is more likely the case — and indeed apparent to the careful reader upon inspecting the literature — that at least where matters of law were concerned medieval Muslim scholars judged the majority of ḥadīth as only probabilistically true. It was the epistemic sum of probable traditions, and not the assured truth of any one tradition in particular, upon which they built their legal rulings.

== Legacy ==
Scholarly reaction to Schacht's work has produced "three camps of scholars" according to Mohsen Haredy citing Wael Hallaq. Those (such as John Wansbrough, and Michael Cook) who seek to "reconfirm his conclusions", and at times going beyond them; those who endeavor to refute them (Nabia Abbott, F. Sezgin, M. Azami, Gregor Schoeler and Johann Fück) and a those "seeking to create a middle, perhaps synthesized, position between the two" (Motzki, D. Santillana, G.H. Juynboll, Fazlur Rahman and James Robson).

According to David Forte, "nearly all Western Islamic scholars agree that Schacht's evidence against the authenticity of the traditions is virtually unassailable." Supporters of his include: Maurice Gaudefroy-Demombynes, who writes that many ahadith "are apocryphal and were invented in the 8th century in order to justify innovations and tendencies which were very foreign to the intentions of the Prophet"; J. N. D. Anderson, who states most ahadith were "beyond question, fabricated"; Herbert Liebesny; and Seymour Vesey-Fitzgerald, who states "there was deliberate forgery of traditions by responsible lawyers on such a scale that no purely legal tradition of the Prophet himself can be regarded as above suspicion."

== Works ==
- Bergsträsser, Gotthelf: Grundzüge des islamischen Rechts. Editor: Joseph Schacht. Berlin-Leipzig 1935.
- Islam in Northern Nigeria. In: Studia Islamica 8 (1957) 123–146.
- Schacht, Joseph: An Introduction to Islamic Law. Oxford 1964.
- Schacht, Joseph: The Origins of Muhammadan Jurisprudence. Oxford University Press 1950, (1967 with corrections and Additions).
