= Thomas Mayne Reid =

British novelist and tutor (1818–1883)

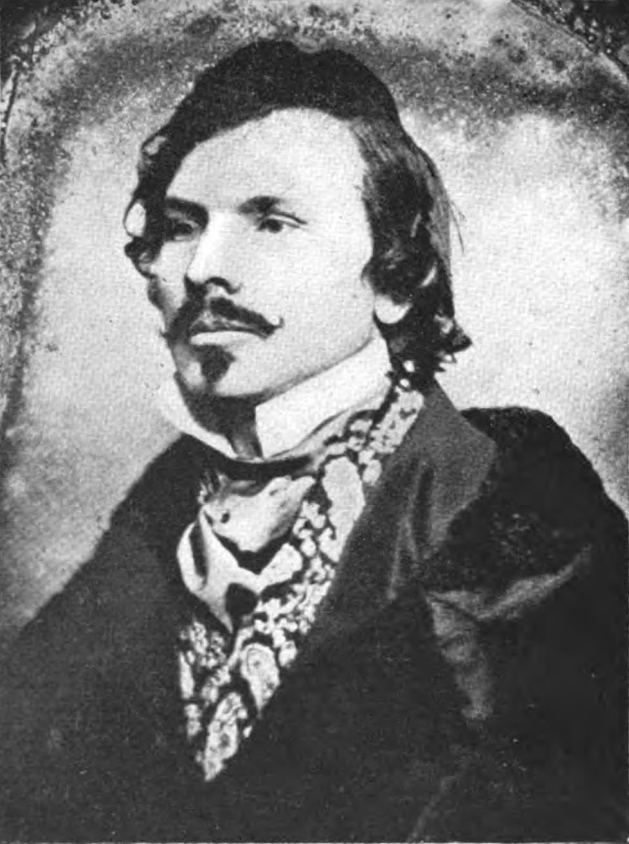
- Thomas Mayne Reid, c. 1850
- Born: 4 April 1818; Ballyroney, County Down, Ireland
- Died: 22 October 1883 (aged 65); London, England
- Occupation: Novelist
- Writing career
- Genre: Adventure
- Movement: Romanticism/Neo-romanticism

Signature
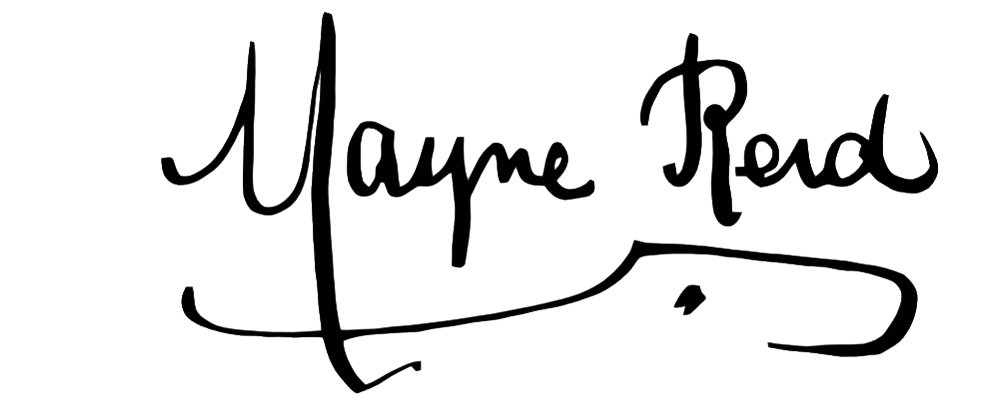

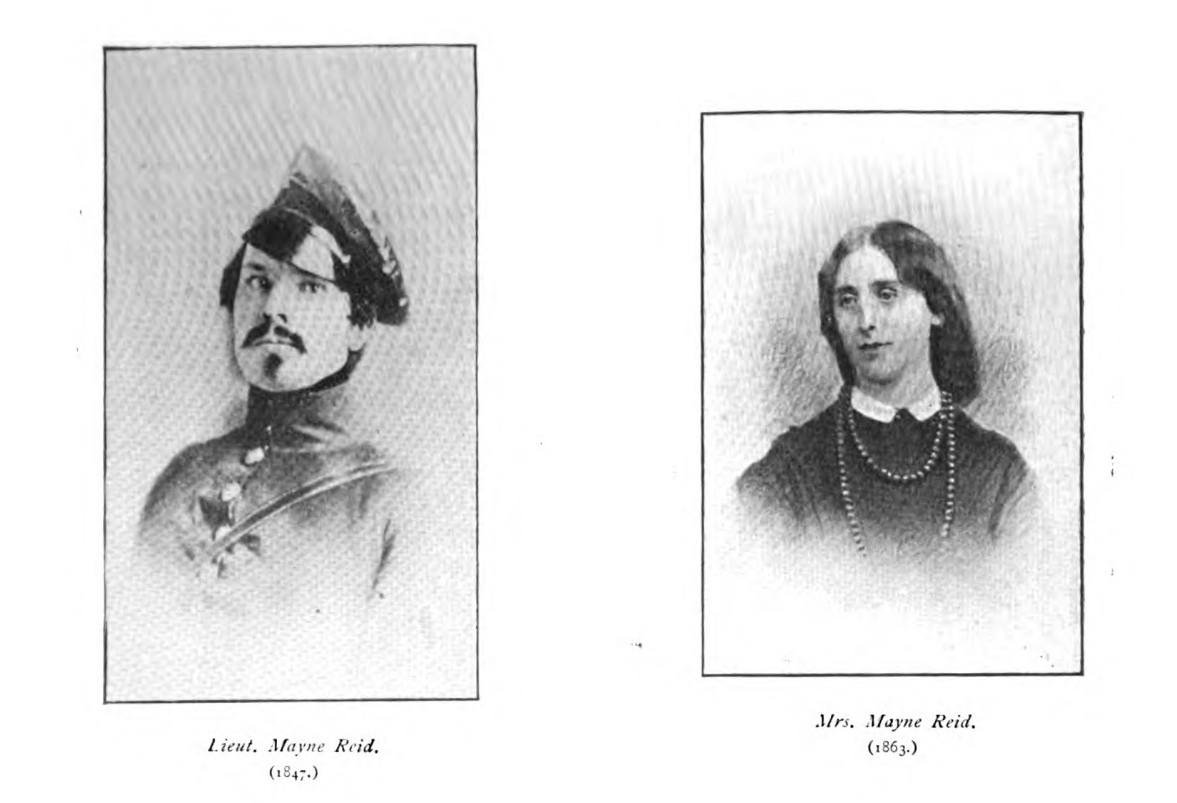
Mr. and Mrs. Mayne Reid

Thomas Mayne Reid (4 April 1818 – 22 October 1883) was an Irish British novelist who fought in the Mexican–American War (1846–1848). His many works on American life describe colonial policy in the American colonies, the horrors of slave labour, and the lives of American Indians. "Captain" Reid wrote adventure novels akin to those by Frederick Marryat (1792–1848), and Robert Louis Stevenson (1850–1894). They were set mainly in the American West, Mexico, South Africa, the Himalayas, and Jamaica. He was an admirer of Lord Byron. His novel Quadroon (1856), an anti-slavery work, was later adapted as a play entitled The Octoroon (1859) by Dion Boucicault and produced in New York.

While Reid's novels have become almost completely forgotten in the Anglosphere, they have remained popular in Eastern Europe and particularly in Russia (beginning in tsarist times), being considered a part of the canon of Western literature and being published under the category of "World Classics" along with Jack London and James Fenimore Cooper.

== Biography ==
=== Early years ===
Reid was born in Ballyroney, a hamlet near Katesbridge, County Down, in present-day Northern Ireland, the son of Rev. Thomas Mayne Reid Sr., a senior clerk of the General Assembly of the Presbyterian Church in Ireland, and his wife. His father wanted Reid to become a Presbyterian minister, and in September 1834 the youth enrolled at the Royal Belfast Academical Institution. He stayed for four years, but lacked motivation to complete his studies and graduate. He headed back to Ballyroney to teach at a school.

In December 1839 Reid boarded the Dumfriesshire, bound for New Orleans, Louisiana, arriving in January 1840. He soon found a job as a corn factor's clerk in the corn market. After six months in New Orleans, he is said to have left for refusing to whip slaves. Reid later used Louisiana as the setting of one of his successful books, an anti-slavery novel entitled The Quadroon (1856).

Reid travelled to Tennessee, where on a plantation near Nashville he tutored the children of Dr. Peyton Robertson. Some twenty years later, Reid would make mid-Tennessee the setting for his novel The Wild Huntress. After Robertson's death, Reid founded a short-lived school in Nashville.

In 1841 he found work as a clerk for a provision dealer in either Natchez, Mississippi, or Natchitoches, Louisiana (the latter seems likelier). Although Reid later he made have several trips west during this period, on which he purportedly based some of his novels, the evidence for these excursions is sparse and contradictory

=== Literary career ===
In late 1842 Reid arrived in Pittsburgh, Pennsylvania, where he began writing prose and poetry for the Pittsburgh Morning Chronicle under a pen-name, the Poor Scholar. He also apparently worked as a carrier for the paper. His earliest verifiable work is a series of epic poems called Scenes in the West Indies.

In early 1843, Reid moved to Philadelphia for three years, working as a journalist and periodically publishing poetry in Godey's Lady's Book, Graham's Magazine, the Ladies National Magazine and elsewhere, still using his Pittsburgh pseudonym. There he met Edgar Allan Poe, who became a drinking companion for a time. Poe would later call Reid "a colossal but most picturesque liar. He fibs on a surprising scale but with the finish of an artist, and that is why I listen to him attentively."

When the Mexican–American War began in the spring of 1846, Reid worked as a correspondent for the New York Herald in Newport, Rhode Island. He set one of his novels here. At this time, he added the pen-name Ecolier to the Poor Scholar.

On 23 November 1846, Reid joined the First New York Volunteer Infantry as a second lieutenant, leaving by ship with the regiment in January 1847. They camped for several weeks at Lobos Island before joining Major General Winfield Scott's invasion of Central Mexico, which began on 9 March at Vera Cruz. Reid as Ecolier was a correspondent for a New York paper, Spirit of the Times, which published his Sketches by a Skirmisher. On 13 September, at the Battle of Chapultepec, Reid received a severe thigh wound while leading a charge. He was afterward promoted to first lieutenant for bravery in battle. On 5 May 1848 he resigned his commission and in July returned to New York with his regiment.

Love's Martyr, Reid's first play, was staged at the Walnut Street Theater, Philadelphia, for five nights in October 1848. He published War Life, an account of his army service, on 27 June 1849.

Learning of the Bavarian Revolution, Reid headed for England to volunteer, but after the Atlantic crossing changed his mind and went home to Ireland instead.

He soon moved to London and in 1850 published his first novel, The Rifle Rangers. This was followed by The Scalp Hunters (1851; dedicated to Commodore Edwin W. Moore, whom he met in 1841), The Desert Home (1852), and The Boy Hunters (1853). The last, set in Texas and Louisiana, was a "juvenile scientific travelogue" that become a favourite with young Theodore Roosevelt, who became a Reid fan. That year Reid married 15-year-old Elizabeth Hyde, daughter of his publisher, G. W. Hyde, an English aristocrat and his wife.

After time off with his new bride, Reid returned to writing. He continued to base his novels on his adventures in America. Several more were successful: The White Chief (1855), The Quadroon (1856), Osceola (1858) and The Headless Horseman (1865). He spent money freely, including building in Gerrards Cross, Buckinghamshire, a sprawling "Rancho", a reproduction of a Mexican hacienda he had seen during the Mexican–American War, where he took to farming; he also purchased land adjacent to Gerrards Cross Common, demolished tenements and constructed St Huberts Cottages. This extravagance led to bankruptcy in November 1866, from which he was discharged in January 1867. That October he left London for Newport, Rhode Island, hoping to repeat his past success in the U.S.. He returned to New York in 1867 and founded the Onward Magazine there.

=== Last years ===
Reid lectured at Steinway Hall in New York and published the novel The Helpless Hand in 1868, but his popularity had declined in America. His wound from Chapultepec started to bother him and he was hospitalized for several months at St Luke Hospital in 1870. His wife hated the United States. After he was released from the hospital, they returned to England on 22 October 1870, to live at Ross on Wye, Herefordshire.

In England, Reid continued to write stories and reworked some earlier novels. "The Death Shot" was published in the Penny Illustrated Paper. In October 1874, an abscess formed on the knee of his wounded leg, leaving him unable to walk without crutches. He was joint editor with John Latey of The Boys' Illustrated News for ten months from 6 April 1881. He wrote and published in it "The Lost Mountain; a Tale of Sonora."

About this time Reid's creative energy began to flag and he lost popularity, so he turned to farming near Ross in Herefordshire. He continued to write. His last novel, No Quarter, set in the Parliamentary wars, and his last boys' book, The Land of Fire, were published after his death on 22 October 1883. He was buried in Kensal Green Cemetery, now part of London. His tombstone quotes from The Scalp Hunters: "This is 'weed prairie'; it is misnamed: It is the Garden of God."

== Influence and legacy ==
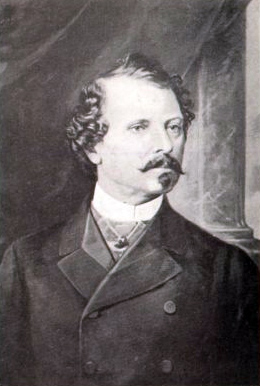
Capt. Mayne Reid, from an oil portrait, circa 1863

Books such as the Young Voyagers were highly popular, especially with boys. His tales of the American West were also popular with children across Europe and Russia. Many became popular in Polish or Russian translations, including The Rifle Rangers (1850), Scalp Hunters (1851), Boy Hunters (1853), War Trail (1851), Boy Tar (1859), and Headless Horseman (1865/6). Several Russian and Polish writers have noted the influence of his works in their childhoods.

For instance, Vladimir Nabokov recalled The Headless Horseman as a favourite adventure novel of his boyhood – "which had given him a vision of the prairies and the great open spaces and the overarching sky." At age 11, Nabokov translated The Headless Horseman into French alexandrines. Alexander Bek mentions the well-read K. K. Rokossovsky, future Marshal of the Soviet Union, referring to Reid's work in early 1942. The Polish writer Czesław Miłosz cites Russian translations of Reid as well-remembered early reading matter, by which he also learned Russian and the Cyrillic alphabet. A chapter on Reid appears in his essay collection Emperor of the Earth (1976). Anton Chekhov in Island, a Journey to Sakhalin (1893–94) mentions "Mayne Reid" in Chapter 10: "The morose, angry sea has spread itself boundlessly for thousands of versts. When a little boy has been reading Mayne Reid and his blanket falls off during the night, he starts shivering, and it is then that he dreams of such a sea."

United States President Theodore Roosevelt, in his autobiography, credits Reid with being a major early inspiration. The shy, asthmatic upper-class boy, Teddy Roosevelt, grew up to pursue naturalistic zoology and adventure travel. Russell Miller, in his biography of Arthur Conan Doyle, credits Reid as one of the writer's favourite childhood authors and a great influence on his writings.

Although Reid called himself and is listed often as Captain, Francis B. Heitman's definitive Historical Register and Dictionary of the U.S. Army shows he only reached the rank of lieutenant.

== Bibliography ==
Reid wrote about 75 novels and many short stories and sketches.

- The Rifle Rangers; or, Adventures in South Mexico (1850)
- The Scalp Hunters: A Romance of the Plain (1851)
- The Desert Home: The Adventures of a Lost Family in the Wilderness (1851)
- The Forest Exiles; or, The Perils of a Peruvian Family Amid the Wilds of the Amazon (1852)
- The Boy Hunters, or, Adventures in Search of a White Buffalo (1853)
- The Young Voyageurs: Boy Hunters in the North (1854)
- The White Chief; A Legend of North Mexico (1855)
- The Hunter's Feast; or, Conversations Around the Camp-fire (1856)
- The Bush Boys: History and Adventures of a Cape Farmer and His Family (1856)
- The Quadroon: or, A Lover's Adventures in Louisiana: in 3 volumes (1856)
- The War-trail: or, The Hunt of the Wild Horse; a Romance of the Prairie (1857)
- Ran Away to Sea (1857 : George Routledge and Sons)
- The Young Yagers, or, A Narrative of Hunting Adventures in Southern Africa (1857)
- The Plant Hunters; or, Adventures Among the Himalaya Mountains (1858)
- Osceola the Seminole, or, The Red Fawn of the Flower Land (1858)
- Wild Life; or, Adventures on the Frontier (1859)
- Odd People; or, Singular Races of Man (1860)
- Bruin: The Great Bear Hunt (1860)
- The Lone Ranch: A Tale of the Staked Plain (1860)
- The Wild Huntress; or, The Big Squatter's Vengeance (1861)
- The Maroon: A Tale of Voodoo and Obeah (1862)
- Croquet (1863)
- The Cliff Climbers (1864)
- The Boy Slaves (1865)
- The Ocean Waifs: A Story of Adventure on Land and Sea (Ticknor and Fields, 1865)
- The Headless Horseman (1866)
- The Giraffe Hunters (1867)
- Afloat in The Forest; or A Voyage Among the Tree-Tops (1867)
- The White Squaw (1868)
- The Headless Horseman: A Strange Story of Texas (1868)
- The Helpless Hand: A Tale of Backwoods Retribution (1868)
- The Planter Pirate: A Souvenir of Mississippi (1868)
- "The Child Wife: A Tale of Two Worlds" (1869)
- The Yellow Chief: A Romance of the Rocky Mountains (1869)
- The Fatal Cord (1869)
- The Castaways: A Story of Adventure in the Wilds of Borneo (1870)
- The Vee-Boers: A Tale of Adventure in Southern Africa (1870)
- The Finger of Fate (1872)
- The Death Shot; or, Tracked to Death (1873)
- The Cuban Patriot, or, The Beautiful Creole: An Episode of the Cuban Revolution (1873)
- The Death Shot (1874)
- The Giraffe Hunters (1876)
- The Flag of Distress, or A Story of the South Sea (1876)
- Gwen Wynn; A Romance of the Wye (1877)
- The Man-Eaters (1878)
- The Specter Barque: A Tale of the Pacific (1879)
- The Captain of the Rifles; or, The Queen of the Lakes: A Romance of the Mexican Valley (1879)
- The Land Pirates, or, The League of Devil's Island: A Tale of the Mississippi (1879)
- The Ocean Hunters, or, The Chase of the Leviathan: A Romance of Perilous Adventure (1881)
- Blue Dick, or, The Yellow Chief's Vengeance: A Romance of the Rocky Mountains (1883)
- The Hunters' Feast (serial 1854, book 1883)
- Gaspar, the Gaucho, or, Lost on the Pampas: A Tale of the Gran Chaco (1883)
- The Island Pirate: A Tale of the Mississippi (1884)
- The Land of Fire: A Tale of Adventure (1885)
- The Lost Mountain: A Tale of Sonora (1885)
- The Free Lances: A Romance of the Mexican Valley (1888)
- The Tiger Hunter: A Hero in Spite of Himself (1889)
- No Quarter! (1890)
- The White Gauntlet (1892)
- The Guerilla Chief and Other Tales
- The Bandolero, A Marriage among the Mountains
- The Boy Tar
- The Child Wife
- Wood Rangers: The Trappers of Sonora

== Sources ==
- Naughton, Yulia Pushkarevskaya; Naughton, Gerald David (2013). ""Westward Went I in Search of Romance": The Transnational Reception of Thomas Mayne Reid's Western Novels". CEA Critic. 75 (2): 142–157. doi:10.1353/cea.2013.0015. ISSN 2327-5898.
