= John Latey (judge) =

English barrister and judge

The Right Honourable Sir John Latey MBE

Justice of the High Court
- In office 1965–1989

Personal details
- Born: John Brinsmead Latey; 7 March 1914; Cricklewood, London
- Died: 24 April 1999 (aged 85); Adderbury, Oxfordshire
- Spouse: Betty Margaret Beresford (m. 1932–1999)
- Children: 2
- Education: Westminster School; Christ Church, Oxford

Sir John Brinsmead Latey, MBE, PC (7 March 1914 – 24 April 1999) was a British judge. A divorce and family law specialist, Latey served for twenty-four years on the High Court bench, at a time of radical change within English divorce law.

== Biography ==
Born in London, Latey was the son of the divorce barrister William Latey QC and the grandson of the journalist John Latey. He was educated at Westminster School and Christ Church, Oxford, where he took a Third in Jurisprudence in 1935. He was called to the bar by the Middle Temple in 1936.

Initially refused for wartime service due to poor eyesight, Latey was commissioned into the Royal Army Pay Corps in 1942, and subsequently transferred to the Judge Advocate's Department. He was appointed a MBE (Military Division) in 1943.

After the War he returned to the bar, and was appointed a Queen's Counsel in 1957. In 1965, on the recommendation of Lord Gardiner, Latey was appointed to the High Court and assigned to the Probate, Divorce and Admiralty Division, receiving the customary knighthood. He was appointed to the Privy Council in 1986, and retired from the bench in 1989. In 1965–67, he chaired a committee that reviewed reducing the UK's age of majority from 21 to 18. The committee's recommendation was accepted in the Family Law Reform Act of 1969.
