= The Headless Horseman (novel) =

1866 novel by Mayne Reid

The Headless Horseman or A Strange Tale of Texas
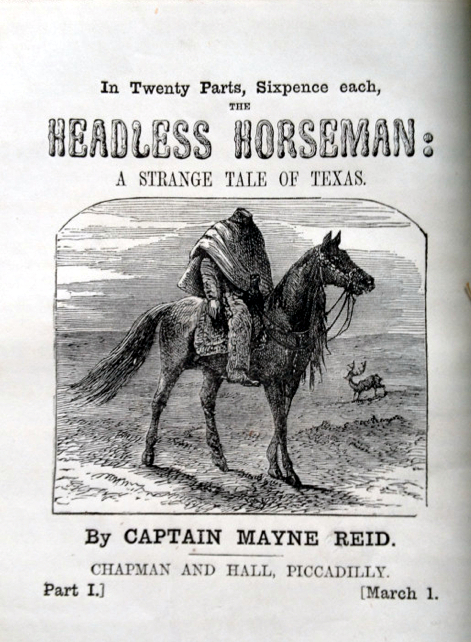
- Author: Mayne Reid
- Language: English
- Publication date: 1865–1866
- Publication place: America
- Media type: Print
- ISBN: 0-548-26531-3

The Headless Horseman is a novel by Mayne Reid, first published in monthly serialized form during 1865 and 1866, and subsequently published as a book in 1866, based on the author's adventures in the United States. "The Headless Horseman" or "A Strange Tale of Texas" was set in Texas and based on a south Texas folk tale.

== Story ==
The Headless Horseman is a story about an Irish adventurer and hero in the War with Mexico. First Lt. Reid, writing as "Captain Reid," penned a series of popular novels and attributed his Headless Horseman idea to a south Texas folk tale. Vladimir Nabokov recalled The Headless Horseman as a favorite adventure novel of his childhood years: "which had given him a vision of the prairies and the great open spaces and the overarching sky." At 11, Nabokov even translated The Headless Horseman into French alexandrines.

The story takes place in Texas soon after the Mexican–American War (1846–1848). Louise Poindexter, a beautiful newcomer, is courted by two men – the arrogant and vindictive Cassius Calhoun and the dashing but poor mustanger Maurice Gerald. Calhoun plots to eliminate his rival when tragedy strikes: Louise's brother, the young Henry Poindexter, is murdered. All clues point to Maurice Gerald as the assassin. At the same time, a headless rider is spotted in the environs of the Poindexter plantation.

== Main characters ==
- Maurice Gerald: a horse catcher (mustanger), who loves Louise Poindexter
- Louise Poindexter: Henry Poindexter's sister, who loves Maurice Gerald
- Henry Poindexter: Louise Poindexter's brother, who goes missing
- Captain Cassius Calhoun: Louise and Henry Poindexter's cousin
- Zebulon "Zeb" Stump: a hunter and Maurice Gerald's friend
- Phelim O'Neill: Maurice Gerald's servant and foster brother
- Woodley Poindexter: the father of Henry and Louise Poindexter
- Isidora: a Mexican who loved Maurice Gerald
- Miguel Diaz: a Mexican who hates Maurice and loved Isidora

== Origin of the novel ==
The novel was reportedly inspired by Creed Taylor's (1820–1906) true story of El Muerto, the Headless Horseman. Taylor was a veteran of the Texas Revolution, the Mexican–American War, and the American Civil War. He was also an Indian fighter, and was involved in the Sutton–Taylor feud, once considered the state's longest and deadliest feud.

Historian J. Warren Hunter had numerous discussions with Taylor at the Taylor home in Kimble County. Among the many recollections that Taylor conveyed to Hunter was a particularly outrageous one which involved his cronies Alexander Anderson "Bigfoot" Wallace and John McPeters. Taylor claimed that the event occurred in 1848. Wallace was a survivor of the doomed Mier Expedition who had become a famed Indian fighter. McPeters fought at the Battle of San Jacinto, although he is almost forgotten today. Both men were Texas Rangers commanded by the fierce Mabry "Mustang" Gray (1817–1848).

Creed's story appears in Hunter's 1898 manuscript The Life of Creed Taylor. Bigfoot and McPeters tracked and killed a number of Mexican horse thieves near the Nueces, south of Uvalde, and Wallace decided to use the ringleader's body as a warning to others. Bigfoot decapitated the dead man, called Vuavis or Vidal, and the two put his body on a wild stallion. They thrust his head into his sombrero, secured by a strap and tied to the pommel of the saddle. Then they set the horse loose to roam the hilly countryside.

Creed did not place himself in the story, but he did know the horse thief who had lost his head. Taylor's friend Bate Berry captured Lt. Vuavis who was a deserter from the Siege of Bexar (December 1835). Creed watched as Vuavis willingly spilled all his Mexican military information to Berry, who had a reputation for scalping enemies. They finally released the shaken captive.

Years later, Vuavis (alias Vidal) and his gang began terrorizing south Texas ranchers and stealing their cattle. It was then that Bigfoot and McPeters got on his trail and ended his career. Travelers and soldiers at Fort Inge near Uvalde were soon reporting sightings of a headless rider.

== Various narratives ==
The original story spawned various retellings. After Mayne Reid, James T. DeShields was the next interpreter. A dry-goods salesman, he was known for one novel, Cynthia Ann Parker. DeShields wrote pieces for the "Fort Worth Press" based on material he bought from old Texans; and his sometimes exaggerated articles were presented as factual.

In 1906, J. Warren Hunter sold his Taylor interview manuscript to DeShields, who lightly rewrote parts. 21 years after Hunter's death, he published Tall Men with Long Rifles, an account of Taylor's adventures in the Texas Revolution.

In 1924, J. Warren Hunter's son, J. Marvin Hunter (editor of Frontier Times), took his turn. He personalized crimes of Vidal's rustlers, who were now stealing horses from Creed Taylor. The younger Hunter vividly sketched events, while changing the time to 1850, the year of a sweeping Indian raid that drained frontier manpower, leaving few defenders against bandits. John McPeters disappeared from the narrative altogether. The younger Hunter declared that Capt. Reid's novel was based on fact.

Folklorist J. Frank Dobie changed the tale in his 1928 Tales of Old Time Texas, suggesting the headless rider was once a "ghostly guard of the mine of the long-abandoned Candelaria Mission on the Nueces to protect it from profane prospectors".

In 2022, screenwriter and author Alcario Cary Cadena wrote El Muerto: Texas Headless Horseman, his feature-length script. In the same year, he produced a short film with the same title.

== Adaptations ==
The Headless Horseman, a 1972 Soviet-Cuban co-production film directed by Vladimir Vajnshtok and starring Ludmila Savelyeva and Oleg Vidov.

El Muerto; Texas Headless Horseman, a 2022 short film directed and written by Alcario Cary Cadena. Film starred Santiago Villalobos, Aileen Corpos, Michael Cristian, Mario Aguilar, Felipe Martinez, Nathan Hodgkins, and Alcario Cary Cadena.
