= William Latey =

William Latey, CBE, QC (12 February 1885 – 28 February 1976) was an English barrister and Special Divorce Commissioner.

== Biography ==
Latey was born in 1885, the son of John Latey, editor of The Illustrated London News. He was war correspondent for the News Chronicle (1914–15), then served in the Ministry of Munitions (1916–18), and was appointed an MBE in 1918.

He began practising as a barrister on the Oxford Circuit the following year, specialising in probate and divorce law, becoming an authority on the latter and authoring Latey on Divorce (1952). During the Second World War, he was an ARP Warden for the Temple and City, and was appointed a bencher in 1947.

From 1952 to 1964 he was a Divorce Commissioner. He became Treasurer of the Middle Temple in 1966, and served as President of the Medico-Legal Society (1956–57). He was chairman of the Legal Board of National Marriage Guidance Council, and appointed CBE in 1965. He died in 1976.

His son, Sir John Latey, was a judge.
