= The Rifle Rangers: or Adventures in South Mexico =

1850 novel by Captain Mayne Reid

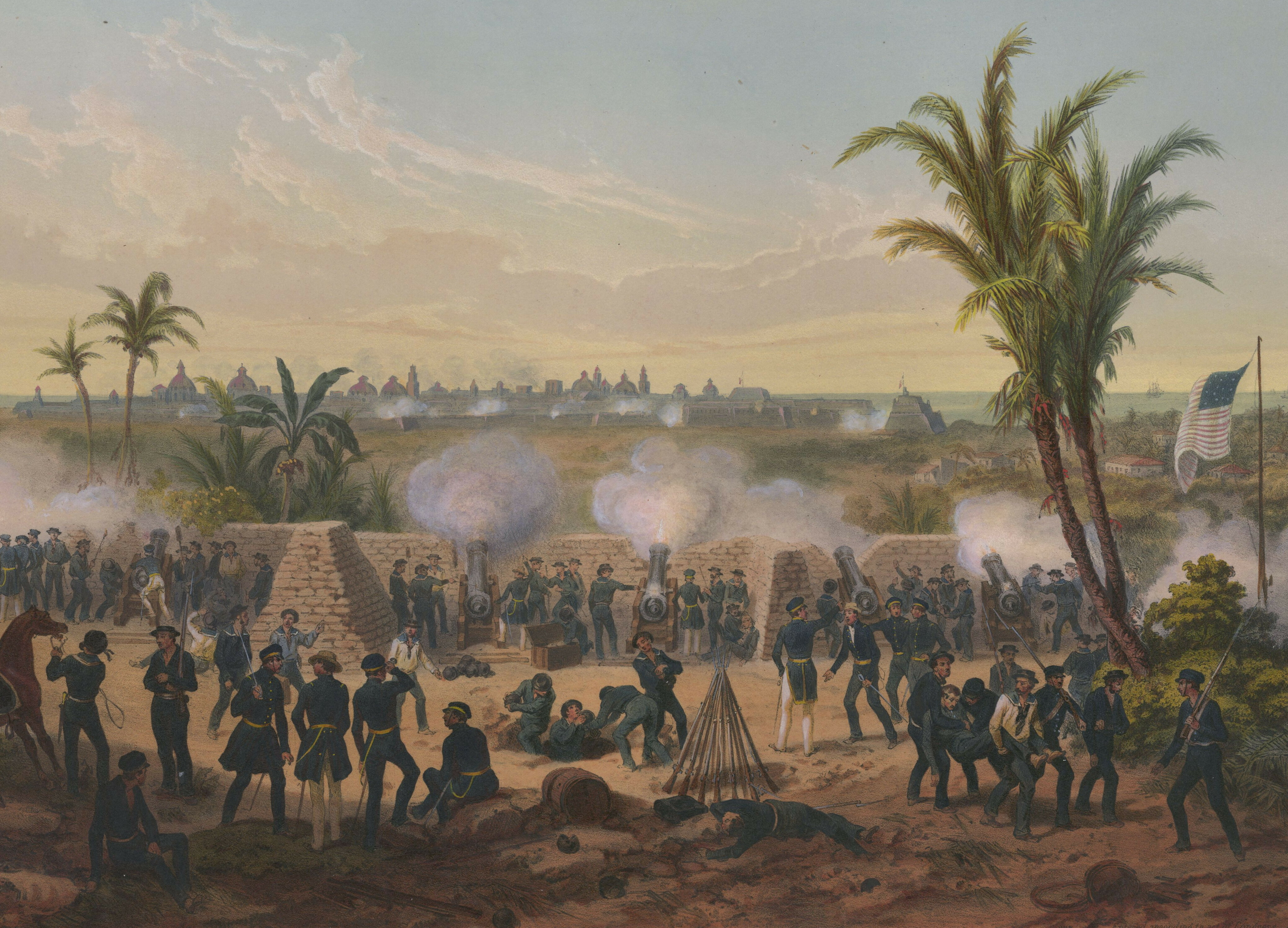
The siege of Veracruz

The Rifle Rangers or Adventures in South Mexico (1850) is a novel by Thomas Mayne Reid, set in Vera Cruz, Mexico, during the Mexican War (1846–1848).

The novel depicts the plight of American soldiers stationed in Mexico during the war and their effect on the native population. It follows the life of protagonist Captain Jack Haller as he helms the newly formed American battalion, dubbed the "Rifle Rangers". Accompanying Haller is a small band of fellow soldiers whom he leads on several missions through the Tierra Caliente portion of Mexico. The Rifle Rangers was Reid's first novel and is reflective of the author's wartime duty as a lieutenant in the First New York Volunteer Infantry, with which he traveled to the parts of Mexico described in the novel.

== Plot summary ==
The region of Anahuac

The novel opens with a narrator describing the beauty of the Land of Anahuac, with its picturesque, valleys, mountains, plains, and rolling landscapes. We learn the narrator is in the “Mexican gulf, a beautiful land but the people are unfavorable in their ideas of moral and material condition.” The narrator spends much of the opening chapters discussing the setting with positive natural imagery, depicting interior Mexico as quite romantic. He determines the division of Mexico into three regions: caliente, templada, and fria (hot, temperate and cold.) This is where his adventures begin.

The narrator has a short retrospective memory of New Orleans in which he saves an old mountain trapper friend named Bob Lincoln. We find out the narrator is named Captain Jack Haller. Cpt. Haller and Lincoln go to a volunteer meeting where the Captain signs up for volunteer service. Haller meets an old friend, "a young cotton planter-a free, dashing spirit" named Clayley and a sword-fight between Haller and a man named Dubrosc breaks out. Haller wins the sword-fight and becomes captain of the company of volunteers. Clayley is affected first lieutenant. The company is mustered into the service of the US government, and is named an independent corps dubbed the Rifle Rangers.

On orders, Cpt. Haller leads the company to the island of Lobos, fifty miles north of Vera Cruz to prepare for the Mexican War. After training for a period of time, the troops at Lobos re-embark and prepare a siege of Vera Cruz. In front of the city is the fortress-castle of San Juan de Ulloa. Two forts surround it on the north and south, Concepcion and Santiago respectively. At daybreak, the Rifle Rangers start chasing the enemy through the ridges behind Vera Cruz. They eventually climb the hill of Orizava, above the city of Vera Cruz and atop it they see the City of the True Cross. Guns start firing on the company, so the company holds. A Mexican horseman rides through the ranks into the hills, to a fort called Porto Nuevo, from which the guns were shooting; it is Dubrosc, but he disappears as quickly as he appears.

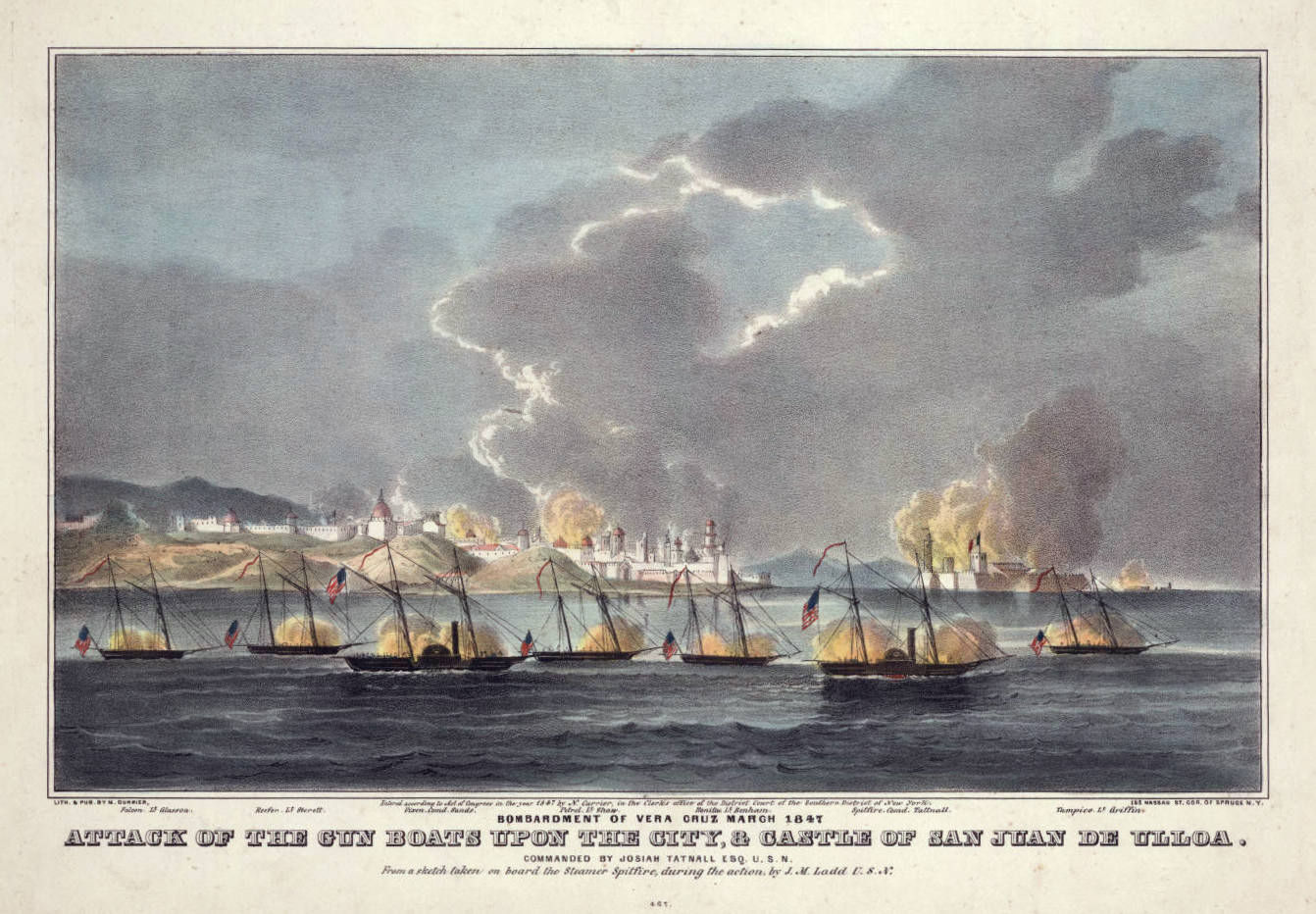
The Attack of the Gun Boats, San Juan de Ulloa

At the newly made camp, Major Blossom instructs Haller to find mules in the country for the soldiers. After a day touring the land, Cpt. Haller meets a small boy named "Little Jack" and his mustang, "Twidget", who join Haller's central crew. On their ride, Haller climbs a butte to see a forest that leads to a meadow with cattle aplenty. The company starts on a trail through forest, well hidden by underbrush and thickets. At the end of the trail they come upon a house in a clearing, and Haller continues to examine it alone. When he enters the clearing, Haller sees an unprecedented house that resembles a large birdcage made of bamboo. Nearby, he sees two girls swimming and being attacked by a cayman. He and his company save them. The father of the girls invites the men to dinner. He is named Don Cosme Rosales.

After dinner, the soldiers learn Don Cosme is a subterranean. He lives underground for the hottest part of the year. He introduces the soldiers to his wife and daughters. After a short conversation with the Don's family, one of the daughters expresses a wish to see her brother, Narcisso, who is returning from Vera Cruz soon. Major Blossom then delivers the news that her brother is likely not coming home because the Americans encircle Vera Cruz in anticipation of bombarding it. Don Cosme worries for the safety of his son, Narcisso. Haller explains that there is a Spanish ship in Vera Cruz that can save his son. Haller and the Don establish a contract where Haller receives all of Don Cosme's mules if he escorts Don Cosme to the Spanish ship. Don Cosme directs the soldiers towards the herd of mules.

The soldiers start corralling the mules when they notice a band of Indian soldiers approaching, called guerilleros. A battle ensues and one of Haller's men dies. When Haller reaches his fellow soldier's body, he sees the deserter Dubrosc from Lobos on his horse nearby. The soldiers realize they are trapped in the corral. The Mexicans outnumber them and escape is impossible. Haller decides to send Raoul, a trustworthy French cavalryman back to camp on the Major's speedy horse Hercules to ask for reinforcements. The soldiers notice the Mexicans are bringing down a cannon. Haller rallies his troops in response. Lincoln grabs Major Blossom's Prussian-made long distance rifle and kills one of the enemy artillerists in one shot from 800 yards away. Lincoln then kills another artillerist. After that, the artillery moves further away and the Mexicans bring in a Howitzer cannon. Realizing their dire situation, the Rifle Rangers decide to retreat via the mules they corralled. In a harrowing escape, Haller is lassoed by the neck and flung from his horse. Lincoln saves Haller by slicing the rope while the rest of the Mexicans run off when seeing the advancing American army, thanks to Raoul's courage.

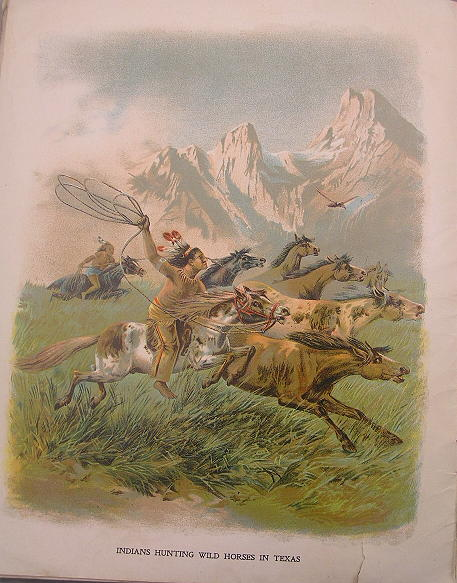
Guerrilleros

As the soldiers ride back to Vera Cruz, they learn all communications between the city and the oncoming armies is prohibited. Don Cosme realizes nothing can be done to save his son. Haller promises him he will save Narcisso personally. Haller and Raoul sneak into the town under the guarded parapet archways through the aqueduct tunnels. They rise to walk on the streets and are stopped by a Mexican street patrol. They are arrested and tried, and found guilty of treason and are sentenced to be garroted. Then American bombs start falling on Vera Cruz. The men are thrown back in jail but Raoul breaks off his cuffs and frees Haller. A shell makes a hole in the roof so the men escape and find Don Cosme's son. All 3 escape via the tunnels and return to Don Cosme's house. After several days, Vera Cruz falls to the Americans. Haller brings Clayley, Lincoln, Chane, Raoul and Little Jack to Don Cosme's house. On the way, they see the bodies of several disfigured soldiers. A man runs forward, but Lincoln kills him. Upon examining Don Cosme's house, the men are ambushed by guerilleros and taken prisoner. They see Dubrosc among the captors. Suddenly Lincoln jumps up and attacks Dubrosc with his rifle, then runs through the thicket into the woods.

Raoul recognizes one of the guerilleros and realizes they are going to Cenobio's hacienda. Cenobia is a local smuggler that Raoul used to work with. The soldiers know whence they are headed but are blindfolded on their mules. Along the route, a woman stuffs a note into Haller's mouth, which he later reads when the company stops. It says his restraints are to be cut that evening and he must do his best to escape. Haller and his men learn that Narcisso is still in the area; the note Haller receives was delivered by Narcisso; the man Lincoln killed earlier was an ally sent to warn the Haller's company of the guerillero attack. The men enjoy a last meal at Cenobio's hacienda before being hanged. As the guerilleros dance, Guadalupe gives Haller a knife with which he frees himself and his men. Haller learns it was his lovely Guadalupe that saved them, not Narcisso. Soon thereafter, Lincoln shows up and helps Haller jointly cut a hole in the adobe cell. The men escape unharmed, but are chased by Spanish blood hounds.

They fight the blood hounds on a cliff and win. The pursuers from the hacienda arrive. Lincoln shoots one but cannot kill the others so the men perform an old Indian trick and leave their hats as fodder while they sneak away. A bolt of lightning separates Haller's company from its pursuers and they make it to Jose Antonio's house, another old smuggler friend of Raoul's. There they meet a priest who betrays them after their supper. Haller, Raoul, Chane and Clayley are again captured, but Lincoln escapes. Their captors are the Jarochos, soldiers of the infamous Jarauta, a robber-priest. Padre Jarauta introduces himself and attacks Raoul. Haller springs to his defense but fails. Because of Haller's vivacity, Jarauta decides to postpone the Americans' imminent death and charges them to a young Jarocho named Lopez. Lopez and a band of Jarochos led by Jarauta deliver Haller and his men to a large cliff, where they hang Haller by his ankles. Lopez falls and dies over the edge as Lincoln pulls Haller back up. Haller rejoices at seeing Little Jack and several more men at his rescue. The men ride towards El Telegrafo, the Mexican headquarters and hear the battle begin. Before they even reach the fort, the American flag is flying; the battle is won.

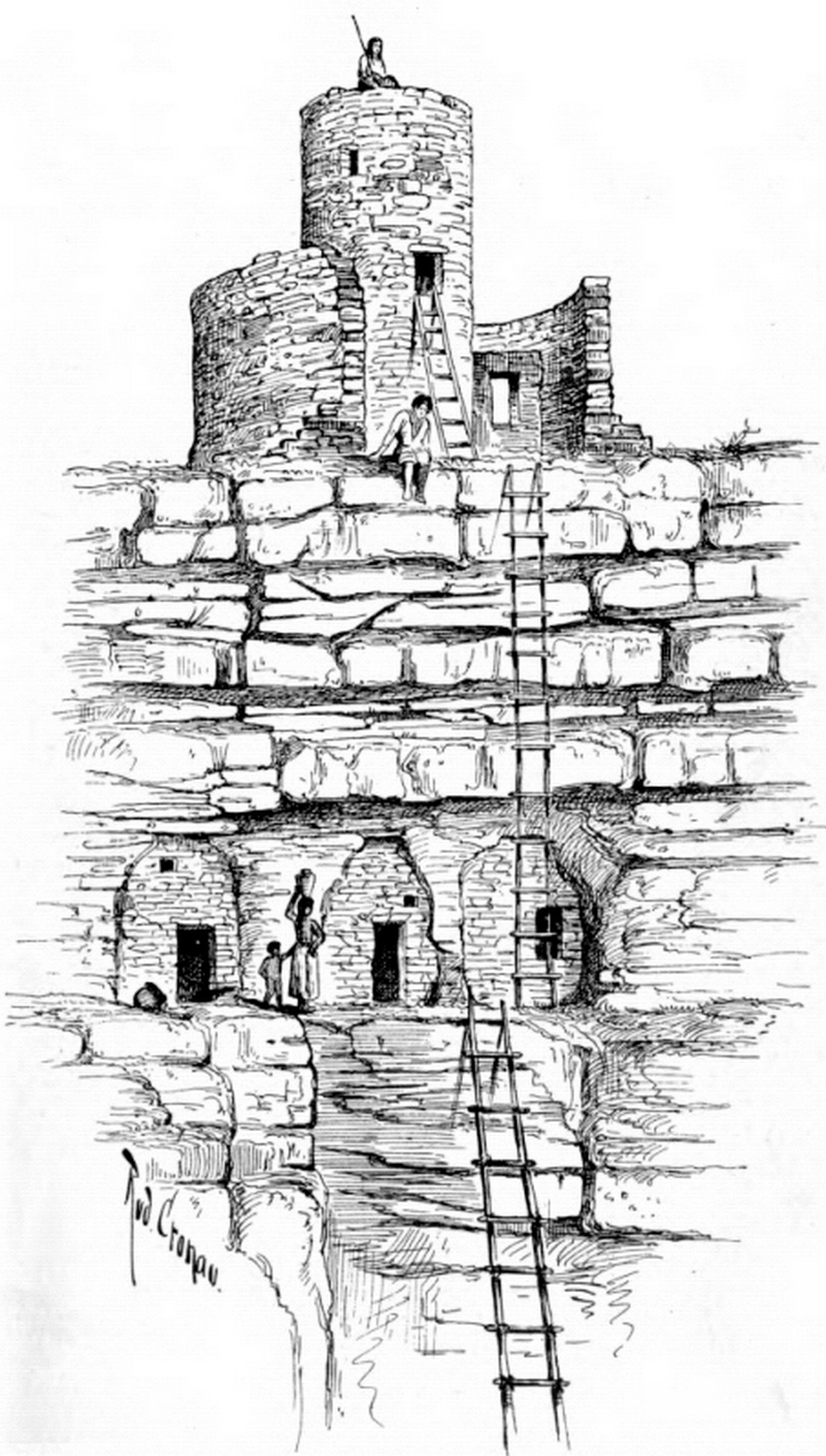

The Rangers then endeavor to set up an ambuscade for the fleeing Mexicans, which they ultimately take prisoner. They then return to the war-torn city. In the city, a fellow officer named Ransom challenges Haller to a duel. Before the duel begins, a band of Mexicans attack the party. At the head of the attack is Dubrosc. The following firefight is frenzy: Haller is covered in blood from a blow struck by an attacking Mexican and he fires a bullet. The bullet hits Dubrosc, who lies dead next to his horse. Among his personal effects, soldiers find a note saying he was a spy for General Santa Anna. He was sent to join the American army at New Orleans and to desert as soon as they reached Mexico. If he became captain of the Rifle Rangers, he would have surely given them up at La Virgen. After the battle, Ransom apologizes for the duel and the men befriend each other.

Haller and his men, fully recovered, relax after the battle, when Narcisso appears with an invitation to dinner. Haller agrees and seeks out Major Blossom so they can prepare for the ride. They have dinner with Don Cosme and his family several more times, until the war forces the men to leave Vera Cruz. They fight several more battles, about which Reid includes very little explanation, and Cpt. Haller returns to New Orleans in 1848. As he walks along the Levee with his wife, he sees Raoul and Bob Lincoln. They are headed to trap bears in the Rocky Mountains. Haller trades gifts with the men. Raoul receives Haller's rings, and Bob Lincoln receives Major Blossom's powerful Dutch rifle, with which he killed many Mexicans. Haller receives a letter from Clayley which implores him to return to Mexico, saying everyone there misses him, Guadalupe most of all. The last line of the story is "Reader, do you want me to come back?"

== Character list ==
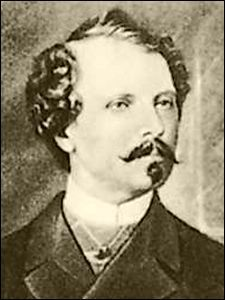
Thomas Mayne Reid (1883)

- Captain Jack Haller - (Protagonist) leads the Rifle Rangers
- Bob Lincoln - Trapper, Haller's old friend
- Major Blossom - Cowardly ally with a powerful Dutch rifle
- Chane - Irish Rifle Ranger
- Clayley - American Rifle Ranger who falls in love with Luz
- Raoul - French smuggler and ally to the Rangers
- Little Jack - Short Rifle Ranger with a small horse named 'Twidget'
- Don Cosme - Spanish-born rancher with two daughters
- Dubrosc - (Antagonist) Spy for Santa Anna

== Literary and historical background ==
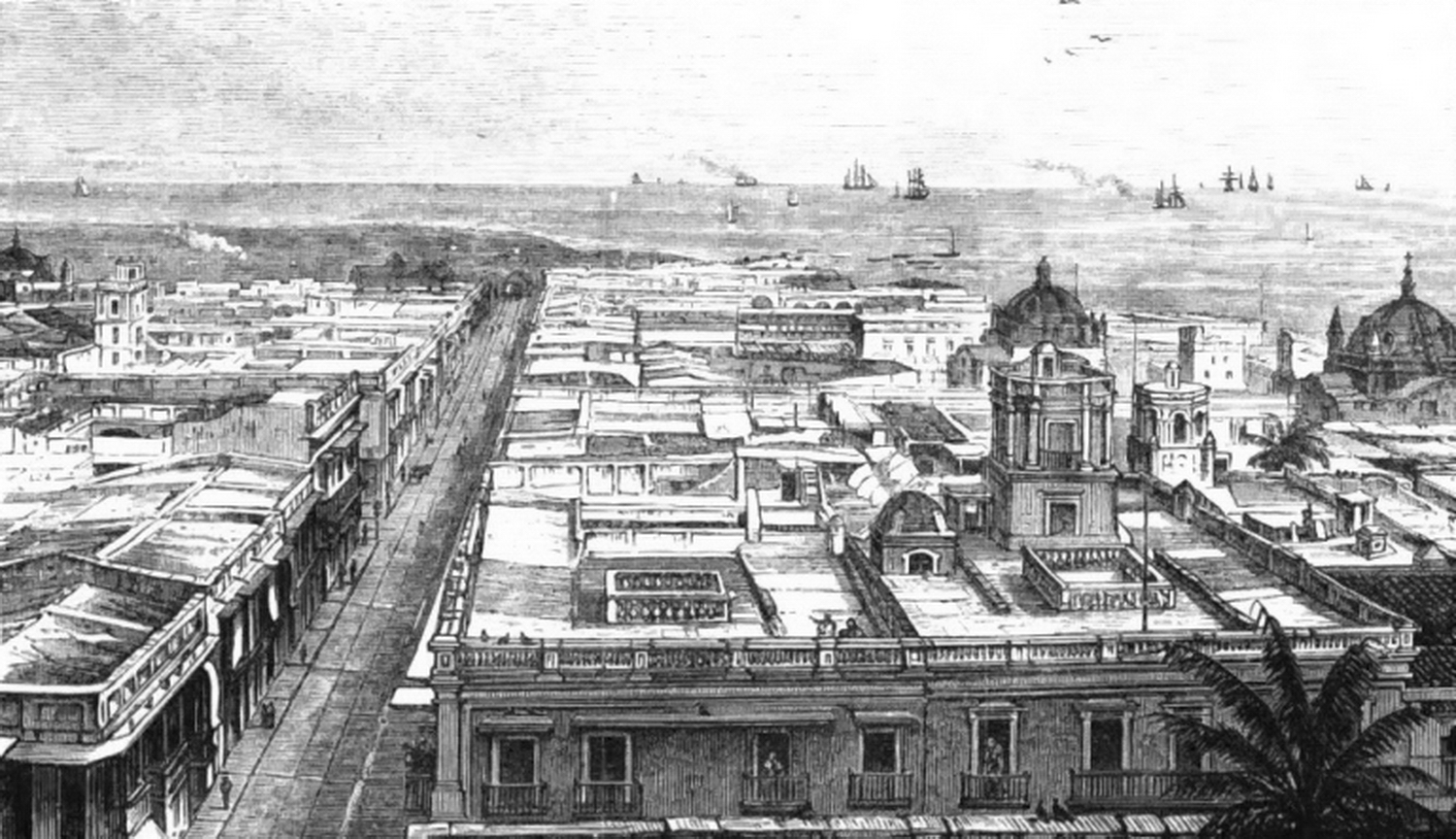
An 1875 illustration of the city of Vera Cruz

Reid joined the US Army in 1846 and was stationed on Lobos Island in Mexico in 1847. Under the direction of Major General Winfield Scott Reid took part in the invasion of Vera Cruz on March 9. Reid's in-depth descriptions of Lobos early in the novel are reflective of his time in Mexico. The poignancy with which he describes the natural setting and the shifts in climate suggest he relayed similar information back to the United States while simultaneously working as a wartime correspondent for the New York newspaper, Spirit of the Times.

An article from the Spirit from May 1850 states, "While campaigning in the south of [Mexico] his mind was forcibly impressed with its wild and picturesque scenery, as well as by a thousand interesting peculiarities in the character, costumes, and customs of its inhabitants." Reid's participation in the siege of Vera Cruz also explains the profound recollection Cpt. Haller has as the city is being destroyed in the novel. Reid resigned his position in 1848 after suffering a wound at the Battle of Chapultapec, which explains Cpt. Haller's return to New Orleans at the end of the war.

== Genre ==
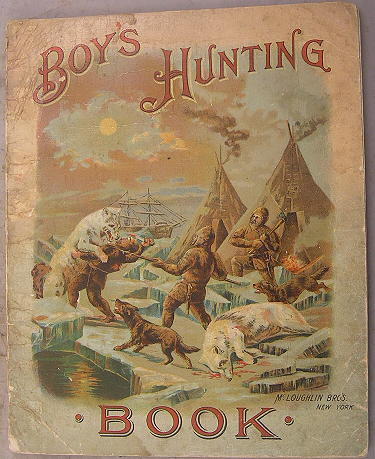
Boy's adventure fiction

The Rifle Rangers belongs to a common genre in 19th century Britain: the Imperial Adventure novel. Haller exemplifies the hero, taking up arms when his country needs him most and protecting civilized sovereignty. The characterization only extends far enough to explain Cpt. Haller and the gang's bravery, but fails to develop any other emotions, suggesting that emotion has no place on the battlefield. Reid's characters adhere to the genre strictly, following orders from their commanders, sacrificing their safety for the good of the battalion, saving damsels in distress, and glorifying nationalistic morals. It is this wholehearted devotion to a mission that characterizes the adventure genre as well as Reid's respective characters. The main component of the novel that strays from genre is the complete lack of Imperial values. There is no domination of a "lower" race, no "savages" to convert and no colony to establish. The soldiers are simply there to protect their country and kill only those they are ordered to kill.

== Style ==
Reid's militaristic, straightforward style establishes an optimistic tone within the novel. Even at the bleakest moments, Reid exemplifies Haller's guile and the reliability of the Ranger company. He does not present any situation in which hopelessness fails to resolve itself. The plot is clearly driven by the consequences of each adventure and Haller's search for his foil, Dubrosc. A component Reid interweaves seamlessly into his wartime narrative is the depiction of natural imagery, to which he devotes the bulk of his text. Its profound effect on Cpt. Haller and the company lead to later passages wherein the nature of war as well as the nature of love can be described through natural scenery.

Littered throughout the text are many lines in Spanish, with the appropriate English translation, written in the dialect of the native Mexican people. The intermittent Spanish represents Reid's attention to detail when developing tone. Often a character misreads the situation because of his ignorance, which in turn changes the outcome of events for the entire company. Reid also clearly delineates the social divide between classes, denoting the possessions, abode, appearance and demeanor for each class. He establishes the divide early in the novel so that inferences can be drawn when Cpt. Haller interacts with various members of these classes.

When Haller describes the low land area between the Gulf and the foothills, a part of the Tierra Caliente, we see Reid's need for that aforementioned delineation. He talks about the locals of African descent, as well as a race that is a cross of Africans and the ancient inhabitants of the country, called Zamboes, who live a "half-indolent, half-savage life as small cultivators, cattlle-herds fishermen or hunters." Haller describes their lifestyle as vaguely savage:

"They wear rude garments of white cotton cloth; but they are half-naked, and their skins are dark, almost black. Their hair is wooly and frizzled. They are not Indians, they are not negroes, they are 'zamboes'-a mixture of both. They are coarse-featured and coarsely clad. You would find it difficult, at a little distance, to distinguish their sex, did you not know that those who swing in the hammoks and recline indolently upon the palm-mats are the men, and those who move about and do the work are the females. One of the former occasionally stimulates the activity of the latter by the stroke of a cuarto. (mule-whip)" Going deeper into the country through the forest, Haller talk about the different types of people that live there. They find a rancho owned by a vaquero. The working ranchero is a Mestizo, a half-breed between Indian and Mexican.

Similarly, as Haller's adventure progresses, he discusses the vaqueros, the ranch owners, the rancheros, who work the ranch and are often Mestizos, (link) and the divide between the rich cotton planters, who live in haciendas and the lowest class, the Indios mansos, the recently freed Indian slaves who work as laborers in the fields of the rich. "They are the peons, the labourers, the serfs of the land-the descendants of the conquered sons of Anahuac." After describing the people of the Tierra Caliente, he notes on the homogeneity across all Spanish American races.

== Themes ==
=== Nature ===
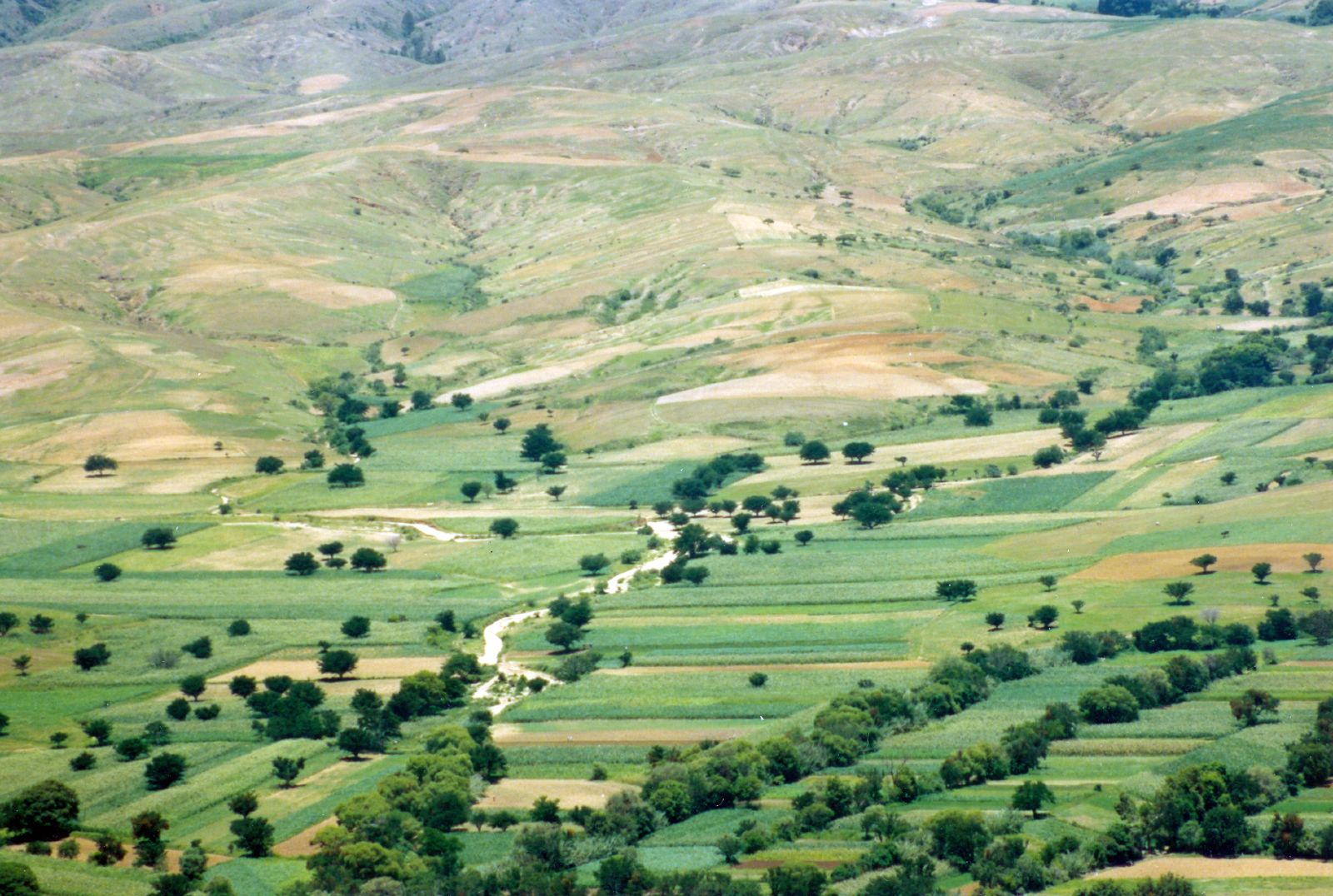
Tierra Caliente

Reid's primary theme in The Rifle Rangers is nature. Reid devotes much of the early text in the novel to describing the beauty of his protagonist's Mexican setting. He delineates the natural differences between the Tierras, even though the book only takes place in the Tierra Caliente. The in-depth descriptions both catalog the Rangers’ quest through the interior of Mexico as well as their impending battles. In the scenes where the Rangers meet locals and traverse pleasant landscapes, Cpt. Haller describes the colors and sounds and scents of nature. Before battles or times of turmoil, Haller notes only the dark tones and bleakness inherent in his surroundings.

Haller's description of setting establishes the tone of the novel. Reid's depiction of nature is cyclical. For as long as it appears dreary, it appears equally as stunning and brilliant. The unpredictability of nature thus reflects the unpredictability of human nature, as can be seen in the Rangers’ constant movements and skirmishes. "Mayne [Reid's] primary obsession is with the pretty things around his characters; their interactions and lives seem unimportant in comparison, but he still does a brilliant job relaying their exploits."

=== Bravery ===
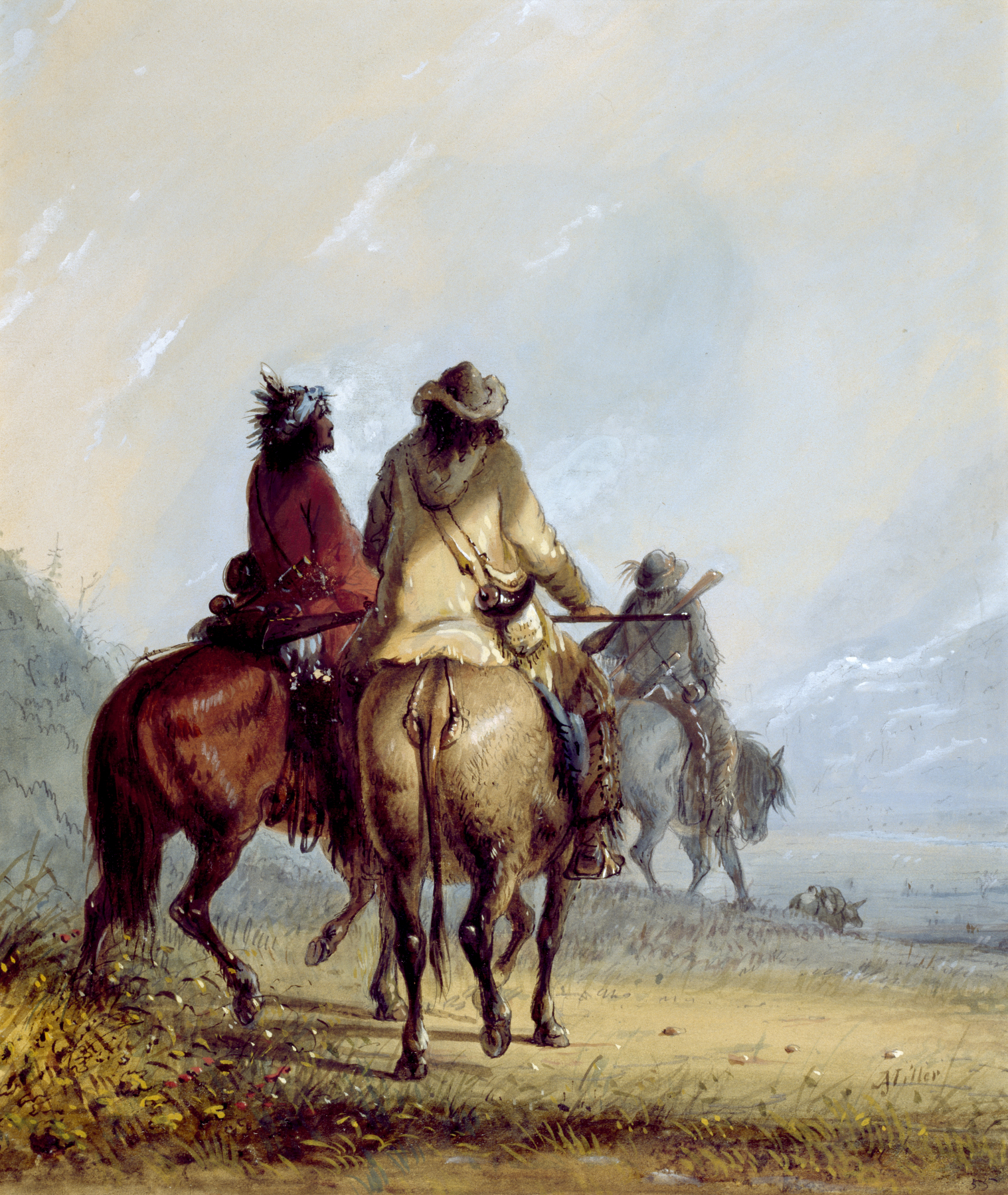
Brave trappers

Another major theme in The Rifle Rangers is the concept of masculine bravery. Reid personifies bravery through Cpt. Haller, who somehow escapes every precarious, life-threatening situation with grace, yet the true personification of bravery is Bob Lincoln. In every capture, Lincoln escapes and ultimately saves the rest of the company. In every battle, he kills the most enemies and goes through the novel unscathed, suggesting bravery is the most useful tool on the battlefield. His strength and determination manifest in his unbounded bravery. While he appears to be extremely skilled, dexterous and indestructible, he is also a primarily emotionless character. Clearly he is driven to protect his fellow soldiers with his utmost bravery and strength, but Reid avoids describing Lincoln's emotions. Reid sacrifices deeper characterization for the sake of perpetuating this theme. "Mayne [Reid's] primary obsession is with the pretty things around his characters; their interactions and lives seem unimportant."

=== The frontier ===
The novel takes place on a mostly uninhabited open frontier. Unlike other novels in the genre, which stress conquering this open land, Reid's narrative depicts an atypical Imperial standpoint in which the frontier is merely an area upon which war is waged. There is no colonial drive behind the Rifle Rangers’ mission, simply a nationalistic urge to protect their country. Along with that urge, as can be seen in Haller's monologues about nature, is the influence the setting has on Reid's protagonist. Too rapt is he in his surroundings to focus on conquering. Reid proves that nature need not be dominated, but appreciated instead.

== Critical reception ==
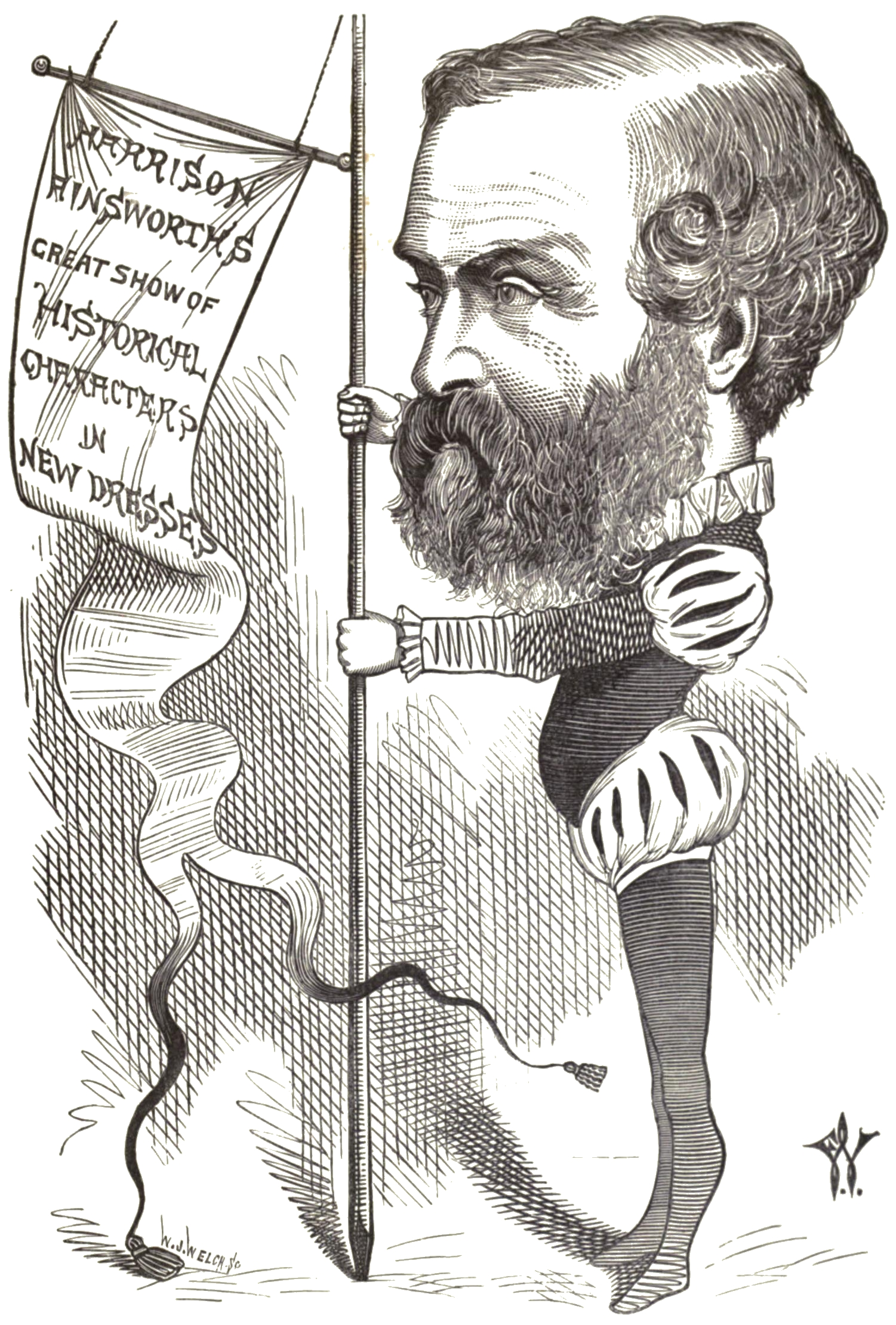
A caricature of contemporary critic, William Harrison Ainsworth

The Rifle Rangers was originally published in May 1850, completed in two volumes and sold for fifty cents a piece. A review of new publications in the Spirit of the Times from January 1852 explains The Rifle Rangers "was well-received, and met with a quick and extensive sale." Reid's positive reputation preceded the novel's publication and improved its sales. "We know the Captain well-he is a brave, gallant soldier, a good writer, and a warm friend. The work will be found very interesting." Not all critics shared the same perspective. "If [Reid] had given us a simple and faithful narrative of what he saw there, we should have thanked him for his pains: but the interest of the book is greatly impaired by the introduction of fictitious names and incidents, and by the highly exaggerated tone of the whole work." Besides the fictive adventures Reid includes in the book, critics also commented on the improbability of Reid's actual experiences in Mexico. "The adventures related are so numerous and so startling, that truth must indeed be a great deal stranger than fiction if we are to yield implicit faith to all that these volumes contain." Nonetheless, even the negative reviews still praise Reid's depiction of natural imagery. "This apparent spirit of exaggeration is to be regretted, as the work abounds in vigorous passages displaying great descriptive power."
