= Roy Wilson (lawyer) =

Sir Roy Mickel Wilson, QC (1903 – 12 April 1982) was a British lawyer. He was President of the Industrial Court from 1961 to 1971 and President of the Industrial Arbitration Board from 1971 to 1976.

== Arms ==
Coat of arms of Roy Wilson
Notes Displayed on a painted panel at Gray's Inn. Crest A demi wolf Sable holding in the dexter paw a scroll Argent. Escutcheon Argent on a chevron between in chief two mullets Gules and in base a lozenge Sable a cross formy fitchy Argent. Motto Semper Vigilans
