= Seymour Gonne Vesey-FitzGerald =

Seymour Gonne Vesey-FitzGerald, QC (30 May 1884 – 28 September 1954) was a British colonial civil servant, barrister, and legal academic.

== Biography ==
Vesey-FitzGerald was born in 1884, the son of Percy Seymour Vesey FitzGerald, CSI, a senior member of the Indian Civil Service, and the grandson of Sir Seymour Vesey-FitzGerald, Governor of Bombay. After attending Charterhouse School and Keble College, Oxford, he joined the ICS in 1907, serving in the Central Provinces as a registrar, district judge and eventually legal secretary to the Legislative Council.

He returned to England in 1923 and taught Oriental laws in Oxford and London throughout the 1920s and early 1930s. In 1927, he became Lecturer in Hindu and Mohamedan Laws at the Inns of Court. In 1935, he became Supervisor of the Indian Civil Service Probationers at the University of London, and two years later became Reader in Indian Law. Between 1946 and 1951, he was then Professor of Oriental Laws at the School of Oriental and African Studies and was the first head of the department from 1948, and Dean of the University of London's Faculty of Law between 1948 and 1951, when he retired. He died three years later.
