= John Latey (journalist) =

British journalist and writer

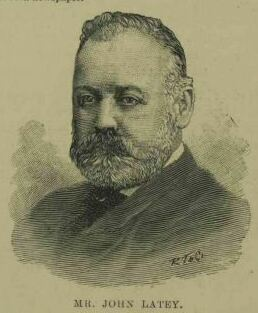
John Latey

John Latey (30 October 1842 – 26 September 1902) was a British journalist and writer.

== Life ==
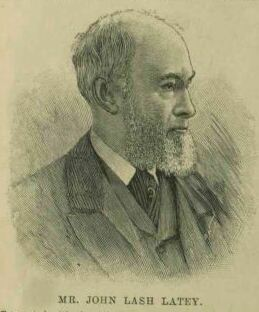
His father John Lash Latey

Latey was a son of John Lash Latey (1808–1891), editor of the Illustrated London News from 1858 to 1890. He wrote parliamentary sketches for the ILN under the pseudonym 'The Silent Member'. He also wrote novels and translated Dumas and Paul Féval.

Latey joined the Penny Illustrated Paper when it was started by William Ingram in 1861, and was the paper's art and literary editor until 1901. He co-edited the Boys Illustrated Newspaper with Captain Mayne Reid from 1881 to 1882, and was editor of The Sketch from 1899 until his death.

In August 1872 he married Constance Lachenal. They had three sons and one daughter, Josephine, who in 1903 married the cartoonist and illustrator W. Heath Robinson. His son William Latey was a Divorce Commissioner.

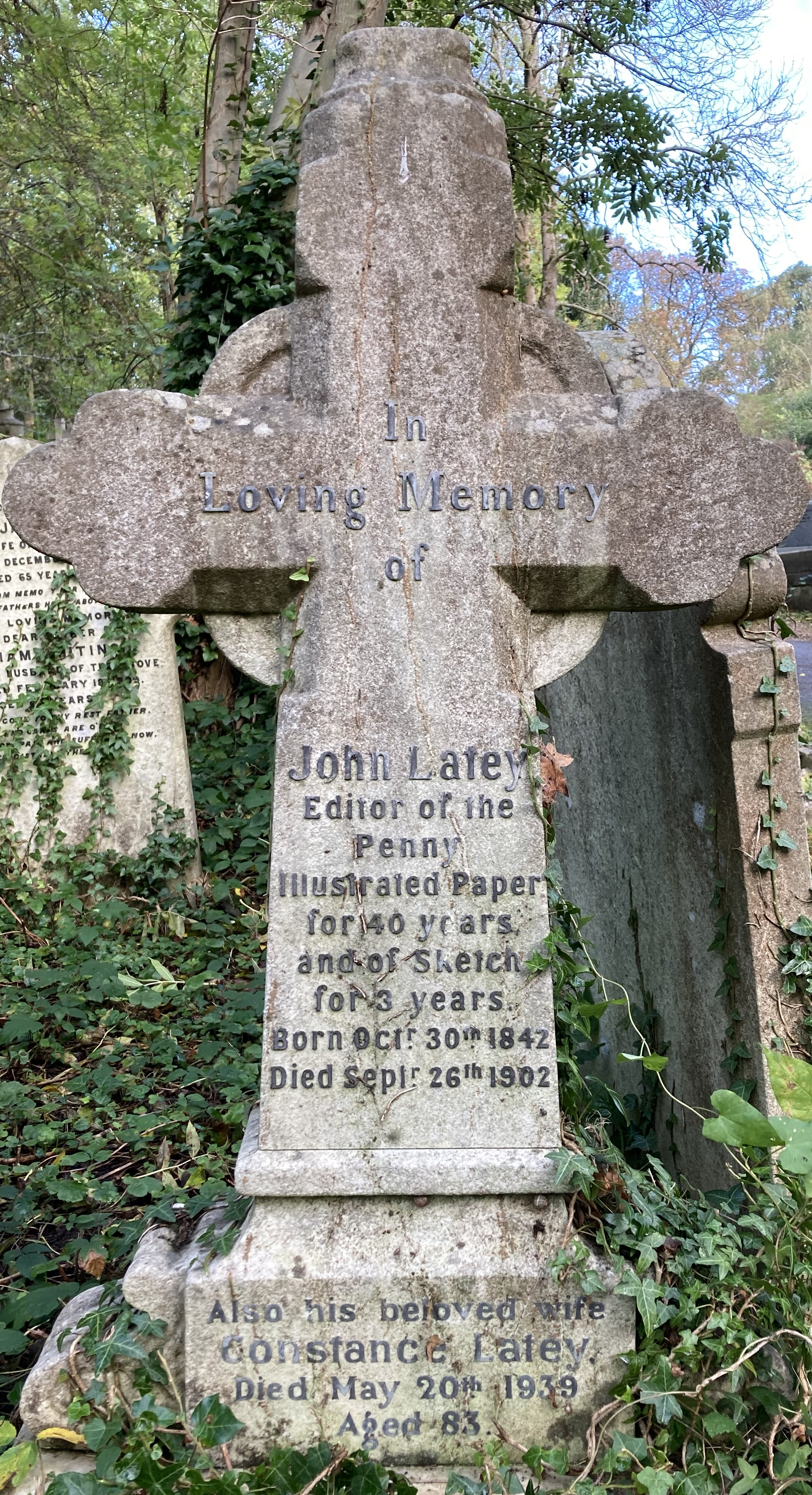
Grave of John Latey in Highgate Cemetery

He died on 26 September 1902 and was buried on the eastern side of Highgate Cemetery.

== Works ==
- The Rose of Hastings
- Life of General Gordon
- Mohicans of Paris (transl. of Dumas), 1875.
- The River of Life: a London story, 1886
- The Three Red Knights (transl. of Paul Féval's Le Fils du diable), 1882
