= Carrick, Cumnock and Doon Valley (UK Parliament constituency) =

UK Parliament constituency (1983–2005)

- Former county constituency for the House of Commons
- Boundary of Carrick, Cumnock and Doon Valley in Scotland for the 1997 general election
- Subdivision: East Ayrshire & South Ayrshire
- Major settlements: Cumnock, Dalmellington, Maybole, Patna, etc…

1983–2005
- Seats: One
- Created from: Ayr and South Ayrshire
- Replaced by: Ayr, Carrick & Cumnock; Central Ayrshire; Kilmarnock & Loudoun

Carrick, Cumnock and Doon Valley was a county constituency represented in the House of Commons of the Parliament of the United Kingdom from 1983 until 2005. Half of the constituency was incorporated into the new Ayr, Carrick and Cumnock constituency, with the remainder incorporated into the new Central Ayrshire constituency and the expanded Kilmarnock and Loudoun constituency.

== Boundaries ==
1983–1997: Cumnock and Doon Valley District, and the Kyle and Carrick District electoral divisions of Annbank Mossblown and St Quivox, Carrick, and Coylton and Kincaidston.

1997–2005: Cumnock and Doon Valley District, and the Kyle and Carrick District electoral divisions of Ayr South, Coylton and Annbank, and Carrick.

== History ==
The Carrick, Cumnock and Doon Valley constituency was created as part of the Third Periodical Review of Parliamentary constituencies in 1983. It was a direct successor to the former South Ayrshire constituency which covered the modern electoral wards of Doon Valley, Cumnock & New Cumnock, Ballochmyle, Girvan & South Carrick and Maybole, North Carrick & Coylton alongside Annbank which forms part of the Kyle electoral ward. The new constituency stretched across the former South Ayrshire constituency whilst also incorporating the council estate of Kincaidston in Ayr and a large, unpopulated section of Prestwick, east of Prestwick airport.

Significant boundary change took place as part of the Fourth Periodical Review in time for the 1997 general election. Large swathes of the Ayr constituency were transferred to the Carrick, Cumnock and Doon Valley constituency, altering the demographic of both seats. The Conservative-voting suburbs of Alloway, Doonfoot, Castlehill, Masonhill and Holmston were incorporated into Carrick, Cumnock and Doon Valley alongside the council estates of south Belmont and part of Forehill. The east section of Prestwick which was previously contained within Carrick, Cumnock and Doon Valley was transferred back to Ayr.

For the 2005 general election the Carrick, Cumnock and Doon Valley constituency was divided into three constituencies, with Mossblown, Annbank and St. Quivox forming part of the Central Ayrshire constituency alongside Irvine, Kyle, Prestwick, Troon and part of Ayr (Heathfield) and Kilwinning. The Ballochmyle electoral ward was added to Kilmarnock and Loudoun whilst the remainder of the constituency was joined to the Labour-Conservative marginal town of Ayr to form the Ayr, Carrick and Cumnock seat. These boundaries currently remain in place today.

== Members of Parliament ==
As South Ayrshire:

Year	Member	Whip
1868	constituency created, see Ayrshire	
1868	Sir David Wedderburn	Liberal
1874	Claud Alexander	Conservative
1885	Eugene Wason	Liberal
1886	Greville Richard Vernon	Liberal Unionist
1892	Eugene Wason	Liberal
1895	Sir William Arrol	Liberal Unionist
1906	Sir William Beale	Liberal
1918	James Brown	Labour
1931	James Orr MacAndrew	Unionist
1935	James Brown	Labour
1939	Alexander Sloan	Labour
1946	Emrys Hughes	Labour
1970	Jim Sillars	Labour
1976	Jim Sillars	Scottish Labour
1979	George Foulkes	Labour
1983	constituency abolished	

As Carrick, Cumnock and Doon Valley:

Election	Member	Party
1983	constituency created, see South Ayrshire	
1983	George Foulkes	Labour Co-operative
1987	George Foulkes	Labour Co-operative
1992	George Foulkes	Labour Co-operative
1992	George Foulkes	Labour Co-operative
2001	George Foulkes	Labour Co-operative
2005	constituency abolished, see Ayr, Carrick and Cumnock, Central Ayrshire and Kilmarnock and Loudoun	

== Elections ==
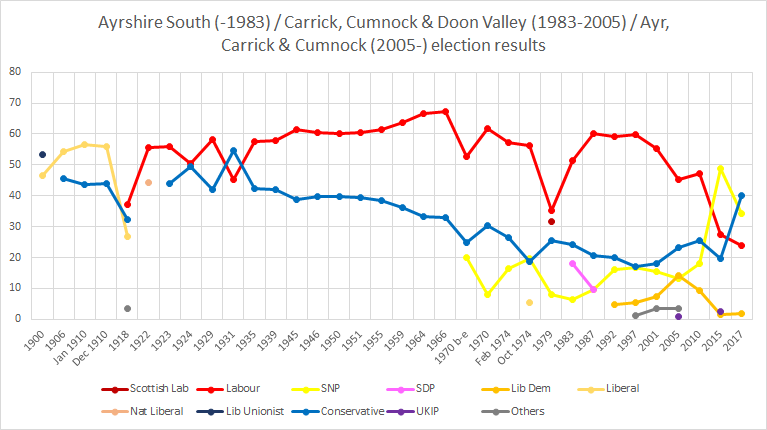
South Ayrshire electoral history

=== Elections of the 1980s ===
General election 1983: Carrick, Cumnock and Doon Valley
Party	Candidate	Votes	%	±%
Labour Co-op	George Foulkes	21,394	51.5	+14.8
Conservative	James McInnes	10,024	24.1	−2.1
SDP	Robert Logan	7,421	17.9	
SNP	Ron Wyllie	2,694	6.5	−1.5
Majority		11,370	27.4	+16.9
Turnout		41,533	74.3	
Labour Co-op win (new seat)				

General election 1987: Carrick, Cumnock and Doon Valley
Party	Candidate	Votes	%	±%
Labour Co-op	George Foulkes	25,669	60.1	+8.6
Conservative	Struan Stevenson	8,867	20.7	−3.4
SDP	Maryum Ali	4,106	9.6	−8.3
SNP	Charles Calman	4,094	9.6	+3.1
Majority		16,802	39.4	+12.0
Turnout		42,736	75.8	+1.5
Labour Co-op hold		Swing	+6.0	

=== Elections of the 1990s ===
General election 1992: Carrick, Cumnock and Doon Valley
Party	Candidate	Votes	%	±%
Labour Co-op	George Foulkes	25,142	59.1	−1.0
Conservative	James A.D. Boswell	8,516	20.0	−0.7
SNP	Charles E. Douglas	6,910	16.2	+6.6
Liberal Democrats	Mary C. Paris	2,005	4.7	−4.9
Majority		16,626	39.1	−0.3
Turnout		42,573	76.9	+1.1
Labour Co-op hold		Swing	−0.2	

General election 1997: Carrick, Cumnock and Doon Valley
Party	Candidate	Votes	%	±%
Labour Co-op	George Foulkes	29,398	59.8	+5.8
Conservative	Alistair J. Marshall	8,336	17.0	−8.7
SNP	Christine Hutchison	8,190	16.7	+1.6
Liberal Democrats	Derek G. Young	2,613	5.3	+0.1
Referendum	John K. Higgins	634	1.3	New
Majority		21,062	42.8	+3.7
Turnout		49,171	75.0	−1.9
Labour Co-op hold		Swing		

=== Elections of the 2000s ===
General election 2001: Carrick, Cumnock and Doon Valley
Party	Candidate	Votes	%	±%
Labour Co-op	George Foulkes	22,174	55.3	−4.5
Conservative	Gordon Millar	7,318	18.2	+1.2
SNP	Tom Wilson	6,258	15.6	−1.1
Liberal Democrats	Rebecca Rodger	2,932	7.3	+2.0
Scottish Socialist	Amanda McFarlane	1,058	2.6	New
Socialist Labour	James McDaid	367	0.9	New
Majority		14,856	37.1	−5.7
Turnout		40,107	61.8	−13.2
Labour Co-op hold		Swing		
