= Douglas Alexander (disambiguation) =

Douglas Alexander (born 1967) is a British politician.

Douglas Alexander may also refer to:

- Sir Douglas Alexander, 1st Baronet (1864–1949)
- Sir Douglas Hamilton Alexander, 2nd Baronet (1900–1983) of the Alexander baronets
- Sir Douglas Alexander, 3rd Baronet (born 1936) of the Alexander baronets
- Douglas Gillespie Alexander (born 1962) of the Alexander baronets
