= Donald Sloan =

Donald Sloan may refer to:

- Donald Sloan (basketball) (born 1988), American basketball player
- Donald Sloan (rugby union) (1926–2008), Scottish rugby union player
- Don Sloan (1883–1917), footballer
