= Carrick, Cumnock and Doon Valley =

Carrick, Cumnock and Doon Valley, may refer to:

- Carrick, Cumnock and Doon Valley (Scottish Parliament constituency)
- Carrick, Cumnock and Doon Valley (UK Parliament constituency)
