= 1899 Clackmannanshire and Kinross-shire by-election =

UK parliamentary by-election

The 1899 Clackmannanshire and Kinross-shire by-election was a parliamentary by-election held for the British House of Commons constituency of Clackmannanshire and Kinross-shire on 20 December 1899. The seat had become vacant when the sitting Liberal Member of Parliament John Balfour resigned having been appointed a judge.

The Liberal candidate, Eugene Wason, the former MP for South Ayrshire won the seat in a straight fight with his Conservative opponent George Younger.

== Result ==
Clackmannanshire and Kinross-shire by-election, 1899
Party	Candidate	Votes	%	±%
Liberal	Eugene Wason	3,489	54.0	−0.8
Conservative	George Younger	2,973	46.0	+0.8
Majority		516	8.0	−1.6
Turnout		6,462	83.7	+8.0
Liberal hold		Swing	-0.8	

== See also ==
- List of United Kingdom by-elections (1885–1900)
