= Hagart-Alexander baronets =

Baronetcy in the Baronetage of the United Kingdom

Hagart-Alexander Baronetcy
- Blazon Quarterly: 1st & 4th: Per pale argent and sable a chevron between a writing pen fessways in chief, and a crescent in base, all counterchanged, a bordure per pale gules and or (Alexander of Ballochmyle) 2nd, per bend azure and argent in chief a star of sixteen points or and in base another star of as many points of the first, on a bend sable, a lion passant of the second between two crosses moline of the third (for Hagart of Bantaskine); 3rd: Gules two straight swords in saltire, points downards proper hilted and pommelled or between two fleurs-de-lys in chief and a base of the second and two mullets in the flanks argent (for McCaul)
- Creation date: 22 January 1886
- Created by: Queen Victoria
- Baronetage: Baronetage of the United Kingdom
- First holder: Claud Alexander
- Present holder: Sir Claud Hagart-Alexander, 4th Baronet
- Heir apparent: Claud Miles Hagart-Alexander
- Remainder to: Heirs male of the body lawfully begotten
- Status: Extant
- Former seat: Ballochmyle House
- Motto: Perseverantia vincit ("Perseverance conquers")

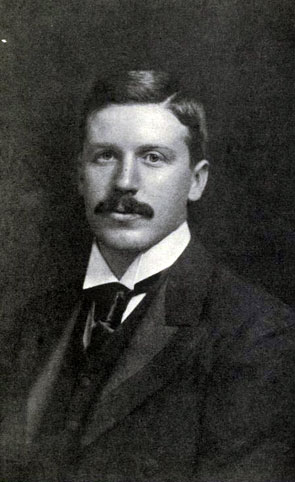
Sir Claud Alexander, 2nd Baronet (1867–1945)

The Alexander, later Hagart-Alexander baronetcy, of Ballochmyle, in the parish of Mauchline, in the County of Ayr, is a title in the Baronetage of the United Kingdom. It was created on 22 January 1886 for Major-General Claud Alexander, who served in the Crimean War and represented Ayrshire South in Parliament from 1874 to 1885.

The 3rd Baronet assumed the additional surname of Hagart, recognised by decree of the Lord Lyon in 1948.

== Alexander, later Hagart-Alexander baronets, of Ballochmyle (1886) ==
- Sir Claud Alexander, 1st Baronet (1831–1899)
- Sir Claud Alexander, 2nd Baronet (1867–1945)
- Sir Claud Hagart-Alexander, 3rd Baronet (1927–2006)
- Sir Claud Hagart-Alexander, 4th Baronet (born 1963)

The heir apparent to the baronetcy is the present holder's only son, Claud Miles (born 1998).

== See also ==
- Alexander baronets
- Cable-Alexander baronets
- Alexanders of Menstrie

Baronetage of the United Kingdom
Preceded by Morris baronets	Alexander baronets of Ballochmyle; 22 January 1886	Succeeded by Leighton baronets
