= Don Sloan =

Scottish footballer (1883–1917)

Donald Sloan
Personal information
- Full name: Donald Sloan
- Date of birth: 31 July 1883
- Place of birth: Rankinston, Scotland
- Date of death: 1 January 1917 (aged 33)
- Place of death: near Saint-Laurent-Blangy, France
- Position: Goalkeeper

Senior career*
Years	Team	Apps	(Gls)
–1903	Ayr		
1903–1906	Distillery		
1906–1908	Everton	6	(0)
1908–1909	Liverpool	6	(0)
1909–	Distillery		
–1912	Bathgate		
1912–1914	East Stirlingshire	43	(0)

International career
1905	Irish League XI	1	(0)

Managerial career
- Distillery (player-manager)
- * Club domestic league appearances and goals

Donald Sloan (31 July 1883 – 1 January 1917) was a Scottish professional footballer who played for in the Football League for Everton and Liverpool as a goalkeeper. He also played in the Scottish and Irish Leagues and made one appearance for the Irish League XI.

== Personal life ==
Sloan served as a private in the Black Watch during the First World War. He was killed when a German heavy mortar hit his dugout on 1 January 1917 near Saint-Laurent-Blangy, which caused it to collapse. He was buried in Faubourg-d'Amiens Cemetery, Arras. Sloan's elder brother Alexander Sloan later became the Labour MP for South Ayrshire. Four of his younger brothers also fought in the First World War, of whom three died.

== Career statistics ==
Appearances and goals by club, season and competition
Club	Season	League			National Cup		Total	
Club	Season	Division	Apps	Goals	Apps	Goals	Apps	Goals
Everton	1906–07	First Division	2	0	0	0	2	0
Everton	1907–08	First Division	4	0	0	0	4	0
Everton	Total		6	0	0	0	6	0
Liverpool	1908–09	First Division	6	0	0	0	6	0
East Stirlingshire	1912–13	Scottish First Division	21	0	7	0	28	0
East Stirlingshire	1913–14	Scottish First Division	22	0	9	0	31	0
East Stirlingshire	Total		43	0	16	0	59	0
Career total			55	0	16	0	71	0
