= 1939 South Ayrshire by-election =

UK parliamentary by-election

The 1939 South Ayrshire by-election was a parliamentary by-election held in the United Kingdom on 20 April 1939 to elect a Member of Parliament (MP) for the House of Commons constituency of South Ayrshire in Scotland.

== Previous MP ==
The by-election was triggered by the death of incumbent Labour MP James Brown. Brown had served as MP from the 1918 general election to his defeat in the Conservative and Unionist-backed National Government landslide in 1931, before being reelected in the 1935 general election and serving until his death. Brown had been a prominent backbencher, being appointed to the Privy Council in 1930 and thrice serving as Lord High Commissioner to the General Assembly of the Church of Scotland in 1924, 1930 and 1931. He was formerly a miner and one-time Secretary of both the Ayrshire Miners' Union and its Scotland-wide affiliate, the National Union of Scottish Mineworkers.

== Previous result ==
General election, 14 November 1935
Party	Candidate	Votes	%	±%
Labour	James Brown	18,190	57.61	
Unionist	James MacAndrew	13,396	42.39	
Majority		4,804	15.22	N/A
Turnout		31,576	78.03	
Labour gain from Unionist		Swing		

== Candidates ==
The Labour Party candidate was Alexander Sloan, known as Sandy Sloan. Like James Brown, he was a local miner and had been Secretary of both the Ayrshire Miners' Union and the National Union of Scottish Mineworkers.

== Result ==
The Labour Party held the seat.

By-election 1939: Ayrshire South
Party	Candidate	Votes	%	±%
Labour	Alexander Sloan	17,908	57.97	+0.36
Unionist	Catherine Gavin	12,986	42.03	−0.36
Majority		4,922	15.94	+0.72
Turnout		30,894		
Labour hold		Swing		

== Aftermath ==
In the 1945 general election, the result was:

General election, 5 July 1945
Party	Candidate	Votes	%	±%
Labour	Alexander Sloan	21,235	61.3	+3.7
Unionist	Robert Mathew	13,382	38.7	−3.7
Majority		7,853	22.6	+7.5
Turnout		34,617	75.2	−2.8
Labour hold		Swing		
