= Nan Hardie =

Scottish labour movement activist

Agnes Hardie
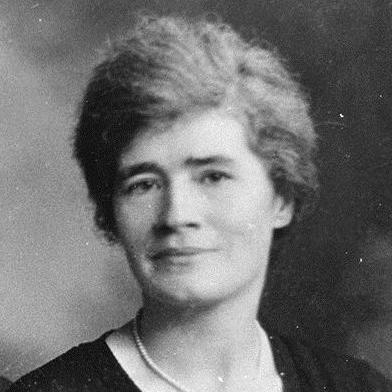
- Born: 5 October 1885; Cumnock
- Died: 27 June 1947 (aged 61); Mauchline
- Spouse: Emrys Hughes

Agnes "Nan" Paterson Hardie (5 October 1885 – 27 June 1947) was a Scottish labour movement activist.

== Life ==
Hardie was born in Cumnock in Ayrshire, Hardie was the daughter of Keir and Lilian Hardie. Hardie was then a prominent mining trade unionist, and he later became the first leader of the Labour Party. Keir believed that Nan would be his political heir, and spent a large amount of time discussing politics with her, and introduced her to other leading figures in the movement; notably, John Bruce Glasier, with whom she retained a long-term friendship.

Nan left school at the age of fourteen but, three years later, became seriously ill, suffering from pleurisy and appendicitis; although she recovered, she suffered with poor health for the remainder of her life. She accompanied her father on many speaking trips, including one to Nova Scotia in 1912, until 1915 when he became ill; Nan and her mother looked after him until he died, later in the year.

In 1924, Hardie married Emrys Hughes, a socialist journalist, and she spent much of the next decade assisting him in his journalistic and political career. In 1933, she herself was elected to Cumnock Town Council, on which she served as convenor of the Public Health Committee. In 1935, she succeeded her husband as provost, and the two together waged a long campaign for slum clearance and their replacement with council housing. This was massively successful, and by 1939, three-quarters of the town's population lived in council houses.

Hardie took a particular interest in children's activities, founding a park and lido in the town, and also promoted cycling. She was appointed as a magistrate, and during World War II chaired the Cumnock War Work Party; although, like her husband, she opposed the conflict, she was keen to assist in the welfare of those serving in the force and their dependents.

In 1946, Hughes became seriously ill, and Hardie tried to resign as provost. Instead, the council persuaded her to take a leave of absence, but the process of caring for him damaged her own health, and she died in June 1947.
