= Sir Frank Alexander, 1st Baronet =

British shipbroker and politician (1881 - 1959)

Sir Frank Alexander Bt
- Alexander as Lord Mayor
- Born: 17 June 1881; London, England
- Died: 18 July 1959 (aged 78)
- Education: Highgate School
- Occupations: Shipowner and shipbroker

Sir Frank Samuel Alexander, 1st Baronet (17 June 1881 – 18 July 1959) was a British shipowner and shipbroker. He was Lord Mayor of London from 1944 to 1945.

== Biography ==
Born in London, Alexander was educated at Highgate School from January 1892 to July 1898. He was later a Governor of the school from 1942 to 1950. During the First World War, he served in the Royal Artillery, reaching the rank of captain. Alexander was a partner in Capper, Alexander & Co. and a director of Alexander Shipping Co., Ltd. He was Chairman of Baltic Mercantile and Shipping Exchange from 1939 to 1946 and a board member of the Port of London Authority.

An Alderman of Aldgate Ward in the City of London, Alexander was Sheriff of the City of London from 1940 to 1941. He was Lord Mayor of London from 1944 to 1945.

Alexander was knighted in 1942 and created a Baronet, of Sundridge Park in the County of Kent, in 1945.
