= William Morison (1781–1851) =

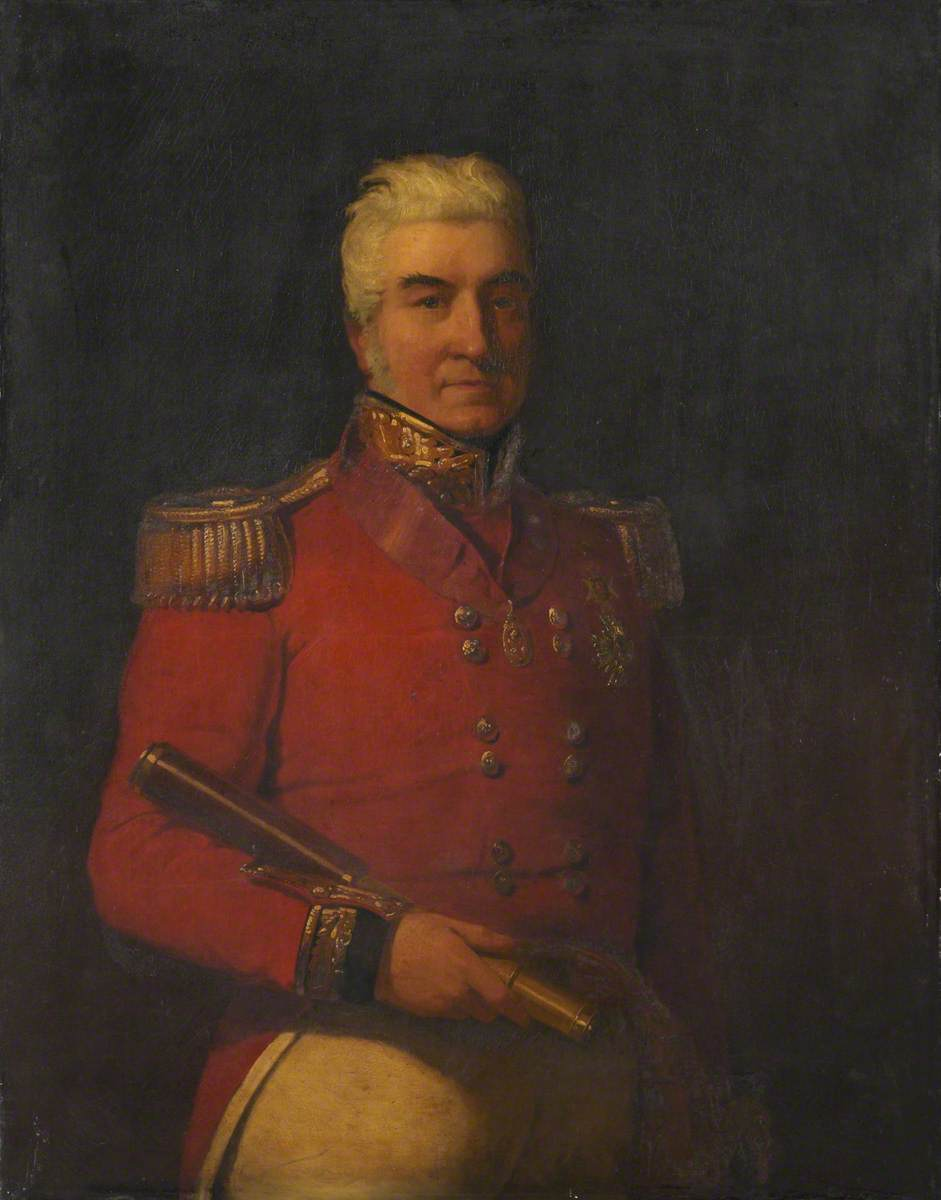
Portrait of Major-General Sir William Morison, c. 1845.

General Sir William Morison KCB FRS FRSE (1781 – 15 May 1851) was a Scottish Whig Party politician and professional soldier.

== Life ==
He was born in central Scotland in 1781.

Trained as an officer in the British Army he rose to the rank of General in the Madras Artillery. In 1826 he appears as a Major operating in Goa. He was also the Chief Commissioner of Mysore. Whilst in India he served as a Member of the Supreme Council of India. He retired this post in 1839 and was replaced by Major General William Casement.

He was elected at the by-election of February 1842 as the Member of Parliament (MP) for Clackmannanshire and Kinross-shire. He was returned unopposed in 1847.

He was created a Knight Commander of the Order of the Bath by Queen Victoria in 1848.

In 1841 he was elected a Fellow of the Royal Society of Edinburgh his proposer being John Robison and in 1842 was elected a Fellow of the Royal Society of London

He died in office on 15 May 1851.

== Artistic recognition ==
His portrait is held by the National Army Museum.

Parliament of the United Kingdom
Preceded by George Abercromby	Member of Parliament for Clackmannanshire and Kinross-shire; 1842 – 1851	Succeeded by James Johnstone
