= Frederick Gilbert Bourne =

American businessman (1851–1919)

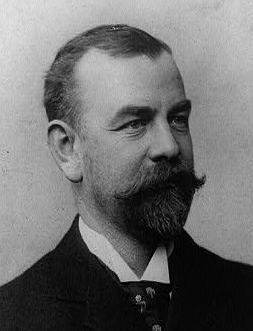

5th President of the Singer Manufacturing Company
- In office 1889–1905
- Preceded by: George Ross McKenzie
- Succeeded by: Douglas Alexander

Personal details
- Born: December 20, 1851 Boston, Massachusetts, U.S.
- Died: March 9, 1919 (aged 67) Oakdale, New York, U.S.
- Spouse: Emma Sparks Keeler
- Children: 12

Commodore Frederick Gilbert Bourne (December 20, 1851 – March 9, 1919) was an American businessman. He was the fifth president of the Singer Manufacturing Company, from 1889 to 1905. He made the business "perhaps the first modern multinational industrial enterprise of any nationality".

== Early life ==
Bourne was born on December 20, 1851, in Boston, Massachusetts. He was the son of the Rev. George Washington Bourne (1815–1872) and Harriet J. (née Gilbert) Bourne (1817–1907), who was from Portland, Maine. His older sister was Clara Bourne, who married John Loring Whitman.

His paternal grandparents were Benjamin Bourne and Mary (née Hatch) Bourne, herself the daughter of Joshua Hatch, a soldier during the American Revolutionary War who was killed near Crown Point after the evacuation of Fort Ticonderoga in 1777.

Bourne and his family moved to New York City by 1860, when Bourne was likely around nine years old. His family was poor, and as a result could not afford to send him to college later on in life.

Throughout his childhood, Bourne was fond of mechanical work, history, science, and adventure. He was an avid reader, and had a "veracious thirst for knowledge". By age 11, he was also a member of the choir at Holy Trinity Church.

Bourne was educated at public schools in New York before joining the work force at age fourteen.

== Career ==
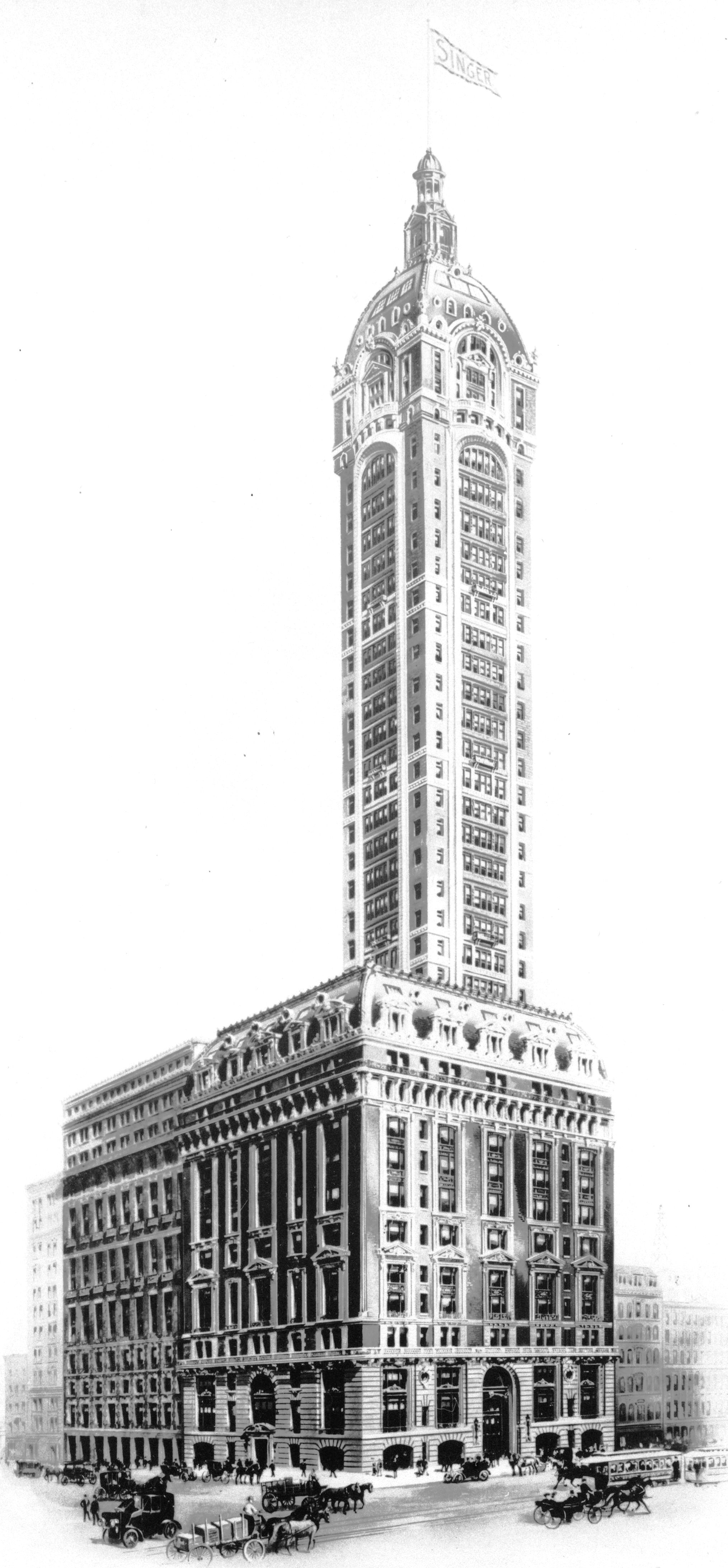
The Singer Building, commissioned by Bourne for the Singer Manufacturing Company and completed in 1908.

In order to support of his widowed mother and younger sisters, Bourne started his career in New York with the Atlantic Submarine Wrecking Company, later becoming a cashier and bookkeeper and the clerk of the Mercantile Library.

Bourne, who was interested in music, was a member of the Mendelssohn Glee Club, which is likely where he met Alfred Corning Clark, the son of Edward Cabot Clark, who along with Isaac Merritt Singer, was a co-founder of the Singer Company. Bourne and Clark developed a "close personal relationship" and in 1880, Clark recommended to his father that Bourne be invited to join his family's real estate company, which owned several parcels of valuable Manhattan real estate, and be brought on as construction manager of The Dakota, then being built on West 72nd Street along Central Park. Clark frequently traveled abroad, often to Norway to visit the singer Lorentz Severin Skougaard (with whom he had a relationship despite his marriage to Elizabeth Scriven), and in his place, Clark sent Bourne to Singer board meetings.

In 1882, following the elder Clark's death, Bourne became the manager of the late Clark's estate. In 1885, Bourne became Secretary of the company and in 1889, at the age of 38, Bourne became the fifth president of Singer. While president, Bourne also oversaw the construction of the company's headquarters, known as the Singer Building.

Bourne greatly expanded global production as well as international sales of the Singer sewing machine. Bourne was revolutionary to the sewing machine industry. He used the "installment plan" to make sewing machines a household item. Bourne is also remembered "among the most important innovators in building vertically integrated firms". In 1905, and after sixteen years as president, Bourne retired and was succeeded by Douglas Alexander, who served as president for the next forty-four years. Alexander was created a baronet in the 1921 Birthday Honours for his services to the welfare of industrial workers.

=== Residences ===
Bourne owned several homes and estates. He maintained an apartment at The Dakota in New York City; he owned a 2,000-acre (4 km^{2}) country estate named Indian Neck Hall in Oakdale on Long Island next to Idle Hour, the estate of William Kissam Vanderbilt; he owned a 375-acre farm near Montauk, New York, which he used as an undeveloped hunting preserve; an apartment on Jekyll Island, Georgia; and the 7-acre Dark Island in the Thousand Islands in the St. Lawrence River.

In 1902, Bourne hired architect Ernest Flagg to build him a small hunting lodge on the Dark Island property. The building was based on a book written by Sir Walter Scott in 1826 called Woodstock. This book describes an elegant castle with secret passageways, tunnels, and a dungeon. Today, the castle is known as Singer Castle.

== Personal life ==
On February 9, 1875, he was married to Emma Sparks Keeler (1855–1916), the daughter of James Rufus Keeler and Mary Louise (née Davidson) Keeler. Emma was a granddaughter of Commodore Davidson, one of the founders of the New York Yacht Club. Together, they were the parents of twelve children:

- Frederick Gilbert Bourne Jr (1876–1884).
- Arthur Keeler Bourne (1877–1967), who married Edith Hollins; their son: Arthur Keeler Bourne (1899–1974); divorced. Married Emily Miller, with whom he had three children.
- Louisa D. Bourne (1879–c. 1879), who died in infancy.
- May Miller Bourne (1881–1975), who married Ralph B. Strassburger, a Pennsylvania businessman and prominent thoroughbred racehorse owner and breeder who owned Haras des Monceaux Thoroughbred horse farm at Lisieux in Lower Normandy, France.
- Marion Bourne (1882–1969), who married Robert George Elbert.
- Alfred Severin Bourne (1883–1956), who married Hattie Louise Barnes.
- Helen Bourne (1884–1887), who died in infancy.
- Florence Bourne (1886–1969), who married Anson Wales Hard (1884–1935). They divorced in 1932 after having seven children.
- George Gault Bourne (1888–1964), who married Nancy Atterbury Potter, a granddaughter of Bishop Alonzo Potter.
- Marjorie Bourne (1890–1962), who married Alexander Dallas Thayer (1888-1968).
- Kenneth Bourne (1891–1898), who died in childhood.
- Howard Davidson Bourne (1893–1918), who died aged 25.

A sailing enthusiast, Bourne served as a Commodore of the New York Yacht Club. He was also a member of the famous Jekyll Island Club (aka The Millionaires Club) on Jekyll Island, Georgia. Bourne owned many boats that he frequently used in New York City and at his summer home in the Thousand Islands.

After several months of ill-health, Bourne died at Indian Neck Hall, his residence in Oakdale on Long Island, on March 9, 1919. He died one of the wealthiest men in America, leaving an estate valued at $25,000,000.
