= Clackmannanshire and Kinross-shire =

Parliamentary constituency in the United Kingdom, 1832–1918

- Former county constituency for the House of Commons
- Subdivisions of Scotland: Clackmannanshire, Kinross-shire

1832–1918
- Seats: One
- Created from: Clackmannanshire and Kinross-shire
- Replaced by: Clackmannan & Eastern Stirlingshire; Kinross & Western Perthshire

Clackmannanshire and Kinross-shire was a constituency of the House of Commons of the Parliament of the United Kingdom from 1832 to 1918.

From 1708 to 1832 Clackmannanshire and Kinross-shire had been paired as alternating constituencies: one of the constituencies elected a Member of Parliament (MP) to one parliament, the other to the next.

From 1832, the two were joined by the Representation of the People (Scotland) Act 1832 in a single constituency of Clackmannanshire and Kinross-shire. The constituency also included the parishes of Tulliallan, Culross and Muckhart in Perthshire, the Perthshire portions of the parishes of Logie and Fossaway, and the Stirlingshire part of the parish of Alva.

From 1918, Clackmannanshire was represented as part of Clackmannan and Eastern Stirlingshire, and Kinross-shire as part of Kinross and Western Perthshire.

== Members of Parliament ==
Election	Member	Party
1832	Sir Charles Adam	Whig
1841	George Abercromby	Whig
1842 by-election	Sir William Morison	Whig
1851 by-election	James Johnstone	Peelite
1857	Viscount Melgund	Whig
1859	Sir William Patrick Adam	Liberal
1880 by-election	John Balfour	Liberal
1899 by-election	Eugene Wason	Liberal
1916	Eugene Wason	Coalition Liberal
1918	constituency abolished	

== Election results ==
=== Elections in the 1830s ===
General election 1832: Clackmannan and Kinross Shires
Party	Candidate	Votes	%
Whig	Charles Adam	527	72.9
Tory	Robert Bruce	196	27.1
Majority		331	45.8
Turnout		723	82.3
Registered electors		879	
Whig win (new seat)			

General election 1835: Clackmannan and Kinross Shires
Party	Candidate	Votes	%	±%
Whig	Charles Adam	447	61.1	−11.8
Conservative	Robert Bruce	285	38.9	+11.8
Majority		162	22.2	−23.6
Turnout		732	73.9	−8.4
Registered electors		990		
Whig hold		Swing	−11.8	

Adam was appointed as a Lord Commissioner of the Admiralty, requiring a by-election.

By-election, 4 May 1835: Clackmannan and Kinross Shires
Party	Candidate	Votes	%
Whig	Charles Adam	Unopposed	
Whig hold			

General election 1837: Clackmannan and Kinross Shires
Party	Candidate	Votes	%
Whig	Charles Adam	Unopposed	
Registered electors		1,181	
Whig hold			

=== Elections in the 1840s ===
General election 1841: Clackmannan and Kinross Shires
Party	Candidate	Votes	%	±%
Whig	George Abercromby	Unopposed		
Registered electors		1,272		
Whig hold				

Abercromby resigned by accepting the office of Steward of the Chiltern Hundreds, causing a by-election.

By-election, 18 February 1842: Clackmannan and Kinross Shires
Party	Candidate	Votes	%	±%
Whig	William Morison	Unopposed		
Whig hold				

General election 1847: Clackmannan and Kinross Shires
Party	Candidate	Votes	%	±%
Whig	William Morison	Unopposed		
Registered electors		1,373		
Whig hold				

=== Elections in the 1850s ===
Morison's death caused a by-election.

By-election, 9 June 1851: Clackmannan and Kinross Shires
Party	Candidate	Votes	%	±%
Peelite	James Johnstone	328	55.5	New
Whig	William Patrick Adam	263	44.5	N/A
Majority		65	11.0	N/A
Turnout		591	42.7	N/A
Registered electors		1,385		
Peelite gain from Whig		Swing	N/A	

General election 1852: Clackmannan and Kinross Shires
Party	Candidate	Votes	%	±%
Peelite	James Johnstone	Unopposed		
Registered electors		1,658		
Peelite gain from Whig				

General election 1857: Clackmannan and Kinross Shires
Party	Candidate	Votes	%	±%
Whig	William Elliot-Murray-Kynynmound	Unopposed		
Registered electors		1,836		
Whig gain from Peelite				

General election 1859: Clackmannan and Kinross Shires
Party	Candidate	Votes	%	±%
Liberal	William Patrick Adam	Unopposed		
Registered electors		1,932		
Liberal hold				

=== Elections in the 1860s ===
Adam was appointed a Lord Commissioner of the Treasury, requiring a by-election.

By-election, 20 April 1865: Clackmannan and Kinross Shires
Party	Candidate	Votes	%	±%
Liberal	William Patrick Adam	Unopposed		
Registered electors		1,896		
Liberal hold				

General election 1865: Clackmannan and Kinross Shires
Party	Candidate	Votes	%	±%
Liberal	William Patrick Adam	Unopposed		
Registered electors		1,162		
Liberal hold				

General election 1868: Clackmannan and Kinross Shires
Party	Candidate	Votes	%	±%
Liberal	William Patrick Adam	Unopposed		
Registered electors		1,802		
Liberal hold				

Adam was appointed a Lord Commissioner of the Treasury, requiring a by-election.

By-election, 6 January 1869: Clackmannan and Kinross Shires
Party	Candidate	Votes	%	±%
Liberal	William Patrick Adam	Unopposed		
Liberal hold				

=== Elections in the 1870s ===
General election 1874: Clackmannan and Kinross Shires
Party	Candidate	Votes	%	±%
Liberal	William Patrick Adam	943	66.8	N/A
Conservative	James Richard Haig	468	33.2	New
Majority		475	33.6	N/A
Turnout		1,411	74.4	N/A
Registered electors		1,896		
Liberal hold		Swing	N/A	

=== Elections in the 1880s ===
General election 1880: Clackmannan and Kinross Shires
Party	Candidate	Votes	%	±%
Liberal	William Patrick Adam	1,150	71.5	+4.7
Conservative	James Richard Haig	458	28.5	−4.7
Majority		692	43.0	+9.4
Turnout		1,608	77.2	+2.8
Registered electors		2,084		
Liberal hold		Swing	+4.7	

Adam was appointed as First Commissioner of Works, requiring a by-election.

By-election, 14 May 1880: Clackmannan and Kinross Shires
Party	Candidate	Votes	%	±%
Liberal	William Patrick Adam	Unopposed		
Liberal hold				

Adam was appointed as Governor of Madras, causing a by-election.

By-election, 1 December 1880: Clackmannan and Kinross Shires
Party	Candidate	Votes	%	±%
Liberal	John Balfour	Unopposed		
Liberal hold				

General election 1885: Clackmannan and Kinross Shires
Party	Candidate	Votes	%	±%
Liberal	John Balfour	Unopposed		
Liberal hold				

Balfour was appointed Lord Advocate, requiring a by-election.

By-election, 13 February 1886: Clackmannan and Kinross Shires
Party	Candidate	Votes	%	±%
Liberal	John Balfour	Unopposed		
Liberal hold				

Balfour

General election 1886: Clackmannan and Kinross Shires
Party	Candidate	Votes	%	±%
Liberal	John Balfour	3,159	63.1	N/A
Liberal Unionist	Charles Congalton Bethune	1,844	36.9	N/A
Majority		1,315	26.2	N/A
Turnout		5,003	72.2	N/A
Registered electors		6,930		
Liberal hold		Swing	N/A	

=== Elections in the 1890s ===
General election 1892: Clackmannan and Kinross Shires
Party	Candidate	Votes	%	±%
Liberal	John Balfour	3,541	64.8	+1.7
Liberal Unionist	James Edward Tierney Aitchison	1,927	35.2	−1.7
Majority		1,614	29.6	+3.4
Turnout		5,468	72.6	+0.4
Registered electors		7,535		
Liberal hold		Swing	+1.7	

Balfour accepted office as Lord Advocate, prompting a by-election.

By-election, 1892: Clackmannanshire and Kinross-shire
Party	Candidate	Votes	%	±%
Liberal	John Balfour	Unopposed		
Liberal hold				

General election 1895: Clackmannan and Kinross Shires
Party	Candidate	Votes	%	±%
Liberal	John Balfour	3,133	54.8	−10.0
Conservative	George Younger	2,588	45.2	+10.0
Majority		545	9.6	−20.0
Turnout		5,721	75.7	+3.1
Registered electors		7,561		
Liberal hold		Swing	−10.0	

Balfour is appointed Lord President of the Court of Session, prompting a by-election.

1899 Clackmannanshire and Kinross-shire by-election
Party	Candidate	Votes	%	±%
Liberal	Eugene Wason	3,489	54.0	−0.8
Conservative	George Younger	2,973	46.0	+0.8
Majority		516	8.0	−1.6
Turnout		6,462	83.7	+8.0
Registered electors		7,722		
Liberal hold		Swing	−0.8	

=== Elections in the 1900s ===
General election 1900: Clackmannan and Kinross Shires
Party	Candidate	Votes	%	±%
Liberal	Eugene Wason	3,284	52.8	−2.0
Conservative	George Younger	2,933	47.2	+2.0
Majority		351	5.6	−4.0
Turnout		6,217	81.7	+6.0
Registered electors		7,609		
Liberal hold		Swing	−2.0	

General election 1906: Clackmannan and Kinross Shires
Party	Candidate	Votes	%	±%
Liberal	Eugene Wason	4,027	60.3	+7.5
Liberal Unionist	James Avon Clyde	2,648	39.7	−7.5
Majority		1,379	20.6	+15.0
Turnout		6,675	84.3	+2.6
Registered electors		7,919		
Liberal hold		Swing	+7.5	

=== Elections in the 1910s ===
Wason

General election, January 1910: Clackmannan and Kinross Shires
Party	Candidate	Votes	%	±%
Liberal	Eugene Wason	3,971	59.5	−0.8
Conservative	Nelson Briggs Constable	2,703	40.5	+0.8
Majority		1,268	19.0	−1.6
Turnout		6,674	82.4	−1.9
Registered electors		8,103		
Liberal hold		Swing	−0.8	

General election, December 1910: Clackmannan and Kinross Shires
Party	Candidate	Votes	%	±%
Liberal	Eugene Wason	Unopposed		
Liberal hold				
