= Forward (Scottish newspaper) =

- Type: Weekly broadsheet
- Founder: Tom Johnston
- Publisher: Forward Printing and Publishing Company; Unity Publishing Company
- Editor: Tom Johnston (1906–1931); Emrys Hughes (1931–1948); George Thomson (1948–1953); Francis Williams (1957–1959)
- Founded: 13 October 1906; 119 years ago
- Ceased publication: 1959
- Political alignment: Left-wing
- Language: English
- City: Glasgow
- Country: Scotland

Forward was a socialist newspaper published in Scotland from 1906 to 1959.

== Early history ==
The newspaper was founded by Tom Johnston. He inherited a printing business from a distant relative which already printed two weekly trades newspapers. In October 1906, he founded the Forward Printing and Publishing Company with the support of the Glasgow branch of the Fabian Society, although most of the shares were owned by Johnston and Roland Muirhead.

The first issue of the newspaper appeared on 13 October 1906, and while committed to socialism and temperance, the paper otherwise welcomed diverse views, regular contributors including John Maclean, James Connolly and the anti-German Stirling Robertson, who was the only writer to support the First World War.

Alongside the newspaper, the company published a range of socialist literature, including Johnston's own work promoting women's suffrage, and Our Scots Noble Families, an anti-aristocratic book which sold more than 100,000 copies.

Johnston was long a member of both the Fabians and the Independent Labour Party (ILP), but by the end of the First World War, he was a member of the ILP's council, and the newspaper became increasingly associated with the party; other contributors were associated with the Red Clydeside movement, and senior Labour Party figures such as Ramsay MacDonald were not invited to submit articles. In 1915, the paper was closed down on the orders of David Lloyd George for reporting a meeting where Lloyd George had a hostile reception from workers, and was only permitted to reopen once Johnston promised not to print anything which might prejudice the war effort - indeed, from opposing the war, it switched to stating that it should be seen through.

== Split from the ILP ==
While Forward continued to feature articles by activists associated with Red Clydeside, this changed after Johnston was re-elected to Parliament in 1924, and became closer to the Labour leadership. Although he initially remained with the ILP when it split from Labour in 1931, he took the opportunity to pass the editorship of the newspaper to Emrys Hughes. Johnston later joined the Scottish Socialist Party (SSP), which affiliated to the Labour Party, and Forward was the SSP's official publication from 1934 until that party's dissolution in 1940.

Hughes had considerable journalistic experience, with the Labour Leader, Daily Herald and Manchester Guardian, and was given the title of acting editor in 1924. Generally in agreement with Johnston, he maintained the policies of socialism and temperance. On becoming editor, he led a campaign against ILP disaffiliation from Labour. He also printed some articles by Trotsky. He took a pacifist position in the Second World War, which led him to break with Johnston, and much of the rest of the Labour movement; during the conflict, almost all the articles in the paper were written by Hughes.

== Later history ==
Johnston left politics in 1946; he sold his shares in the newspaper to a group on the right wing of the Labour Party, and its office was moved to London. Muirhead was bitterly disappointed by this, and in 1950 founded Forward Scotland, a rival paper which acted as the voice of the Scottish National Congress, published until his death in 1964. Meanwhile, in London, Hughes continued as editor of Forward for two more years, but was then sacked by the board of directors for opposing. Despite this, he continued to write a weekly column. George Thomson, who had been assistant editor since the relocation, took over the editorial post, now back in Glasgow, serving for five years.

By 1956, the paper was close to closure. It was purchased by John Diamond, Harry Greenhill and Alf Robens, against the objections of Hughes and Muirhead. They again relocated the paper to London, with Francis Williams as editor and John Harris soon becoming his assistant. They hoped to make it a rival to Tribune, and the Conservative Party was sufficiently concerned to revamp its own rival, Onward. However, Forward failed to prosper, and was closed in 1959.
