= James Johnstone (1801–1888) =

James Johnstone (4 July 1801 – 24 February 1888) was a Scottish Peelite politician.

He was the oldest of 8 sons of James Raymond Johnstone (died 1830) of Alva, who was the son of John Johnstone (1734–1795).

He was elected at a by-election in June 1851 as the Member of Parliament (MP) for Clackmannanshire and Kinross-shire. He was returned unopposed in 1852, and did not contest the 1857 election.

Parliament of the United Kingdom
Preceded by Sir William Morison	Member of Parliament for Clackmannanshire and Kinross-shire; 1851 – 1857	Succeeded by Viscount Melgund
