= John Harris, Baron Harris of Greenwich =

The Right Honourable The Lord Harris of Greenwich PC

Member of the House of Lords
- Lord Temporal
- Life peerage 26 March 1974 – 11 April 2001

Minister of State for Home Affairs
- In office 8 March 1974 – 3 January 1979
- Monarch: Elizabeth II
- Prime Minister: Harold Wilson; James Callaghan
- Preceded by: The Viscount Colville of Culross
- Succeeded by: The Lord Boston of Faversham

Personal details
- Born: John Henry Harris; 5 April 1930 Pinner, Middlesex, England
- Died: 11 April 2001 (aged 71) London, England
- Party: Labour (to 1981); SDP (1981–1988); Liberal Democrats (1988–2001)
- Occupation: Political aide, politician

John Henry Harris, Baron Harris of Greenwich, PC (5 April 1930 – 11 April 2001) was an English journalist, political aide and politician. After serving as a local councillor and political advisor and aide to a number of Labour politicians including Roy Jenkins, he was created a life peer in order to become Minister of State for Home Affairs in the Wilson and Callaghan governments between 1974 and 1979. He became a founder member of the Social Democrats, becoming the Liberal Democrats Chief Whip in the House of Lords between 1994 and 2001.

== Early life ==
Harris was born on 5 April 1930 in Pinner, Middlesex, to Alfred George Harris and his wife, May. He was educated at Pinner County Grammar School before working as a journalist and completing National Service with the Directorate of Army Legal Services.

== Political career ==
He became assistant editor of Forward, a left-wing weekly newspaper, when it was brought to London in 1957, which was the start of his career in politics. He became the parliamentary candidate for Bromley in the same year, but resigned in 1959 when Forward folded and he became personal assistant to Hugh Gaitskell, Leader of the Opposition. Describing Harris's appointment, Tony Benn said that it was "the best thing that has happened to Hugh for years". He rose to become the Labour Party's Director of Publicity between 1962 and 1964. During the same period he was a local councillor for the new town of Harlow (1957–63), becoming chairman between 1960 and 1961 and leader of the Labour group between 1961 and 1963.

Harris became a political adviser when Labour came into government following the 1964 general election, firstly to Foreign Secretary Patrick Gordon Walker, and then to Roy Jenkins successively at the Ministry of Aviation, the Home Office and the Treasury, until the 1970 general election when Labour lost power. He became a political correspondent for The Economist until Labour returned to office in 1974, when he was created a life peer as Baron Harris of Greenwich, of Greenwich in Greater London, and was appointed Minister of State for Home Affairs under Jenkins during the latter's second spell as Home Secretary. He is credited as being a successful minister, and served until January 1979 when he resigned to become Chairman of the Parole Board for England and Wales (1979–1982).

Harris was a leading member of the 'Yes' campaign for the 1975 referendum on whether Britain should remain a member of the European Communities, and was joint chairman of the publicity committee.

He was a founder member of the Social Democrats in 1981, and was a supporter of their merger with the Liberals in 1988. He became the new party's spokesperson in the House of Lords on home affairs until 1994, when he became Chief Whip. He was appointed to the Privy Council in 1998.

He held a number of other positions, including: trustee and chairman of UK's policing think tank, The Police Foundation, which he founded in 1979; President of the National Association of Senior Probation Officers (1983–1992); and board member and chairman of Westward Television.

He died in London on 11 April 2001.

== Personal life and character ==
He married twice, firstly to Patricia Margaret Alstrom in 1952, with whom he had two children. The marriage was dissolved in 1982, and he married Angela Smith in 1983.

His obituary in The Guardian described him as "probably the first ever spin doctor", and said:

Harris was, in his own way, a distinguished public servant, rejecting what would have been lucrative opportunities in the world of public relations, and not revealing in memoirs the confidences he received during his long career. He was always loyal to his many friends, who valued his opinions and enjoyed his company, although at heart he was a shy, rather than a gregarious, man.

— William Rodgers, The Guardian, 13 April 2001

Speaking to BBC News, Liberal Democrat leader Charles Kennedy said Harris was "an exceptionally gifted all-rounder whose experience and insights dating back to Gaitskell were invaluable". Paying tribute in the House of Lords, Lord Henley said that "he always behaved with integrity" and that when they were in agreement on an issue he could "always rely on his robustness in argument and on the iron discipline with which he marshalled his troops". Jenkins followed, saying:

He was to me a counsellor of buoyancy, humour, flair and instinctive political wisdom, whose presence in any moment of bafflement—and there were many moments of bafflement in ministerial and political life—not only shone a clear light of good sense but made vicissitudes more bearable.

— Roy Jenkins, House of Lords, 23 April 2001
