= William Arrol =

British politician (1839–1913)

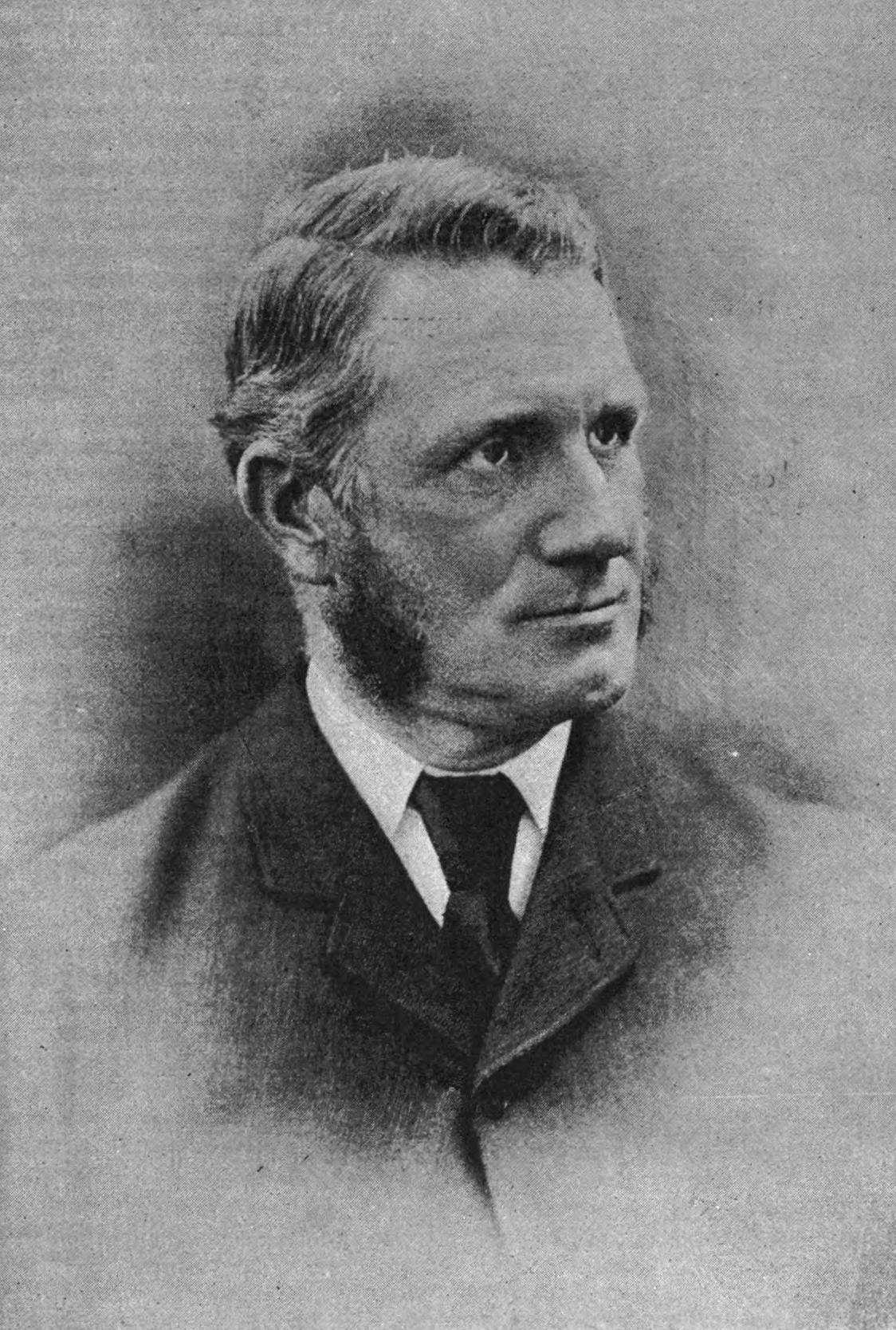
Portrait of William Arrol

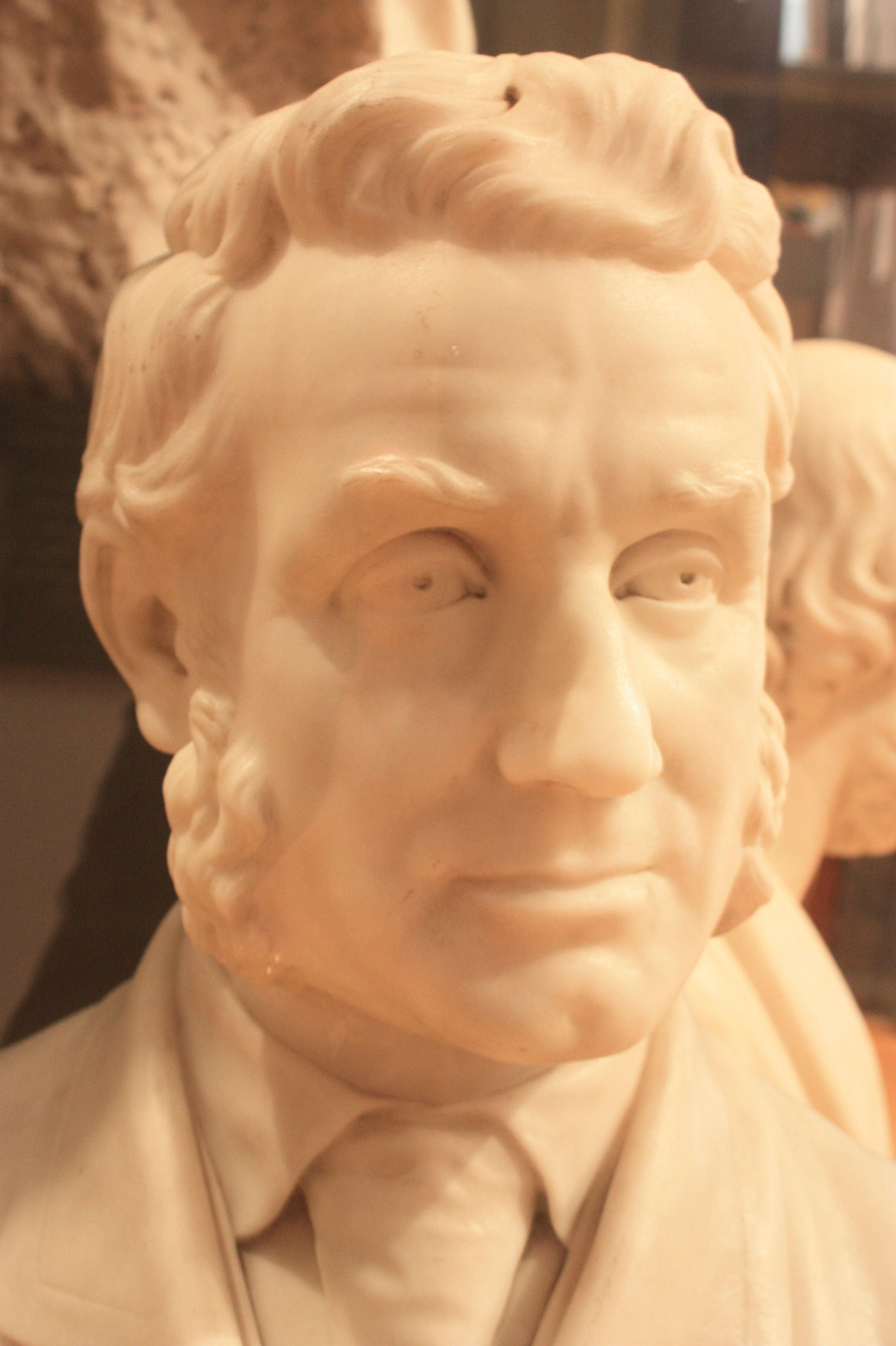
Bust of William Arrol, People's Palace museum, Glasgow

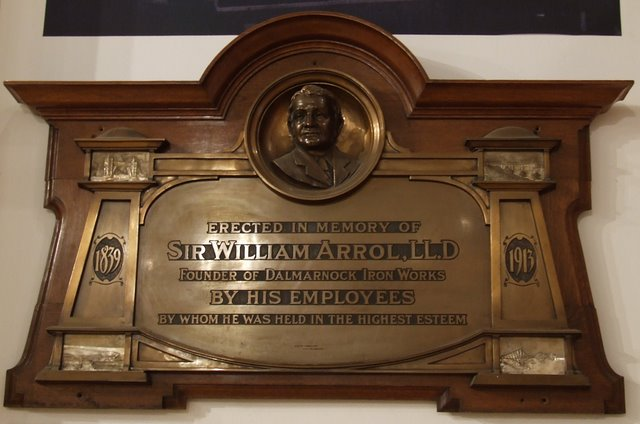
Memorial to Sir William Arrol, now on display in the Glasgow People's Palace

Sir William Arrol (13 February 1839 – 20 February 1913) was a Scottish civil engineer, bridge builder, and Liberal Unionist Party politician.

== Early life ==
The son of a spinner, Arrol was born in Houston, Renfrewshire, and started work in a cotton mill at only 9 years of age, prior to commencing training as a blacksmith by age 13, and going on to learn mechanics and hydraulics at night school.

== Career ==
In 1863 he joined a company of bridge manufacturers in Glasgow, but by 1872 he had established his own business, the Dalmarnock Iron Works, in the east end of the city. The business evolved to become Sir William Arrol & Co., a large international civil engineering business.

Projects undertaken by the business under his leadership included the replacement for the Tay Bridge (completed in 1887), the Forth Bridge (completed in 1890) and Tower Bridge (completed in 1894). He was also contracted by the Harland and Wolff Shipyard, Belfast, to construct a large gantry (known as the Arrol Gantry) for the construction of three new super-liners, one of which was the RMS Titanic.

Arrol was knighted in 1890, and elected as the Liberal Unionist Member of Parliament (MP) for South Ayrshire at the 1895 general election, serving the constituency until 1906. He served as President of The Institution of Engineers and Shipbuilders in Scotland from 1895–97. He spent the latter years of his life on his estate at Seafield House, near Ayr, where he died on 20 February 1913. He is buried in Woodside Cemetery, Paisley, on the north side of the main east-west path on the crest of the hill.

== Legacy ==
In 2013 he was one of four inductees to the Scottish Engineering Hall of Fame. His image is also featured on the Clydesdale Bank £5 note introduced in 2015.

== See also ==
- People on Scottish banknotes

Parliament of the United Kingdom
| Preceded by Eugene Wason | Member of Parliament for South Ayrshire; 1895 – 1906 | Succeeded by Sir William Phipson Beale |
