= Claud Alexander =

Scottish politician

Sir Claud Alexander Bt
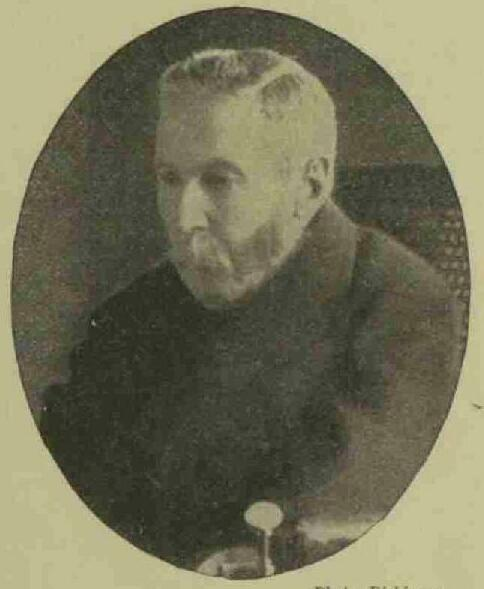

1st Baronet
- In office 1886–1899
- Succeeded by: Sir Claud Alexander

Member of the British Parliament for South Ayrshire
- In office 1874–1885

Personal details
- Born: 15 January 1831
- Died: 23 May 1899 (aged 68)
- Party: Conservative
- Spouse: Eliza Speirs
- Education: Christ Church, Oxford

Military service
- Rank: Major-general
- Unit: Grenadier Guards
- Battles/wars: Crimean War
- Awards: Crimean Medal and Clasp; Turkish War Medal; Order of the Medjidie 5th Class

Sir Claud Alexander, 1st Baronet (15 January 1831 – 23 May 1899) was a Scottish Conservative Party politician who sat in the House of Commons from 1874 to 1885.

== Life ==
Alexander was the eldest son of Boyd Alexander and his wife Sophia Elizabeth Hobhouse, daughter of Sir Benjamin Hobhouse. He was educated at Eton College and Christ Church, Oxford. In 1849, he joined the Grenadier Guards. He served in the Crimean War including at the Siege of Sevastapol. He was awarded the Crimean Medal and Clasp, the Turkish War Medal and the Order of the Medjidie 5th Class. He reached the rank of Colonel in 1870. He was a Justice of the Peace and Deputy Lieutenant for Ayrshire and Renfrewshire.

In 1868 Alexander stood unsuccessfully for parliament at Ayrshire South. At the 1874 general election he was elected Member of Parliament for Ayrshire South. He passed the "Industrial Schools Acts Amendment Act" in 1880. He held the seat until 1885. He was created a baronet in 1886.

He was elected a Fellow of the Zoological Society of London (FZS) in 1903.

Alexander lived at Ballochmyle House, which he extended in 1886. He died at the age of 68.

== Family ==
Alexander married Eliza Speirs, daughter of Alexander Speirs of Elderslie who was Lord Lieutenant of Renfrewshire. He was succeeded as baronet by his son, also called Claud, who founded the British Cat Club in 1901.

Parliament of the United Kingdom
Preceded by Sir David Wedderburn, Bt	Member of Parliament for South Ayrshire; 1874–1885	Succeeded by Eugene Wason
Baronetage of the United Kingdom
New creation	Baronet (of Ballochmyle); 1886–1899	Succeeded by Claud Alexander
