= Sir Douglas Alexander, 1st Baronet =

Sir Douglas Alexander Bt
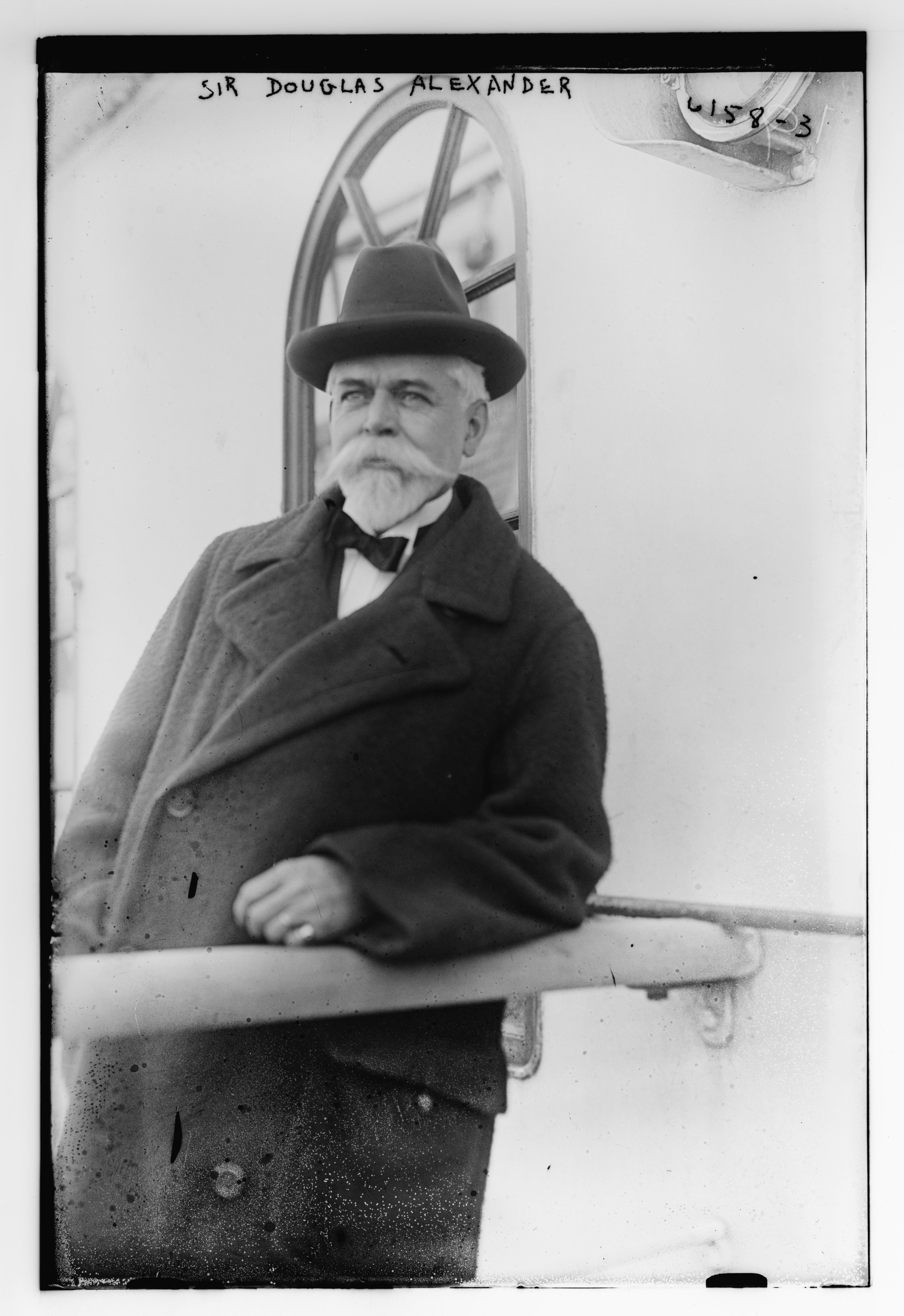

6th President of the Singer Manufacturing Company
- In office 1905–1949
- Preceded by: Frederick Gilbert Bourne
- Succeeded by: Milton C. Lightner

Personal details
- Born: 4 July 1864 Halifax, West Riding of Yorkshire, England
- Died: 22 May 1949 (aged 84) Stamford, Connecticut, United States
- Spouse: Helen Hamilton Gillespie (m. 1892; died 1923)
- Children: 4
- Education: Hamilton Collegiate Institute
- Occupation: Lawyer, executive

Sir Douglas Alexander, 1st Baronet (4 July 1864 – 22 May 1949) was a British-born Canadian industrialist.

== Early life ==
Alexander was born in Halifax, Yorkshire, on 4 July 1864. He was the son of Andrew Alexander, a horticulturist and botanist. His parents emigrated to Canada when he was a child and he was brought up in Hamilton, Ontario.

He was educated at the Hamilton Collegiate Institute and called to the bar in 1886.

== Career ==
After practising for a few years in Hamilton, he joined the Singer Manufacturing Company as a clerk in 1891, where he was to stay for the rest of his career. In 1896, he was appointed to the board and moved to New York City. In 1905, he succeeded Frederick Gilbert Bourne to become the sixth president, holding the position until his death forty-four years later.

Alexander was created a baronet of Edgehill, near Stamford, Connecticut, on 2 July 1921, by King George V in the 1921 Birthday Honours for his services to the welfare of industrial workers during World War I.

== Personal life ==
In 1892, Alexander was married to Helen Hamilton Gillespie (1864–1923), the daughter of George Hamilton Gillespie and Elizabeth Agnes Gillespie. Together, they were the parents of:

- Elizabeth Agnes Alexander (1895–1944), who died unmarried.
- Helen Douglas Alexander (1897–1984), who became an artist and did not marry.
- Sir Douglas Hamilton Alexander, 2nd Baronet (1900–1983), a 1921 graduate of Princeton University who did not marry and lived with his sister Helen.
- Archibald Gillespie Alexander (1907–1978), who became a Lieutenant commander in the United States Coast Guard during World War II. He married Margery Isabel Griffith, daughter of Arthur Brown Griffith.

Lady Alexander died on 19 March 1923 at The Dakota, their New York City residence at 1 West 72nd Street, and her funeral was thereafter held at Hamilton, Ontario. In October 1925, an armed robber broke into the Alexander residence on Palmer Road in Stamford, Connecticut, pushing his daughter Agnes down, slashing his son Douglas, and stealing $81.

Sir Douglas died at the Stamford Hospital on 22 May 1949. After a funeral held at St. John's Protestant Episcopal Church in Stamford, he was buried alongside his wife in Hamilton, Ontario. In his will he left his entire estate to his eldest son and no provision for his daughter and son Archibald, "for the reason that they are otherwise amply provided for." After his death, the family sold the 22 acre Connecticut estate, the home was torn down and, in the early 1990s, a retirement community was built there.

=== Descendants ===
Through his second son Archibald, he was the grandfather of Sir Douglas Alexander, 3rd Baronet (b. 1936), who became the third baronet in 1983 upon the death of his uncle, the second baronet. The third baronet married Marylon Scatterday, daughter of Leonidas Collins Scatterday, in 1958. His two other grandchildren were Archibald Bonsall Alexander (b. 1940) and Margery Griffith Alexander (b. 1945).

== Arms ==
Coat of arms of Sir Douglas Alexander, 1st Baronet

Crest
In front of a talbot's head erased Sable gorged with a collar gemel Gules two crescents Or.
Escutcheon
Azure on a chevron between three lymphads sails furled oars in action Or as many grenades fired Proper.
Motto
Vita Perit Labor Non Moritur

Baronetage of the United Kingdom
New creation	Baronet (of Edgehill); 1921–1949	Douglas Hamilton Alexander
