= Eugene Wason =

Scottish politician (1846-1927)

Eugene Wason

Eugene Wason (26 January 1846 – 19 April 1927) was a Scottish lawyer and Liberal politician who sat in the House of Commons in three periods between 1885 and 1918.

== Family ==
Eugene Wason came from a Liberal family. His father, brother and son-in-law, were all Liberal Members of Parliament. His father was Rigby Wason sometime MP for Ipswich, his brother was Cathcart Wason the MP for Orkney and Shetland from 1900 to 1921 (and previously an MP in New Zealand 1876–79), first elected as a Liberal Unionist but later switching to the Liberals and his daughter Minna married John William Crombie who was MP for Kincardineshire from 1892 to 1908. In 1870, Wason married Eleanor Mary from Dolgelly, the daughter of C. R. Williams, Deputy Lieutenant of Merionethshire. They had three sons and two daughters.

== Stature and character ==
Wason, like his brother Cathcart, was well over 6 feet tall. He was described by one of the contemporary Speakers of the House of Commons as 'the largest and tallest man in the House.' Sir Percy Harris who was Liberal MP for Bethnal Green South West and whose father was a close friend of Wason's has recorded that Eugene and Cathcart were giants, Eugene being thick set and heavy while Cathcart was willowy and thin. Harris related that the story always told about Eugene was that if he stepped on a weighing machine the hands would go on until they could no farther as he topped the maximum 20 stone mark on the dial. Not surprisingly, according to Harris, Eugene was fond of his food and wine,) although he was also a keen sportsman listing his recreations in Who's Who in his younger days as football, shooting, rowing, and fishing although in later life these pursuits turned into reading, bridge, backgammon, and the card game picquet.

== Education ==
Wason was educated first privately in France at Boulogne-sur-Mer, then at Rock Ferry in Cheshire before going to Rugby School. While at Rugby, Wason served in the School Rifle Corps, achieving the rank of Lieutenant. He later became a member of the 8th Ayrshire Rifle Volunteers. After Rugby, Wason went to Wadham College, Oxford where he gained a BA degree in 1868 and an MA in 1870. While he was a student at Oxford, Wason rowed in Trial Eights in 1865 and 1866 and was Captain of Wadham College Boat Club. He was also winner of the University foils for 1868.

== Career ==
Wason's chosen professions were the law and politics. He was called to the Bar by the Middle Temple in 1870 and practised on the Northern Circuit. Whether he did not at first take to being a barrister or perhaps just to gain greater legal experience, in 1872 Wason was disbarred as a barrister at his own request in order to become a solicitor. He was admitted as a solicitor in 1876, becoming a partner in Williams, James & Wason until 1885. Again at his own request, Wason was struck off the Rolls in 1886, ceasing to be a solicitor, in order to gain readmission as a member of the Bar the following week. This was deemed a unique experience, Wason having been both disbarred and struck off the Rolls, but each time at his own request. From 1878 to 1882, Wason served as Assistant Examiner to the Incorporated Law Society in Common Law.

== Politics ==
=== MP for South Ayrshire ===
Wason was first elected to Parliament at the 1885 general election for the constituency of Ayrshire South. This was his local seat as his home was at Blair, Dailly, a village in the county. He held the seat only until the 1886 election when he lost to a Liberal Unionist but regained it at the 1892 general election and then served as its MP until 1895 when he again forfeited the seat to a Liberal Unionist, Sir William Arrol.

=== MP for Clackmannanshire and Kinross-shire ===
Wason returned to Parliament in December 1899. The sitting Liberal MP for Clackmannan and Kinross, J B Balfour became a judge and resigned his seat. Wason was selected as Liberal candidate and fighting the by-election against the background of the war in South Africa he managed to hold the seat, beating his Conservative opponent George Younger albeit by a marginally reduced majority of 516 – down from 545 at the previous general election.

After his by-election victory, Wason retained his Clackmannan and Kinross seat at the 1900 general election in a straight fight with the Conservatives by a majority of 351. In the Liberal landslide election of 1906 he increased his majority over the Conservatives to 1,379 and in January 1910 he maintained his advantage by a majority of 1,268. In December 1910 he was returned unopposed. By 1918 Wason was 72 years old and decided to retire from Parliament at the next election. He therefore stood down from Parliament at the 1918 election.

=== Scottish MP ===
Wason became a veteran MP, serving nearly 25 years in all. He was Chairman of the Scottish Liberal members for ten years from 1908 to 1918 and was always a keen supporter of Scottish interests. He spoke in Parliament in favour of Home Rule for Scotland. He presided at the meeting of Scottish Liberal members at the House of Commons which urged the government to implement the motion passed at the Scottish National Liberal Council at Dunfermline on 22 October 1910 which called for Home Rule to enable Scottish reforms to be carried through, adapted to the traditions, circumstances and aspirations of the Scottish people. He served as Honorary President of the Scottish Chamber of Agriculture and later led a deputation of Scottish Liberal MPs to prime minister H H Asquith in his room at the House of Commons on 25 April 1912 urging the introduction of a Bill for Scottish self-government in the next Session. According to another source the delegation saw the prime minister again on 6 May 1912 and, while agreeing there was no groundswell of opinion in Scotland for home rule, there was 'concern and disgruntlement at the general neglect of Scottish affairs' and they told Asquith they were worried this might escalate if not dealt with through an element of devolution.

=== Radical MP? ===
In the obituary of Wason written for The Times newspaper, he was described as a political Radical. He was said to be a frequent speaker in the House of Commons (unlike his brother Cathcart) and usually gave expression to advanced radical views. On one important radical issue of the day, women's suffrage, he himself claimed to have always voted in favour. His support of Home Rule all Round was also indicative of radical sentiments. However, after he left Parliament, in the days when the old Liberal tradition was collapsing under the strains and stresses of party splits, the confusion of the electorate as to Liberal policy and the massive expansion of the electorate as a result of the Representation of the People Act 1918, Wason's radicalism was tested. At the general elections of 1923 and 1924 in Wason's home area of South Ayrshire no Liberal candidate could be persuaded to stand, leaving a straight fight between Labour and Conservative parties. Faced with this choice at a time of polarisation in British politics, with Liberalism at a low ebb in Ayrshire, Wason supported the Conservative.

=== Other political and public offices ===
In July 1902, Wason was appointed to be a member of the important Select committee on National Expenditure. Other members appointed at that time included Winston Churchill, Bonar Law and Austen Chamberlain.

In 1907, Wason was created a Privy Councillor after which he was able to be termed The Right Honourable and was eligible to receive sensitive government information on highly confidential terms.

In June 1915 he was appointed by the then Secretary for Scotland Thomas McKinnon Wood as Chairman of a Committee on Food Production in Scotland (under the auspices of the Board of Agriculture for Scotland) to make recommendations about maintaining and increasing food production on the assumption the war would last beyond the harvest of 1916. He also served as a member of the Committee on the Scottish National War Memorial. In 1917 he was made a Deputy Lieutenant for the County of Ayrshire and was for some years a Justice of the Peace in Ayrshire.

== Travel ==
Wason enjoyed foreign travel throughout his life and twice went round the world; in 1886–87 by India, China, Japan, San Francisco, and America, and in 1896–97 by Australia, New Zealand, Fiji, Hawaii, Vancouver, and Canada. His overseas vacationing landed him in serious difficulty at the outbreak of the First World War. In the summer of 1914, Wason was on holiday in the Spa resort of Marienbad (now called Mariánské Lázně) in what was then the Austro-Hungarian Imperial province of Bohemia (now the Czech Republic). He was detained there as an enemy alien until September when he was allowed to travel to neutral Switzerland along with 200 other British subjects who had been taking the waters there and at the other nearby Spa town of Karlsbad (now called Karlovy Vary). He arrived in Geneva on 4 September and from there returned to England.

== Burns Night, 1918 ==
Wason attended a Burns Night dinner in honour of the Allied Nations at the Criterion Restaurant in London on 25 January 1918 as one of the guests of the London Robert Burns Club. Unfortunately however the guests had to do without the traditional dish of haggis. The haggis had been ordered but owing to the food restrictions in Scotland caused by the war, the necessary ingredients were not available. This was ironical in view of Wason's previous role as Chairman of the Committee on Food Production in Scotland. The guests had to make do with what The Times newspaper report of the event described as 'an Italian dish' (otherwise unspecified) but which was properly piped in by the bagpipes.

== Death ==
Wason died at his London home in Sussex Gardens, Hyde Park on 20 April 1927 aged 81 years.

Parliament of the United Kingdom
Preceded by Claud Alexander	Member of Parliament for South Ayrshire; 1885–1886	Succeeded by Greville Richard Vernon
Preceded by Greville Richard Vernon	Member of Parliament for South Ayrshire; 1892–1895	Succeeded by William Arrol
Preceded by John Balfour	Member of Parliament for Clackmannanshire and Kinross-shire; 1899–1918	Succeeded by Ralph Glyn as MP for Clackmannan and Eastern Stirlingshire
