= Emrys Hughes =

Welsh politician and journalist

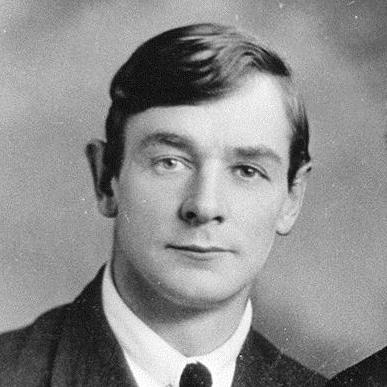
- Born: 10 July 1894; Tonypandy, Rhondda, Wales
- Died: 27 June 1969 (aged 74)
- Spouse: Nan Hardie

Emrys Daniel Hughes (10 July 1894 – 18 October 1969) was a Welsh Labour Party politician, journalist and author. He was Labour MP for South Ayrshire in Scotland from 1946 to 1969. Among his many published books was a biography of his father-in-law, Keir Hardie.

== Life ==
Hughes was born in Tonypandy, Wales, the son of J. R. Hughes, a Calvinistic Methodist minister, and his wife Annie. He was educated at Abercynon Council School, Mountain Ash Secondary School and City of Leeds Training College. While working as a teacher and journalist in the Rhondda, he became a strong supporter of the Labour Party and of Keir Hardie, the Labour MP for Merthyr Tydfil.

Hughes was, like Hardie, a pacifist. He opposed the First World War and was imprisoned as a conscientious objector.

In the 1923 General Election, Hughes was the unsuccessful Labour candidate for Bosworth, Leicestershire, a constituency which combined coal-mining communities and a substantial agricultural tradition.

From 1924 to 1948, Hughes edited the Scottish socialist journal Forward. In the late 1930s, Forward was one of the few British left-wing publications to criticise the Moscow Trials. Hughes' pacifist position in World War II was reflected in Forward: for the duration of the war he wrote most of the paper's articles.

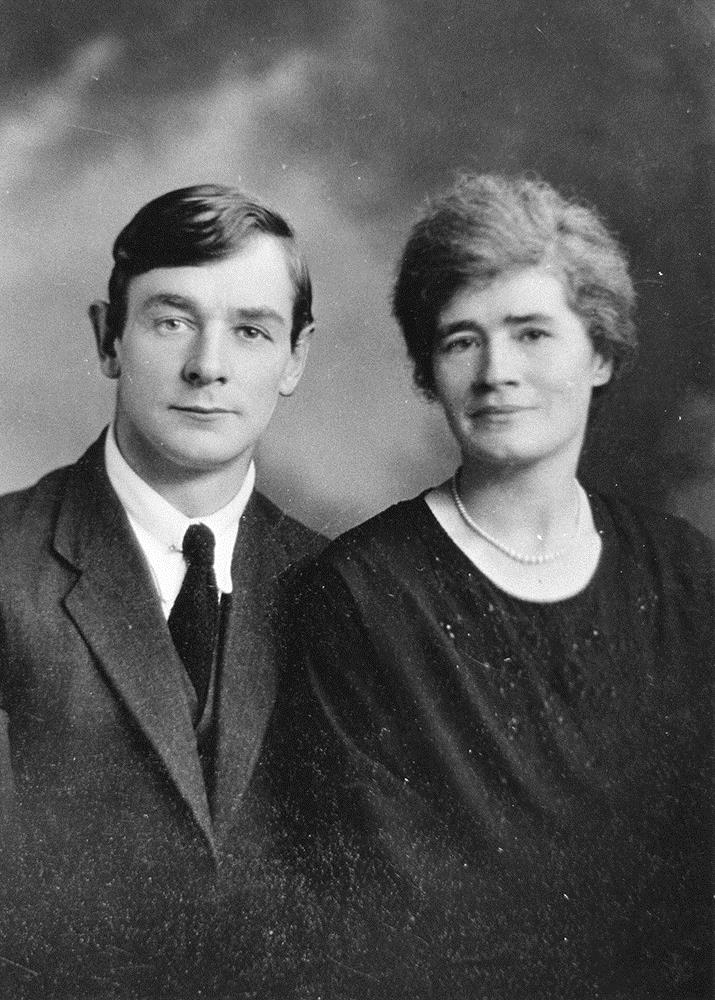
Emrys Hughes and Nan Hardie

In 1924, Hughes married Nan Hardie (1885–1947), Keir Hardie's daughter. Hughes and Nan Hardie shared the same political philosophy and ideals. As Labour councillors on the town council in Cumnock, South Ayrshire, they worked together for slum clearance and the provision of council housing. Both were provost of the council. After Nan's death, Hughes married in 1949 Martha Cleland, daughter of P.M. Cleland, a Glasgow schoolmaster.

Hughes was first elected to Parliament at the by-election on 7 February 1946 for South Ayrshire caused by the death of Alexander Sloan, the sitting Labour MP. Hughes was re-elected in the general elections of 1950, 1951, 1955, 1959, 1964, and 1966. As a left-winger and pacifist, Hughes was a frequent rebel against the party's leadership. He twice had the whip withdrawn, between November 1954 and April 1955 (over German rearmament), and between March 1961 and May 1963 (over nuclear weapons). His Constituency Labour Party always supported him in his clashes with the leadership.

In 1947 Hughes with other backbench M.P.s on the left of the Labour Party formed the Keep Left Group. The group's manifesto was set out in the pamphlet Keep Left, jointly written by Michael Foot, Richard Crossman and Ian Mikardo, signed by other members of the Group, and published by the New Statesman. This argued for the U.K. to pursue a democratic socialist "third force" foreign policy : it rejected the increasingly polarised cold war, and aimed for a socialist Europe not tied to the United States or the Soviet Union. This directly challenged the pro-American foreign policy of Ernest Bevin, Labour's foreign secretary. In 1950 the Group issued a further pamphlet, Keeping Left.

In a parliamentary debate in 1949, Hughes declared the Britain would be safer in the age of nuclear weapons if the Royal Air Force would be disbanded. In 1952, Hughes caused further controversy by calling for a reduction of the civil list payments to the British royal family. During the debate, Hughes identified himself as an anti-monarchist and "a republican, like President Eisenhower".

On 14 July 1966, Gwynfor Evans (Plaid Cymru) won Carmarthen from Labour in a by-election. Emrys Hughes was "one of the few to extend the hand of friendship". Hughes supported in the House of Commons Gwynfor Evans' right to take the oath in the Welsh language. When Winifred Ewing of the SNP won the Hamilton by-election from Labour in 1967, Hughes was similarly welcoming.

Hughes died on 18 October 1969, while still an MP. His papers were deposited at the National Library of Scotland.

== Selected works ==
- Winston Churchill. British Bulldog: His Career in War and Peace, Exposition Books, 1955. ASIN:B0006ATSO8 (first published in 1950)
- Keir Hardie, Allen & Unwin, 1956. ASIN:B0006DBKFK
- Emrys Hughes, M.P. on POLARIS and the ARMS RACE, Housmans, 1961. ASIN:B003Z94NXI
- Harold Macmillan : Portrait of a Politician, Allen & Unwin, 1962. ISBN 978-0-04-923013-2
- Alec Douglas-Home. Modern Conservative, Housmans, 1964. ASIN: B002A6S6OE
- Sydney Silverman – Rebel in Parliament, C Skilton, 1969. ASIN:B001KIB9T2

== See also ==
- List of peace activists

Media offices
| Preceded by Tom Johnston | Editor of Forward; 1931–1948 | Succeeded by George Thomson |
Parliament of the United Kingdom
| Preceded by Alexander Sloan | Member of Parliament for South Ayrshire; 1946–1969 | Succeeded by Jim Sillars |
