= Greville Vernon =

Greville Richard Vernon (1835 – 19 February 1909) was a Liberal Unionist politician in Scotland. He was the Member of Parliament (MP) for South Ayrshire from 1886 to 1892. He was the youngest son of Robert Vernon, 1st Baron Lyveden.

Parliament of the United Kingdom
Preceded by Eugene Wason	Member of Parliament for South Ayrshire; 1886–1892	Succeeded by Eugene Wason
