= Alexander baronets =

Baronetcy in the Baronetage of the United Kingdom

There have been five baronetcies created for persons with the surname Alexander, one in the Baronetage of Nova Scotia and four in the Baronetage of the United Kingdom. Four of the creations are extant as of 2010.

The Alexander Baronetcy, of Menstre in the County of Clackmannan, was created in the Baronetage of Nova Scotia on 12 July 1625. For more information on this creation, see Earl of Stirling.

The Alexander, later Cable-Alexander Baronetcy, of the City of Dublin, was created in the Baronetage of the United Kingdom on 11 December 1809. For more information on this creation, see Cable-Alexander baronets.

The Alexander, later Hagart-Alexander Baronetcy, of Ballochmyle in the County of Ayr, was created in the Baronetage of the United Kingdom on 22 January 1886. For more information on this creation, see Hagart-Alexander baronets.

The Alexander Baronetcy, of Edgehill, Stamford, in Connecticut in the United States of America, was created in the Baronetage of the United Kingdom on 2 July 1921 for the British-born Canadian businessman Douglas Alexander. As of 2010 the title is held by his grandson, the third Baronet, who succeeded his uncle in 1983.

The Alexander Baronetcy, of Sundridge Park in the County of Kent, was created in the Baronetage of the United Kingdom on 19 November 1945 for the shipowner and shipbroker Sir Frank Alexander. He was Lord Mayor of London from 1944 to 1945. As of 2019, the title is held by his great-grandson, the fourth Baronet, who succeeded his father in that year.

== Alexander baronets, of Menstre (1625) ==
- see Earl of Stirling

== Alexander, later Cable-Alexander baronets, of the City of Dublin (1809) ==
- see Cable-Alexander baronets

== Alexander, later Hagart-Alexander baronets, of Ballochmyle (1886) ==
- see Hagart-Alexander baronets

== Alexander baronets, of Edgehill (1921) ==
- Sir Douglas Alexander, 1st Baronet (1864–1949)
- Sir Douglas Hamilton Alexander, 2nd Baronet (1900–1983)
- Sir Douglas Alexander, 3rd Baronet (born 1936)

The heir apparent is Douglas Gillespie Alexander (born 1962)

== Alexander baronets, of Sundridge Park (1945) ==
- Sir Frank Samuel Alexander, 1st Baronet (1881–1959); educated Highgate School; Lord Mayor of London 1944-1945
- Sir Charles Gundry Alexander, 2nd Baronet (1923–2009)
- Sir Richard Alexander, 3rd Baronet (1947–2019)
- Sir Edward Samuel Alexander, 4th Baronet (born 1974)

The heir presumptive is the current holder's brother, James Gundry Alexander (born 1977)

== See also ==
- Cable-Alexander baronets
- Hagart-Alexander baronets
