= Sandy Sloan =

Alexander Sloan (11 November 1879 – 16 November 1945) was Labour MP for South Ayrshire, in Scotland.

Sloan worked as a coal miner in Ayrshire, and joined the Ayrshire Miners' Union. The union was affiliated to the National Union of Scottish Mineworkers, and Sloan served as general secretary of both organisations. In addition, he served as a Labour Party member of Ayrshire County Council for many years.

Sloan was elected to Parliament in the 1939 South Ayrshire by-election, and served until his death, in 1945.

One of his brothers – one of four who died in the First World War – was the footballer Donald Sloan. His great-great-granddaughter, Katy Clark, is a member of the House of Lords, The Scottish Parliament and was the Labour MP for North Ayrshire and Arran from 2005 to 2015.

Trade union offices
Preceded by James Brown	Secretary of the National Union of Scottish Mineworkers; 1936–1940	Succeeded by James Cook
Preceded by James Brown	Secretary of the Ayrshire Miners' Union; 1939–1944?	Succeeded by Dan Sim?
Parliament of the United Kingdom
Preceded by James Brown	Member of Parliament for South Ayrshire; 1939–1945	Succeeded by Emrys Hughes
