= South Ayrshire (UK Parliament constituency) =

Parliamentary constituency in the United Kingdom, 1868–1983

- Former county constituency for the House of Commons
- Subdivisions of Scotland: Ayrshire

1868–1983
- Seats: One
- Created from: Ayrshire
- Replaced by: Carrick, Cumnock and Doon Valley

South Ayrshire was a county constituency of the House of Commons of the Parliament of the United Kingdom from 1868 until 1983, when it was abolished. It returned one Member of Parliament (MP), elected by the first past the post voting system.

== Boundaries ==
The Representation of the People (Scotland) Act 1868 provided that the new South Ayrshire constituency was to consist of the District of Kyle and Carrick, consisting of the parishes of Auchinleck, Ayr, Ballantrae, Barr, Colmonell, Coylton, Craigie, Dailly, Dalmellington, Dalrymple, Dundonald, Galston, Girvan, Kirkmichael, Kirkoswald, Mauchline, Maybole, Monkton and Prestwick, Muirkirk, New Cumnock, Newton-on-Ayr, Ochiltree, Old Cumnock, Riccarton, St Quivox, Sorn, Stair, Straiton, Symington and Tarbolton, minus the burghs of Ayr, Prestwick and Troon, which formed a part of the Ayr Burghs constituency.

From 1918 the constituency consisted of "The county districts of Ayr and Carrick, inclusive of all burghs situated therein except insofar as included in the Ayr District of Burghs."

== Members of Parliament ==
Year	Member	Whip
1868	constituency created, see Ayrshire	
1868	Sir David Wedderburn	Liberal
1874	Claud Alexander	Conservative
1885	Eugene Wason	Liberal
1886	Greville Vernon	Liberal Unionist
1892	Eugene Wason	Liberal
1895	Sir William Arrol	Liberal Unionist
1906	Sir William Beale	Liberal
1918	James Brown	Labour
1931	James MacAndrew	Unionist
1935	James Brown	Labour
1939	Alexander Sloan	Labour
1946	Emrys Hughes	Labour
1970	Jim Sillars	Labour
1976	Jim Sillars	Scottish Labour
1979	George Foulkes	Labour
1983	constituency abolished, see Carrick, Cumnock and Doon Valley	

== Election results ==
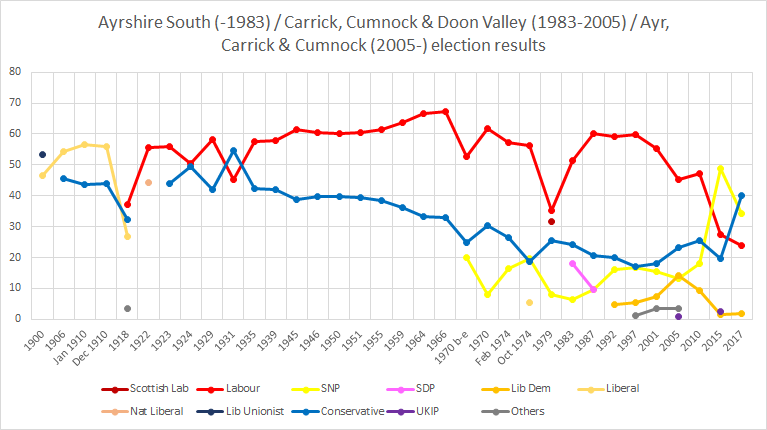
South Ayrshire electoral history

=== Election in the 1860s ===
General election 1868: South Ayrshire
Party	Candidate	Votes	%	±%
Liberal	David Wedderburn	1,416	50.4	
Conservative	Claud Alexander	1,391	49.6	
Majority		25	0.8	
Turnout		2,807	83.3	
Registered electors		3,370		
Liberal win (new seat)				

=== Elections in the 1870s ===
General election 1874: South Ayrshire
Party	Candidate	Votes	%	±%
Conservative	Claud Alexander	Unopposed		
Registered electors		3,547		
Conservative gain from Liberal				

=== Elections in the 1880s ===
General election 1880: South Ayrshire
Party	Candidate	Votes	%	±%
Conservative	Claud Alexander	1,830	53.6	N/A
Liberal	North de Coigny Dalrymple-Hamilton	1,583	46.4	New
Majority		247	7.2	N/A
Turnout		3,413	88.3	N/A
Registered electors		3,865		
Conservative hold		Swing	N/A	

General election 1885: South Ayrshire
Party	Candidate	Votes	%	±%
Liberal	Eugene Wason	7,357	55.3	+8.9
Conservative	Claud Alexander	5,447	44.7	−8.9
Majority		1,411	10.6	N/A
Turnout		13,303	88.0	−0.3
Registered electors		15,109		
Liberal gain from Conservative		Swing	+8.9	

General election 1886: South Ayrshire
Party	Candidate	Votes	%	±%
Liberal Unionist	Greville Vernon	6,123	50.0	+5.3
Liberal	Eugene Wason	6,118	50.0	−5.3
Majority		5	0.0	N/A
Turnout		12,241	81.0	−7.0
Registered electors		15,109		
Liberal Unionist gain from Liberal		Swing	+5.3	

=== Elections in the 1890s ===
General election 1892: South Ayrshire
Party	Candidate	Votes	%	±%
Liberal	Eugene Wason	6,535	50.8	+0.8
Liberal Unionist	William Arrol	6,338	49.2	−0.8
Majority		197	1.6	N/A
Turnout		12,873	86.3	+5.3
Registered electors		14,912		
Liberal gain from Liberal Unionist		Swing	+0.8	

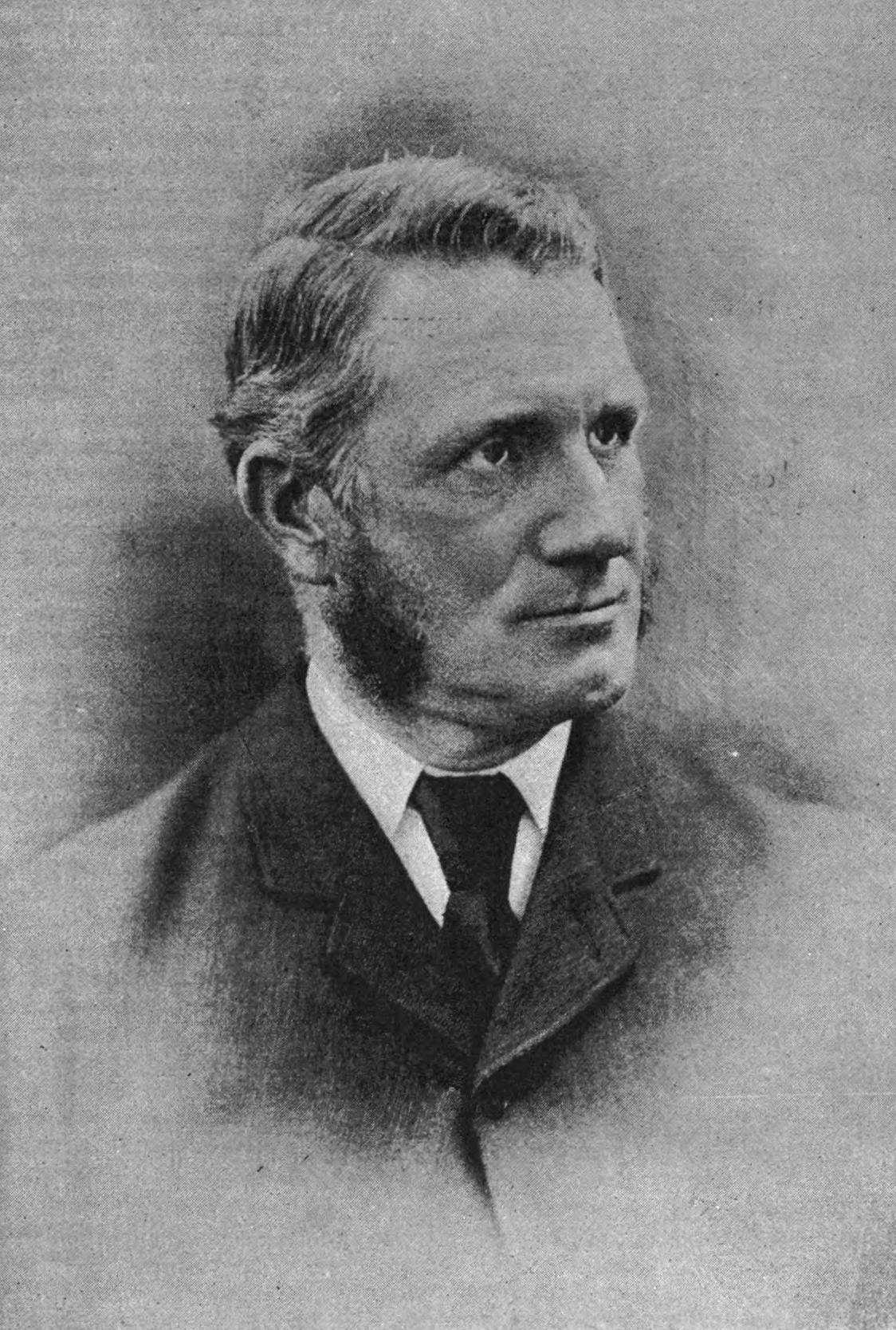
Arrol

General election 1895: South Ayrshire
Party	Candidate	Votes	%	±%
Liberal Unionist	William Arrol	6,875	52.1	+2.9
Liberal	Eugene Wason	6,325	47.9	−2.9
Majority		550	4.2	N/A
Turnout		13,200	85.4	−0.9
Registered electors		15,463		
Liberal Unionist gain from Liberal		Swing	+2.9	

=== Elections in the 1900s ===
General election 1900: South Ayrshire
Party	Candidate	Votes	%	±%
Liberal Unionist	William Arrol	6,615	53.5	+1.4
Liberal	Edward Alexander James Johnson-Ferguson	5,753	46.5	−1.4
Majority		862	7.0	+2.8
Turnout		12,368	77.6	−7.8
Registered electors		15,941		
Liberal Unionist hold		Swing	+1.4	

Beale

General election 1906: South Ayrshire
Party	Candidate	Votes	%	±%
Liberal	William Beale	7,853	54.3	+7.8
Conservative	James J. Bell	6,611	45.7	−7.8
Majority		1,242	8.6	N/A
Turnout		14,464	82.7	+5.1
Registered electors		17,497		
Liberal gain from Liberal Unionist		Swing	+7.8	

=== Elections in the 1910s ===
General election January 1910: South Ayrshire
Party	Candidate	Votes	%	±%
Liberal	William Beale	8,833	56.5	+2.2
Conservative	Thomas Walker McIntyre	6,793	43.5	−2.2
Majority		2,040	13.0	+4.4
Turnout		15,626	85.5	+2.8
Registered electors		18,272		
Liberal hold		Swing	+2.2	

General election December 1910: South Ayrshire
Party	Candidate	Votes	%	±%
Liberal	William Beale	8,715	56.0	−0.5
Conservative	Thomas Walker McIntyre	6,835	44.0	+0.5
Majority		1,880	12.0	−1.0
Turnout		15,550	83.0	−2.5
Registered electors		18,733		
Liberal hold		Swing	-0.5	

General Election 1914–15:

Another General Election was required to take place before the end of 1915. The political parties had been making preparations for an election to take place and by July 1914, the following candidates had been selected;

- Liberal: William Robertson
- Unionist:
- Labour: James Brown

General election 1918: South Ayrshire
Party		Candidate	Votes	%	±%
	Labour	James Brown	6,358	37.3	New
C	Unionist	John Buchanan Pollok-McCall	5,495	32.2	−11.8
	Liberal	William Robertson	4,555	26.7	−29.3
	Ind. Unionist	Hugh Robert Wallace	627	3.6	New
Majority			863	5.1	N/A
Turnout			17,035		
	Labour gain from Liberal		Swing	N/A	
C indicates candidate endorsed by the coalition government.

=== Elections in the 1920s ===
General election 1922: South Ayrshire
Party	Candidate	Votes	%	±%
Labour	James Brown	11,511	55.63	
National Liberal	William Reid (Scottish politician)	9,180	44.37	
Majority		2,331	11.26	
Turnout		20,691		
Labour hold		Swing		

General election 1923: South Ayrshire
Party	Candidate	Votes	%	±%
Labour	James Brown	11,169	55.91	+0.28
Unionist	Charles Fergusson	8,807	44.09	−0.28
Majority		2,362	11.82	+0.56
Turnout		19,976		
Labour hold		Swing		

General election 1924: South Ayrshire
Party	Candidate	Votes	%	±%
Labour	James Brown	11,313	50.39	−5.52
Unionist	C.I.A. Dubs	11,136	49.61	+5.52
Majority		177	0.78	−11.04
Turnout		22,449		
Labour hold		Swing		

General election 1929: South Ayrshire
Party	Candidate	Votes	%	±%
Labour	James Brown	16,981	58.1	+7.7
Unionist	C.I.A. Dubs	12,240	41.9	−7.7
Majority		4,741	16.2	+15.4
Turnout		29,221		
Labour hold		Swing		

=== Elections in the 1930s ===
General election 1931: South Ayrshire
Party	Candidate	Votes	%	±%
Unionist	James MacAndrew	16,675	54.84	
Labour	James Brown	13,733	45.16	
Majority		2,942	9.68	N/A
Turnout		30,408	79.27	
Unionist gain from Labour		Swing		

General election 1935: South Ayrshire
Party	Candidate	Votes	%	±%
Labour	James Brown	18,190	57.61	
Unionist	James MacAndrew	13,386	42.39	
Majority		4,804	15.22	N/A
Turnout		31,576	78.03	
Labour gain from Unionist		Swing		

By-election 1939: South Ayrshire
Party	Candidate	Votes	%	±%
Labour	Alexander Sloan	17,908	57.97	+0.36
Unionist	Catherine Gavin	12,986	42.03	−0.36
Majority		4,922	15.94	+0.72
Turnout		30,894		
Labour hold		Swing		

=== Elections in the 1940s ===
General election 1945: South Ayrshire
Party	Candidate	Votes	%	±%
Labour	Alexander Sloan	21,235	61.34	
Unionist	Robert Mathew	13,382	38.66	
Majority		7,853	22.68	
Turnout		34,617	75.17	
Labour hold		Swing		

1946 South Ayrshire by-election
Party	Candidate	Votes	%	±%
Labour	Emrys Hughes	20,434	60.43	−0.91
Unionist	Robert Mathew	13,382	39.57	+0.91
Majority		7,052	20.86	−1.84
Turnout		33,816		
Labour hold		Swing		

=== Elections in the 1950s ===
General election 1950: South Ayrshire
Party	Candidate	Votes	%	±%
Labour	Emrys Hughes	22,284	60.23	−1.11
Unionist	JC George	14,717	39.77	+1.11
Majority		7,567	20.46	−2.22
Turnout		37,001	85.35	+10.18
Registered electors		43,350		
Labour hold		Swing	-1.1	

General election 1951: South Ayrshire
Party	Candidate	Votes	%	±%
Labour	Emrys Hughes	22,576	60.50	+0.27
Unionist	Derek MH Smith	14,740	39.50	−0.27
Majority		7,836	21.00	+0.54
Turnout		37,316	82.93	−2.42
Registered electors		44,999		
Labour hold		Swing	+0.27	

General election 1955: South Ayrshire
Party	Candidate	Votes	%	±%
Labour	Emrys Hughes	21,778	61.61	+1.11
Unionist	Derek MH Smith	13,569	38.39	−1.11
Majority		8,209	23.22	+2.22
Turnout		35,347	76.83	−6.10
Registered electors		46,007		
Labour hold		Swing	+1.11	

General election 1959: South Ayrshire
Party	Candidate	Votes	%	±%
Labour	Emrys Hughes	24,774	63.72	+2.11
Unionist	William Hill Hunter	14,105	36.28	−2.11
Majority		10,669	27.44	+4.22
Turnout		38,879	80.89	+4.06
Registered electors		48,063		
Labour hold		Swing	+2.11	

=== Elections in the 1960s ===
General election 1964: South Ayrshire
Party	Candidate	Votes	%	±%
Labour	Emrys Hughes	24,795	66.68	+2.96
Unionist	William Hill Hunter	12,403	33.32	−2.96
Majority		12,403	33.36	+5.92
Turnout		37,187	77.58	−3.31
Labour hold		Swing	+3.0	

General election 1966: South Ayrshire
Party	Candidate	Votes	%	±%
Labour	Emrys Hughes	23,495	67.25	+0.57
Conservative	Christopher Graves	11,442	32.75	−0.57
Majority		12,053	34.50	+1.14
Turnout		34,937	75.13	−2.45
Labour hold		Swing	+0.5	

=== Elections in the 1970s ===
1970 South Ayrshire by-election
Party	Candidate	Votes	%	±%
Labour	Jim Sillars	20,664	52.7	−14.6
Conservative	Christopher Graves	9,778	24.9	−7.8
SNP	Samuel H. Purdie	7,785	19.8	New
Majority		10,886	27.8	−6.7
Turnout		38,227		
Labour hold		Swing		

General election 1970: South Ayrshire
Party	Candidate	Votes	%	±%
Labour	Jim Sillars	23,910	61.8	−5.4
Conservative	Norman Simpson	11,675	30.2	−2.5
SNP	Samuel H. Purdie	3,102	8.0	N/A
Majority		12,235	31.6	−2.9
Turnout		38,687	76.7	+1.6
Labour hold		Swing		

General election February 1974: South Ayrshire
Party	Candidate	Votes	%	±%
Labour	Jim Sillars	23,093	57.2	−4.6
Conservative	Robert Colquhoun	10,643	26.4	−3.8
SNP	Roger Mullin	6,612	16.4	+8.4
Majority		12,450	30.8	−0.8
Turnout		40,438	79.5	+2.8
Labour hold		Swing	−0.4	

General election October 1974: South Ayrshire
Party	Candidate	Votes	%	±%
Labour	Jim Sillars	22,329	56.2	−1.0
SNP	Roger Mullin	7,851	19.8	+3.4
Conservative	J Armstrong	7,402	18.6	−7.8
Liberal	Richard Mabon	2,130	5.4	New
Majority		14,478	36.4	+5.6
Turnout		39,712	77.4	−2.1
Labour hold		Swing	−2.2	

General election 1979: South Ayrshire
Party	Candidate	Votes	%	±%
Labour Co-op	George Foulkes	14,271	35.2	−21.0
SLP	Jim Sillars	12,750	31.5	−24.7
Conservative	G. Young	10,287	25.4	+6.8
SNP	Colin Cameron	3,233	8.0	−11.8
Majority		1,521	3.7	−32.7
Turnout		40,541	79.9	+2.5
Labour Co-op hold		Swing	−26.2	

== See also ==
- List of former United Kingdom Parliament constituencies
