= 1946 South Ayrshire by-election =

UK Parliamentary by-election

The 1946 South Ayrshire by-election was held on 7 February 1946. The by-election was held due to the death of the incumbent Labour MP, Alexander Sloan. It was won by the Labour candidate Emrys Hughes, with a swing against his party of less than 1%.

South Ayrshire by-election, 1946
Party	Candidate	Votes	%	±%
Labour	Emrys Hughes	20,434	60.43	−0.91
Unionist	Robert Mathew	13,382	39.57	+0.91
Majority		7,052	20.86	−1.83
Turnout		33,816		
Labour hold		Swing		
