= 1970 South Ayrshire by-election =

UK parliamentary by-election

The 1970 South Ayrshire by-election of 19 March 1970 was held after the death of Labour member of parliament (MP) Emrys Hughes on 18 October 1969. The seat was retained by the Labour Party.

In what was a fairly common occurrence at the time, the Scottish Liberal Party did not run a candidate for the by-election. However, in this case, the move had been in part instigated by former party leader Jo Grimond, who had privately mooted the idea of an electoral pact with the Scottish National Party. The Scottish Liberal Party opposed Scottish independence; hence, they rejected Grimond's proposal, but they agreed to give the SNP a free run in this situation.

The SNP had not contested the seat in the past, but during the campaign predicted that the result would be a "photo-finish" between their candidate and the Labour candidate. Both the Conservatives and Labour made complaints to the police about the illegal posting of SNP posters during the campaign, while on polling day an incident involving an SNP and a Labour official led to the former making a police complaint.

Marion McCutcheon, who turned 18 the day before the election, was at the time the youngest person to have voted at a parliamentary election in Scotland.

== Result ==
South Ayrshire, by-election 1970
Party	Candidate	Votes	%	±%
Labour	Jim Sillars	20,664	52.68	−14.57
Conservative	Christopher Graves	9,778	24.93	−7.82
SNP	Sam Purdie	7,785	19.85	New
Majority		10,886	27.75	−6.75
Turnout		38,227		
Labour hold		Swing		

The day after the election, but before the votes were counted, The Glasgow Herald reported that the Labour Party candidate seemed "certain to win the seat". After the result was known, the same newspaper's political correspondent suggested that "so handsome a victory" for Labour meant Harold Wilson could keep considering the option of calling a general election in the summer.
