= James MacAndrew =

Northern Irish Unionist MP (1899–1979)

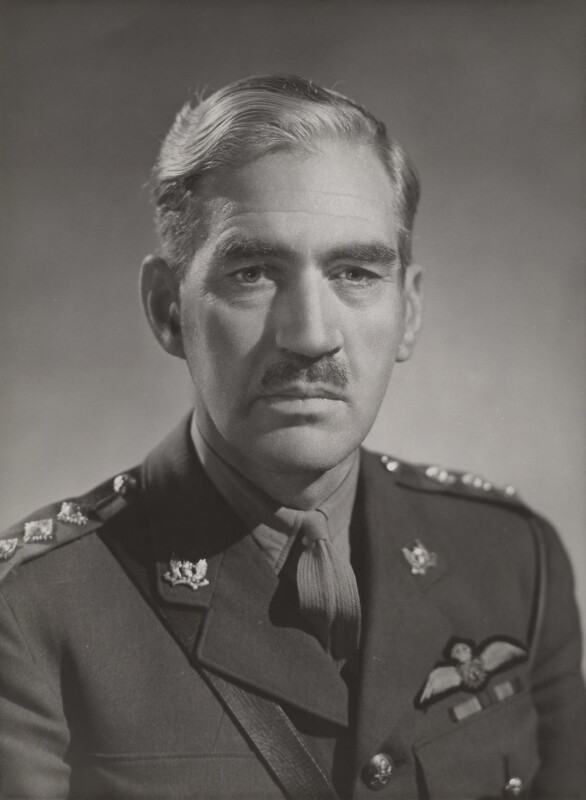
MacAndrew in 1944

James Orr MacAndrew (22 June 1899 – 1979) was Unionist MP for South Ayrshire for 1931–35. This was normally a safe Labour seat which MacAndrew did well to win in the National Government landslide in the 1931 general election, but he lost it in the limited Labour revival in 1935.

MacAndrew was born on 22 June 1899, the son of F G MacAndrew of Knock Castle, Largs. He married Eileen Butterfield in 1944: the marriage produced one recorded daughter.

His education included time at Glenalmond College and at Trinity Hall, Cambridge. He joined the British Royal Flying Corps (RFC) in 1917 and was severely wounded in France in 1918 (by which time the RFC had morphed into the RAF) which combined with the end of the war resulted in him being placed on the Unemployed List in 1919.

He was an army officer, reaching the rank of lieutenant-colonel. During the Second World War He was Honorary Colonel of the Ayrshire Yeomanry.

In addition to his political and military achievements he was Joint-Master of the Eglinton Foxhounds 1939–40.

== Sources ==
Parliament of the United Kingdom
Preceded by James Brown	Member of Parliament for South Ayrshire; 1931–1935	Succeeded by James Brown
